= Itsukaichi Kaidō =

Street in Tokyo, Japan

Itsukaichi Kaidō (五日市街道) is the historic and current main road between former Itsukaichi (now Akiruno) and Suginami in Tokyo's central suburbs. It generally follows the same road as the Suginami Akiruno Line along Tokyo Metropolitan Road Route 7 (ja).

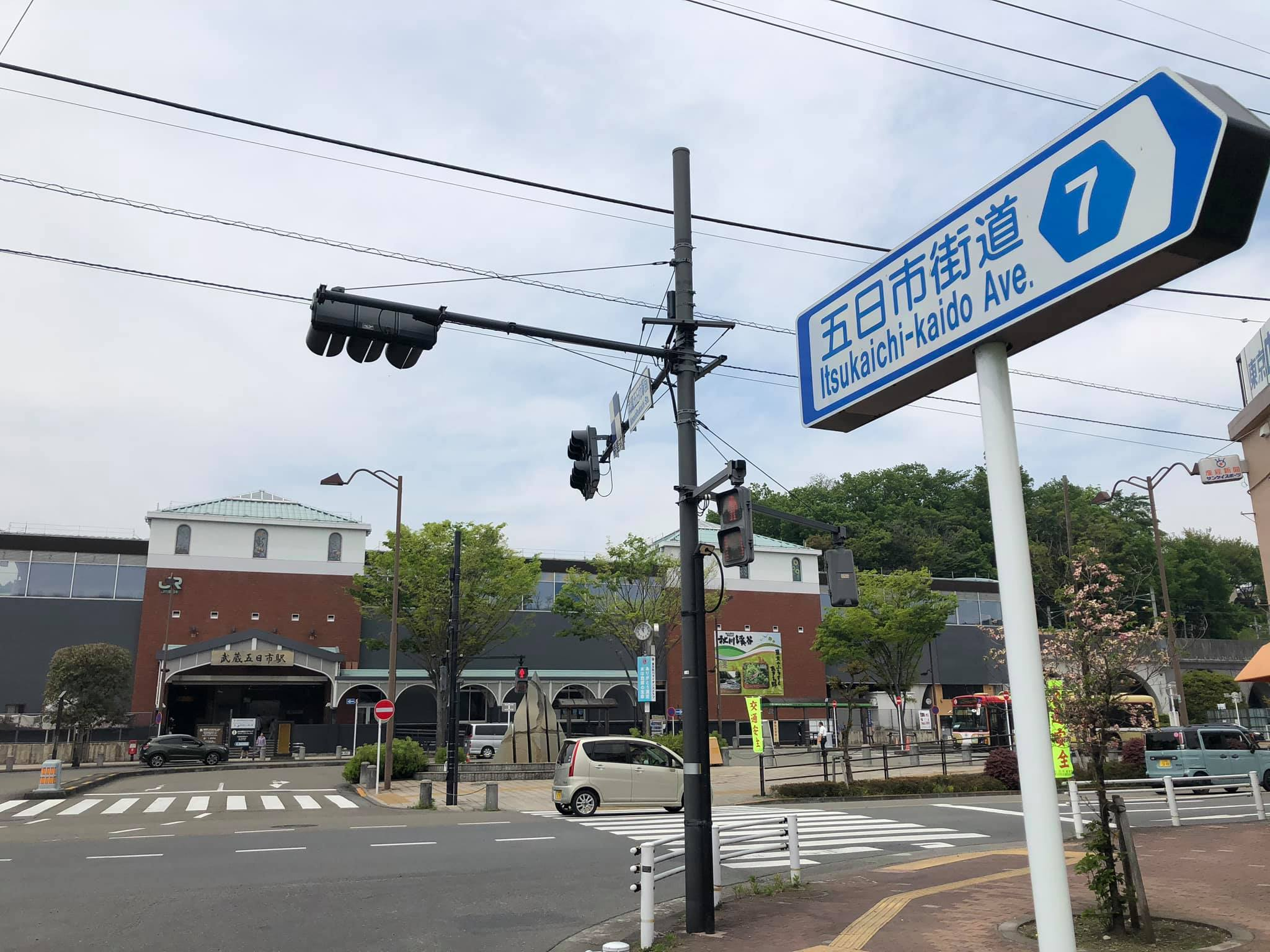
Itsukaichi Kaidō sign at western end point Musashi-Itsukaichi Station

== Overview ==
After Tokugawa Ieyasu entered Edo, he developed Itsukaichi Kaidō for the purpose of transporting timber and charcoal from Itukaichi (now Akiruno) and Hinohara. Initially, the road was called "Ina Road", after Ina, a settlement not far east of Itsukaichi. Ina was the source of stones used for restoring Edo Castle and the road developed for transport between these two places. After the restoration of Edo Castle was finished, charcoal became the main product transported and Itsukaichi grew to become more significant than Ina.

As land was opened up on the Musashino Plateau, the road between the Tama district and Edo developed as one highway.

== Main Locations ==
=== Suginami ===
- Shin-koenji Station
- Tokyo Metropolitan Toyotama High School
- Kanto Baus Itsukaichi Kaido Depot
- Zempukuji River Park
- Takaido Police Station
- Tokyo Metropolitan Nishi High School
- Nishi-Ogikubo Station

=== Musashino ===
- Kichijōji Station
- Fujimura Girls' Junior and Senior High School
- Seikei Gakuen School Corporation (Seikei University, Seikei Junior and Senior High School, Seikei Elementary School)
- Kanto Bus Musashino Depot

=== Nishitokyo ===
- Musashino University (Musashino Joshi Gakuin)

=== Koganei ===
- Hosei University Koganei Campus
- Koganei Park

=== Kodaira ===
- Bunka Gakuen University Kodaira Campus
- Kodaira Apartment Complex
- Japan Ground Self-Defense Force Camp Kodaira
- Hitotsubashi-Gakuen Station

=== Tachikawa ===
- Keyakidai Apartment Complex
- Sunagawa-Nanaban Station
- Showa Memorial Park
- Musashi-Sunagawa Station
- Seibu-Tachikawa Station
- Matsunaka Apartment Complex

=== Akishima ===
- Haijima Station

=== Fussa ===
- Yokota Air Base (United States Forces Japan Yokota Base)
- Ushihama Station

=== Akiruno ===
- Akirudai Park
- Akigawa Station
- Musashi-Itsukaichi Station
- Nishi Tokyo Bus Itsukaichi Depot

== See also ==
- Tokyo Metropolitan Road Route 7 (ja)
- Ōme Kaidō
- Edo Five Routes
