= Akigawa =

Akigawa may refer to:

- Agigawa Dam, Japan
- Aki River, a river in Japan, in Japanese, the Akigawa
- Akigawa Station, train station in Akigawa, Japan
- Akigawa, Tokyo, former municipality in Tokyo, Japan
- Holiday Rapid Okutama or Holiday Rapid Akigawa, a train service operating in Tokyo, Japan

== See also ==
- Masafumi Akikawa (born 1967), Japanese tenor
