= Holiday Rapid Okutama =

Japanese rapid train service

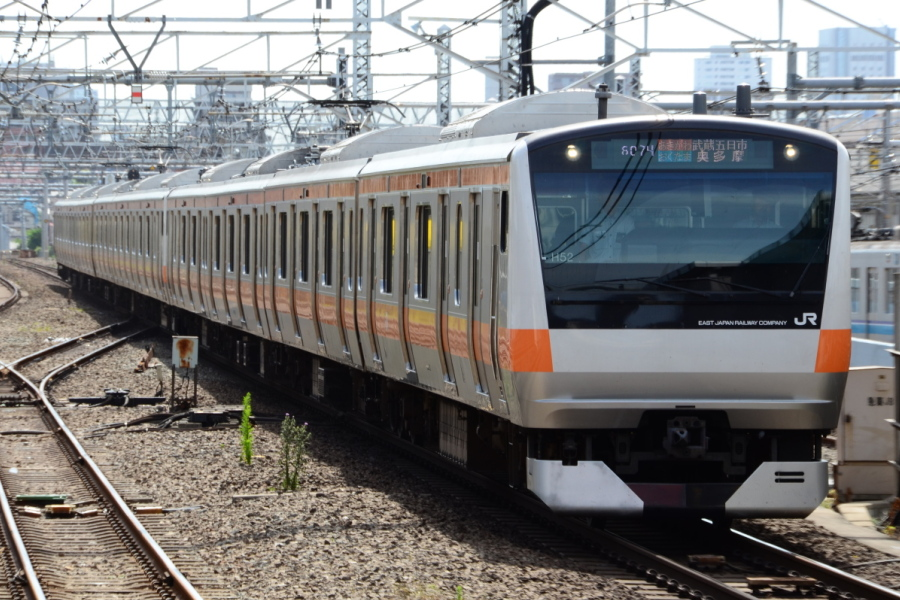
- E233-0 series EMU on a Holiday Rapid Okutama & Akigawa service, July 2011

Overview
- Service type: Special Rapid
- Status: In service
- Locale: Tokyo, Japan
- First service: July 1971
- Current operator(s): East Japan Railway Company (JR East)
- Former operator(s): Japanese National Railways

Route
- Termini: Shinjuku / Tokyo; Okutama / Musashi-Itsukaichi
- Service frequency: Three return workings, weekends and holidays only
- Line(s) used: Chūō Main Line, Ōme Line, Itsukaichi Line

On-board services
- Class(es): Standard class only
- Seating arrangements: Longitudinal
- Catering facilities: None
- Other facilities: No toilets

Technical
- Rolling stock: E233-0 series EMUs
- Track gauge: 1,067 mm (3 ft 6 in)
- Electrification: 1,500 V DC overhead
- Operating speed: 110 km/h (68 mph) max.

The Holiday Rapid Okutama (ホリデー快速おくたま) is a weekend/holiday rapid service train operated by East Japan Railway Company. It operates on the Chūō Line (Rapid) and the Ōme Line from Shinjuku to Oku-Tama in the morning, and from Oku-Tama to Tokyo in the evening.

This article also discusses the Holiday Rapid Akigawa (ホリデー快速あきがわ) services which, until 17 March 2023, was the counterpart to the Holiday Rapid Okutama services.

== Service pattern ==
In October 1990, service was included in a variety of Holiday Rapids, and started operation during the holidays as a temporary service, denoted the Holiday Rapid Okutama・Akigawa (ホリデー快速おくたま・あきがわ). From 1 December 2001 onwards, the service was upgraded to a regular service, operating on the weekends and holidays.

On weekends and holidays, three trains operate each day. From Shinjuku to Haijima, the Okutama and the Akigawa would be coupled and run together.

- Westbound trains depart Shinjuku, and decouple at Haijima. The Okutama continues on the Ōme Line to Oku-Tama.
- Eastbound trains depart Oku-Tama (Okutama), couple at Haijima, then head towards Tokyo.

== Stations served ==
Holiday Rapid Okutama

(Tokyo ← Kanda ← Ochanomizu ← Yotsuya ← ) Shinjuku - Nakano - Mitaka - Kokubunji - Tachikawa - Nishi-Tachikawa - Haijima - Fussa - Ōme - Mitake - Oku-Tama

- Stations listed in brackets are only served by eastbound services only.
- Additionally, the service would stop at extra stops where events are held.
  - Yokota Air Base Japanese-American Friendship Festival: Ushihama Station
  - Hamura Flower and Water Festival (Tulip Festival): Hamura Station
  - Ōme Marathon, Shiofune Kannonji Azalea Festival: Kabe Station
  - Yoshino Baigo Plum Festival: Hinatawada Station

== Timetable ==
The timetable will only list departure time (unless noted) at major stations, namely Tokyo, Shinjuku, Mitaka, Tachikawa, Haijima, and Ōme.

Station	↓ Westbound ↓			↑ Eastbound ↑		
Station	No. 1	No. 3	No. 5	No. 2	No. 4	No. 6
Tokyo	/			16:50	18:04	18:35
Shinjuku	06:45	07:44	08:37	16:36	17:51	18:22
Mitaka	06:59	07:58	08:52	16:22	17:37	18:07
Tachikawa	07:15	08:12	09:07	16:09	17:23	17:55
Haijima	07:30	08:28	09:19	15:58	17:12	17:44
Ōme	07:46	08:44	09:35	15:42	16:54	17:27

== Rolling stock ==
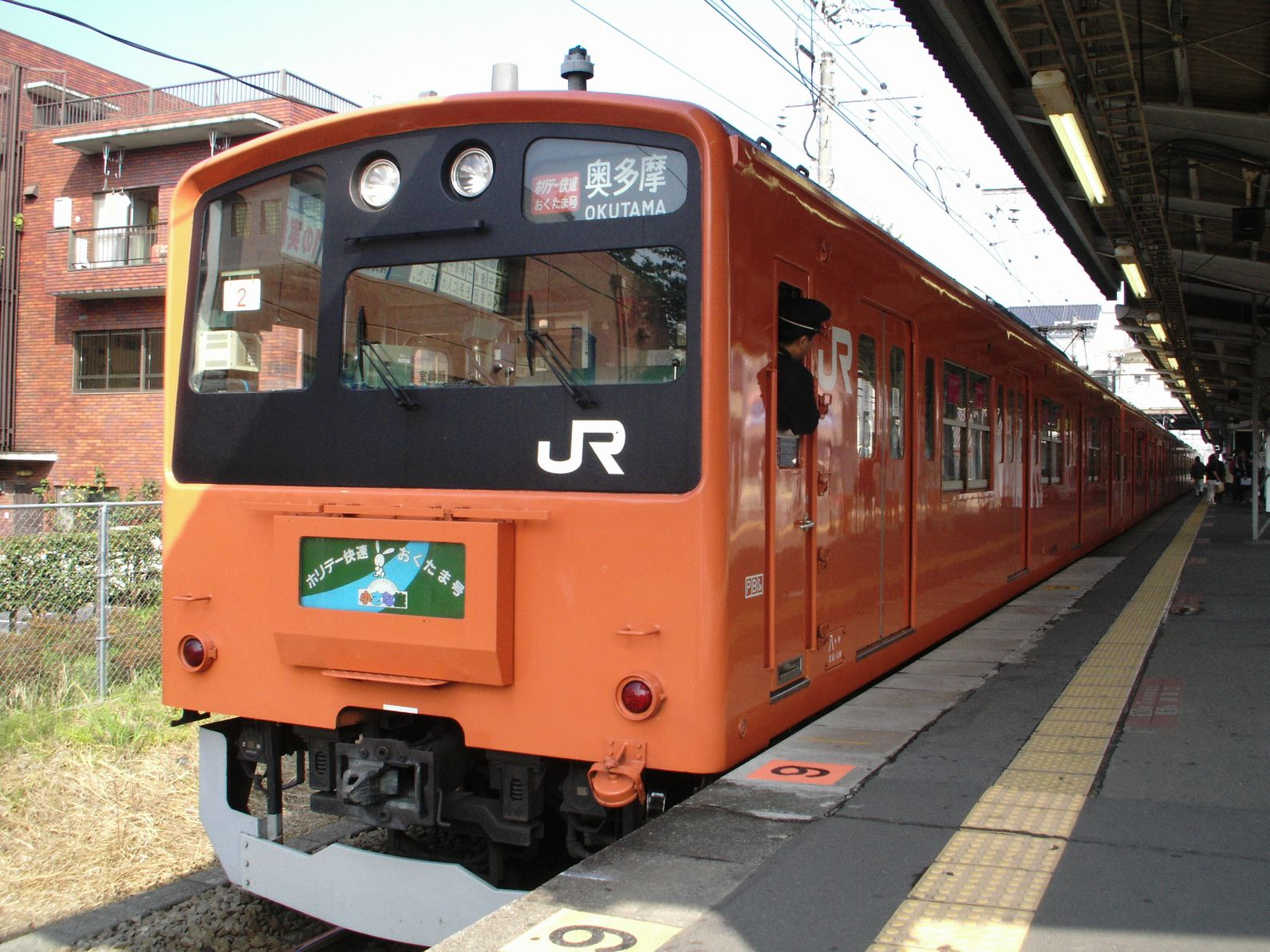
JR East 201 series EMU for the Holiday Rapid Okutama at Hamura Station

Current

- E233-0 series 6+4 car EMUs
  - Decoupling / coupling operations takes place at Haijima Station. East of Haijima, 10-car trains would be operated; West of Haijima, 6-car trains would operate for the Okutama, and 4-car trains would operate for the Akigawa.

Past

- 201 series 6+4 car EMUs

== History ==
The Holiday Rapid Akigawa (ホリデー快速あきがわ) was the counterpart to the Rapid Holiday Okutama that was abolished effective the 18 March 2023 timetable revision. It operated from Shinjuku to Musashi-Itsukaichi in the morning and back towards Tokyo in the evening, on the Chūō Line (Rapid), the Ōme Line, and the Itsukaichi Line. On the same timetable revision, JR East announced that effective on the same day, the direct service on Rapid Holiday Okutama services towards Shinjuku would be truncated at Okutama. The operations were as follows: Holiday Rapid Akigawa (Tokyo ← (Coupled with the Okutama) ← ) Shinjuku - (Coupled with the Okutama) - Haijima - Kumagawa - Higashi-Akiru - Akigawa - Musashi-Hikida - Musashi-Masuko - Musashi-Itsukaichi

- The service stops at all stations within the Itsukaichi Line (Haijima - Musashi-Itsukaichi).
- From Tokyo / Shinjuku - Haijima, the service is coupled with the Okutama, hence the stations served are the same.

=== Future development ===
With green cars undergoing testing on the Chūō Line and Ōme Line in 2020, preparations are underway for their eventual entry into service.
