= Kichijōji =

Neighborhood in Musashino, Tokyo, Japan

Coordinates: 35°42′11″N 139°34′47″E

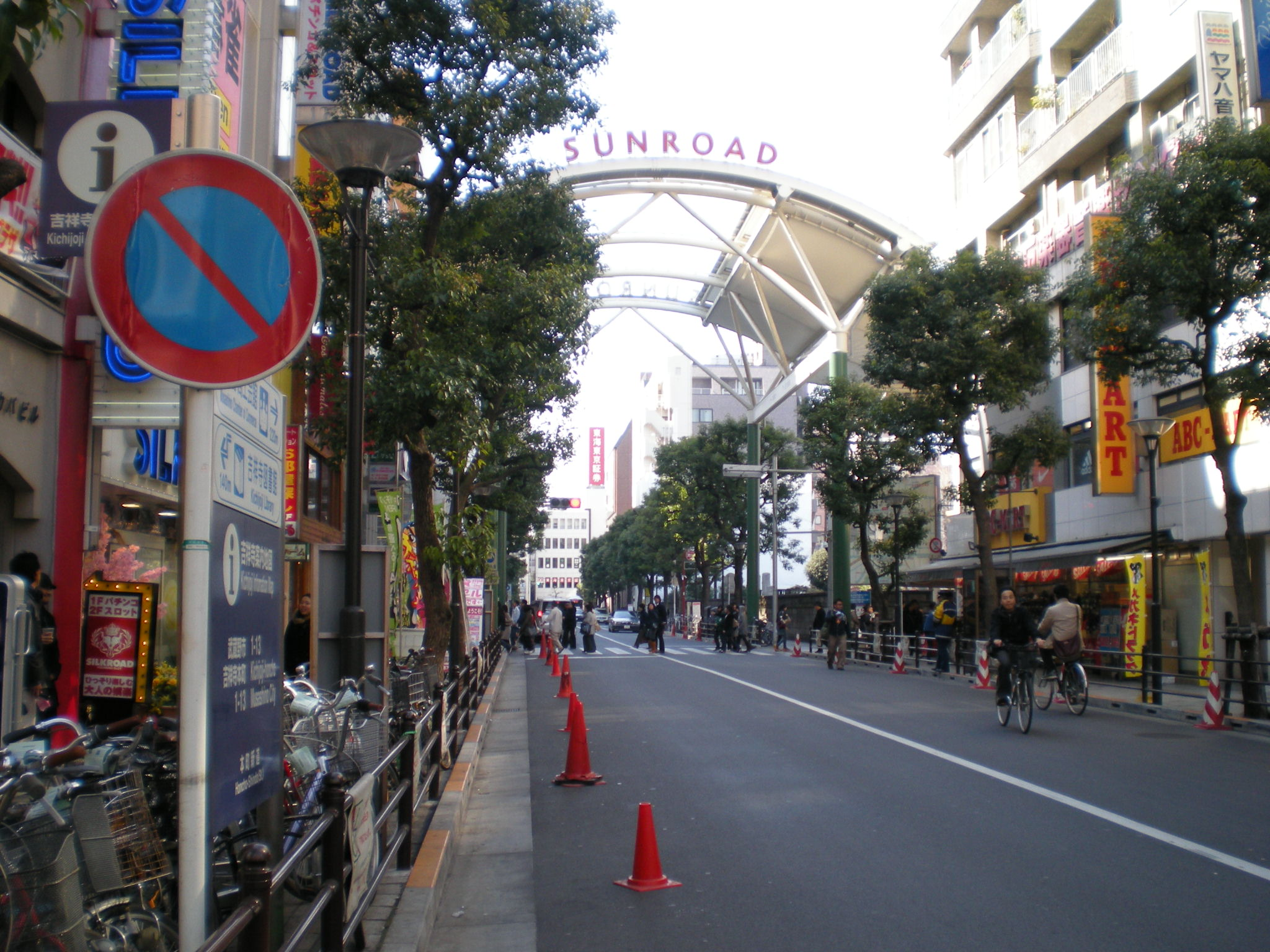
Sun Road

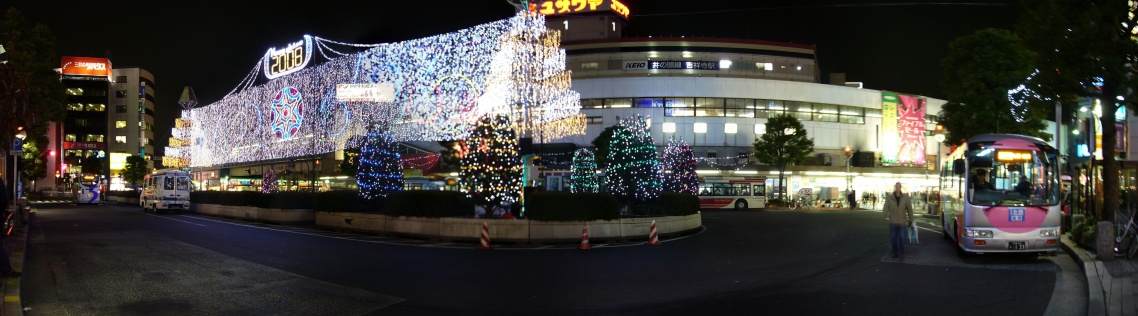
Kichijōji Station (in back). A pink Moo-bus, a Musashino city bus, waits for passengers.

Kichijōji (吉祥寺) is a neighborhood in the city of Musashino in Western Tokyo, Japan. It is centered on a compact commercial area to the north and south of Kichijōji Station, with a full range of shops, restaurants, bars, and coffee houses. The area is a popular center for shopping and leisure in the Tokyo metropolitan area due in part to its close proximity to Inokashira Park and Inokashira Park Zoo.

Kichijōji has been voted the number 1 place in Japan that Japanese would like to live every year since the 1990s according to polls by the magazine CNN GO. Kichijōji Station is served by the Chūō Line which runs to Tokyo Central Station in around 30 minutes, the Chūō–Sōbu Line, a Tozai Line through service and is also a terminus of the Keiō Inokashira Line, which takes passengers as far as Shibuya in around 20 minutes on the express service.

== History ==
This town was named after the Kichijō-ji Temple which was located in Bunkyō City, Tokyo, before being destroyed by fire in the year 1657. This temple, in turn, derived its name from the Hindu/Buddhist goddess Lakshmi, known as Kichijōten in Japan.

During the Great fire of Meireki, the town in front of Suwazan Kichijō-ji Temple gate, Edo's Hongo Motomachi (now: Hongō 1-chome, Bunkyō, near Suidōbashi Station) was destroyed by fire. Afterwards, based on town planning, the shogunate rebuilt the area for daimyō residences. Since the residents who used to live in front of Kichijō-ji gate had suffered great loss of residence and farm land, the shogunate's official reed lands named "Reno" and "Mureno" were provided as substitute land for them. Those hoping to apply were given a rice stipend and house construction loans with a 5-year limit. Kichijō-ji samurai, Sato Sadaemon and Miyazaki Jinemon, in cooperation with local farmer Matsui Jurozaemon, opened up the eastern district of present-day Musashino and relocated the residents there.

Soon after, with the opening of the Tamagawa Aqueduct, the previously poorly watered uninhabited Musashino Plateau was cultivated, turning it into a vast farmland. In the process, the neatly partitioned thin rectangular shaped plots of land along Itsukaichi Kaidō (ja) (currently Tokyo Metropolitan Route 7, Suginami Akiruno Line) were formed. Some migrants were granted lengths of land of more than 1000 meters long in the land area extending from Itsukaichi Kaidō to the Tamagawa Aqueduct, up to where the Senkawa Aqueduct (ja) divides. But the soil was not fertile, so all of the farmland became dry soil fields, with no wet rice fields. Because of the residents who still had attachment to the former Kichijō-ji, the new fields were named Kichijōji Village.

== Economy ==
The neighborhood is dominated by a shopping district centered on a covered street, Sun Road, which extends north from Kichijōji Station. This well organized and clean area includes amenities, shops, entertainment and restaurants.

Halfway up this shopping street is the Buddhist temple Gessō-ji (月窓寺), with graveyard, and at the northern end of it are Shinto shrines, the latter holding the occasional festival, with amusements such as fishing for gold fish, sweet food stalls, and typical dishes.

On the north, east, and south sides of the station is a large nightlife area with many restaurants, bars, izakaya, and "live" houses. On the north-east side of the station lies a red-light district on the Chūō Line between Tachikawa and Shinjuku, containing numerous cabarets, bars, and pink salons.

The anime and manga companies Coamix and Bee Train have their headquarters in Kichijōji. Studio Ghibli was previously located in Kichijōji.

== Inokashira Park ==
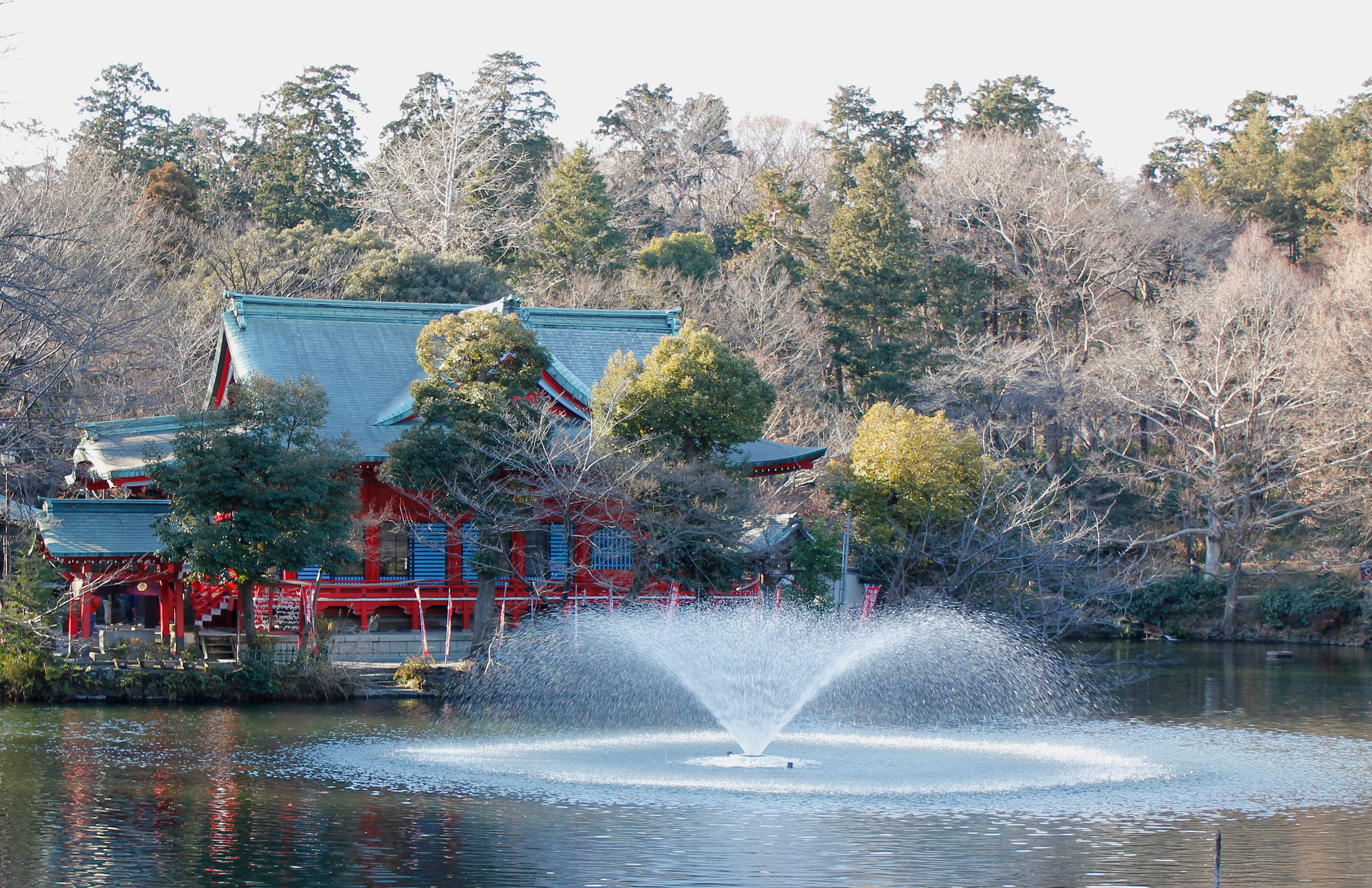
The Temple in Inokashira Park

Inokashira Park, the source of the Kanda River (神田川 Kanda-gawa), is located south of Kichijōji Station, and is a favorite spot for springtime hanami, or cherry-blossom viewing. Public-opinion surveys consistently designate Kichijōji one of Tokyo's most desirable residential neighborhoods. It features a large center lake, petting zoo, small cafes, food vendors, and street performers around the perimeter of the park. Nearby is the Ghibli Museum, which is part of the neighboring city Mitaka.

== Education ==
Seikei University (成蹊大学) is a private university in the northwestern area of the district. It is part of a wider educational institute—an escalator school—which teaches from elementary school right through to university level, and is situated amongst rows of large trees in that area of Kichijōji.

Tokyo Metropolitan Board of Education operates area high public schools.

Musashino City operates public elementary and junior high schools.

Little Angels International School, a private international school, previously had a campus in Kichijōji.

Axis International School is a private school accepting children from the age of 1 to the second year of university.

== Kichijōji in popular culture ==
Kichijōji is often portrayed in a variety of television shows, motion pictures, literature, and other media.

=== Video games ===
- Shin Megami Tensei: The protagonist lives in Kichijōji along with his mother and his dog.
- First Kiss Story: The town in which the game takes place is modeled after Kichijōji.
- Persona 5 Royal: the protagonist, known as Joker can hang out with Kasumi Yoshizawa, and Goro Akechi in Kichijōji.
- NG: Visual novel game for PS Vita and PS4 taking place in Kissōji, a fictional town based on Kichijōji.

=== Anime ===
- Tokyo Ghoul (season 1)
- Kujibiki Unbalance
- Ocean Waves: The first and last scene of the film take place at Kichijōji Station.
- Code-E
- Ultimate Girls (1st episode)
- Full Metal Panic? Fumoffu: "Uncontrollable Bluebird"
- Yawara! (14th episode)
- Maria-sama ga Miteru
- Aura Battler Dunbine: The main protagonist lives in Kichijōji.
- Genma Wars
- Kimagure Orange Road: Ano hi ni kaeritai
- Megazone 23
- To Love-Ru
- DD Fist of the North Star
- Tesagure! Bukatsu-mono
- Happy Jozy: A comedic family of Americans experience life in Japan taking place in Kichijōji.
- Occultic;Nine
- Brothers Conflict (Noticeable in episode 1)
- Shirobako

=== Manga ===
- Kichijōji Catwalk
- Tokyo Tribes (Santa Inoue)
- Fourteen (Kazuo Umezu)
- Nantoka Narudesho! (Hisashi Eguchi)
- Cher Gou Gou ... Mon Petit Chat, Mon Petit Ami (Yumiko Ōshima)
- I"s (Masakazu Katsura)
- Video Girl Ai (Masakazu Katsura)
- Ellie My Love (Mako Takami)
- Itazura na Kiss (Kaoru Tada)
- Kodoku no Gourmet
- Restore Garage 251 (Ryuji Tsugihara)
- Kichijōji Gang (Sachiko Nagahama)
- Café Kichijōji de
- Great Teacher Onizuka (Toru Fujisawa)
- Cat's Eye (2010)
- Chūō-sen Drops (Natsuo Motomachi)
- Rokudenashi Blues (Masanori Morita)
- Sgt. Frog (Mine Yoshizaki)
- Is Kichijōji the Only Place to Live? (Hirochi Maki)
- Hinako Note (Mitsuki)

=== Film ===
- Sebastian (Sōkichi Miyata)
- Amacchoroi Love Song (Sōkichi Miyata)
- The Mirage Flowers (Tadaaki Horai)
- Sayonara Kēki to Fushigina Ranpu (Jun'ichi Kanai)
- Kichijōji no Asahina-kun (Shōichi Katō)
- Rinjō (Hajime Hashimoto)
- Parks (Natsuki Seta)

== Gallery ==
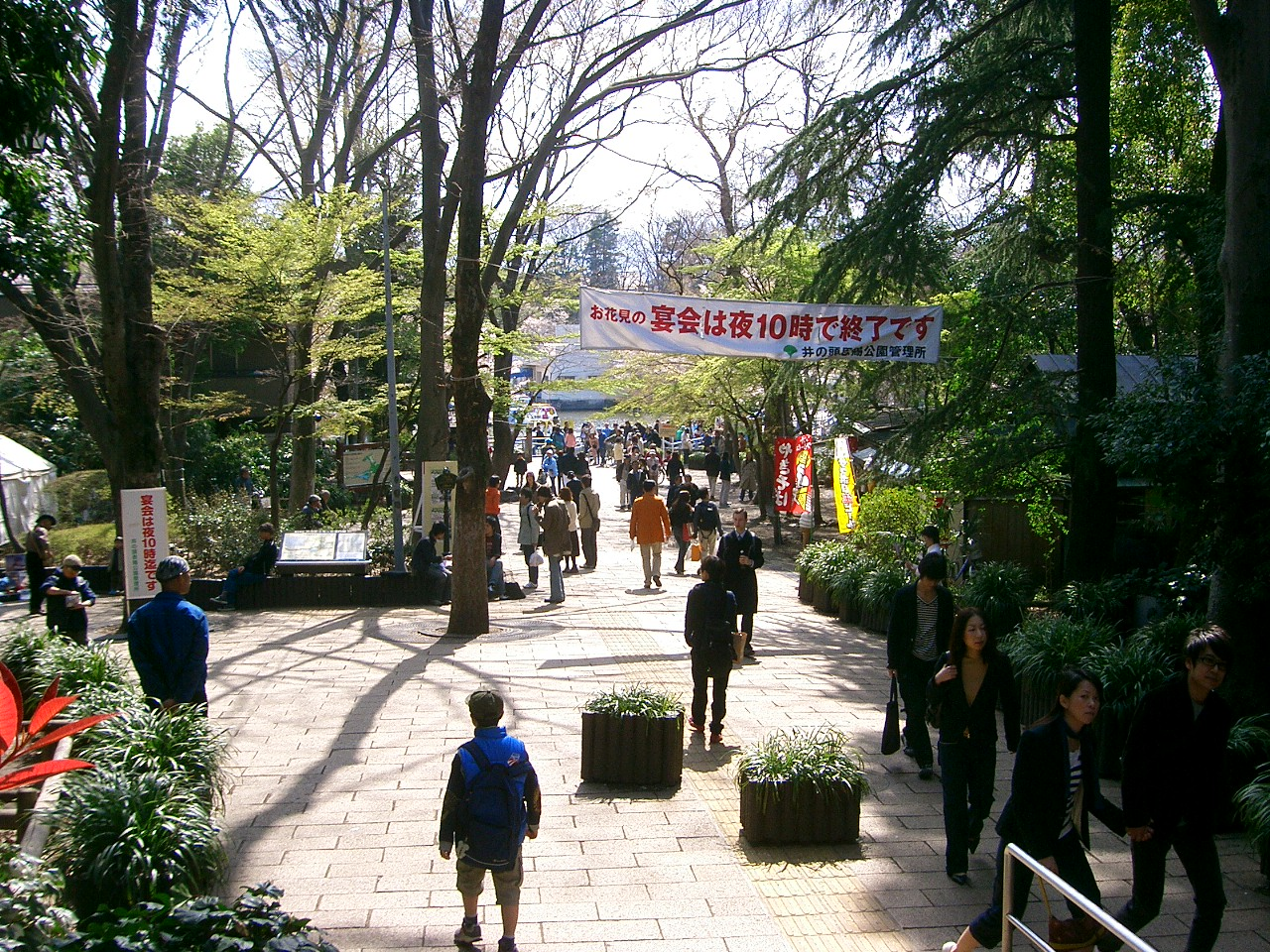
Entrance to Inokashira Park

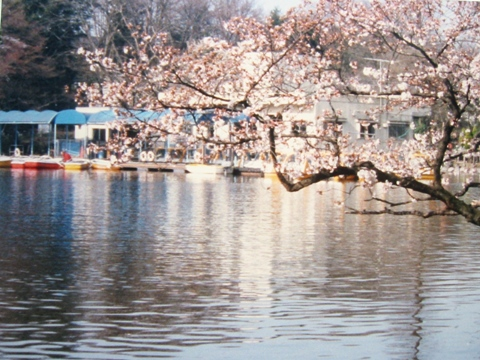
Cherry blossoms in Inokashira park

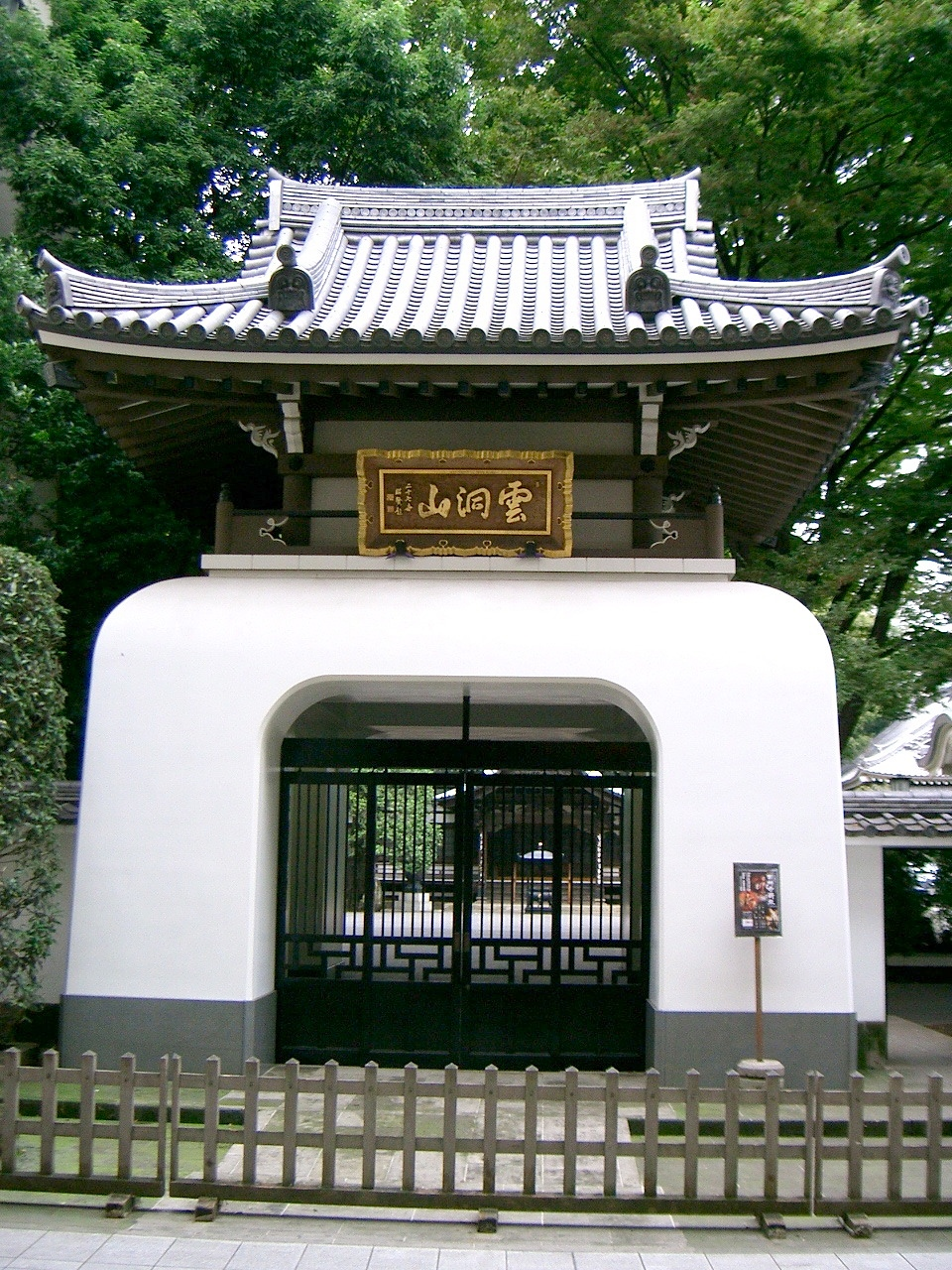
White Temple Gates in a busy shopping town at the opposite side of Kichijoji station to Inokashira Park

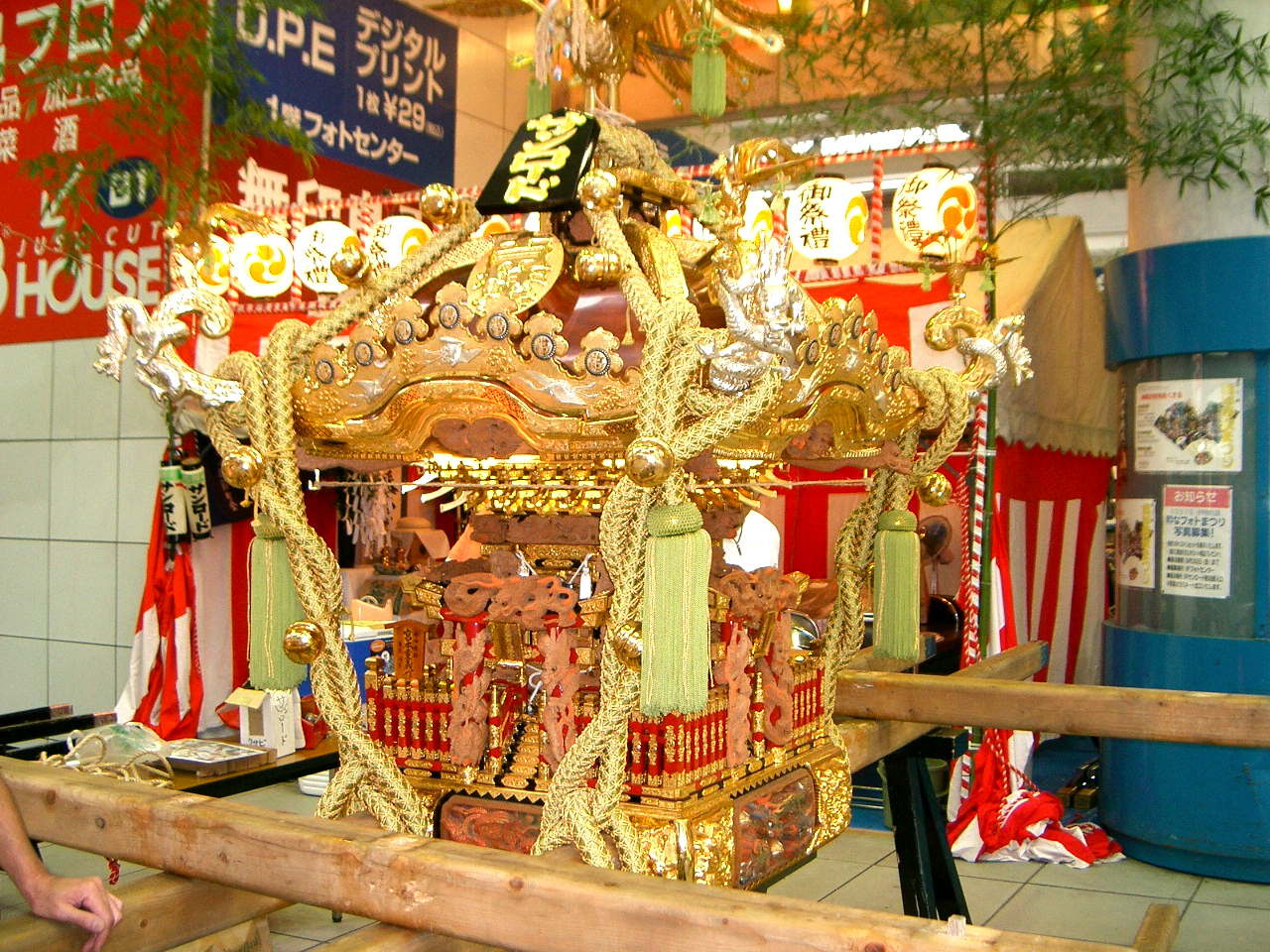
Kichijoji's gold and platinum plated Mikoshi

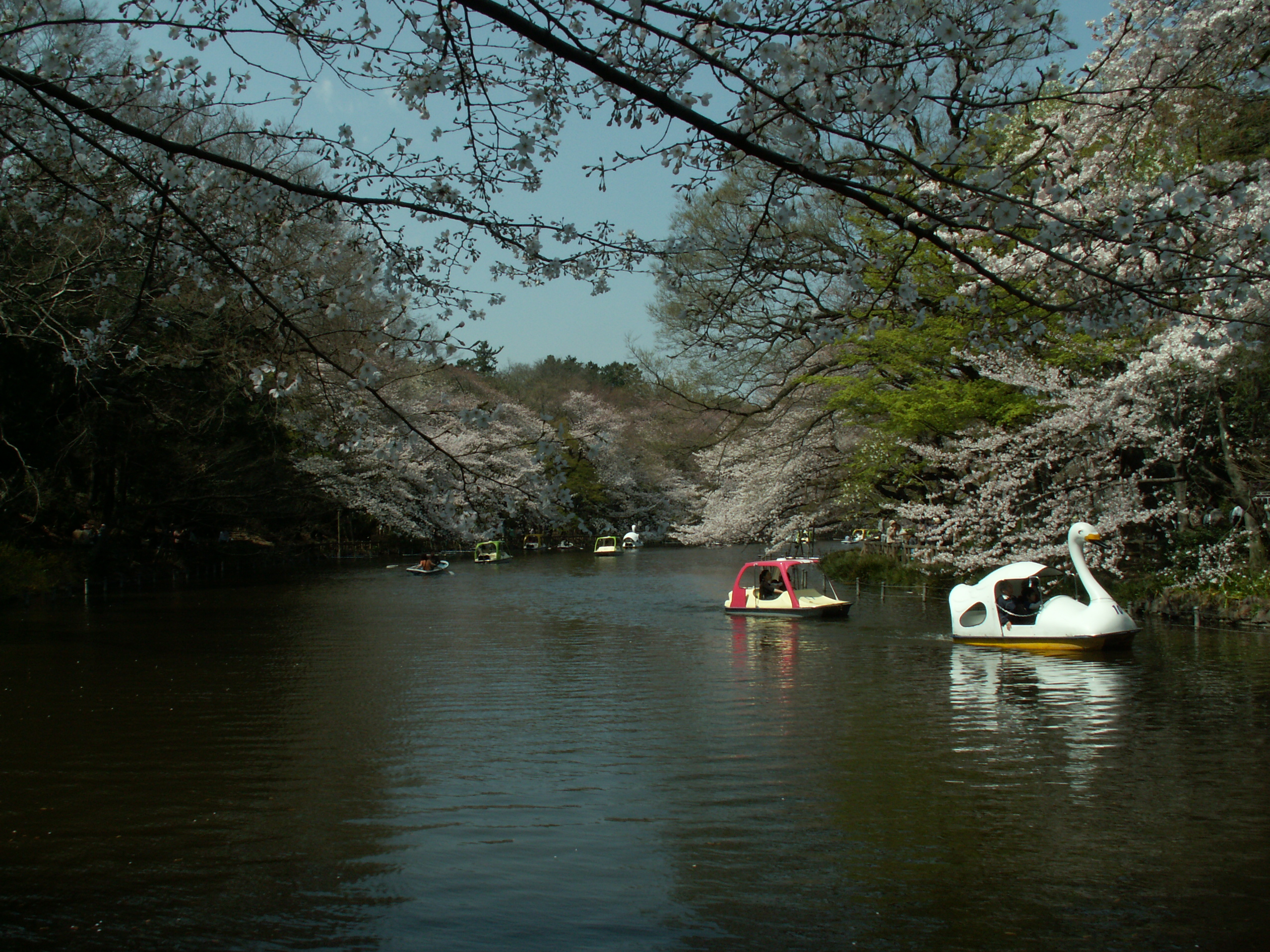
Cherry blossoms during Hanami

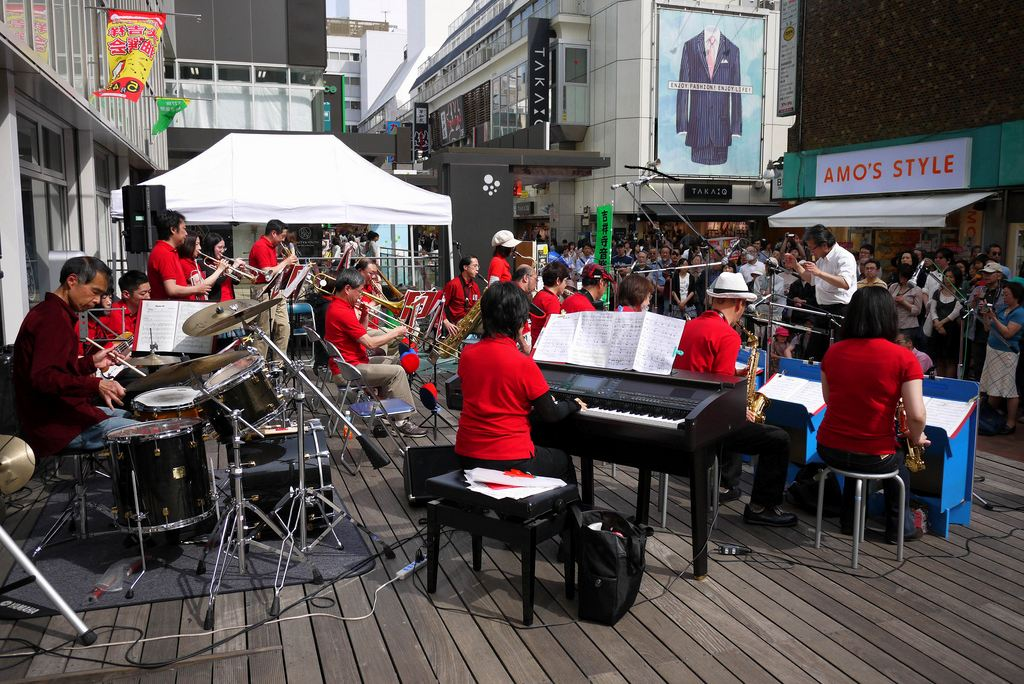
Big band giving a concert just outside a department store in the middle of the shopping district Kichijoji
