= Hinode, Tokyo =

Hinode 日の出町
- Town
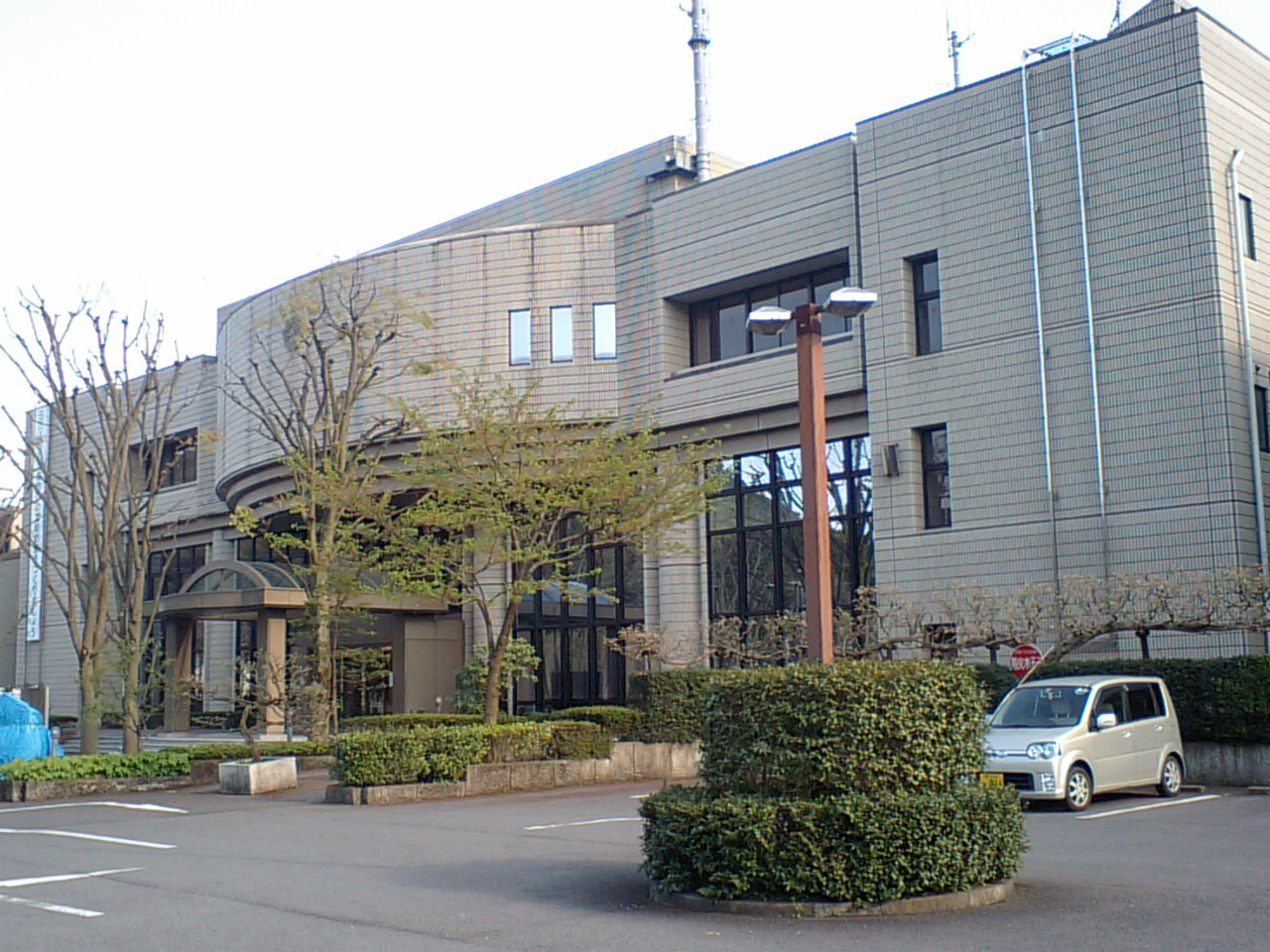
- Hinode Town Hall

- Flag Seal

- Location of Hinode in Tokyo

- Coordinates: 35°44′31.6″N 139°15′16.5″E
- Country: Japan
- Region: Kantō
- Prefecture: Tokyo
- District: Nishitama

Area
  - Total: 28.07 km^{2} (10.84 sq mi)

Population (April 2021)
  - Total: 16,563
  - Density: 590.1/km^{2} (1,528/sq mi)
- Time zone: UTC+9 (Japan Standard Time)
- Symbols
  - Tree: Abies firma
  - Flower: Wisteria floribunda, sakura
  - Bird: Japanese bush warbler
- Phone number: 042-597-0511
- Address: 2780 Hirai, Hinode-machi, Nishitama-gun, Tokyo 190-0192
- Website: Official website

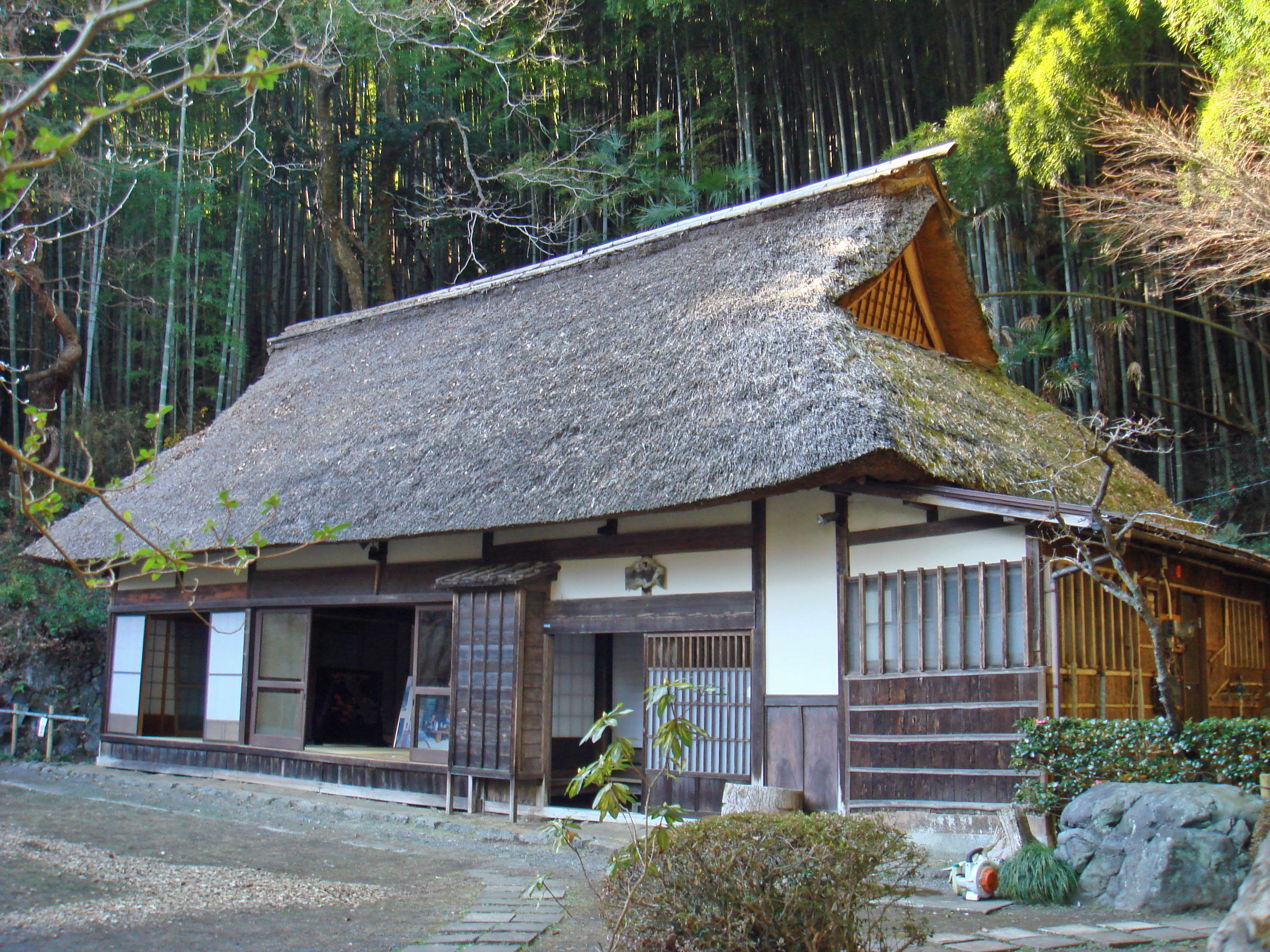
Hinode Seiundo, former Prime Minister Nakasone's retreat

Hinode (日の出町, Hinode-machi) is a town located in the western portion of Tokyo Prefecture, Japan. As of 1 April 2021, the town had an estimated population of 16,563, and a population density of 590 persons per km^{2}. The total area of the town is 28.07 square kilometres (10.84 sq mi).

== Geography ==
Hinode is located in the foothills of the Okutama Mountains of western Tokyo. The highest point is Mount Hinode at 902 m. The Hirai and Ōguno Rivers drain the town.

=== Surrounding municipalities ===
Tokyo Metropolis

- Akiruno
- Ōme

=== Climate ===
Hinode has a humid subtropical climate (Köppen Cfa) characterized by warm summers and cool winters with light to no snowfall. The average annual temperature in Hinode is 12.3 °C. The average annual rainfall is 2998 mm with September as the wettest month. The temperatures are highest on average in August, at around 23.5 °C, and lowest in January, at around 0.7 °C.

== Demographics ==
Per Japanese census data, the population of Hinode has remained relatively constant over the past 30 years.

Historical population
Year	Pop.	±%
1920	5,651	—
1930	6,659	+17.8%
1940	6,673	+0.2%
1950	8,436	+26.4%
1960	8,047	−4.6%
1970	8,835	+9.8%
1980	13,854	+56.8%
1990	16,444	+18.7%
2000	16,631	+1.1%
2010	16,650	+0.1%
2020	16,958	+1.8%

== History ==
The area of present-day Hinode was part of ancient Musashi Province. In the post-Meiji Restoration cadastral reform of July 22, 1878, the area became part of Nishitama District in Kanagawa Prefecture. The villages of Hirai and Ōguno were created on April 1, 1889, with the establishment of the modern municipalities system. Nishitama District was transferred to the administrative control of Tokyo Metropolis on April 1, 1893. The village of Hinode was formed in 1955 by the merger of Hirai and Ōguno. Hinode was elevated to town status on June 1, 1974.

Former Prime Minister Yasuhiro Nakasone had a cottage, Hinode Sansō in Hinode. In 1983, while he was in office, Nakasone invited US president Ronald Reagan there, and held US-Japan summit in an informal atmosphere to establish friendly personal relations. After his resignation as prime minister, Nakasone also former South Korean president, Chun Doo-hwan, former Soviet general secretary Mikhail Gorbachev and many other foreign VIPs, including several US ambassadors at the cottage. Nakasone donated the cottage to the town of Hinode in 2006, and it is now maintained as a public park.

== Government ==
Hinode has a mayor-council form of government with a directly elected mayor and a unicameral town council of 14 members. Hinode, collectively with the municipalities of Akiruno, Fussa, Hamura, Mizuho, Hinohara and Okutama, contributes two members to the Tokyo Metropolitan Assembly. In terms of national politics, the town is part of Tokyo 25th district of the lower house of the Diet of Japan.

== Economy ==
Forestry and timber production are important industries. Cryptomeria and hinoki are economically important. Hinode produces 200,000 coffins annually, ranking first in Japan.

== Education ==
Hinode has three public elementary schools (Hirai, Honjuku, and Ōguno) and two public junior high schools (Hirai and Ōguno), operated by the town government.

- Hirai Elementary School (平井小学校)
- Hirai Junior High School (平井中学校)
- Honjuku Elementary School (本宿小学校)
- Oguno Elementary School (大久野小学校)
- Oguno Junior High School (大久野中学校)

Tokyo Metropolitan Board of Education operates high schools in nearby communities. The town itself does not have a high school.

Asia University has a subsidiary campus located in the town.

== Transportation ==
=== Railway ===
- Hinode is directly not served by any passenger railway lines but is very close (500m) to the Itsukaichi Line in Akiruno, Tokyo.

JR East – Itsukaichi Line

- Musashi-Hikida – Musashi-Masuko

=== Highways ===
- Ken-Ō Expressway - Hinode Interchange
