= Hinohara =

Hinohara 檜原村
- Village
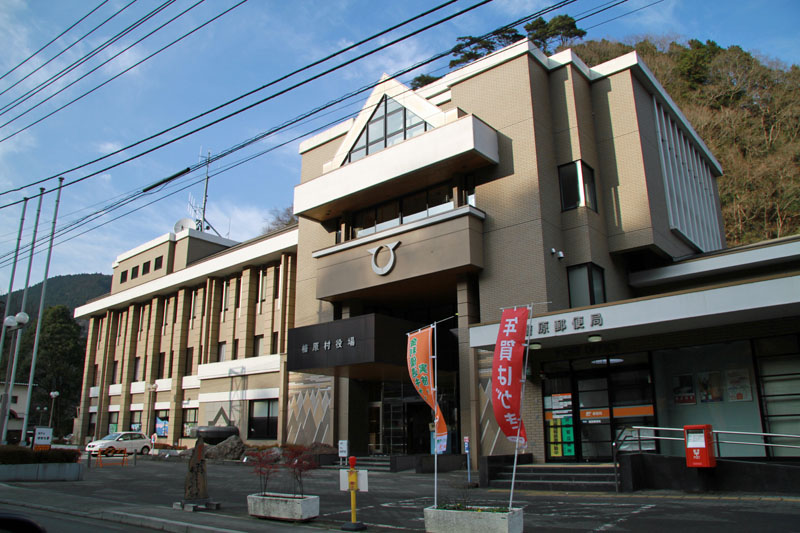
- Hinohara Village Hall

- Flag Seal

- Location of Hinohara in Tokyo

- Hinohara (Tokyo)
- Coordinates: 35°43′36.5″N 139°8′56″E
- Country: Japan
- Region: Kantō
- Prefecture: Tokyo
- District: Nishitama

Area
  - Total: 105.41 km^{2} (40.70 sq mi)

Population (April 2021)
  - Total: 2,101
  - Density: 19.93/km^{2} (51.62/sq mi)
- Time zone: UTC+9 (Japan Standard Time)
- Symbols
  - Tree: Hinoki
  - Flower: Kerria japonica
  - Bird: Japanese bush-warbler
- Phone number: 042-598-1011
- Address: 467-1 Hirohara-mura, Nishitama-gun, Tokyo 190-0212
- Website: Official website

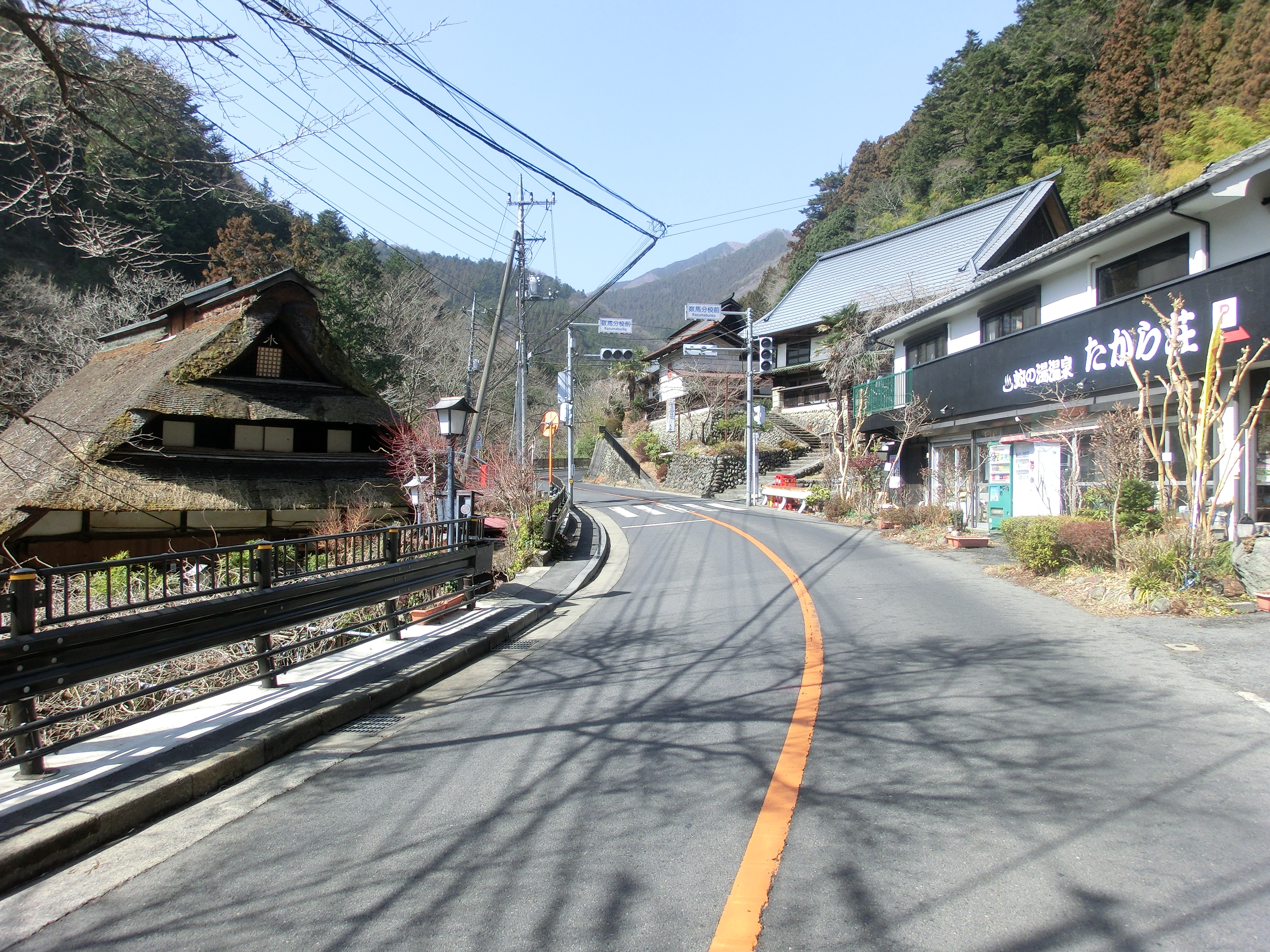
Scene in Hinohara Village

Hinohara (檜原村, Hinohara-mura) is a village located in West Tokyo, the western portion of Tokyo Prefecture, Japan. As of 1 April 2021, the village had an estimated population of 2,101, and a population density of 20 persons per km^{2}. The total area of the village is 105.41 square kilometres (40.70 sq mi).

It is the only administrative unit left in the non-insular area of Tokyo that is still classified as a village.

== Geography ==
Hinohara lies in the mountainous upper reaches of the Akigawa, a tributary of the Tama River. The highest point is the summit of Mount Mitō at 1528 m. 93% of its area is forest. Motoshuku, at the confluence of the north and south branches of the Akigawa, is the center of the village and is where the village offices are located. Mountains in Hinohara include Shōtō (990 m), Ichimichi (795 m), Kariyose (687 m), Usuki (842), and Ōdake (1267 m).

The name Hinohara means the field or forest of Chamaecyparis obtusa. Formerly the trees were cut down to provide timber to build wooden structures in Edo.

=== Surrounding municipalities ===
Kanagawa Prefecture

- Sagamihara (to the west)

Tokyo Metropolis

- Akiruno (to the east)
- Hachiōji (to the east)
- Okutama (to the north)

Yamanashi Prefecture

- Uenohara

=== Climate ===
Hinohara has a humid subtropical climate (Köppen Cfa) characterized by warm summers and cool winters with light to no snowfall. The average annual temperature in Hinohara is 11.8 °C. The average annual rainfall is 2091 mm with September as the wettest month. The temperatures are highest on average in August, at around 23.2 °C, and lowest in January, at around 0.3 °C.

== Demographics ==
Per Japanese census data, the population of Hinohara has been decreasing since the 1950s, and is now less than half of what it was a century ago.

Historical population
Year	Pop.	±%
1920	5,389	—
1930	5,513	+2.3%
1940	5,693	+3.3%
1950	6,373	+11.9%
1960	5,650	−11.3%
1970	5,036	−10.9%
1980	4,230	−16.0%
1990	3,808	−10.0%
2000	3,256	−14.5%
2010	2,558	−21.4%
2020	2,003	−21.7%

== History ==
The area of present-day Hinohara was part of ancient Musashi Province. In the post-Meiji Restoration cadastral reform of July 22, 1878, the area became part of Nishitama District in Kanagawa Prefecture. The village of Hinohara was created on April 1, 1889, with the establishment of the modern municipalities system. Nishitama District was transferred to the administrative control of Tokyo Metropolis on April 1, 1893.

== Government ==
Hinohara has a mayor-council form of government with a directly elected mayor and a unicameral village council of nine members. The village has 57 employees. Hinohara, collectively with the municipalities of Akiruno, Fussa, Hamura, Hinode, Mizuho and Okutama, contributes two members to the Tokyo Metropolitan Assembly. In terms of national politics, the village is part of Tokyo 25th district of the lower house of the Diet of Japan.

== Economy ==
The principal industries of Hinohara are forestry and timber production. These days it is not as active as it used to be, but some young people are trying to run a new forestry company. Recently, the quarrying industry has been used to mine stones from mountains. Also, many construction companies also receive public works orders.

In sunny areas on the mountain slopes, potatoes and konjaku are grown. Wasabi, mushrooms and cyclamen are also grown there.

In addition, Hinohara has many guest houses, inns, campsites, fishing grounds, hot springs, souvenir shops, and restaurants. These are service industries for tourists who come in search of abundant nature.

An ecotourism bus tour operation from the company Hato Bus that originates in Tokyo Station and travels to Hinohara began in 2024.

== Education ==
The village has one public elementary school, Hinohara Elementary School (檜原小学校), and one public junior high school, Hinohara Junior High School (檜原中学校).

== Transportation ==
=== Railway ===
Hinohara has no passenger railway service. The main form of public transportation is bus. Scheduled bus service is available from Musashi-Itsukaichi Station on the JR East Itsukaichi Line.

=== Highway ===
Hinohara has no national expressways or national highways. Tokyo Routes 33, 205, and 206 carry vehicular traffic.
