= Western Tokyo =

- Western Tokyo (green) within Tokyo Prefecture
- Country: Japan
- Island: Honshū
- Region: Kantō
- Prefecture: Tokyo

Area
  - Total: 1,160 km^{2} (450 sq mi)

Population (October 1, 2018)
  - Total: 4,233,493
  - Density: 3,650/km^{2} (9,450/sq mi)

Western Tokyo (東京都西部, Tōkyō-to seibu), known as the Tama area (多摩地域, Tama chiiki), Tama region (多摩地方, Tama-chihō) or toka (都下) locally, in the Tokyo Metropolis consists of 30 ordinary municipalities (cities (市 shi), towns (町 machi) and one village (村 mura)), unlike the eastern part which consists of 23 special wards.

Before it was transferred to Tokyo in 1893, the Tama area, then also still often referred to as the "three Tama" (三多摩, san-Tama) (referring to the West, North and South Tama counties it consisted of) had formed the Northern part of Kanagawa Prefecture.

== Overview ==
Whereas in the east of Tokyo Metropolis the 23 special wards occupy the area that was formerly Tokyo City, the west consists of 30 other ordinary municipalities: cities (Nos. 1–26), towns (Nos. 27, 28, 30) and a village (No. 29).

=== List of cities, towns and village ===

No.	Flag	Name	Japanese (kanji)	Hiragana	Population (as of October 2016)	Density (/km²)	Area (km²)
1		Hachiōji	八王子市	はちおうじし	577,254	3,097	186.38
2		Tachikawa	立川市	たちかわし	180,214	7,398	24.36
3		Musashino	武蔵野市	むさしのし	147,607	13,443	10.98
4		Mitaka	三鷹市	みたかし	191,408	11,657	16.42
5		Ōme	青梅市	おうめし	134,857	1,305	103.31
6		Fuchū	府中市	ふちゅうし	263,835	8,965	29.43
7		Akishima	昭島市	あきしまし	111,942	6,456	17.34
8		Chōfu	調布市	ちょうふし	237,637	11,012	21.58
9		Machida	町田市	まちだし	433,938	6,065	71.80
10		Koganei	小金井市	こがねいし	124,712	11,036	11.30
11		Kodaira	小平市	こだいらし	194,757	9,496	20.51
12		Hino	日野市	ひのし	188,990	6,860	27.55
13		Higashimurayama	東村山市	ひがしむらやまし	150,101	8,757	17.14
14		Kokubunji	国分寺市	こくぶんじし	126,317	11,022	11.46
15		Kunitachi	国立市	くにたちし	75,022	9,205	8.15
16		Fussa	福生市	ふっさし	58,184	5,727	10.16
17		Komae	狛江市	こまえし	83,003	12,990	6.39
18		Higashiyamato	東大和市	ひがしやまとし	84,480	6,295	13.42
19		Kiyose	清瀬市	きよせし	75,400	7,370	10.23
20		Higashikurume	東久留米市	ひがしくるめし	116,309	9,030	12.88
21		Musashimurayama	武蔵村山市	むさしむらやまし	71,804	4,687	15.32
22		Tama	多摩市	たまし	147,822	7,036	21.01
23		Inagi	稲城市	いなぎし	90,774	5,051	17.97
24		Hamura	羽村市	はむらし	55,004	5,556	9.90
25		Akiruno	あきる野市	あきるのし	80,242	1,092	73.47
26		Nishitōkyō	西東京市	にしとうきょうし	203,258	12,905	15.75
27		Mizuho	瑞穂町	みずほまち	32,867	1,951	16.85
28		Hinode	日の出町	ひのでまち	17,226	614	28.07
29		Hinohara	檜原村	ひのはらむら	2,073	19.7	105.41
30		Okutama	奥多摩町	おくたままち	5,023	22.3	225.53
Overall:					4,233,493	3,650	1,160

The towns of Hinode, Mizuho, and Okutama, and the village of Hinohara make up the non-contiguous Nishitama District.

The offshore islands of Tokyo (including the Bonin, Volcano, Izu island chains, and the uninhabited islands of Okinotorishima and Minamitorishima) are not considered part of Western Tokyo.

== History ==
Under the Ritsuryō system, Western Tokyo was part of Musashi Province. The provincial capital was at Fuchū. The provincial temple (kokubunji) was at Kokubunji and the principal shrine (ichinomiya) was at Tama.

Western Tokyo previously consisted of three districts:

- Nishi-Tama District (西多摩郡, Nishi-Tama-gun) (lit. "Western Tama") encompassed the present-day cities of Akiruno, Fussa, Hamura, and Ōme; in addition to the four municipalities (3 towns and a village) that still remain a part of the district.
- Minami-Tama District (南多摩郡, Minami-Tama-gun) (lit. "Southern Tama") covered the area now occupied by Hachiōji, Hino, Inagi, Tama, and Machida. With the formation of Inagi (the last city to be created in Tokyo in 1971), Minamitama District ceased to exist.
- Kita-Tama District (北多摩郡, Kita-Tama-gun) (lit. "Northern Tama") consisted of the locations of the present-day cities of Akishima, Chōfu, Fuchū, Higashikurume, Higashimurayama, Higashiyamato, Kiyose, Kodaira, Koganei, Kokubunji, Komae, Kunitachi, Mitaka, Musashimurayama, Musashino, Nishitokyo, and Tachikawa, as well as some land now in Setagaya. With the establishment of the city of Musashimurayama in 1970, Kitatama District ceased to exist.
