= Nishitama District =

Nishitama 西多摩郡
- District
- Nishitama District
- Located in the green highlights

- Location in Japan
- Coordinates: 35°45′N 139°20′E
- Country: Japan
- Region: Kantō
- Prefecture: Tokyo Metropolis

Area
  - Total: 375.96 km^{2} (145.16 sq mi)

Population (August 1, 2011)
  - Total: 58,429
  - Density: 155/km^{2} (400/sq mi)
- Time zone: UTC+09:00 (JST)
- Website: www.nishitama-kouiki.jp

Nishitama (西多摩郡, Nishitama-gun; West Tama) is a district located in Tokyo Metropolis, Japan. It comprises the village of Hinohara and the following three towns:

- Hinode
- Mizuho
- Okutama

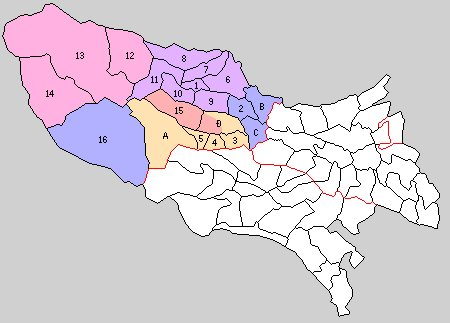
Former boundaries of Nishitama District

Historically, the cities of Ōme, Fussa, Hamura, and Akiruno were parts of Nishitama District but these were broken off from the district after they were elevated to city status.

== Education ==
Each of the towns and villages operates separate public elementary and junior high school systems.

Tokyo Metropolitan Government Board of Education operates Mizuho Nougei High School in Mizuho.

The school district also operates the following high schools in nearby Ōme:

- Norin High School
- Ome Sogo High School
- Tama High School

The district operates the following high schools in Fussa:

- Fussa High School
- Tama Technical High School

The district operates Hamura High School in Hamura.

The district operates the following schools in Akiruno:

- Akirudai High School
- Itsukaichi High School

== District timeline ==
- July 22, 1878: Tama District, which it had long been part of former Musashi Province, was divided into four parts: Higashitama (Eastern Tama), Kitatama (Northern Tama), Minamitama (Southern Tama) and Nishitama (Western Tama). Nishitama District had 1 town and 93 village areas.
- April 1, 1889: The new legislation, Nishitama District had 2 towns and 30 villages areas.
- April 1, 1893: Nishitama District was transferred from Kanagawa Prefecture to Tokyo Prefecture.
- June 1, 1955: The villages of Ohisano and Hirai were merged to create the new village of Hinode.
- October 1, 1956: The village of Nishitama was elevated to town status and renamed to Hamura.
- October 15, 1958: Parts of the village of Motosayama (from Iruma District, Saitama Prefecture), excluding the parts that was merged into the town of Musashi (from Iruma District) on October 14, 1958, was merged into the town of Mizuho.
- July 1, 1970: The town of Fussa was elevated to city status.
- May 5, 1972: The town of Akita was elevated to city status and renamed to Akigawa.
- June 1, 1974: The village of Hinode was elevated to town status.
- November 1, 1991: The town of Hamura was elevated to city status.
- September 1, 1995: The town of Itsukaichi was merged with the city of Akigawa to create the city of Akiruno.
