= Akigawa, Tokyo =

Akigawa 秋川市
- Former municipality
- Flag Emblem

- Location in Japan
- Coordinates: 35°43′44″N 139°17′39″E
- Country: Japan
- Region: Kantō region
- Prefecture: Tokyo Metropolis
- District: Nishitama District,
- Merged: September 1, 1995 (now part of Akiruno, Tokyo)

Area
  - Total: 22.44 km^{2} (8.66 sq mi)

Population (September 1, 1995)
  - Total: 56,654
  - Density: 2,435/km^{2} (6,310/sq mi)
- Time zone: UTC+09:00 (JST)

Akigawa (秋川市, Akigawa-shi; Japanese pronunciation: [ä̀.k̟ʲí.ɡä́.β̞ä́, -ŋä́-]) was a city located in the western portion of Tokyo Metropolis, Japan.

On April 1, 1889, the villages of Higashiakiru, Nishiakiru, Kusabana, Sugao, Sedooka and Harakomiya were established within Nishitama District, then a portion of Kanagawa Prefecture. The entire district was transferred to the administrative control of Tokyo Metropolis on April 1, 1893. On April 1, 1921, Kusabana, Sugao, Sedooka and Harakomiya merged to form Tasai Village and on April 1, 1955, Higashiakiru, Nishiakiru and Tasai merged to form Akita Town. Akita was elevated to city status on May 5, 1972, at which time it renamed itself Akigawa City.

In 1995, the town of Itsukaichi merged with Akigawa to form the new city of Akiruno, and thus no longer exists as an independent municipality.

At the time of its merger, the city had an estimated population of 54,654 and a density of 2,435 persons per km^{2}. The total area was 22.44 km^{2}.
