= Itsukaichi, Tokyo =

Itsukaichi 五日市町
- Former municipality
- Flag Emblem

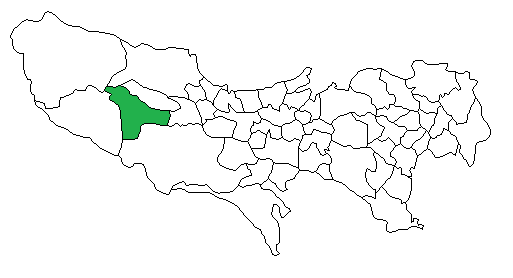
- Location of Itsukaichi in Tokyo Metropolis

- Location in Japan
- Coordinates: 35°45′08″N 139°16′00″E
- Country: Japan
- Region: Kantō region
- Prefecture: Tokyo Metropolis
- District: Nishitama District,
- Merged: September 1, 1995 (now part of Akiruno, Tokyo)

Area
  - Total: 50.90 km^{2} (19.65 sq mi)

Population (September 1, 1995)
  - Total: 22,252
  - Density: 437/km^{2} (1,130/sq mi)
- Time zone: UTC+09:00 (JST)

Itsukaichi (五日市町, Itsukaichi-machi) was a town located in Nishitama District, Tokyo Metropolis, Japan.

Itsukaichi Town, a medieval settlement, was promoted to town status within Kanagawa Prefecture in 1879, and merged with Konakano Village on April 1, 1889. The entire district was transferred to the administrative control of Tokyo Metropolis on April 1, 1893. The town expanded through annexation of the neighboring villages of Mitsusato and Meiji in 1918, and with Masuko, Tokura and Komiya in 1955. In 1995, the town of Itsukaichi merged with the city of Akigawa to form the new city of Akiruno, and thus no longer exists as an independent municipality.

At the time of its merger, the town had an estimated population of 22,252 and a density of 437 persons per km^{2}. The total area was 50.90 km^{2}.

== Notable people from Itsukaichi ==
- Take Hagiwara (1873–1936), nurse
- Tsutomu Miyazaki (1962–2008), serial killer
