= Musashi-Hikida Station =

Railway station in Akiruno, Tokyo, Japan

JC84 Musashi-Hikida Station 武蔵引田駅
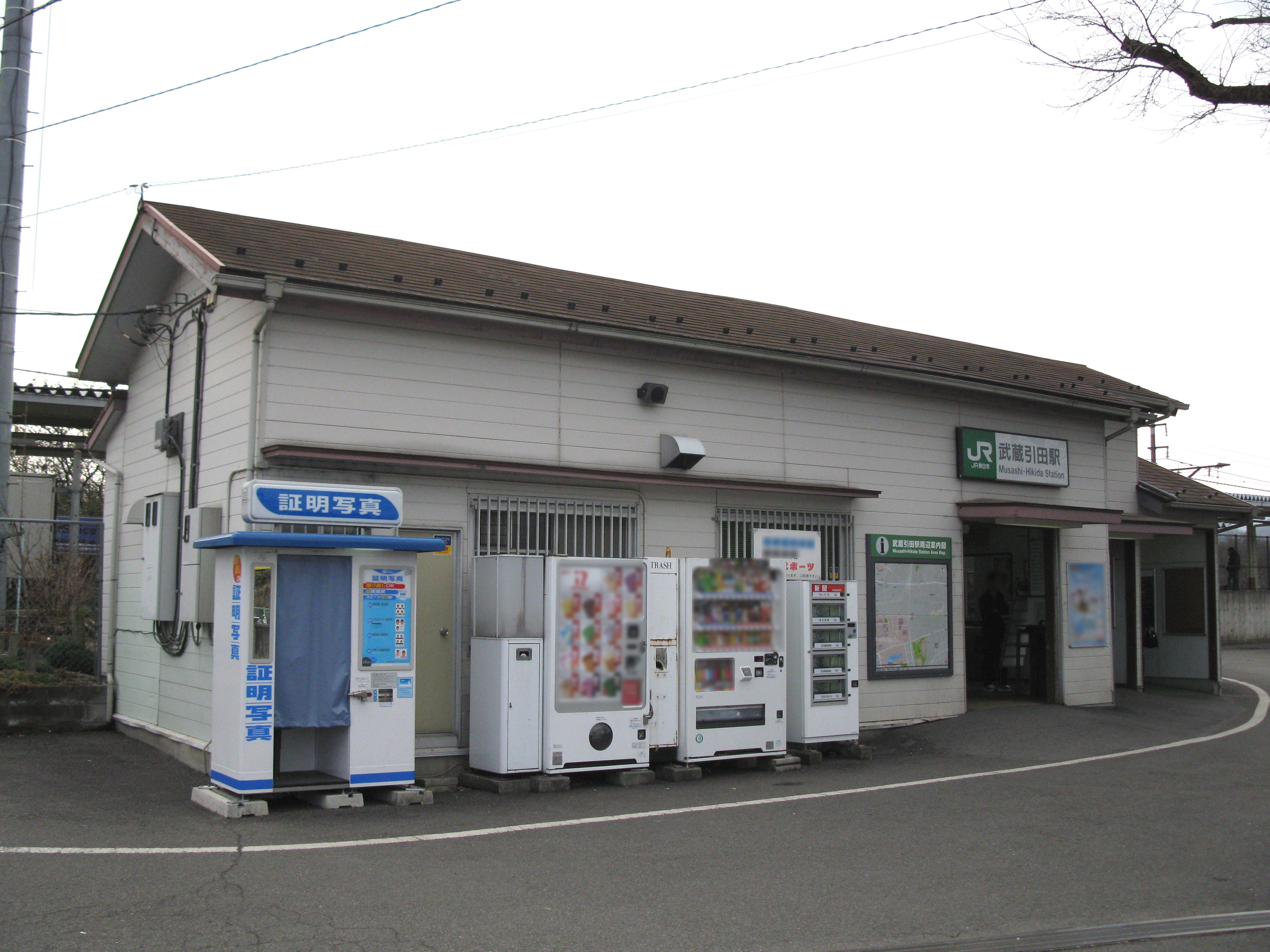
- Musashi-Hikida Station, in February 2009

General information
- Location: Hikida 16, Akiruno-shi, Tokyo 197-0834; Japan
- Coordinates: 35.7297°N 139.2702°E
- Operator: JR East
- Line: Itsukaichi Line
- Distance: 7.2 km from Haijima
- Platforms: 1 side platform
- Tracks: 1

Other information
- Status: Staffed
- Station code: JC84
- Website: Official website

History
- Opened: 4 April 1930
- Former names: Byōinmae Station (until 1944)

Passengers
- FY2019: 3235

Services
Preceding station	JR East	Following station
Musashi-Masuko JC85 towards Musashi-Itsukaichi	Itsukaichi Line Ōme Special Rapid Rapid Local	Akigawa JC83 towards Haijima
Location
- Location within Tokyo Location within Japan

Musashi-Hikida Station (武蔵引田駅, Musashi-Hikida-eki) is a passenger railway station located in the city of Akiruno, Tokyo, Japan, operated by East Japan Railway Company (JR East).

== Lines ==
Musashi-Hikida Station is served by the Itsukaichi Line, and is located 7.2 kilometers from the starting point of the line at Haijima Station.

== Station layout ==
This station consists of one side platform serving a single bi-directional ground-level track, with a small station building. The station is staffed.

=== Platform ===
/	Itsukaichi Line	for Musashi-Itsukaichi for Haijima, Tachikawa, Shinjuku, Tokyo

== History ==
The station opened on 4 April 1930 as Byōinmae Station (病院前停留場) on the Itsukaichi Railway. It was renamed to its present name on 1 April 1944. With the privatization of Japanese National Railways (JNR) on 1 April 1987, the station came under the control of JR East.

== Passenger statistics ==
In fiscal 2019, the station was used by an average of 3,235 passengers daily (boarding passengers only).

The passenger figures for previous years are as shown below.

Fiscal year	Daily average
2005	4,026
2010	3,848
2015	3,538

== Surrounding area ==
- Akiru Medical Center

== See also ==
- List of railway stations in Japan
