= Akiruno =

Akiruno あきる野市
- City
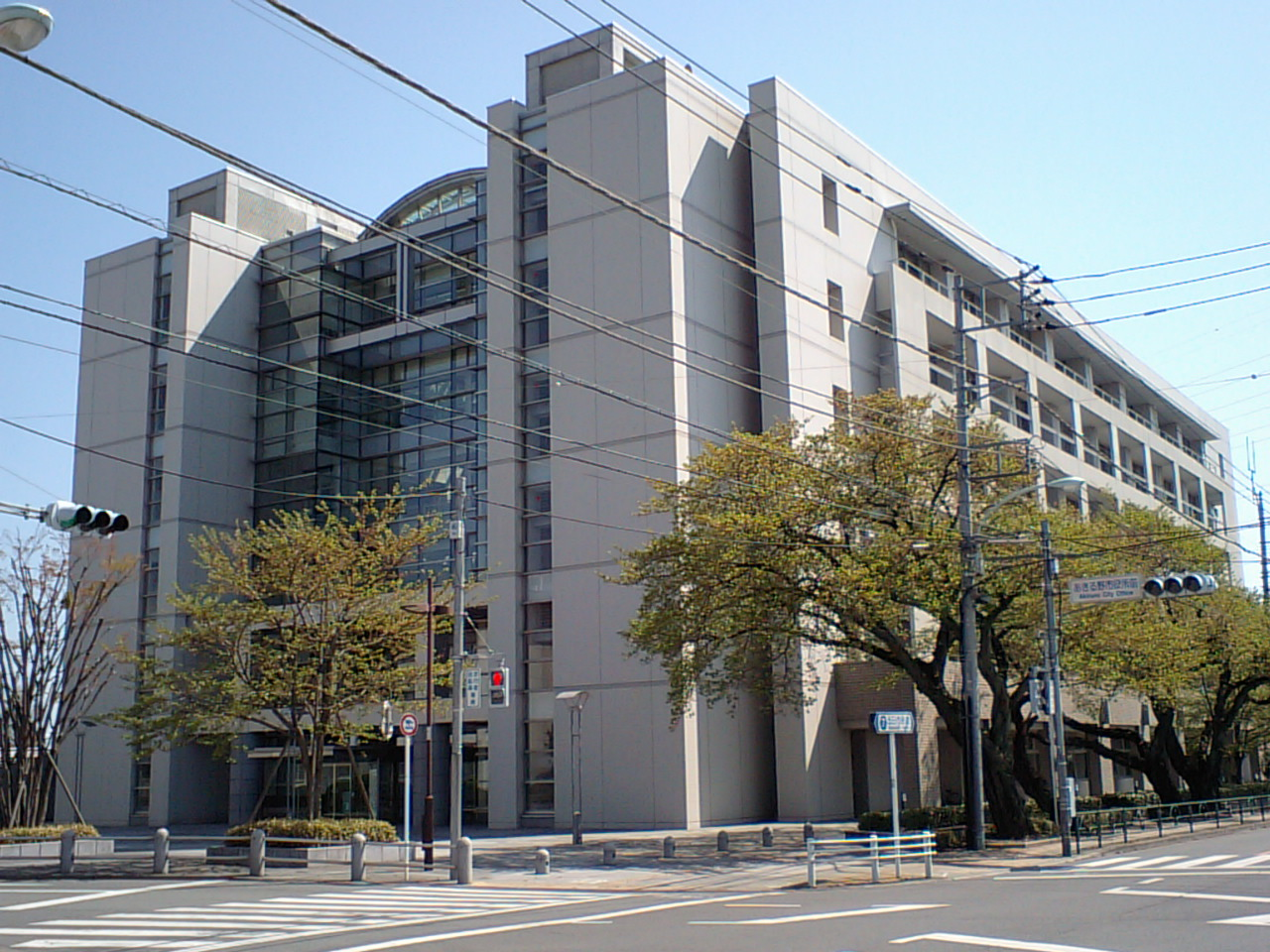
- Akiruno City Hall

- Flag Seal

- Location of Akiruno in Tokyo

- Coordinates: 35°43′44.1″N 139°17′38.7″E
- Country: Japan
- Region: Kantō
- Prefecture: Tokyo

Government
  - Mayor: Hiroyuki Nakajima (since September 2022)

Area
  - Total: 73.47 km^{2} (28.37 sq mi)

Population (April 2021)
  - Total: 80,177
  - Density: 1,091/km^{2} (2,826/sq mi)
- Time zone: UTC+9 (Japan Standard Time)
- Symbols
  - Tree: Tea Olive
  - Flower: Chrysanthemum
  - Bird: Japanese wagtail
- Phone number: 042-558-1111
- Address: 350 Ninomiya, Akiruno-shi, Tokyo 197-0814
- Website: Official website

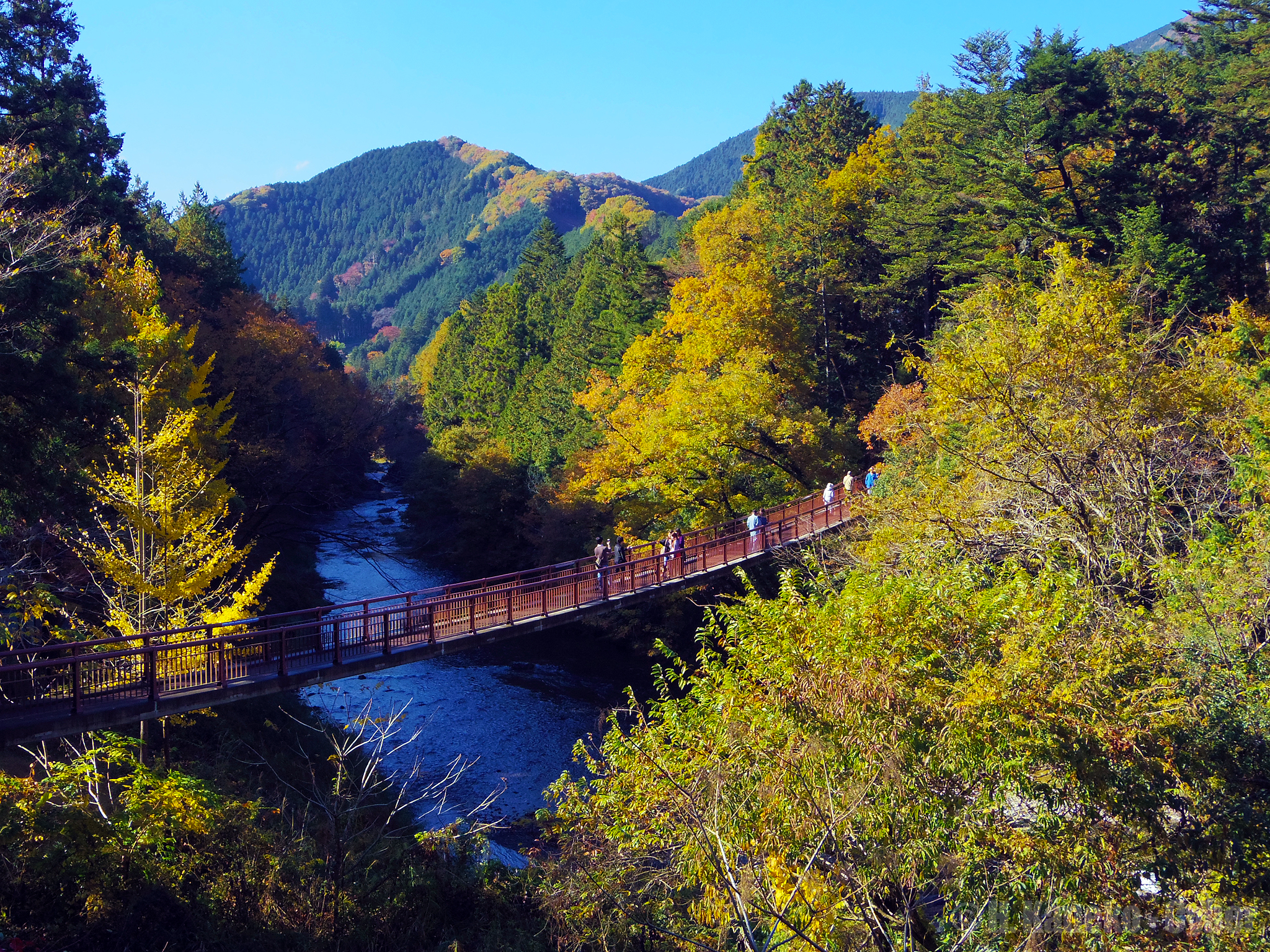
Akigawa River in the autumn

Akiruno (あきる野市, Akiruno-shi; Japanese pronunciation: [ä̀.k̟ʲí.ɾɯ̈́.nó̞(.ɕì)]) is a city located in the western portion of the Tokyo Metropolis, Japan. As of 1 April 2021, the city had an estimated population of 80,177, and a population density of 1100 persons per km^{2}. The total area of the city is 73.47 square kilometres (28.37 sq mi).

== Geography ==
Akiruno is located in the foothills of the Okutama Mountains of western Tokyo, approximately 40-50 kilometers from the center of Tokyo. The Aki River and Hirai River flow through the city. It measures approximately 18 kilometers form east-to-west by 12.7 kilometers from north-to-south.

Because of its rich nature and calm surroundings compared to central Tokyo, and because of access to transportation, many tourists choose Akiruno for their vacation. Especially Seoto-no-yo Spa is famous for its high quality alkaline spring and is referred to as the "beautiful skin spa". Also, Akiruno is one of the most popular place for BBQ, biking and hiking. One of the most famous trail running cups in Japan, The Hasetsune Cup, is held in Akiruno.

=== Surrounding municipalities ===
Tokyo Metropolis

- Fussa
- Hachioji
- Hamura
- Hinode
- Hinohara
- Okutama
- Ōme

=== Climate ===
Akiruno has a humid subtropical climate (Köppen Cfa) characterized by warm summers and cool winters with light to no snowfall. The average annual temperature in Akiruno is 13.2 °C. The average annual rainfall is 1998 mm with September as the wettest month. The temperatures are highest on average in August, at around 24.6 °C, and lowest in January, at around 1.9 °C. During the winter months, snowfall in the mountainous areas is almost daily. There is a difference in climate between the eastern part near the former Akigawa city and the western part near the former Itsukaichi town, and the temperature in the western part is generally lower than that in the eastern part.

== Demographics ==
Per Japanese census data, the population of Akiruno has recently plateaued after a long period of growth.

Historical population
Year	Pop.	±%
1920	19,363	—
1930	21,127	+9.1%
1940	21,827	+3.3%
1950	28,162	+29.0%
1960	29,296	+4.0%
1970	45,187	+54.2%
1980	62,810	+39.0%
1990	71,940	+14.5%
2000	78,351	+8.9%
2010	80,868	+3.2%
2020	79,262	−2.0%

== History ==
The area of present-day Akiruno was part of ancient Musashi Province. In the post-Meiji Restoration cadastral reform of July 22, 1878, the area became part of Nishitama District in Kanagawa Prefecture. The town of Itsukaichi was created on April 1, 1889, with the establishment of the modern municipalities system. Nishitama District was transferred to the administrative control of Tokyo Metropolis on April 1, 1893. Itsukaichi expanded through annexation of neighboring villages in 1918 and 1955. Higashiakiru, Nishiakiru, and Tasai grouped together on April 1, 1955, to form the town of Akigawa, which was elevated to city status on May 5, 1971. The city of Akiruno was created on September 1, 1995, by the merger of the city of Akigawa with the neighboring town of Itsukaichi.

== Government ==
Akiruno has a mayor-council form of government with a directly elected mayor and a unicameral city council of 21 members. Akiruno, collectively with the municipalities of Fussa, Hamura, Mizuho, Hinode, Hinohara and Okutama, contributes two members to the Tokyo Metropolitan Assembly. In terms of national politics, the city is part of Tokyo 25th district of the lower house of the Diet of Japan.

== Education ==
Akiruno has ten public elementary schools and six public junior high schools operated by the city government, and two public high schools operated by the Tokyo Metropolitan Board of Education. There are also one private elementary school, one private middle school, and one private high school. Tokyo Metropolis also operates one special education school for the handicapped.

Metropolitan high schools:

- Akirudai High School
- Itsukaichi High School

Municipal junior high schools:

- Akita (秋多中学校)
- Higashi (東中学校)
- Itsukaichi (五日市中学校)
- Masuko (増戸中学校)
- Mido (御堂中学校)
- Nishi (西中学校)

Municipal elementary schools:

- Higashi Akiru (東秋留小学校)
- Ichinotani (一の谷小学校)
- Itsukaichi (五日市小学校)
- Kusahana (草花小学校)
- Maeda (前田小学校)
- Masuko (増戸小学校)
- Minami Akiru (南秋留小学校)
- Nishi Akiru (西秋留小学校)
- Tasai (多西小学校)
- Yashiro (屋城小学校)

Private:

- Akiruno Gakuen School
- Tokai University Sugao High School and Sugao Junior High School

== Transportation ==
=== Railway ===
JR East – Itsukaichi Line

- Higashi-Akiru – Akigawa – Musashi-Hikida – Musashi-Masuko – Musashi-Itsukaichi

=== Highway ===
- Ken-Ō Expressway
- National Route 411

== Sister cities ==
- Marlborough, Massachusetts, United States, since November 3, 1998

== Notable people from Akiruno, Tokyo ==
- Tomoo Amino, Japanese former professional basketball player
- Taiki Morii, Japanese alpine skier
- Masato Shibata, Japanese professional wrestler
