= Aki River =

Japanese river, a major tributary of the Tama River

Coordinates: 35.716737°N 139.322396°E

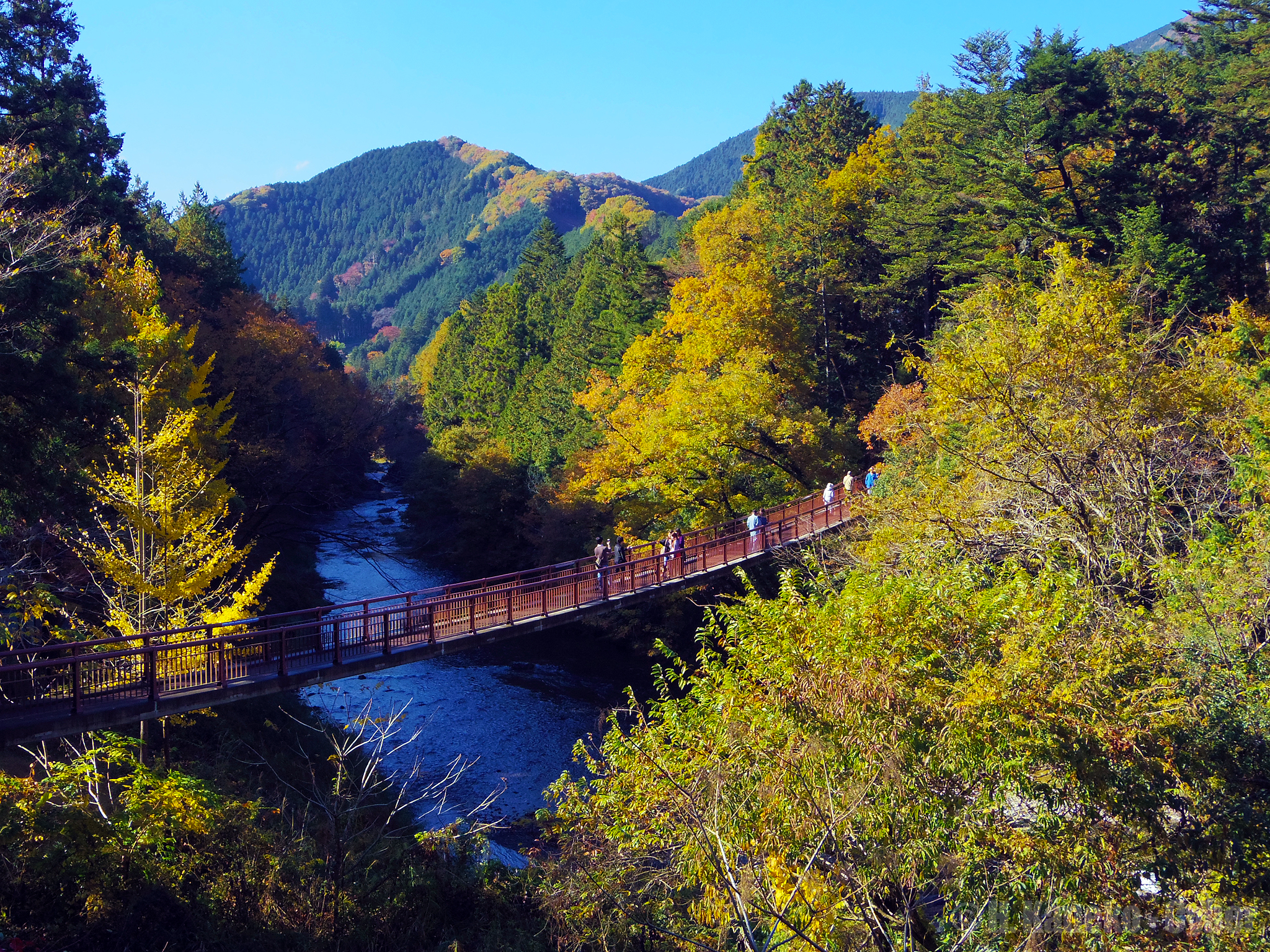
- Akigawa Gorge, in the autumn. Near, but west of Tokyo.

- Location within Japan
- Native name: 秋川 (Japanese)

The Aki River (also, the Akigawa River) is a river in Japan. The Aki River flows west of Tokyo Metropolitan Area. It is a major tributary of the Tama River, The Japanese name, 秋川, means "Autumn River."

The name Akigawa River may seem strange for some people as kawa/gawa 川 in Japanese means river so people may think the name should be Aki river, but that is wrong, because the names of lakes in Japanese usually have kawa/gawa at the end of the name.

== Akigawa Lake ==
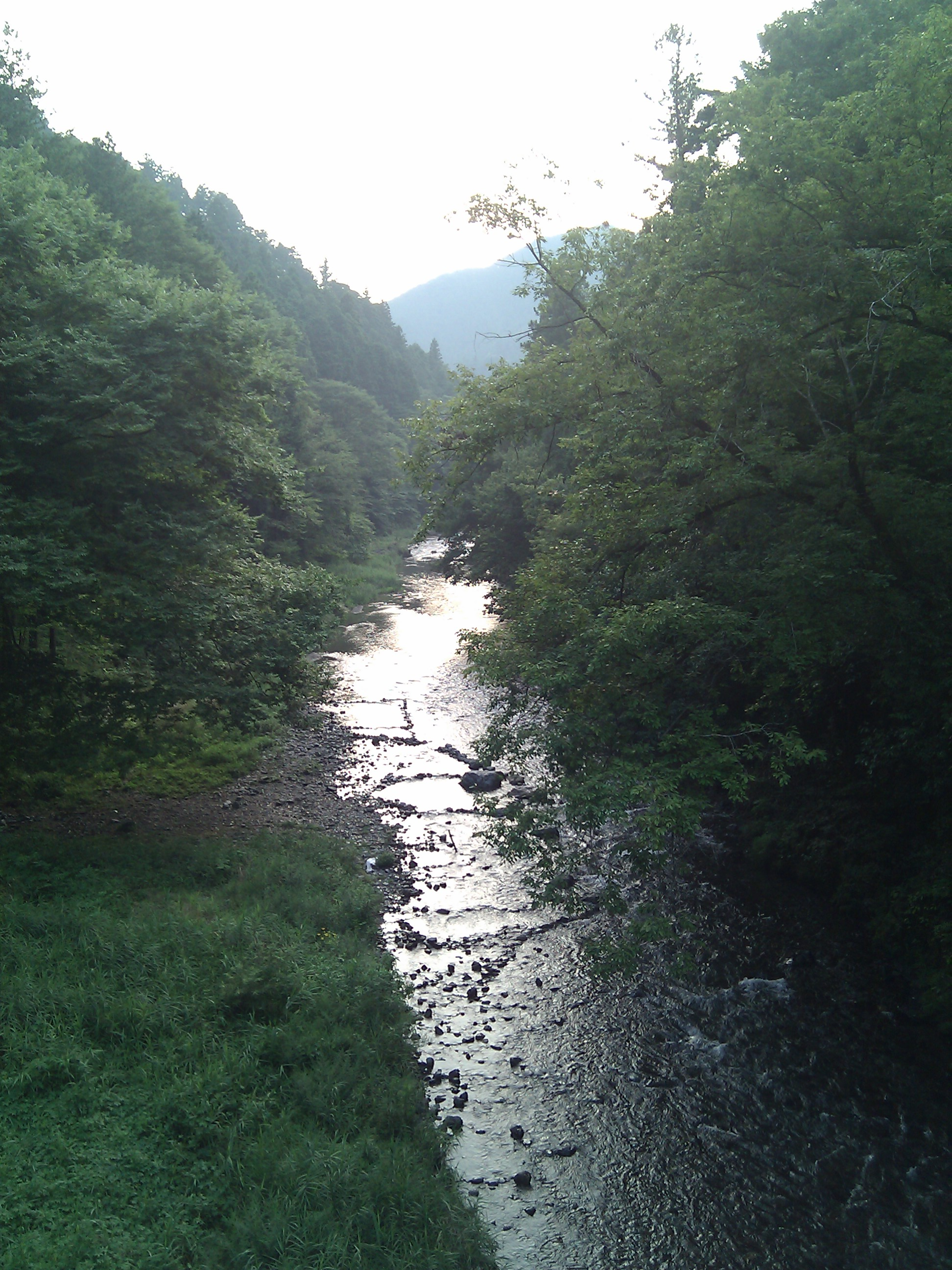
The Aki River. From Ishibune Bridge

Akigawa Lake, situated in the western part of Tokyo, offers a blend of natural beauty, cultural significance, and recreational opportunities. Nestled in the mountainous region of Akiruno City, this lake serves as an escape from Tokyo.

== Course of the river ==
The Akigawa flows through Akigawa Lake, and the towns of Akiruno and Hinohara, and through Kanagawa and Tokyo Prefectures.

== Recreation area ==
The river's gorge is a popular recreation area.

== See also ==
- Akigawa Station

== External links and references ==
- On recreation in the Akigawa
- More recreation
- More recreation
- On its gorge
- Photos
- A Youtube
- A second Youtube
- A third Youtube, people playing in the Akigawa
- The river's Facebook page
