= Musashi-Masuko Station =

Railway station in Akiruno, Tokyo, Japan

JC85 Musashi-Masuko Station 武蔵増戸駅
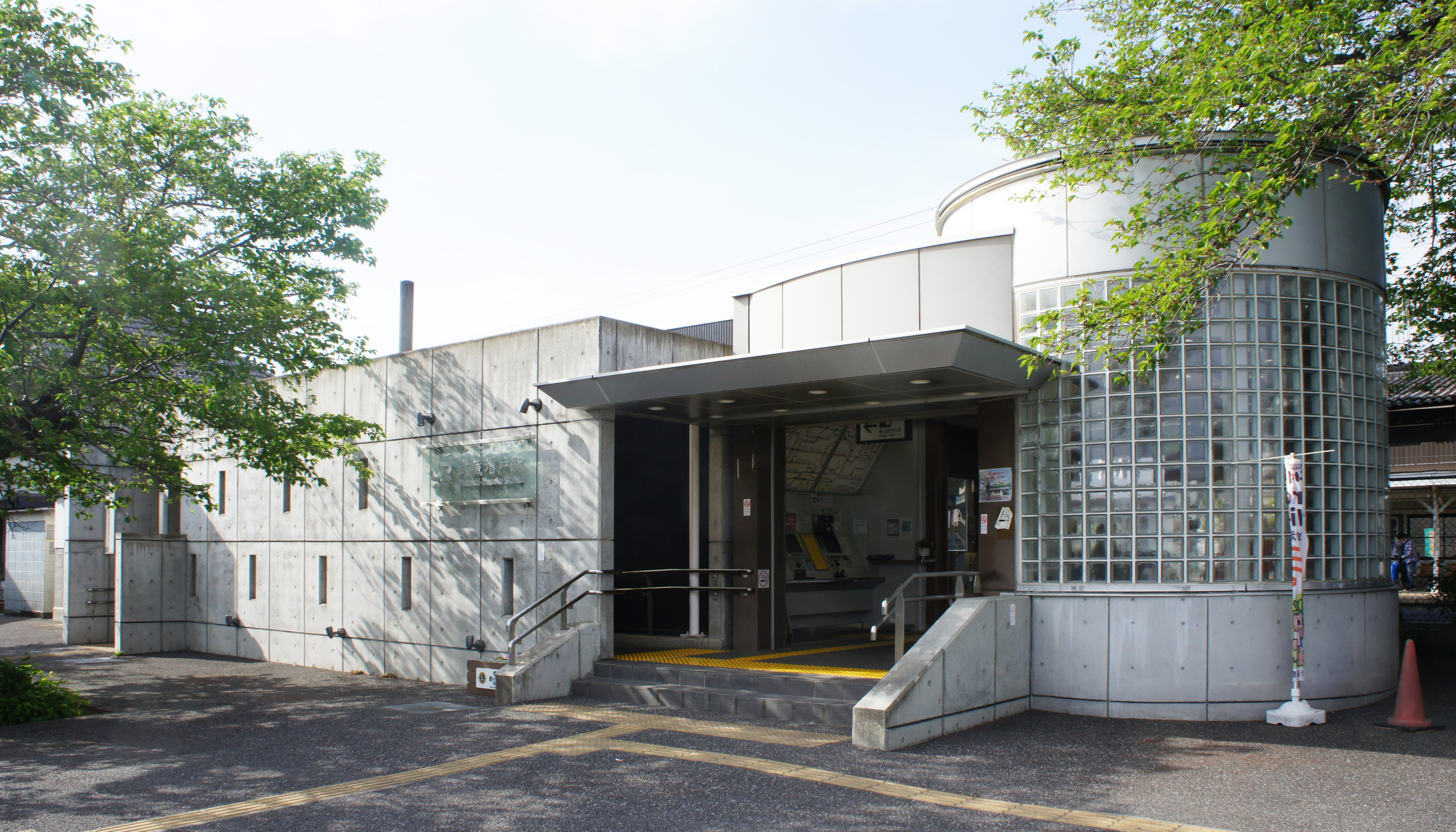
- Musashi-Masuko Station in April 2021

General information
- Location: Ina, Akiruno-shi, Tokyo 190-0142; Japan
- Coordinates: 35.7311°N 139.2563°E
- Operator: JR East
- Line: Itsukaichi Line
- Distance: 8.5 km from Haijima
- Platforms: 1 side platform + 1 island platform
- Tracks: 3

Other information
- Status: Staffed
- Station code: JC85
- Website: Official website

History
- Opened: 21 April 1925
- Rebuilt: 2011
- Former names: Masuko Station (until May 1925)

Passengers
- FY2019: 2,481

Services
| Preceding station | JR East | Following station |
|---|---|---|
| Musashi-Itsukaichi JC86 Terminus | Itsukaichi Line Ōme Special Rapid Rapid Local | Musashi-Hikida JC84 towards Haijima |
Location
- Location within Tokyo Location within Japan

Musashi-Masuko Station (武蔵増戸駅, Musashi-Masuko-eki) is a passenger railway station located in the city of Akiruno, Tokyo, Japan, operated by East Japan Railway Company (JR East).

== Lines ==
Musashi-Masuko Station is served by the Itsukaichi Line, and is located 8.5 kilometers from the starting point of the line at Haijima Station.

== Station layout ==
This station consists of one side platform and one island platform, with a small station building located adjacent to the side platform; however, track 3 on the outside of the island platform is not normally used, and is used as a siding at night. The station is staffed.

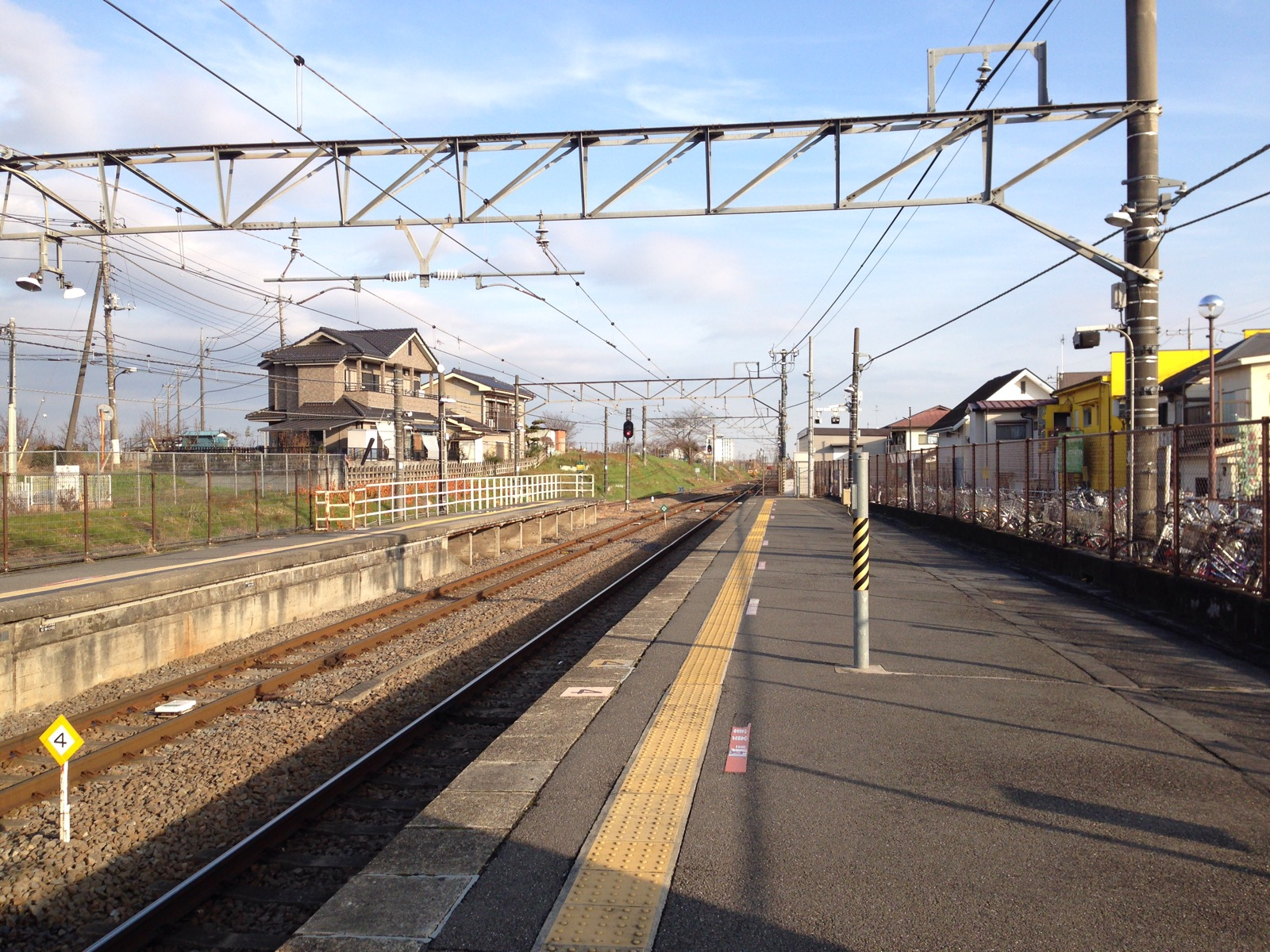
The platforms in December 2014

=== Platforms ===
| 1 | Itsukaichi Line | for Musashi-Itsukaichi |
| 2 | Itsukaichi Line | for Haijima, Tachikawa, Shinjuku, Tokyo |

== History ==
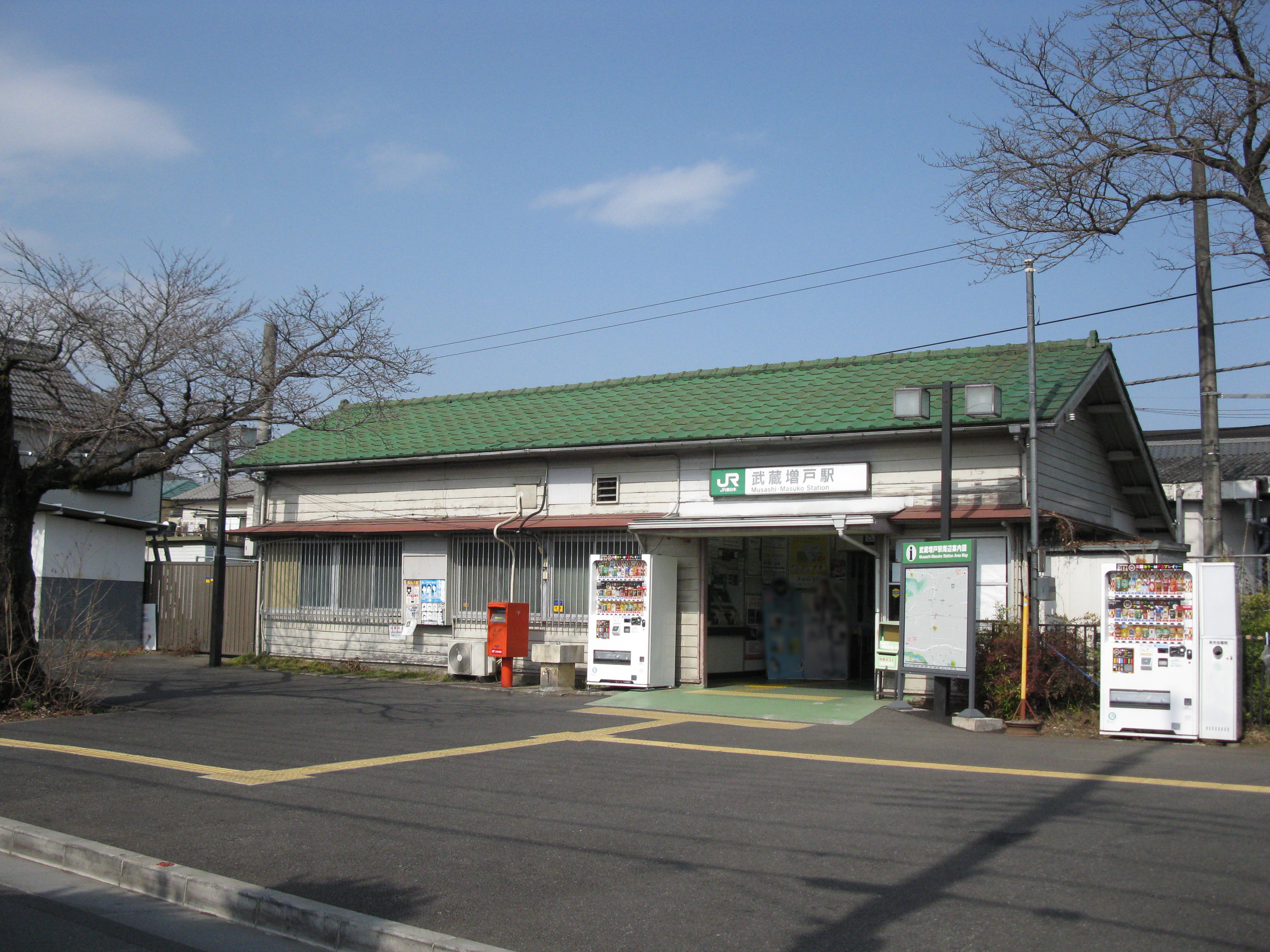
The station in February 2009, before rebuilding

The station opened on 21 April 1925 as Masuko Station (増戸駅) on the Itsukaichi Railway; however it was renamed Musashi-Masuko on 16 May of the same year. With the privatization of Japanese National Railways (JNR) on 1 April 1987, the station came under the control of JR East. A new station building was completed in March 2011.

== Surrounding area ==
- Masuko Post Office
- Masuko Elementary School
- Masuko Junior High School

== Passenger statistics ==
In fiscal 2019, the station was used by an average of 2,481 passengers daily (boarding passengers only).

The passenger figures for previous years are as shown below.

| Fiscal year | Daily average |
|---|---|
| 2005 | 2,886 |
| 2010 | 2,660 |
| 2015 | 2,634 |

== See also ==
- List of railway stations in Japan
