= Akigawa Station =

Railway station in Akiruno, Tokyo, Japan

JC83 Akigawa Station 秋川駅
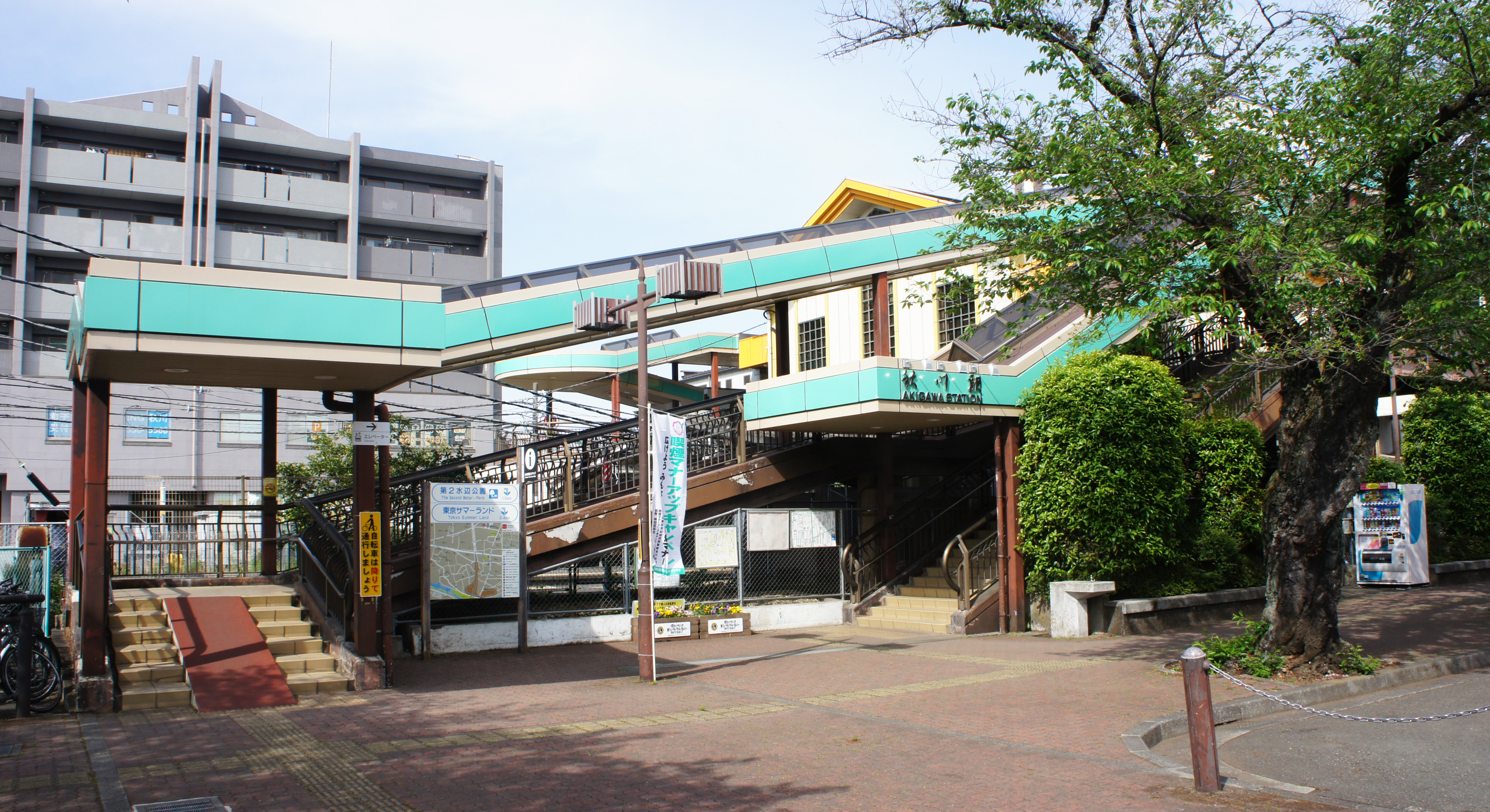
- Akigawa Station south entrance in April 2021

General information
- Location: Aburadai, Akiruno-shi, Tokyo 197-0827; Japan
- Coordinates: 35.7277°N 139.2871°E
- Operator: JR East
- Line: Itsukaichi Line
- Distance: 5.7 km from Haijima
- Platforms: 2 side platforms
- Tracks: 2

Other information
- Status: Staffed
- Station code: JC83
- Website: Official website

History
- Opened: 21 April 1925
- Former names: Nishi-Akiru Station (until 1987)

Passengers
- FY2019: 6499

Services
Preceding station	JR East	Following station
Musashi-Hikida JC84 towards Musashi-Itsukaichi	Itsukaichi Line Ōme Special Rapid Rapid Local	Higashi-Akiru JC82 towards Haijima
Location
- Location within Tokyo Location within Japan

Akigawa Station (秋川駅, Akigawa-eki) is a passenger railway station in Akiruno, Tokyo, Japan, operated by the East Japan Railway Company (JR East).

== Lines ==
Akigawa Station is served by the Itsukaichi Line, and is located 5.7 kilometers from the starting point of the line at Haijima Station.

== Station layout ==
This station consists of two side platforms serving two ground-level tracks, with an elevated station building located above the tracks and platforms. The station is staffed.

=== Platforms ===
1	Itsukaichi Line	for Musashi-Itsukaichi
2	Itsukaichi Line	for Haijima, Tachikawa, Shinjuku, Tokyo

== History ==
The station opened on 21 April 1925 as Nishi-Akiru Station (西秋留駅). It was renamed Akigawa Station on 31 March 1987. With the privatization of Japanese National Railways (JNR) on 1 April 1987, the station came under the control of JR East.

== Passenger statistics ==
In fiscal 2019, the station was used by an average of 6,499 passengers daily (boarding passengers only).

The passenger figures for previous years are as shown below.

Fiscal year	Daily average
2005	7,585
2010	7,358
2015	7,253

== Surrounding area ==
- Aki River

== See also ==
- List of railway stations in Japan
