= Itsukaichi Line =

Railway line in Tokyo, Japan

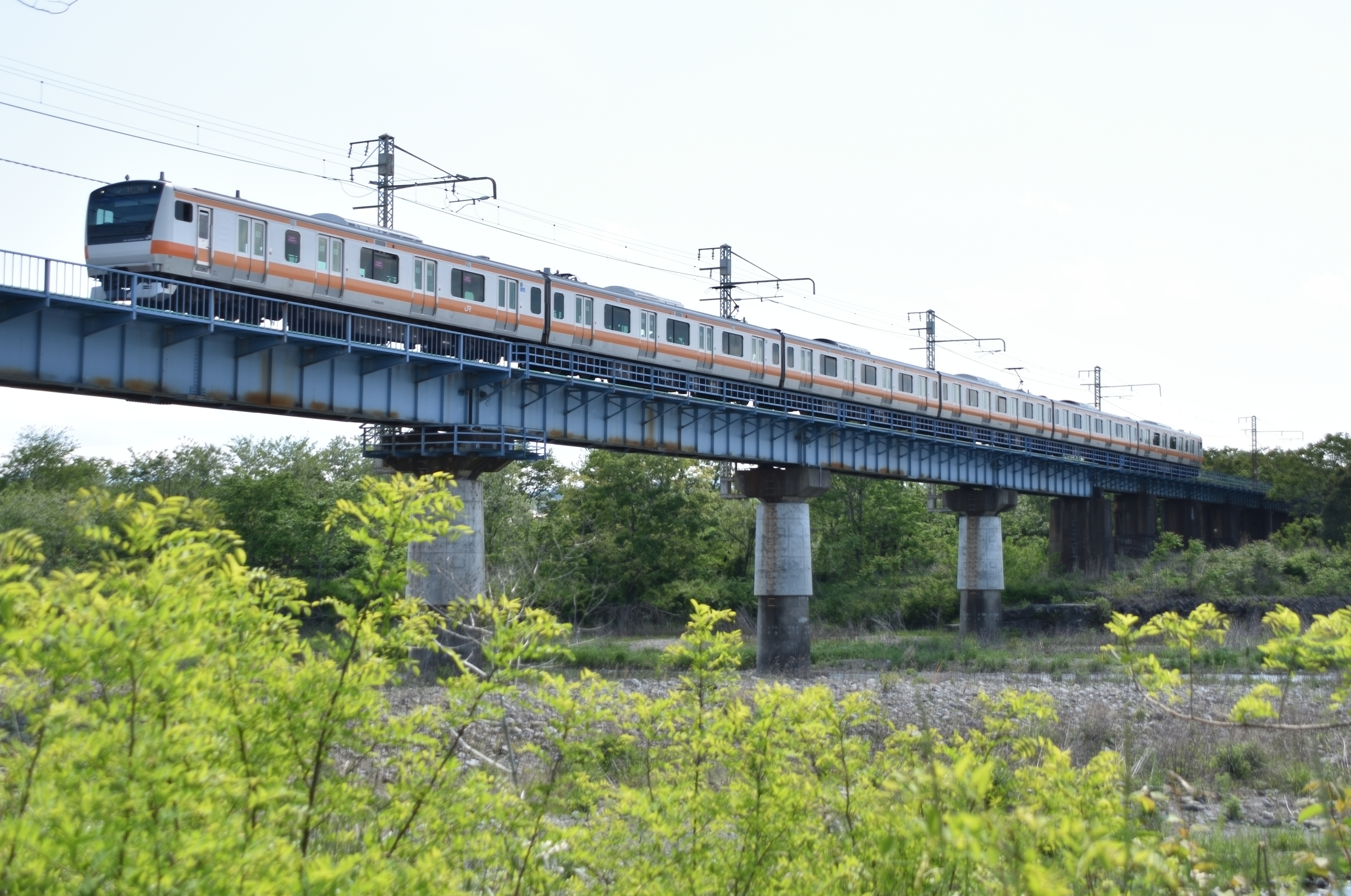
- An E233 series EMU between Higashi-Akiru and Kumagawa

Overview
- Native name: 五日市線
- Locale: Tokyo
- Termini: Haijima; Musashi-Itsukaichi
- Stations: 7

Service
- Type: Heavy rail
- Operator: JR East

History
- Opened: April 21, 1925; 101 years ago

Technical
- Line length: 11.1 km (6.90 mi)
- Number of tracks: Single-track
- Track gauge: 1,067 mm (3 ft 6 in)
- Electrification: 1,500 V DC overhead catenary
- Operating speed: 85 km/h (53 mph)
Route map

The Itsukaichi Line (五日市線, Itsukaichi-sen) is a railway line operated by East Japan Railway Company (JR East) in Tokyo, Japan. It links Musashi-Itsukaichi Station in the city of Akiruno with Haijima Station in the city of Akishima. From there, some trains travel through to Tachikawa Station via the Ōme Line, and select weekend/holiday services (branded as Holiday Rapid Akigawa) continue from Tachikawa along the Chūō Line to Tokyo Station. This line can only accommodate trains of 4- or 6-car lengths.

== Services ==
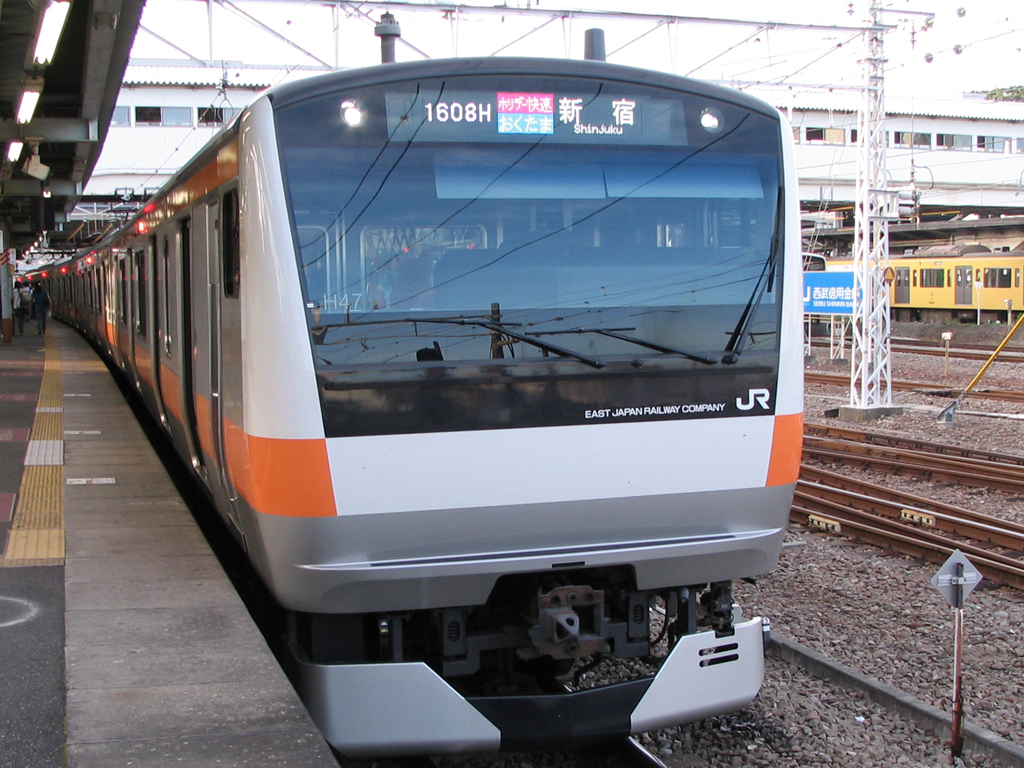
A Shinjuku-bound Holiday Rapid Okutama (E233 series EMU) at Haijima Station

=== Itsukaichi Line Local ===
Local trains stop at all stations between Musashi-Itsukaichi and Haijima.

=== Through services ===
The Itsukaichi Line, at times, runs through services along the Ōme Line . All through services into the Itsukaichi Line stop at every station on this line.

- Ōme - Itsukaichi Line through service: Some Itsukaichi Line operate through service to the Ōme Line via Haijima. They operate between Musashi-Itsukaichi and Tachikawa.

==== Former through services ====
- Chūō - Ōme - Itsukaichi Line through service: At rush hours, a few Chūō Line trains ran through services between Tokyo and the Itsukaichi Line via Haijima. These services were always joined with another through service train, which coupled / decoupled at Haijima. During morning rush, some trains from Musashi-Itsukaichi on the Itsukaichi Line, and another train from Ōme on the Ōme Line, or from Hakonegasaki / Komagawa on the Hachiko Line, coupled at Haijima, and headed for Tokyo. During evening rush, the reverse occurred. These trains operated until 11 March 2022.

=== Holiday Rapid Akigawa ===
Until 18 March 2023, Holiday Rapid Akigawa services ran on weekends on this line. See the article for more information.

== Stations ==
- All stations are located in Tokyo, and all services stop at every station.
- On the "Track" column, stations where trains can pass each other are marked with "◇", "∨" and "∧", and those where trains cannot pass each other are marked "｜".

No.	Station	Japanese	Distance (km)		Transfers	Track	Location
No.	Station	Japanese	Between stations	Total	Transfers	Track	Location
JC55	Haijima	拝島	-	0.0	Ōme Line (some through services); ■ Hachiko Line; ■ Seibu Haijima Line	∨	Akishima
JC81	Kumagawa	熊川	1.1	1.1		｜	Fussa
JC82	Higashi-Akiru	東秋留	2.4	3.5		◇	Akiruno
JC83	Akigawa	秋川	2.2	5.7		◇	Akiruno
JC84	Musashi-Hikida	武蔵引田	1.5	7.2		｜	Akiruno
JC85	Musashi-Masuko	武蔵増戸	1.3	8.5		◇	Akiruno
JC86	Musashi-Itsukaichi	武蔵五日市	2.6	11.1		∧	Akiruno

An extension, via a switchback, formerly operated to Musashi-Iwai Station. It closed to passenger traffic in 1971 and to freight in 1982.

== History ==
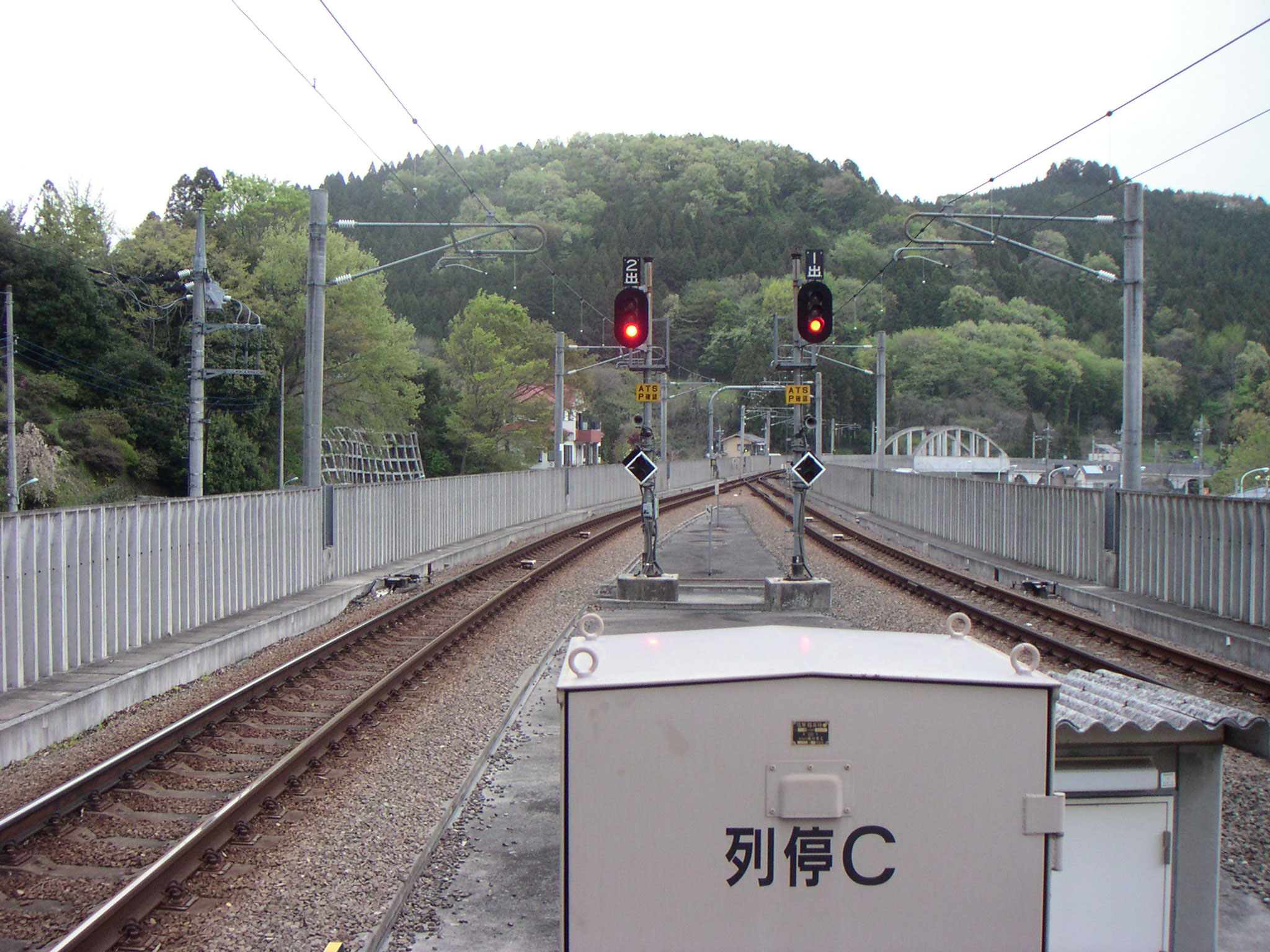
Looking from Musashi-Itsukaichi Station towards Musashi-Masuko Station

The Itsukaichi Line was built by the Itsukaichi Railway in 1925. In 1930, all sections (Tachikawa - Haijima - Musashi-Itsukaichi - Musashi-Iwai) were opened. There were two competing railways between Tachikawa and Haijima: the Ōme Electric Railway (now the Ōme Line) and the Itsukaichi Railway. In 1940, the Itsukaichi Railway was taken over by the Nambu Railway, becoming the Nambu Railway Itsukaichi Line. In 1944, Nambu Railway was nationalized and this line became the JGR Itsukaichi Line. At the same time, the section of the line between Tachikawa and Haijima was deemed non-essential and closed. However, the Tachikawa - Musashi-Uenohara and Musahi-Uenohara - Nishi-Tachikawa sections of the former Nambu Railway are still used by Chūō Main Line and Nambu Line trains traveling to and from the southern area of Tachikawa Station.

=== Chronology ===
- 24 April 1925: Itsukaichi Railway opens between Haijima (temporary) and Itsukaichi stations (10.62 km (6.60 mi)). Haijima (temporary), Higashi-Akiru, Nishi-Akiru, Masuko, and Itsukaichi stations open.
- 15 May 1925: Extension from Haijima (temporary) Station to Haijima Station opens; Haijima (temporary) Station closes.
- 16 May 1925: Masuko Station renamed Musashi-Masuko Station.
- 1 June 1925: Itsukaichi Station renamed Musashi-Itsukaichi Station.
- 20 September 1925: Musashi-Itsukaichi - Musashi-Iwai section opens; Okuno, Musashi-Iwai stations open.
- 1 July 1926: Tamagawa Station (freight only) opens.
- 1 April 1930: Distance markers changed from miles to kilometres.
- 4 April 1930: Construction of Byōinmae Station authorized.
- 13 July 1930: Tachikawa - Haijima extension opens; Musashi-Uenohara, Gouchi, Musashi-Fukushima, Minami-Nakagami, Miyazawa, Ōgami, Musashi-Tanaka, Minami-Haijima stations open.
- 28 May 1931: Kumagawa Station opens.
- 8 December 1931: Musashi-Tanaka - Haijima-Tamagawa freight branch (1.6 km (0.99 mi)) opens; Haijima-Tamagawa Station (freight only) opens. Tamagawa Station is renamed Musashi-Tamagawa Station.
- 3 October 1940: Line taken over by Nambu Railway, becomes Itsukaichi Line. Musashi-Tamagawa Station closes.
- 1 April 1944: Line is nationalized. Byōinmae Station renamed Musashi-Hikita Station. Musashi-Uenohara, Miyazawa, and Musashi-Tanaka stations close. Origin of freight branch (Musashi-Tanama - Haijima-Tamagawa) moved to Minami-Haijima Station (+1.4 km). Distance between Musashi-Itsukaichi and Musashi-Iwai shortened by 0.1 km (0.062 mi).
- 11 October 1944: Tachikawa - Haijima section of Main Line and Minami-Haijima - Haijima-Tamagawa section of freight branch close. Gouchi, Musashi-Fukushima, Minami-Nakagami, Ōgami, Minami-Haijima, Haijima-Tamagawa stations close.
- 17 February 1961: Haijima - Musashi-Iwai section electrified at 1,500 V DC.
- 1 February 1971: Ōkuno - Musashi-Iwai section of main line closes. Passenger service between Musashi-Itsukaichi and Ōkuno ceases; section becomes a freight branch. CTC installed in all sections.
- 15 November 1982: Musashi-Itsukaichi - Ōkuno freight branch closes; all freight services discontinued.
- 31 March 1987: Nishi-Akiru Station renamed Akigawa Station.
- 1 April 1987: Following privatization of JNR line becomes part of JR East.
- 18 March 2007: New E233 series trains enter service.
- 15 March 2008: Semi-automated door operation starts year-round using E233 series rolling stock.
- 20 August 2016: Station numbering introduced with stations being assigned station numbers between JC81 (Kumagawa) and JC86 (Musashi-Itsukaichi).
- 12 March 2022: Excluding all Holiday Rapid Akigawa services, all through service beyond Tachikawa station via the Ōme Line is discontinued.
- 18 March 2023: Holiday Rapid Akigawa services are abolished.
