= Musashi-Itsukaichi Station =

Railway station in Akiruno, Tokyo, Japan

JC86 Musashi-Itsukaichi Station 武蔵五日市駅
- Musashi-Itsukaichi Station in March 2026

General information
- Location: Tateya, Akiruno-shi, Tokyo 190-0166; Japan
- Coordinates: 35°43′56″N 139°13′41″E
- Operator: JR East
- Line: Itsukaichi Line
- Distance: 11.1 km from Haijima
- Platforms: 1 island platform
- Tracks: 2

Other information
- Station code: JC86
- Website: Official website

History
- Opened: 21 April 1925
- Former names: Itsukaichi Station (until June 1925)

Passengers
- FY2019: 4,164 daily

Services
Preceding station	JR East	Following station
Terminus	Itsukaichi Line Ōme Special Rapid Rapid Local	Musashi-Masuko JC85 towards Haijima
Location
- Location within Tokyo Location within Japan

Musashi-Itsukaichi Station (武蔵五日市駅, Musashi-Itsukaichi-eki) is a passenger railway station located in the city of Akiruno, Tokyo, Japan, operated by East Japan Railway Company (JR East).

== Lines ==
Musashi-Itsukaichi Station is the terminus of the Itsukaichi Line, and is located 11.1 kilometers from the starting point of the line at Haijima Station.

== Station layout ==
The station has one island platform serving two elevated bi-directional tracks. The station is staffed, and facilities within the building include a convenience store. The station has north and south exits.

=== Platform ===
1,2	Itsukaichi Line	for Haijima, Tachikawa, Shinjuku, Tokyo

== History ==
The station opened on 21 April 1925 as Itsukaichi Station (五日市駅); it was renamed Musashi-Itsukaichi Station on 1 June of the same year. With the privatization of Japanese National Railways (JNR) on 1 April 1987, the station came under the control of JR East.

== Passenger statistics ==
In fiscal 2019, the station was used by an average of 4,164 passengers daily (boarding passengers only).

The passenger figures for previous years are as shown below.

Fiscal year	Daily average
2005	4,810
2010	4,602
2015	4,528

== Surrounding area ==
- Nishi Tokyo Bus Itsukaichi Operations Facility
- Itsukaichi Kaidō (Tokyo Route 7, Suginami-Akiruno Line)
- Itsukaichi High School
- Itsukaichi Junior High School
- Itsukaichi Elementary School
- Akiruno City Itsukaichi Branch Office
- Aki River

== See also ==
- List of railway stations in Japan
