= List of cities in Tokyo Metropolis by population =

The following list sorts all cities (including towns and villages) in the Japanese metropolis of Tokyo with a population of more than 5,000 according to the 2020 Census. As of October 1, 2020, 31 places fulfill this criterion and are listed here. This list refers only to the population of individual cities, towns and villages within their defined limits, which does not include other municipalities or suburban areas within urban agglomerations.

== List ==
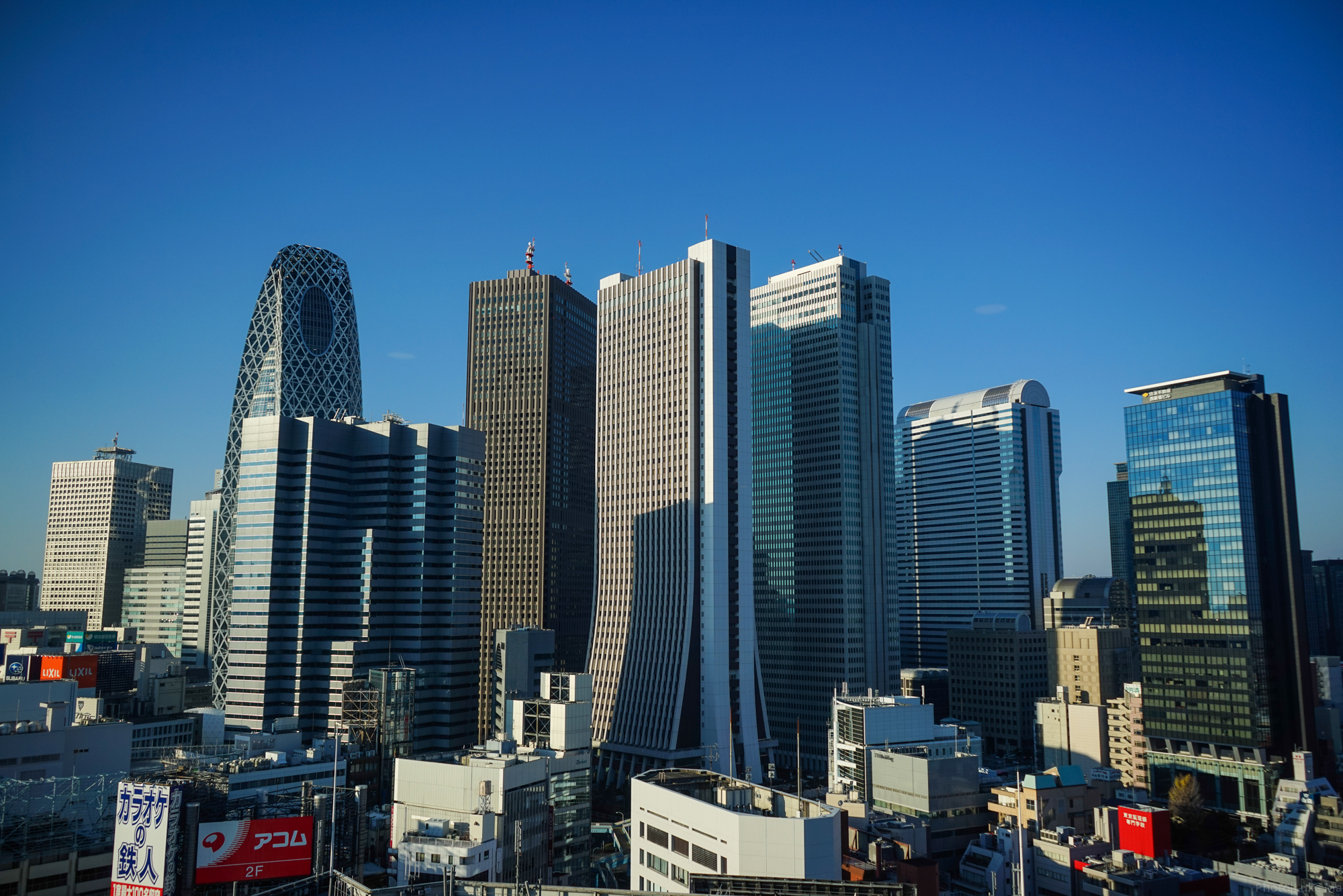
Tokyo

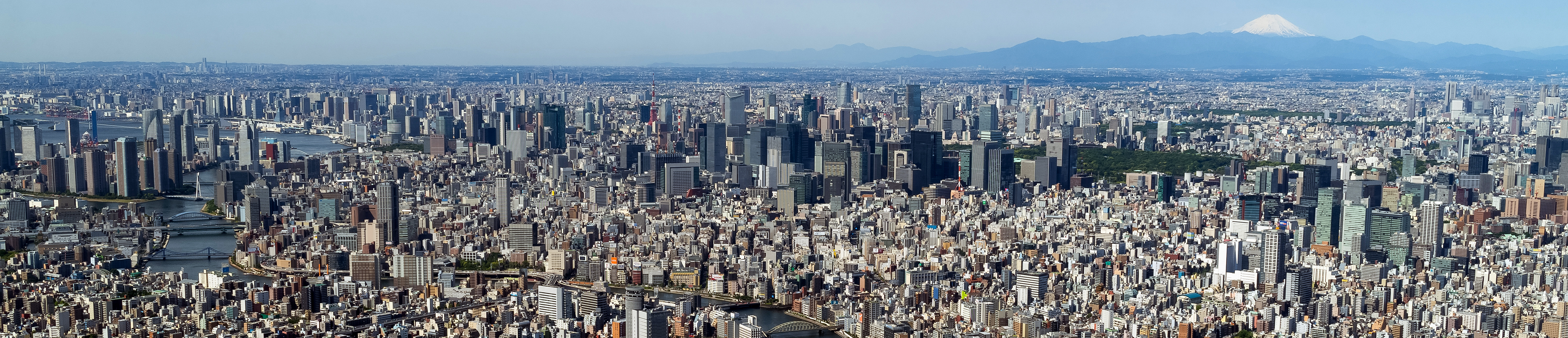
Tokyo

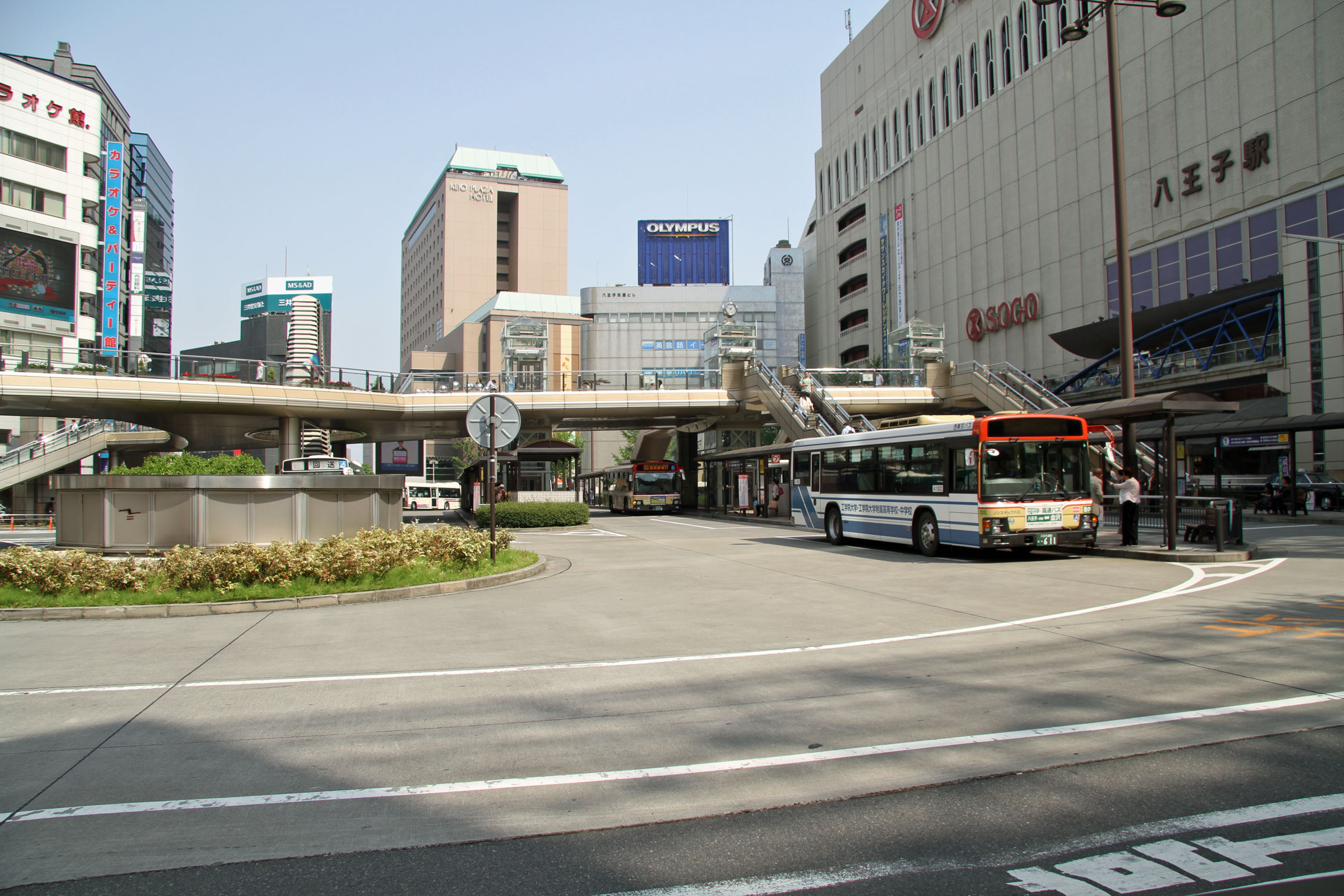
Hachiōji

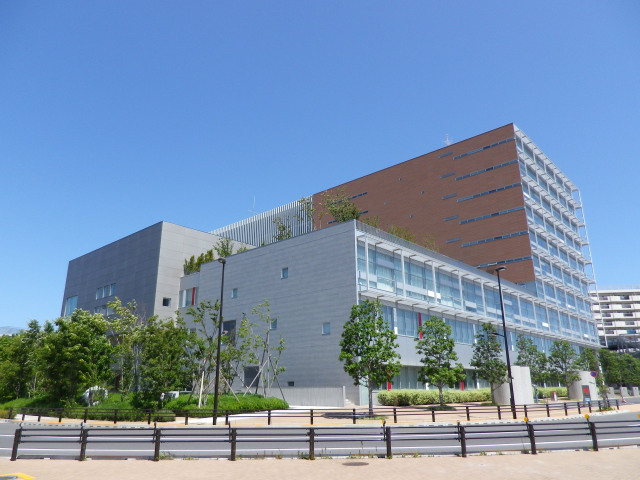
Machida

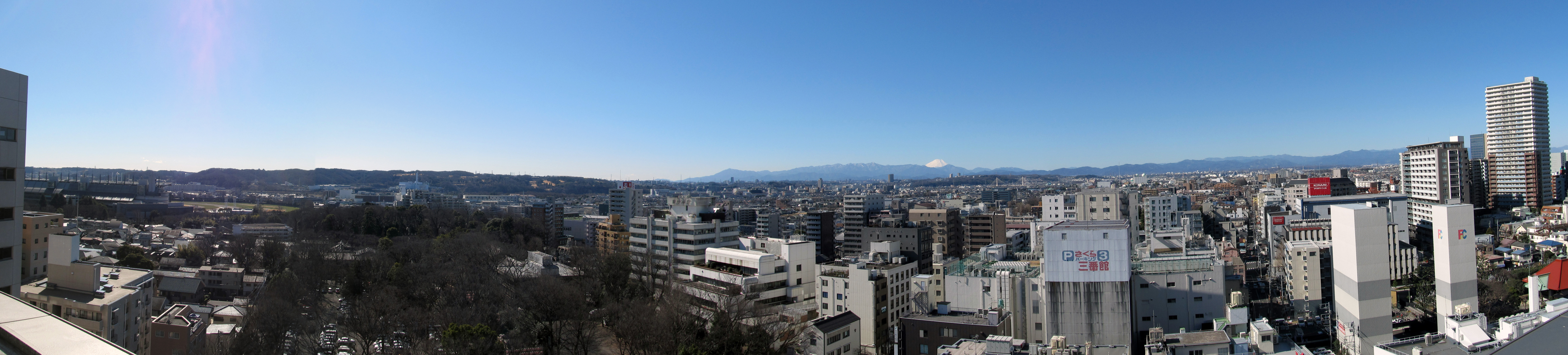
Fuchū

The following table lists the 61 cities, towns, villages and special wards in Tokyo, according to the 2020 Census. The table also gives an overview of the evolution of the population since the 1995 census. Officially, there has been no single Tokyo municipality since 1943. The listing for Tokyo in the table below is the combined population of the 23 special wards, which together form the former boundaries of Tokyo City before its merger with Tokyo Prefecture.

Rank (2020)	Name	Status	2020	2015	2010	2005	2000	1995
-	Tokyo	Special Wards Area	9,744,534	9,272,740	8,945,695	8,489,653	8,134,688	7,967,614
1	Setagaya	Special ward	943,664	903,346	877,138	841,165	814,901	781,104
2	Nerima	Special ward	752,608	721,722	716,124	692,339	658,132	635,746
3	Ōta	Special ward	748,081	717,082	693,373	665,674	650,331	636,276
4	Edogawa	Special ward	697,932	681,298	678,967	653,944	619,953	589,414
5	Adachi	Special ward	695,043	670,122	683,426	624,807	617,123	622,270
6	Suginami	Special ward	591,108	563,997	549,569	528,587	522,103	515,803
7	Itabashi	Special ward	584,483	561,916	535,824	523,083	513,575	511,415
8	Hachiōji	City	579,605	577,513	580,053	560,012	536,046	503,363
9	Kōtō	Special ward	524,310	498,109	460,819	420,845	376,840	365,604
10	Katsushika	Special ward	453,093	442,913	442,586	424,878	421,519	424,478
11	Machida	City	431,525	432,348	427,016	405,544	377,494	360,522
12	Shinagawa	Special ward	422,488	386,855	365,302	346,357	324,608	325,377
13	Kita	Special ward	355,213	341,076	335,544	330,412	326,764	334,127
14	Shinjuku	Special ward	349,385	333,560	326,309	305,716	286,726	279,048
15	Nakano	Special ward	344,880	328,215	314,750	310,627	309,526	306,581
16	Toshima	Special ward	301,599	291,167	284,678	250,585	249,017	246,252
17	Meguro	Special ward	288,088	277,622	268,330	264,064	250,140	243,100
18	Sumida	Special ward	272,085	256,274	247,606	231,173	215,979	215,681
19	Fuchū	City	262,932	260,274	255,506	245,623	226,769	216,211
20	Minato	Special ward	260,486	243,283	205,131	185,861	144,885	
21	Shibuya	Special ward	243,883	224,533	204,492	203,334	196,682	188,472
22	Chōfu	City	242,721	229,061	223,593	216,119	204,759	198,574
23	Bunkyō	Special ward	240,069	219,724	206,626	189,632	176,017	172,474
24	Arakawa	Special ward	217,475	212,264	203,296	191,207	180,468	176,886
25	Taitō	Special ward	211,444	198,073	175,928	165,186	156,325	153,918
26	Nishitōkyō	City	207,389	200,012	196,511	189,735	180,885	175,073
27	Kodaira	City	198,977	190,005	187,035	183,796	178,623	172,946
28	Mitaka	City	195,558	186,936	186,083	177,016	171,612	165,721
29	Hino	City	190,261	186,283	180,052	176,538	167,942	166,537
30	Tachikawa	City	187,089	176,295	179,668	172,566	164,709	157,884
31	Chūō	Special ward	169,179	141,183	122,762	98,399	72,526	63,923
32	Higashimurayama	City	151,941	149,956	153,557	144,929	142,290	135,112
33	Musashino	City	150,102	144,730	138,734	137,525	135,746	135,051
34	Tama	City	147,169	146,631	147,648	145,877	145,862	148,113
35	Ōme	City	133,587	137,381	139,339	142,354	141,394	137,234
36	Kokubunji	City	129,353	122,742	120,650	117,604	111,404	105,786
37	Koganei	City	126,253	121,396	118,852	114,112	111,825	109,279
38	Higashikurume	City	115,227	116,632	116,546	115,330	113,302	111,097
39	Akishima	City	114,053	111,539	112,297	110,143	106,532	107,292
40	Inagi	City	93,171	85,157	83,068	79,353	77,212	76,355
41	Komae	City	84,807	80,249	78,751	78,319	75,711	74,656
42	Higashiyamato	City	83,952	85,157	83,068	79,353	77,212	76,355
43	Akiruno	City	79,366	80,954	80,868	79,587	78,351	75,355
44	Kunitachi	City	77,167	73,655	75,510	72,667	72,187	66,719
45	Kiyose	City	76,258	74,864	74,104	73,529	68,037	67,386
46	Musashimurayama	City	70,863	71,229	70,053	66,553	66,052	67,015
47	Chiyoda*	Special ward	66,680	58,406	47,115	41,778	36,035	34,780
48	Fussa	City	56,443	58,395	59,796	61,074	61,427	61,497
49	Hamura	City	54,341	55,833	57,032	56,514	56,013	55,095
50	Mizuho	Town	31,774	33,445	33,497	33,691	32,892	32,714
51	Hinode	Town	17,048	17,446	16,650	15,941	16,631	16,701
52	Okutama	Town	8,257	7,575	6,741	6,045	5,234	4,750
53	Ōshima	Town	7,104	7,884	8,461	8,702	9,224	9,693
54	Hachijō	Town	7,048	7,613	8,231	8,837	9,488	9,476
55	Ogasawara	Village	2,929	3,022	2,785	2,723	2,824	2,809
56	Niijima	Village	2,441	2,749	2,883	3,161	3,147	3,163
57	Miyake	Village	2,273	2,482	2,676	2,439	0 (Note: The population of Miyake was evacuated in 2000 due to volcanic eruptions. Inhabitants where allowed to return to the island in 2005.)	3,831
58	Hinohara	Village	2,003	2,209	2,558	2,930	3,256	3,560
59	Kōzushima	Village	1,855	1,891	1,889	2,068	2,144	2,276
60	Toshima	Village	327	337	341	308	N/A	N/A
61	Mikurajima	Village	323	335	348	292	308	275
62	Aogashima	Village	169	178	201	214	203	237

* Chiyoda is the political and legal centre of both the Tokyo Metropolis and Japan.
