= Hidekazu =

- Pronunciation: Hidekazu
- Gender: Male

Origin
- Origin: Japanese
- Region of origin: Japanese

Hidekazu (written: 秀和, 英和, 秀一 or 英一) is a masculine Japanese given name. Notable people with the name include:

- Hidekazu Hayashi (林 秀一; born 1965), Japanese rower
- Hidekazu Himaruya (日丸屋秀和; born 1985), Japanese manga artist
- Hidekazu Ichinose (市瀬 秀和; born 1975), Japanese voice actor
- Hidekazu Nagai (長井 秀和; born 1970), Japanese comedian
- Hidekazu Tanaka (田中 秀和; born 1987), Japanese composer and arranger
- Hidekazu Yokoyama (横山 秀和; born 1971), Japanese sport wrestler
- Hidekazu Yoshida (吉田 秀和; 1913–2012), Japanese music critic and literary critic
