= Kamata, Tokyo =

Neighborhood in Ōta-ku, Tokyo

Coordinates: 35°33′44.92″N 139°42′57.78″E

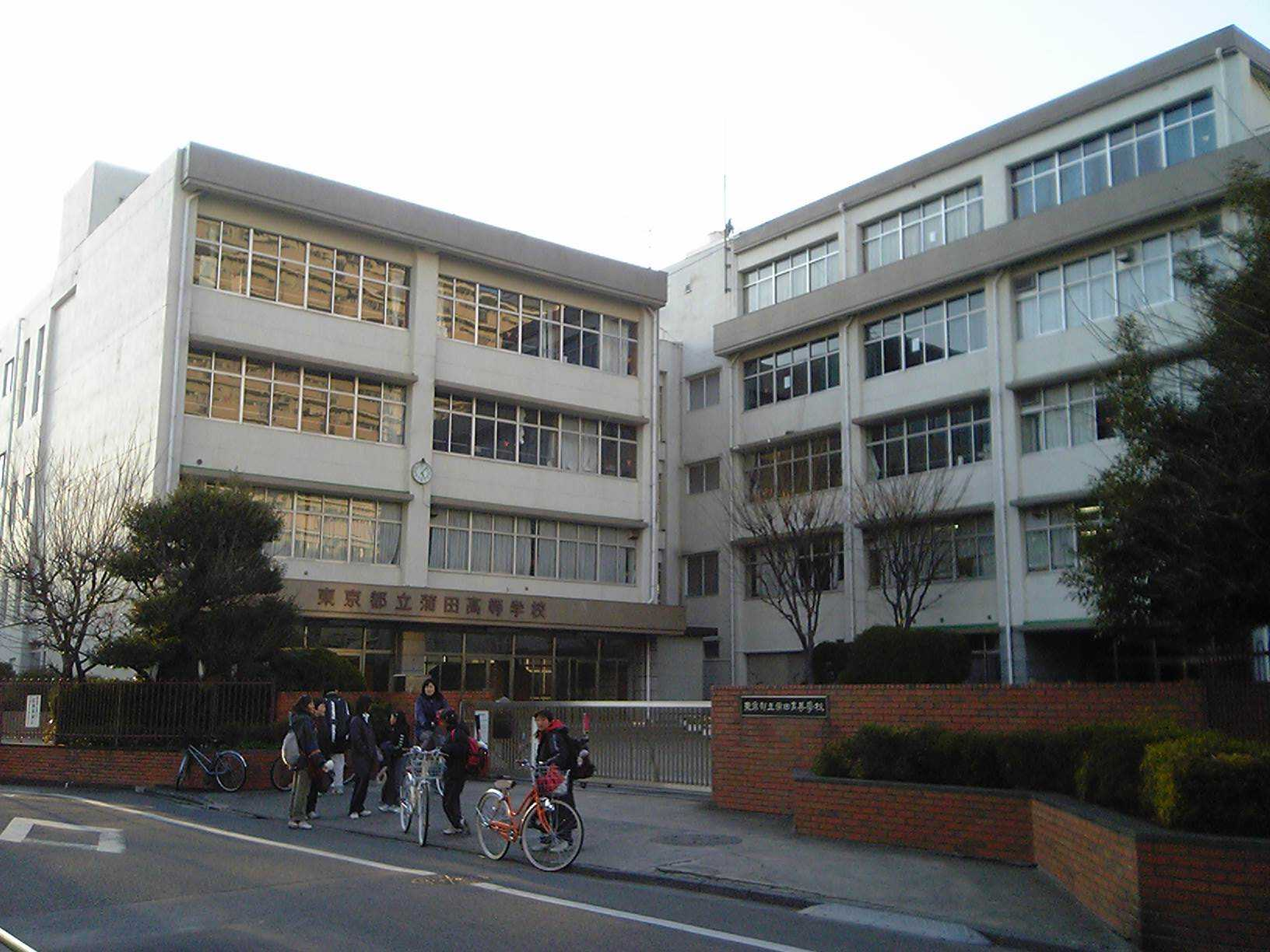
Kamata High School

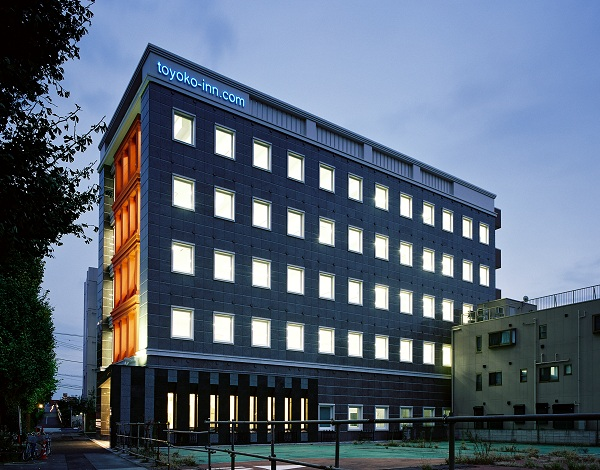
Toyoko Inn headquarters in Kamata

Kamata (蒲田) is a district of Ōta, Tokyo, Japan. Features include the Kamata Station, Kamata High School, and the headquarters of Toyoko Inn.

== History ==
The name "Kamata" has been used to refer to the area since at least the 900s AD. Historically, the area was famous for Japanese apricots (ume).

Kamata was first linked to nearby towns of Kawasaki, Kanagawa and Ōmori, Tokyo by rail in 1901 with the opening of Kamata Station (now Keikyu Kamata Station) on the Keihin Electric Railway. This was followed in 1904 by the opening of a separate Kamata Station on the Tokaido Line providing connection to Tokyo and Yokohama.

Kamata became a ward of Tokyo City in October 1932, incorporating the historical towns of Kamata, Yaguchi, Rokugo and Haneda. Kamata merged with the neighboring ward of Omori to form the ward (city) of Ota in March 1947.

== Education ==
Ota operates the public elementary and junior high schools in Kamata.

Kamata Elementary School (蒲田小学校) serves Kamata 1-3-chome and parts of 4 and 5-chome. Shinshuku Elementary School (新宿小学校) serves parts of 4 and 5-chome.

All of Kamata (1-5 chome) is zoned to Kamata Junior High School (蒲田中学校).

Tokyo Metropolitan Board of Education operates Kamata High School.
