= Tokyo Metropolitan Government Board of Education =

Government organization in Tokyo, Japan

The Tokyo Metropolitan Government Board of Education (東京都教育委員会 Tōkyō-to Kyōiku Iinkai) is the board of education in Tokyo, Japan. The board directly manages most of the public high schools in all 23 special wards, the Western Tokyo, and all islands under Tokyo's jurisdiction.

In 2019, policies requiring students who do not naturally have black hair to dye it as such were struck down. In 2017, as stated by survey results, 57% of the state-operated schools in the metropolis required students who did not have hair naturally colored black to submit documents proving so. The Japanese Communist Party criticized the so-called hair color code and measures requiring parents to prove hair color.

== The 23 Wards ==
=== Adachi ===
==== High schools ====
- Aoi High School
- Adachi High School
- Adachi East High School
- Adachi West High School
- Adachi Shinden High School
- Adachi Technical High School
- Arakawa Commercial High School
- Fuchie High School
- Kohoku High School

=== Arakawa ===
==== High schools ====
- Arakawa Technical High School
- Takenodai High School

=== Bunkyō ===
==== High schools ====
- Kogei High School
- Koishikawa High School
- Koishikawa Secondary Education School
- Mukogaoka High School
- Takehaya High School

=== Chiyoda ===
==== High schools ====
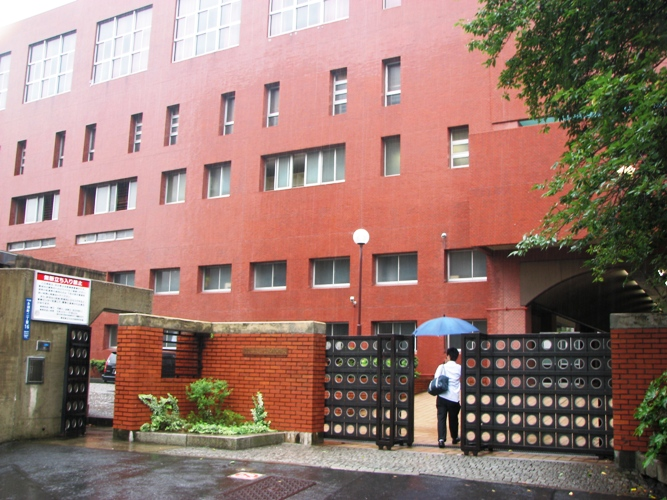
Hibiya High School

- Kudan Secondary Education School
- Hibiya High School
- Hitotsubashi High School

=== Chūō ===
==== High schools ====
- Harumi Sogo High School

=== Edogawa ===
==== High schools ====
- Edogawa High School
- Kasai Technical High School
- Kasai South High School
- Koiwa High School
- Komatsugawa High School
- Momijigawa High School
- Shinozaki High School

=== Itabashi ===
==== High schools ====
- Itabashi High School
- Itabashi Yutoku High School
- Kitatoshima Technical High School
- Kitazono High School
- Ohyama High School
- Takashima High School

=== Katsushika ===
==== High schools ====
- Katsushika Commercial High School
- Katsushika Sogo High School
- Katsushikano High School
- Honjo Technical High School
- South Katsushika High School
- Nousan High School

=== Kita ===
==== High schools ====
- Asuka High School
- Akabane Commercial High School
- Kirigaoka High School

=== Koto ===
==== High schools ====
- Daisan Commercial High School
- Fukagawa High School
- Higashi High School
- High School of Science and Technology
- Johtoh High School
- Koto Commercial High School
- Oedo High School
- Sumida Technical High School

=== Meguro ===
==== High schools ====
- Geijutsu High School
- International High School
- Komaba High School
- Meguro High School
- Ohsyukan Secondary Education School
- Tokyo Metropolitan University High School

=== Minato ===
==== High schools ====
- Mita High School
- Ota Sakuradai High School
- Roppongi High School
- Shiba Commercial High School

=== Nakano ===
==== High schools ====
- Fuji High School
- Minorigaoka High School
- Musashigaoka High School
- Nakano Technical High School
- Saginomiya High School
- Yotsuya Commercial High School

=== Nerima ===
==== High schools ====
- Fourth Commercial High School
- Hikarigaoka High School
- Igusa High School
- Nerima High School
- Nerima Technical High School
- Oizumi High School
- Oizumi Sakura High School
- Shakujii High School
- Tagara High School

=== Ōta ===
==== High schools ====
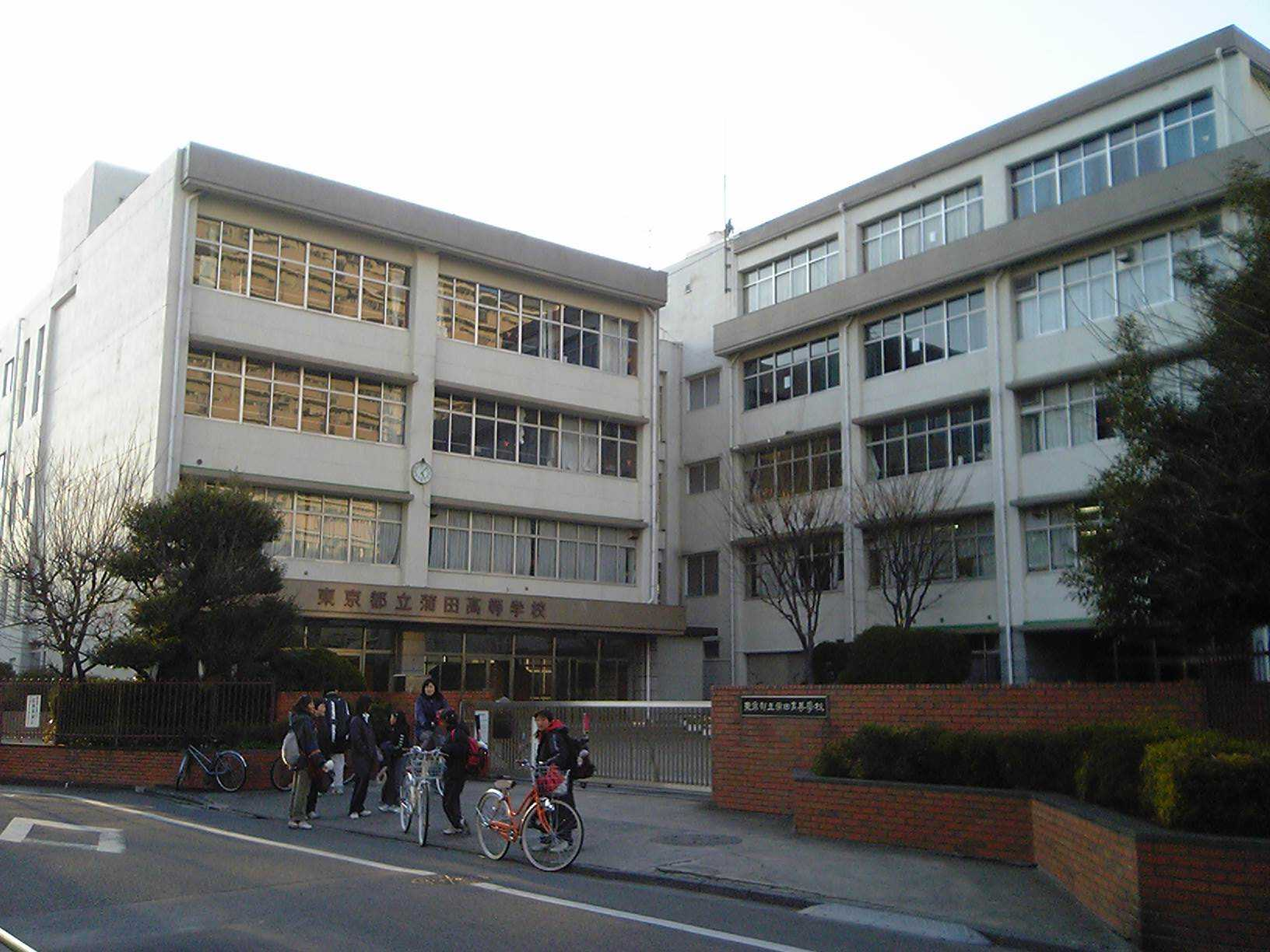
Kamata High School

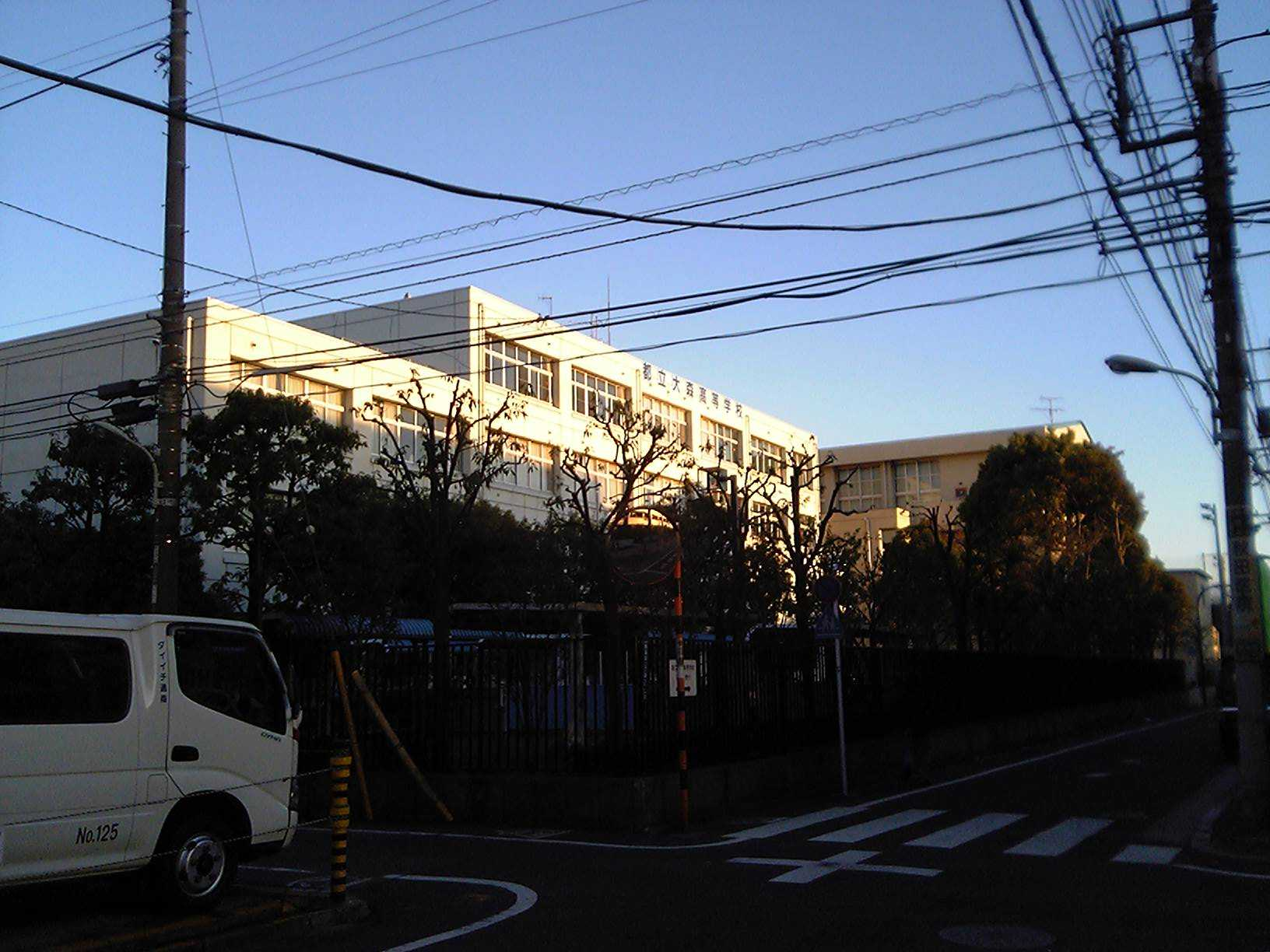
Ōmori High School

- Den-en Chofu High School
- Kamata High School
- Mihara High School
- Omori High School
- Rokugoh Technical High School
- Tsubasa Sogo High School
- Yukigaya High School

=== Setagaya ===
==== High schools ====
- Chitosegaoka High School
- Engei High School
- Fukasawa High School
- Matsubara High School
- Roka High School
- Sakuramachi High School
- Setagaya Izumi High School
- Setagaya Sogo High School
- Sogo Technical High School

=== Shibuya ===
==== High schools ====
- Aoyama High School
- First Commercial High School
- Hiroo High School

=== Shinagawa ===
==== High schools ====
- Koyamadai High School
- Osaki High School
- Yashio High School

=== Shinjuku ===
==== High schools ====
- Shinjuku High School
- Shinjuku Yamabuki High School
- Toyama High School

=== Suginami ===
==== High schools ====
- Nishi High School
- Nogei High School
- Ogikubo High School
- Suginami High School
- Suginami Sogo High School
- Suginami Technical High School
- Toyotama High School

=== Sumida ===
==== junior high schools ====
- Ryogoku Junior High School

==== High schools ====
- Honjo High School
- Mukojima Commercial High School
- Mukojima Technical High School
- Nihonbashi High School
- Ryogoku High School
- Sumidagawa High School
- Tachibana High School

=== Taitō ===
==== junior high schools ====
- Hakuo Junior High School

==== High schools ====
- Asakusa High School
- Hakuo High School
- Kuramae Technical High School
- Shinobugaoka High School
- Ueno High School

=== Toshima ===
==== High schools ====
- Bunkyo High School
- Chihaya High School
- Toshima High School

== Western Tokyo (incorporated cities) ==
=== Akiruno ===
==== High schools ====
- Akirudai High School
- Itsukaichi High School

=== Akishima ===
==== High schools ====
- Haijima High School
- Showa High School

=== Chōfu ===
==== High schools ====
- Chofu North High School
- Chofu South High School
- Jindai High School

=== Fuchū ===
==== High schools ====
- Fuchu High School
- Fuchu East High School
- Fuchu West High School
- Fuchu Technical High School
- Nogyo High School

=== Fussa ===
==== High schools ====
- Fussa High School
- Tama Technical High School

=== Hachiōji ===
==== High schools ====
- Fujimori High School
- Hachioji East High School
- Hachioji North High School
- Hachioji Takushin High School
- Hachioji Technical High School
- Katakura High School
- Matsugaya High School
- Minamitama High School
- Second Commercial High School
- Shoyo High School

=== Hamura ===
==== High schools ====
- Hamura High School

=== Higashikurume ===
==== High schools ====
- Kurume High School
- Kurume West High School
- Higashikurume Sogo High School

=== Higashimurayama ===
==== High schools ====
- Higashimurayama High School
- Higashimurayama West High School

=== Higashiyamato ===
==== High schools ====
- Higashiyamato High School
- Higashiyamato South High School

=== Hino ===
==== High schools ====
- Hino High School
- Hinodai High School
- Minamidaira High School

=== Inagi ===
==== High schools ====
- Wakaba Sogo High School

=== Kiyose ===
==== High schools ====
- Kiyose High School

=== Kodaira ===
==== High schools ====
- Kodaira High School
- Kodaira South High School
- Kodaira West High School

=== Koganei ===
==== High schools ====
- Koganei North High School
- Koganei Technical High School

=== Kokubunji ===
==== High schools ====
- Kokubunji High School

=== Komae ===
==== High schools ====
- Komae High School

=== Kunitachi ===
==== High schools ====
- Kunitachi High School
- Fifth Commercial High School

=== Machida ===
==== High schools ====
- Machida High School
- Machida Technical High School
- Naruse High School
- Nozuta High School
- Ogawa High School
- Yamasaki High School

=== Mitaka ===
==== High schools ====
- Mitaka High School

=== Mushashimurayama ===
==== High schools ====
- Josui High School
- Mushashimurayama High School

=== Musashino ===
==== junior high schools ====
- Musashi Junior High School

==== High schools ====
- Musashi High School
- Musashino North High School

=== Nishitōkyō ===
==== High schools ====
- Hoya High School
- Tanashi High School
- Tanashi High School of Technology

=== Ōme ===
==== High schools ====
- Ome Sogo High School
- Tama High School

=== Tachikawa ===
==== High schools ====
- Kitatama High School
- Sunagawa High School
- Tachikawa High School
- Tachikawa International Secondary Education School

=== Tama ===
==== High schools ====
- Nagayama High School

=== Nishitama District ===
==== High schools ====
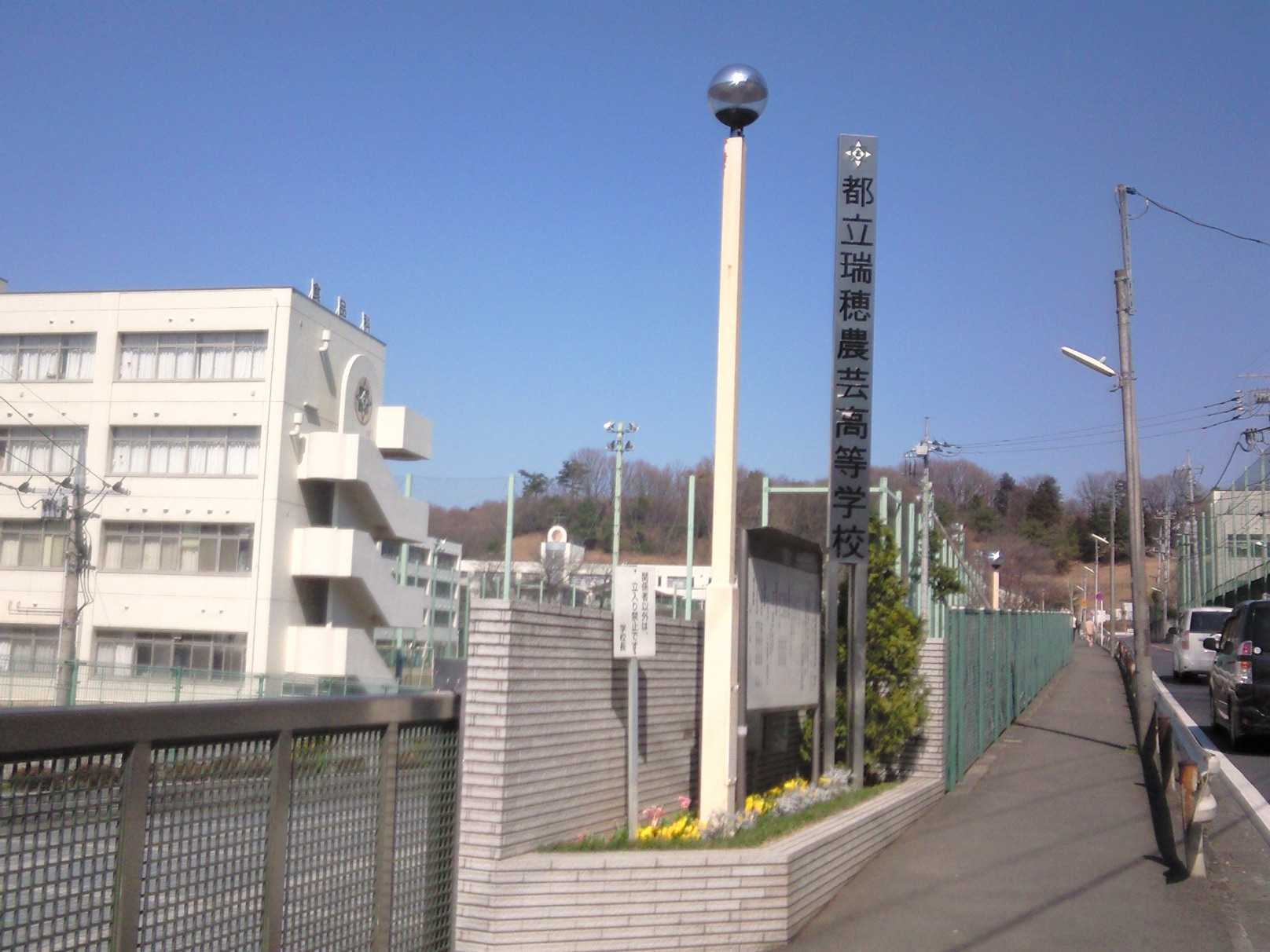
Mizuho Nōgei High School

- Mizuho Nōgei High School (Mizuho)

== Tokyo-Administered Islands ==
=== Hachijō ===
==== High schools ====
- Hachijō High School

=== Kōzu-shima ===
==== High schools ====
- Kozu High School

=== Miyakejima ===
==== High schools ====
- Miyake High School

=== Niijima ===
==== High schools ====
- Niijima High School

=== Ogasawara ===
==== High schools ====
- Chichijima
  - Ogasawara High School

=== Izu Ōshima ===
==== High schools ====
- Oshima High School
- Oshima Kaiyo-kokusai High School

== Specialized schools ==
=== Technical schools ===
==== 23 special wards ====
- Arakawa
  - Tokyo Metropolitan College of Aeronautical Engineering EN, JP
- Shinagawa
  - Tokyo Metropolitan College of Technology
  - Tokyo Metropolitan College of Industrial Technology

=== Schools for the blind ===
==== 23 special wards ====
- Bunkyō
  - Bunkyo School for the Blind
- Katsushika
  - Katsushika School for the Blind
- Setagaya
  - Kugayama School for the Blind

==== Western Tokyo (incorporated cities) ====
- Hachiōji
  - Hachiōji School for the Blind

=== Schools for the deaf ===
==== 23 special wards ====
- Central School for the Deaf (2 locations) - Shakuji Campus (石神井校舎) in Nerima and Otsuka Campus (大塚校舎) in Toshima

== See also ==
- Secondary education in Japan
