= Consolidated city-county =

U.S. local jurisdiction comprising a merged city and county

In United States local government, a consolidated city-county is formed when one or more cities and their surrounding county (parish in Louisiana, borough in Alaska) merge into one unified jurisdiction. As such, it is a type of unitary authority that has the governmental powers of both a municipal corporation and a county.

A consolidated city-county is different from an independent city, although the latter may result from consolidation of a city and a county and may also have the same powers as a consolidated city-county. An independent city is a city not deemed by its state to be located within the boundary of any county and considered a primary administrative division of its state. A consolidated city-county differs from an independent city in that the city and county both nominally exist, although they have a consolidated government, whereas in an independent city, the county does not even nominally exist. Furthermore, a consolidated city-county may still contain independent municipalities maintaining some governmental powers that did not merge with the rest of the county.

Not considering Hawaii, which has no independent municipalities, the Midwest and Upper South have the highest concentration of large consolidated city-county governments in the United States, including Indianapolis, Indiana; Nashville, Tennessee; Louisville, Kentucky; Kansas City, Kansas; and Lexington, Kentucky. The largest consolidated city-county in the United States by population is Philadelphia, Pennsylvania, while the largest by land area is Sitka, Alaska.

== Terminology ==
The term consolidated city-county refers to a consolidated jurisdiction in a state that is otherwise divided into counties. In Louisiana, which is divided into parishes, the equivalent jurisdiction is known as either a city-parish or a consolidated government, depending on the locality. In Alaska, it is known as a unified municipality, unified home rule borough, or city and borough. The United States Census Bureau generically refers to any such jurisdiction as a consolidated city, regardless of the jurisdiction into with the city has consolidated. Although California is divided into counties, a consolidated city-county is officially termed a city and county.

== Overview ==
Consolidated city-counties are typically formed to address particular government challenges. Among the benefits of having a unified jurisdiction include potential cost savings, more efficiency, increased legal powers and revenue sources, and a more streamlined planning system.

Most consolidated city-counties have a single chief executive who acts as both the city mayor and as the head of the county government, and a multi-district elected body that serves as both the city council and as the county legislative body.

In many states, consolidated city-counties must be approved by voters. According to information compiled by former Albuquerque mayor David Rusk, 105 referendums were held in the United States between 1902 and 2010 to consider proposals to consolidate cities and counties. Only 27 of these proposals were approved by voters.

Wyandotte County, Kansas, uses the term "unified government" to refer to its consolidation with Kansas City, Kansas, and most of the towns within the county boundaries remain separate jurisdictions within the county. Individual sections of a metropolitan or regional municipality may retain some autonomous jurisdiction apart from the citywide government.

Often, in place of another level of government, local governments form councils of governments—essentially governmental organizations which are not empowered with any law-making or law enforcement powers. This is the case in the Atlanta metropolitan area, where the Atlanta Regional Commission (ARC) studies and makes recommendations on the impact of all major construction and development projects on the region, but generally cannot stop them. The Georgia Regional Transportation Authority (GRTA) is a true government agency of the state of Georgia, and does control some state transportation funding to the cities and counties, but otherwise has very little authority beyond this small power of the purse.

In California, a city and county's chartered city powers supersede its chartered county powers. However, because the city and county has territorial jurisdiction exclusive of other counties, it also has county officers, and the state counts it as a county for certain purposes.

Despite being consolidated with New Orleans, Orleans Parish retains a nominal, sui generis status under Louisiana state law that guarantees the city's home rule. It has been effectively abolished as a distinct governmental unit. However, various parish offices remain with a degree of independence from the city government, while in other matters, the city represents the parish.

The case of New York City is unique, in that the city consists of five boroughs, each of which is co-extensive with a county. Each has its own district attorney; however, county-level government is essentially non-existent as all executive and legislative power is exercised by the city government throughout the five boroughs. The city, as currently constituted, was created in 1898 when the city of New York (then comprising what would become the boroughs of Manhattan and The Bronx) annexed Kings County, Queens County, and Richmond County as the boroughs of Brooklyn, Queens, and Staten Island, respectively.

=== International equivalents ===
Similar unitary authority arrangements also exist in other countries.

==== United Kingdom ====
Modern unitary authorities are similar, and are known as county boroughs in Wales. In Scotland, Aberdeen, Dundee, Edinburgh and Glasgow are functionally "independent cities", though the term is not used.

==== Europe ====
In Germany, Berlin and Hamburg are both cities and states (the state of Bremen consists of the cities of Bremen and Bremerhaven). Nearly every larger city in Germany is an independent city, like Frankfurt, Stuttgart, Munich or Dresden; Austria, where the capital of Vienna is both a city and state; France, where the capital city of Paris has been coterminous with the département of Paris since 1968.

==== Russia ====
In Russia, there are urban districts - territories consisting of a city and nearby settlements united by one mayor's office. As a rule, urban districts are the capitals of the constituent entities of Russia and other major cities in the region. In 2020, there were 635 urban districts.

==== Canada ====
The Canadian province of Ontario contains several single-tier municipalities. They can be similar to American consolidated city-counties in that they are often formed by amalgamating an upper-tier municipality. However, they are functionally independent cities as, unlike a consolidated city-county, the county or region ceases to exist after being amalgamated and does not continue on a nominal basis, leaving only the unified single-tier city. One example is the City of Toronto, created in 1998 from the amalgamation of the central government and the six constituent municipalities of the Municipality of Metropolitan Toronto (a type of regional municipality), itself originally created in 1954.

The Northern Rockies Regional Municipality in British Columbia is also a single-tier municipality, functioning as both a regional district and a district municipality. It was formed in 2009 by amalgamating the former Northern Rockies Regional District.

==== Japan ====
In 1943, the City of Tokyo was amalgamated with the former Tokyo Prefecture to form the Tokyo Metropolis. The present form of Tokyo functions similarly to a prefecture, having a central government along with several autonomous subdivisions. The original Tokyo City was split into 23 "special wards" which effectively function as cities. In addition, there are also 23 cities, 5 towns and 8 villages within Tokyo. Under this structure, Tokyo does not have a single mayor, but rather a governor and numerous local mayors. Further, some responsibilities that would normally be held by the cities are instead held by the metropolitan government. Currently, Tokyo is the only place designated as a metropolis.

==== South Korea ====
Seoul is a special city, while six other cities (Busan, Daegu, Daejeon, Gwangju, Incheon, and Ulsan) are metropolitan cities.

==== Australia ====
Municipalities in Australia, or "Local Government Areas" (LGAs) as they are officially known, are all single-tier entities with no government in-between them and the state or territory. However, the Australian Capital Territory (ACT) does not have any LGAs. Instead, the territorial government performs all municipal functions of the city of Canberra, and thus functions as an integrated city-territory.

== Balances ==
In nine consolidated city-county governments in the United States, the formerly independent incorporated places maintain some governmental powers. In these cities, which the United States Census Bureau calls "consolidated cities", statistics are recorded both for the entire consolidated government and for the component municipalities. A part of the consolidated government is called the "balance", which the Census Bureau defines as "the consolidated city minus the semi-independent incorporated places located within the consolidated city".

In Georgia, consolidations often required multiple attempts, changes in procedures, and different local laws in the state legislature. They often did not include some smaller jurisdictions. They also retained characteristics of both types of government, e.g., a sheriff as required by the Georgia Constitution.

These consolidated cities are:

- Athens–Clarke County, Georgia
- Augusta–Richmond County, Georgia
- Butte–Silver Bow County, Montana
- Indianapolis–Marion County, Indiana
- Jacksonville–Duval County, Florida
- Kansas City, Kansas–Wyandotte County, Kansas
- Louisville–Jefferson County, Kentucky
- Macon-Bibb County, Georgia
- Nashville–Davidson County, Tennessee

== List of consolidated city-counties ==
=== Consolidated as a single entity ===
The following consolidated city-counties are considered single entities encompassing both a city and a county, such as "City and County of San Francisco".

- Alaska
  - Municipality of Anchorage: City and Borough are consolidated forming a unified government.
  - City and Borough of Juneau
  - City and Borough of Sitka
  - Municipality and Borough of Skagway
  - City and Borough of Wrangell
  - City and Borough of Yakutat
- California
  - City and County of San Francisco: The City of San Francisco was the seat of San Francisco County until 1856, when the county was split into the consolidated City and County of San Francisco in the north, with the remainder of old San Francisco County becoming the new County of San Mateo.
- Colorado
  - City and County of Broomfield: Town of Broomfield incorporated June 1, 1961. Consolidated City and County of Broomfield created November 15, 2001, from the incorporated City of Broomfield in portions of Boulder, Adams, Jefferson, and Weld Counties.
  - City and County of Denver: Denver City, Colorado Territory, incorporated November 7, 1861. Denver served as the Arapahoe County seat until November 15, 1902, when Arapahoe County was split into the new Adams County and the renamed South Arapahoe County. Denver was split from the two new counties on December 1, 1902.
- Hawaii
  - City and County of Honolulu
- Massachusetts
  - Town and County of Nantucket: one and the same since it was separated from Dukes County, New York, to join the colony of Massachusetts. In New England a town serves the same municipal functions as a city. Contrary to city–county consolidation, eight of Massachusetts' 14 county governments have been abolished.

=== Merged ===
The following consolidated city-counties merged a previously existing city and county and are still considered two separate entities, both a city and a county, even though the government functions have been consolidated.

==== With no independent municipalities ====
- Alaska
  - Haines and Haines Borough
- Georgia
  - Columbus and Muscogee County
  - Cusseta and Chattahoochee County
  - Georgetown and Quitman County
  - Macon (and Payne) with Bibb County
  - Preston and Webster County
  - Statenville and Echols County
- Kentucky
  - Lexington and Fayette County
- Louisiana
  - Houma and Terrebonne Parish (Despite the consolidated city-parish government, Houma is not coterminous with Terrebonne Parish; Houma remains a geographically distinct municipality within the parish.)
  - New Orleans and Orleans Parish
- Montana
  - Anaconda and Deer Lodge County
- New Mexico
  - Los Alamos and Los Alamos County – The town of Los Alamos consolidated with county of the same name in 1969.
- Pennsylvania
  - Philadelphia and Philadelphia County – Their borders have been conterminous since 1854 Act of Consolidation, and the government structures were consolidated in 1952. The county still exists as a separate entity within Pennsylvania, but the functions of the county are generally administered by the city.
- Tennessee
  - Hartsville and Trousdale County
  - Lynchburg and Moore County

==== With other independent municipalities ====
- Alaska
  - Petersburg Borough (When the borough was created in 2013, the city of Petersburg was dissolved. However, the city of Kupreanof remains a separate entity within the borough.)
- Florida
  - Jacksonville and Duval County (four incorporated places within Duval County – the cities of Jacksonville Beach, Neptune Beach, Atlantic Beach, and the town of Baldwin – retain separate governments; all other rural land is incorporated by Jacksonville and so the entire county is incorporated)
- Georgia
  - Athens and Clarke County (the cities of Winterville, which is entirely within Clarke County, and Bogart, which is partially within the county, retain separate governments)
  - Augusta and Richmond County (two communities within Richmond County retain separate governments)
- Indiana
  - Indianapolis and Marion County (four communities within Marion County retain separate governments)
- Kansas
  - Kansas City and Wyandotte County (this "Unified Government" contains Kansas City, Edwardsville, most of Bonner Springs, and roughly half of Lake Quivira; a county relationship is maintained with the rest of the communities within the county) as of 1997.
  - Tribune and Greeley County (Horace retaining a separate government)
- Kentucky
  - Louisville and Jefferson County (all cities in pre-merger Jefferson County, other than Louisville, retain separate identities and some governmental functions, but all participate fully in the county-wide governing body, Louisville Metro Council)
- Louisiana
  - Baton Rouge and East Baton Rouge Parish (four cities within East Baton Rouge Parish – Baker, Central, St. George, and Zachary – retain separate governments. In addition, the City of Baton Rouge retains separate city limits, and its official census population only includes this area)
  - Lafayette and Lafayette Parish (In December 2018 voters amended the city-parish charter to split what was a single consolidated city-parish council into two councils — one to represent only the city of Lafayette and the other to represent the parish. The impetus for the change was the desire of city voters to take more control of city-related matters and general unease with the consequences of consolidation).
- Montana
  - Butte and Silver Bow County (the town of Walkerville)
- North Carolina
  - Camden and Camden County (a census-designated place within a county with no incorporated municipalities apart from a small portion of Elizabeth City, re-organizing into a single unified government)
- Tennessee
  - Nashville and Davidson County (six communities within Davidson County retain separate governments, although all participate in the metropolitan government in a two-tier system)

=== Special cases ===
- New York City consists of five boroughs, each of which is co-extensive with a county of New York State. This amalgamation was created in 1898 when the existing cities and communities within those counties were merged within one municipal government.
  - Borough of Manhattan and New York County
  - Borough of the Bronx and Bronx County
  - Borough of Brooklyn and Kings County
  - Borough of Staten Island and Richmond County
  - Borough of Queens and Queens County
- Washington, D.C. – While the District of Columbia is a federal district and not a county, the city has had a consolidated municipal government since 1871. Prior to then, Washington, Georgetown, and the unincorporated County of Washington were separate jurisdictions within the District of Columbia. Prior to 1846, when it was retroceded to Virginia, the south bank of the District of Columbia was the County of Alexandria (now the independent City of Alexandria and the County of Arlington).

== Formerly consolidated ==
- The City of Boston and Suffolk County, Massachusetts, operated with a consolidated government for most of the twentieth century with Boston providing office space, auditors, budget, personnel and financial oversight for Suffolk County. This was not a true consolidation because three municipalities – Chelsea, Revere and Winthrop – were never annexed into Boston and remained separate jurisdictions within Suffolk County; however, the City of Boston held complete control of the county by law. The special relationship between Boston and Suffolk County ended in 1999 as part of the gradual abolition of county governments through much of the state with all county employees and powers transferred to Commonwealth of Massachusetts control. The only remaining powers and duties for the City of Boston in regards to the county is ceremonial in which the Suffolk County Register of Deeds is issued the oath of office at the start of a term as well as calls for a meeting to hold a special election to fill the office should there be a failure to elect someone to the office or should a vacancy occur.
- From the 17th century to 1898, New York City was coterminous with New York County and was often referred to as the "City and County of New York". Both were coterminous with Manhattan until 1874, when the city and county annexed parts of Westchester County that would become the West Bronx, later annexing the remainder of the future Bronx. Upon consolidation in 1898, New York County was coterminous and consolidated with the boroughs of the Bronx and Manhattan, while the other boroughs were consolidated with their own respective counties. The Bronx was separated from New York County in 1914 to form its own Bronx County, and since then, each of the five boroughs of New York City is coterminous and consolidated with a county of New York state.

=== Initially consolidated to form independent cities ===
The following independent cities were initially formed from a consolidation of a city and a county, and then the county ceased to exist even in name.

- Carson City was consolidated with Ormsby County, Nevada, in 1969, but the county was simultaneously dissolved. The city is now a municipality independent of any county.
- Virginia – Five cities in the Hampton Roads region were formed by the consolidation of a city with a county: Chesapeake, Hampton, Newport News, Suffolk, and Virginia Beach (from Norfolk, Elizabeth City, Warwick, Nansemond, and Princess Anne counties, respectively). However, in each case an independent city was created, with the Code of Virginia using the term "consolidated city" instead.

== Potentially consolidated ==
- Aurora, Colorado, split among three counties, explored the creation of a new consolidated city-county in 1996; the effort subsequently failed in a referendum. However, five years later, nearby Broomfield was successful in creating a new city-county from portions of the four counties it had been a part of. Encouraged by Broomfield's experience, an Aurora city councilman again proposed consolidation in 2006. This was not accomplished in 2006 or 2007, and no bills to accomplish consolidation were introduced in the 2008 session of the Colorado legislature.
- In 2006, a proposal was made to merge Johnson County and Wyandotte County in Kansas and the cities located in those two counties into a single consolidated city-county, with the name to be determined.
- In 2005, The Plain Dealer in Cleveland, Ohio, published a series of articles exploring the possibility of the city's merging with Cuyahoga County.
- Miami-Dade County, Florida, operates under a federated two-tier government, in which the county government operates as a superseding entity of county affairs and lower-tier incorporated municipalities operate civil and community services at the city level. However, the county provides city-level police, fire-rescue, sanitation, and other services under contract to many of the municipalities within its borders.
- The independent City of St. Louis, Missouri, and that of St. Louis County. The city of St. Louis seceded from the county in the 1870s and is not part of any county in the state of Missouri. Regional leaders have proposed several plans since 2006 to reunify the city and county, each one rejected by voters.

=== Considered consolidation ===
- Albuquerque and Bernalillo County, New Mexico (1959, 2003)
- Baltimore and Baltimore County, Maryland: Baltimore is established in the Constitution of Maryland as an independent city. A proposed constitutional amendment to dissolve the city and merge it into Baltimore County was introduced in 1999 but was withdrawn less than a month after the first reading. Consolidation of the city and county was later proposed in 2019.
- Birmingham and Jefferson County, Alabama (1948)
- Brunswick and Glynn County, Georgia (1969, 1987)
- Buffalo and Erie County, New York
- Charleston/North Charleston/Mount Pleasant and Charleston County, South Carolina (1974)
- Charlotte and Mecklenburg County, North Carolina (1971)
- Chattanooga and Hamilton County, Tennessee (1964)
- Des Moines and Polk County, Iowa (1994, 2004)
- Durham and Durham County, North Carolina (1961, 1974)
- El Paso and El Paso County, Texas (legislation introduced in 2005 and never considered in committee)
- Evansville and Vanderburgh County, Indiana
  - Voted four times on consolidation—in 1959, 1974, 2002, and 2012. The most recent vote saw consolidation defeated by a nearly 2-to-1 margin.
- Fairbanks and Fairbanks North Star Borough, Alaska (2001)
- Fayetteville and Lincoln County, Tennessee (2008)
- Fort Wayne and Allen County, Indiana
- Frankfort and Franklin County, Kentucky
- Gainesville and Alachua County, Florida (1990)
- Knoxville and Knox County, Tennessee (1959, 1978, 1996)
- Las Vegas and Clark County, Nevada
- Little Rock and Pulaski County, Arkansas
- Memphis and Shelby County, Tennessee (1962, 1971, 2010)
- Muncie and Delaware County, Indiana
- Oakland and Alameda County, California (1921)
- Omaha and Douglas County, Nebraska (2006, 2011)
  - Movements to consolidate these two jurisdictions have been popping up since the decade of the 1900s. The 2006 proposal was approved by the Douglas County Board of Commissioners, but unanimously rejected by the Omaha City Council. The 2011 proposal was introduced by a state legislator in The Unicameral, as LB344; it was tabled in committee.
- Owensboro, Kentucky, and Daviess County, Kentucky (1990)
- Orlando and Orange County, Florida
- Paducah and McCracken County, Kentucky
  - Rejected a proposed consolidation in 2012 by a more than 2-to-1 margin.
- Pensacola and Escambia County, Florida (1970)
- Pittsburgh and Allegheny County, Pennsylvania
  - Referendums passed in 1925, 1929 and 1939 that were blocked on technicalities by the state assembly. A partial consolidation of area school districts in 1956.
- Portland and Multnomah County, Oregon (1927, 1974)
- Richmond (independent city) with Henrico County, Virginia (1961), although the result would be an expanded independent city of Richmond rather than a consolidated city-county.
- Roanoke County, Virginia, and the City of Roanoke, although the result would be an expanded independent city of Roanoke rather than a consolidated city-county
  - held referendums in 1969 and 1990 to consolidate the two governments. Both times, city voters approved consolidation while county voters were opposed. The independent city of Salem, Virginia, which would have been surrounded by the consolidated entity, did not participate in the referendums. Vinton, Virginia, would have retained its status as a town in the 1990 referendum. The consolidation issue has been dormant since 1990.
- Sacramento and Sacramento County, California (1974, 1990)
- Savannah and Chatham County, Georgia
  - Prior consolidation referendum held in 1973 failed. The Georgia General Assembly is conducting a feasibility study towards consolidating the city of Savannah with Chatham County.
- St. Louis (independent city) with St. Louis County, Missouri (1926, 1962, In consideration in 2017) In 2019, a proposal to merge the city and the county was put together by a group called Better Together with support from both the County executive and mayor at the time, but the proposal was withdrawn after the St. Louis County executive Steve Stenger, who would have become mayor of a consolidated St. Louis had the consolidation happened, was indicted and pled guilty to federal corruption charges.
- Sioux Falls and Minnehaha/Lincoln counties, South Dakota (2005)
- Spokane and Spokane County, Washington (1995)
- Tallahassee and Leon County, Florida (1971, 1973, 1976, 1992)
- Tampa and Hillsborough County, Florida (1967, 1970, 1972)
- Toledo and Lucas County, Ohio
- Topeka and Shawnee County, Kansas (2005)
- Wilmington and New Hanover County, North Carolina (1933)

== See also ==
- Combined Statistical Area
- Conurbation
- City with powiat rights
- City of regional significance
- City-state
- Direct-controlled municipality
- Ekistics
- Independent city (United States)
- Megalopolis (term)
- Megacity
- Merger (politics)
- Metropolitan area
- Metropolis
- Urban secession

== Bibliography ==
- Richardson, Richard J. (1961). Orleans Parish Offices: Notes on a City-Parish Consolidation. Edgar B. Stern Memorial Honors Fellowship Series. Vol. 1. New Orleans: Bureau of Governmental Research – via HathiTrust.
