= Fussa Station =

Railway station in Fussa, Tokyo, Japan

JC57 Fussa Station 福生駅
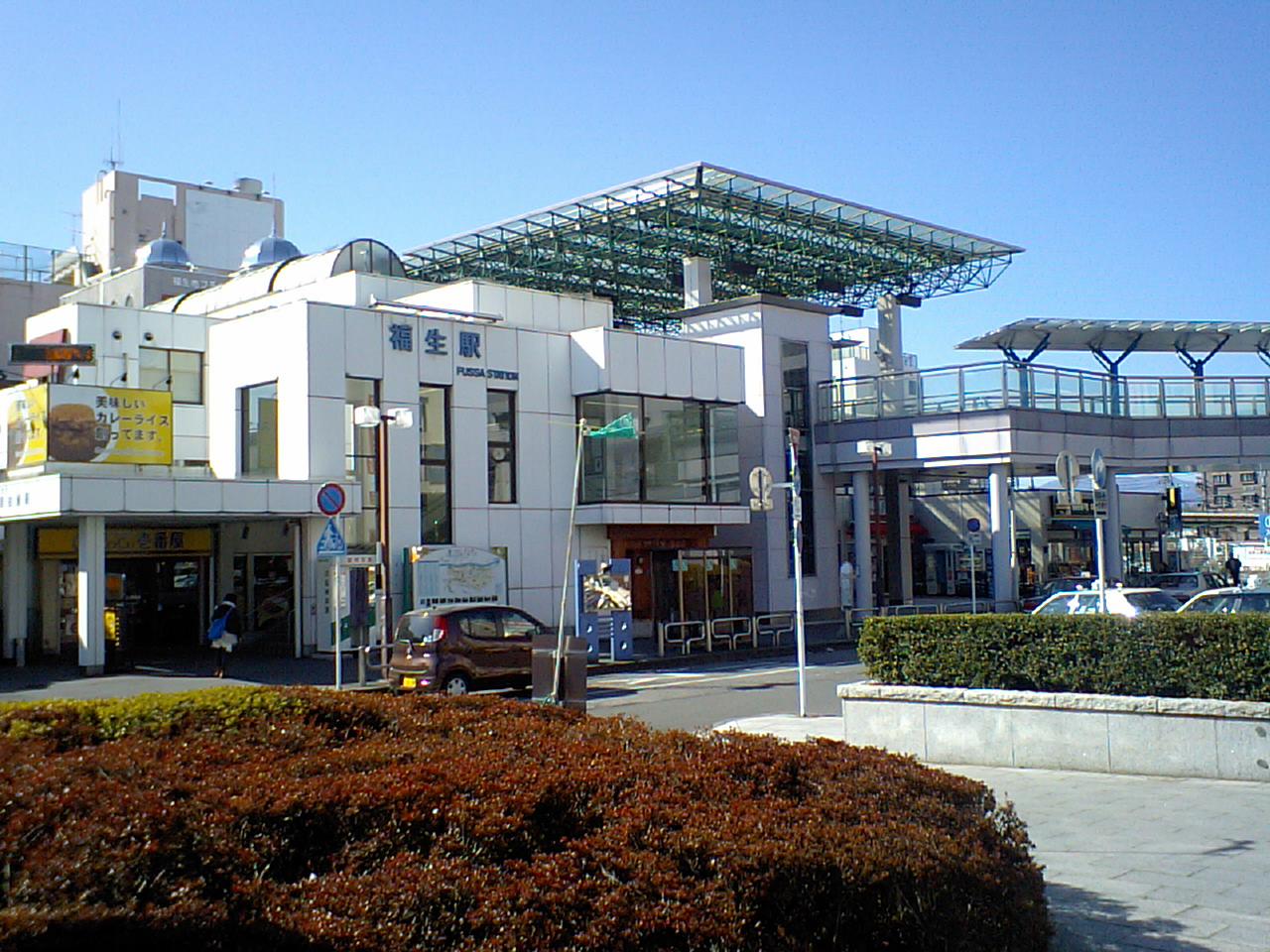
- Fussa Station in May 2016

General information
- Location: 137 Honcho, Fussa-shi, Tokyo 197-0011; Japan
- Coordinates: 35.7424°N 139.3275°E
- Operator: JR East
- Line: Ōme Line
- Distance: 9.6 from Tachikawa
- Platforms: 1 island platform
- Tracks: 2

Other information
- Status: Staffed
- Website: Official website

History
- Opened: 19 November 1894

Passengers
- FY2019: 16,017

Services
| Preceding station | JR East | Following station |
|---|---|---|
| Hamura One-way operation | Ōme Line Commuter Special Rapid | Ushihama JC56 towards Tachikawa |
| Hamura JC58 towards Ōme | Ōme Line Ōme Special Rapid | Ushihama JC56 towards Tachikawa |
| Hamura JC58 towards Ōme | Ōme Line Commuter Rapid | Ushihama One-way operation |
| Hamura JC58 towards Oku-Tama | Ōme Line Rapid Local | Ushihama JC56 towards Tachikawa |
Location
- Location within Tokyo Location within Japan

Fussa Station (福生駅, Fussa-eki) is a passenger railway station located in the city of Fussa, Tokyo, Japan, operated by East Japan Railway Company (JR East).

== Lines ==
Fussa Station is served by the Ōme Line, and is located 9.6 kilometers (5.97 miles) from the starting point of the line at Tachikawa Station.

== Station layout ==
This station consists of a single island platform serving two tracks. The station is staffed.

=== Platforms ===
| 1 | Ōme Line | for Ōme and Okutama |
| 2 | Ōme Line | for Tachikawa, Shinjuku, and Tokyo |

== History ==
The station opened on 19 November 1894. With the privatization of Japanese National Railways (JNR) on 1 April 1987, the station came under the control of JR East.

== Passenger statistics ==
In fiscal 2019, the station was used by an average of 16,017 passengers daily (boarding passengers only).

The passenger figures for previous years are as shown below.

| Fiscal year | Daily average |
|---|---|
| 2005 | 16,808 |
| 2010 | 16,208 |
| 2015 | 16,639 |

== Surrounding area ==
- Fussa City Hall
- Yokota Air Base
- Seiyu Mall

== See also ==
- List of railway stations in Japan
