= Ushihama Station =

Railway station in Fussa, Tokyo, Japan

JC56 Ushihama Station 牛浜駅
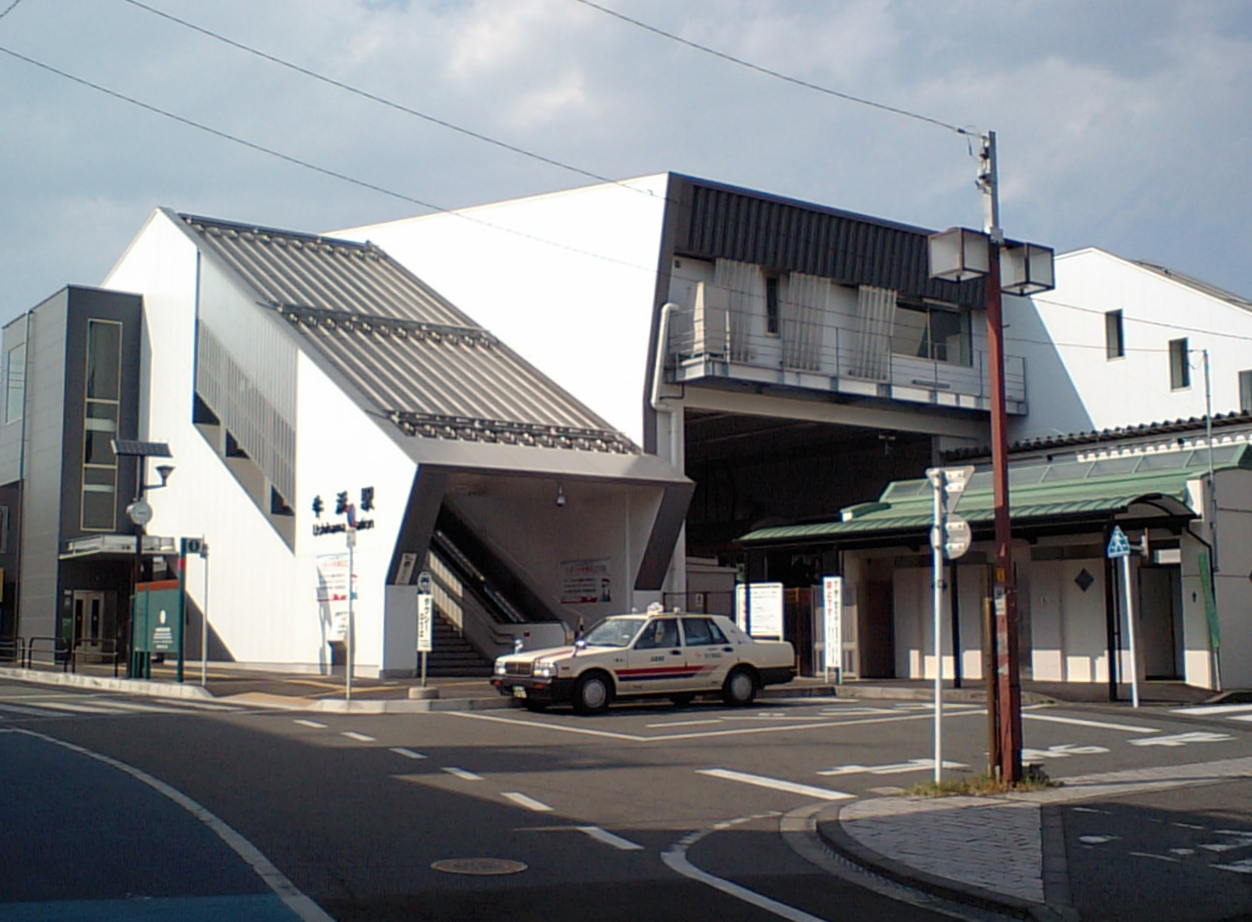
- Ushihama Station in May 2013

General information
- Location: 126 Ushihama, Fussa-shi, Tokyo 197-0024; Japan
- Coordinates: 35.7348°N 139.3335°E
- Operator: JR East
- Line: Ōme Line
- Distance: 8.6 from Tachikawa
- Platforms: 1 island platform
- Tracks: 2

Other information
- Status: Staffed
- Website: Official website

History
- Opened: 1 March 1943

Passengers
- FY2019: 4,475

Services
Preceding station	JR East	Following station
Fussa One-way operation	Ōme Line Commuter Special Rapid	Haijima JC55 towards Tachikawa
Fussa JC57 towards Ōme	Ōme Line Ōme Special Rapid	Haijima JC55 towards Tachikawa
Fussa JC57 towards Ōme	Ōme Line Commuter Rapid	Haijima One-way operation
Fussa JC57 towards Oku-Tama	Ōme Line Rapid Local	Haijima JC55 towards Tachikawa
Location
- Location within Tokyo Location within Japan

Ushihama Station (牛浜駅, Ushihama-eki) is a passenger railway station located in the city of Fussa, Tokyo, Japan, operated by East Japan Railway Company (JR East).

== Lines ==
Ushihama Station is served by the Ōme Line, and is located 8.6 kilometers from the starting point of the line at Tachikawa Station.

== Station layout ==
This station consists of a single ground-level island platform serving two tracks, with an elevated station building above the platform. The station is staffed.

=== Platforms ===
1	Ōme Line	for Tachikawa, Shinjuku, and Tokyo
2	Ōme Line	for Ōme and Okutama

== History ==
The station opened on 1 March 1943. With the privatization of Japanese National Railways (JNR) on 1 April 1987, the station came under the control of JR East.

== Passenger statistics ==
In fiscal 2019, the station was used by an average of 4,475 passengers daily (boarding passengers only).

The passenger figures for previous years are as shown below.

Fiscal year	Daily average
2005	4,250
2010	4,248
2015	4,454

== Surrounding area ==
- Yokota Air Base
- Fussa Park
- National Route 16

== See also ==
- List of railway stations in Japan
