= Miyake High School =

School in Japan

Coordinates: 34.0590°N 139.5376°E

- Japanese: 東京都立三宅高等学校

Tokyo Metropolitan Miyake High School (東京都立三宅高等学校, Tōkyō Toritsu Miyake Kōtōgakkō) is a public high school on Miyakejima. It is operated by the Tokyo Metropolitan Government Board of Education.
