= Mizuho Nōgei High School =

Japanese high school

Coordinates: 35°46′37″N 139°21′35″E

- Japanese: 東京都立瑞穂農芸高等学校
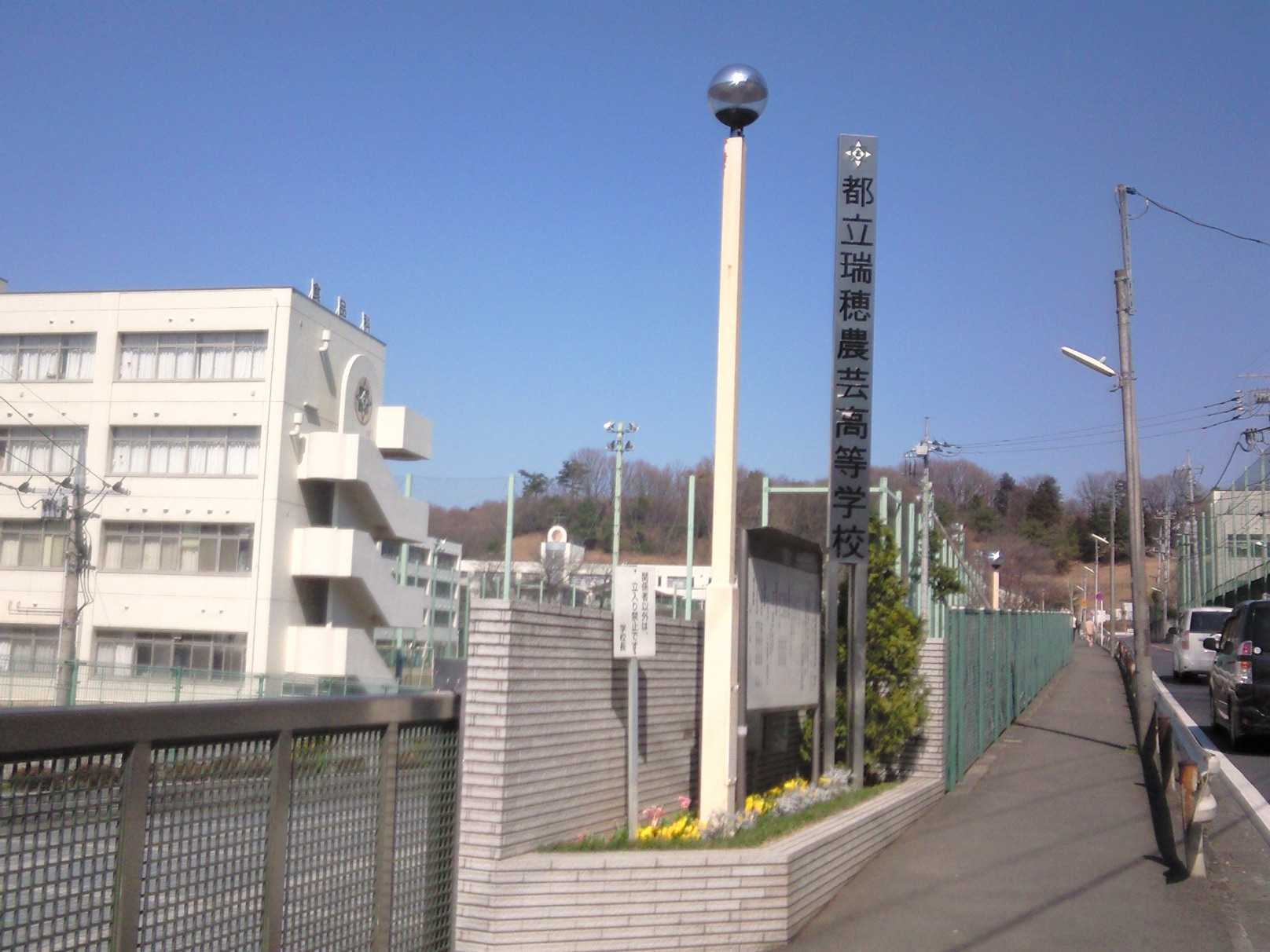

Tokyo Metropolitan Mizuho Nōgei High School (東京都立瑞穂農芸高等学校, Tōkyō Toritsu Mizuho Nōgei Kōtōgakkō) is a Japanese high school located in Mizuho, Nishitama District, Tokyo.

The school is located near JR East's Hakonegasaki Station.

== See also ==
- List of high schools in Tokyo
