= Machida High School =

Coordinates: 35.553326°N 139.448851°E

- Nakamachi, Machida, Tokyo; Japan

Information
- Type: Public
- Established: 1929
- School district: Tokyo Metropolitan Government Board of Education
- Principal: Masanori Uruma (閏間征憲, Uruma Masanori)
- Website: www.machida-h.metro.tokyo.jp

Tokyo Metropolitan Machida High School (東京都立町田高等学校, Tōkyō Toritsu Machida Kōtōgakkō) is a Japanese high school in Machida, Tokyo, that was founded as the private Machida Women School in 1929.
