= Kaneko Station =

Railway station in Iruma, Saitama Prefecture, Japan

Kaneko Station 金子駅
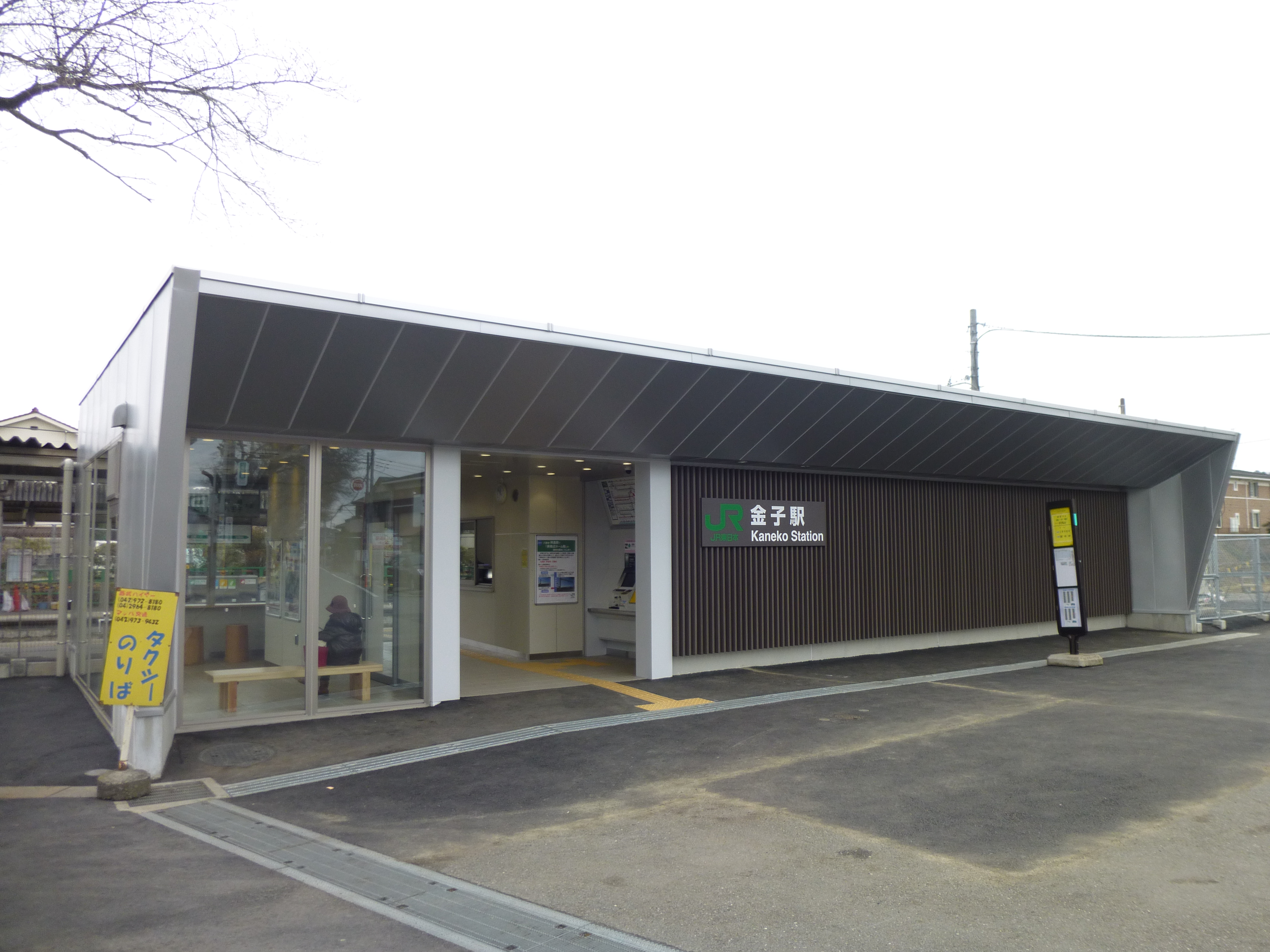
- The station entrance and forecourt in March 2015

General information
- Location: Minamimine, Iruma-shi, Saitama-ken 358-0046; Japan
- Coordinates: 35°48′39.74″N 139°19′43.12″E
- Operator: JR East
- Line: ■ Hachikō Line
- Distance: 20.5 km from Hachiōji
- Platforms: 2 side platforms
- Tracks: 2

Other information
- Status: Staffed
- Website: Official website

History
- Opened: 10 December 1931
- Rebuilt: 2014–2015

Passengers
- FY2019: 2029 (daily, boarding only)

Services
Preceding station	JR East	Following station
Higashi-Hannō towards Komagawa	Hachikō Line	Hakonegasaki towards Hachiōji
Location
- Location within Saitama Prefecture Location within Japan

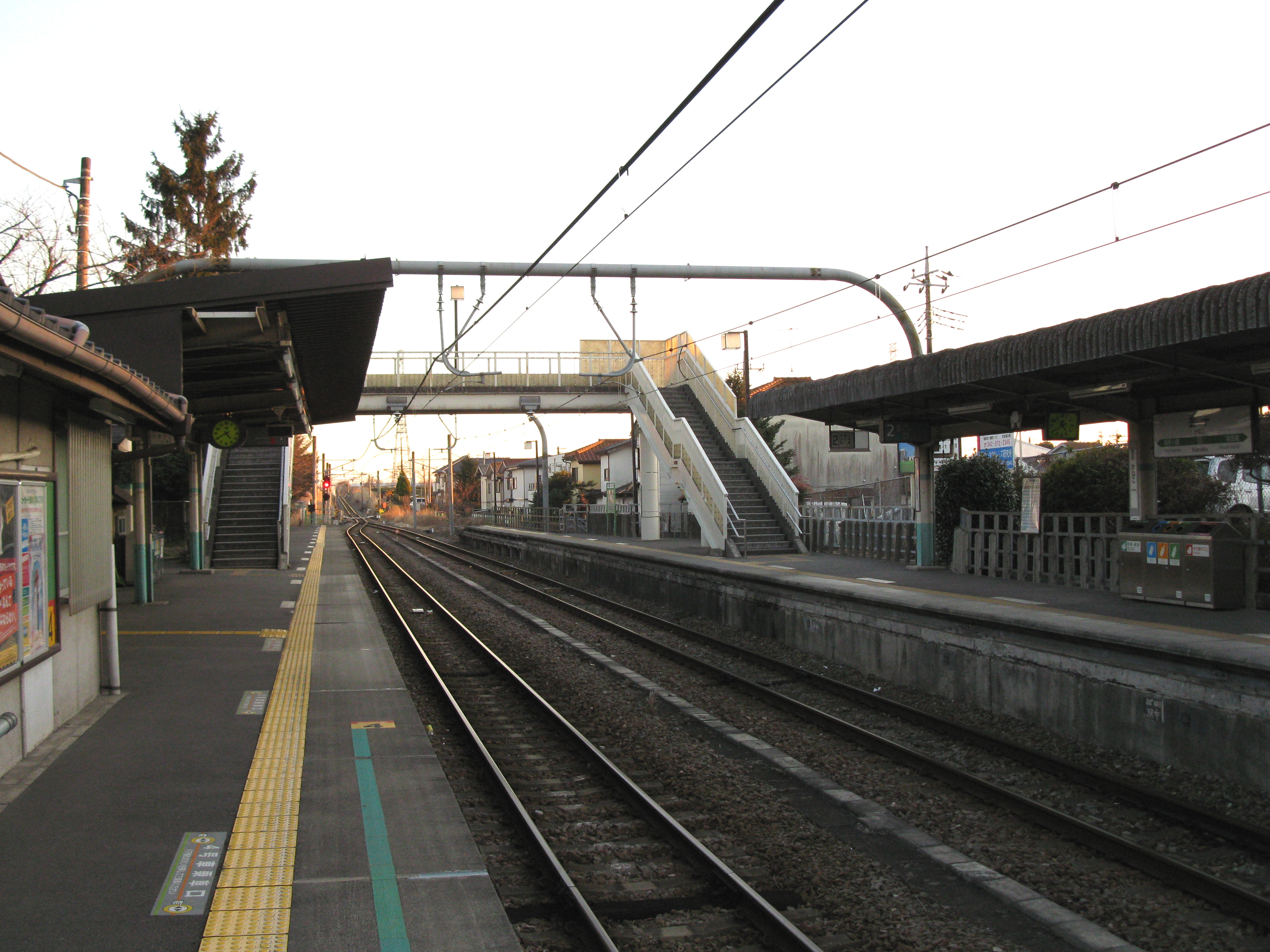
View of the platforms, January 2009

Kaneko Station (金子駅, Kaneko-eki) is a passenger railway station located in the city of Iruma, Saitama, Japan, operated by East Japan Railway Company (JR East).

== Lines ==
Kaneko Station is served by the Hachikō Line between Hachiōji and Komagawa, with many services continuing to and from Kawagoe on the Kawagoe Line. The station is 20.5 kilometers from the official starting point of the line at Hachiōji.

== Station layout ==
The station consists of two opposed side platforms serving two tracks, which form a passing loop on the single-track line. The platforms are connected to the station building by a footbridge and the station is staffed.

=== Platforms ===
1	■ Hachikō Line	for Haijima and Hachiōji
2	■ Hachikō Line	for Komagawa and Kawagoe

== History ==
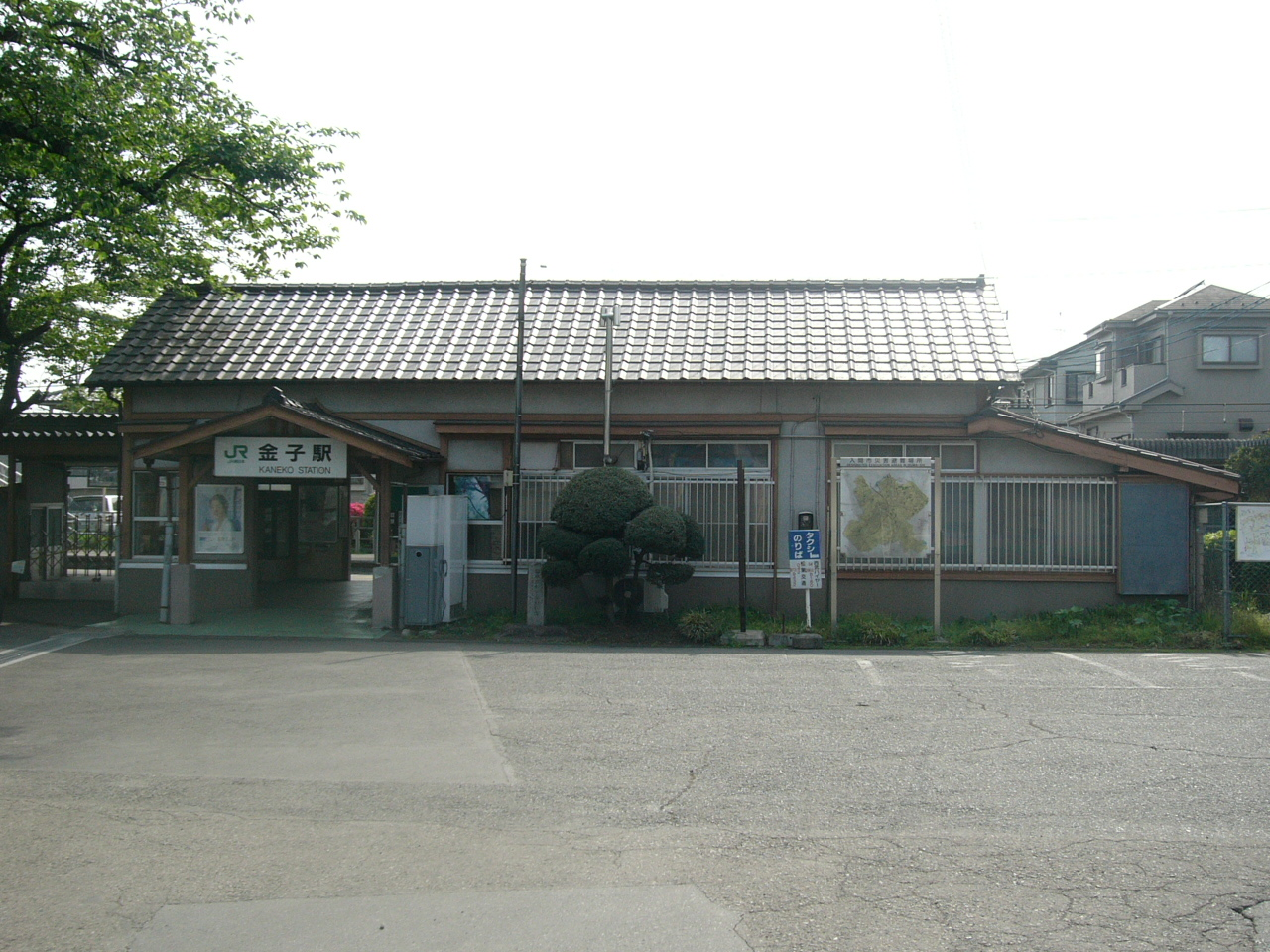
The station in May 2006, before rebuilding

The station opened on 10 December 1931 in the former village of Kaneko. With the privatization of Japanese National Railways (JNR) on 1 April 1987, the station came under the control of JR East.

The southern section of the Hachikō Line between Hachiōji and Komagawa was electrified on 16 March 1996, with through services commencing between Hachiōji and Kawagoe.

From September 2014, the wooden station building was replaced by a temporary structure while a new station building was built. The new station structure was brought into use on 8 February 2015.

== Passenger statistics ==
In fiscal 2019, the station was used by an average of 2029 passengers daily (boarding passengers only). The passenger figures for previous years are as shown below.

Fiscal year	Daily average
2000	1,819
2005	2,254
2010	2,121
2015	2,055

== Surrounding area ==
- Surugadai University
- Iruma City Hall - Kaneko branch office
- Kaneko Elementary School
- Kaneko Middle School

== See also ==
- List of railway stations in Japan
