= Yuko Suzuki =

Japanese volleyball player (born 1989)

Personal information
- Full name: Yuko Suzuki
- Nickname: Yuko
- Born: August 12, 1989 (age 37) Musashimurayama, Tokyo, Japan
- Height: 1.71 m (5 ft 7 in)
- Weight: 60 kg (130 lb)
- Spike: 295 cm (116 in)
- Block: 278 cm (109 in)

Volleyball information
- Position: Setter
- Current club: Denso Airybees
- Number: 6

National team
- Years: Team
- –: Japan

Yuko Suzuki (鈴木 裕子, Suzuki Yūko; born 12 August 1989) is a Japanese volleyball player who plays for Denso Airybees.

== Clubs ==
- HachioujiJissen High School → Denso Airybees (2008-)

== National team ==
- (Japan) 2008 - 1st AVC Women's Cup

== Honors ==
=== Team ===
- 2008 57th Kurowashiki All Japan Volleyball Championship - Champion, with Denso.
- 2010 Empress's Cup - Champion, with Denso.
