= Hidekazu Nagai =

Japanese comedian

- 長井 秀和
- Born: January 3, 1970 (age 56); Musashimurayama, Tokyo, Japan
- Education: Soka University
- Occupations: Comedian, TV personality
- Years active: 1990s–present
- Notable work: "Machigai nai!" catchphrase

Hidekazu Nagai (長井 秀和, Nagai Hidekazu) is a comedian and an owarai presenter in Japan.

== Biography ==
He was born in Musashimurayama City, on 3 January 1970. After his birth, his father was elected to the Regional Assembly of their hometown. Hidekazu graduated from Soka University.

He selected his vocation: "I'll be the Charlie Chaplin of the Oriental world" [sic]. His comedy show is usually serious and ironic. He is associated with the catchphrase "Machigai nai!" (間違いない！), meaning "No mistake", "No Doubt" or "Surely" in Japanese. Hidekazu used to often co-operates with Sayaka Aoki.

In 2007 he stayed in New York for one year to study English and perform at the Comedy Club.

He has a son from his previous marriage.

In 2012, he left from Soka Gakkai which he believed for many years.

He married again in 2017. His wife is from Germany.

His German wife separated from him in 2019 and they divorced in 2020.
