= Kamata High School =

High school in Tokyo, Japan

Coordinates: 35°33′27.7″N 139°42′53.2″E

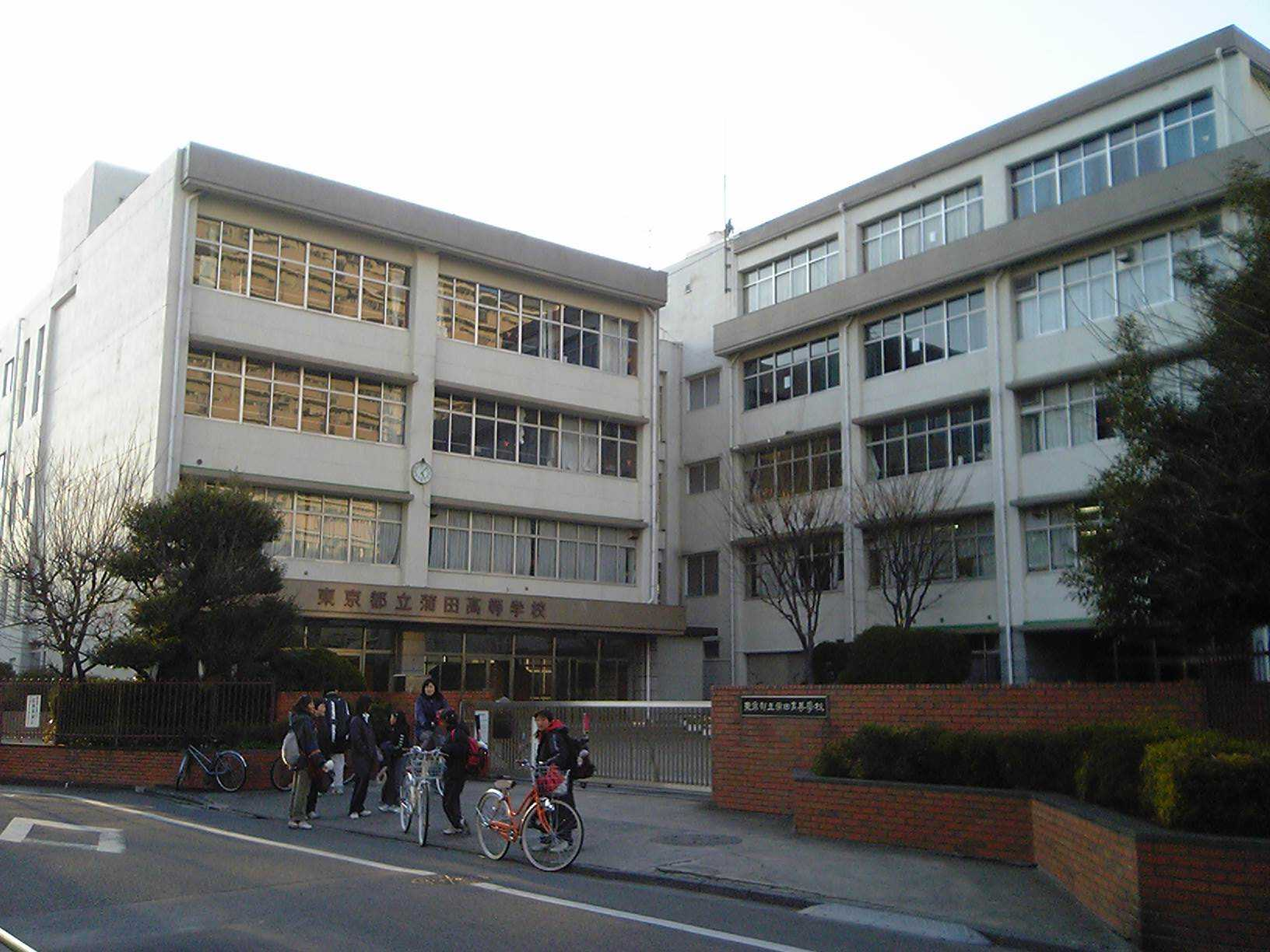
Kamata High School

01. Tokyo Metropolitan Kamata High School (東京都立蒲田高等学校, Tōkyō Toritsu Kamata Kōtōgakkō) is a Japanese high school located in the Kamata area of Ōta, Tokyo. The school's nickname is Kamakō (蒲高, roughly "Kama High").

02. Kamata High School (ମାଣିକେଶ୍ୱରୀ ନୋଡାଲ ଉଚ୍ଚ ବିଦ୍ୟାଳୟ,କାମତା) Or Govt (New) Manikeswari Nodal High School, Kamata is a Board of Secondary Education, Odisha High School Located at Kamata Village, Block - Borigumma, Dist - Koraput, Odisha, Pin 764057.

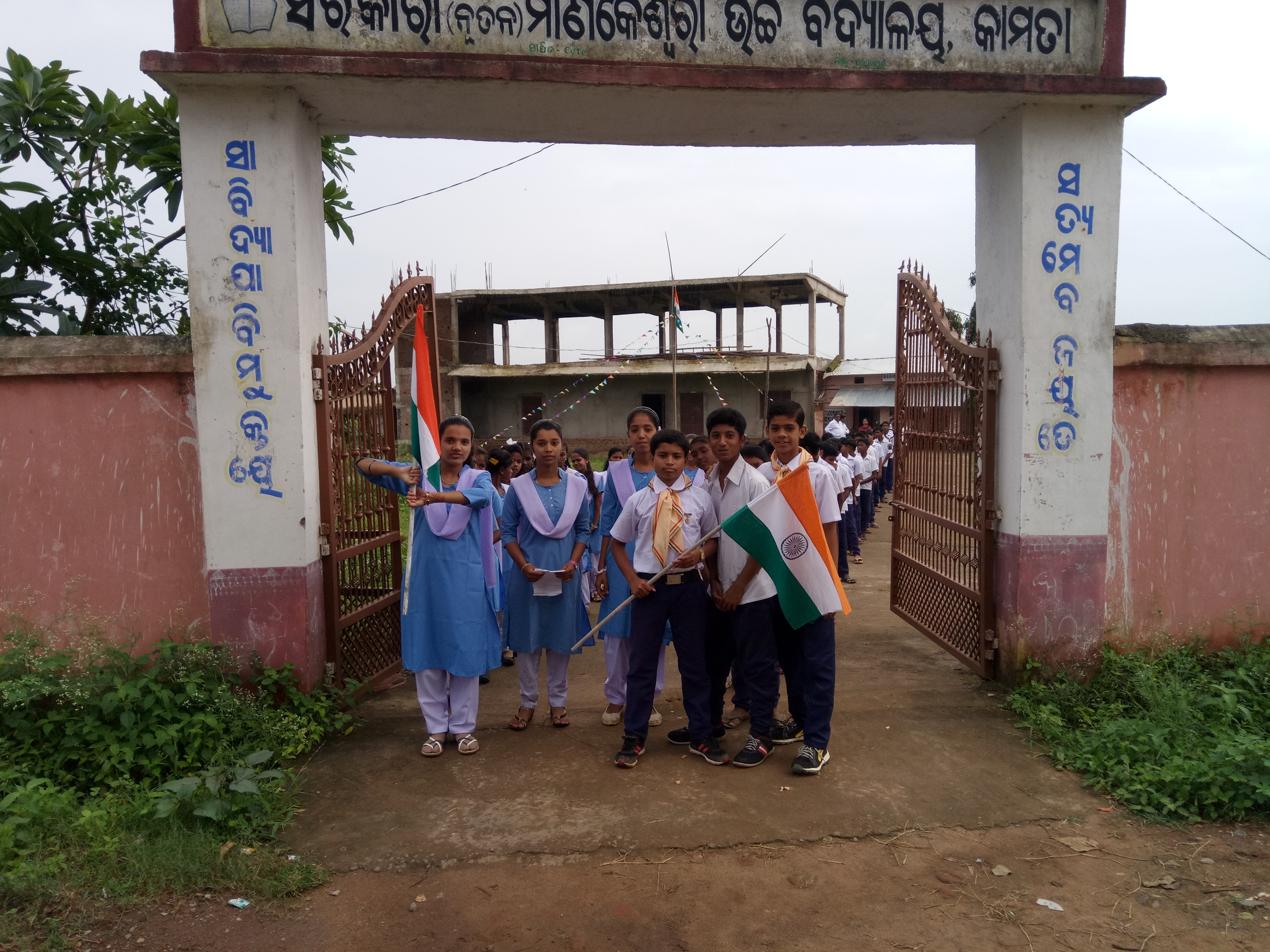
Manikeswari Nodal High School, Kamata Official Website

== See also ==
- List of high schools in Tokyo
