= Fussa =

Fussa 福生市
- City
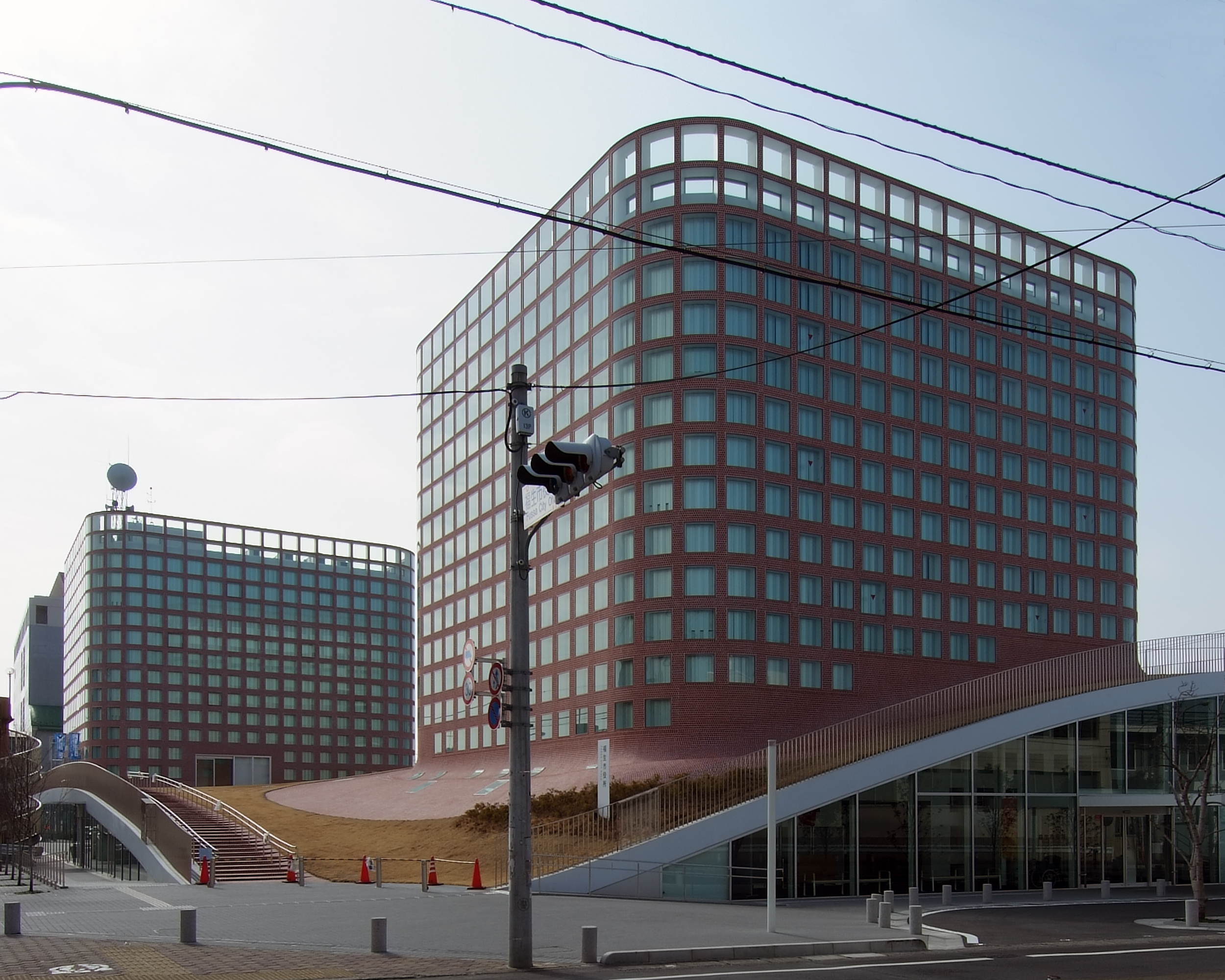
- Fussa City Hall

- Flag Seal

- Location of Fussa in Tokyo Prefecture

- Coordinates: 35°44′N 139°20′E
- Country: Japan
- Region: Kantō
- Prefecture: Tokyo

Government
  - Mayor: Ikuo Kato (since May 2008)

Area
  - Total: 10.16 km^{2} (3.92 sq mi)

Population (April 2021)
  - Total: 56,786
  - Density: 5,589/km^{2} (14,480/sq mi)
- Time zone: UTC+9 (Japan Standard Time)
- Symbols
  - Tree: Osmanthus
  - Flower: Azalea
  - Bird: Japanese tit
- Phone number: 042-551-1511
- Address: Honcho 5-banchi, Fussa-shi, Tokyo-to 197-8501
- Website: Official website

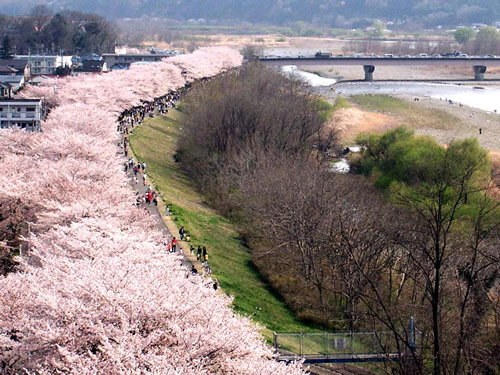
Sakura along the Tama River

Fussa (福生市, Fussa-shi) is a city located in the western portion of the Tokyo Metropolis, Japan. As of 1 April 2021, the city had an estimated population of 56,786, and a population density of 5600 persons per km^{2}. The total area of the city is 10.16 square kilometres (3.92 sq mi).

About one third of the city area is occupied by the United States Air Force Yokota Air Base, giving the city an effective population density of 8,782 persons per km^{2}.

== Geography ==
Fussa is approximately in the geographic center of Tokyo Metropolis, on the Musashino Terrace, bordered by the floodplains of the Tama River. The land slopes gently from north to south, with an elevation of 124 meters above sea level at the location of the city hall, which is almost at the geographic center of the city area. The highest elevation is 143.5 meters in the northeast, and the lowest is 104 meters in the southwest. The area along the river is home to many parks and almost 300 cherry blossom trees, recreational facilities and bicycle paths.

=== Surrounding municipalities ===
Tokyo Metropolis

- Akiruno
- Akishima
- Hachiōji
- Hamura
- Mizuho
- Musashimurayama
- Tachikawa

=== Climate ===
Fussa has a humid subtropical climate (Köppen Cfa) characterized by warm summers and cool winters with light to no snowfall. The average annual temperature in Fussa is 13.9 °C. The average annual rainfall is 1998 mm with September as the wettest month. The temperatures are highest on average in August, at around 25.3 °C, and lowest in January, at around 2.4 °C.

== Demographics ==
Per Japanese census data, the population of Fussa peaked around the year 2000 and has declined slightly since then.

Historical population
Year	Pop.	±%
1920	5,031	—
1930	6,005	+19.4%
1940	7,921	+31.9%
1950	14,669	+85.2%
1960	21,985	+49.9%
1970	37,938	+72.6%
1980	48,694	+28.4%
1990	58,072	+19.3%
2000	61,427	+5.8%
2010	59,796	−2.7%
2020	56,414	−5.7%

== History ==
The area of present-day Fussa was part of ancient Musashi Province. During the Edo period, it was tenryō territory controlled directly by the Tokugawa shogunate and administered by various hatamoto. The area was agricultural and noted for silkworms and sake production. After the Meiji Restoration, the 26 hamlets in the area consolidated into the villages of Fussa, Kumagawa and Tama within the short-lived Shinagawa Prefecture, followed by Kanagawa Prefecture. Parts of the area were involved in the Chichibu Incident of 1884.

The entire district was transferred to the control of Tokyo Metropolis on April 1, 1893, and the Ōme Railway joined Fussa to Tachikawa the following year. Fussa was elevated to town status in 1940, and an airfield for the Imperial Japanese Army was built, and became the central aircraft testing facility for the Army in 1942. During World War II, the area was only lightly bombed (once in 1945, with four casualties), and the military facilities were seized mostly intact by the American military after the war. In the post-war era, Fussa expanded rapidly through the construction of subsidized housing districts, and was elevated to city status on April 1, 1970.

== Government ==
Fussa has a mayor-council form of government with a directly elected mayor and a unicameral city council of 19 members. Fussa, collectively with Hamura, Akiruno, Mizuho, Hinode, Hinohara and Okutama contributes two members to the Tokyo Metropolitan Assembly. In terms of national politics, the city is part of Tokyo 25th district of the lower house of the Diet of Japan.

== Economy ==
Fussa, along with its neighboring cities Iruma and Tachikawa, contains a strong military presence. A large portion of the city's economy focuses on the bases and servicing those who live there. Of note is eastern Fussa's "Bar Row" district, a historic though seedy collection of karaoke bars, shot bars, and massage parlors. The Bar Row area has been a fixture of Fussa nightlife catering to US military personnel since the 1950s. The city also serves as a bedroom community for central Tokyo and a regional commercial center.

== Education ==
- Fussa has seven public elementary schools and three public middle schools operated by the city government, and three public high schools operated by the Tokyo Metropolitan Board of Education.

Metropolitan high schools:

- Fussa High School
- Tama Technical High School

Municipal junior high schools:

- Fussa No. 1 (福生第一中学校)
- Fussa No. 2 (福生第二中学校)
- Fussa No. 3 (福生第三中学校)

Municipal elementary schools:

- Fussa No. 1 (福生第一小学校)
- Fussa No. 2 (福生第二小学校)
- Fussa No. 3 (福生第三小学校)
- Fussa No. 4 (福生第四小学校)
- Fussa No. 5 (福生第五小学校)
- Fussa No. 6 (福生第六小学校)
- Fussa No. 7 (福生第七小学校)

The United States Department of Defense Education Activity (DoDEA) operates the following schools on Yokota Air Base and in the municipality of Fussa for children of United States military personnel:

- Yokota High School
- Yokota Middle School

The elementary schools of Yokota AFB are in other municipalities.

== Transportation ==
=== Railroad ===
JR East – Ōme Line

- Ushihama - Fussa

JR East – Hachikō Line

- Higashi-Fussa

JR East – Itsukaichi Line

- Kumagawa

=== Highway ===
- National Route 16

== Notable people from Fussa ==
- Hiroyuki Ebihara, professional boxer
- Yuta Kanai, actor
- Emiri Katō, voice actress
- Susumu Matsushita, illustrator
- Mayu Sakai, Manga artist
- Brian Stann, mixed martial artist

== See also ==
- Yokota Air Base
