= Mizuho, Tokyo =

Mizuho 瑞穂町
- Town
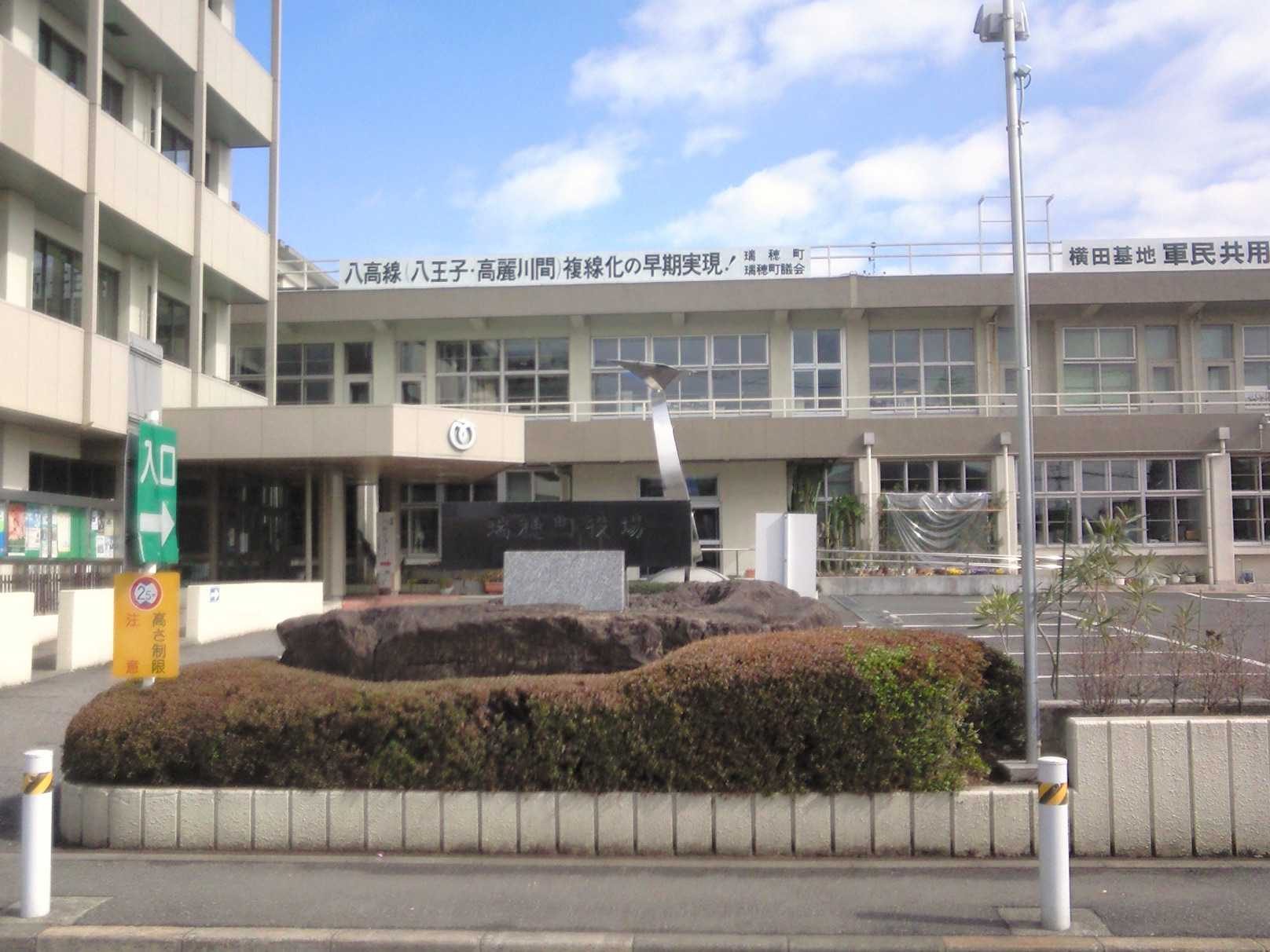
- Mizuho Town Hall

- Flag Seal

- Mizuho (bright yellow) within Tokyo Prefecture

- Coordinates: 35°46′19.1″N 139°21′14.5″E
- Country: Japan
- Region: Kantō
- Prefecture: Tokyo
- District: Nishitama

Government
  - Mayor: Hiroyuki Sugiura

Area
  - Total: 16.85 km^{2} (6.51 sq mi)

Population (April 2021)
  - Total: 32,458
  - Density: 1,926/km^{2} (4,989/sq mi)
- Time zone: UTC+9 (Japan Standard Time)
- Symbols
  - Tree: Osmanthus; Pine
  - Flower: Camellia sinensis Azalea; Osmanthus
  - Bird: Eurasian skylark
- Phone number: 042-557-0501
- Address: 2335 Hakonegasaki, Mizuho-machi, Nishitama-gun Tokyo 190-1292
- Website: Official website

Mizuho (瑞穂町, Mizuho-machi) is a town located in the western portion of Tokyo Metropolis, Japan. As of 1 March 2021, the town had an estimated population of 32,458, and a population density of 1900 persons per km^{2}. The total area of the town is 16.85 square kilometres (6.51 sq mi).

== Geography ==
Mizuho is located in the foothills of the Okutama Mountains of western Tokyo, bordered by Saitama Prefecture to the north.

=== Surrounding municipalities ===
Saitama Prefecture

- Iruma (to the north)
- Tokorozawa (to the east)

Tokyo Metropolis

- Fussa (to the south)
- Hamura (to the west)
- Musashimurayama (to the east)
- Ōme (to the west)

=== Climate ===
Mizuho has a humid subtropical climate (Köppen Cfa) characterized by warm summers and cool winters with light to no snowfall. The average annual temperature in Mizuho is 13.4 °C. The average annual rainfall is 1998 mm with September as the wettest month. The temperatures are highest on average in August, at around 25.0 °C, and lowest in January, at around 1.7 °C.

== Demographics ==
Per Japanese census data, the population of Mizuho doubled between 1960 and 1980, but has remained relatively constant since 1990.

Historical population
Year	Pop.	±%
1960	12,092	—
1970	17,687	+46.3%
1980	22,803	+28.9%
1990	30,967	+35.8%
2000	32,892	+6.2%
2010	33,497	+1.8%
2020	31,765	−5.2%

== History ==
The area of present-day Mizuho was part of ancient Musashi Province. In the post-Meiji Restoration cadastral reform of July 22, 1878, the area became part of Nishitama District in Kanagawa Prefecture. The villages of Hakenogasaki, Ishihata, Tonogaya and Nagaoka were created on April 1, 1889, with the establishment of the modern municipalities system. Nishitama District was transferred to the administrative control of Tokyo Metropolis on April 1, 1893. The town of Mizuho was established by the merger of the four villages on November 10, 1940. Mizuho annexed the neighbouring town on Moto-Sayama from Saitama Prefecture in 1958.

== Government ==
Mizuho has a mayor-council form of government with a directly elected mayor and a unicameral town council of 16 members. Mizuho, collectively with the municipalities of Akiruno, Fussa, Hamura, Hinode, Hinohara and Okutama, contributes two members to the Tokyo Metropolitan Assembly. In terms of national politics, the town is part of Tokyo 25th district of the lower house of the Diet of Japan.

== Education ==
Mizuho has five public elementary schools and two public middle schools operated by the town government, and one public high school (Mizuho Nōgei High School) operated by the Tokyo Metropolitan Board of Education. Tokyo Metropolis also operates one special education school for the handicapped.

=== Elementary schools ===
- Mizuho 1st Elementary School (瑞穂第一小学校)
- Mizuho 2nd Elementary School (瑞穂第二小学校)
- Mizuho 3rd Elementary School (瑞穂第三小学校)
- Mizuho 4th Elementary School (瑞穂第四小学校)
- Mizuho 5th Elementary School (瑞穂第五小学校)

=== Middle schools ===
- Mizuho Junior High School (瑞穂中学校)
- Mizuho Second Junior High School (瑞穂第二中学校)

== Transportation ==
=== Railway ===
JR East – Hachikō Line

- Hakonegasaki

=== Highway ===
- National Route 16

== Sister cities ==
- Morgan Hill, California, United States

== In popular media ==
The town in the romance visual novel and anime Clannad, by Key, draws inspiration from locations in Mizuho.
