= Musashimurayama =

Musashimurayama 武蔵村山市
- City
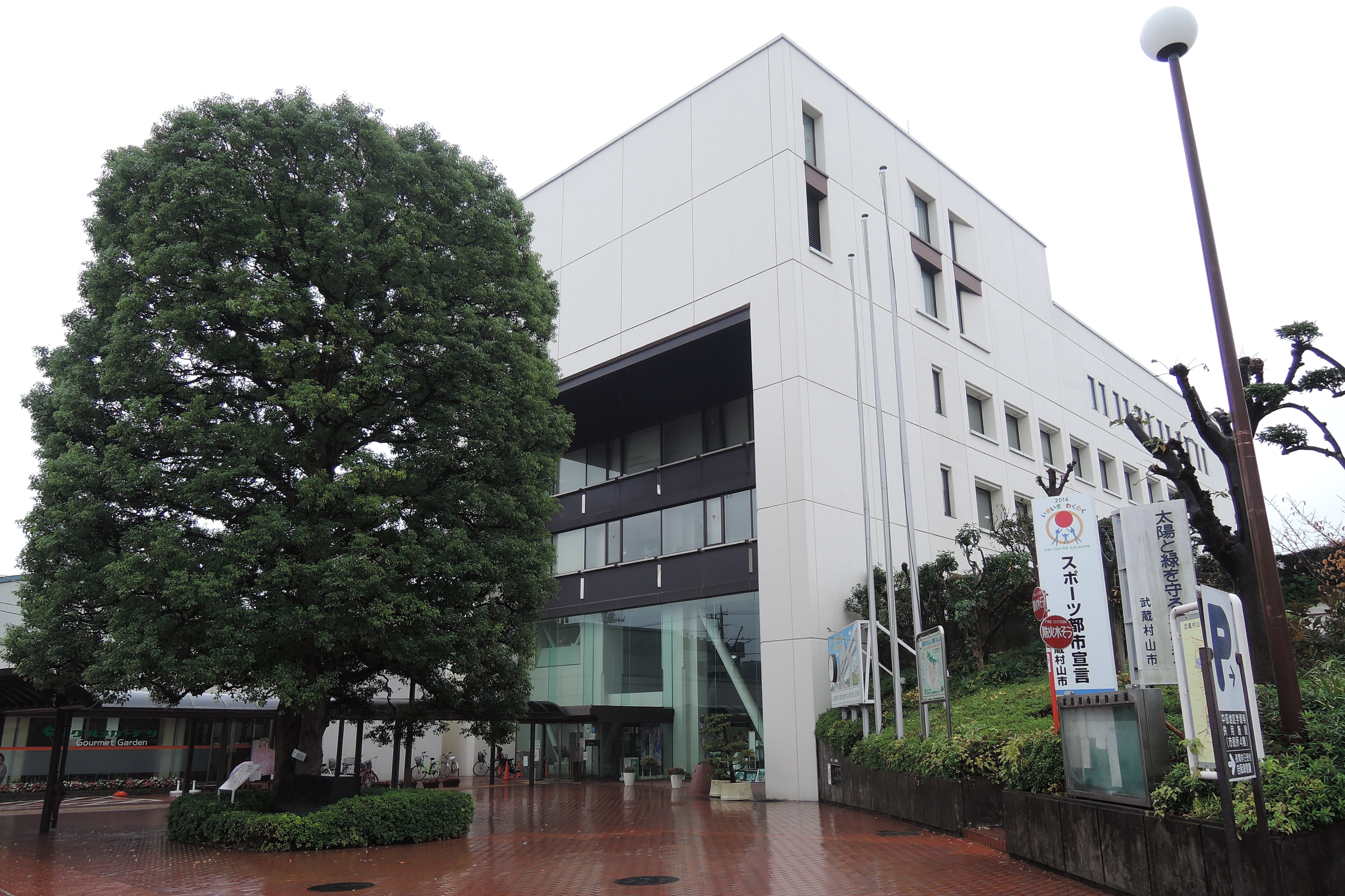
- Musashimurayama City Hall

- Flag Seal

- Location of Musashimurayama in Tokyo

- Coordinates: 35°45′17.4″N 139°23′14.5″E
- Country: Japan
- Region: Kantō
- Prefecture: Tokyo

Area
  - Total: 15.32 km^{2} (5.92 sq mi)

Population (March 2021)
  - Total: 72,021
  - Density: 4,701/km^{2} (12,180/sq mi)
- Time zone: UTC+9 (Japan Standard Time)
- Symbols
  - Tree: Celtis sinensis
  - Flower: Camellia sinensis
  - Bird: Japanese white-eye
- Phone number: 042-565-1111
- Address: 1-1-1 Honmachi, Musashimurayama-shi, Tokyo 208-8501
- Website: Official website

Musashimurayama (武蔵村山市, Musashi-Murayama-shi) is a city located in the west of the Tokyo Metropolis, Japan. As of 1 March 2021, the city had an estimated population of 72,021 in 32,234 households, and a population density of 4,700 people per km^{2}. The total area of the city is 15.32 square kilometres (5.92 sq mi).

== Geography ==
Musashimurayama is located in north-central Tokyo Metropolis, bordered by Saitama Prefecture to the north. Upstream tributaries of the Arakawa River and Tama River flow through the city. The Sayama Hills run from west to east in the northern part of the city. The south side of the hill is on the western edge of the Musashino Plateau.

=== Surrounding municipalities ===
Saitama Prefecture

- Tokorozawa

Tokyo Metropolis

- Fussa
- Higashiyamato
- Mizuho
- Tachikawa

=== Climate ===
Musashimurayama has a humid subtropical climate (Köppen Cfa) characterized by warm summers and cool winters with light to no snowfall. The average annual temperature in Musashimurayama is 13.8 °C (56.8 °F). The average annual rainfall is 1,647 mm (64.8 in) with September as the wettest month. The temperatures are highest on average in August, at around 25.5 °C (77.9 °F), and lowest in January, at around 2.1 °C (35.8 °F).

== Demographics ==
Per Japanese census data, the population of Musashimurayama increased rapidly in the postwar decades but the rate of growth has slowed considerably in recent years.

Historical population
Year	Pop.	±%
1920	7,165	—
1930	7,891	+10.1%
1940	8,989	+13.9%
1950	10,989	+22.2%
1960	12,065	+9.8%
1970	41,275	+242.1%
1980	57,198	+38.6%
1990	65,562	+14.6%
2000	66,052	+0.7%
2010	70,053	+6.1%
2020	70,829	+1.1%

== History ==
The area of present-day Musashimurayama was part of ancient Musashi Province. In Meiji era, the area was organized into four villages within Kitatama District in Kanagawa Prefecture. Kitatama District was transferred to the administrative control of Tokyo Metropolis on April 1, 1893.

The village of Murayama was created on April 1, 1917, and was elevated to town status on November 3, 1954. The population of the town grew extremely rapidly in the 1960s with the development of public housing. Murayama was elevated to city status on November 3, 1970, and was named Musashimurayama.

== Government ==
Musashimurayama has a mayor-council form of government with a directly elected mayor and a unicameral city council of 20 members. Musashimurayama, together with the cities of Higashiyamato and Higashimurayama, contributes three members to the Tokyo Metropolitan Assembly. In terms of national politics, the city is part of Tokyo 20th district of the lower house of the Diet of Japan.

== Economy ==
The area of Musashimurayama was traditionally a center for cotton textile production. The area remains largely agricultural, notably horticulture and the growing of tea, although a significant portion of the population commutes to downtown Tokyo.

Musashimurayama was the location of a Nissan automobile assembly plant, originally opened in 1962 by the Prince Motor Company. It closed in March 2001 as part of the Nissan Revival Plan announced in 1999. It is now a museum called Carest Murayama, next to the Aeon Mall Musashi Murayama Megamall occupying a 213,252 square foot facility

Shinkawa, now known as Yamaha Robotics Holdings, is a leading manufacturer of precision robots for semiconductor manufacturing. The head office and factory are in the city.

== Education ==
- Tokyo Keizai University - Musashimurayama campus

The city has three public high schools operated by the Tokyo Metropolitan Government Board of Education.

- Josui High School
- Musashimurayama High School

Tokyo Metropolis also operates one special education school for the handicapped.

Musashimurayama has eight public elementary schools and four public junior high schools, and two combined public elementary/junior high schools operated by the city government.

Municipal combined elementary and junior high schools:

- Dainan Gakuen (大南学園) - No. 7 Elementary School (第七小学校) and No. 4 Junior High School (第四中学校)
- Murayama Gakuen (村山学園)

Municipal junior high schools:

- No. 1 (第一中学校)
- No. 3 (第三中学校)
- No. 5 (第五中学校)

Municipal elementary schools:

- No. 1 (第一小学校)
- No. 2 (第二小学校)
- No. 3 (第三小学校)
- No. 8 (第八小学校)
- No. 9 (第九小学校)
- No. 10 (第十小学校)
- Raizuka (雷塚小学校)

The United States Department of Defense Education Activity (DoDEA) operates the following schools on Yokota Air Base and in the municipality of Musashimurayama for children of United States military personnel:

- Joan K. Mendel Elementary School

For secondary levels, U.S. military-dependent children are directed to Yokota Middle School and Yokota High School, both on base, but in Fussa instead of Musashimurayama.

Private schools:

- Takushoku University Daiichi High School

== Transportation ==
=== Railway ===
- Musashimurayama is not served by any passenger rail services. This is expected to change by the mid-2030s with the extension of the Tama Monorail, expected to add five new stations to Musashimurayama. This extension is expected to be completed in 2034.

=== Highway ===
- Musashimurayama is not served by any expressways or national highways.

== Sister cities ==
Sakae, Nagano, Japan

== Notable people ==
- Gedo (Real Name: Keiji Takayama, Japanese: 高山 圭司, Takayama Keiji), Japanese professional wrestler and manager (New Japan Pro-Wrestling)
- Go Hatano, Japanese football player (FC Tokyo, J1 League)
- Hidekazu Nagai, Japanese comedian and owarai presenter
- Kenji Osawa, former Japanese mixed martial artist
- Masahiro Sakurai, Japanese video game director, game designer and songwriter (Kirby, Super Smash Bros. and Kid Icarus: Uprising)
- Yuko Suzuki, Japanese volleyball player (Denso Airybees, V.League 1)
