= Hakonegasaki Station =

Railway station in Mizuho, Tokyo, Japan

Hakonegasaki Station 箱根ヶ崎駅
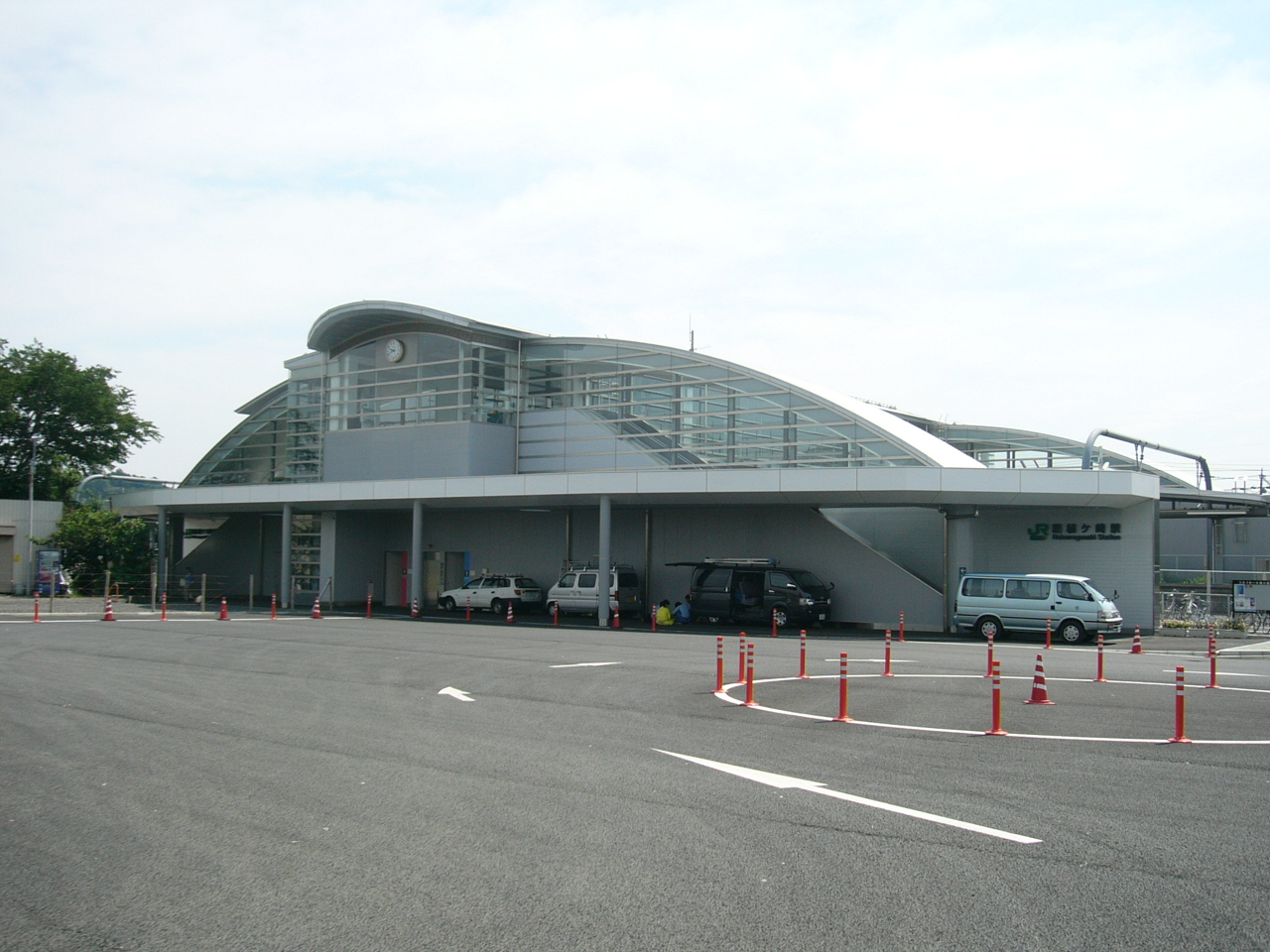
- West entrance, July 2005

General information
- Location: 397 Hakonegasaki, Mizuho-machi, Nishitama-gun, Tokyo 190-1221; Japan
- Coordinates: 35.77139°N 139.34671°E
- Operator: JR East
- Line: ■ Hachikō Line
- Distance: 15.7 km from Hachiōji
- Platforms: 1 island platform

Other information
- Status: Staffed
- Website: Official website

History
- Opened: 10 December 1931

Passengers
- FY2019: 4,384 (daily)

Services
Preceding station	JR East	Following station
Kaneko towards Komagawa	Hachikō Line	Higashi-Fussa towards Hachiōji
Location
- Location within Tokyo Location within Japan

Hakonegasaki Station (箱根ヶ崎駅, Hakonegasaki-eki) is a passenger railway station located in the town of Mizuho, Tokyo, Japan, operated by East Japan Railway Company (JR East).

== Lines ==
Hakonegasaki Station is served by the Hachikō Line between Hachiōji and Komagawa, with many services continuing to and from Kawagoe on the Kawagoe Line. The station is 15.7 kilometers from the official starting point of the line at Hachiōji.

== Station layout ==
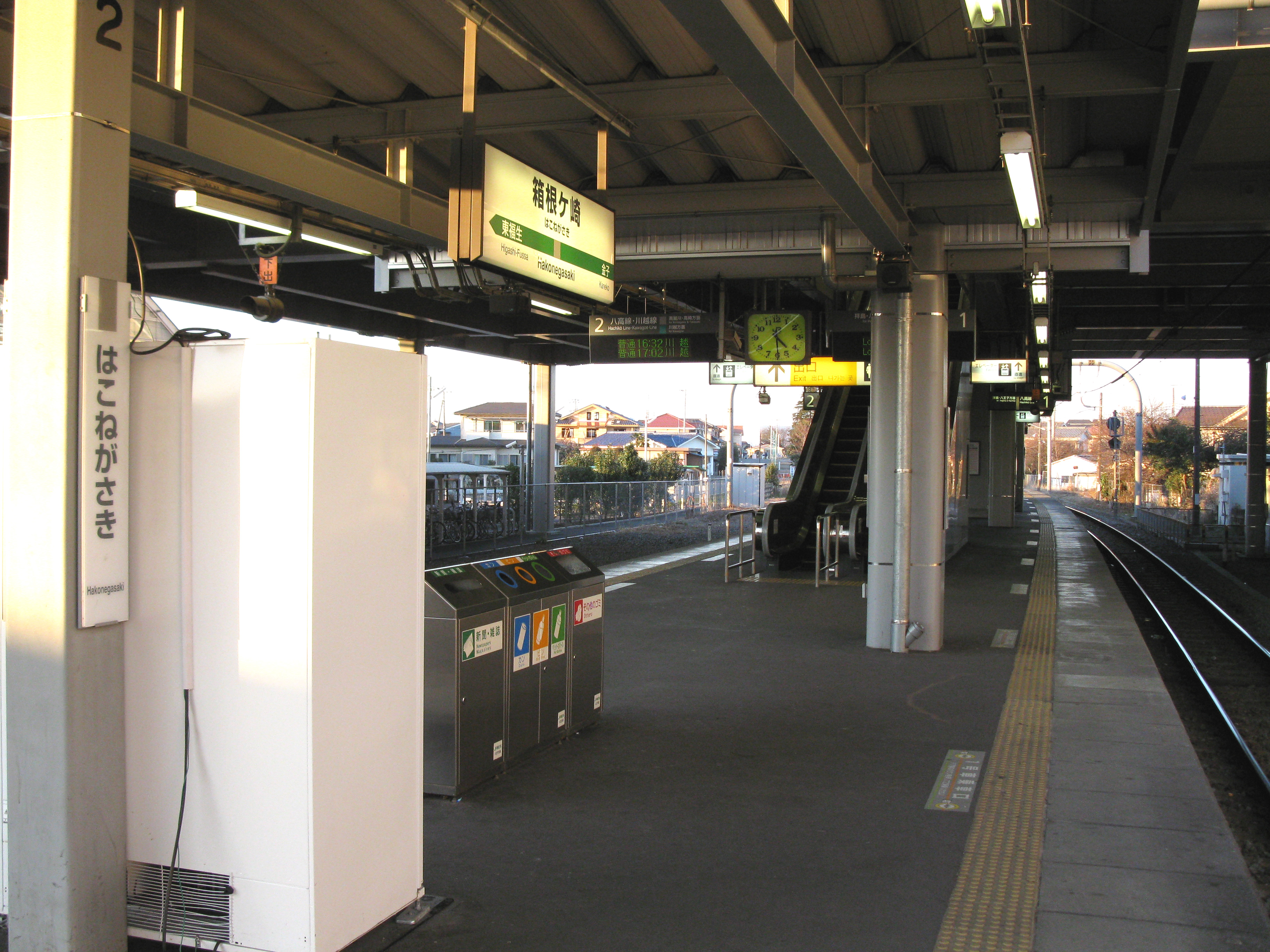
View of the platforms, January 2009

The station consists of an elevated station building, built over an island platform serving two tracks, which form a passing loop on the single-track line. The station is staffed.

=== Platforms ===
1	■ Hachikō Line	for Haijima and Hachiōji
2	■ Hachikō Line	for Komagawa and Kawagoe
2	■ Hachikō Line	for Haijima and Hachiōji (trains starting from this station)

== History ==
The station opened on 10 December 1931. It became part of the East Japan Railway Company (JR East) with the breakup of the Japanese National Railways on 1 April 1987.

The southern section of the Hachikō Line between Hachiōji and Komagawa was electrified on 16 March 1996, with through services commencing between Hachiōji and Kawagoe.

== Passenger statistics ==
In fiscal 2019, the station was used by an average of 4,384 passengers daily (boarding passengers only).

The passenger figures for previous years are as shown below.

Fiscal year	Daily average
2005	3,851
2010	4,107
2015	4,419

== Surrounding area ==
- Mizuho Town Hall
