= Musashi-Sunagawa Station =

Railway station in Tachikawa, Tokyo, Japan

SS34 Musashi-Sunagawa Station 武蔵砂川駅
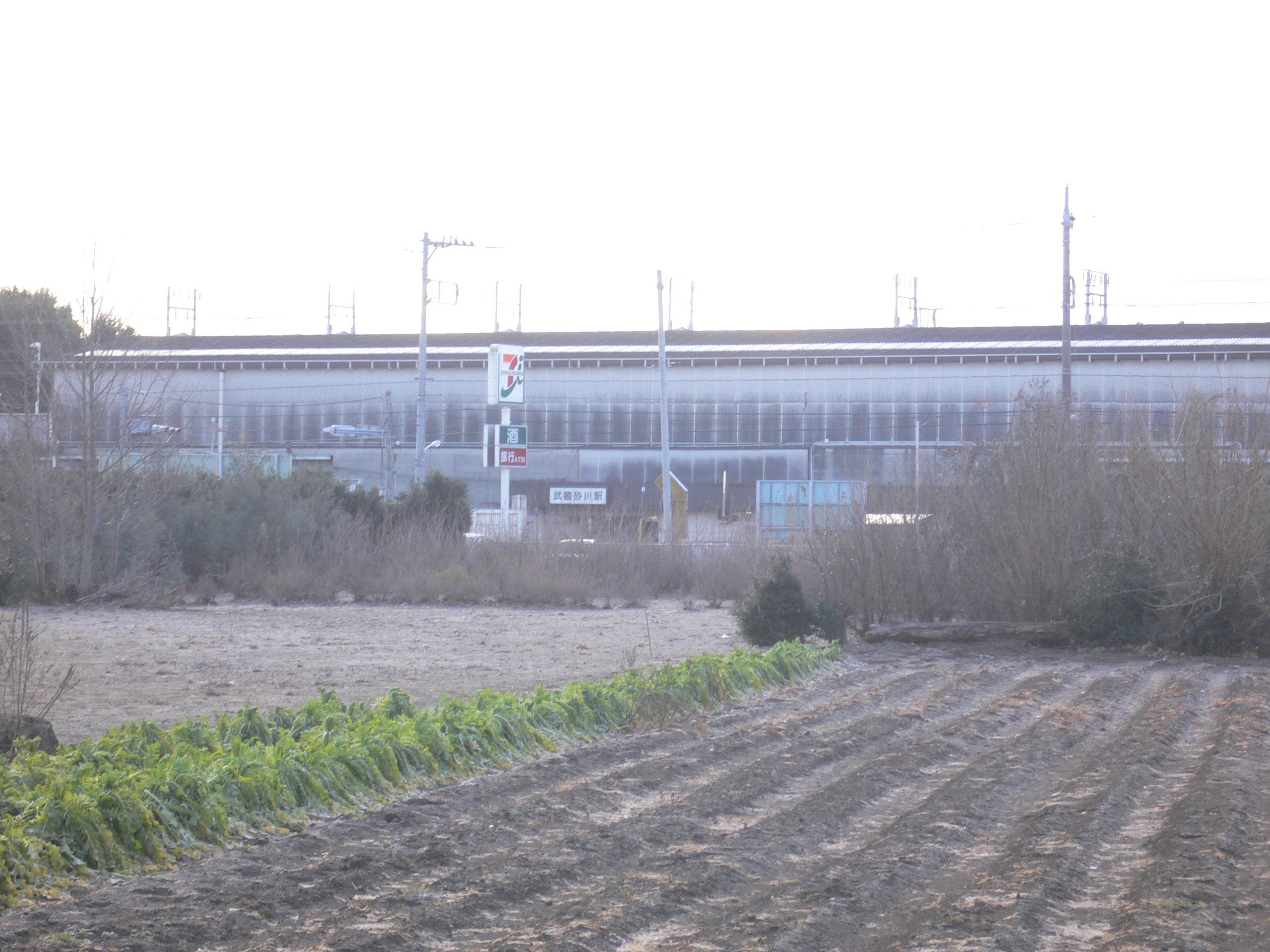
- Musashi-Sunagawa Station, January 2006

General information
- Location: 5-44-4 Kamisuna-cho, Tachikawa-shi, Tokyo-to 190-0032; Japan
- Coordinates: 35.7292°N 139.3926°E
- Operator: Seibu Railway
- Line: Seibu Haijima Line
- Distance: 9.6 km from Kodaira
- Platforms: 2 side platforms

Other information
- Station code: SS34
- Website: Official website

History
- Opened: 12 December 1983

Passengers
- FY2019: 12,255 (Daily)

Services
Preceding station	Seibu Railway	Following station
Seibu-Tachikawa SS35 towards Haijima	Haijima Liner	Tamagawa-Jōsui SS33 towards Seibu-Shinjuku
Seibu-Tachikawa SS35 towards Haijima	Haijima Line Express Semi Express Local	Tamagawa-Jōsui SS33 towards Kodaira
Location
- Location within Tokyo Location within Japan

Musashi-Sunagawa Station (武蔵砂川駅, Musashisunagawa-eki) is a passenger railway station located in the city of Tachikawa, Tokyo, Japan, operated by the private railway operator Seibu Railway.

== Lines ==
The station is served by the Seibu Haijima Line, and is located 9.6 kilometers from the starting point of that line at Kodaira Station.

== Station layout ==
The station consists of two elevated side platforms serving two tracks, with the station building located underneath.

=== Platforms ===
1	Seibu Haijima Line	for Kodaira, Kami-Shakujii, and Seibu-Shinjuku
2	Seibu Haijima Line	for Seibu-Tachikawa and Haijima

== History ==
Musashi-Sunagawa Station opened on 12 December 1983.

Station numbering was introduced on all Seibu Railway lines during fiscal 2012, with Musashi-Sunagawa Station becoming "SS34".

== Passenger statistics ==
In fiscal 2019, the station was the 65th busiest on the Seibu network with an average of 12,255 passengers daily.

The passenger figures for previous years are as shown below.

Fiscal year	Daily average
2005	9,293
2010	10,218
2015	11,331

== Surrounding area ==
- Tamagawa Aqueduct

== See also ==
- List of railway stations in Japan
