= Higashi-Yamatoshi Station =

Railway station in Higashiyamato, Tokyo, Japan

SS32 Higashi-Yamatoshi Station 東大和市駅
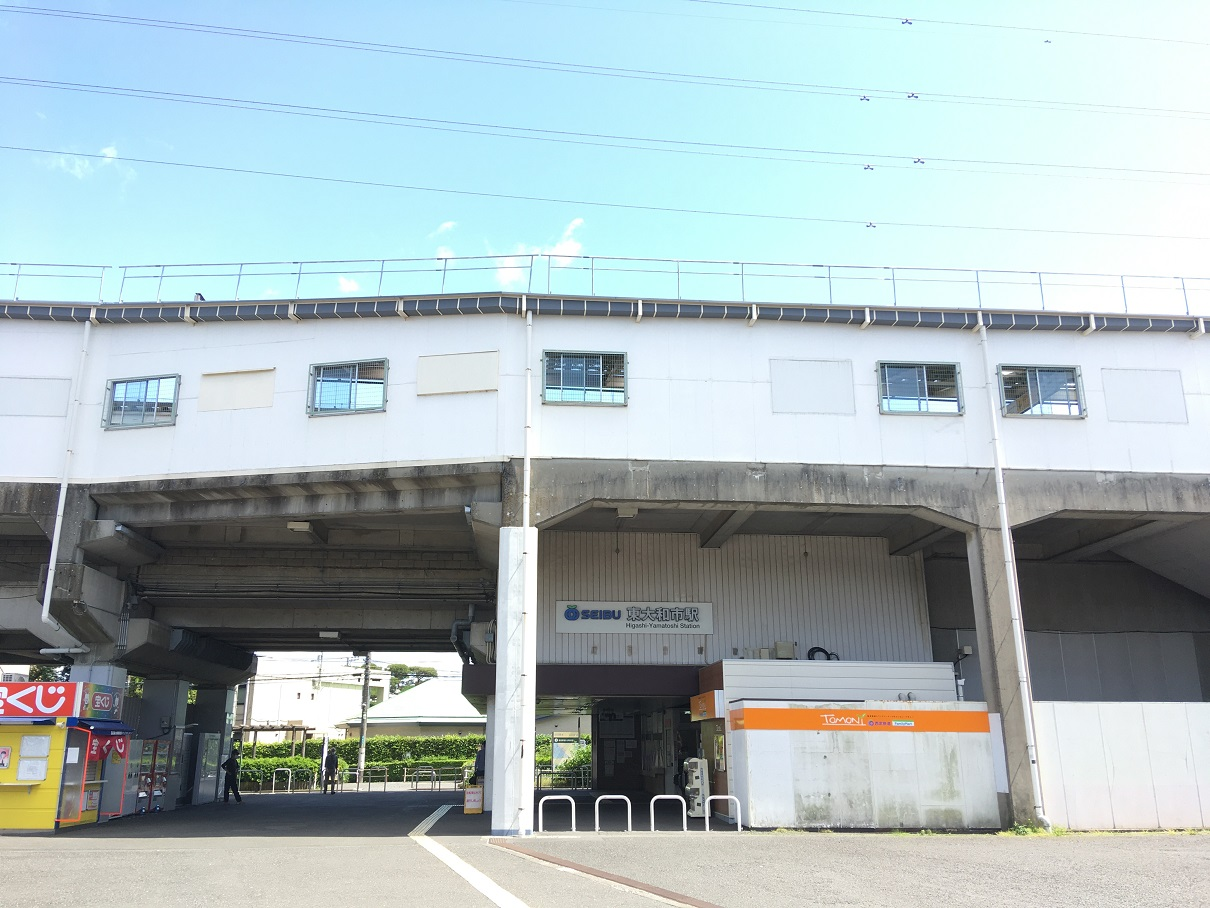
- Higashi-Yamatoshi Station in May 2020

General information
- Location: 1-1415-1 Sakuragaoka, Higashiyamato-shi, Tokyo 207-0022; Japan
- Coordinates: 35.7329°N 139.4340°E
- Operator: Seibu Railway
- Line: Seibu Haijima Line
- Distance: 28.3 km from Seibu-Shinjuku
- Platforms: 2 side platforms
- Connections

Other information
- Station code: SS32
- Website: Official website

History
- Opened: May 15, 1950
- Former names: Ōmebashi (until 1979)

Passengers
- FY 2019: 25,177 daily

Services
Preceding station	Seibu Railway	Following station
Tamagawa-Jōsui SS33 towards Haijima	Haijima Liner	Ogawa SS31 towards Seibu-Shinjuku
Tamagawa-Jōsui SS33 towards Haijima	Haijima Line Express Semi Express Local	Ogawa SS31 towards Kodaira
Location
- Location within Tokyo Location within Japan

Higashi-Yamatoshi Station (東大和市駅, Higashiyamatoshi-eki) is a passenger railway station located in the city of Higashiyamato, Tokyo, Japan, operated by the private railway operator Seibu Railway.

== Lines ==
Higashi-Yamatoshi Station is served by the Seibu Haijima Line, and is located 5.7 kilometers from the starting point of that line at Kodaira Station.

== Station layout ==
There are two elevated opposed side platforms serving two tracks on the second floor, accessed by stairs, escalators and lifts, with the station building and ticket gates underneath at ground level.

=== Platforms ===
1	Haijima Line	for Haijima
2	Haijima Line	for Hagiyama, Kodaira and Seibu-Shinjuku

== Services ==
Trains run 04:55-00:40 weekdays and 04:55-00:25 weekends. The typical hourly weekday off-peak service is:

- 6 trains calling at all stations to Kodaira, of which:
  - 3 continue as Expresses to Seibu-Shinjuku, calling at all stations to Tanashi, then Kami-Shakujii, Saginomiya, Takadanobaba, and Seibu-Shinjuku
- 6 trains to Tamagawa-Jōsui, of which:
  - 4 continue to Haijima, calling at all stations

Typical journey times are 9 minutes to Kodaira, 12 minutes to Haijima, and 37 minutes to Seibu-Shinjuku on the direct Express trains. The off-peak Local trains to Kodaira connect there to Express trains from Hon-Kawagoe to Seibu-Shinjuku. During the morning and evening rush hours on weekdays, Semi-Express trains run to Seibu-Shinjuku, calling at all stations to Kami-Shakujii, then Saginomiya, Takadanobaba, and Seibu-Shinjuku, with a total journey time of between 37 and 48 minutes.

== History ==
The station opened on May 15, 1950, as Ōmebashi Station (青梅橋駅), named after the intersection outside. It gained its current name on March 25, 1979, and was elevated on July 17, 1980.

Station numbering was introduced on all Seibu Railway lines during fiscal 2012, with Higashi-Yamatoshi Station becoming "SS32".

== Passenger statistics ==
In fiscal 2019, the station was the 42nd busiest on the Seibu network with an average of 25,177 passengers daily.

The passenger figures for previous years are as shown below.

Fiscal year	Daily average
2005	22,516
2010	23,379
2015	25,822

== See also ==
- List of railway stations in Japan
