= 20000 series =

20000 series may refer to:

== Japanese train types ==
- Kintetsu 20000 series "RAKU" EMU
- Odakyu 20000 Series "RSE" EMU
- Nankai 20000 series EMU
- Seibu 20000 series EMU
- Sotetsu 20000 series EMU
- Tobu 20000 series EMU
