= Seibu-Tachikawa Station =

Railway station in Tachikawa, Tokyo, Japan

SS35 Seibu-Tachikawa Station 西武立川駅
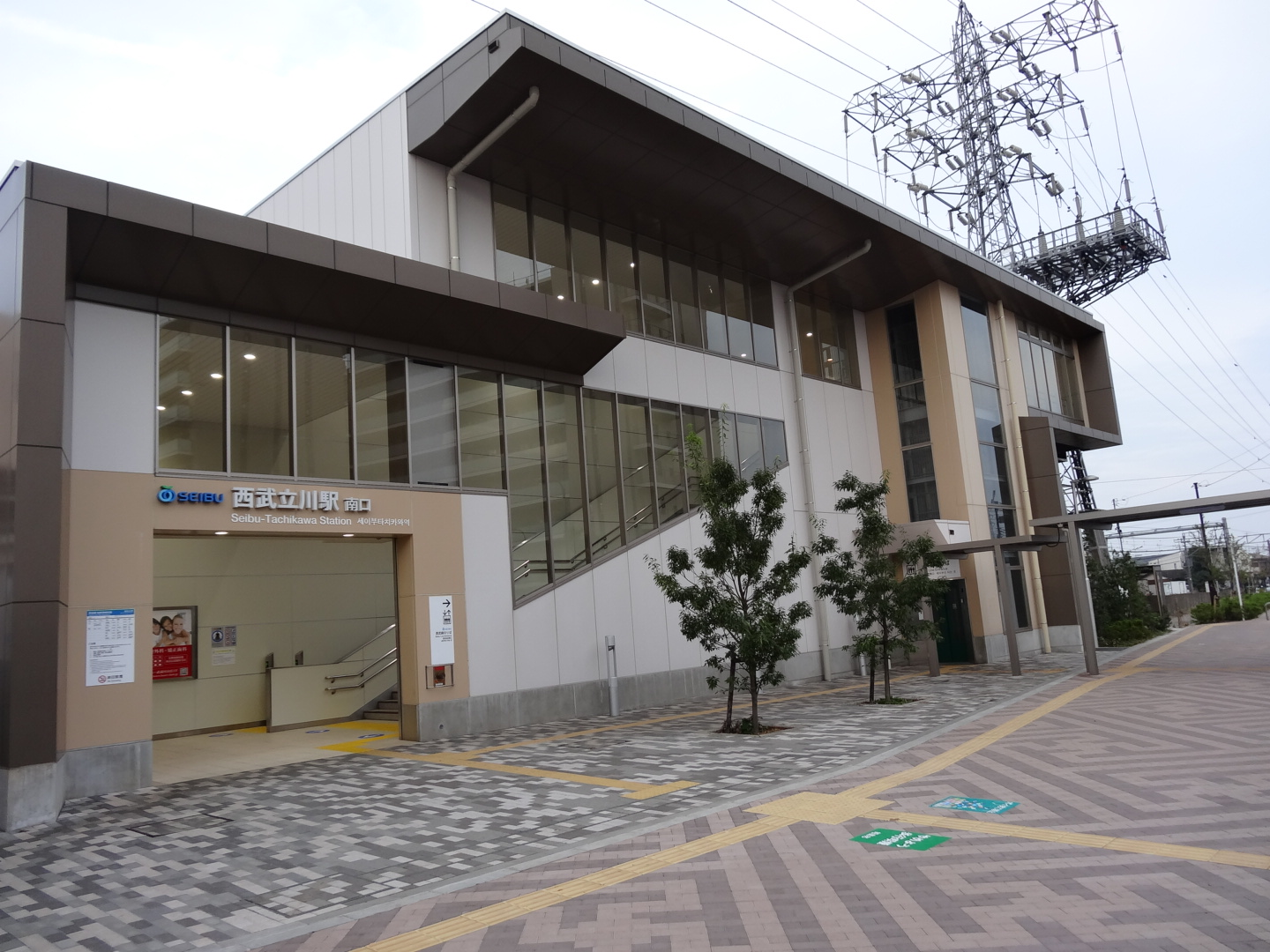
- South exit Seibu-Tachikawa Station, November 2013

General information
- Location: 1-21-2 Nishisuna-cho, Tachikawa-shi, Tokyo-to 190-0034; Japan
- Coordinates: 35.7258°N 139.3699°E
- Operator: Seibu Railway
- Line: Seibu Haijima Line
- Distance: 11.6 km from Kodaira
- Platforms: 1 island platform

Other information
- Station code: SS35
- Website: Official website

History
- Opened: 5 May 1968

Passengers
- FY2019: 11,705 (Daily)

Services
Preceding station	Seibu Railway	Following station
Haijima SS36 Terminus	Haijima Liner	Musashi-Sunagawa SS34 towards Seibu-Shinjuku
Haijima SS36 Terminus	Haijima Line Express Semi Express Local	Musashi-Sunagawa SS34 towards Kodaira
Location
- Location within Tokyo Location within Japan

Seibu-Tachikawa Station (西武立川駅, Seibu-Tachikawa-eki) is a passenger railway station located in the city Tachikawa, Tokyo, Japan, operated by the private railway operator Seibu Railway.

== Lines ==
Seibu-Tachikawa Station is served by the Seibu Haijima Line, and is located 11.6 kilometers from the starting point of that line at Kodaira Station.

== Station layout ==
This station consists of a single ground-level island platform serving two tracks, with an elevated station building located above and perpendicular to the tracks.

=== Platforms ===
1	Seibu Haijima Line	for Haijima
2	Seibu Haijima Line	for Hagiyama, Kodaira, and Seibu-Shinjuku

== History ==
Seibu-Tachikawa Station opened on 5 May 1968.

Station numbering was introduced on all Seibu Railway lines during fiscal 2012, with Seibu-Tachikawa Station becoming "SS35".

== Passenger statistics ==
In fiscal 2019, the station was the 66th busiest on the Seibu network with an average of 11,705 passengers daily.

The passenger figures for previous years are as shown below.

Fiscal year	Daily average
2005	7,372
2010	7,840
2015	10,396

== Surrounding area ==
- Tamagawa Aqueduct

== See also ==
- List of railway stations in Japan
