= Higashi-Akiru Station =

Railway station in Akiruno, Tokyo, Japan

JC82 Higashi-Akiru Station 東秋留駅
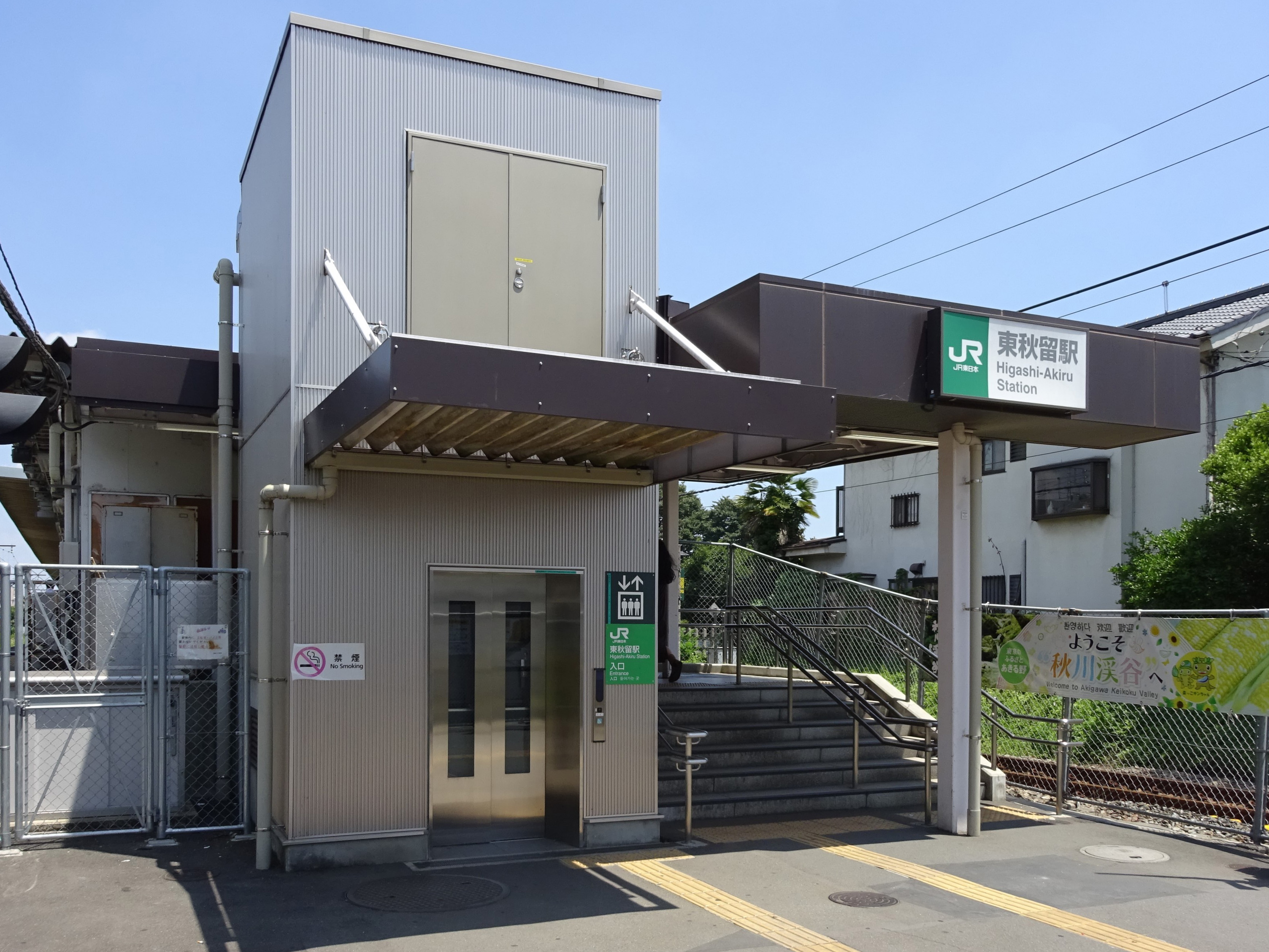
- Higashi-Akiru Station entrance in July 2017

General information
- Location: 458 Nobe, Akiruno-shi, Tokyo 197-0823; Japan
- Coordinates: 35.7261°N 139.3116°E
- Operator: JR East
- Line: Itsukaichi Line
- Distance: 3.5 km from Haijima
- Platforms: 1 island platform
- Tracks: 2

Other information
- Status: Staffed
- Station code: JC82
- Website: Official website

History
- Opened: 21 April 1925

Passengers
- FY2019: 4,593 daily

Services
Preceding station	JR East	Following station
Akigawa JC83 towards Musashi-Itsukaichi	Itsukaichi Line Ōme Special Rapid Rapid Local	Kumagawa JC81 towards Haijima
Location
- Location within Tokyo Location within Japan

Higashi-Akiru Station (東秋留駅, Higashi-Akiru-eki; lit. "East Akiru Station") is a passenger railway station located in the city of Akiruno, Tokyo, Japan, operated by East Japan Railway Company (JR East).

== Lines ==
Higashi-Akiru Station is served by the Itsukaichi Line, and is located 3.5 kilometers from the starting point of the line at Haijima Station.

== Station layout ==
The station consists of a single ground-level island platform serving two tracks, with a small station building. The station is staffed.

=== Platforms ===
1	Itsukaichi Line	for Haijima, Tachikawa, Shinjuku, Tokyo
2	Itsukaichi Line	for Akigawa and Musashi-Itsukaichi

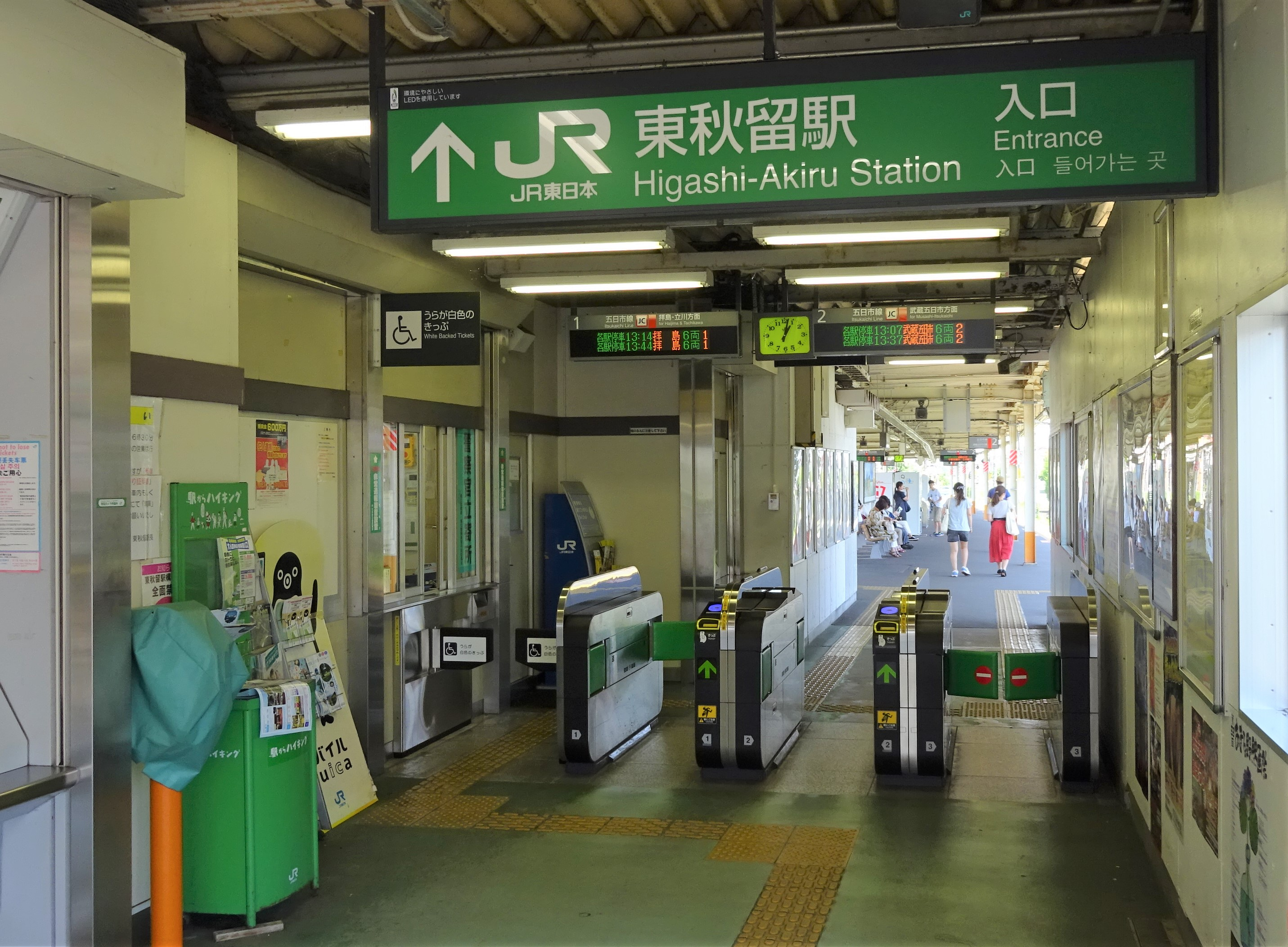
The ticket barriers leading to the platform in July 2017

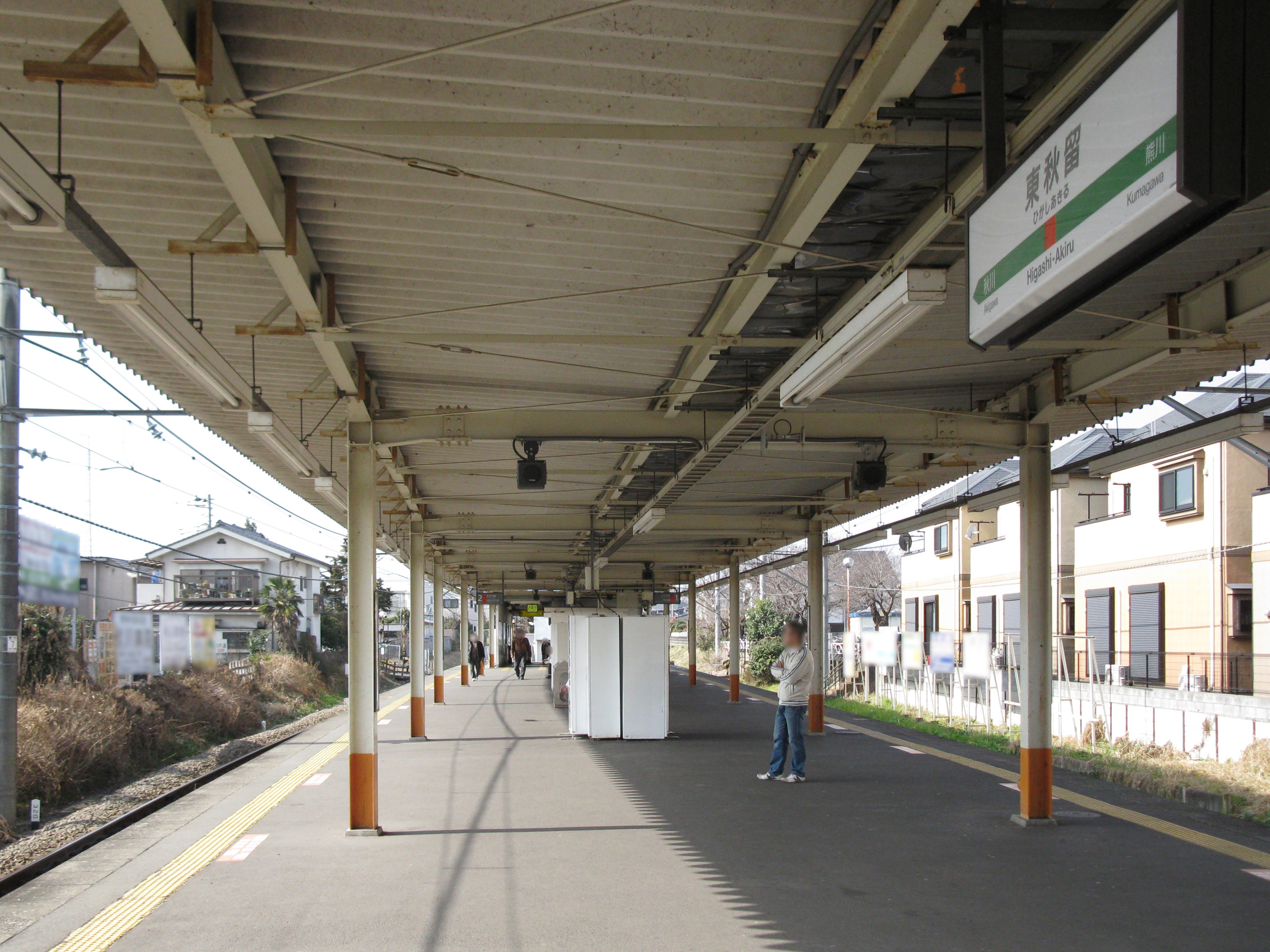
The platform in February 2009

== History ==
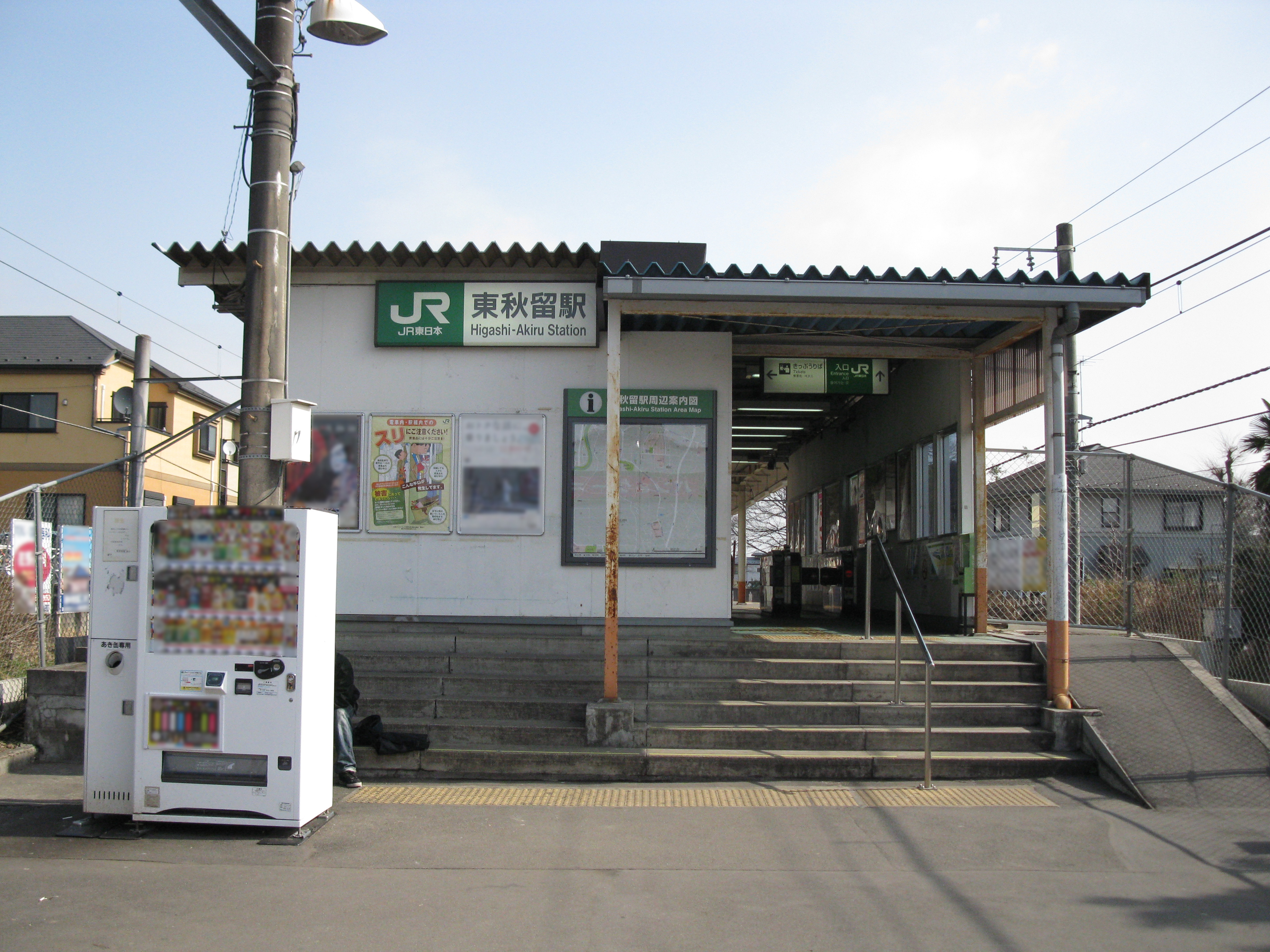
The station entrance in February 2009

The station opened on 21 April 1925. With the privatization of Japanese National Railways (JNR) on 1 April 1987, the station came under the control of JR East.

== Passenger statistics ==
In fiscal 2019, the station was used by an average of 4,593 passengers daily (boarding passengers only).

The passenger figures for previous years are as shown below.

Fiscal year	Daily average
2005	4,944
2010	4,775
2015	4,816

== Surrounding area ==
- Akirudai High School

== See also ==
- List of railway stations in Japan
