= Kumagawa Station =

Railway station in Fussa, Tokyo, Japan

JC81 Kumagawa Station 熊川駅
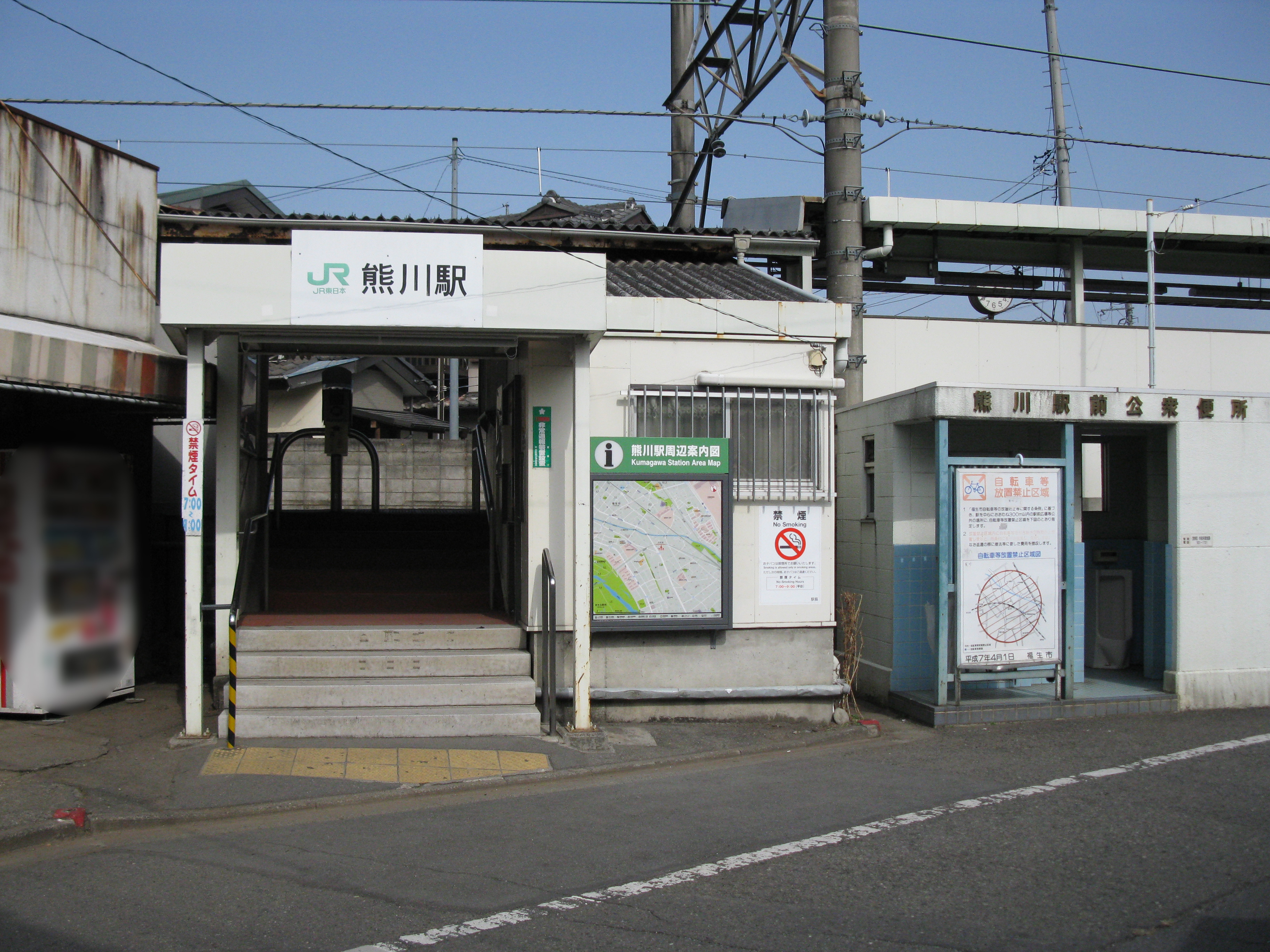
- Kumagawa Station, February 2009

General information
- Location: 738-5 Kumagawa, Fussa-shi, Tokyo197-0003; Japan
- Coordinates: 35.7285°N 139.3360°E
- Operator: JR East
- Line: Itsukaichi Line
- Distance: 1.1 from Haijima
- Platforms: 1 side platform

Other information
- Status: Unstaffed
- Website: Official website

History
- Opened: 30 October 1931

Passengers
- FY2013: 1408

Services
Preceding station	JR East	Following station
Higashi-Akiru JC82 towards Musashi-Itsukaichi	Itsukaichi Line Ōme Special Rapid Rapid Local	Haijima JC55 Terminus
Location
- Location within Tokyo Location within Japan

Kumagawa Station (熊川駅, Kumagawa eki) is a passenger railway station located in the city of Fussa, Tokyo, Japan, operated by East Japan Railway Company (JR East).

== Lines ==
Kumagawa Station is served by the Itsukaichi Line, and is located 1.1 kilometers from the starting point of the line at Haijima Station.

== Station layout ==
This station consists of a single side platform serving a single bi-directional track, connected to the station building by a footbridge. The station is unattended.

=== Platform ===
/	Itsukaichi Line	for Akigawa and Musashi-Itsukaichi for Haijima, Tachikawa, Shinjuku, Tokyo

== History ==
The station opened as a temporary stop on 28 May 1931, and was upgraded to a full passenger station on 30 October 1931. With the privatization of Japanese National Railways (JNR) on 1 April 1987, the station came under the control of JR East.

== Passenger statistics ==
In fiscal 2010, the station was used by an average of 1,477 passengers daily (boarding passengers only).

== Surrounding area ==
- Kumagawa Post Office
- Kumagaya Jinja

== See also ==
- List of railway stations in Japan
