= Seibu Haijima Line =

Railway line in Tokyo, Japan

Haijima Line
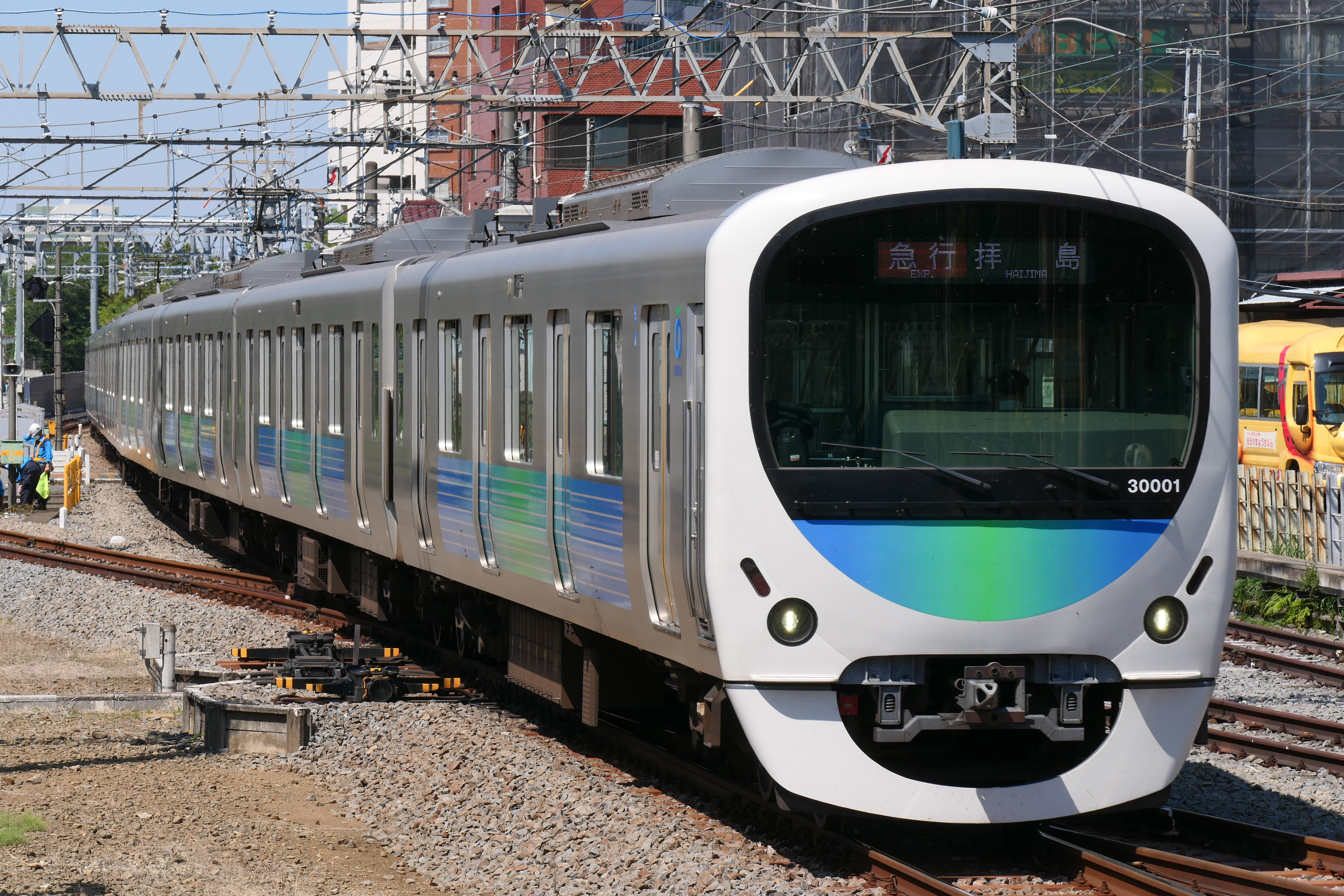
- Express Service train at Ogawa Station

Overview
- Native name: 拝島線
- Owner: Seibu Railway
- Locale: Kanto region
- Termini: Kodaira; Haijima
- Stations: 8

Service
- Type: Commuter rail

History
- Opened: 2 November 1928; 97 years ago

Technical
- Line length: 14.3 km (8.9 mi)
- Number of tracks: 2 (Single-tracked: from Tamagawa-Jōsui to Musashi-Sunagawa, from Seibu-Tachikawa to Haijima)
- Track gauge: 1,067 mm (3 ft 6 in)
- Electrification: 1,500 V DC, overhead catenary
- Operating speed: 110 km/h (70 mph)

The Haijima Line (拝島線, Haijima-sen) is a railway line in Tokyo, Japan, operated by Seibu Railway. It acts as a branch line of the Shinjuku Line, with direct trains to Seibu-Shinjuku Station in Tokyo.

== Haijima Liner ==
Haijima Liner is a reserved seat express service between Haijima and Seibu-Shinjuku. The service commenced in Spring 2018 using the Seibu 40000 series trainsets.

As of 16 March 2024, inbound services operate only on weekday mornings, stopping at all stations between Haijima and Kodaira, then operate non-stop to Takadanobaba and Seibu-Shinjuku. There are 3 trips with running time between 44 and 50 minutes.

Outbound services operate every day including weekends and public holidays. From Seibu-Shinjuku trains stop at Takadanobaba, then non-stop to Kodaira, then all stations to Haijima. Trains depart Seibu-Shinjuku hourly between 17:15 and 22:15, with running time between 44 and 49 minutes.

As well as a regular fare ticket, a reserved seat ticket is required at a cost of 510 yen (260 yen for children under 12years old).

== Stations ==
O: stop
SE: Semi Express (準急, Junkyū)
E: Express (急行, Kyūkō)
HL: Haijima Liner (拝島ライナー, Haijima Rainā)

All trains on this line stop at every station.

No.	Station	Japanese	Distance (km)	SE	E	HL	Transfers	Location
	Kodaira	小平	0.0	O	O	O	Shinjuku Line (SS19; Direct service to Seibu-Shinjuku)	Kodaira
	Hagiyama	萩山	1.1	O	O	O	Tamako Line (ST04; Limited direct service from Tamako to Seibu-Shinjuku)	Higashimurayama
	Ogawa	小川	2.7	O	O	O	Kokubunji Line (SK04)	Kodaira
	Higashi-Yamatoshi	東大和市	5.7	O	O	O		Higashiyamato
	Tamagawa-Jōsui	玉川上水	7.2	O	O	O	Tama Toshi Monorail Line (TT17)	Tachikawa
	Musashi-Sunagawa	武蔵砂川	9.6	O	O	O		Tachikawa
	Seibu-Tachikawa	西武立川	11.6	O	O	O		Tachikawa
	Haijima	拝島	14.3	O	O	O	Ōme Line (JC55); Itsukaichi Line (JC55); ■ Hachikō Line	Akishima

== Rolling stock ==
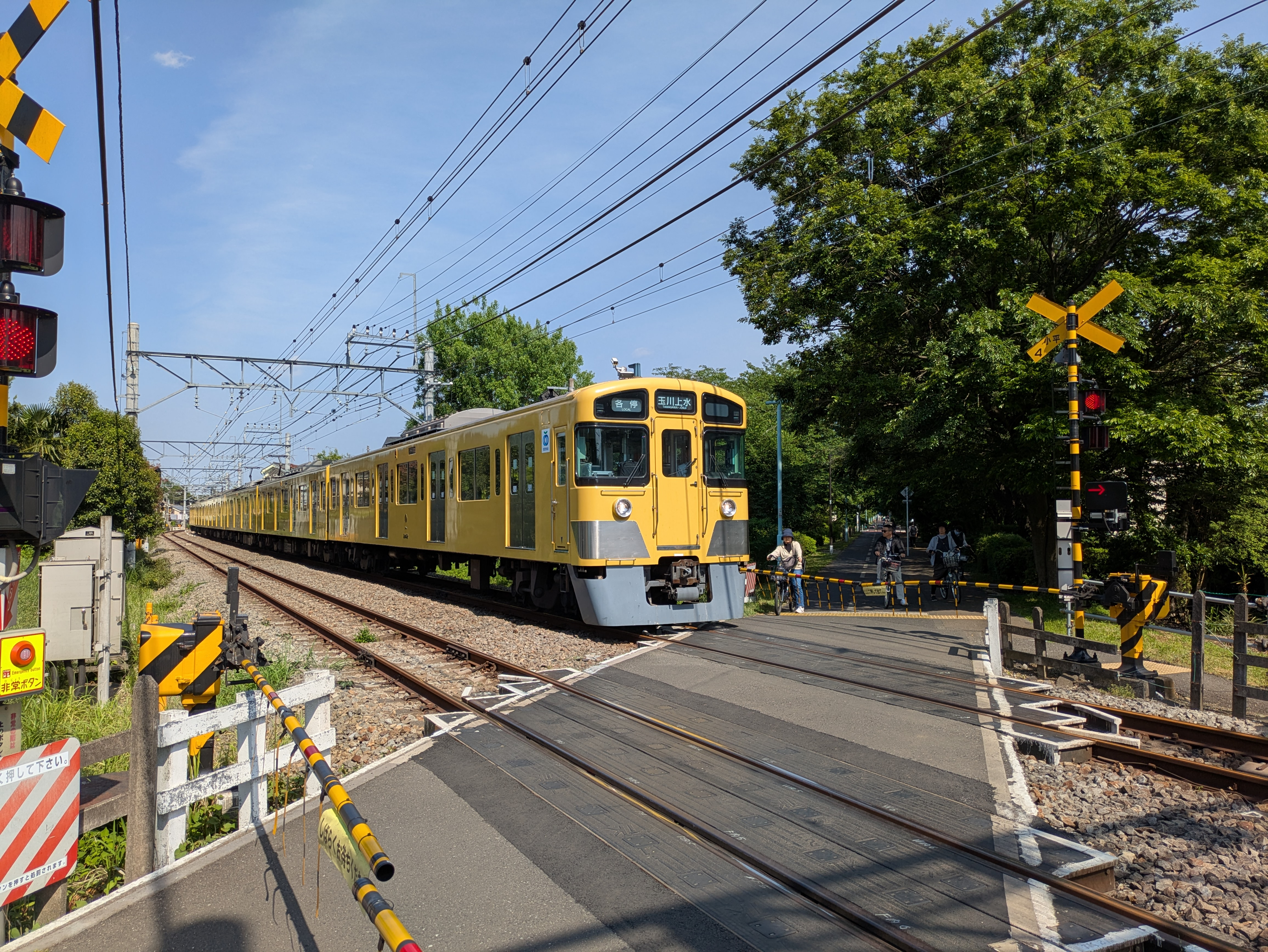
2000series（2025）

- Seibu 2000 series
- Seibu 6000 series
- Seibu 20000 series
- Seibu 30000 series
- Seibu 40000 series

== History ==
- 2 November 1928: Opened as Tamako Railway from Hagiyama to Moto-Kodaira (near Kodaira).
- 15 August 1932: Electrified at 600 V DC from Hagiyama to Moto-Kodaira.
- 12 March 1940: Tamako Railway merged with Musashino Railway (present-day Seibu Railway).
- 15 November 1949: Moto-Kodaira Station merged into Kodaira Station.
- 15 May 1950: Jōsui Line opened from Ogawa to Tamagawa-Jōsui. Omebashi and Tamagawa-Jōsui stations opened.
- 12 October 1954: Electrified at 1,500 V DC from Ogawa to Tamagawa-Jōsui.
- 18 March 1955: Electrification raised to 1,500 V DC between Kodaira and Hagiyama.
- 1 September 1962: Josui Line opened from Hagiyama to Ogawa. Renamed Jōsui Line from Kodaira to Hagiyama.
- 7 November 1967: Double-tracked from Kodaira to Hagiyama.
- 15 May 1968: Haijima Line opened from Tamagawa-Jōsui to Haijima, Seibu-Tachikawa station opened. Jōsui Line renamed Haijima Line.
- 25 March 1979: Omebashi Station renamed Higashi-Yamatoshi Station.
- 7 December 1979: Double-tracked from Hagiyama to Ogawa.
- 12 December 1983: Musashi-Sunagawa Station opened.
- 1 December 1983: Double-tracked from Musashi-Sunagawa to Seibu-Tachikawa.
- 5 March 1987: Nishi-Ogawa passing loop opened. Double-tracked from Nishi-Ogawa to Higashi-Yamatoshi.
- 2 November 1988: Double-tracked from Higashi-Yamatoshi to Tamagawa-Jōsui.
- 29 March 1991: Double-tracked from Ogawa to Nishi-Ogawa, Nishi-Ogawa passing loop abolished.
- 14 June 2008: Haijima Rapid service started. The service stopped at: Kodaira, Tamagawa-Jōsui, Musashi-Sunagawa, Seibu-Tachikawa and Haijima stations.
- 30 June 2012: Haijima Rapid service abolished.
