= Kintetsu 20000 series =

Japanese train type

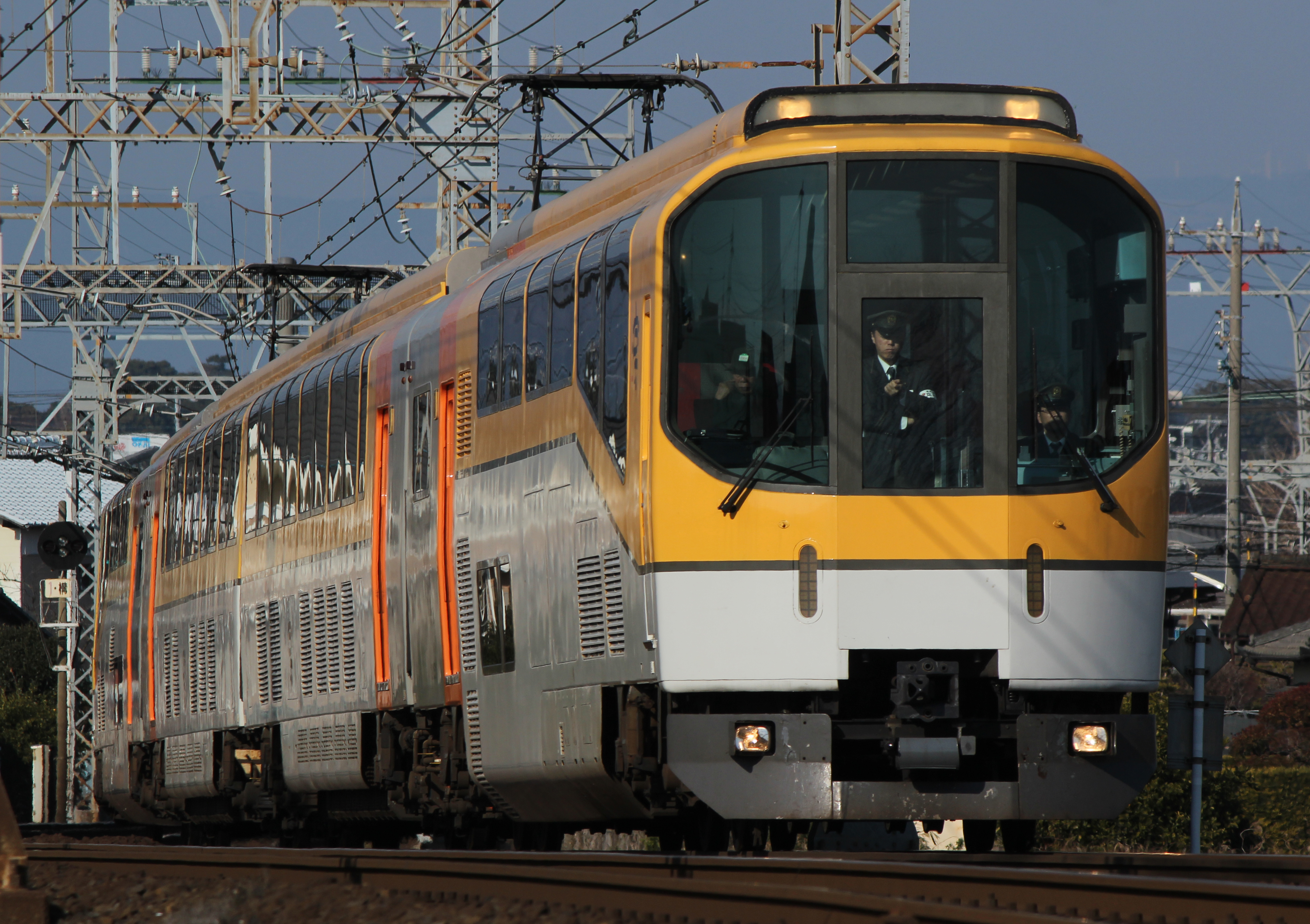
- The 20000 series original livery in 2014
- In service: 1990 – Present
- Manufacturer: Kinki Sharyo
- Family name: Vista Car; RAKU
- Replaced: 20100 series
- Entered service: 23 November 1990
- Refurbished: 2020
- Number built: 4 vehicles (1 set)
- Number in service: 4 vehicles (1 set)
- Formation: 4 cars per trainset
- Fleet numbers: PL01
- Operators: Kintetsu Railway

Specifications
- Car length: 20,720 mm (68 ft 0 in); 20,960 mm (68 ft 9 in)
- Width: 2,800 mm (9 ft 2 in)
- Height: 4,150 mm (13 ft 7 in)
- Traction system: Resistor control
- Electric system(s): 1,500 V DC, overhead lines
- Current collection: Pantograph
- Bogies: KD100, KD100A
- Track gauge: 1,435 mm (4 ft 8 1/2 in)

The Kintetsu 20000 series (近鉄20000系) is an electric multiple unit (EMU) train type operated on excursion services by Kintetsu Railway in Japan.

== Formation ==
The train is formed as follows, consisting of four cars.

Designation	Ku 20151	Mo 20251	Mo 20201	Ku 20101

== History ==
The 20000 series train was built in 1990. It underwent refurbishment, which included a new livery. Trial operation with the refurbished set began in August 2020.

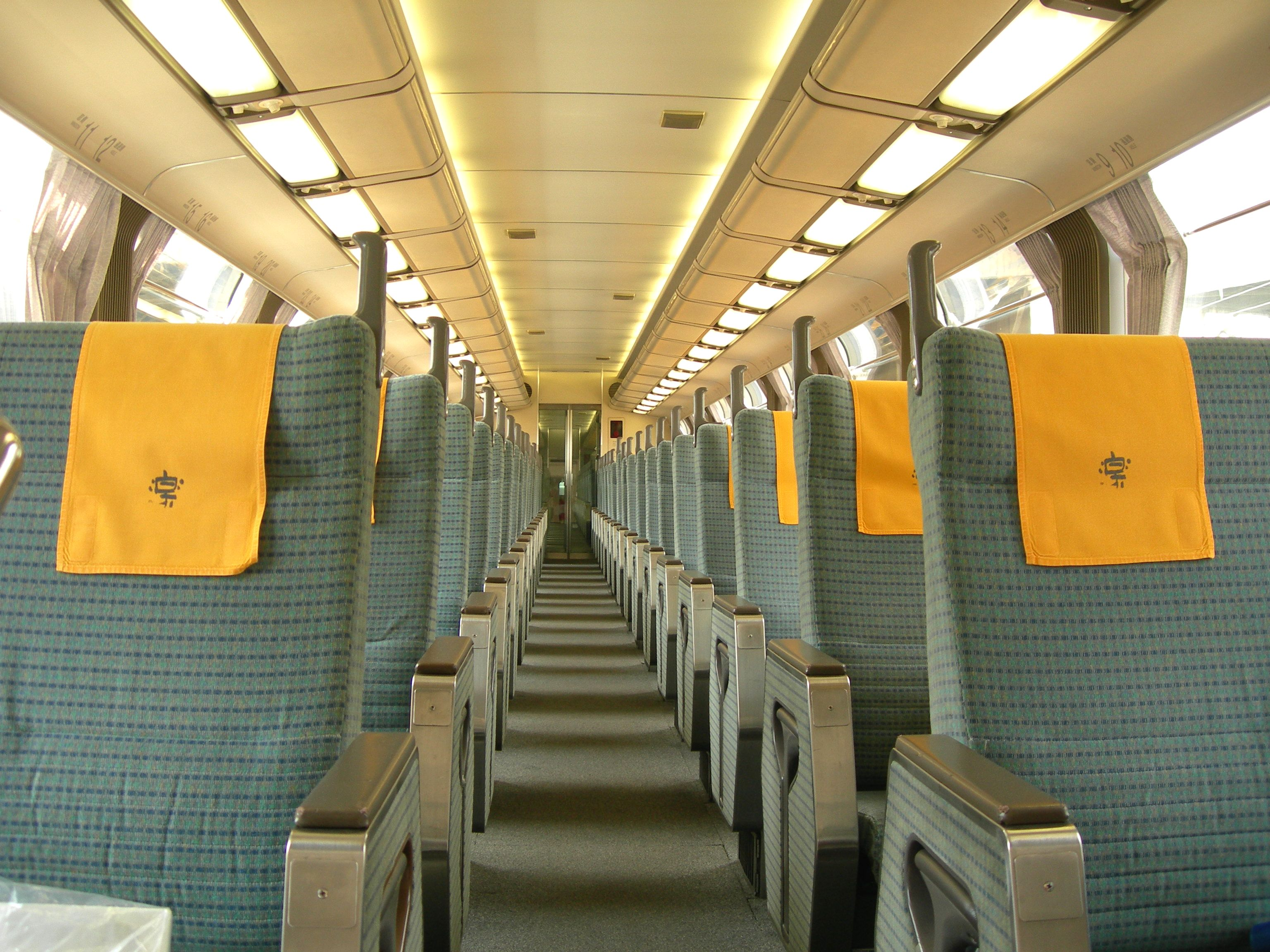
Interior

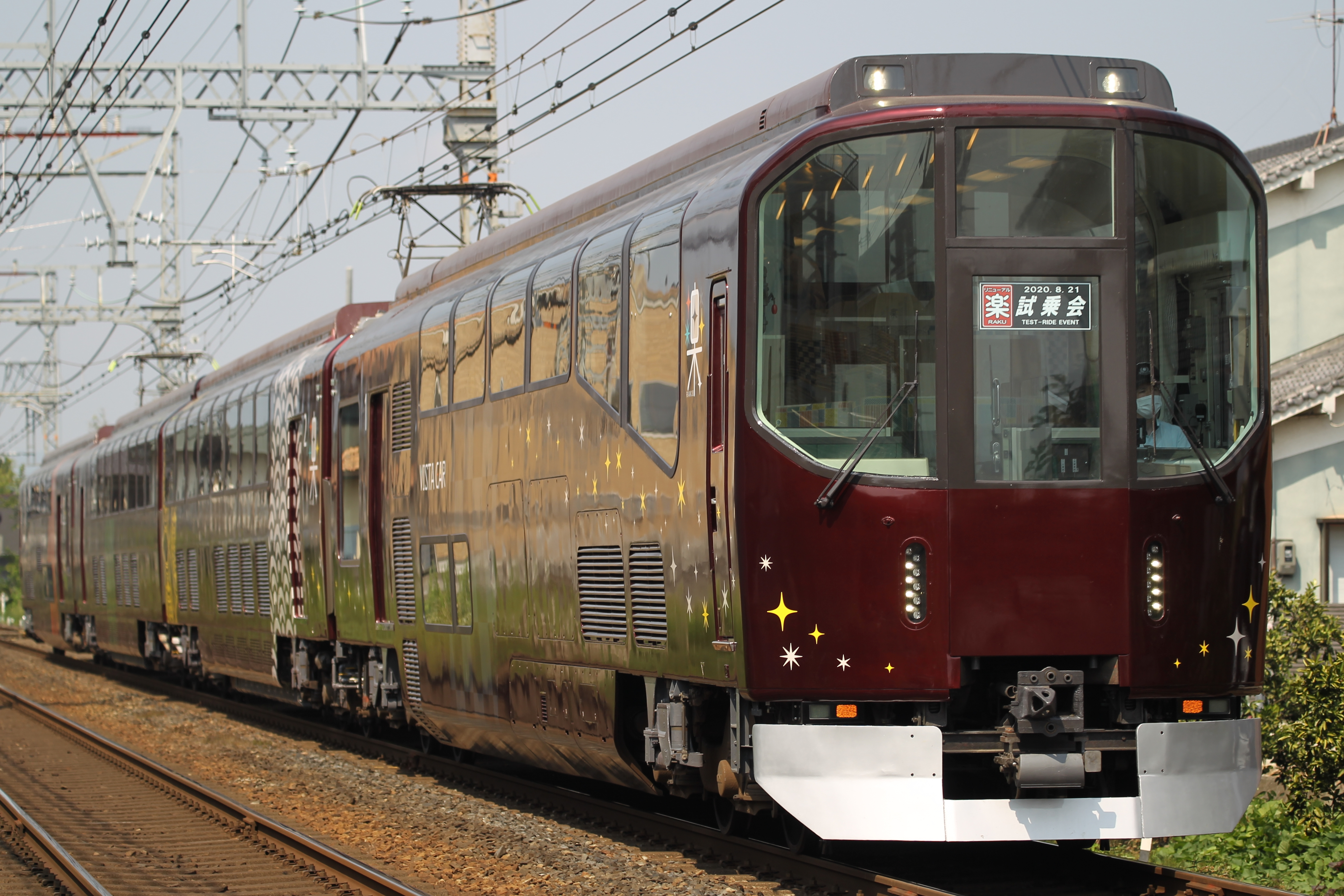
Refurbished 20000 series train in August 2020
