= Seibu 20000 series =

Electric multiple unit train type operated by Seibu Railway in Japan

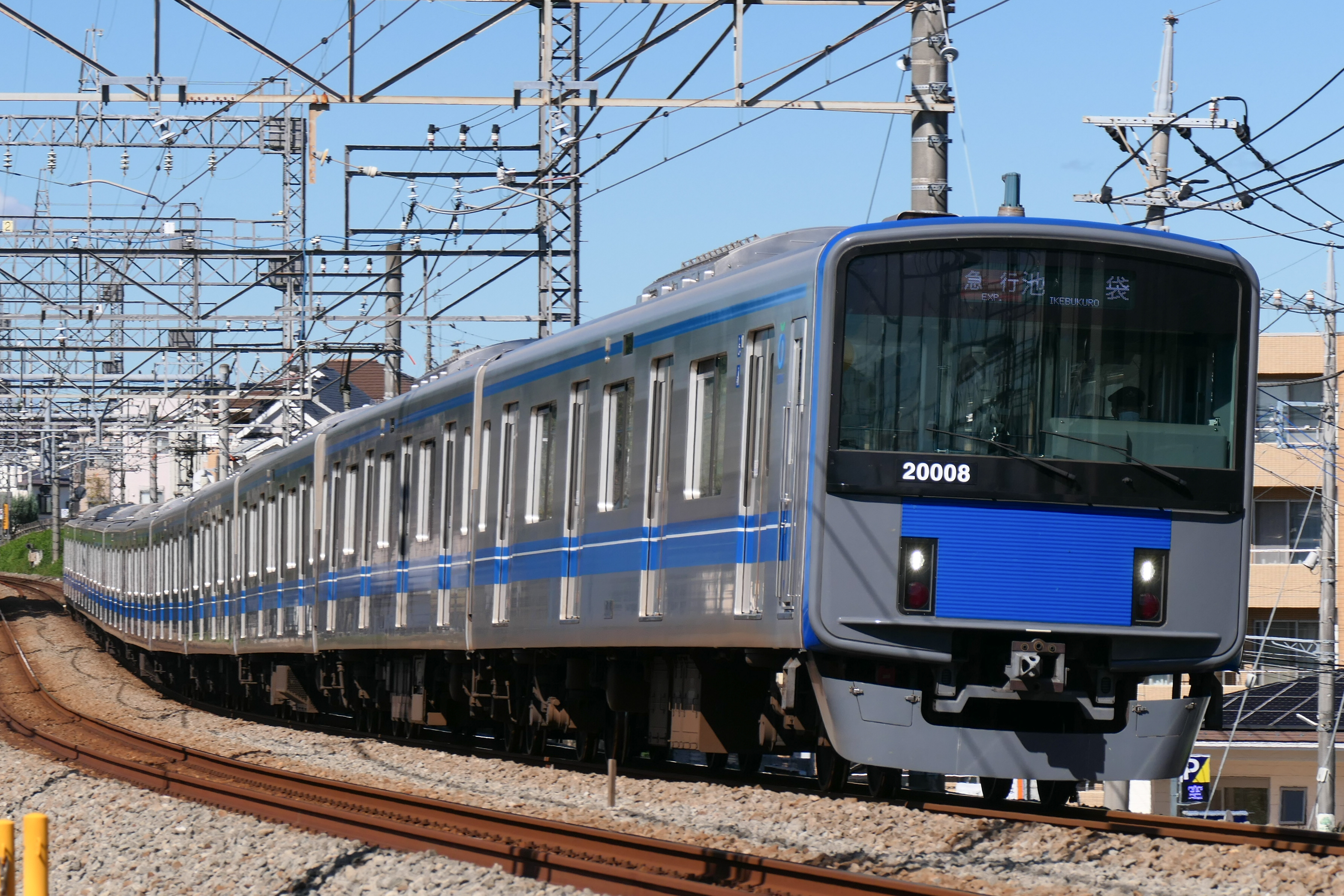
- 10-car set 20108 on the Seibu Ikebukuro Line in October 2021
- In service: 2000–present
- Manufacturer: Hitachi
- Built at: Kudamatsu, Yamaguchi
- Family name: Hitachi A-train
- Constructed: 1999–2005
- Entered service: 2000
- Number built: 144 vehicles (16 sets)
- Number in service: 144 vehicles (16 sets)
- Formation: 8/10 cars per trainset
- Fleet numbers: 20101–20108; 20151–20158
- Operator: Seibu Railway
- Depots: Kotesashi, Minami-Iriso, Musashigaoka, Tamagawa-Josui
- Lines served: Seibu Ikebukuro Line; Seibu Sayama Line; Seibu Shinjuku Line; Seibu Haijima Line

Specifications
- Car body construction: Aluminium
- Car length: 20,000 mm (65 ft 7 in)
- Doors: 4 pairs per side
- Maximum speed: 105 km/h (65 mph)
- Traction system: Variable frequency (IGBT)
- Electric system: 1,500 V DC
- Current collection: overhead catenary
- Track gauge: 1,067 mm (3 ft 6 in)

The Seibu 20000 series (西武20000系) is an electric multiple unit (EMU) train type operated by the private railway operator Seibu Railway on commuter services in the Tokyo area of Japan. First introduced in 2000, a total of eight 10-car sets and eight 8-car sets were built between 1999 and 2005 by Hitachi for use on Seibu Ikebukuro Line and Seibu Shinjuku Line services.

== Fleet ==
As of 1 April 2017, the fleet consists of eight ten-car sets and eight eight-car (20050 series) sets, based at Kotesashi, Minami-Iriso, Musashigaoka, and Tamagawa-Josui depots for use on Seibu Shinjuku Line and Seibu Ikebukuro Line services.

== Formations ==
=== 8-car sets ===
The eight-car sets (20151 to 20158) are formed as shown below with four motored (M) cars and four unpowered trailer (T) cars, and car 8 at the Shinjuku/Ikebukuro end.

Car No.	1	2	3	4	5	6	7	8
Designation	Tc1	M1	M2	T1	T3	M5	M6	Tc2
Numbering	2015x	2025x	2035x	2045x	2075x	2085x	2095x	2005x

The M1 and M5 cars are each equipped with one single-arm pantograph.

=== 10-car sets ===
The eight ten-car sets (20101 to 20108) are formed as shown below with five motored (M) cars and five unpowered trailer (T) cars, and car 10 at the Shinjuku/Ikebukuro end.

Car No.	1	2	3	4	5	6	7	8	9	10
Designation	Tc1	M1	M2	T1	M3	T2	T3	M5	M6	Tc2
Numbering	2010x	2020x	2030x	2040x	2050x	2060x	2070x	2080x	2090x	2000x

The M1, M3, and M5 cars are each equipped with one single-arm pantograph.

== Interior ==
Seating consists of sculpted longitudinal bench seating throughout, with an individual seat width of 460 mm (18 in) per person. Wheelchair spaces are provided in the two outermost cars at each end. Priority seats are provided at the end of each car. Scrolling LED passenger information displays are provided above the doorways.

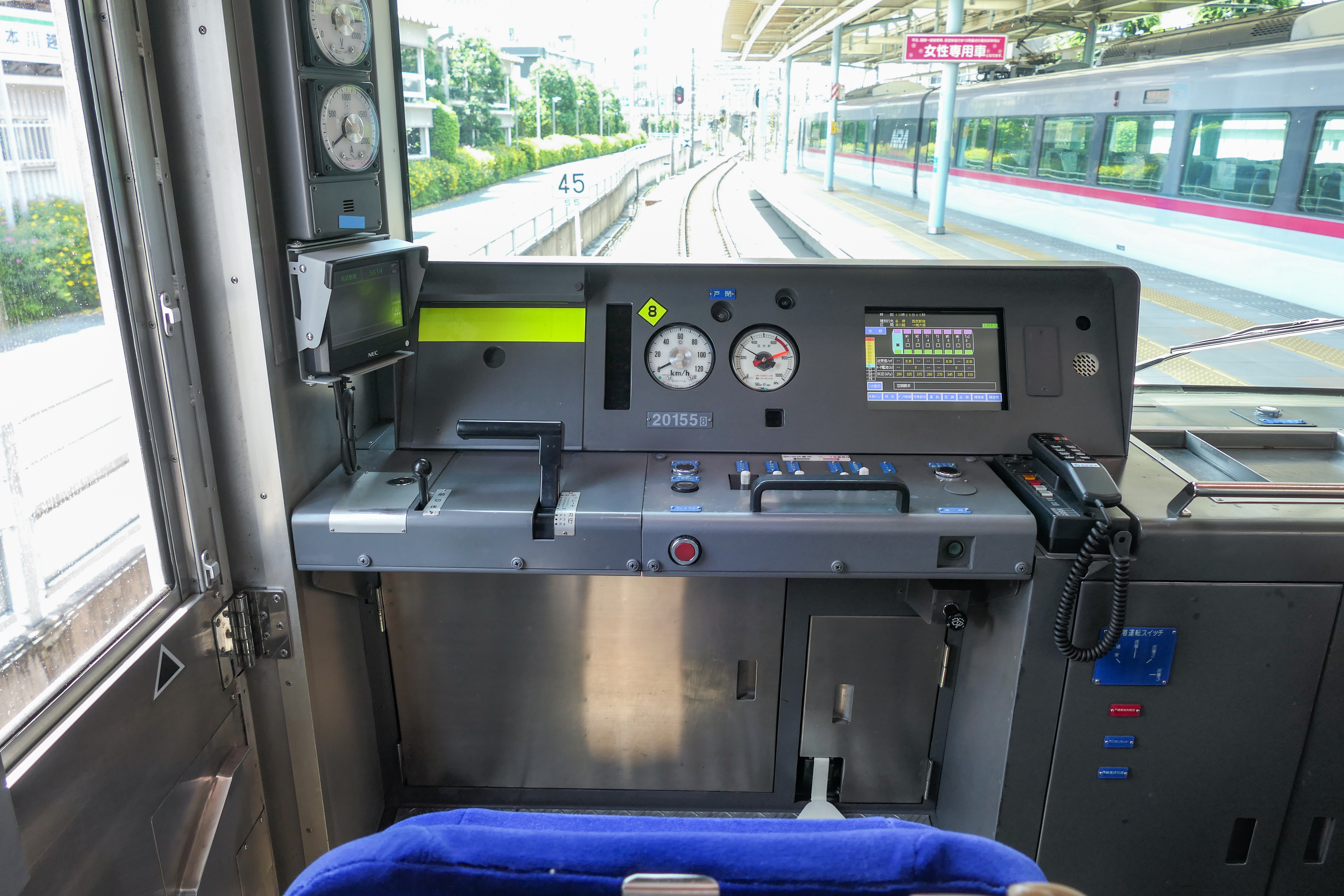
Driver's cab (8-car set)

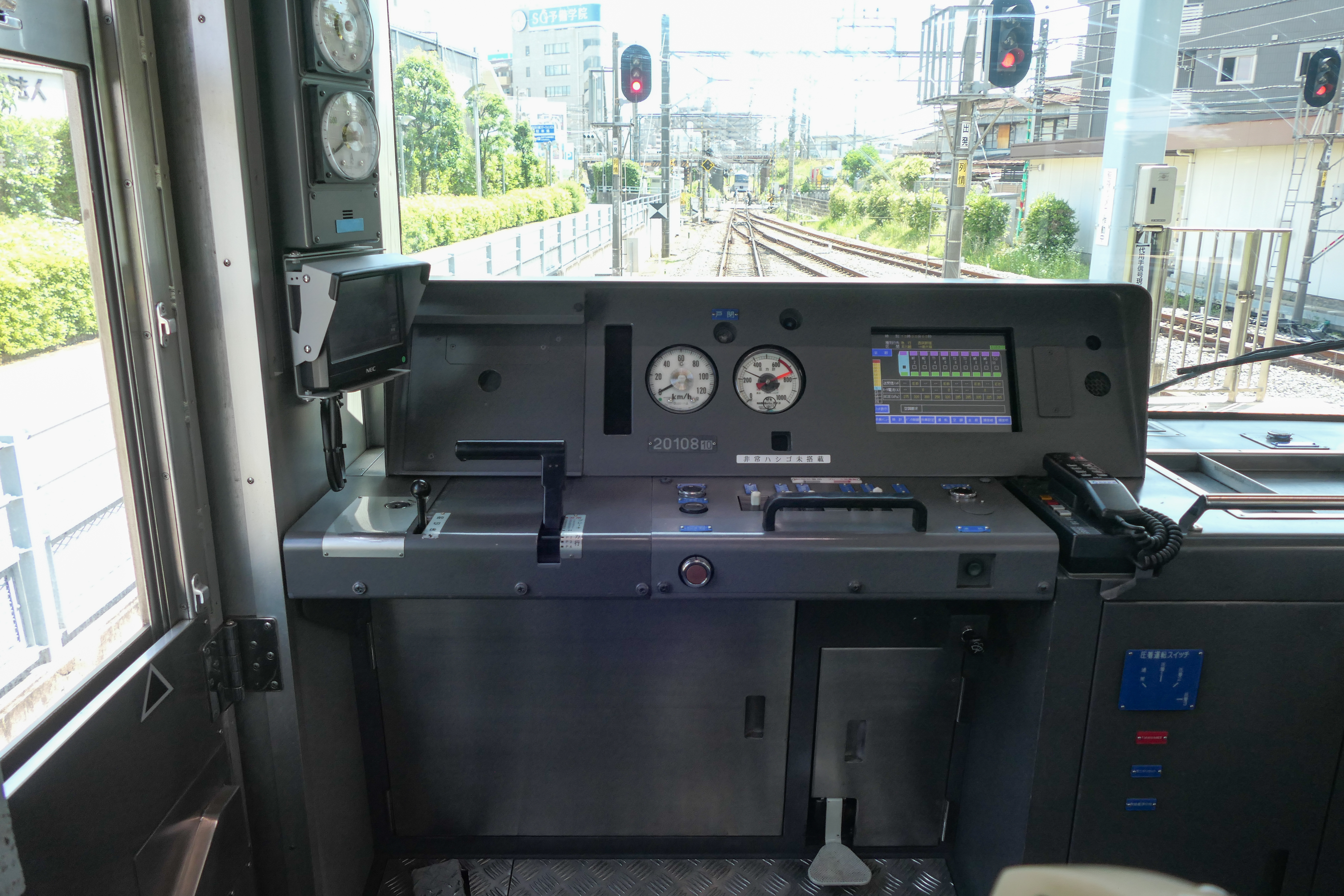
Driver's cab (10-car set)

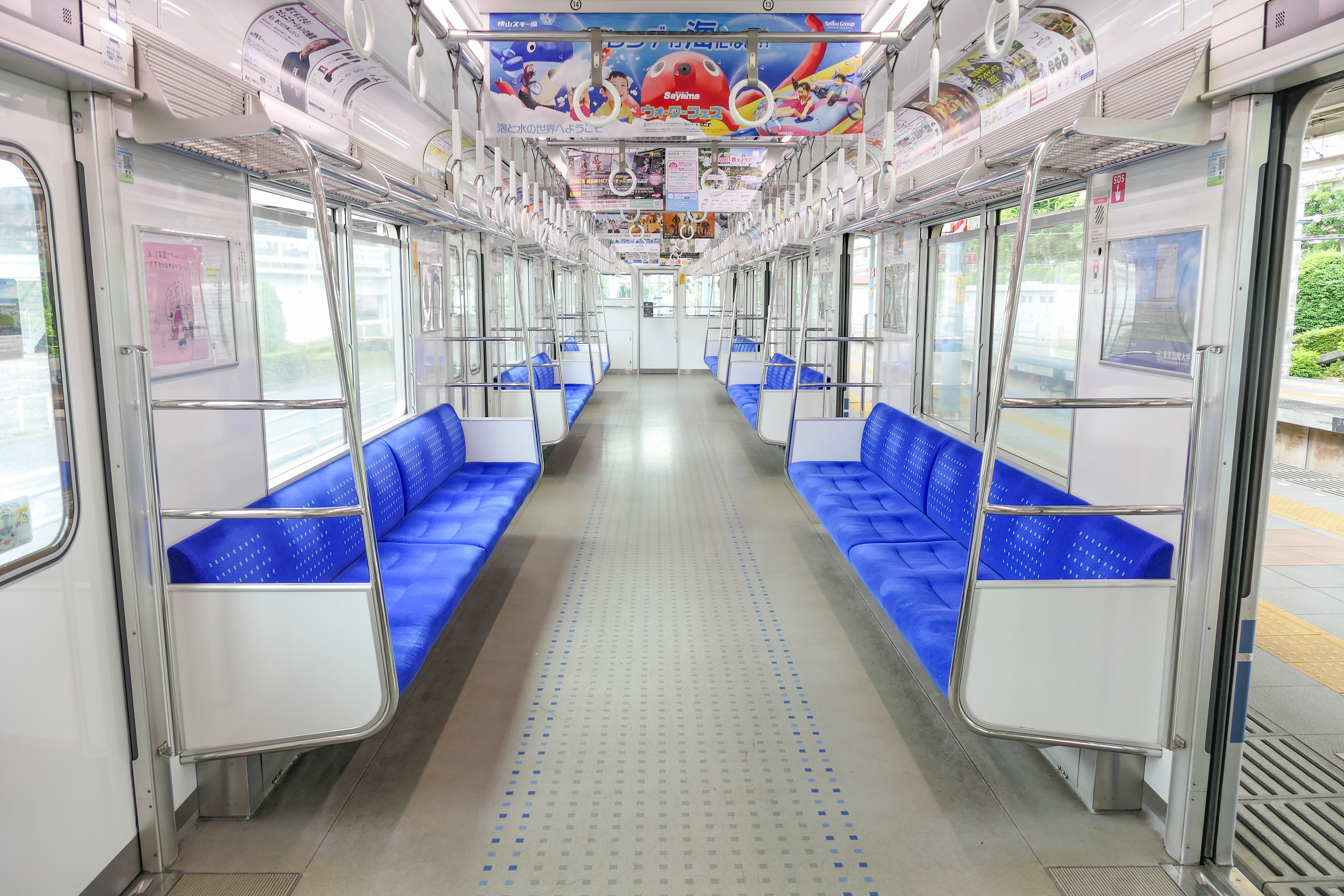
Interior view (Set 20154)

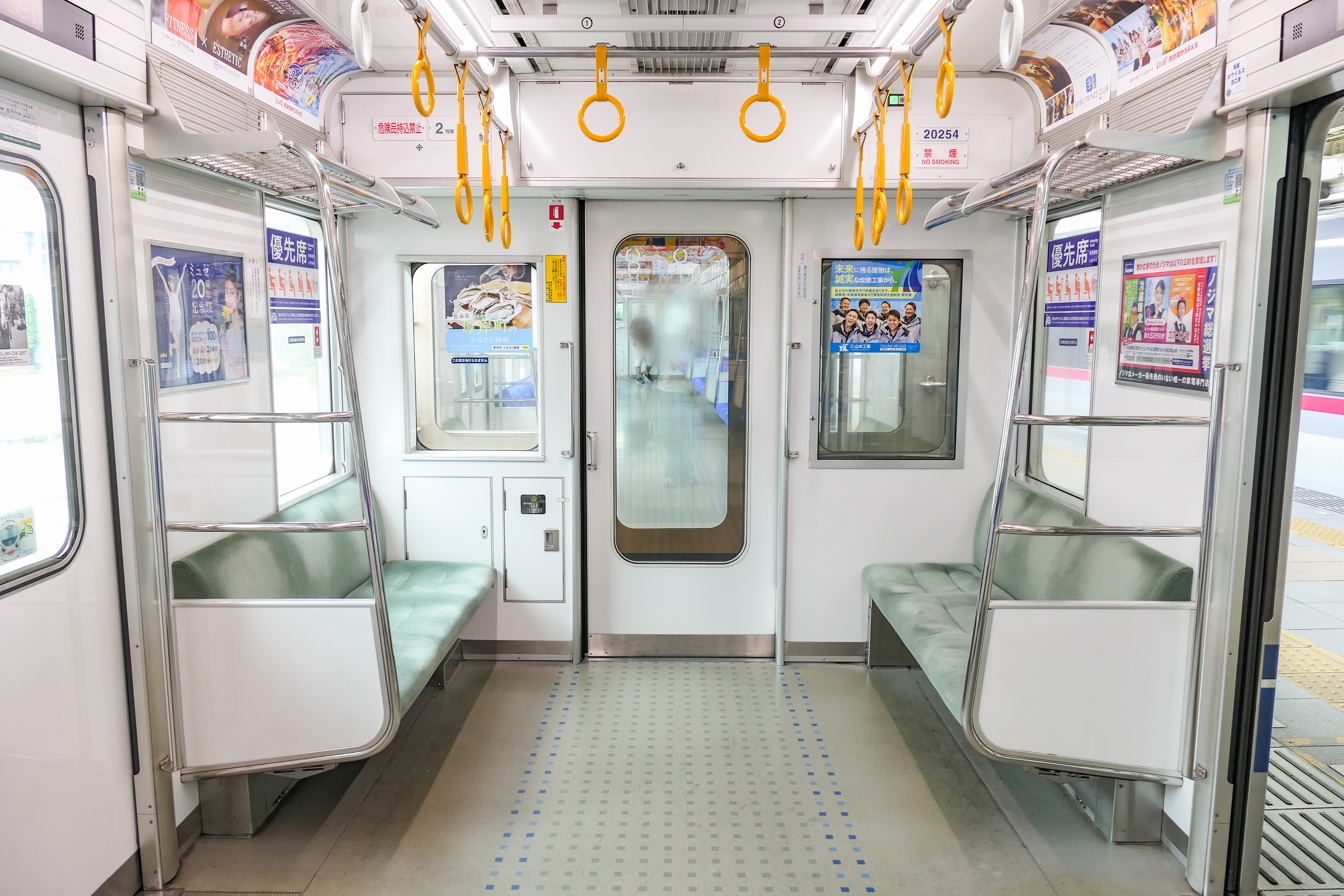
Priority seating (Set 20154)

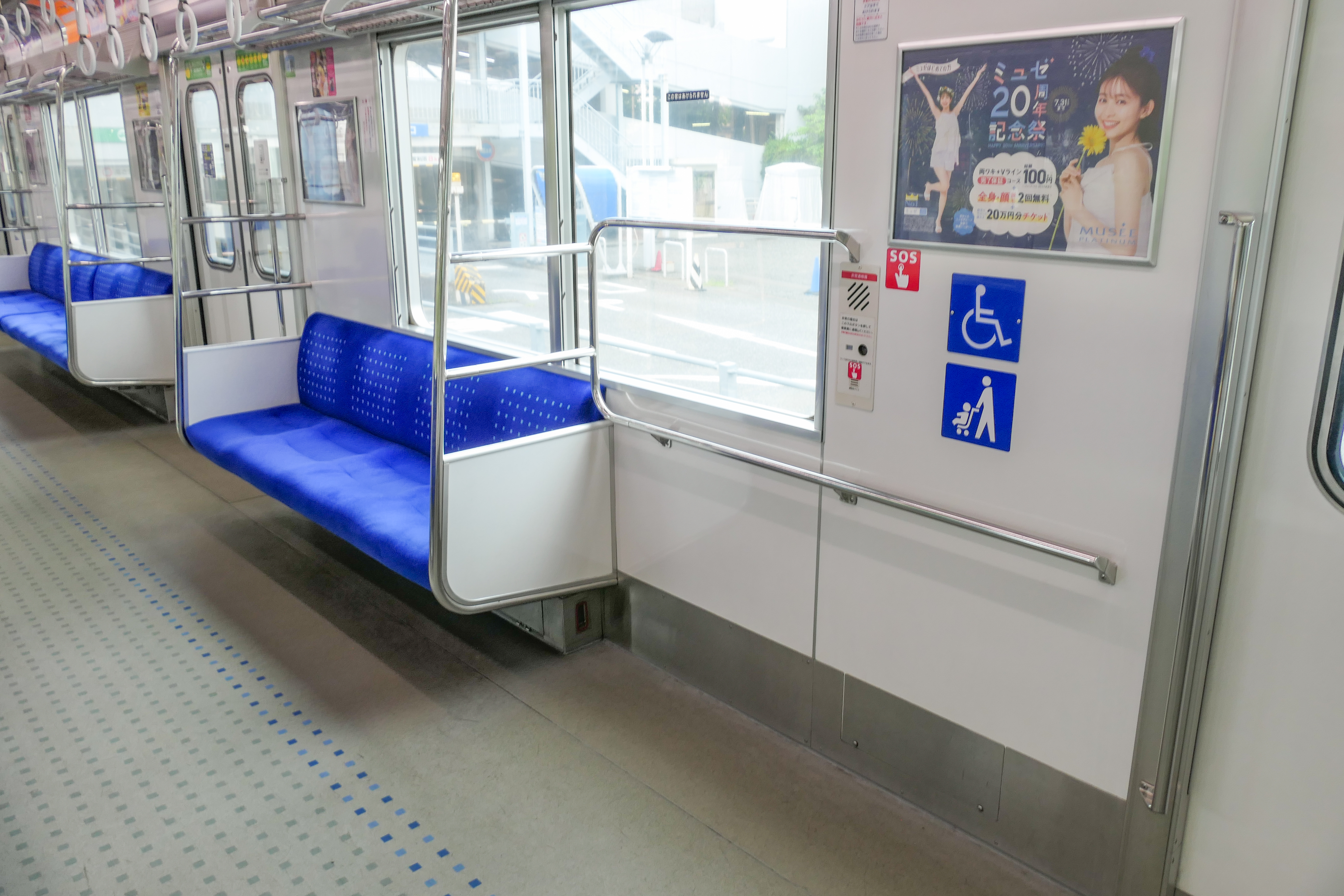
Wheelchair space (Set 20154)

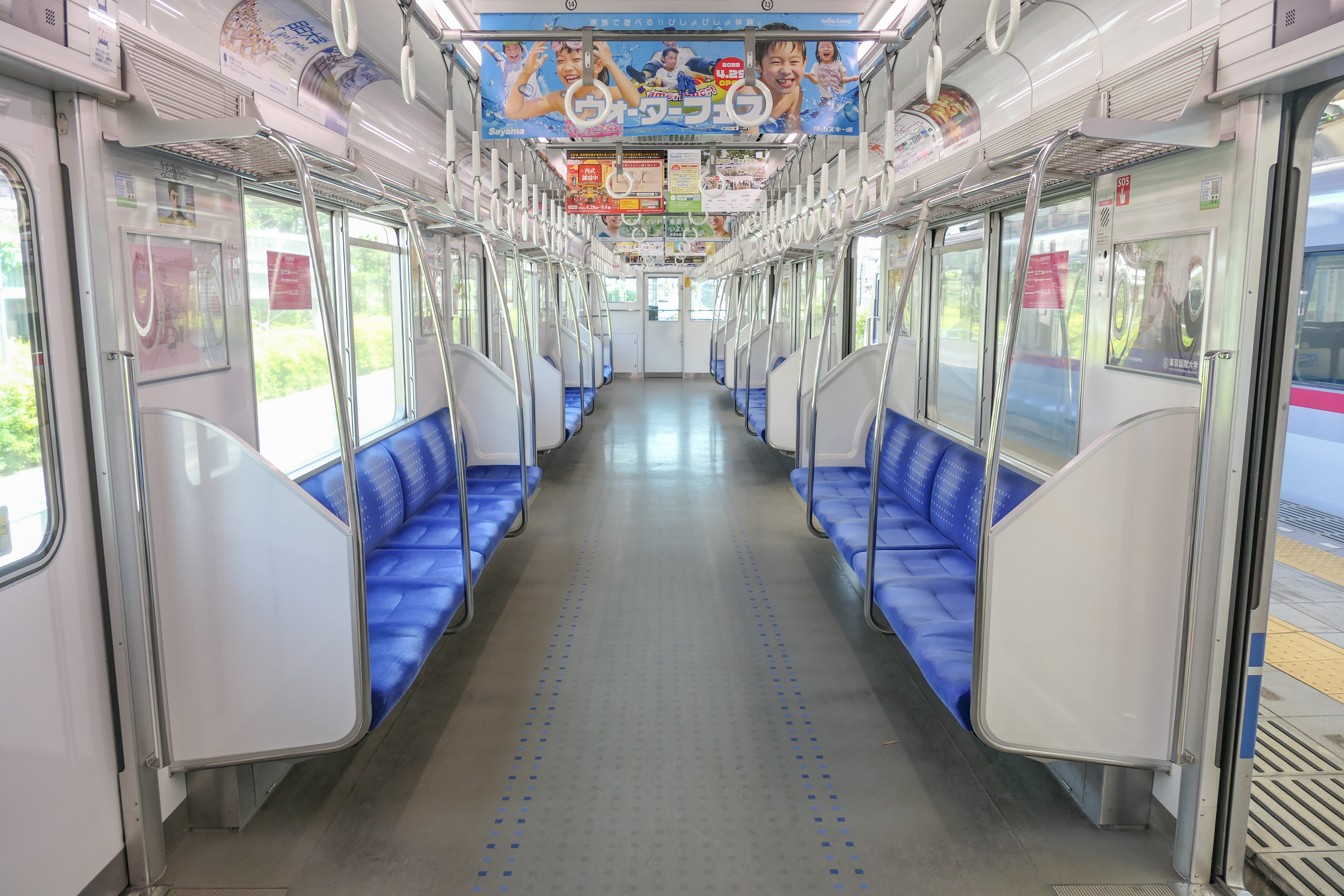
Interior view (Set 20108)

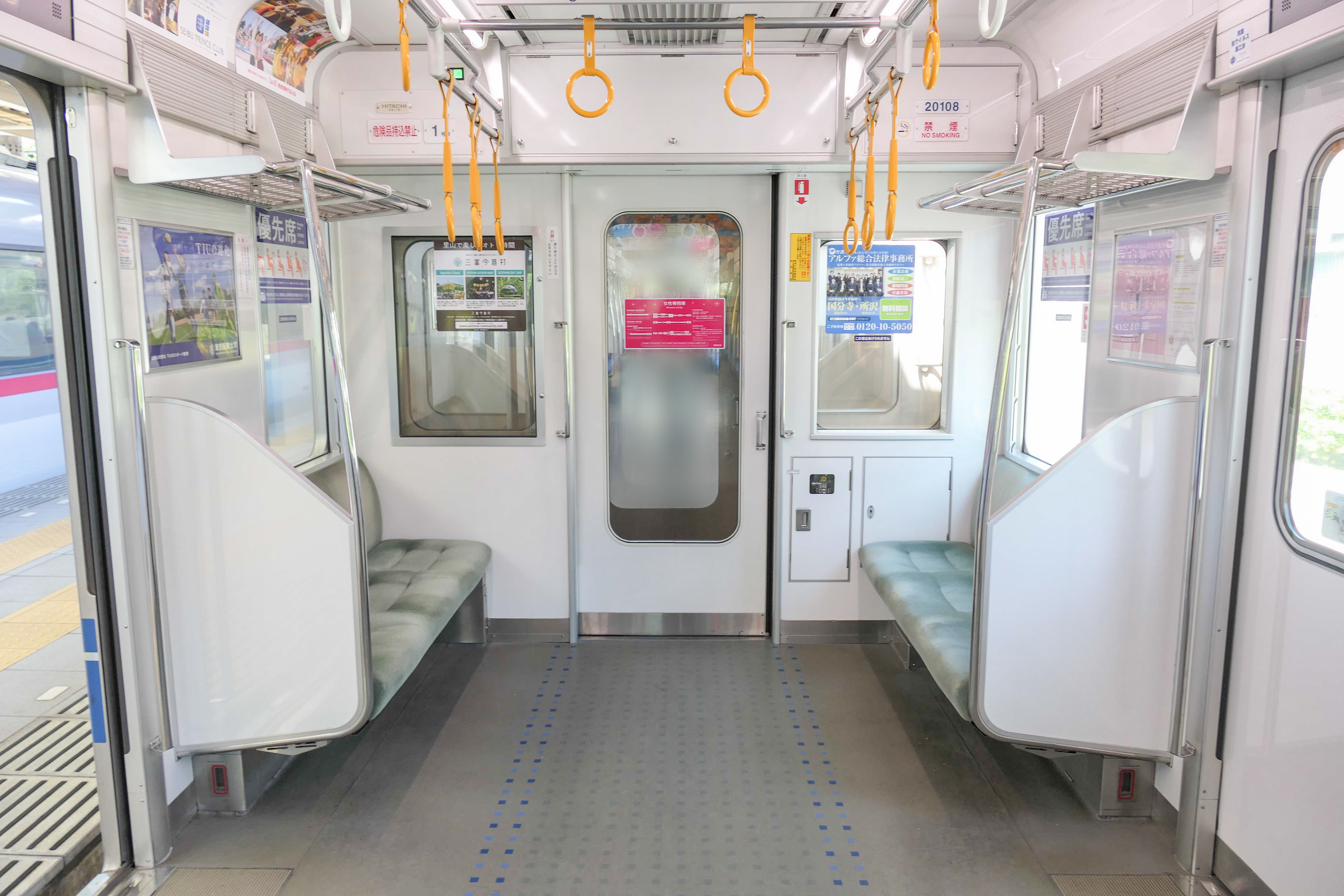
Priority seating (Set 20108)

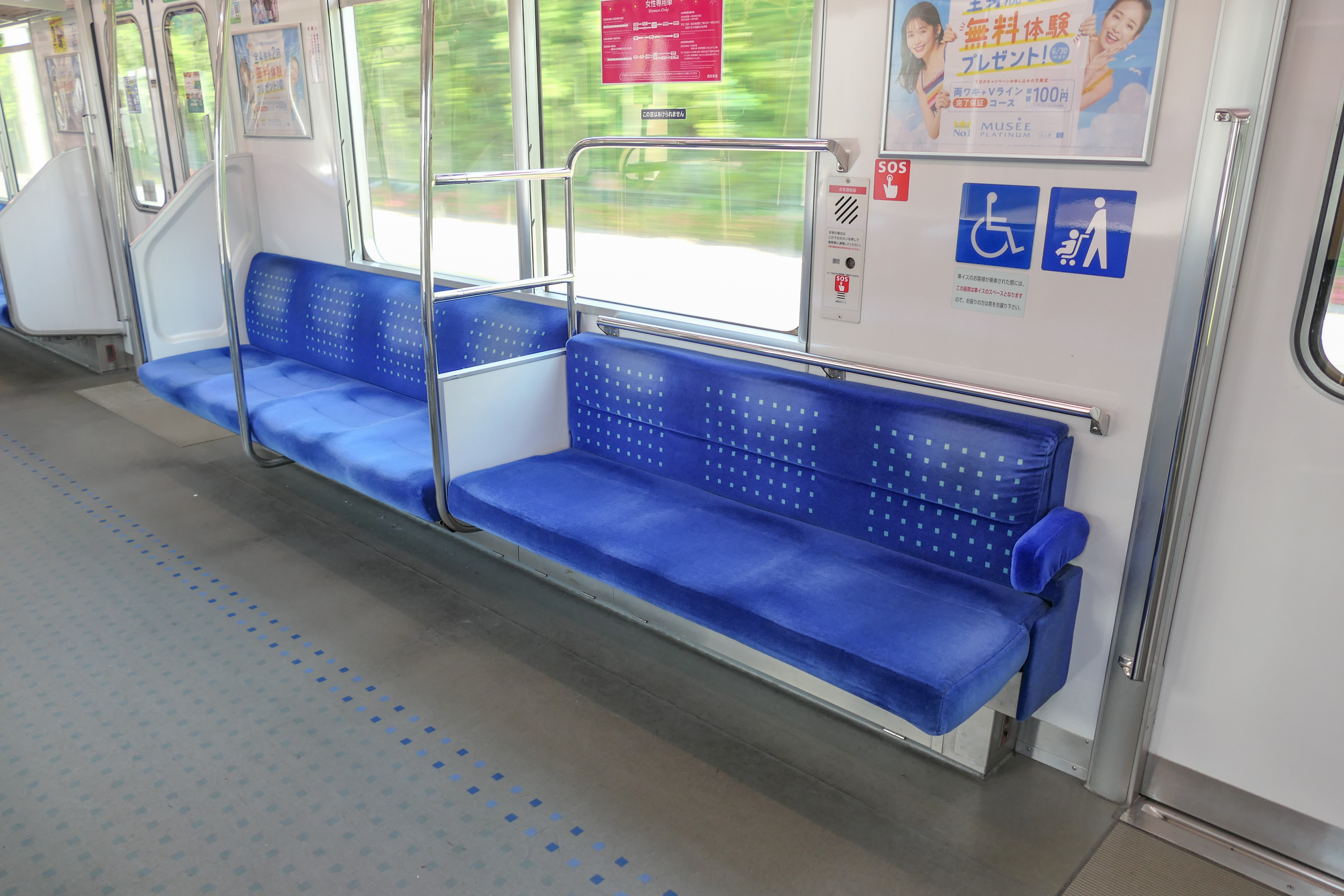
Wheelchair space (Set 20108)

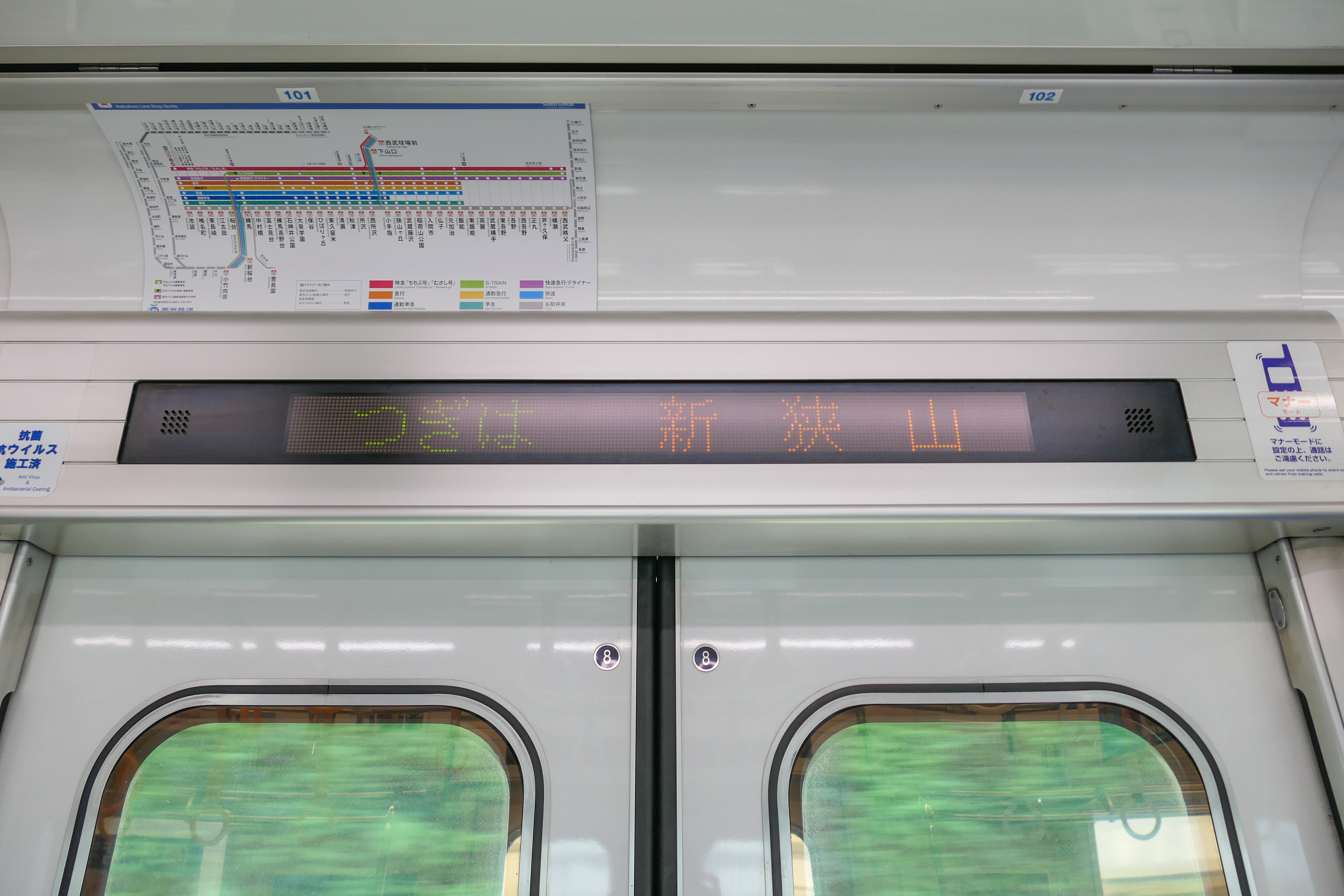
LED passenger information display

== History ==
The first train was built in 1999, undergoing test running before entering revenue service in 2000.

In August 2015, set 20101 was modified with full-colour LED destination indicators replacing the original three-colour LED type.

== Livery variations ==
=== Galaxy Express 999 ===
From 8 October 2016, eight-car set 20158 operated in a special Galaxy Express 999 vinyl wrapping livery. It is scheduled to operate in this livery until March 2019.

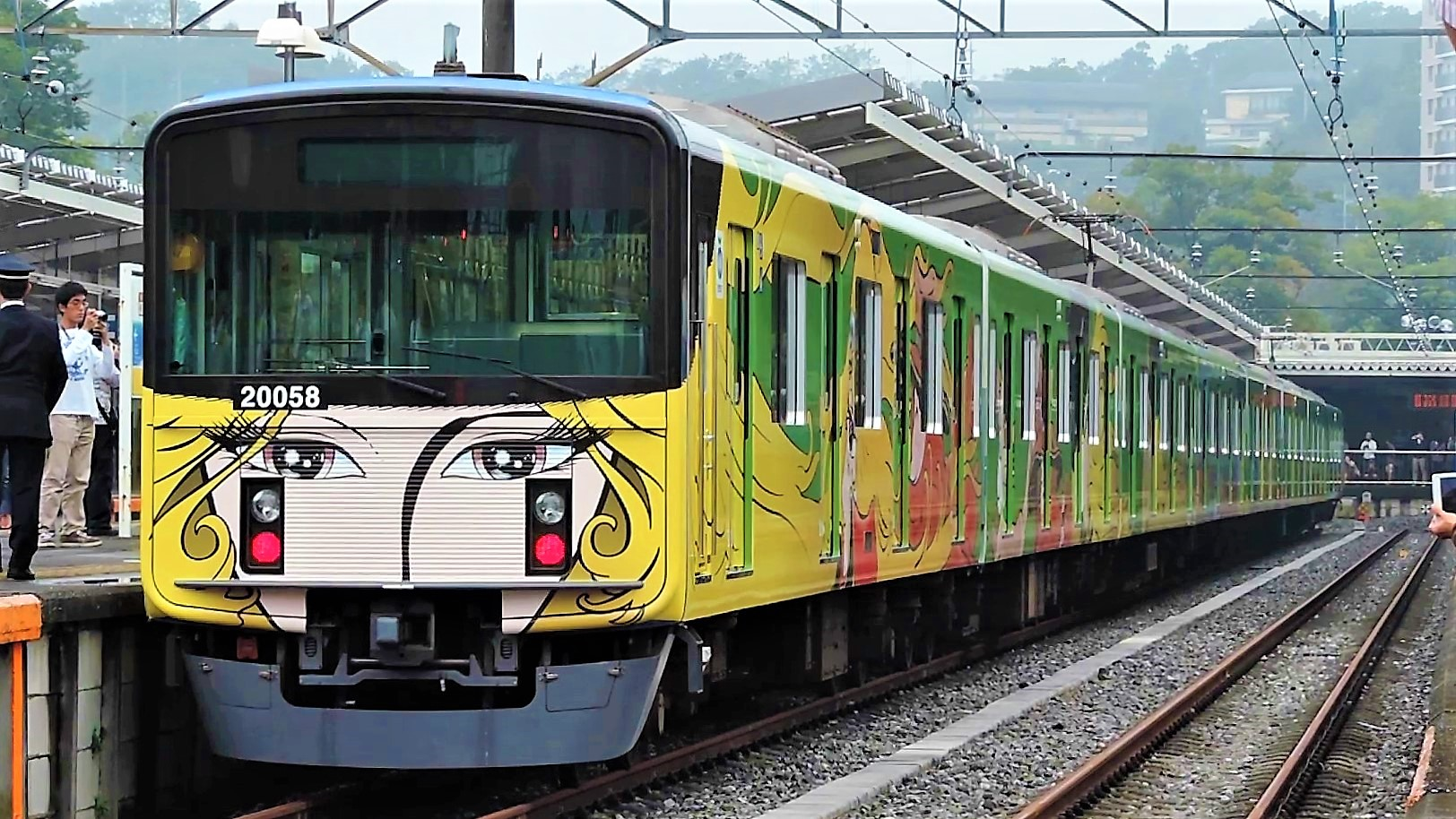
Set 20158 in Galaxy Express 999 livery (20058 end) in October 2016

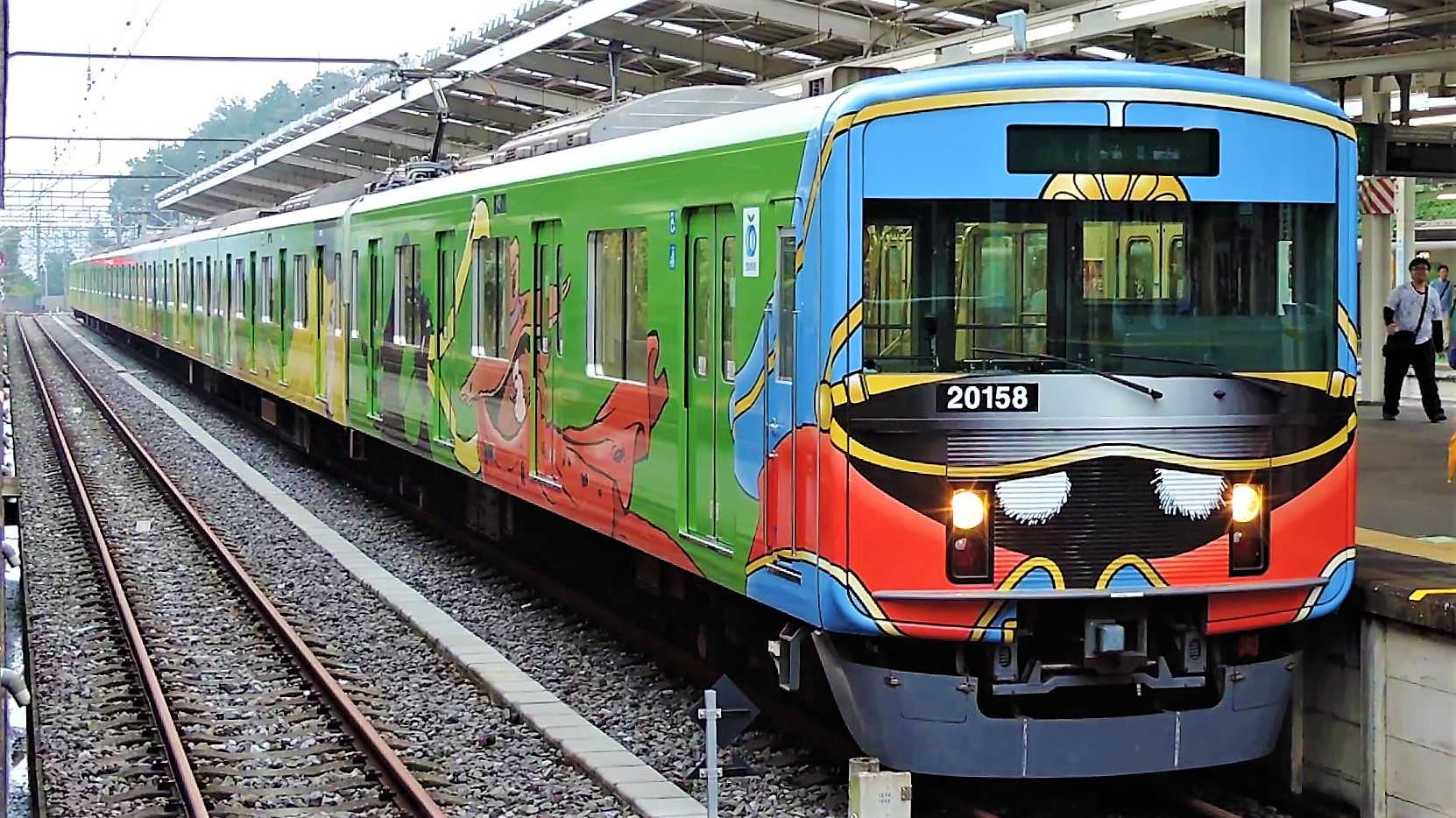
Set 20158 in Galaxy Express 999 livery (20158 end) in October 2016

=== L-train ===
From 15 January 2018, two ten-car sets, 20104 and 20105, are scheduled to operate in a special "L-train" livery consisting of the Saitama Seibu Lions baseball team colour of dark blue with Seibu Lions logos. From January 2022, the two sets' liveries were updated to depict 20 active players instead of the previous combination of veteran and current players. The sets re-entered service on the Shinjuku, Haijima, Ikebukuro, and Sayama lines from then.

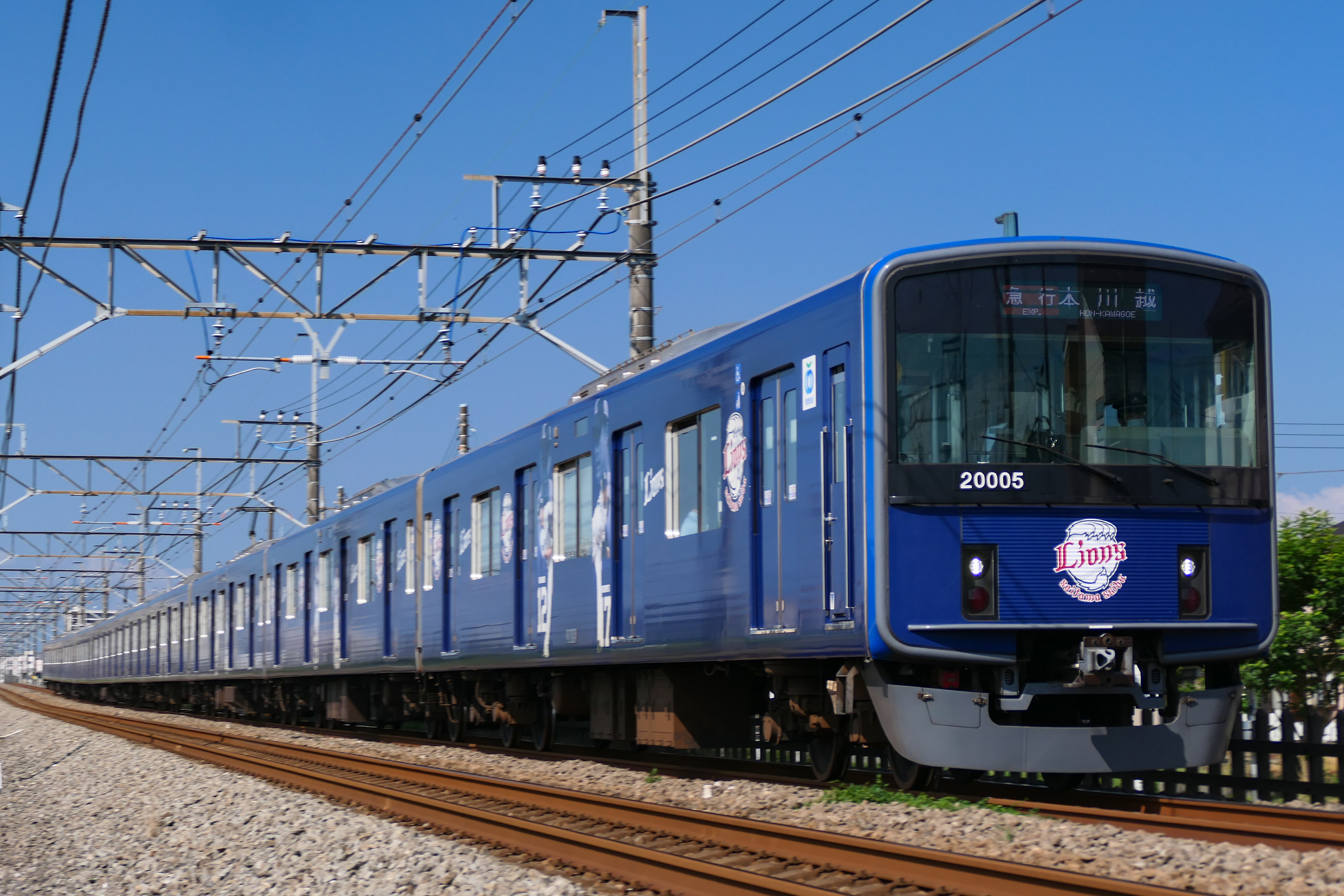
Set 20105 in L-train livery in July 2022
