= Haijima Station =

Railway station in Akishima, Tokyo, Japan

JC55 SS36 Haijima Station 拝島駅
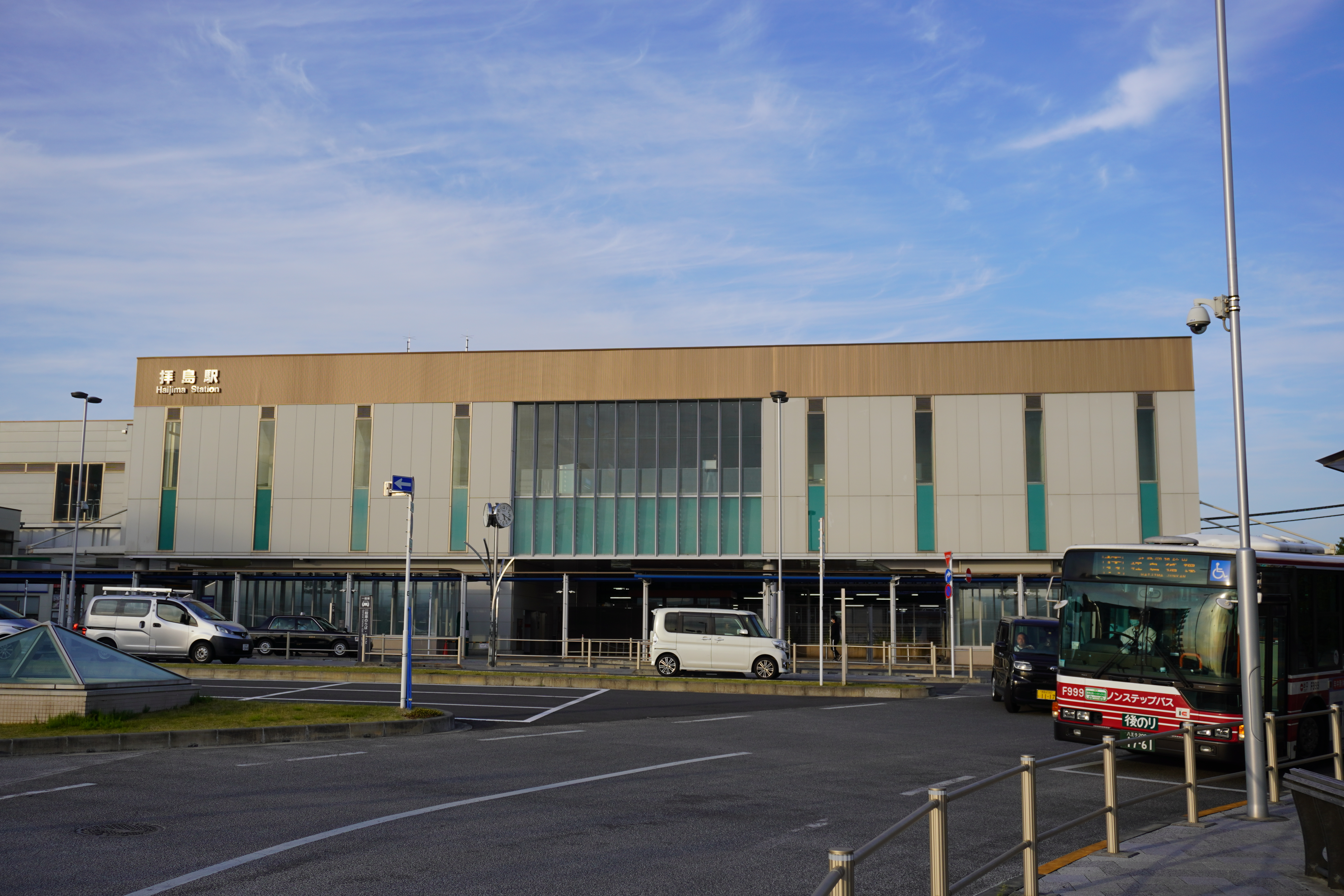
- South side of the station in April 2021

General information
- Location: 4 Matsubara-chō (JR East); 5-21-2 Mihori-chō (Seibu); Akishima, Tokyo （東京都昭島市松原町4丁目 (JR East) 東京都昭島市美堀町5-21-2 (Seibu)） Japan
- Coordinates: 35°43′16″N 139°20′37″E
- Operator: JR East; Seibu Railway; JR Freight
- Lines: Ōme Line; Itsukaichi Line; ■ Hachikō Line; Seibu Haijima Line
- Distance: 6.9 km from Tachikawa
- Platforms: 1 side platform + 3 island platforms

Other information
- Status: staffed ("Midori no Madoguchi")
- Station code: JC 55 (JR East); SS 36 (Seibu)

History
- Opened: 19 November 1894

Passengers
- FY2019: 29,946 (JR East); 36,317 (Seibu)

Services
Preceding station	JR East	Following station
Ushihama One-way operation	Ōme Line Commuter Special Rapid	Akishima JC54 towards Tachikawa
Ushihama JC56 towards Ōme	Ōme Line Ōme Special Rapid	Akishima JC54 towards Tachikawa
Ushihama JC56 towards Ōme	Ōme Line Commuter Rapid	Akishima One-way operation
Ushihama JC56 towards Oku-Tama	Ōme Line Rapid Local	Akishima JC54 towards Tachikawa
Kumagawa JC81 towards Musashi-Itsukaichi	Itsukaichi Line Ōme Special Rapid Rapid Local	through to Ōme Line
Higashi-Fussa towards Komagawa	Hachikō Line	Komiya towards Hachiōji
Preceding station	Seibu Railway	Following station
Terminus	Haijima Liner	Seibu-Tachikawa SS35 towards Seibu-Shinjuku
Terminus	Haijima Line Express Semi Express Local	Seibu-Tachikawa SS35 towards Kodaira
Location
- Location within Tokyo Location within Japan

Haijima Station (拝島駅, Haijima-eki) is an interchange passenger railway station located in the city of Akishima, Tokyo, Japan, jointly operated by East Japan Railway Company (JR East) and the private railway operator Seibu Railway. The station is also a freight depot for the Japan Freight Railway Company (JR Freight).

== Lines ==
Haijima is a major stop on the Ōme Line between Ōme and Tachikawa, with through services operating to and from Tokyo via the Chūō Line (Rapid). Haijima is a station stop for the Ōme limited express service. It is 6.9 kilometers from the start of the Ōme Line at Tachikawa.

Nominally a terminus of the Itsukaichi Line, Haijima has many through trains going from Tachikawa to Musashi-Itsukaichi.

Trains on the Hachikō Line connect Haijima to Hachiōji and Komagawa, with through services to and from Kawagoe on the Kawagoe Line. It is 9.9 kilometers from Hachiōji Station.

Haijima is a terminus of the Seibu Haijima Line, with services running from Seibu Shinjuku via the Seibu Shinjuku Line. It is 14.3 kilometers from the opposing terminus of the line at Kodaira and 36.9 kilometers from Seibu Shinjuku Station.

The station also has an industrial line to Yokota Air Base for supplying fuels to the base.

== Station layout ==
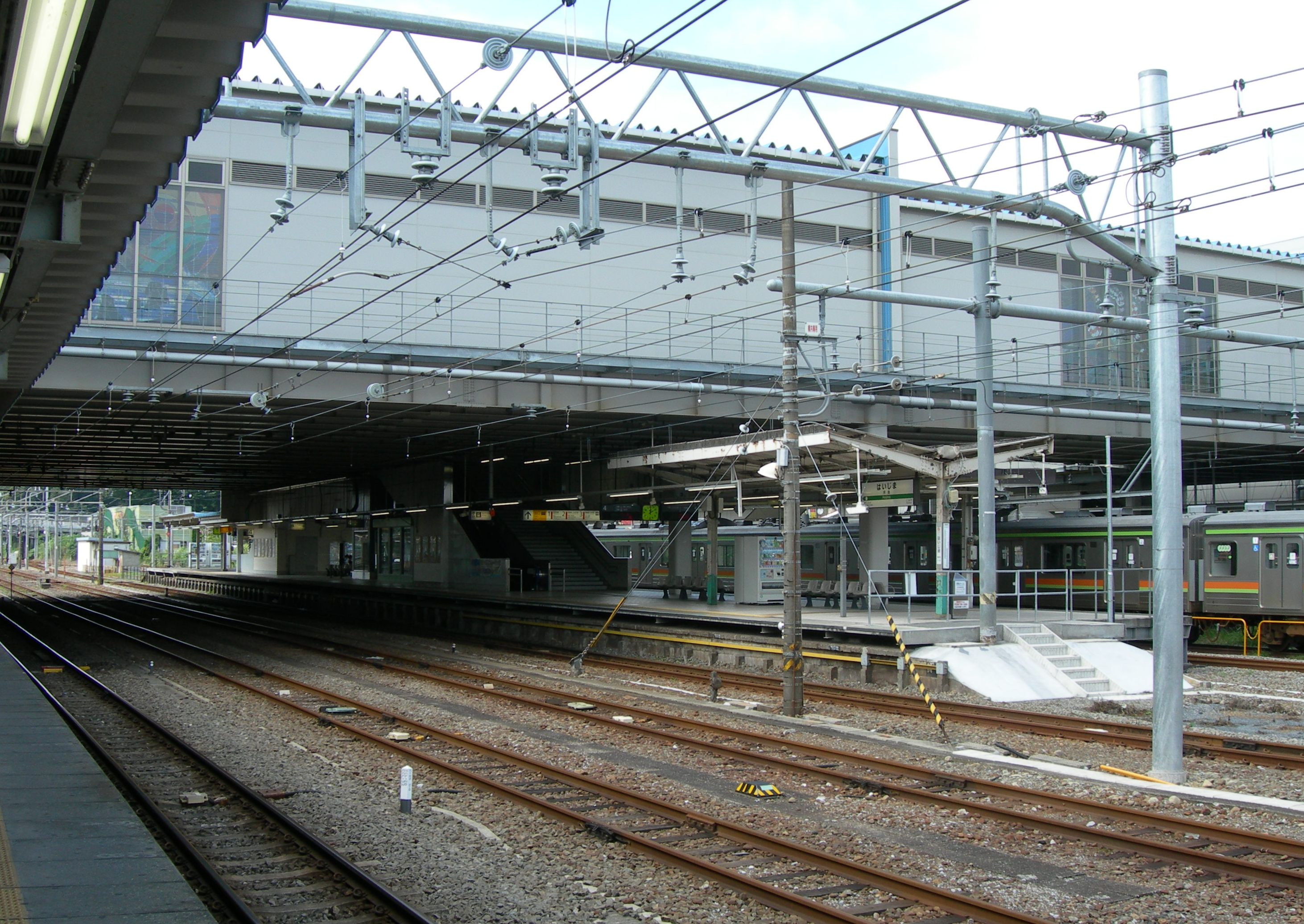
View of Hachikō Line platforms 4 and 5 from platform 3, August 2009

The JR East side of the station consists of one side platform and two island platforms serving a total of five tracks. The station building is elevated and is above the tracks and platforms. the station has a "Midori no Madoguchi" staffed ticket office.

The Seibu side of the station consists of one island platform serving two tracks.

=== Platforms ===
1	Itsukaichi Line	for Musashi-Itsukaichi
2	Ōme Line	for Ōme and Okutama
3	Ōme Line	for Tachikawa, Shinjuku, and Tokyo
4	■ Hachikō Line	for Komagawa and Kawagoe
5	■ Hachikō Line	for Hachiōji
6/7	Seibu Haijima Line	for Kodaira and Seibu-Shinjuku

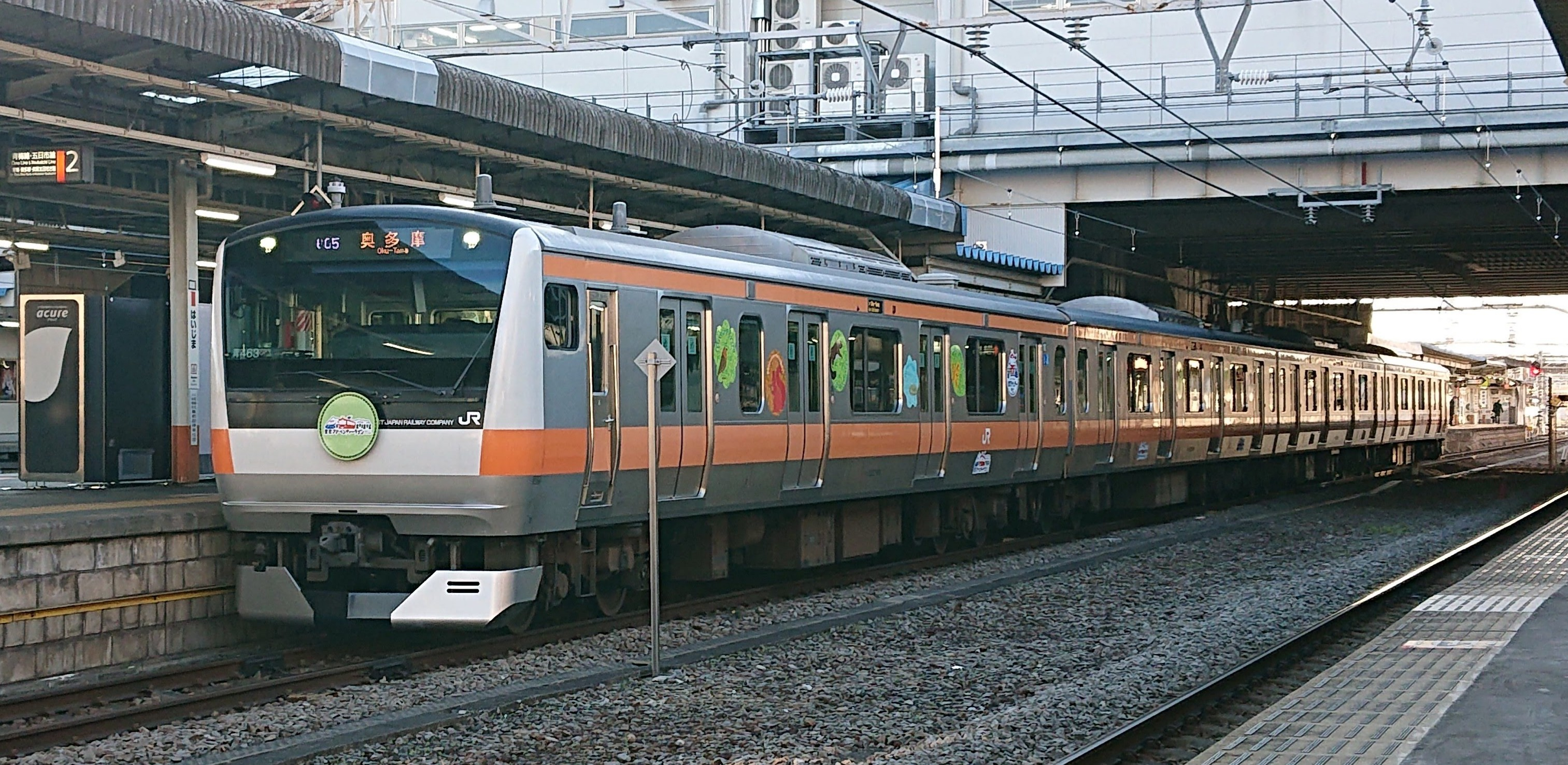
An E233 series train on the Ōme Line in Tokyo Adventure Line wrapping.

Low-cost platform edge doors consisting of three bars that are raised and lowered were installed along part of platform 5 on an experimental basis in March 2015.

== History ==
The station opened on 19 November 1894. The Seibu station opened on 15 May 1968.

The southern section of the Hachikō Line between Hachiōji and Komagawa was electrified on 16 March 1996, with through services commencing between Hachiōji and Kawagoe.

Station numbering was introduced on all Seibu Railway lines during fiscal 2012, with Haijima Station becoming "SS36".

== Passenger statistics ==
In fiscal 2019, the JR portion the station was used by an average of 29,946 passengers daily (boarding passengers only). In the same fiscal year, the station was the 26th busiest on the Seibu network with an average of 36,317 passengers daily.

The passenger figures in previous years are as shown below. Note that the JR East figures only consider boarding passengers whereas the Seibu figures consider both entering and exiting passengers.

Fiscal year	Daily average (JR)	Daily average (Seibu)
2005	26,225	14,118
2010	28,350	16,556
2015	29,880	17,668

== Surrounding area ==
- Haijima Daishi Temple
