= Kodaira Station =

Railway station in Kodaira, Tokyo, Japan

SS19 Kodaira Station 小平駅
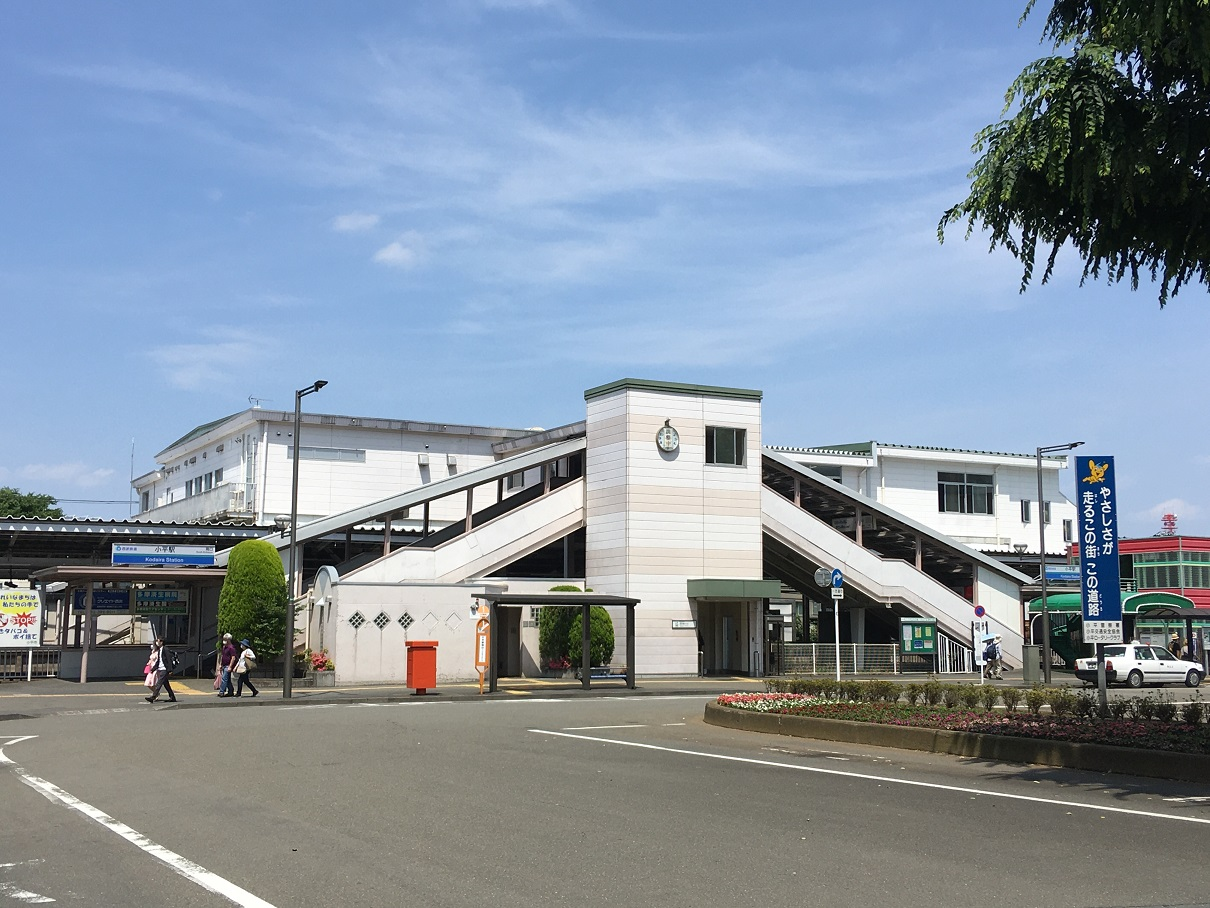
- Kodaira Station, June 2020

General information
- Location: 1-34-1 Mizono-cho, Kodaira-shi, Tokyo 187-0041; Japan
- Coordinates: 35°44′13″N 139°29′18″E
- Operator: Seibu Railway
- Lines: Seibu Shinjuku Line; Seibu Haijima Line
- Distance: 22.6 km from Seibu-Shinjuku
- Platforms: 2 island platforms
- Connections: Bus stop

Other information
- Station code: SS19
- Website: Official website

History
- Opened: April 16, 1927

Passengers
- FY 2019: 38,780 daily

Services
Preceding station	Seibu Railway	Following station
Hagiyama SS30 towards Haijima	Haijima Liner	Takadanobaba SS02 towards Seibu-Shinjuku
Kumegawa SS20 towards Hon-Kawagoe	Shinjuku Line Express Semi Express Local	Hana-Koganei SS18 towards Seibu-Shinjuku
Hagiyama SS30 towards Haijima	Haijima Line Express Semi Express Local	through to Shinjuku Line
Location
- Location within Tokyo Location within Japan

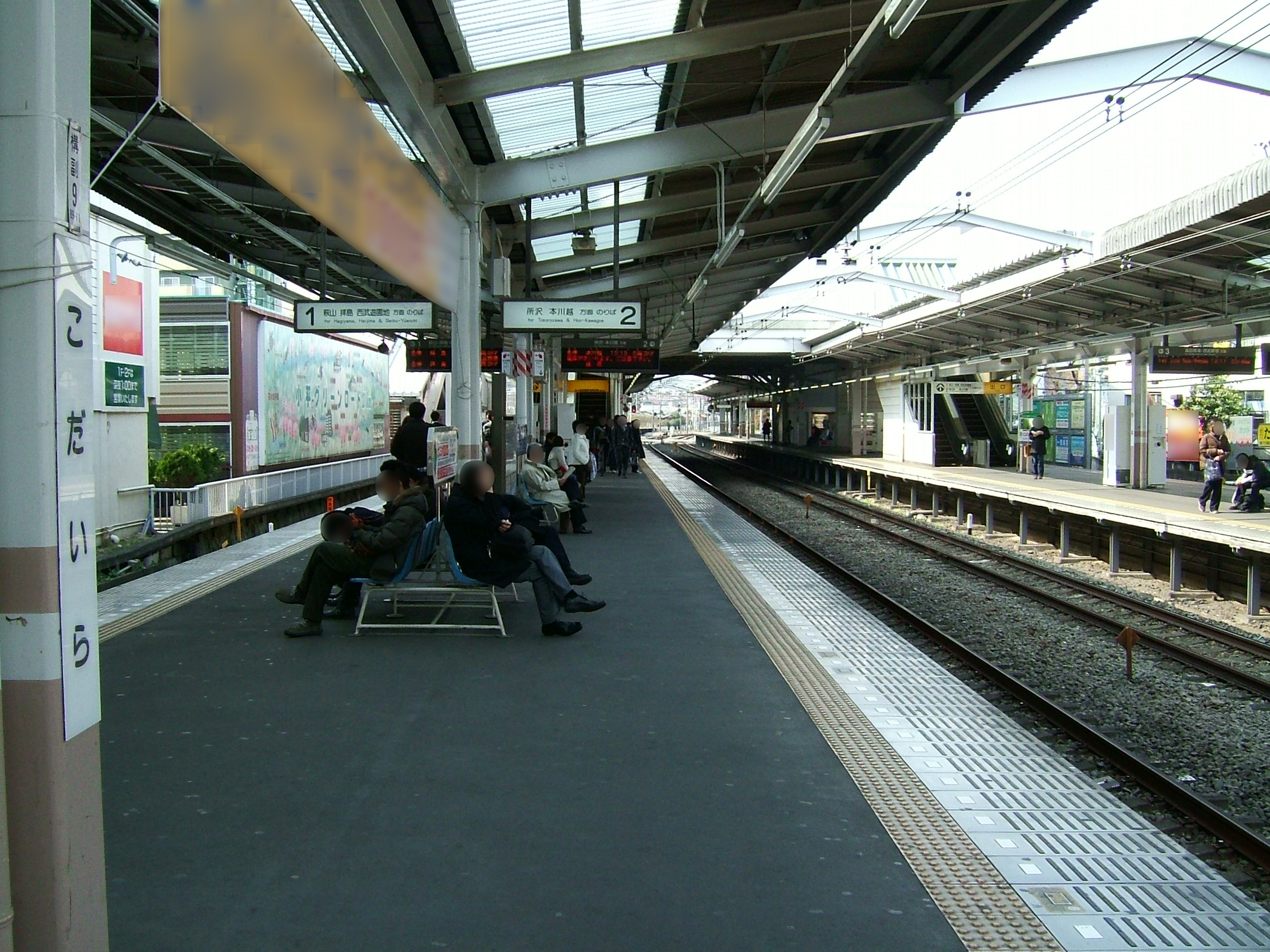
Platform 1/2 at Kodaira station, facing north

Kodaira Station (小平駅, Kodaira-eki) is a junction passenger railway station located in the city of Kodaira, Tokyo, Japan, operated by the private railway operator Seibu Railway.

== Lines ==
Kodaira Station is served by the 47.5 km Seibu Shinjuku Line from Seibu-Shinjuku in Tokyo to Hon-Kawagoe in Saitama Prefecture. It is located 22.6 kilometers from the terminus of the line at Seibu-Shinjuku. It is also the terminus for the 14.3 kilometer Seibu Haijima Line to Haijima.

== Station layout ==
The station has two island platforms serving four tracks, with an elevated station building located above the platforms and tracks.

=== Platforms ===
1	Seibu Haijima Line	for Tamagawa-Jōsui
2	Seibu Shinjuku Line	for Tokorozawa and Hon-Kawagoe
3	Seibu Shinjuku Line	for Tanashi, Takadanobaba, and Seibu-Shinjuku
4	Seibu Shinjuku Line	for Tanashi, Takadanobaba, and Seibu-Shinjuku (through from the Seibu Haijima Line)

== History ==
The station opened on April 16, 1927.

Station numbering was introduced on all Seibu Railway lines during fiscal 2012, with Kodaira Station becoming "SS19".

== Passenger statistics ==
In fiscal 2019, the station was the 25th busiest on the Seibu network with an average of 38,780 passengers daily.

The passenger figures for previous years are as shown below.

Fiscal year	Daily average
2005	36,032
2010	37,344
2015	38,405

== Surrounding area ==
Kodaira Station has South and North exits. Near the South Exit are the Kodaira Seiyu department store, a public building named Rune, a high school run by the government of Tokyo, and, about 1.75 km away, Shin-Kodaira Station on the JR Musashino Line. The North Exit is convenient for the Kodaira Metropolitan Cemetery.

== See also ==
- List of railway stations in Japan
