= Tokyo Fire Department =

Fire department of Tokyo Metropolis, Japan

- 東京消防庁
- The Tokyo Fire Mark, a unique mark used instead of the Firefighter's Emblem of Japan used in most municipal departments, and as the department's logo.

- The flag of the TFD, consisting of the Tokyo Fire Mark defaced onto an Edo Purple base.

Operational area
- Country: Japan
- Prefecture: Tokyo Metropolis
- Municipalities: All except Inagi City and the Tokyo Islands.
- Address: 1-3-5, Ōtemachi, Chiyoda-ku
- Coordinates: 35°41′19.8″N 139°45′41.6″E

Agency overview
- Established: March 7, 1948; 78 years ago
- Annual calls: 1,095,531 (2024)
- Employees: 18,839 (2025)
- Annual budget: ¥266,217,155,000 (2023)
- Staffing: Career
- Fire chief: Hirozō Ichikawa (2025)

Facilities and equipmentㅤ(2024)
- Districts: 10
- Stations: 81 (+3 sub-stations)
- Branch Stations: 208
- Fire Engines: 673
- Ladder Vehicles: 91
- Chemical Fire Engines: 48
- Ambulances: 393
- Rescue Vehicles: 50
- Command Vehicles: 115
- Watercraft: 9
- Aircraft: 7

Website
- https://www.tfd.metro.tokyo.lg.jp

The Tokyo Fire Department (Japanese: 東京消防庁, Hepburn: Tōkyō Shōbōchō) is the fire department of Tokyo Metropolis, Japan. Formed in 1948 during the post-war reorganisation of Japan's government, the TFD is today the largest fire department in Japan by number of firefighters, operating out of their headquarters in the Ōtemachi District of Chiyoda Ward and their 292 fire stations, sub-stations, and branch stations spread across the prefecture. The TFD is often cited as the largest fire department in the world by number of staff, outnumbering comparable departments such as the New York City Fire Department or the Paris Fire Brigade.

In the 2024 financial year, the TFD received 1,095,531 emergency 119 calls, and responded to 4,330 fires (a 9.5% increase on the previous year; 70% of these were building fires), 918,311 calls for emergency medical services, 28,155 technical rescue operations, and 6,418 other calls for assistance, including 2,162 hazardous materials incidents, 1,163 calls to assist police, and 584 animal rescue callouts. The year also saw the TFD process 43,033 building fire safety plan applications and 3,842 submissions related to hazardous materials licensing, as well as delivering 36,360 fire safety inspections and hosting 10,397 fire safety events with over 1 million participants.

Firefighting in Tokyo presents several unique challenges; demand for emergency medical services has been rising rapidly across the metropolis as a result of Japan's aging population, necessitating an increased focus on ambulance provision and the introduction of diversion services, such as consultation hotlines, to ease pressures on emergency medical systems. Climate change has also increased the work of the TFD, as hotter summers have led to an increase in medical emergencies, and more frequent severe weather events increase the demand for rescue work, both within Tokyo and across Japan (where the TFD is often dispatched to support smaller municipal fire departments due to its increased size and capabilities). Finally, the expected threat of a Nankai megathrust earthquake in the near-future necessitates intensive disaster preparedness work and the maintenance of surplus resources and staff to meet the anticipated damage of such an event.

== History ==
The first fire brigades in Edo (the previous name for Tokyo) were known as hikeshi (火消); initially, the first hikeshi were made up of samurai loyal to feudal lords or daimyō, who were required to keep a residence in Edo, but in 1657, the Great Fire of Meireki ripped through Edo destroying 60-70% of the city and killing over 100,000 people, with the local daimyō bikeshi brigades too undermanned, underequipped, and inexperienced to deal with such a large fire. This failure of fire control represented a severe threat to the authority of the ruling military shogunate, and so one year later the jō bikeshi (定火消) was established as a full-time brigade made up of hatamoto samurai directly under the command of the shogun. This brigade was mainly concerned with the protection of the shogun's properties, such as Edo Castle, however did cooperate with the daimyō bikeshi to deal with fires in common areas, so as to not let them spread.

By the time the Meiji era emerged, most firefighting across Tokyo was undertaken by local volunteers in brigades called machi bikeshi, and the number of samurai firefighters had dropped significantly. As a result of reforms in the 1880s following the Meiji restoration, the career fire brigades were absorbed into the Tokyo Metropolitan Police Department, whereas the volunteer firefighters were reorganised into groups known as shōbō gumi (消防組) under the control of the governor of the new Tokyo Prefecture.

In 1945, towards the end of the Pacific War, Tokyo was firebombed heavily due to its role as the capital of Japan; the number of casualties from the series of napalm bombing raids is disputed, but most estimates place it around 100,000 deaths.

Following the end of the war, firefighting in Japan was reorganised, creating the modern municipal fire department system; as a result, the Tokyo Fire Department was created in 1948.

In 2019, during the response to Typhoon Hagibis, an elderly woman being rescued died when she fell from a rescue hoist of a TFD helicopter because the rescuers had failed to properly secure her. The two air rescue personnel involved in the incident were officially reprimanded, but were not fired and did not face criminal or civil penalties.

== Organisation ==
=== Fire Headquarters ===
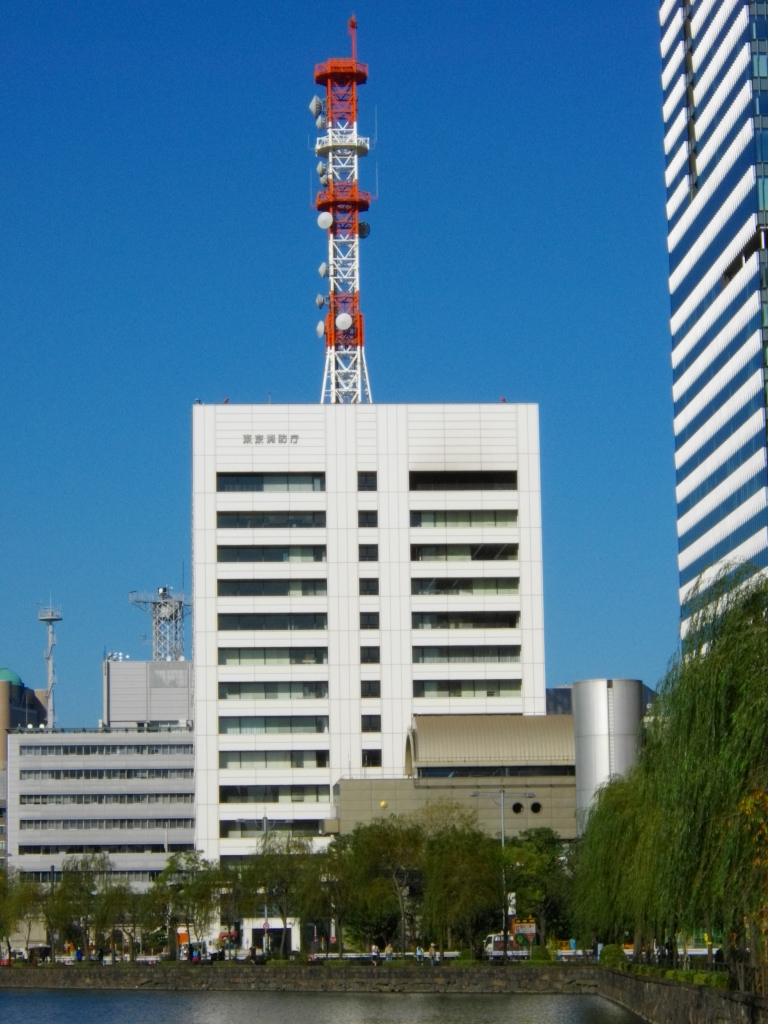
The TFD headquarters is co-located with Marunouchi Fire Station in Shibuya

The TFD's stations are assisted in providing frontline and public-facing services by the fire department headquarters which is responsible for the development of policy and procedure via its departments and divisions:

- Planning and Coordination Department (企画調整部)
  - Planning Division (企画課)
  - Finance Division (財務課)
  - Public Relations Division (広報課)
- Safety Promotion Department (安全推進部)
  - Safety Promotion Division (安全推進課)
  - Safety Technology Division (安全技術課)
- General Affairs Department (総務部)
  - General Affairs Division (総務課)
  - Accounting and Contracts Division (経理契約課)
  - Facilities Division (施設課)
  - Information and Communication Division (情報通信課)
- Personnel Department (人事部)
  - Personnel Division (人事課)
  - Service Inspection Division (服務監察課)
  - Staff Division (職員課)
  - Welfare Division (厚生課)
- Fire Defence Department (防警部)
  - Fire Defence Division (防警課)
  - Rescue Division (逮捕課)
  - Special Disaster Division (特殊災害課)
  - General Command Centre (総合指令室)
  - Tama Command Centre (多摩指令室)
- Disaster Preparedness Department (防災部)
  - Disaster Preparedness and Safety Division (防災安全課 )
  - Earthquake Disaster Countermeasures Division (震災対策課)
  - Water Resources Division (水利課)
  - Volunteer Fire Corps Division (消防団課)
- Ambulance Department (救急部)
  - Ambulance Management Division (救急管理課)
  - Ambulance Medical Division (救急医務課)
  - Ambulance Training Division (救急指導課)
- Prevention Department (予防部)
  - Prevention Division (予防課)
  - Hazardous Materials Division (危険物課)
  - Inspection Division (査察課)
  - Investigation Division (調査課)
  - Fire Prevention Management Division (防火管理課)
- Equipment Department (装備部)
  - Equipment Division (装備課)
  - Equipment Factory (装備工場)
  - Air Corps (航空隊)
- Fire Academy (消防学校)
  - School Administration Division (校務課)
  - Training Division (教養課)

The TFD is one of the few departments in Japan which directly maintains an aviation unit, as opposed to one being provided by the prefecture. The unit, operating out of two bases in Central and Western Tokyo respectively, commenced operations in 1967 and has primary used French-manufactured firefighting helicopters from Eurocopter and Aérospatiale. The unit delivers multiple competencies, including aerial firefighting against both wildfires and, uniquely, against high-rise building fires, air ambulance services (including a capability to provide a doctor-led Helicopter Emergency Medical Service or HEMS) especially aeromedical evacuation of patients from the Tokyo Islands to the mainland, search and rescue, heavy lifting of rescue equipment to remote areas, and aerial intelligence gathering.

For major disasters, the TFD maintains a Quick Reaction Force (Japanese: 即応対処部隊, Hepburn: Sokuō taisho butai) under its headquarters; the force is designed to provide a rapid response and assessment capability for major disasters such as earthquakes and tsunami, specialising in gaining access to areas made inaccessible by debris, mudslides, or liquefaction. Consisting of an Intelligence Unit to assess the incident ground and a Rescue Unit to perform snatch rescues, the force makes particular use of specialised all-terrain fire appliances, video drones, and watercraft.

Uniquely, the TFD maintains a specialist ambulance group directly under its headquarters, the Mobility Ambulance Task Force (Japanese: 救急機動部隊, Hepburn: Kyūkyū kidō butai) which specialises in the response to mass casualty incidents, patients with highly infectious diseases, bariatric transport, and response to patients who do not speak Japanese. The unit consists of 3 normal high-standard ambulances and 1 negative-pressure ambulance for transporting infectious patients, as well as carrying bariatric stretchers and lifting equipment. The teams are based out of stand-by locations in the community for rapid response; during the day, they are split between Tokyo Station and the residential Setagaya district, whereas at night they are split between the nightlife districts of Roppongi and Shinjuku.

=== Fire District Headquarters ===
As is typical for Japanese fire departments, the TFD is divided up into several stations, which provide services to a wide area, with subordinate branch stations which are simple emergency response posts in the Western sense; however, the TFD is also the only municipal fire department in Japan to group their stations into formal districts with district headquarters due to the size and heterogeneity of the area covered by the department, which is not found in any other jurisdiction in the country. As is typical, each station is its own self-defined command structure with multiple divisions and sections, including both operational crews and office-based units such as fire prevention, community liaison, and general affairs. Each district headquarters also has Guidance Sections (指導係), Firefighting Equipment Sections (警防装備係), Training Sections (訓練係), and Disaster Prevention Sections (防災係).

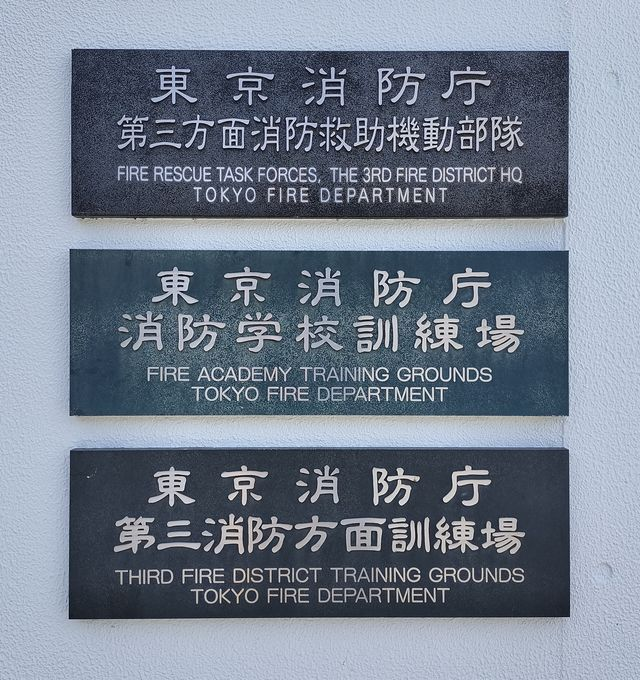
One of the TFD's complexes in Hatagaya, home to the 3rd Fire District Headquarters and its Fire Rescue Task Force.

The TFD also maintains several Fire Rescue Task Forces (Japanese: 消防救助機動部隊, Hepburn: Shōbō kyūjo kidō butai) nicknamed "Hyper Rescue" directly subordinate to the 2nd, 3rd, 6th, 8th, and 9th district headquarters; formed in 1996 in response to the Great Hanshin-Awaji Earthquake, these task forces are trained and equipped to provide fire and technical rescue at a higher level than the special rescue teams deployed at stations across Tokyo, and as a result are often called to provide support across district lines or outside of the metropolis. Each of the teams, as well as providing general advanced technical rescue, has its own specialty:

- 2nd Fire Rescue Task Force: This task force, the first to be set up in 1996, is specialised in dealing with post-earthquake conflagrations and heavy urban search and rescue, due to the proportion of pre-war wooden housing stock and heavy industry in its area. It consists of a Mobile Rescue Team, a Mobile Heavy Machinery Team, and a Mobile Ambulance Rescue Team.
- 3rd Fire Rescue Task Force: This task force, established in 2002 as a result of the Tokyo subway sarin attack and the September 11th attacks, is specialised in responding to CBRN disasters. It consists of a Mobile Science Team for dealing with the agent, a Mobile Rescue Team to recover casualties, and a Mobile Ambulance Rescue Team to decontaminate and treat those affected.
- 6th Fire Rescue Task Force: This task force is specialised in post-earthquake fire control, heavy rescue and water rescue, due to the wooden housing stock and low-lying geography of its area. Similarly to the 2nd task force, it consists of a Mobile Rescue Team, a Mobile Heavy Machinery Team, and a Mobile Ambulance Rescue Team.
- 8th Fire Rescue Task Force: This task force, the first to be established in the Tama region, is specialised in both heavy rescue and CBRN response in order to provide both capabilities in the outlying region capable of managing an incident before out-of-area help arrives. It includes a Mobile Rescue Team, a Mobile Heavy Machinery Team, a Mobile Science Team, and a Mobile Ambulance Rescue Team, and is based out out of the Tachikawa Wide-Area Disaster Prevention Base.
- 9th Fire Rescue Task Force: This task force, the newest of them all having been established in 2016, is specialised in landslide rescue and wildfire suppression, to tackle the unique risk that these disaster pose to the rural Tama region. It includes a Mobile Rescue Team, a Mobile Heavy Machinery Team, and a Mobile Ambulance Rescue Team.

=== Fire Districts, Stations, and Branches ===
The 1st Fire District Headquarters (Japanese: 第一消防方面本部, Hepburn: Dai-ichi shōbō hōmen honbu), headquartered at Kōjimachi Fire Station, covers the special wards of Chiyoda, Chūō, and Minato in the central Tokyo wards region. The stations in this district cover many of traditional eastern Tokyo's most populous areas, such as the shopping and entertainment districts of Akihabara, Ginza, and Yūrakuchō, as well as several of the capital's most important buildings, such as the National Diet, the Imperial Palace, and Tokyo Station.

Fire Station	Image	Address	Sub-Stations	Branch Stations
Marunouchi Fire Station Japanese: 丸の内消防署 Hepburn: Marunouchi shōbōsho		1-3-5, Ōtemachi, Chiyoda-ku	None	Yurakucho Branch Station (有楽町出張所)
Kōjimachi Fire Station Japanese: 麹町消防署 Hepburn: Kōjimachi shōbōsho		1-1-12, Kōjimachi, Chiyoda-ku	None	Nagatachō Branch Station (永田町出張所)
Kanda Fire Station Japanese: 神田消防署 Hepburn: Kanda shōbōsho		4-14-3, Sotokanda, Chiyoda-ku (Sotokanda district forms the majority of Akihabara)	None	Kajichō Branch Station (鍛冶町出張所)
Kyōbashi Fire Station Japanese: 京橋消防署 Hepburn: Kyōbashi shōbōsho		3-14-1, Kyōbashi, Chūō-ku	None	Tsukiji Branch Station (築地出張所) Ginza Branch Station (銀座出張所)
Nihonbashi Fire Station Japanese: 日本橋消防署 Hepburn: Nihonbashi shōbōsho		14-12, Nihonbashi Kabutochō, Chūō-ku	None	Horidome Branch Station (堀留出張所) Ningyōchō Branch Station (人形町出張所) Hamachō Branch Station (浜町出張所)
Rinkō Fire Station Japanese: 臨港消防署 Hepburn: Rinkō shōbōsho		5-8-20, Harumi, Chūō-ku	None	Tsukishima Branch Station (月島出張所)
Shiba Fire Station Japanese: 芝消防署 Hepburn: Shiba shōbōsho		2-13-7, Higashi-Shinbashi, Minato-ku	None	Shibaura Branch Station (芝浦出張所)
Azabu Fire Station Japanese: 麻布消防署 Hepburn: Azabu shōbōsho		3-4-42, Moto-Azabu, Minato-ku	None	Īkura Branch Station (飯倉出張所)
Akasaka Fire Station Japanese: 赤坂消防署 Hepburn: Akasaka shōbōsho		2-16-9, Minami-Aoyama, Minato-ku	None	Shinmachi Branch Station (新町出張所)
Takanawa Fire Station Japanese: 高輪消防署 Hepburn: Takanawa shōbōsho		4-12-2, Shirokane, Mintao-ku	None	Sankō Branch Station (三光出張所) Kōnan Branch Station (港南出張所) Nihonenoki Branch Station (二本榎出張所)

The 2nd Fire District Headquarters (Japanese: 第二消防方面本部, Hepburn: Dai-ni shōbō hōmen honbu), headquartered at Ōmori Fire Station, covers the special wards of Ōta and Shinagawa in the southern Tokyo wards region. In addition to providing general firefighting, Kamata Fire Station is responsible for providing aircraft rescue and firefighting services to Haneda Airport via its Airport Sub-Station, alongside the airfield fire unit operated by the Japan Civil Aviation Bureau.

Fire Station	Image	Address	Sub-Stations	Branch Stations
Shinagawa Fire Station Japanese: 品川消防署 Hepburn: Shinagawa shōbōsho		3-7-31, Kita-Shinagawa, Shinagawa-ku	None	Higashi-Shinagawa Branch Station (東品川出張所) Ōsaki Branch Station (大崎出張所) Gotanda Branch Station (五反田出張所)
Ōi Fire Station Japanese: 大井消防署 Hepburn: Ōi shōbōsho		3-6-12, Higashi-Ōi, Shinagawa-ku	None	Takiōji Branch Station (滝王子出張所) Yashio Branch Station (八潮出張所)
Ebara Fire Station Japanese: 荏原消防署 Hepburn: Ebara shōbōsho		3-16-20, Hiratsuka, Shinagawa-ku	None	Togoshi Branch Station (戸越出張所) Kōyama Branch Station (小山出張所) Hatanodai Branch Station (旗の台出張所)
Ōmori Fire Station Japanese: 大森消防署 Hepburn: Ōmori shōbōsho		1-32-8, Ōmori-Higashi, Ōta-ku	None	Magome Branch Station (馬込出張所) Ichinokura Branch Station (市野倉出張所) Sanya Branch Station (山谷出張所) Morigasaki Branch Station (森ケ崎出張所)
Den-en-chōfu Fire Station Japanese: 田園調布消防署 Hepburn: Den-en-chōfu shōbōsho		13-22, Yukigaya-Ōtsuka, Ōta-ku	None	Yukigaya Branch Station (雪谷出張所) Kugahara Branch Station (久が原出張所)
Kamata Fire Station Japanese: 蒲田消防署 Hepburn: Kamata shōbōsho		2-28-1, Kamata-Honcho, Ōta-ku	Airport Sub-Station (羽田出張所)	Haneda Branch Station (羽田出張所) Rokugō Branch Station (六郷出張所) Terminal Sub-Station Branch (ターミナル分駐所)
Yaguchi Fire Station Japanese: 矢口消防署 Hepburn: Yaguchi shōbōsho		2-5-20, Tamagawa, Ōta-ku	None	Shimomaruko Branch Station (下丸子出張所) Nishi-Kamata Branch Station (西蒲田出張所) Nishi-Rokugō Branch Station (西六郷出張所)

The 3rd Fire District Headquarters (Japanese: 第三消防方面本部, Hepburn: Dai-san shōbō hōmen honbu), headquartered at Setagaya Fire Station, covers the special wards of Shibuya, Setagaya, and Meguro in the south-western Tokyo wards region. As well as covering the lively western centre of Shibuya, the stations here cover the sprawling residential areas in Meguro and Setagaya that are home to large portions of the city's aging population, increasing demand for emergency medical services.

Fire Station	Image	Address	Sub-Stations	Branch Stations
Meguro Fire Station Japanese: 目黒消防署 Hepburn: Meguro shōbōsho		6-1-22, Shimomeguro, Meguro-ku	None	Nakameguro Branch Station (中目黒出張所) Himonya Branch Station (碑文谷出張所) Yakumo Branch Station (八雲出張所) Ōokayama Branch Station (大岡山出張所)
Setagaya Fire Station Japanese: 世田谷消防署本署 Hepburn: Setagaya shōbōsho		2-33-21, Sangenjaya, Setagaya-ku	None	Kitazawa Branch Station (北沢出張所) Miyanosaka Branch Station (宮の坂出張所) Matsubara Branch Station (松原出張所) Mishuku Branch Station (三宿出張所) Kamikitazawa Branch Station (上北沢出張所)
Tamagawa Fire Station Japanese: 玉川消防署 Hepburn: Tamagawa shōbōsho		3-1-19, Nakamachi, Setagaya-ku	None	Okusawa Branch Station (奥出張所) Yōga Branch Station (用賀出張所) Shinmachi Branch Station (新町出張所)
Seijō Fire Station Japanese: 成城消防署 Hepburn: Seijō shōbōsho		1-21-14, Seijō, Setagaya-ku	None	Chitose Branch Station (千歳出張所) Karasuyama Branch Station (烏山出張所)
Shibuya Fire Station Japanese: 渋谷消防署 Hepburn: Shibuya shōbōsho		1-8-3, Jinnan, Shibuya-ku	None	Ebisu Branch Station (恵比寿出張所) Shōtō Branch Station (松濤出張所) Yoyogi Branch Station (代々木出張所) Tomigaya Branch Station (富ヶ谷出張所) Harajuku Branch Station (原宿出張所)

The 4th Fire District Headquarters (Japanese: 第四消防方面本部, Hepburn: Dai-yon shōbō hōmen honbu), headquartered at the Totsuka Branch of Shibuya Fire Station, covers the special wards of Shinjuku, Nakano, and Suginami in the eastern Tokyo wards region. Similarly to the 3rd District, the stations in this area cover both busy nightlife areas in Shinjuku as well as sprawling residential areas out east, requiring a station-by-station focus on each specific ground's local needs.

Fire Station	Image	Address	Sub-Stations	Branch Stations
Yotsuya Fire Station Japanese: 四谷消防署 Hepburn: Yotsuya shōbōsho		3-10, Yotsuya, Shinjuku-ku	None	Shinjuku Gyo-en Branch Station (新宿御苑出張所)
Ushigome Fire Station Japanese: 牛込消防署 Hepburn: Ushigome shōbōsho		5-16, Tsukudo Hachimanchō, Shinjuku-ku	None	Waseda Branch Station (早稲田出張所)
Shinjuku Fire Station Japanese: 新宿消防署 Hepburn: Shinjuku shōbōsho		3-29-4, Hyakuninchō, Shinjuku-ku	None	Ochiai Branch Station (落合出張所) Totsuka Branch Station (戸塚出張所) Ōkubo Branch Station (大久保出張所) Nishi-Shinjuku Branch Station (西新宿出張所)
Nakano Fire Station Japanese: 中野消防署 Hepburn: Nakano shōbōsho		3-25-3, Chūō, Nakano-ku	None	Minami-Nakano Branch Station (南中野出張所) Miyazono Branch Station (宮園出張所) Higashi-Nakano Branch Station (東中野出張所)
Nogata Fire Station Japanese: 野方消防署 Hepburn: Nogata shōbōsho		2-21-1, Maruyama, Nakano-ku	None	Yamato Branch Station (大和出張所) Saginomiya Branch Station (鷺宮出張所) Ekoda Branch Station (江古田出張所)
Suginami Fire Station Japanese: 杉並消防署 Hepburn: Suginami shōbōsho		3-4-3, Asagayaminami, Nakano-ku	None	Eifuku Branch Station (永福出張所) Horinouchi Branch Station (堀ノ内出張所) Mabashi Branch Station (馬橋出張所) Asagaya Branch Station (阿佐ヶ谷出張所) Kōenji Branch Station (高円寺出張所) Takaido Branch Station (高井戸出張所)
Ogikubo Fire Station Japanese: 荻窪消防署 Hepburn: Ogikubo shōbōsho		3-4-1, Momoi, Suginami-ku	None	Nishiogi Branch Station (西荻出張所) Kugayama Branch Station (久我山出張所) Amanuma Branch Station (天沼出張所) Shimo-Igusa Branch Station (下井草出張所)

The 5th Fire District Headquarters (Japanese: 第五消防方面本部, Hepburn: Dai-go shōbō hōmen honbu), headquartered at Ikebukero Fire Station, covers the special wards of Kita, Toshima, and Bunkyō in the northern Tokyo wards region. Again, this area combines high-call volume dense urban centres such as Ikebukero with sprawling residential districts with aging populations.

Fire Station	Image	Address	Sub-Stations	Branch Stations
Koishikawa Fire Station Japanese: 小石川消防署 Hepburn: Koishikawa shōbōsho		3-3-1, Hakusan, Bunkyō-ku	None	Oimatsu Branch Station (老松出張所) Ōtsuka Branch Station (大塚出張所)
Hongō Fire Station Japanese: 本郷消防署 Hepburn: Hongō shōbōsho		7-1-11, Hongō, Bunkyō-ku	None	Komagome Branch Station (駒込出張所) Nezu Branch Station (根津出張所)
Toshima Fire Station Japanese: 豊島消防署 Hepburn: Toshima shōbōsho		3-19-20, Higashi-Ikebukero, Toshima-ku	None	Sugamo Branch Station (巣鴨出張所) Mejiro Branch Station (目白出張所)
Ikebukero Fire Station Japanese: 池袋消防署 Hepburn: Ikebukero shōbōsho		2-37-8, Nishi-Ikebukero, Toshima-ku	None	Nagasaki Branch Station (長崎出張所) Takamatsu Branch Station (高松出張所)
Ōji Fire Station Japanese: 王子消防署 Hepburn: Ōji shōbōsho		4-28-1, Ōji, Kita-ku	None	Jūjō Branch Station (十条出張所) Higashi-Jūjō Branch Station (東十条出張所)
Akabane Fire Station Japanese: 赤羽消防署 Hepburn: Akabane shōbōsho		1-10-4, Akabane Minami, Kita-ku	None	Shimo Branch Station (志茂出張所) Ukima Branch Station (浮間出張所) Nishigaoka Branch Station (西が丘出張所) Akabanedai Branch Station (赤羽台出張所)
Takinogawa Fire Station Japanese: 滝野川消防署 Hepburn: Takinogawa shōbōsho		2-1-1, Nishigahara, Kita-ku	None	Sangenya Branch Station (三軒家出張所) Tabata Branch Station (田端出張所)

The 6th Fire District Headquarters (Japanese: 第六消防方面本部, Hepburn: Dai-roku shōbō hōmen honbu), headquartered at 2-10-9, Kuramae, Taitō-ku, covers the special wards of Taitō, Adachi, and Arakawa in the north-eastern Tokyo wards region. The stations in this area face challenges in relation to the salvage of important cultural properties found in the traditional districts surrounding Asakusa, and responding to high-tourist volume areas such as Ueno Park.

Fire Station	Image	Address	Sub-Stations	Branch Stations
Ueno Fire Station Japanese: 上野消防署 Hepburn: Ueno shōbōsho		5-2-9, Higashi-Ueno, Taitō-ku	None	Shitaya Branch Station (下谷出張所) Yanaka Branch Station (谷中出張所)
Asakusa Fire Station Japanese: 浅草消防署 Hepburn: Asakusa shōbōsho		1-5-8, Komagata, Taitō-ku	None	Asakusabashi Branch Station (浅草橋出張所)
Nihonzutsumi Fire Station Japanese: 日本堤消防署 Hepburn: Nihonzutsumi shōbōsho		4-1-1, Senzoku, Taitō-ku	None	Niten-Mon Branch Station (二天門出張所) Imado Branch Station (今戸出張所)
Arakawa Fire Station Japanese: 荒川消防署 Hepburn: Arakawa shōbōsho		2-1-13, Arakawa, Arakawa-ku	None	Otonashigawa Branch Station (音無川出張所) Shioiri Branch Station (汐入出張所) Minami-Senju Branch Station (南千住出張所) Nippori Branch Station (日暮里出張所)
Ogu Fire Station Japanese: 尾久消防署 Hepburn: Ogu shōbōsho		8-44-4, Higashi-Ogu, Arakawa-ku	None	Otakebashi Branch Station (尾竹橋出張所) Shimo-Ogu Branch Station (下尾久出張所)
Senju Fire Station Japanese: 千住消防署 Hepburn: Senju shōbōsho		9-14, Senju Nakaichō, Adachi-ku	None	Asahimachi Branch Station (旭町出張所) Miyagi Branch Station (宮城出張所)
Adachi Fire Station Japanese: 足立消防署 Hepburn: Adachi shōbōsho		2-1-1, Umejima, Adachi-ku	None	Ayase Branch Station (綾瀬出張所) Fuchie Branch Station (淵江出張所) Ōyata Branch Station (大谷田出張所) Shinmei Branch Station (神明出張所)
Nishiarai Fire Station Japanese: 西新井消防署 Hepburn: Nishiarai shōbōsho		2-5-11, Ikō, Adachi-ku	None	Daishimae Branch Station (大師前出張所) Kaminumata Branch Station (上沼田出張所) Motoki Branch Station (本木出張所) Toneri Branch Station (舎人出張所)

The 7th Fire District Headquarters (Japanese: 第七消防方面本部, Hepburn: Dai-nana shōbō hōmen honbu), headquartered at the Morishita Branch of Fukagawa Fire Station, covers the special wards of Kōtō, Sumida, Edogawa, and Katsushika in the eastern Tokyo Wards region. The stations in this area have a particular focus both on flood defence and on preparing to prevent the spread of conflagrations following an earthquake; this is a result of the geography of the area, which is particularly low-lying, bound by rivers and canals, and contains a large proportion of the city's old pre-war wooden housing stock.

Fire Station	Image	Address	Sub-Stations	Branch Stations
Honjo Fire Station Japanese: 本所消防署 Hepburn: Honjo shōbōsho		4-6-6, Yokokawa, Sumida-ku	None	Kinshichō Branch Station (錦糸町出張所) Koume Branch Station (小梅出張所) Higashi-Komagata Branch Station (東駒形出張所)
Mukōjima Fire Station Japanese: 向島消防署 Hepburn: Mukōjima shōbōsho		6-22-3, Higashi-Mukōjima, Sumida-ku	None	Sumida Branch Station (墨田出張所) Tachibana Branch Station (立花出張所)
Fukagawa Fire Station Japanese: 深川消防署 Hepburn: Fukagawa shōbōsho		3-18-10, Kiba, Kōtō-ku	Ariake Sub-Station (有明分署)	Eitai Branch Station (永代出張所) Edagawa Branch Station (枝川出張所) Toyosu Branch Station (豊洲出張所) Morishita Branch Station (森下出張所)
Jōtō Fire Station Japanese: 城東消防署 Hepburn: Jōtō shōbōsho		6-42-9, Kameido, Koto-ku	None	Higashisuna Branch Station (東砂出張所) Ōshima Branch Station (大島出張所) Sunamachi Branch Station (砂町出張所)
Honda Fire Station Japanese: 本田消防署 Hepburn: Honda shōbōsho		12-7-3, Higashi-Tateishi, Katsushika-ku	None	Kamihirai Branch Station (上平井出張所) Minami-Ayase Branch Station (南綾瀬出張所) Aoto Branch Station (青戸出張所) Okuto Branch Station (奥戸出張所)
Kanamachi Fire Station Japanese: 金町消防署 Hepburn: Kanamachi shōbōsho		4-15-20, Kanamachi, Katsushika-ku	None	Kameari Branch Station (亀有出張所) Shibamata Branch Station (柴又出張所) Mizumoto Branch Station (水元出張所)
Edogawa Fire Station Japanese: 江戸川消防署 Hepburn: Edogawa shōbōsho		2-9-13, Chūō, Edogawa-ku	None	Komatsugawa Branch Station (小松川出張所) Mizue Branch Station (瑞江出張所)
Kasai Fire Station Japanese: 葛西消防署 Hepburn: Kasai shōbōsho		1-29-1, Nakakasai, Edogawa-ku	None	Funabori Branch Station (船堀出張所) Minami-Kasai Branch Station (南葛西出張所)
Koiwa Fire Station Japanese: 小岩消防署 Hepburn: Koiwa shōbōsho		2-42-11, Shishibone, Edogawa-ku	None	Minami-Koiwa Branch Station (南小岩出張所) Shinozaki Branch Station (篠崎出張所) Kita-Koiwa Branch Station (北小岩出張所)

The 8th Fire District Headquarters (Japanese: 第八消防方面本部, Hepburn: Dai-hachi shōbō hōmen honbu), headquartered at the Tachikawa Wide-Area Disaster Prevention Base, covers much of the eastern section of the Tama region, roughly corresponding to the old Kitatama District.

Fire Station	Image	Address	Sub-Stations	Branch Stations
Tachikawa Fire Station Japanese: 立川消防署 Hepburn: Tachikawa shōbōsho		1, Izumichō, Tachikawa-shi	None	Nishikichō Branch Station (錦町出張所) Kunitachi Branch Station (国立出張所) Sunagawa Branch Station (砂川出張所) Yaho Branch Station (谷保出張所)
Musashino Fire Station Japanese: 武蔵野消防署 Hepburn: Musashino shōbōsho		4-6-1, Kichijōji Kitamachi, Musashino-shi	None	Musashi-Sakai Branch Station (武蔵境出張所) Kichijōji Branch Station (吉祥寺出張所)
Mitaka Fire Station Japanese: 三鷹消防署 Hepburn: Mitaka shōbōsho		9-2-17, Shimorenjaku, Mitaka-shi	None	Shimorenjaku Branch Station (下連雀出張所) Ōsawa Branch Station (大沢出張所) Mure Branch Station (牟礼出張所)
Fuchū Fire Station Japanese: 府中消防署 Hepburn: Fuchū shōbōsho		1-5, Kotobuki-chō, Fuchū-shi	None	Bunbai Branch Station (分梅出張所) Asahi Branch Station (朝日出張所) Koremasa Branch Station (是政出張所) Sakaemachi Branch Station (栄町出張所)
Akishima Fire Station Japanese: 昭島消防署 Hepburn: Akishima shōbōsho		1-14-1, Matsubara-chō, Akishima-shi	None	Shōwa Branch Station (昭和出張所) Ōgami Branch Station (大神出張所)
Chōfu Fire Station Japanese: 調布消防署 Hepburn: Chōfu shōbōsho		1-16-1, Shimoishihara, Chōfu-shi	None	Tsutsujigaoka Branch Station (つつじヶ丘出張所) Kokuryō Branch Station (国領出張所) Jindai-ji Branch Station (深大寺出張所)
Koganei Fire Station Japanese: 小金井消防署 Hepburn: Koganei shōbōsho		6-6-1, Honchō, Koganei-shi	None	Midorimachi Branch Station (緑町出張所)
Kodaira Fire Station Japanese: 小平消防署 Hepburn: Kodaira shōbōsho		21, Nakamachi, Kodaira-shi	None	Ōgawa Branch Station (小川出張所) Hana-Koganei Branch Station (花小金井出張所)
Higashimurayama Fire Station Japanese: 東村山消防署 Hepburn: Higashimurayama shōbōsho		2-28-16, Misumi-chō, Higashimurayama-shi	None	Akitsu Branch Station (秋津出張所) Honmachi Branch Station (本町出張所)
Kokubunji Fire Station Japanese: 国分寺消防署 Hepburn: Kokubunji shōbōsho		2-2-3, Izumi-chō, Kokubunji-shi	None	Tokura Branch Station (戸倉出張所) Honda Branch Station (本多出張所)
Komae Fire Station Japanese: 狛江消防署 Hepburn: Komae shōbōsho		1-23-10 Izumihonchō, Komae-shi	None	Inokata Branch Station (猪方出張所)
Kitatama Western Fire Station Japanese: 北多摩西部消防署 Hepburn: Kitatama Seibu shōbōsho		1-956-1, Kamikitadai, Higashiyamato-shi	None	Musashimurayama Branch Station (武蔵村山出張所) Higashiyamato Branch Station (東大和出張所)
Kiyose Fire Station Japanese: 清瀬消防署 Hepburn: Kiyose shōbōsho		2-850-1, Nakakiyoto, Kiyose-shi	None	Takeoka Branch Station (竹丘出張所)
Higashikurume Fire Station Japanese: 東久留米消防署 Hepburn: Higashikurume shōbōsho		3-4-34, Saiwai-chō, Higashikurume-shi	None	Shinkawa Branch Station (新川出張所)
Nishitōkyō Fire Station Japanese: 西東京消防署 Hepburn: Nishitōkyō shōbōsho		1-1-6, Nakamachi, Nishitōkyō-shi	None	Tanashi Branch Station (田無出張所) Nishihara Branch Station (西原出張所) Hōya Branch Station (保谷出張所)

The 9th Fire District Headquarters (Japanese: 第九消防方面本部, Hepburn: Dai-kyū shōbō hōmen honbu), headquartered at the Komiya Branch of Hachiōji Fire Station, covers much of the western section of the Tama region, roughly corresponding to the old Nishitama and Minamitama districts.

Fire Station	Image	Address	Sub-Stations	Branch Stations
Hachiōji Fire Station Japanese: 八王子消防署 Hepburn: Hachiōji shōbōsho		33, Uenochō, Hachiōji-shi	Yugi Sub-Station (由木分署)	Narahara Branch Station (楢原出張所) Moto-Hachiōji Branch Station (元八王子出張所) Komiya Branch Station (小宮出張所) Asakawa Branch Station (浅川出張所) Kitano Branch Station (北野出張所) Minamino Branch Station (みなみ野出張所)
Ōme Fire Station Japanese: 青梅消防署 Hepburn: Ōme shōbōsho		3-2-5, Morooka-chō, Ōme-shi	None	Hinatawada Branch Station (日向和田出張所) Nagabuchi Branch Station (長淵出張所)
Machida Fire Station Japanese: 町田消防署 Hepburn: Machida shōbōsho		2380-3, Honmachida, Machida-shi	None	Tadao Branch Station (忠生出張所) Minami Branch Station (南出張所) Tsurukawa Branch Station (鶴川出張所) Nishi-Machida Branch Station (西町田出張所) Naruse Branch Station (成瀬出張所)
Hino Fire Station Japanese: 日野消防署 Hepburn: Hino shōbōsho		2-14-3, Shinmei, Hino-shi	None	Toyota Branch Station (豊田出張所) Takahata Branch Station (高幡出張所)
Fussa Fire Station Japanese: 福生消防署 Hepburn: Fussa shōbōsho		1072, Fussa, Fussa-shi	None	Hamura Branch Station (羽村出張所) Mizhuo Branch Station (瑞穂出張所) Kumagawa Branch Station (熊川出張所)
Tama Fire Station Japanese: 多摩消防署 Hepburn: Tama shōbōsho		1-69, Suma, Tama-shi	None	Tama Centre Branch Station (多摩センター出張所)
Akigawa Fire Station Japanese: 秋川消防署 Hepburn: Akigawa shōbōsho		466, Ina, Akiruno-shi	None	Akirudai Branch Station (秋留台出張所) Hinohara Branch Station (檜原出張所)
Okutama Fire Station Japanese: 奥多摩消防署 Hepburn: Okutama shōbōsho		952, Hikawa, Okutama-machi	None	None

The 10th Fire District Headquarters (Japanese: 第十消防方面本部, Hepburn: Dai-jū shōbō hōmen honbu), headquartered at the Kitamachi Branch of Hikarigaoka Fire Station, covers the special wards of Nerima and Itabashi in the north-western Tokyo wards region.

Fire Station	Image	Address	Sub-Stations	Branch Stations
Itabashi Fire Station Japanese: 板橋消防署 Hepburn: Itabashi shōbōsho		2-60-15, Itabashi, Itabashi-ku	None	Tokiwadai Branch Station (常盤台出張所) Komone Branch Station (小茂根出張所)
Shimura Fire Station Japanese: 志村消防署 Hepburn: Shimura shōbōsho		17-1, Aioi-chō, Itabashi-ku	None	Hasune Branch Station (蓮根出張所) Narimasu Branch Station (成増出張所) Akatsuka Branch Station (赤塚出張所) Shimura-Sakaue Branch Station (志村坂上出張所) Takashimadaira Branch Station (高島平出張所)
Nerima Fire Station Japanese: 練馬消防署 Hepburn: Nerima shōbōsho		5-1-8, Toyotama-Kita, Nerima-ku	None	Heiwadai Branch Station (平和台出張所) Nukui Branch Station (貫井出張所)
Hikarigaoka Fire Station Japanese: 光が丘消防署 Hepburn: Hikarigaoka shōbōsho		2-9-1, Hikarigaoka, Nerima-ku	None	Kitamachi Branch Station (北町出張所)
Shakujii Fire Station Japanese: 石神井消防署 Hepburn: Shakujii shōbōsho		5-16-8, Shimoishigami, Nerima-ku	None	Sekimachi Branch Station (関町出張所) Ōizumi Branch Station (大泉出張所) Ōizumi-Gakuen Branch Station (大泉学園出張所) Shakujii Park Branch Station (石神井公園出張所)

=== Other Facilities ===
The complexes surrounding Tachikawa Airfield in Tama together form the Tachikawa Wide Area Disaster Prevention Base (Japanese: 立川広域防災基地, Hepburn: Tachikawa kōiki bōsai kichi) which is home to multiple formations of both the TFD and other agencies. On the site, the TFD maintains the Tachikawa Fire Station, the Tachikwa Disaster Prevention Education Centre, the 8th Fire District Headquarters (including the 8th Fire Rescue Task Force), district training grounds, the Tama Aviation Centre, the Tama Command Team, and the Tama Disaster Emergency Information Centre (the emergency operations centre for Western Tokyo).

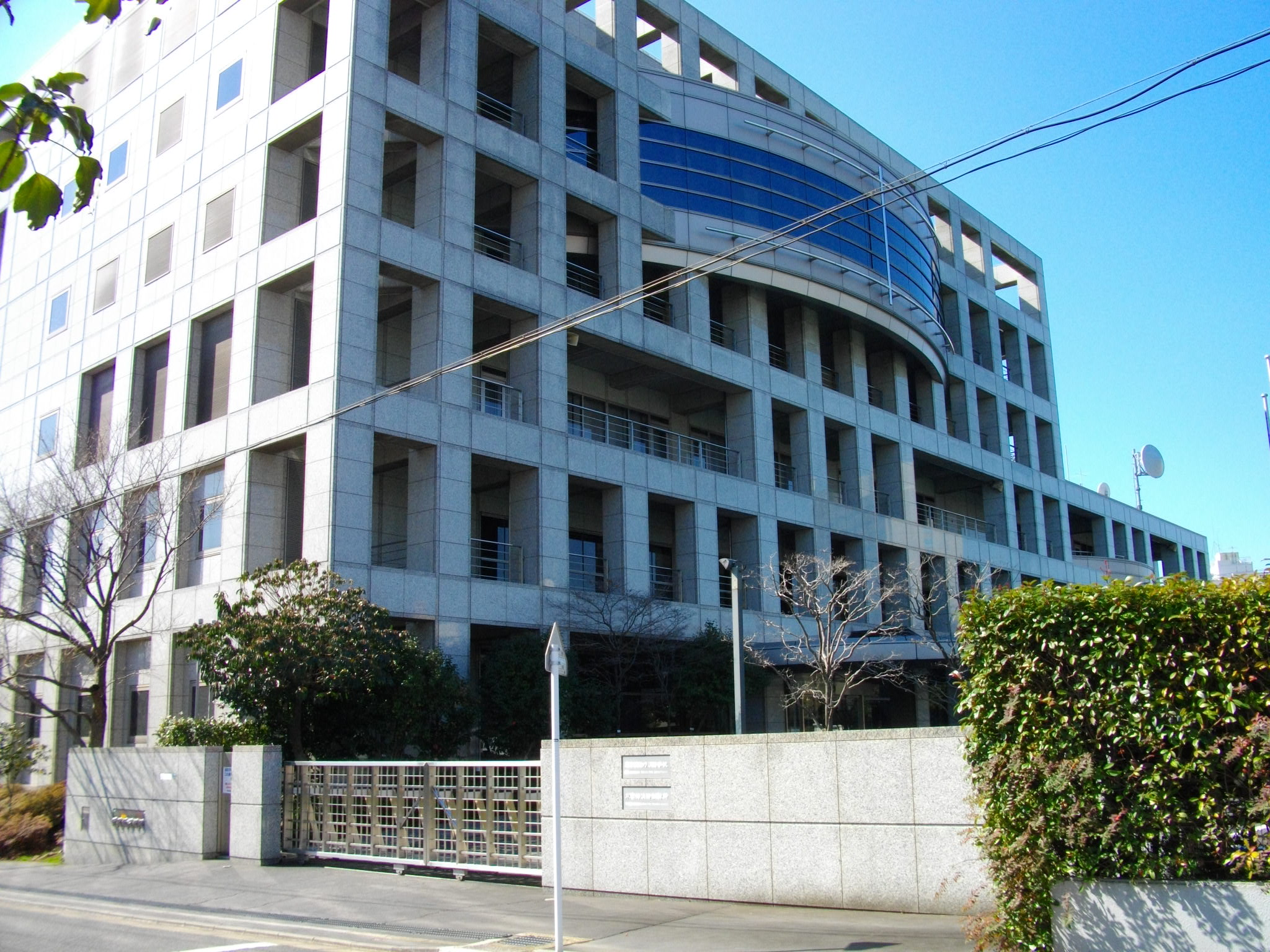
The Tokyo Fire Academy in Hatagaya

The department also operates the Minami-Tama Comprehensive Disaster Prevention Facility (Japanese: 南多摩総合防災施設, Hepburn: Minamitama sōgōbōsai shisetsu) in Hachiōji. In times of normal operation, the facility is the home of the Fire Rescue Task Force and training grounds for the 9th Fire District Headquarters, but when a major disaster occurs, the facility is designed to act as a self-sufficient base camp for rescue task forces, with on-site power, water, and sewerage, as well as reserves of water, foam, petrol, and firefighting equipment and accommodation.

As well as the large facilities in the Tama region, the TFD maintains several ancillary facilities across the 23 wards of central Tokyo; these include the Disaster Emergency Information Centre (co-located with the department headquarters in Chiyoda Ward) which receives 199 calls and is responsible for the dispatch, command, and control of units across central Tokyo, the Kōtō Aviation Centre located in Tokyo Heliport which is the base of operations for the Aviation Unit in the 23 wards, and the TFD Equipment Factory in Shibuya which is response for the maintenance of all firefighting equipment and vehicles in the TFD.

The department also operates the Tokyo Fire Academy, which is responsible for the training and continual education of firefighters from across Tokyo Metropolis, including from non-TFD municipal departments, those in Inagi City and the Tokyo Islands, and members of the volunteer fire corps. The academy, located in Shibuya Ward, delivers both classroom and practical training, including live-fire training. The Fire Rescue Task Force of the 3rd Fire District Headquarters is also based out of the site.

The TFD also rents offices in the Square Kōjimachi building in Chiyoda Ward.

== Equipment ==
The Tokyo Fire Department, as the largest in the country, has a wider range of vehicles and equipment than any other fire department, and as such has many vehicles which are unique to Tokyo and are not found in other departments or in FDMA regulations. Each vehicle and its crew is generally referred to as a platoon (小隊), with two vehicles making up a company (中隊); the vehicles draw their callsign from this structure, e.g. the first fire engine at Nerima Fire Station would be referred to on the radio as Nerima Platoon 1. Additionally, each vehicle is assigned a registration number for fleet management purposes consisting of three parts: letter(s) signifying the type of vehicle, two digits indicating which year the vehicle entered service (drawn from the Japanese era calendar system) and two or three unique numbers unique to that vehicle, e.g. the first fire engine at Nerima Fire Station may be assigned P29077, where P stands for Pump, 29 refers to the fiscal year 2017 (Heisei 29), and 077 is the unique identifying number.

=== Vehicles ===
As of 2024, the fleet consisted of 673 traditional fire engines, 91 aerial appliances, 48 foam fire engines, 9 fireboats, 7 firefighting helicopters, 393 ambulances, 50 rescue vehicles, 115 command vehicles, and 642 other vehicles.

Type of Vehicle		Image	Number	Notes
Fire Pump Car Japanese: 消防ポンプ自動車 Hepburn: Shōbō ponpu jidōsha			673 of various types, including: Standard Pump Vehicle (普通ポンプ車); Water Tank Pump Vehicle (水槽付ポンプ車); Small Pump Vehicle (小型ポンプ車)	The Water Tank Pump Vehicle has 3 versions: with a 2 tonne tank, with a 5 tonne tank, and; with an aerial platform.; The Small Pump Vehicle has 2 versions: with a hose cart; with a 980 litre tank
Ladder Car Japanese: はしご自動車 Hepburn: Hashigo jidōsha			91 of various types, including: 30-metre Ladder Car (30メートル級はしご車); 40-metre Ladder Car (40メートル級はしご車); Articulated Tip Ladder Car (先端屈折式はしご車); Mass Rescue/Wheelchair-Accessible Ladder Car (大量救出・車いす対応型はしご車); 3 Aerial Work Vehicles (空中作業車); 5 Articulated Water Cannon Vehicles (屈折放水塔車)	The 30, 40, Articulated Tip, and Mass Rescue ladders are of a traditional turntable ladder design, whereas the Aerial Work Vehicles consist of an aerial platform on an articulated boom, and the Articulated Water Cannon Vehicles consist of a fire hose nozzle also on an articulated boom. Articulated Water Cannon Vehicles also have in-built water and foam tanks and a fire pump, similarly to chemical fire engines.
Chemical Fire Engine Japanese: 化学消防車 Hepburn: Kagaku shōbō-sha			48 of various types, including: Chemical Vehicle (化学車); Large Chemical Vehicle (大型化学車)	The Large Chemical Vehicle has 2 versions: Standard (designed for fires at petrochemical installations); Airport (deployed at the Airport Sub-Station in Ōta)
Fireboat Japanese: 消防艇 Hepburn: Shōbō-tei			9 of various types, including: 1 Large Chemical Firefighting Boat (大型化学消防艇); 1 Large Fire & Rescue Boat (大型消防救助艇); 2 Chemical Firefighting Boats (化学消防艇); 4 Water Rescue Boats (水難救助艇); 1 Command Boat (指揮艇)	
Helicopter Japanese: ヘリコプター Hepburn: Herikoputā			7 of various types, including: Medium-Sized Helicopter (中型ヘリコプター); Large-Sized Helicopter (大型ヘリコプター)	
Emergency Car (Ambulance) Japanese: 救急自動車 Hepburn: Kyūkyū jidōsha			393 of various types, including: Ambulance (救急車); Electric Ambulance (電気救急車); Small Ambulance (小型救急車); Special Ambulance Type I (特殊救急車I型); Special Ambulance Type II (特殊救急車II型); Special Ambulance Type III (特殊救急車III型)	The special ambulances are operated by the Mobile Ambulance Task Force and the ambulance teams of the Fire Rescue Task Forces, and are designed to respond to HazMat/CBRN incidents, mass casualty incidents, and bariatric patients. The Type I special ambulance is a multipurpose vehicle of a microbus design; it has lifting equipment and tracks capable of hosting a bariatric stretcher or isolation pod, as well as power points for specialist hospital transfer equipment and an electric awning which can be used to establish a sheltered aid station. The Type II special ambulance, also known as a "Super Ambulance", is designed as a mobile aid station and is of a large lorry design, which expands out to provide 40 square metres of floorspace. The Type III special ambulance is designed as a negative-pressure vehicle used for the transportation of patients with high-risk infectious diseases, but due to its lorry chassis and size can also be used in a bariatric role.
Rescue Work Vehicle Japanese: 救助工作車 Hepburn: Kyūjo kōsaku-sha			50 of various types, including: Rescue Vehicle Type II (救助車 II型); Rescue Vehicle Type III (救助車III型); Rescue Vehicle Type IV (救助車IV型); Mountain Rescue Vehicle (山岳救助車); 6 Earthquake Disaster Rescue Vehicles (震災対策用救助車); 11 Task Force Rescue Vehicles (救出救助車); 4 Water Rescue Vehicles (水難救助車)	There is a variant of the Rescue Vehicle Type II which has a crane attached to the rear. The Mountain Rescue Vehicle has 3 versions: SUV; One-box van; Compact one-box van; The Task Force Rescue Vehicle has 3 versions: High-Treading Truck (高踏破); All-Terrain Vehicle (全地形活動車); High-Mobility Rescue Vehicle (高機動救助車)
Command Vehicle Japanese: 指揮車 Hepburn: Shiki-sha			115 of various types, including: 93 Command Vehicles (指揮隊車); 10 Fire District Command Vehicles (方面警防車); 7 Fire Headquarters Command Vehicles (司令車); 3 Task Force Command and Control Vehicles (指揮統制車); 2 Command Vehicles (指揮車)	It is unclear what role the 2 Command Vehicles (指揮車) play, or why thy are categorised separately.
Specialised Vehicles Japanese: 特殊車 Hepburn: Tokushu-sha	Long-Distance Large-Volume Water Transport Vehicle Japanese: 遠距離大量送水車 Hepburn: Enkyori tairyō sōsui-sha		8 of various types, including: 4 Hose Extension Vehicles (ホース延長車); 4 Water Supply Vehicles (送水車)	These vehicles operate together, with one containing long stretches of wide-bore hose and the other a high-strength water pump, allowing water to be drawn from open bodies of water (such as rivers, lakes, or the sea) and pumped significant distances to where it is needed for firefighting, somewhat analogously to the High Volume Pumps used by British fire and rescue services.
Specialised Vehicles Japanese: 特殊車 Hepburn: Tokushu-sha	Water Tank Vehicle Japanese: 水槽車 Hepburn: Suisō-sha		9 of various types, including: 10t Stainless Steel Oval Tank (ステンレス楕円型タンク); 10t PolyPropylene Box-Type Tank (PP箱型タンク)	
Specialised Vehicles Japanese: 特殊車 Hepburn: Tokushu-sha	Lighting & Power Supply Vehicle Japanese: 照明電源車 Hepburn: Shōmeidengen-sha		10 of various types, including: Standard (普通); Small Size (小型)	
Specialised Vehicles Japanese: 特殊車 Hepburn: Tokushu-sha	Special Disaster Response Vehicle Japanese: 特殊災害対策車 Hepburn: Tokushu saigai taisaku-sha		18 of various types, including: Special Disaster Response Vehicle (特殊災害対策車); Large Special Disaster Response Vehicle (大型特殊災害対策車); Decontamination Vehicle (除染車); Reconnaissance Vehicle (偵察車); High Treading Reconnaissance Vehicle (高踏破偵察車)	These vehicles are designed to respond to HazMat/CBRN emergencies.
Specialised Vehicles Japanese: 特殊車 Hepburn: Tokushu-sha	Smoke Exhaust/High Foaming Vehicle Japanese: 排煙・高発泡車 Hepburn: Haien-kō・happō-sha		3	These vehicles are designed to respond to fires in underground and confined spaces; they are capable of extracting heavy amounts of smoke from confined areas with large suction fans, creating survivable conditions for people trapped inside, as well as being capable of flooding confined spaces with high-expanding firefighting foam, extinguishing any fires without having to commit firefighters into the dangerous area.
Specialised Vehicles Japanese: 特殊車 Hepburn: Tokushu-sha	Drag Excavator (Large) Japanese: ドラッグショベル（大） Hepburn: Doraggu shoberu (dai)		4	The drag excavators have various tip attachments, including grapples, breaker drills, digger buckets, and hydraulic cutters.
Specialised Vehicles Japanese: 特殊車 Hepburn: Tokushu-sha	Drag Excavator (Small) Japanese: ドラッグショベル（小） Hepburn: Doraggu shoberu (ko)		4	The drag excavators have various tip attachments, including grapples, breaker drills, digger buckets, and hydraulic cutters.
Specialised Vehicles Japanese: 特殊車 Hepburn: Tokushu-sha	Crane Vehicle Japanese: クレーン車 Hepburn: Kurēn-sha		3	
Specialised Vehicles Japanese: 特殊車 Hepburn: Tokushu-sha	Tractor Excavator Japanese: トラクターショベル Hepburn: Torakutā shoberu		3	The tractor excavators have detachable digger bucket, bulldozer, and fork attachments.
Specialised Vehicles Japanese: 特殊車 Hepburn: Tokushu-sha	Heavy Machinery Transport Vehicle Japanese: 重機搬送車 Hepburn: Jūki hansō-sha		7	These are responsible for carrying heavy tracked equipment, such as the drag and tractor excavators, to the scene of an incident.
Specialised Vehicles Japanese: 特殊車 Hepburn: Tokushu-sha	Material Transport Vehicle Japanese: 資材搬送車 Hepburn: Shizai hansō-sha		20 of various types, including: Material Transport Vehicle (資材搬送車); Large Material Transport Vehicle (大型資材搬送車)	These vehicles can load and unload swap bodies of equipment of various types, including technical rescue, hazardous materials or flood defence equipment, foam and powder extinguishing agents, and various rescue robots.
Specialised Vehicles Japanese: 特殊車 Hepburn: Tokushu-sha	Supply Vehicle Japanese: 補給車 Hepburn: Hokyū-sha		8	Based on a microbus chassis, this vehicle is responsible for supplying meals and water to firefighters at protracted incidents.
Specialised Vehicles Japanese: 特殊車 Hepburn: Tokushu-sha	Firefighting Motorcycle Japanese: 消防活動二輪車 Hepburn: Shōbō katsudō nirin-sha		30 of various types, including: Type 1 (I型); Type 2 (II型); 10 Emergency Disaster Firefighting Motorcycles (非常用消防活動二輪車)	The TFD uses motorcycle units nicknamed "Quick Attackers" (クイックアタッカー) for fire-fighting, rescue, and medical first aid treatment. The units comprise pairs of 200cc motorcycles capable of operating in an off-road environment, with a Type 1 unit equipped with a portable impulse fire extinguishing system, and a Type 2 unit carrying simple rescue equipment and fire extinguishers.
Specialised Vehicles Japanese: 特殊車 Hepburn: Tokushu-sha	Inspection and Public Information Vehicle Japanese: 査察広報車 Hepburn: Sasatsu kōhō-sha		376	
Specialised Vehicles Japanese: 特殊車 Hepburn: Tokushu-sha	Cargo Vehicle Japanese: 貨物車 Hepburn: Kamotsu-sha		15	
Specialised Vehicles Japanese: 特殊車 Hepburn: Tokushu-sha	Others		124	

=== Robotics ===
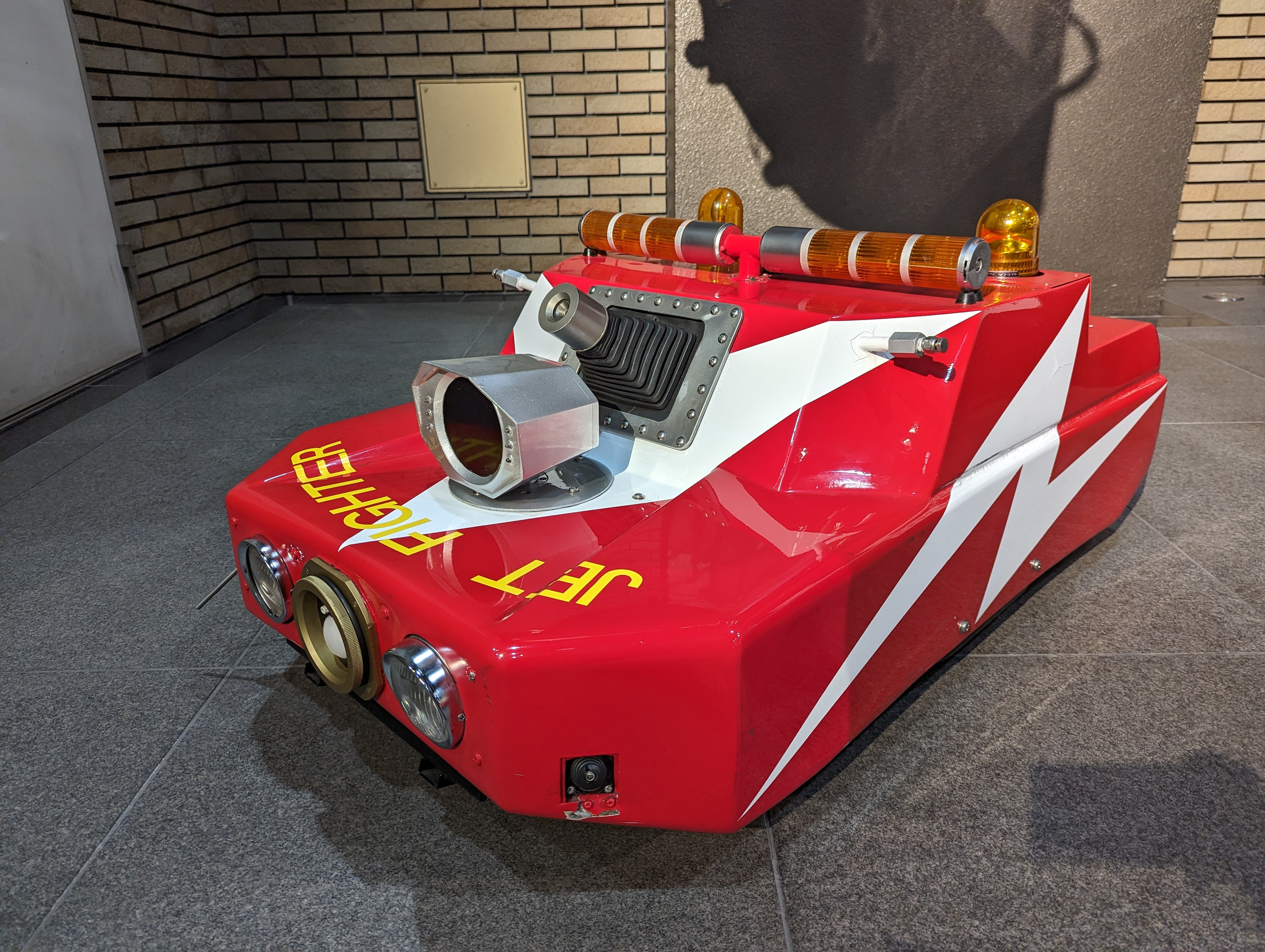
A "Jet Fighter" firefighting robot at the Tokyo Fire Museum

As the largest fire department in a country with a large robotics sector, the TFD has pushed to integrate new robots into firefighting; in 2002 the department had 14 robots of 6 distinct types in their fleet, including experimental models: 4 unmanned monitor nozzle vehicles (nicknamed "Rainbow 5"), a small remote-control firefighting vehicle (nicknamed "Jet Fighter"), a prototype large firefighting vehicle (later to become the "Dragon" Unmanned Water Discharge Vehicle), a rescue robot (nicknamed "Robocue"), 5 underwater search devices (nicknamed "Water Search"), and a reconnaissance robot (nicknamed "Fire Search").

The TFD also worked to develop a smaller and lighter water rescue robot, known as Anchor Diver III; consisting of a sensor body with a high-definition camera and sonar, and a Thruster Activated Extension tether, which connects the robot to a mother ship on the surface and contains thrusters to orient the sensor body in the direction of searching. The robot is designed to be able to search large areas of the floor of bodies of water faster than conventional divers, as well as being able to operate in worse conditions; once the Anchor Diver III robot finds a casualty, conventional divers can then follow the tether down to recover them. This robot was used by robot technicians and the JSDF in the response to the 2011 Tōhoku earthquake and tsunami to conduct seabed searches in the Watari District of Miyagi Prefecture, however the robot encountered several challenges, including a surplus of sonar signals from the amount of debris on the seafloor, and sediment kicked up from the seabed which made visual searching using the camera difficult.

The TFD continues to use robots for certain specialist firefighting operations, such as fires at petroleum installations and in response to major natural disasters. These robots include the Unmanned Water Discharge Vehicles (無人走行放水車), one nicknamed "Dragon" (ドラゴン) consisting of a large 2500kg tracked vehicle with a large firefighting monitor capable of discharging up to 5,000 L/min of foam or water; and another nicknamed "Air Core" (エアコア) consisting of a 3,970kg tracked vehicle with a large fog nozzle jet and fan capable of providing a misting jet of up to 3,500 L/min of water or 3,000 L/min of foam, as well as providing ventilation. For rescue, the department has Obstacle Removal Vehicles (障害物除去車) which can be either remotely operated or driven, and has multiple attachments to clear rubble, such as shovels, buckets, breaker drills, and grapples. The department also continues to use the "Water Search" (ウォターサーチ) underwater search devices (水中検索装置), capable of diving up to 150m deep in conditions unsuitable for conventional divers. The robots have been used in live fires by the department, including in the response to the 2024 Haneda Airport runway collision.

== Community outreach ==
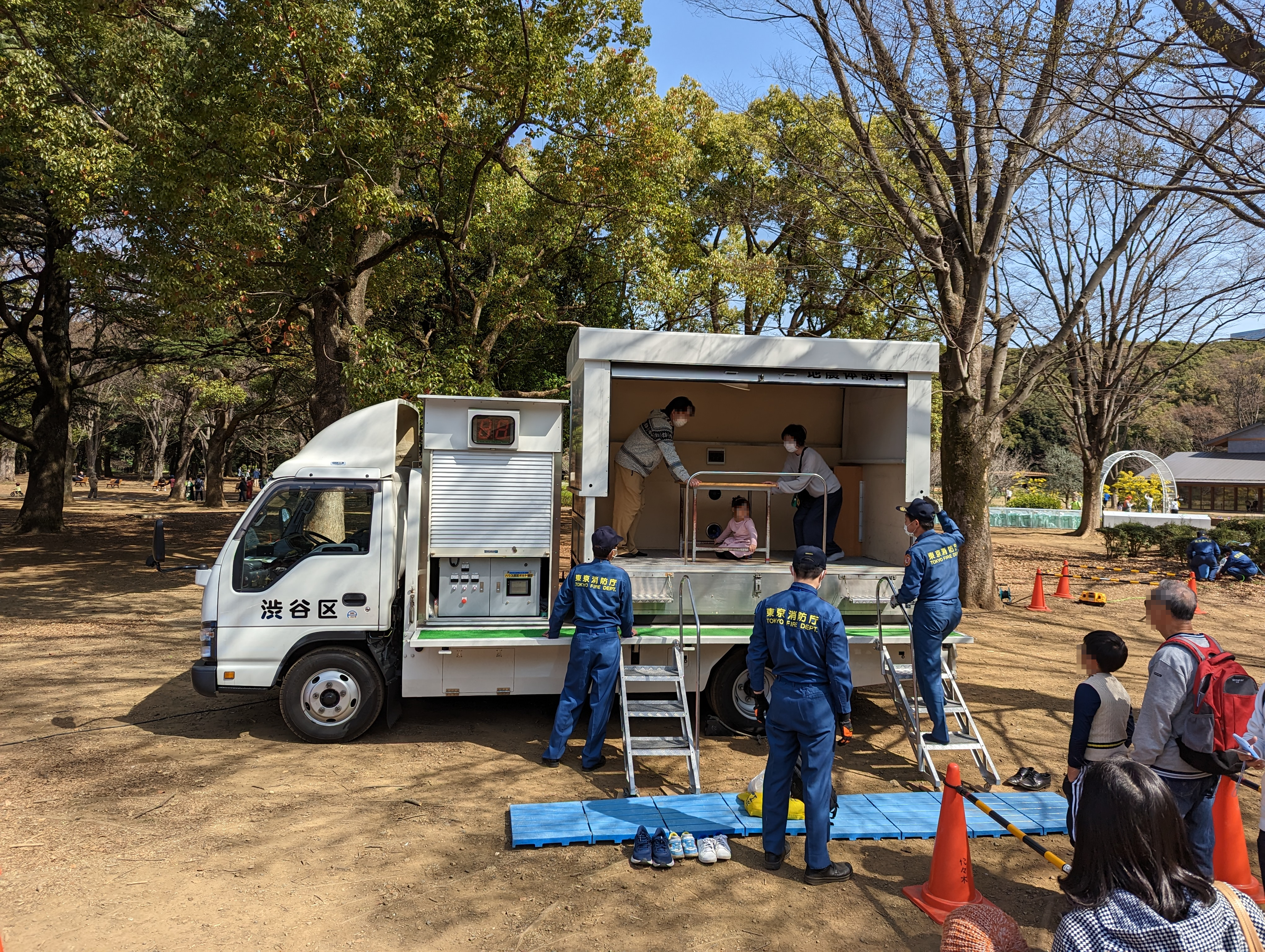
Tokyo firefighters delivering earthquake preparedness training in Yoyogi Park using an earthquake simulation truck.

The TFD is heavily involved in community outreach and education throughout Tokyo, as promotion of the Bōsai (防災) concept of disaster preparedness is considered a key responsibility of Japanese fire departments in light of the high rate of natural disasters in the country. The department has responsibility for fire prevention, and to this end conducted 36,360 fire safety inspections in FY2024; firefighters engaged in this work have legal powers to inspect most public buildings for risks to fire safety such as blocked exit routes or dangerous electrical installations, and are capable of taking regulatory action against breaches including public notification. Alternatively, premises observed to have good compliance can be issued with publicly-displayed certificates celebrating this. The TFD in particular operates a Mobile Inspection Team (Japanese: 機動査察隊, Hepburn: Kidō sasatsu-tai) which targets violations in the dense Shinjuku and Kabukichō nightlife districts. The department also routinely issues public safety information via social media, newsletters, disaster prevention handbooks, and mobile disaster education vehicles; the TFD maintains 4 types of disaster education vehicle: Earthquake Simulation vehicles, a fleet of 7 tonne vibrating trucks capable of simulating earthquakes up to level 7 on the Japan Meteorological Agency "Shindo" seismic intensity scale including historical examples such as the 2011 Tōhoku earthquake and tsunami, VR experience vehicles which can simulate earthquakes, fires, and severe weather events using virtual reality and external apparatus such as fans, heaters, and vibrating equipment, first aid education vehicles which can be used to show instructional videos and carry Resusci Anne-style CPR practice mannequins, and "Machikado" education vans, which carry hose reel equipment which learners can use to familiarise themselves with basic firefighting. Finally, the TFD also maintains a popular band and colour guard for ceremonial and public relations purposes, as well as running youth firefighting and community disaster prevention clubs for resident alongside the Volunteer Fire Corps.

Surveys conducted by the TFD in relation to public outreach have produced mixed results; the Public Opinion Poll on Fire Fighting, an annual survey which in 2024 had 1,645 respondents, found increasing awareness of disaster prevention in those surveyed, but without increased uptake of said courses, and variable change in willingness to undertake training or to intervene in an emergency. A 2016 survey of 1,887 foreign tourists also found that though around a quarter of them had experienced or witnessed an emergency during their stay, only a few (1.3%) placed an emergency call, and roughly two-thirds of those surveyed would wish to undergo short disaster preparedness training if it was available in a convenient location such as at the airport or their hotel.

=== Tokyo Fire Museum ===
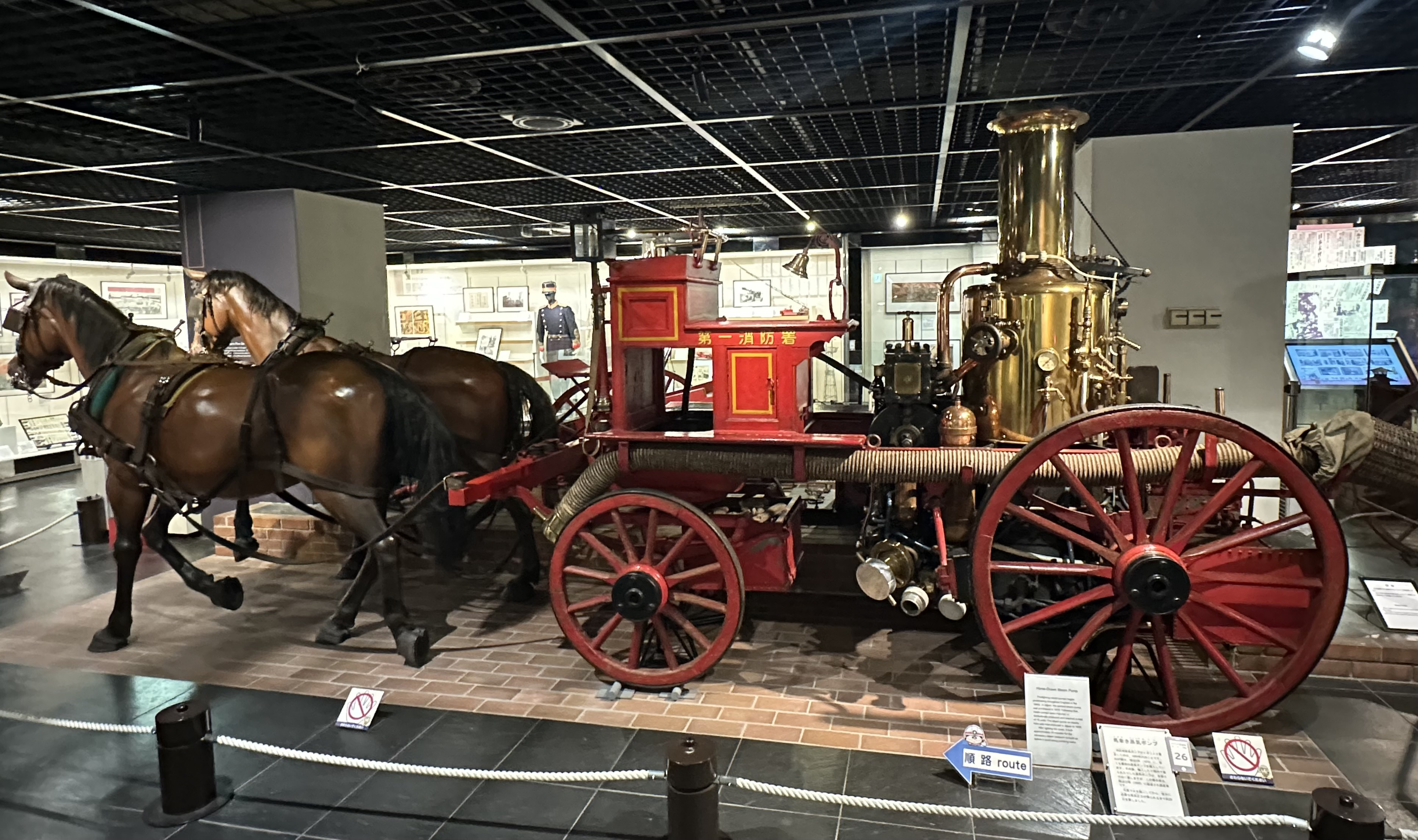
A horse-drawn firefighting pump from the Meiji Era at the Tokyo Fire Museum.

The Tokyo Fire Museum, officially called the TFD Fire and Disaster Prevention Information Centre (Japanese:東京消防庁消防防災資料センタ, Hepburn: Tōkyōshōbōchō shōbō bōsai shiryō senta), co-located with the Yotsuya Fire Station in Shinjuku, is one of the main community locations operated by the department; established in 1992, the museum is open to the public and tour groups for educational purposes, as well as acting as an academic repository detailing information about firefighting in Tokyo. The museum has in its collection over 12,000 exhibits, including firefighting equipment & vehicles from various eras, and literature & documents related to firefighting, including ancient nishiki-e (錦絵) wood block prints and karawaban (瓦版) clay block prints. The site also is home to a large library archive which can be accessed by researchers on request.

=== Life Safety Learning Centres ===
The TFD also operates three Life Safety Learning Centres in Ikebukero, Honjo, and Tachikawa. The centres offer basic disaster preparedness training to the general public, including first aid training, training on the operation of fire safety equipment, and what to do in a fire or different natural disasters; each centre has facilities for simulating different disasters such as fire, earthquake, or major storm.

== Notable incidents ==
As well as contributing in the response to national and international emergencies (through participation in the national Emergency Fire Rescue Teams and the International Rescue Team of the Japan Fire Service), the TFD has tackled various notable emergencies within Tokyo, including:

- Mitaka incident (1949) - A crash of an unmanned train into buffers killed 6 and injured 20.
- Mikawashima train crash (1962) - A three-train collision killed 160 and injured 296 others.
- Katsushima warehouse explosion (1964) - A secondary explosion of volatile materials in a warehouse fire killed 19 firefighters and injured 117 others, the deadliest incident for the TFD in their post-war history.
- 1966 Japanese airline crashes (1966) - Five crashes in the same year killed 376 and injured 7 others; the TFD responded to three of the crashes which occurred in Tokyo.
- Hotel New Japan fire (1982) - A fire caused by smoking and worsened by poor fire protection engineering killed 33 and injured 34 others; the TFD deployed 123 vehicles and 649 firefighters.
- Japan Air Lines Flight 350 crash (1982) - A deliberate crash by pilot into the Tokyo Bay killed 24 and injured 7, with 150 uninjured survivors.
- Tokyo subway sarin attack (1995) - A chemical attack on three trains killed 14 and injured 1038; response issues meant most casualties had to transport themselves to hospital, there was a significant delay in identifying the substance, and many responders were exposed.
- Naka-Meguro derailment (2000) - A train derailing on a curve was struck by another oncoming train, killing 5 and injuring 63 others.
- Myojo 56 building fire (2001) - A suspected arson attack on an entertainment building complex killed 44 and injured 3 others; it took over 5 hours for the TFD to extinguish the fire.
- Shibuya hot spring explosion (2007) - A gas explosion at a hot-spring killed 3 and injured at least 7 others; the TFD rescue operation took many hours, as only hand tools could be used due to the risk of sparks causing a secondary explosion.
- Akihabara massacre (2008) - A vehicle ramming attack and subsequent mass stabbing killed 7 and injured 11, including the perpetrator; at least 17 TFD ambulances were dispatched.
- Tokyo car attack (2019) - A vehicle ramming attack injured 9 people; a follow-up arson attack was planned, but not executed.
- Higashi-Ikebukuro runaway car crash (2019) - A runaway car colliding with pedestrians killed 2 (a mother and daughter) and injured 12 others.
- Haneda Airport runway collision (2024) - A runway collision at Haneda Airport killed 5 and injured 18 others; the TFD deployed around 70 fire appliances alongside the airport fire service.

== In popular culture ==
The TFD has periodically made appearances in popular media, both as itself in documentaries and represented in fictional pieces, including:

- 252: Seizonsha Ari (2008) - A disaster movie produced by NTV following the work of the TFD's Hyper Rescue teams responding to a catastrophic typhoon hitting Tokyo.
- Tokyo Magnitude 8.0 (2009) - A television anime series produced by Fuji TV following siblings Mirai and Yūki and their circumstantial guardian Mari dealing with the aftermath of a fictionalised South Kantō earthquake; the series features the TFD responding to the earthquake, highlighting in particular robots used by the TFD in rescue roles.
- Fire in His Fingertips (2018) - A manga series by Tanishi Kanawo exploring the romance between firefighter Sōma Mizuno and office worker Ryō Fujihashi; the series is based in Tokyo but does not explicitly name the character as part of the TFD. The series also saw two television anime adaptations.
- Firefighter Daigo: Rescuer in Orange (2020) - A manga series by Masahito Soda centred on firefighter Daigo Toake and his friends working in the TFD's rescue teams; the series is a sequel to Soda's previous manga Firefighter! Daigo of Fire Company M which was based in the fictional Sengoku City. The series also saw a television anime adaptation.
- TOKYO MER: Mobile Emergency Room (2021) - A television drama produced by TBS following the work of a new mobile medical team responding to incidents across Tokyo; members of the TFD appear frequently in supporting roles and as recurring characters.

== See also ==
- Tokyo Metropolitan Volunteer Fire Corps
- Tokyo Metropolitan Police Department
- Tokyo Metropolitan Government
