= Nakamachi =

Nakamachi may refer to:

== Places ==
- Nakamachi, Machida, a district in Machida ward in Tokyo, Japan
- Nakamachi, Setagaya, a district in Setagaya ward in Tokyo, Japan

== People ==
- Kosuke Nakamachi (中町 公祐, born 1985), a Japanese footballer
