= Tokyo Metropolitan Road and Kanagawa Prefectural Road Route 3 =

Road in Tokyo and Kanagawa Prefecture, Japan

Tokyo Metropolitan Road and Kanagawa Prefectural Road Route 3 東京都道・神奈川県道3号世田谷町田線

Route information
- Length: 27.2 km (16.9 mi)

Major junctions
- From: Sangenjaya, Setagaya, Tokyo
- To: Nakamachi, Machida, Tokyo

Location
- Country: Japan

Highway system
- National highways of Japan; Expressways of Japan

Tokyo Metropolitan Road and Kanagawa Prefectural Road Route 3 (東京都道・神奈川県道3号世田谷町田線, Tōkyōto-dō Kanagawa kendō 3-gō Setagaya Machida-sen) is a principle local road that stretches from Sangenjaya, Setagaya to Nakamachi, Machida, Tokyo. Common names include "Setagaya-dori", "Tsukui-michi" and "Tsurukawa-kaido", etc.

== Route description ==
Tokyo Metropolitan Road and Kanagawa Prefectural Road Route 3 has a total length of 27.2 kilometers (16.9 mi). The Tokyo and Kawasaki sections of the road have a length of 18,424 and 8,816 m respectively.
