= Onozuka =

Onozuka (written: 小野塚) is a Japanese surname. Notable people with the surname include:

- Ayana Onozuka (小野塚 彩那, born 1988), Japanese freestyle skier
- Hayato Onozuka (小野塚 勇人, born 1993), Japanese actor
- Takashi Onozuka (小野塚 貴志, born 1974), Japanese voice actor
