= Firefighter Daigo: Rescuer in Orange =

Japanese manga series

- First tankōbon volume cover, featuring Daigo Toake

め組の大吾 救国のオレンジ (Megumi no Daigo Kyūkoku no Orenji)
- Manga
- Written by: Masahito Soda
- Published by: Kodansha
- Magazine: Monthly Shōnen Magazine
- Original run: October 6, 2020 – present
- Volumes: 12
- Anime television series
- Directed by: Masahiko Murata
- Written by: Shinzō Fujita
- Music by: Norihito Sumitomo
- Studio: Brain's Base
- Licensed by: Crunchyroll: SEA: Medialink
- Original network: NNS (ytv, Nippon TV)
- Original run: September 30, 2023 – March 23, 2024
- Episodes: 23
- icon

Firefighter Daigo: Rescuer in Orange (Japanese: め組の大吾 救国のオレンジ, Hepburn: Megumi no Daigo Kyūkoku no Orenji) is a Japanese manga series written and illustrated by Masahito Soda. It is a sequel to Soda's Firefighter! Daigo of Fire Company M series. It has been serialized in Kodansha's shōnen manga magazine Monthly Shōnen Magazine since October 2020, with its chapters collected in 12 tankōbon volumes as of August 2025. An anime television series adaptation produced by Brain's Base aired from September 2023 to March 2024.

== Characters ==
Daigo Toake (十朱 大吾, Toake Daigo)
Voiced by: Junya Enoki
Shun Onoda (斧田 駿, Onoda Shun)
Voiced by: Taku Yashiro
Yuki Nakamura (中村 雪, Nakamura Yuki)
Voiced by: Ayane Sakura
Sadaie Matoi (纏 定家, Matoi Sadaie)
Voiced by: Yuichi Nakamura
Kyōsuke Yamagami (山上 恭介, Yamagami Kyōsuke)
Voiced by: Tetsu Inada
Hasebe (長谷部)
Voiced by: Yōhei Azakami
Watari (渡)
Voiced by: Ryota Iwasaki
Daigo Asahina (朝比奈 大吾, Asahina Daigo)
Voiced by: Katsuyuki Konishi
Shirō Amakasu (甘粕 士郎, Amakasu Shirō)
Voiced by: Takehito Koyasu
Teppei Igarashi (五十嵐 哲平, Igarashi Teppei)
Voiced by: Shunsuke Takeuchi
Riku Usui (碓井 陸, Usui Riku)
Voiced by: Takashi Onozuka
Takuto Tsubaki (椿 拓人, Tsubaki Takuto)
Voiced by: Takuya Satō
Sakura Nagata (永田 桜, Nagata Sakura)
Voiced by: Marina Inoue
Toyomu Altonen (アルトーネン 響, Arutōnen Toyomu)
Voiced by: Yoko Hikasa
Hiromi Kittaka (橘高 洋海, Kittaka Hiromi)
Voiced by: Kōhei Amasaki
Narrator (ナレーション, Narēshon)
Voiced by: Kenjiro Tsuda

== Media ==
=== Manga ===
Written and illustrated by Masahito Soda, with the assistance of Kuro Tomiyama, Firefighter Daigo: Rescuer in Orange started in Kodansha's shōnen manga magazine Monthly Shōnen Magazine on October 6, 2020. The manga finished its first part on February 6, 2024, and it was announced that the manga would enter on hiatus before starting the second part. It resumed in May 2024 and in October 2025 it was announced that the manga would enter indefinite hiatus. Kodansha has collected its chapters into individual tankōbon volumes. The first volume was released on April 16, 2021. As of August 12, 2025, twelve volumes have been released.

==== Volumes ====
No.	Japanese release date	Japanese ISBN
1	April 16, 2021	978-4-06-521831-0
2	June 17, 2021	978-4-06-523730-4
3	October 15, 2021	978-4-06-524700-6
4	February 17, 2022	978-4-06-526467-6
5	August 17, 2022	978-4-06-528610-4
6	December 15, 2022	978-4-06-529757-5
7	May 17, 2023	978-4-06-531664-1
8	October 17, 2023	978-4-06-533060-9
9	February 16, 2024	978-4-06-534340-1
10	August 16, 2024	978-4-06-536254-9
11	February 17, 2025	978-4-06-538451-0
12	August 12, 2025	978-4-06-540841-4

=== Anime ===
An anime television series adaptation was announced in December 2022. It is produced by Brain's Base and directed by Masahiko Murata, with scripts supervised by Shinzō Fujita, character designs handled by Hitomi Tsuruta and Koji Yabuno, and music composed by Norihito Sumitomo. The series received an early screening at Anime Expo on July 3, 2023, and aired from September 30, 2023, to March 23, 2024, on all NNS affiliates, including ytv and Nippon TV. The main opening theme song is "Anthropos" by Kanjani Eight, while the first ending theme song is "Perfect World" by LMYK, and the second ending theme song is "Mission" by Mika Nakashima.

On the occasion of the Autumn Fire Prevention Campaign and to promote the series, voice actors Junya Enoki, Taku Yashiro, and Ayane Sakura were appointed as rescue captains for a day at the Tokyo Fire Department's Musashino fire station on November 9, 2023, where they experienced rope-crossing and water-discharge training. J Rescue Magazine featured Yuki Nakamura on the November 2023 cover, a first for Icarus Publishing Co., Ltd to feature an anime character since the magazine was first launched in 2001. It featured an interview with Ayane Sakura and a glossary containing words used in firefighting.

Crunchyroll streamed the series worldwide outside of Asia. Medialink licensed the series in Southeast Asia and is streaming it on its Ani-One Asia YouTube channel.

==== Episodes ====
No.	Title	Directed by (Note: Information is taken from the ending credits of each episode.)	Written by	Storyboarded by	Original release date
1	"The Destined Three"; Transliteration: "Unmei no Sannin" (Japanese: 運命の三人)	Masahiko Murata	Shinzō Fujita	Masahiko Murata	September 30, 2023
2	"Firefighter"; Transliteration: "Faiafaitā" (Japanese: 消防官(ファイアファイター))	Masahiko Murata	Shinzō Fujita	Masahiko Murata	October 7, 2023
3	"The God of Rescue"; Transliteration: "Kyūjo no Kami-sama" (Japanese: 救助の神様)	Kōki Onoue	Shinzō Fujita	Masahiko Murata	October 14, 2023
4	"Fuwa Special Rescue Corps"; Transliteration: "Fuwa Tokubetsu Kyūjotai" (Japanese: 不破特別救助隊)	Kōki Onoue	Shinzō Fujita	Masahiko Murata	October 21, 2023
5	"252"; Transliteration: "Yōkyūjosha" (Japanese: 252(要救助者))	Masahiko Murata	Shinzō Fujita	Masahiko Murata	October 28, 2023
6	"Toake Daigo"; Transliteration: "Toake Daigo" (Japanese: 十朱大吾)	Yoshinobu Kasai	Shinzō Fujita	Masahiko Murata	November 4, 2023
7	"My Hero"; Transliteration: "Watashi no Eiyū" (Japanese: 私の英雄)	Maki Kamiya	Yukiko Sakaue	Masayuki Miyaji	November 11, 2023
8	"The Three in the Basement"; Transliteration: "Chikashitsu no Sannin" (Japanese: 地下室の三人)	Kōki Onoue	Shinzō Fujita	Masahiko Murata	November 18, 2023
9	"Mission"; Transliteration: "Misshon" (Japanese: ミッション)	Masahiko Murata	Shinzō Fujita	Masahiko Murata	November 25, 2023
10	"The Auspicious "Fire Company M""; Transliteration: "Medetai "Megumi"" (Japanese: めでたい"め組")	Unknown	Unknown	TBA	December 2, 2023
11	"The True Sign of a Buddy"; Transliteration: "Badi no Akashi" (Japanese: バディの証)	Unknown	Unknown	TBA	December 9, 2023
12	"The Job of Those in Orange"; Transliteration: "Orenji no Shigoto" (Japanese: オレンジの仕事)	Unknown	Unknown	TBA	December 16, 2023
12.5	"The Sun Will Rise Again"; Transliteration: "Hi wa Mata Noboru" (Japanese: 陽はまた昇る)	Unknown	Unknown	TBA	December 23, 2023
13	"Their Respective Emotions"; Transliteration: "Sorezore no Omoi" (Japanese: それぞれの想い)	Unknown	Unknown	TBA	January 6, 2024
14	"The National Firefighter Rescue Technique Tournament"; Transliteration: "Zenkoku Shōbō Kyūjo Gijutsu Taikai" (Japanese: 全国消防救助技術大会)	Unknown	Unknown	TBA	January 13, 2024
15	"Special Order Dispatch"; Transliteration: "Tokumei Shutsujō" (Japanese: 特命出場)	Unknown	Unknown	TBA	January 20, 2024
16	"Morse Code"; Transliteration: "Mōrusu Shingō" (Japanese: モールス信号)	Unknown	Unknown	TBA	January 27, 2024
17	"Asahina Daigo"; Transliteration: "Asahina Daigo" (Japanese: 朝比奈大吾)	Unknown	Unknown	TBA	February 3, 2024
17.5	"Their Bond"; Transliteration: "San-nin no Enishi" (Japanese: 三人の縁(えにし))	Unknown	Unknown	TBA	February 10, 2024
18	"Team"; Transliteration: "Chīmu" (Japanese: チーム)	Unknown	Unknown	TBA	February 17, 2024
19	"Daigo's Confession"; Transliteration: "Daigo no Kokuhaku" (Japanese: 大吾の告白)	Unknown	Unknown	TBA	February 24, 2024
20	"A Small Person in Need of Rescue"; Transliteration: "Chīsana yō Kyūjosha" (Japanese: 小さな要救助者)	Unknown	Unknown	TBA	March 2, 2024
21	"The Tokyo Fire Department Public Relations Division"; Transliteration: "Tōkyō Shōbōchō Kōhōka" (Japanese: 東京消防庁広報課)	Unknown	Unknown	TBA	March 9, 2024
22	"Dust Explosion"; Transliteration: "Funjin Bakuhatsu" (Japanese: 粉塵爆発)	Unknown	Unknown	TBA	March 16, 2024
23	"The Heroes Assemble"; Transliteration: "Yūsha Tsudō" (Japanese: 勇者集う)	Unknown	Unknown	TBA	March 23, 2024

=== Other media ===
An official guidebook, titled Firefighter Daigo: Rescuer in Orange Official Guidebook – The Story of Passionate Rescue Team Members (め組の大吾 救国のオレンジ 公式ガイドブック 熱き救助隊員たちの物語, Megumi no Daigo Kyūkoku no Orenji Kōshiki Gaidobukku Atsuki Kyūjotaiin Tachi no Monogatari), was published by Kodansha on October 17, 2023.

== Reception ==
The manga was nominated for the 47th Kodansha Manga Award in the shōnen category in 2023.
