= Capeta =

Japanese manga series

- Cover of Capeta volume 1 as published by Kodansha
- Genre: Sports
- Manga
- Written by: Masahito Soda
- Published by: Kodansha
- English publisher: US: Kodansha
- Magazine: Monthly Shōnen Magazine
- Original run: March 2003 – March 2013
- Volumes: 32
- Anime television series
- Directed by: Shin Misawa
- Written by: Tsutomu Kamishiro
- Music by: Toshihiko Sahashi
- Studio: Studio Comet
- Original network: TXN (TV Tokyo)
- Original run: October 4, 2005 – September 26, 2006
- Episodes: 52

Capeta (stylized in lowercase) is a Japanese manga series written and illustrated by Masahito Soda. The manga won the Kodansha Manga Award for the shōnen category in 2005.

The series consists of three separate arcs. The first is about Capeta's first experiences with kart racing at the age of 10. The next arc, which starts four years later, deals with Capeta trying to handle his growing financial issues due to the high cost involved in kart racing. The third is about Capeta trying to realize his dream of beating his rival and becoming a professional racer, venturing through into a more senior category: Formula Three. Both the anime and manga features numerous references and homages to Initial D and Best Motoring International, as well as Formula One. In addition to this, there are many karting and racing references that not only add flesh to the story, but are also factual (such as comments about racing lines, tire usage, slipstreaming and general commentary on the world of four-wheel racing).

Kodansha published the series in English on their K Manga service.

== Plot ==
Kappeita Taira (平 勝平太, Taira Kappeita), otherwise known as "Capeta" (カペタ, Kapeta; Portuguese word for "puckish"), is a ten-year-old boy whose single-parent father, Shigei Taira (平 茂雄, Taira Shigei), works for a paving company. While completing a paving job at a go-kart track, his father sees a young boy racing at the track and is amazed at the speed and seeming thrill of the sport. Realizing that his young son has an interest in racing cars (particularly Formula One), Shigei asks the circuit steward as to whether he is able to take some old worn-down parts out of the circuit's trash pile. Taking these back to his workplace, he manages to construct a rundown yet drivable kart. Shigei's boss, Mr. Ikari, (initially begrudgingly) supplies a 4-stroke generator engine to power the kart.

In his debut race, Capeta manages to not only master the mangled racer, but also briefly overtakes Endless Autohouse's top racer Naomi Minamoto (源 奈臣, Minamoto Naomi) This infuriates his mother and team manager, Nanako Minamoto (源 奈々子, Minamoto Nanako), who scolds Naomi for pushing his kart's engine too heavily while re-passing Capeta. Nobu Andou and Monami Suzuki, Capeta's best friends, support him in his karting – Nobu as his technical assistant/manager and Monami as the self-appointed team manager.

Capeta, unaware of the difference in machinery between his own kart and Naomi's works-grade kart, does not understand why it was impossible for him to catch Naomi. Nonetheless, onlookers are amazed that a child from out of the blue is able to push his machine to such a limit, let alone unnerve the track's local hotshot. Capeta & Shige turn down an offer from Nanako to join Autohouse, instead choosing to run their own kart team as 'Team Capeta'. He goes on to participate and win a race in the SL Class beating both the drivers of Endless Autohouse Racing Team in the final lap.

Capeta, now 14 years old, has won the junior karting class he had competed in. Having stepped up to a more senior class (ICA Class), he realizes that to win races is a lot harder without the support of a well-funded team. In what he sees as his final chance – a race at the Haruna Autodrome in torrential downpour – he narrowly loses his last-lap charge to rival Ryou Shiba, fracturing his ribcage in the process. Nobu uses this race & others to prove to the officials of the Formula Stella (an indirect reference to Formula Toyota) Racing School (FSRS) that Capeta is worthy, and manages to receive enrollment paperwork for Capeta.

Capeta, despite initially having trouble even shifting a manual transmission vehicle on the first day, quickly progresses to being one of the fastest students in the school, angering Shiba, who was also chosen for the audition for his win at Haruna. Despite this, Capeta crashes with a fellow candidate on a blind corner during a time attack. Shigei reassures Capeta that he will be able to recoup the ¥1,650,000 damage costs, and Capeta chooses to continue with the audition. Shiba is chosen in the final audition to be Naomi's Formula Stella teammate, despite Capeta's great growth over the audition. Despite this setback, Formula Stella manager Kagami presents Capeta with the opportunity to race in Japan's national kart championship with Yamaha's flagship kart, which he eventually manages to win over Shiba.

Capeta later witnesses Naomi's debut win in Formula Stella, which enables him to take a test in the European Formula series, F-Gialla. Capeta is called up as a replacement for Naomi alongside Shiba, racing against new rivals in the discipline including Finnish driver Mikko Ahonen. However, his place as a driver is briefly called into question when Naomi returns as he leads the F-Stella championship – and instead of losing his spot, he replaces Shiba as Naomi's teammate. Capeta and Naomi end up colliding in the sixth race AT Suzuka Circuit, and Capeta vows to win the rest of the races to ensure Naomi's spot as champion as it would be blocking Ahonen's points gain near the end of the season.

Fulfilling this promise, Capeta is invited to a Formula 3 test as the third driver behind Ahonen and fellow Formula Stella driver Komazawa Taku. Although his times falter, it is revealed that mechanics had not taken out extra ballast from his chassis, and Stella officials Takemori & Kagami find out he would have set the fastest time had it not been for the ballast. Eventually, Capeta is chosen as a driver for Stella Team Sam's.

Capeta eventually finds himself in a new rivalry with driver Akira Kaneda, who drives for a team powered by AYK – an engine manufacturer competing with Stella for Formula 3 dominance. Throughout the season, Capeta is gradually given upgrades and hailed as Stella's ace as he competes against Kaneda and the AYK engines, eventually becoming the Japanese Formula 3 champion and earning a spot at the Macau Grand Prix, facing off against Kaneda and Naomi, who had been driving in the Formula 3 Euro Series.

During the Macau Grand Prix, Capeta, having qualified sixth manages to claw his way to third during the sprint race through a series of contacts through Lisbon corner, but is bumped by Naomi who he had passed earlier on. Capeta eventually ends up starting fifth at the final race, with Kaneda behind him and Naomi in third. During the final race, Naomi's driving forces second-position driver Martin Bussell into the wall, bringing out a safety car which brings back teammate Lindemann within Naomi's sights – inadvertently allowing Capeta to catch up to him. Capeta recalls a driving style he had utilized during karting with his old, makeshift kart and uses it to force Naomi and himself to pass teammate Lindemann in order to race for the top position. Capeta is able to keep up due to Naomi's car facing minor damage from an earlier contact, and eventually passes him on the last corner to win at Macau.

In an epilogue, Capeta, preparing for his first races at Euro F3, remarks that 'there's a million fast drivers who have never made it to Formula One, but nobody who was way faster failed to make it there."

The anime adaptation diverges from the serialization during Capeta's Formula Stella audition. Monami becomes a pop star while Nobu promises to continue being Capeta's manager as he narrowly wins the final Formula Stella audition race, and later has a kart race against Naomi at the track they had originally met at. The last episode ends with an outlook at the near future: it is narrated that Naomi and Capeta face off against one another in Formula One at the Italian Grand Prix.

== Characters ==
Capeta Taira
Capeta is 10 years old at the beginning of the anime, 14 in the 2nd arc and 16 in the 3rd arc. Capeta steps into the world of kart racing when his father fixed him a kart. Even before this, Capeta had shown an interest in cars. He is very talented, showing his adaptability, balance, and brilliance on the track. There are lot of people who are drawn to Capeta's racing and say that he gives them something to look forward to. His mother died when he was young so he did every housework from when he was little. Capeta would eventually race in Formula One. Minamoto Naomi is his greatest rival; Capeta wants to race him but feels that Minamoto is always one step ahead of him.
Sarukki
A monkey who is Capeta's pet and serves as a mascot for the team. He was originally owned by Momotarou and was named Reinhardt III. He was re-named after he took a liking to the members of Team Capeta and Momotarou decided to give the monkey to Capeta as a gift.
Taira Shigei
Father of Capeta. He works for a paving company and is mostly not home. In the beginning, he thinks that Taira is an obedient, quiet kid since he gives no trouble but after seeing him in the kart he fixed Shigei realizes that Taira was being reserved. He later supports Taira in his years of kart racing and a racer.
Monami Suzuki
A gravure idol-turned-singer and childhood friend of Capeta who calls herself the "biggest supporter" of his team.
Nobu Andou
At first, he bullied Taira because he thought it was annoying how Taira wasn't serious about anything but becomes friends with him after finally seeing him motivated. Nobu admits that he wants to become the best racing manager and that he'd always be with Capeta until the very end.
Naomi Minamoto
Naomi is only one year older than Taira. He is very serious in karts and cars. Naomi never lost in a race and is always hard on himself and to others. He realizes the unfairness in the world better than anyone else. He is convinced that he will one day reach Formula One. After seeing Taira's first race, he began to see him as his rival. Unknown to Taira, Minamoto also wishes to race against him. Though he doesn't say it, he shows great interest in Taira.
Mr Ikari
Mr Ikari is Taira Shigei's boss. He supplies Capeta's first kart engine, and supports Capeta throughout his career. He offers Capeta advice based on his own business management experience.
Ada
Ada is a sports journalist who follows Capeta's performances with passion and conviction. He has extensive knowledge of karts and sports cars.

== Episodes ==
In the anime, there are 52 episodes and each episode is called a "Lap".

1. Remove the Limiter!
2. My Kart!
3. My First Time on the Circuit!
4. Full Throttle!
5. Rival!
6. Team Capeta!
7. Entry!
8. Crash!
9. Course Record!
10. Time Trial!
11. Start!
12. Battle!
13. Team Order!
14. Winner!
15. Step Up!
16. Penalty!
17. Overtake!
18. Sponsor!
19. Festival!
20. Partner!
21. Racing History!
22. Pressure!
23. Last Chance!
24. Condition!
25. Reverse!
26. Traction!
27. Blue Flag!
28. Challenge!
29. Slick Tire!
30. Hard Rain!
31. Side by Side!
32. Final Lap!
33. Presentation!
34. Scout!
35. Performance!
36. Idling!
37. New Machine!
38. Formula Stellar!
39. First Step!
40. Shift Up!
41. Blind Corner!
42. Turning Point!
43. Hit Up!
44. Pit In!
45. Victory Road!
46. Audition!
47. Perfect Win!
48. Next Stage!
49. Versus!
50. Second Driver!
51. Red Zone!
52. Checkered Flag!
