= Bariatric ambulance =

Ambulance vehicle modified to carry the severely obese

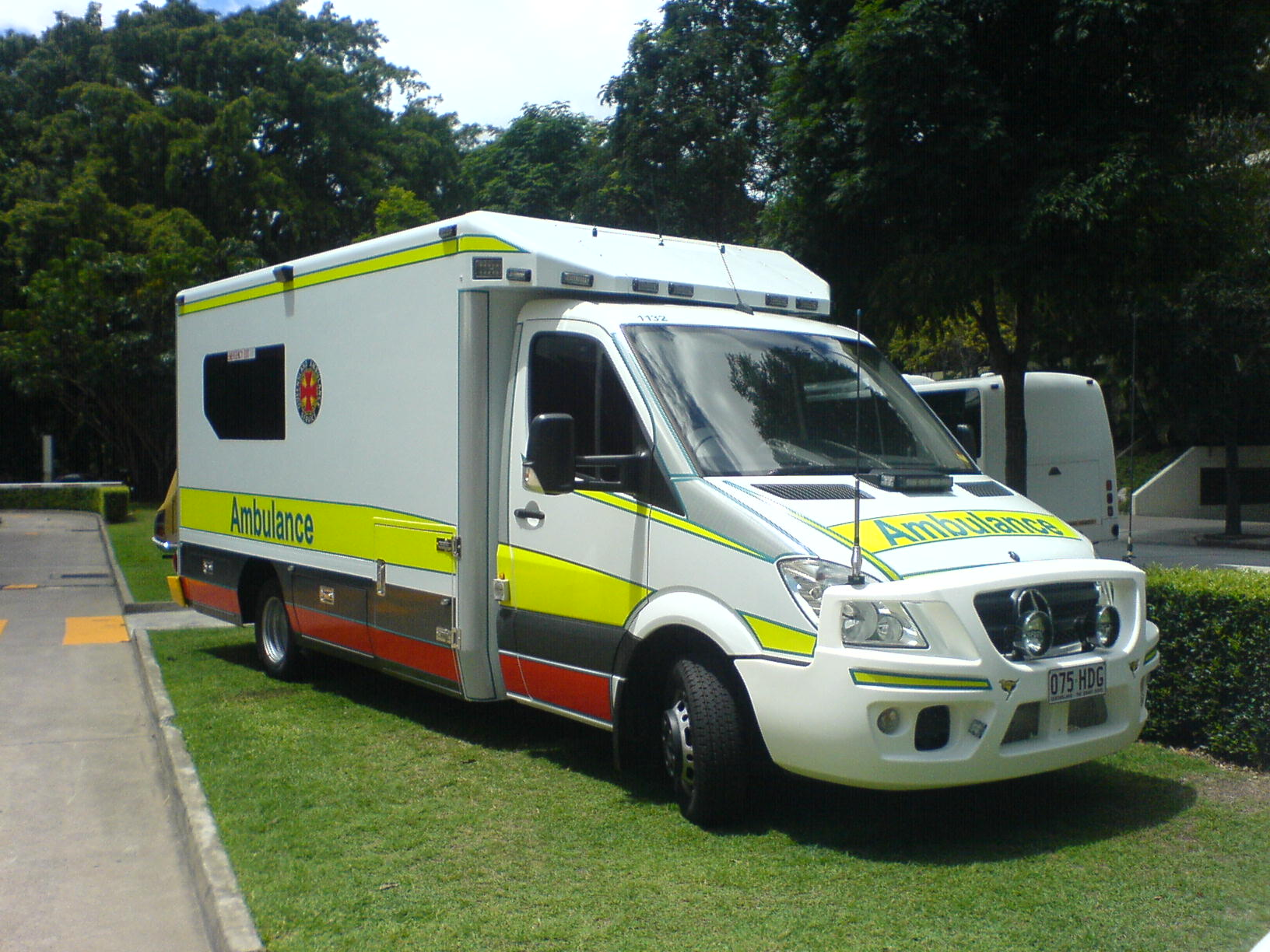
Queensland Ambulance Service bariatric ambulance

A bariatric ambulance is an ambulance vehicle modified to carry the severely obese. They have extra-wide interiors and carry "bariatric stretchers" and specialized lifting gear that is capable of carrying very large patients. They are required as a result of the increasing prevalence of obesity in the general population. Currently, there is no standardized weight capacity for bariatric ambulances, and requirements may vary in populations according to epidemiological demand. However, they are typically designed to carry weights between 350 kg (770 lb) and up to at least 450 kg (990 lb).

== See also ==
- Bariatric medicine
