= Takashi Onozuka =

Japanese voice actor

- Born: February 1, 1974 (age 52); Tokyo, Japan
- Occupation: Voice actor

Takashi Onozuka (小野塚 貴志, Onozuka Takashi; born February 1, 1974) is a Japanese voice actor affiliated with Mausu Promotion.

== Filmography ==
=== Anime ===
1999

- Devil Lady (Young Man)

2002

- Ghost in the Shell: Stand Alone Complex (Paz)
- Tokyo Underground (Henchman)
- Secret of Cerulean Sand (Jack)

2003

- Saiyuki Reload (Iwayoukai)

2004

- Ghost in the Shell: Stand Alone Complex 2nd GIG (Paz)
- Saiyuki Gunlock (Boatman)
- Mujin Wakusei Survive (Newscaster)

2005

- Gallery Fake (Keeper)

2007

- The Skull Man (Believer)
- Naruto Shippūden (Yaoki)
- Heroic Age (Colonis Special Envoy)

2008

- Rosario + Vampire (Bosaburo Taira)
- Rosario + Vampire Capu2 (Bosaburo Taira)

2009

- Slap Up Party: Arad Senki (Nathaniel)
- Kurokami The Animation (Pupil)

2010

- Chu-Bra!! (Komachi's older brother)

2011

- Cardfight!! Vanguard (Hikaru Kurosawa)

2013

- Star Blazers 2199 (Paren Nelge)
- Buddy Complex (Mikhailov)

2014

- Gundam Reconguista in G (Pilot)
- Captain Earth (Haruhiko Kariya)
- Haikyu!! (Kaname Moniwa)

2020

- Ghost in the Shell: SAC 2045 (Paz)

2023

- Firefighter Daigo: Rescuer in Orange (Riku Usui)

=== Dubbing roles ===
==== Live-action ====
- 30 Minutes or Less (Travis Cord (Nick Swardson))
- The Breakfast Club (Brian Johnson (Anthony Michael Hall))
- Captain America: The First Avenger (Footer (Jean Paul))
- Chuck (Devon Woodcomb (Ryan McPartlin))
- City of God (Buscapé (Alexandre Rodrigues))
- Drag Me to Hell (Professor Clay Dalton (Justin Long))
- The Five-Year Engagement (Alex Eilhauer (Chris Pratt))
- Gamer (Ken Castle (Michael C. Hall))
- Gossip Girl (Lord Marcus Beaton (Patrick Heusinger))
- How She Move (Quake (Brennan Gademans))
- Napoleon Dynamite (Kipling "Kip" Dynamite (Aaron Ruell))
- Oz (Kenny Wangler (J. D. Williams))
- Six Feet Under (David Fisher (Michael C. Hall))
- Power Rangers: Lost Galaxy (Damon Henderson)
- Power Rangers: Lightspeed Rescue (Damon Henderson)
- RV (Earl Gornicke (Hunter Parrish))
- Shazam! (2021 THE CINEMA edition) (Adult Freddy Freeman (Adam Brody), Sid Sivana)
- Six Feet Under (David Fisher (Michael C. Hall))
- Slumdog Millionaire (Salim K. Malik (Madhur Mittal))
- The Great Buck Howard (Troy Gable (Colin Hanks)
- The Twilight Saga: New Moon (TV Tokyo edition) (Jacob Black (Taylor Lautner))
- Wind Chill (Guy (Ashton Holmes))
- X-Men: Apocalypse (Angel (Ben Hardy))

==== Animation ====
- Teen Titans (Robin)
- Teen Titans Go! (Robin)
- The Batman (Robin/Dick Grayson)
- Young Justice (Robin/Dick Grayson)
