= Nozawa =

Nozawa (written: 野沢 or 野澤) is a Japanese surname. Notable people with the surname include:

- Charlie Nozawa (チャーリー野沢; born 1961), Japanese manga artist
- Hideyuki Nozawa (野澤 英之; born 1994), Japanese footballer
- Hisashi Nozawa (野沢 尚; 1960–2004), Japanese screenwriter and mystery novelist
- Masako Nozawa (野沢 雅子; born 1936), Japanese voice actress and actress affiliated with, and chairman of, Office Nozawa
- Nachi Nozawa (野沢 那智; 1938–2010), Japanese voice actor, actor, and director from Tokyo
- Nozawa Boncho (野沢 凡兆; 1640–1714), Japanese haikai poet
- Sakiko Nozawa (野沢 咲子; born 1961), Japanese gymnast
- Takuya Nozawa (野沢 拓也; born 1981), Japanese football player
- Yosuke Nozawa (野澤 洋輔; born 1979), Japanese football player
- Yukari Nozawa (野沢 由香里; born 1957), Japanese actress and voice actress affiliated with Seinenza Theater Company
