= Sangenjaya =

Sangenjaya 三軒茶屋
- District
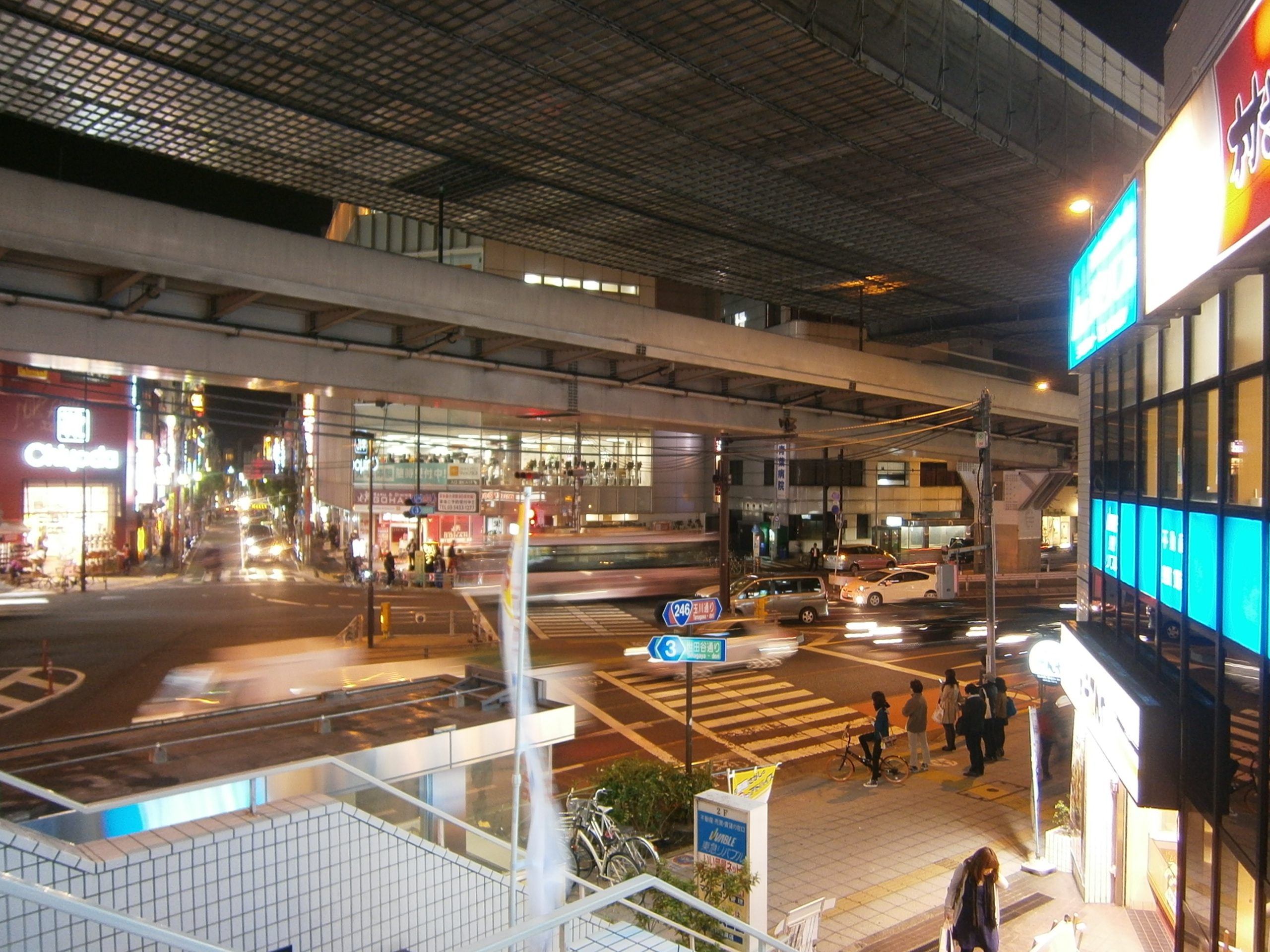
- Sangenjaya intersection

- Location within Special wards of Tokyo Location within Tokyo
- Coordinates: 35°38′34.67″N 139°40′11.82″E
- Country: Japan
- City: Tokyo
- Ward: Setagaya

Population (September 1, 2019)
  - Total: 13,108
- Time zone: UTC+9 (JST)
- Postal code: 154-0024
- Area code: 03

Sangenjaya (三軒茶屋) is a district of Setagaya, Tokyo, Japan. It is also known as Sancha (三茶) for short. It is home to many bars, cafes and restaurants. Some major streets include National Route 246, Setagaya-dori and Chazawara-dori.

== Description ==
Sangenjaya, located in Setagaya Ward, is one of the well-known commercial areas and, like Jiyugaoka and Kichijoji, often ranks high on lists of "most desirable places to live". Its proximity to Shibuya, reputation as a neighborhood where many celebrities reside, and its influence on the cafe boom have led to it being described as a "fashionable" and "trendy" area. The neighborhood also retains a retro charm with its Eko Nakamise shopping street and Suzuran Street near the station.

The Carrot Tower, a mixed-use building constructed as part of urban redevelopment projects, serves as a landmark near Sangen-jaya Station on the Tokyu Den-en-toshi Line and Tokyu Setagaya Line, though it is officially located in Taishido, not Sangenjaya.

== Geography ==
Located in the central part of Setagaya Ward, Tokyo, it is bordered by Shimo-Meguro to the east, Nozawa, Kamimeguro to the south, Wakabayashi to the north, and Taishido to the north.

== History ==
Formerly part of Nakahikizawa Village, Shimo-Hikizawa Village, Taishido Village, etc., within Ebara District. Sangenjaya was officially designated as a place name with the establishment of Setagaya Ward in 1932 (Showa 7).

=== Origin of the Name ===
The name "Sangen-jaya" (literally "three tea houses") derives from the presence of three tea houses, Shigaraki (later Ishibashirou), Sumiya, and Tanakaya, located near the bifurcation of the Oyama Road and Noborito Road, bustling with the temple visitation boom from the mid-Edo period. This name had already become common by the early 1800s.

== Education ==
Setagaya Board of Education operates public elementary and junior high schools.

Sangenjaya 1-chome is zoned to Nakazato Elementary School (中里小学校) and Mishuku Junior High School (三宿中学校). Sangenjaya 2-chome is zoned to Sangenjaya Elementary School (三軒茶屋小学校) and Komazawa Junior High School (駒沢中学校).

== Transport ==
Sangen-jaya Station on the Den-en-toshi Line is located at the north end of this district.

== In popular culture ==
The area is the basis for a district called Yongen-Jaya in the video game Persona 5 and its spin-offs, just outside of Shibuya. Sangenjaya was also featured in the TV Drama Tokyo Girl (2016 TV series) as the neighborhood of the protagonist.
