= Masahito Soda =

Japanese manga artist (born 1968)

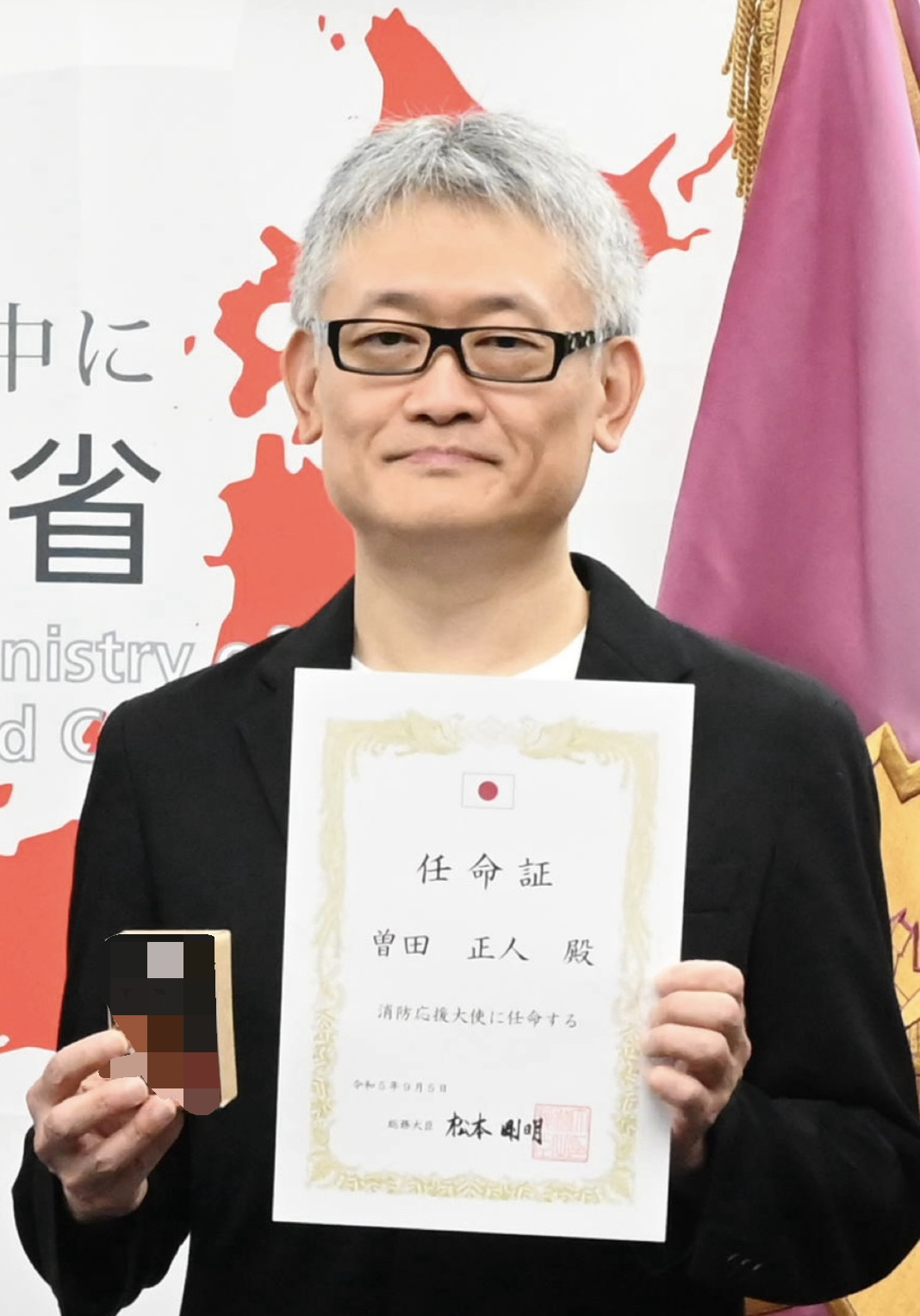
Masahito Soda

Masahito Soda (曽田 正人, Soda Masahito, born June 18, 1968, in Bunkyō, Japan) is a Japanese manga artist. Soda studied at Nihon University, but left prior to graduating. He worked as an assistant for Taku Kitazaki, and debuted in 1990 with GET ROCK, published in Magazine Special. His most notable series are Firefighter! Daigo of Fire Company M and Subaru.

In 1997 Soda won the Shogakukan Manga Award for Firefighter! Daigo of Fire Company M, and in 2005 he won the Kodansha Manga Award for Capeta.

== Selected works ==
- Get Rock — Published in Kodansha's Magazine Special (1990)
- Shakariki! (シャカリキ!) — Published in Akita Shoten's Weekly Shōnen Champion (1992–1995)
- Firefighter! Daigo of Fire Company M — Published in Shogakukan's Weekly Shōnen Sunday (1995–1999)
  - Firefighter Daigo: Rescuer in Orange — Published in Kodansha's Monthly Shōnen Magazine (2020–present)
- Subaru (昴) published in Shogakukan's Big Comic Spirits (1999–2002)
  - Moon: Subaru Solitude Standing — Published in Shogakukan's Big Comic Spirits (2007–2011)
- Capeta — Published in Kodansha's Monthly Shōnen Magazine (2003–2013)
- The Tenth Prism (テンプリズム) — Published in Big Comic Spirits (2014–2015) and Comic Shogakukan Books website (2015–2017)
- Change! – Published in Kodansha's Monthly Shōnen Magazine (2017–2019)

== Art books ==
- Masahito Soda's Collection Fire and Forget (曽田正人作品集 FIRE AND FORGET)
- SUBARU Masahito Soda Collection (SUBARU 曽田正人作画集)
- Capeta: The Guidebook
