= Firefighter! Daigo of Fire Company M =

Japanese manga series

- First tankōbon volume cover, featuring Daigo Asahina

め組の大吾 (Megumi no Daigo)
- Genre: Drama; Thriller
- Manga
- Written by: Masahito Soda
- Published by: Shogakukan
- English publisher: NA: Viz Media
- Imprint: Shōnen Sunday Comics
- Magazine: Weekly Shōnen Sunday
- Original run: September 6, 1995 – June 16, 1999
- Volumes: 20
- Anime film
- Directed by: Susumu Nishizawa
- Music by: Shirō Hamaguchi
- Studio: Sunrise
- Released: July 27, 1999
- Runtime: 45 minutes
- Television drama

Fire Boys
- Directed by: Go Shichitaka; Take Narita; Hirosuke Mitake; Taro Kinoshita; Osamu Yonekawa; Ryouichi Tanaka
- Written by: Tomoko Yoshida
- Music by: Naoki Satō
- Studio: Fuji Television
- Original network: FNS (Fuji TV)
- Original run: January 6, 2004 – March 16, 2004
- Episodes: 11
- Sequel
- Firefighter Daigo: Rescuer in Orange (2020–present)
- icon

Firefighter! Daigo of Fire Company M (Japanese: め組の大吾, Hepburn: Megumi no Daigo) is a Japanese manga series written and illustrated by Masahito Soda. It was serialized in Shogakukan's shōnen manga magazine Weekly Shōnen Sunday from September 1995 to June 1999, with its chapters collected in 20 tankōbon volumes.

The manga has been licensed in North America by Viz Media. An anime film produced by Sunrise was released in July 1999. A television drama adaptation, titled Fire Boys, was broadcast on Fuji Television and its affiliates from January to March 2004. A manga sequel, titled Firefighter Daigo: Rescuer in Orange, started in Kodansha's Monthly Shōnen Magazine in October 2020.

In 1996, Daigo of Fire Company M won the 42nd Shogakukan Manga Award in the shōnen category. By December 2022, the manga had over 14 million copies in circulation.

== Plot ==
As a child, Daigo Asahina's life was saved by a fireman. He grew up and never forgot the brave, nameless man who rescued and inspired him to become a firefighter himself. Now as a firefighter in training at Medaka-Ga-Hama Fire Station in Sengoku City, Daigo must grow up quickly, learn the ropes, and find out if he truly has what it takes to become a heroic fireman.

== Characters ==
Daigo Asahina (朝比奈 大吾, Asahina Daigo)
Voiced by: Wataru Takagi
An 18-year-old young man who thinks he knows everything about firefighting. However, he quickly learns that it is more harsh and dangerous than he thought. After his first day, he vows to change his ways and become a true firefighter.
Shunsuke Gomi (五味 俊介, Gomi Shunsuke)
Voiced by: Yusaku Yara
The captain of Fire Company M whose easy-going attitude is initially off-putting to the overzealous Daigo.
Shizuka Ochiai (落合 静香, Ochiai Shizuka)
Voiced by: Kikuko Inoue
Daigo's high school teacher who continues to offer encouragement even though he is no longer her student. She treats him as though he is her little brother, though Daigo has feelings for her.
Shirō Amakasu (甘粕 士郎, Amakasu Shirō)
Voiced by: Kazuya Ichijō
Daigo's serious-minded rival at Kujiradai Fire Station, one of the busiest stations in the area.

== Media ==
=== Manga ===
Written and illustrated by Masahito Soda, Firefighter! Daigo of Fire Company M was serialized in Shogakukan's shōnen manga magazine Weekly Shōnen Sunday from September 6, 1995, to June 16, 1999. Shogakukan collected its chapters in twenty tankōbon volumes, released from January 18, 1996, to August 7, 1999. Shogakukan republished the series into eleven bunkoban volumes from October 4, 2005, to May 13, 2006.

In North America, Viz Media licensed the manga for English language release. The twenty volumes were released from December 10, 2002, to November 13, 2007. In December 2013, Viz Media published the series digitally on their platform.

A sequel, titled Firefighter Daigo: Rescuer in Orange, started in Kodansha's Monthly Shōnen Magazine on October 6, 2020.

==== Volumes ====
No.	Original release date	Original ISBN	English release date	English ISBN
1	January 18, 1996	4-09-123681-2	December 10, 2002 (LR); July 1, 2003 (RL)	978-1-56931-860-7 (LR); 978-1-56931-955-0 (RL)
2	March 18, 1996	4-09-12368-2-0	March 1, 2003	978-1-56931-879-9
3	June 18, 1996	4-09-123683-9	June 1, 2003	978-1-56931-881-2
4	August 10, 1996	4-09-123684-7	September 10, 2003	978-1-56931-991-8
5	August 10, 1996	4-09-123685-5	December 3, 2003	978-1-59116-093-9
6	February 18, 1997	4-09-123686-3	March 3, 2004	978-1-59116-137-0
7	April 18, 1997	4-09-123687-1	June 9, 2004	978-1-59116-315-2
8	June 18, 1997	4-09-123688-X	August 31, 2004	978-1-59116-464-7
9	September 18, 1997	4-09-123689-8	December 14, 2004	978-1-59116-634-4
10	November 18, 1997	4-09-123690-1	March 15, 2005	978-1-59116-635-1
11	February 18, 1998	4-09-125341-5	June 7, 2005	978-1-59116-795-2
12	April 18, 1998	4-09-125342-3	September 6, 2005	978-1-59116-980-2
13	June 18, 1998	4-09-125343-1	December 13, 2005	978-1-4215-0130-7
14	September 18, 1998	4-09-125344-X	March 14, 2006	978-1-4215-0318-9
15	December 10, 1998	4-09-125345-8	June 13, 2006	978-1-4215-0451-3
16	March 18, 1999	4-09-125346-6	September 12, 2006	978-1-4215-0452-0
17	April 17, 1999	4-09-125347-4	December 12, 2006	978-1-4215-0453-7
18	June 16, 1999	4-09-125348-2	March 13, 2007	978-1-4215-0890-0
19	July 17, 1999	4-09-125349-0	July 10, 2007	978-1-4215-0891-7
20	August 7, 1999	4-09-125350-4	November 13, 2007	978-1-4215-0892-4

=== Anime film ===
An anime film produced by Sunrise premiered on July 27, 1999.

=== Drama ===
An 11-episode television drama adaptation titled Fire Boys (Japanese: FIRE BOYS ～め組の大吾～, Hepburn: Fire Boys: Megumi no Daigo) was broadcast on Fuji Television and its affiliates from January 6 to March 16, 2004.

== Reception ==
By December 2022, the manga had over 14 million copies in circulation.

Daigo of Fire Company M won the 42nd Shogakukan Manga Award in the shōnen category in 1996. The manga was awarded an Excellence Award in the Manga Division at the 2nd Japan Media Arts Festival in 1998.
