= Nakamachi, Machida =

Nakamachi 中町
- District
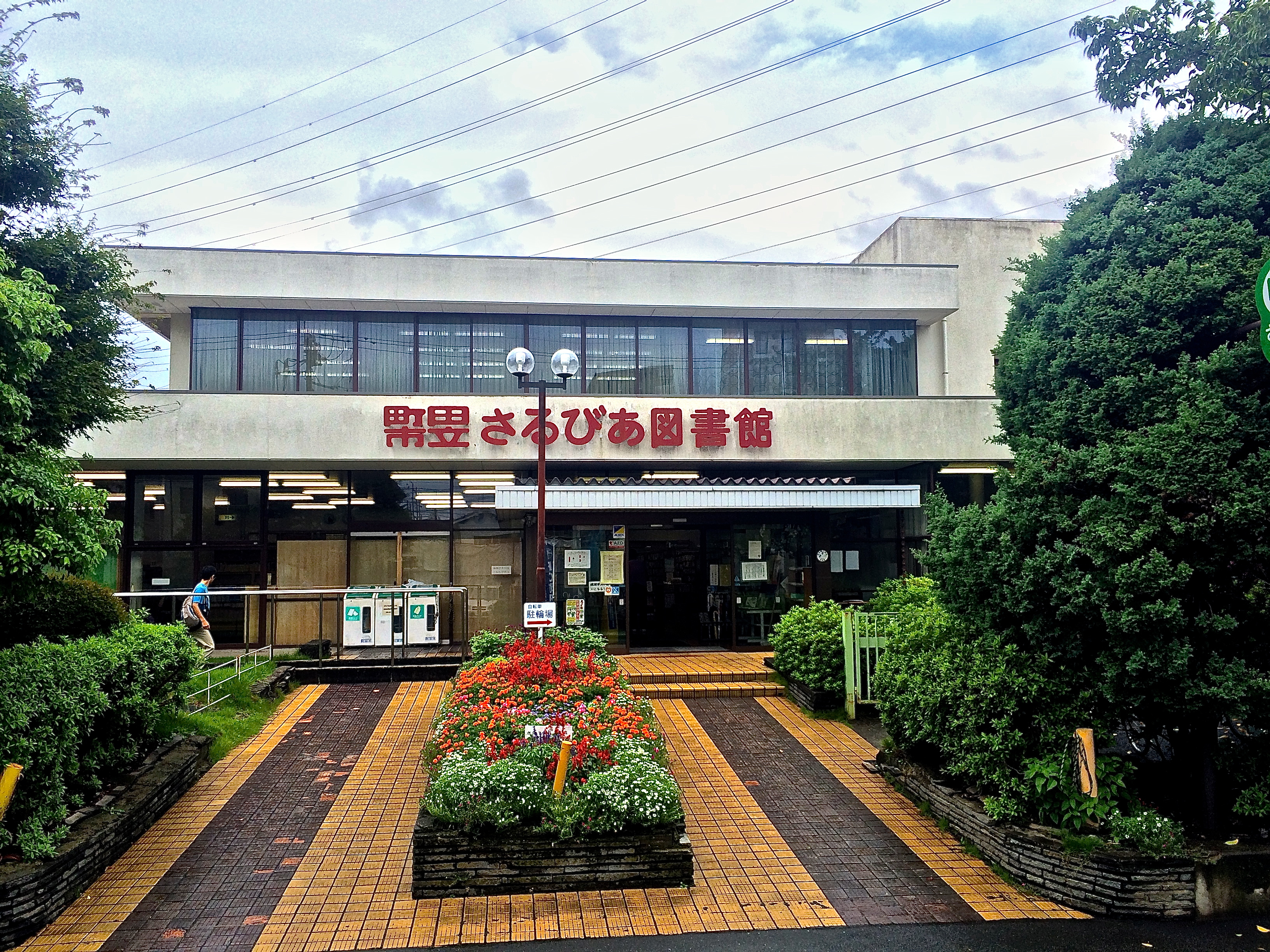
- Building of Machida City Salvia Library.

- Location within Tokyo
- Coordinates: 35°32′59.51″N 139°26′51.52″E
- Country: Japan
- Prefecture: Tokyo
- City: Machida

Population (January 1, 2018)
  - Total: 9,603
- Time zone: UTC+9 (JST)
- Postal code: 194-0021
- Area code: 042

Nakamachi (中町) is a district of Machida, Tokyo, Japan. The current administrative place names are Nakamachi 1-chome to 4-chome.
