= Nakamachi, Setagaya =

Nakamachi 中町
- District
- Location within Special wards of Tokyo Location within Tokyo
- Coordinates: 35°37′8.46″N 139°38′34.8″E
- Country: Japan
- City: Tokyo
- Ward: Setagaya

Population (September 1, 2019)
  - Total: 14,255
- Time zone: UTC+9 (JST)
- Postal code: 158-0091
- Area code: 03

Nakamachi (中町) is a district of Setagaya, Tokyo, Japan.

== Education ==
Setagaya Board of Education operates public elementary and junior high schools.

1 and 2-chome are zoned to Tamagawa Elementary School (玉川小学校). 3, 4, and parts of 5-chome are zoned to Nakamachi Elementary School (中町小学校). Other parts of 5-chome are zoned to Sakuramachi Elementary School (桜町小学校). 1-4 chome and parts of 5 chome are zoned to Tamagawa Junior High School (玉川中学校), while other parts of 5-chome are zoned to Fukasawa Junior High School (深沢中学校).
