= Tokyo =

Capital and most populous city of Japan

Tokyo 東京都
- Capital city and metropolis
- Tokyo Metropolis
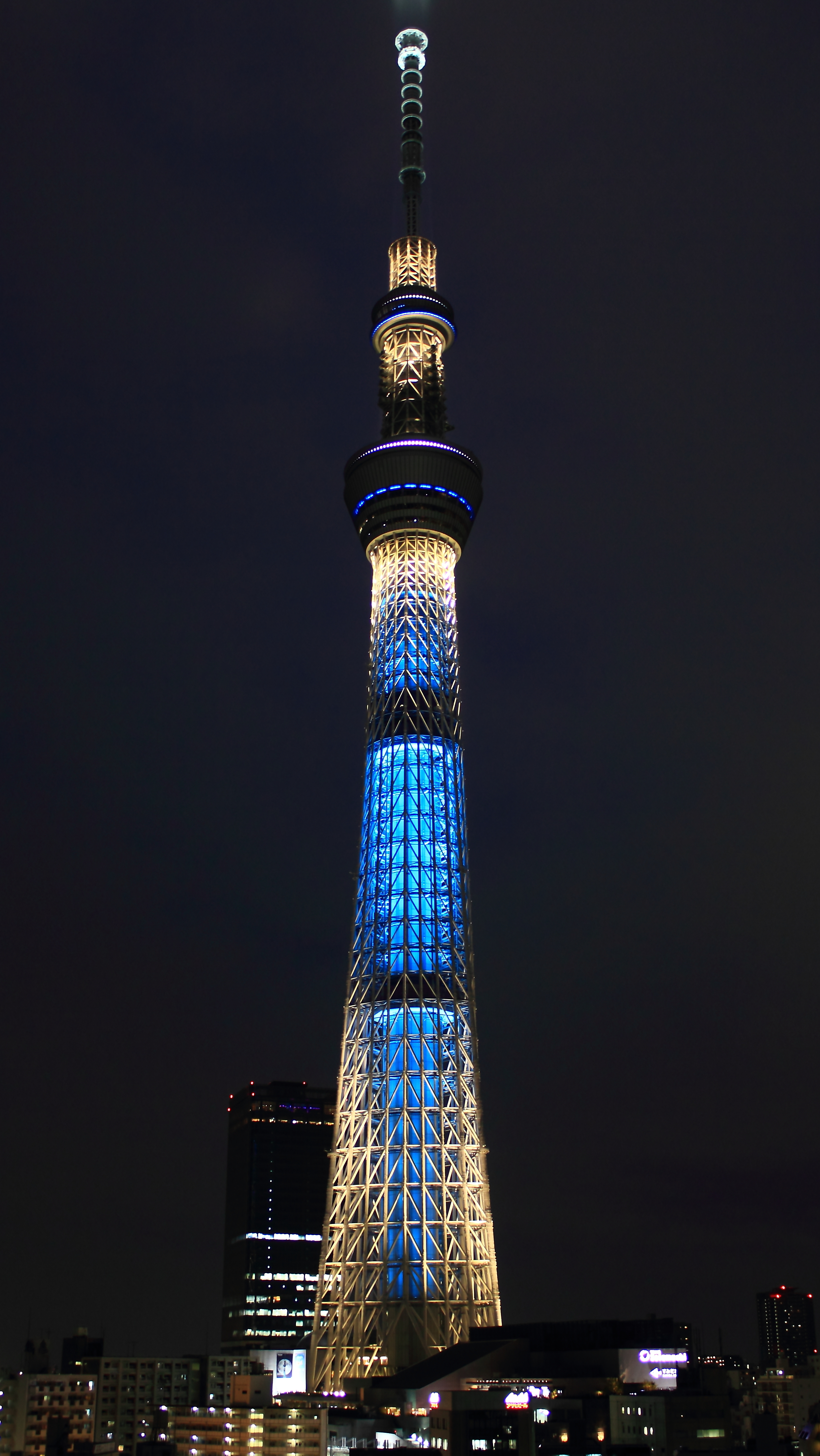
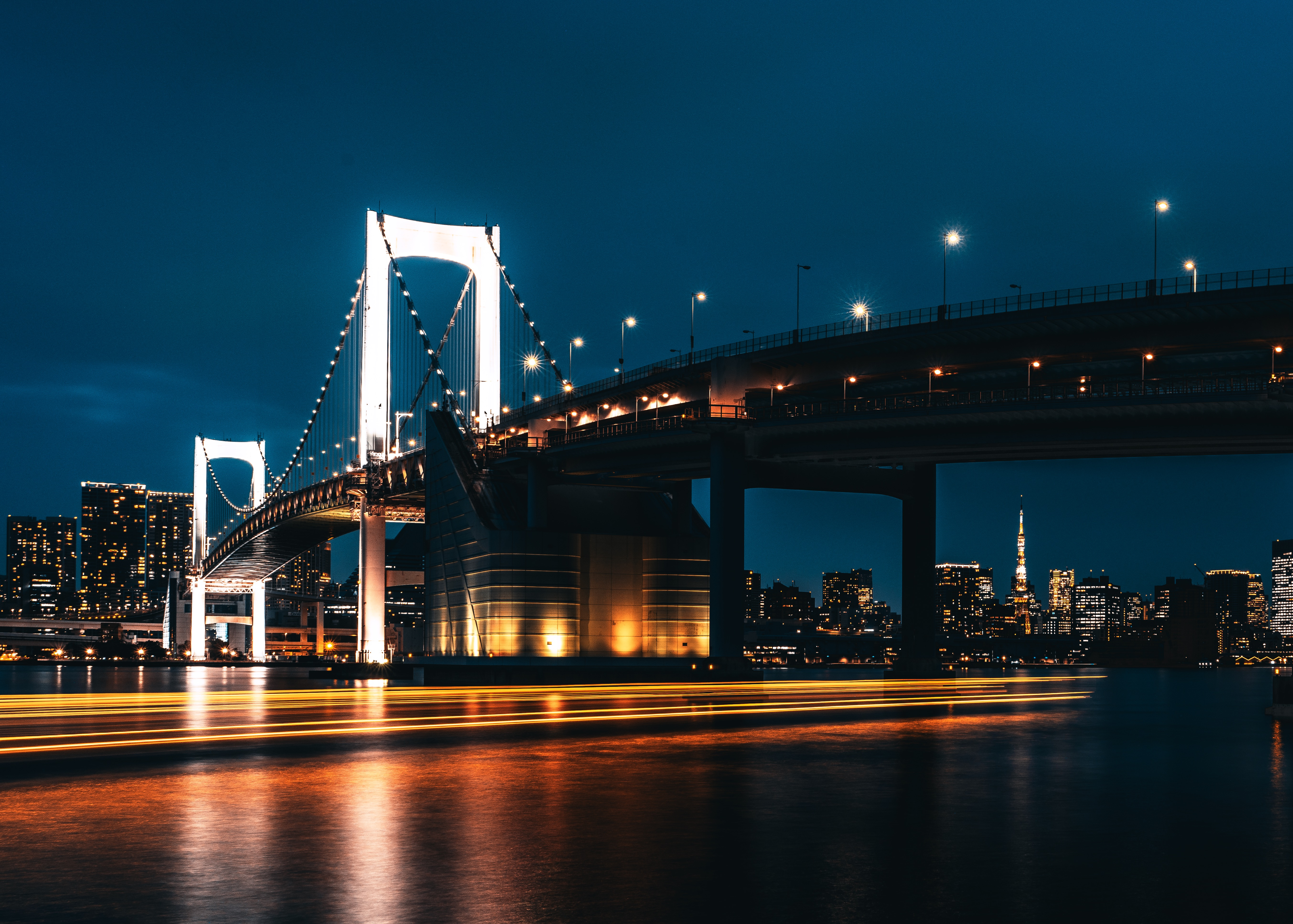
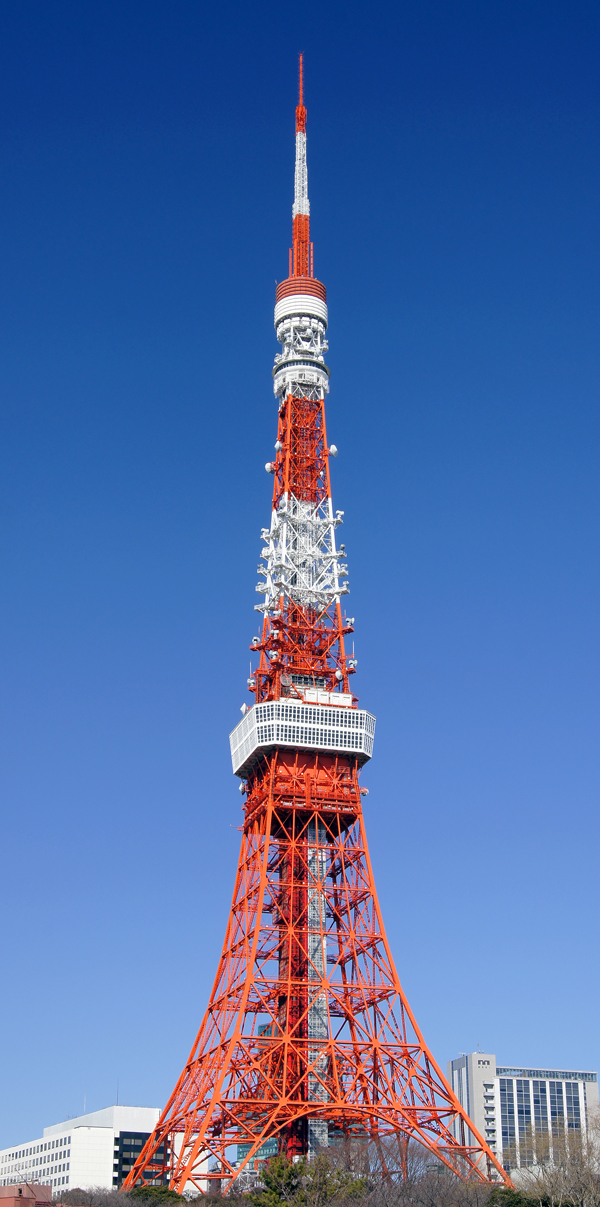
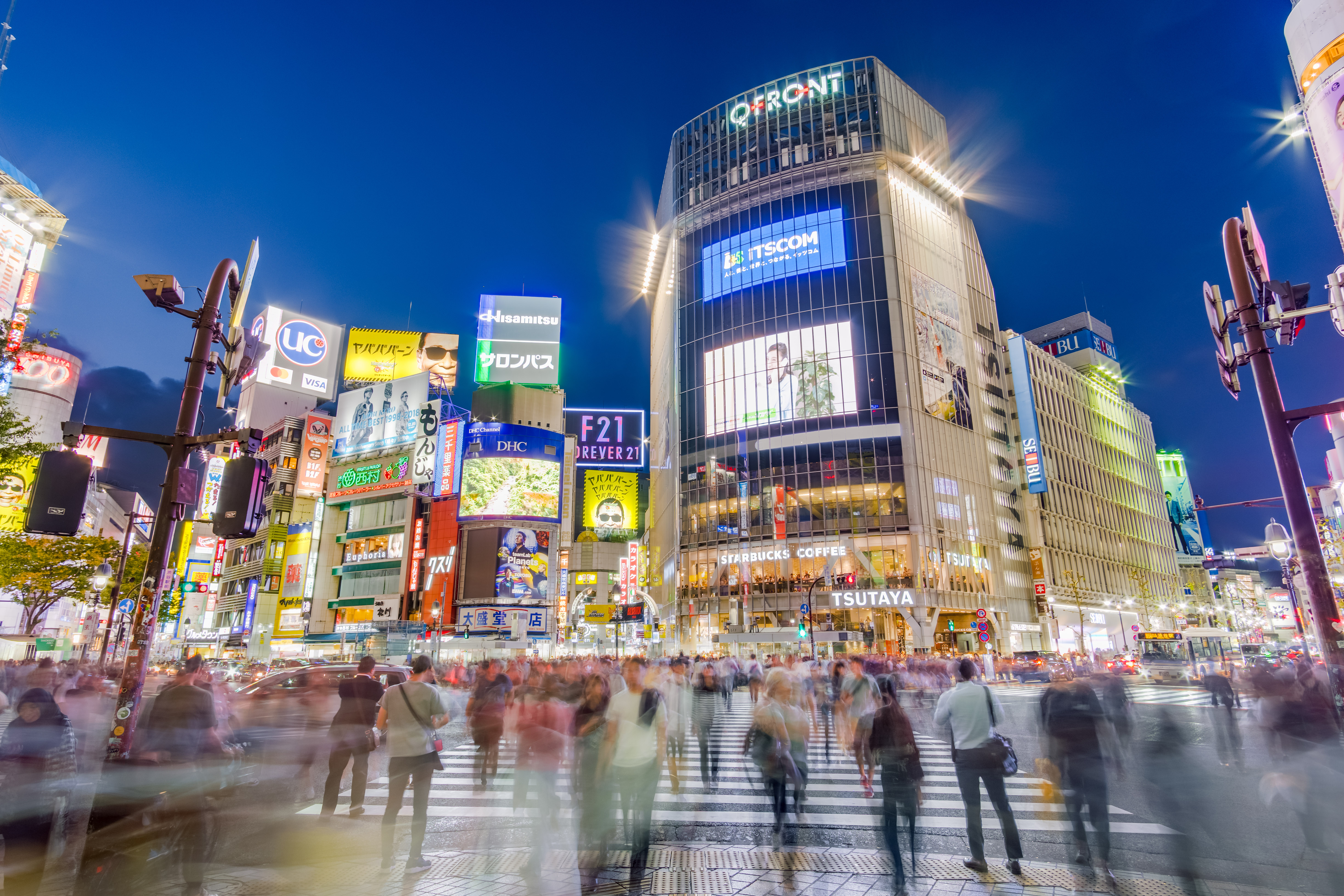
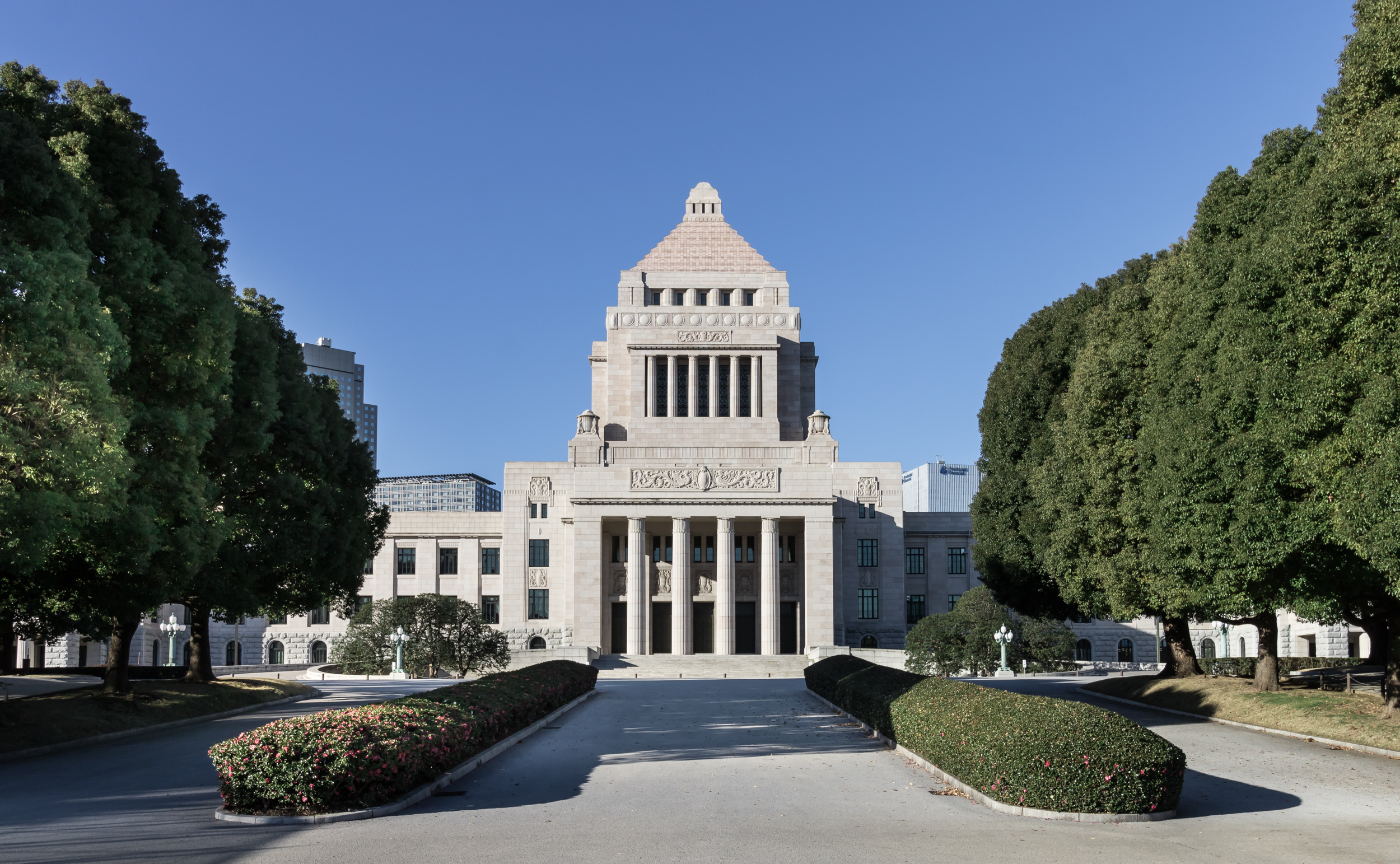
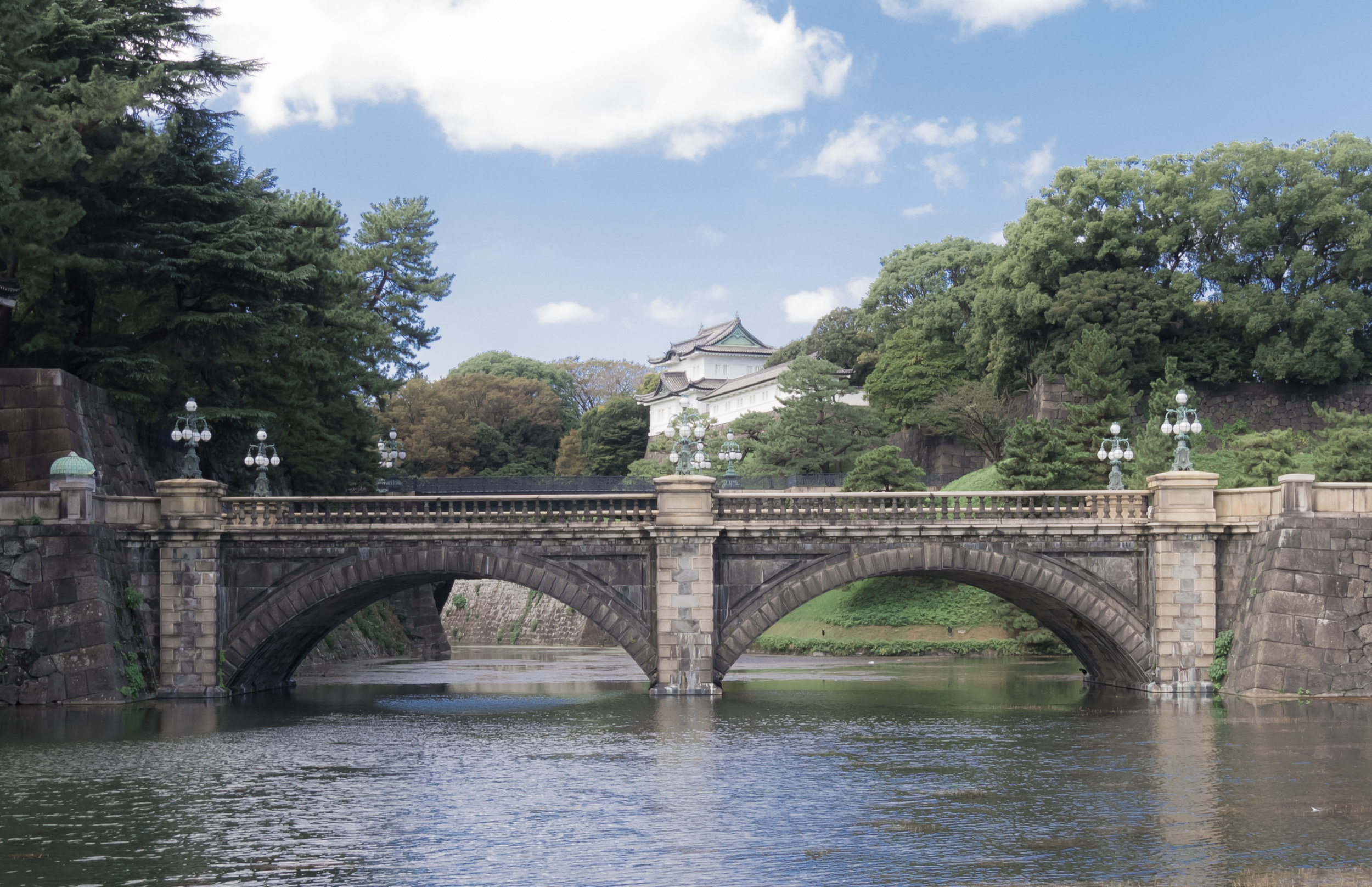
- Nishi-Shinjuku and Mount Fuji Tokyo Skytree Rainbow Bridge Tokyo Tower Shibuya Crossing National Diet Building Imperial Palace Tokyo Station

- Flag Symbol Emblem
- Nicknames: The Big Mikan
- Anthem: "Tokyo Metropolitan Song" (東京都歌, Tōkyō-to Ka)
- Interactive map outlining Tokyo
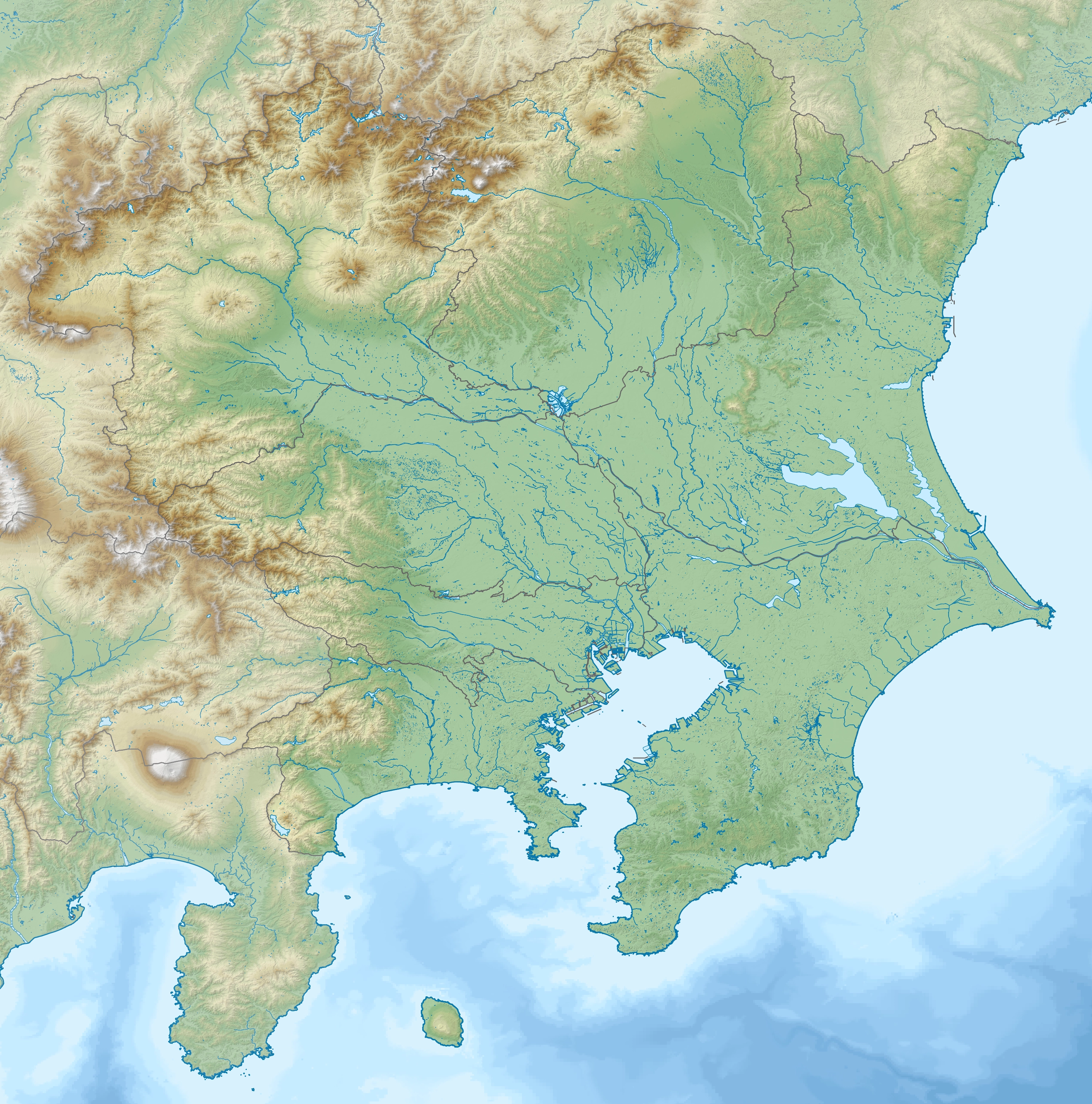
- Location within Kanto Area Location within Japan
- Coordinates: 35°41′23″N 139°41′32″E
- Country: Japan
- Region: Kantō
- Island: Honshu
- Established: 1457
- Capital: Tokyo (de facto; de jure: Shinjuku)
- Divisions: 23 special wards, 26 cities, 1 district, and 4 subprefectures

Government
  - Body: Tokyo Metropolitan Government
  - Governor: Yuriko Koike (indp.)
  - Representatives: 42
  - Councilors: 11

Area
  - Total: 2,194 km^{2} (847 sq mi)
  - Metro: 13,452 km^{2} (5,194 sq mi)
  - Rank: 45th in Japan
- Highest elevation: 2,017 m (6,617 ft)
- Lowest elevation: 0 m (0 ft)

Population (May 2025)
  - Total: 14,254,039
  - Rank: 1st in Japan; 9th in Asia
  - Density: 6,363/km^{2} (16,480/sq mi)
  - Urban: 39,105,000
  - Metro: 41,000,000
  - Metro density: 3,000/km^{2} (7,900/sq mi)
  - Dialects: Tokyo; Tama; Northern Izu Islands
- Demonym: Tokyoite

GDP (nominal, 2022)
  - Total: ¥120.22 trillion (2022) (US$914.23 billion)
  - Metro: ¥239.12 trillion (2022) (US$1.82 trillion)
- Time zone: UTC+09:00 (Japan Standard Time)
- ISO 3166-2: JP-13
- Climate: Humid subtropical climate (Cfa)
- Flower: Yoshino cherry
- Tree: Ginkgo
- Bird: Black-headed gull
- Website: metro.tokyo.lg.jp

Tokyo, (Note: /ˈtoʊkioʊ/; Japanese: 東京, Tōkyō, [tò̞ó̞.k̟ʲj̊ó̞ó̞, tó̞ó̞-]) officially the Tokyo Metropolis, (Note: 東京都, Tōkyō-to; Japanese pronunciation: [tò̞ó̞.k̟ʲj̊ó̞ò̞.tò̞, tó̞ó̞-]) is the capital and most populous city of Japan. The population of the city proper was over 14 million as of 2023. The Greater Tokyo Area, which includes Tokyo and parts of six neighboring prefectures, is the third-most populous metropolitan area in the world, with 33 million residents as of 2025.

Lying at the head of Tokyo Bay, Tokyo is part of the Kantō region, on the central coast of Honshu, Japan's largest island. It is Japan's economic center and the seat of the Japanese government and the Emperor of Japan. The Tokyo Metropolitan Government administers Tokyo's central 23 special wards, which formerly made up Tokyo City; various commuter towns and suburbs in its western area; and two outlying island chains, the Tokyo Islands. Although most of the world recognizes Tokyo as a city, since 1943 its governing structure has been more akin to that of a prefecture, with an accompanying Governor and Assembly taking precedence over the smaller municipal governments that make up the metropolis. Special wards in Tokyo include Chiyoda, the site of the National Diet Building and the Tokyo Imperial Palace; Shinjuku, the city's administrative center; and Shibuya, a hub of commerce and business.

Tokyo, originally known as Edo, rose to political prominence in 1603 when it became the seat of the Tokugawa shogunate, and by the mid-18th century, Edo had evolved from a small fishing village into one of the largest cities in the world, with a population surpassing one million. After the Meiji Restoration (1868), the imperial capital in Kyoto was moved to Edo, and the city was renamed Tokyo (lit. 'Eastern Capital'). Tokyo was greatly damaged by the 1923 Great Kantō earthquake and by Allied bombing raids during World War II. Beginning in the late 1940s, Tokyo underwent rapid reconstruction and expansion, which fueled the Japanese economic miracle, in which Japan's economy became the second-largest in the world at the time, behind that of the United States. As of 2025, Tokyo is home to 26 of the world's 500 largest companies, as listed in the annual Fortune Global 500.

Tokyo was the first city in Asia to host the Summer Olympics and Paralympics, in 1964, and also hosted in 2021. It hosted three G7 summits in 1979, 1986, and 1993. Tokyo is an international hub of research and development and an academic center, with several major universities, including the University of Tokyo, the top-ranking university in Japan. Tokyo Station is the central hub for the Shinkansen, the country's high-speed railway network, and the city's Shinjuku Station is the world's busiest train station. Tokyo Skytree is the world's tallest tower. The Tokyo Metro Ginza Line, which opened in 1927, is the oldest underground metro line in Asia.

Tokyo's nominal gross domestic output was 120.2 trillion yen (US$887.9 billion) in FY2022 and accounted for 21.2% of Japan's economic output, which converts to 8.43 million yen or US$62,291 per capita. Including the Greater Tokyo Area, Tokyo is the second-largest metropolitan economy in the world after New York, with a 2022 gross metropolitan product estimated at US$2.08 trillion. Although Tokyo's status as a leading global financial hub has diminished with the Lost Decades since the 1990s, when the Tokyo Stock Exchange (TSE) was the world's largest, with a market capitalization about 1.5 times that of the NYSE, Tokyo is still a leading financial hub, and the TSE remains among the world's top five major stock exchanges. Tokyo is categorized as an Alpha+ city by the Globalization and World Cities Research Network. It ranked 14th in the 2024 edition of the Global Livability Ranking, and has been ranked as the safest city in the world by the Economist Intelligence Unit.

== Etymology ==
Tokyo
- Tōkyō in kanji

Japanese name
- Kanji: 東京
- Hiragana: とうきょう
- Katakana: トウキョウ
Transcriptions
- Revised Hepburn: Tōkyō
- Kunrei-shiki: Tôkyô

Tokyo was originally known as Edo (江戸), a kanji compound of 江 (e, 'cove, inlet') and 戸 (to, 'entrance, gate, door'). The name, which can be translated as "estuary", is a reference to the original settlement's location at the meeting of the Sumida River and Tokyo Bay. During the Meiji Restoration in 1868, the name of the city was changed to Tokyo (東京; from 東 tō 'east', and 京 kyō 'capital'), when it became the new imperial capital, in line with the East Asian tradition of including the word for capital (京) in the name of the capital city (for example, Kyoto (京都), Keijō (京城), Beijing (北京), Nanjing (南京), and Xijing (西京)). During the early Meiji period, the city was sometimes called Tōkei, an alternative pronunciation for the same characters representing "Tokyo", making it a kanji homograph. Some surviving official English documents use the spelling "Tokei"; however, this pronunciation is now obsolete.

== History ==
=== Pre-Tokugawa period ===
The site of Tokyo has been inhabited since ancient times, and there have been multiple Paleolithic period (around 40,000–16,000 BC) sites found in present-day Tokyo. During the subsequent Jomon period, the Holocene glacial retreat caused sea levels in Tokyo Bay to rise by 120 cm, with the coastline running along the edge of what is now the Imperial Palace. Middens such as the Omori Shell Mounds still mark where the coastline ran in those days. The Yayoi period, during which agriculture spread across the country, is named after the Yayoi 2-chōme Site in Bunkyo, where the first example of Yayoi pottery was excavated in 1884 by Shozo Arisaka.

In 534, a large-scale conflict was recorded in the region, as a result of which Kasahara no Omi, the victor, was appointed Kuni no Miyatsuko (provincial governor) by Emperor Ankan. Senso-ji in Asakusa was founded in 645. Under the Ritsuryō system established during the Asuka period, most of present-day Tokyo was part of Musashi Province. Following the fall of the Kingdom of Baekje after the Battle of Baekgang in the 660s, thousands of refugees were resettled in Musashi. During the Heian period, Edo was first fortified by the Edo clan in the late twelfth century, and in 1457, Ōta Dōkan built Edo Castle to defend the region from the Chiba clan. After Dōkan was assassinated in 1486, the Ohgigayatsu branch of the Uesugi clan took control of the castle and the surrounding area. However, the Later Hōjō clan replaced them after the Battle of Takanawahara in 1524, only to be defeated by Toyotomi Hideyoshi during the Siege of Odawara in 1590.

=== 1590–1868: Tokugawa period ===
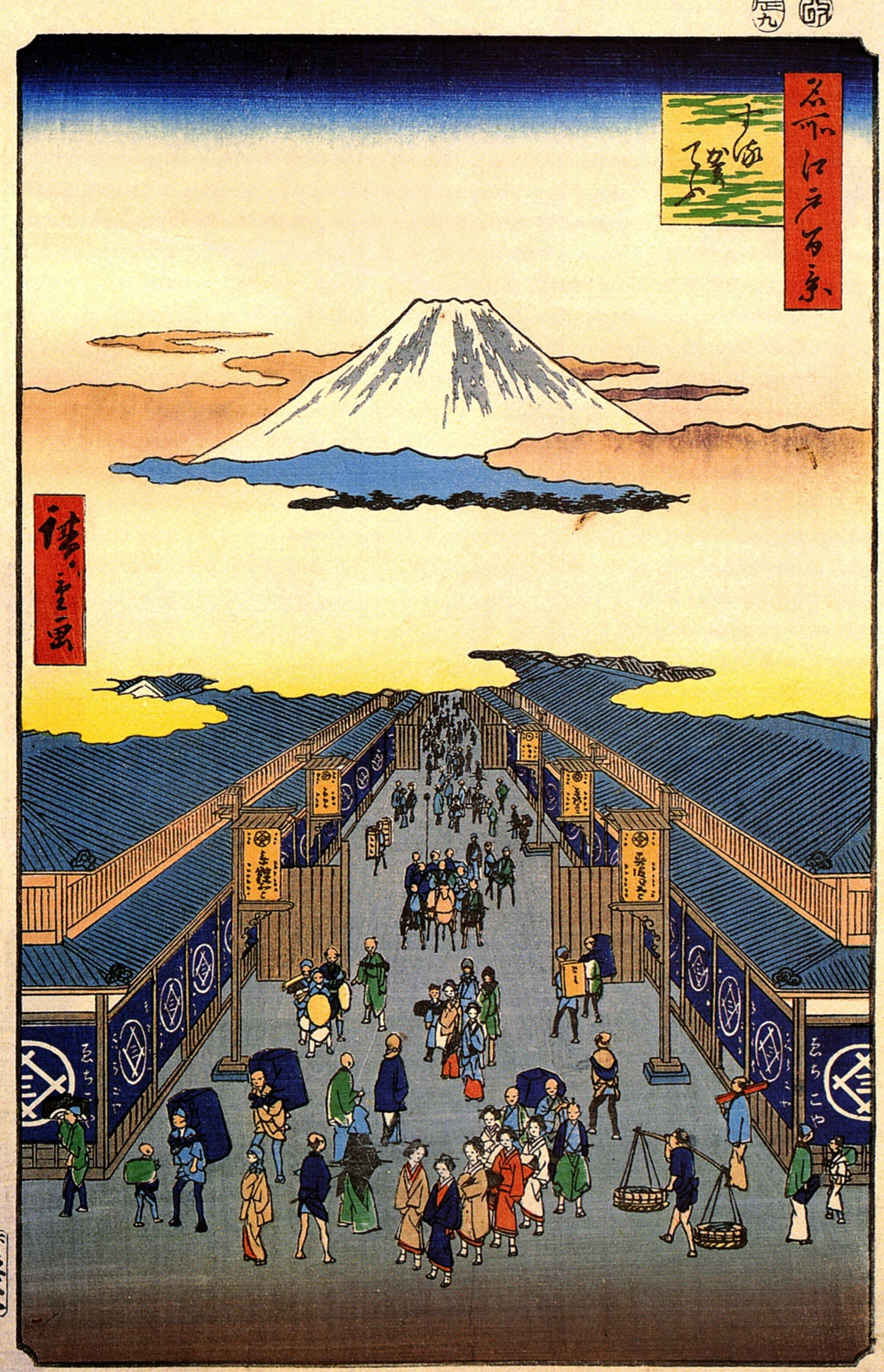
Mitsukoshi stores in Nihonbashi, by Hiroshige, c. 1836

Following the siege of Odawara, Tokugawa Ieyasu was granted the Kantō region and moved there from his ancestral land of Mikawa Province. When he became shōgun, the de facto ruler of the country, in 1603, the whole country came to be ruled by Edo. While the Tokugawa shogunate ruled the country in practice, the Imperial House of Japan based in Kyoto was still the de jure ruler, and the title of shōgun was granted by the Emperor as a formality. During the Edo period, the city enjoyed a prolonged period of peace known as the Pax Tokugawa, and in the presence of such peace, the shogunate adopted a stringent policy of seclusion, which helped to perpetuate the lack of any serious military threat to the city. The absence of war-inflicted devastation allowed Edo to devote the majority of its resources to rebuilding in the wake of consistent fires, earthquakes and other devastating natural disasters, and Edo grew into one of the largest cities in the world with a population reaching one million by the 18th century.

However, this prolonged period of seclusion ended with the arrival of American Commodore Matthew C. Perry in 1853. Commodore Perry forced the opening of the ports of Shimoda and Hakodate, leading to an increase in the demand for new foreign goods and subsequently a severe rise in inflation. Social unrest mounted in the wake of these higher prices and culminated in widespread rebellions and demonstrations, especially in the form of the "smashing" of rice establishments. Meanwhile, supporters of the Emperor leveraged the disruption caused by widespread rebellious demonstrations to further consolidate power, which resulted in the overthrow of the last Tokugawa shōgun, Yoshinobu, in 1867 and the end of the Pax Tokugawa. Despite Edo castle being handed over to the Emperor-supporting forces, some forces loyal to the shogunate kept fighting, ending with the final Battle of Ueno on July 4, 1868.

=== 1868–1941 ===
After being handed over to the Meiji government, Edo was renamed Tokyo (Eastern Capital) on September 3, 1868, and the capital was subsequently moved officially from Kyoto to Tokyo by Emperor Meiji. The former Edo Castle became the new Imperial Palace, and Government ministries such as the Ministry of Finance were relocated to Tokyo by 1871. The 1870s also saw the establishment of other major institutions and facilities such as Ueno Park (1873), the University of Tokyo (1877) and the Tokyo Stock Exchange (1878), as well as the rise of public transportion such as the first railway line in the country, connecting Shimbashi (Shiodome) and Yokohama (Sakuragicho). The rapid modernization of the country was driven from Tokyo, with its business districts such as Marunouchi filled with modern brick buildings and the railway network serving as a means to help the large influx of labour force needed to keep the development of the economy. The City of Tokyo was officially established on May 1, 1889. The Imperial Diet, the national legislature of the country, was established in Tokyo in 1889, and it has ever since been operating in the city.

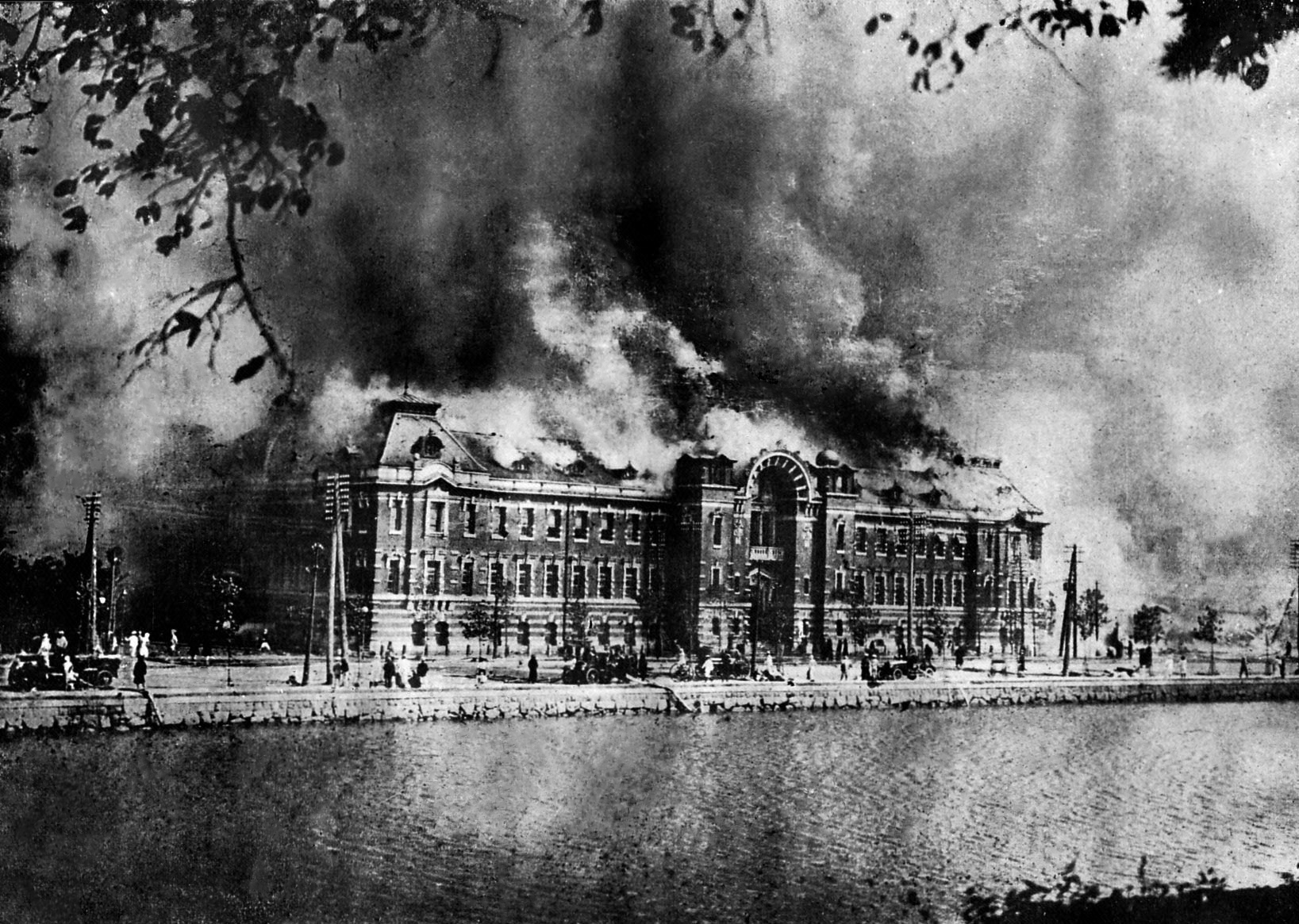
The Metropolitan Police headquarters ablaze following the earthquake. The fire triggered by the earthquake caused fire whirls.

On September 1, 1923, the Great Kanto Earthquake struck the city, and the earthquake and subsequent fire killed an estimated 105,000 citizens. The loss amounted to 37 percent of the country's economic output. On the other hand, the destruction provided an opportunity to reconsider the planning of the city, which had changed its shape hastily after the Meiji Restoration. The high survival rate of concrete buildings promoted the transition from timber and brick architecture to modern, earthquake-proof construction. The Tokyo Metro Ginza Line portion between Ueno and Asakusa, the first underground railway line built outside Europe and the American continents, was completed on December 30, 1927. Although Tokyo recovered robustly from the earthquake and new cultural and liberal political movements, such as Taishō Democracy, spread, the 1930s saw an economic downturn caused by the Great Depression and major political turmoil. Two attempted military coups d'état happened in Tokyo, the May 15 incident in 1932 and the February 26 incident in 1936. This turmoil eventually allowed the military wings of the government to take control of the country, leading to Japan joining the Second World War as an Axis power. Due to the country's political isolation on the international stage caused by its military aggression in China and the increasingly unstable geopolitical situations in Europe, Тоkуо had to give up hosting the 1940 Summer Olympics in 1938. Rationing started in June 1940 as the nation braced itself for another world war, while the 26th Centenary of the Enthronement of Emperor Jimmu celebrations took place on a grand scale to boost morale and increase the sense of national identity in the same year. On December 7, 1941, Japan attacked the American bases at Pearl Harbor in Hawaii, entering the Second World War against the Allied Powers. The wartime regime greatly affected life in the city.

=== 1942–1945 ===
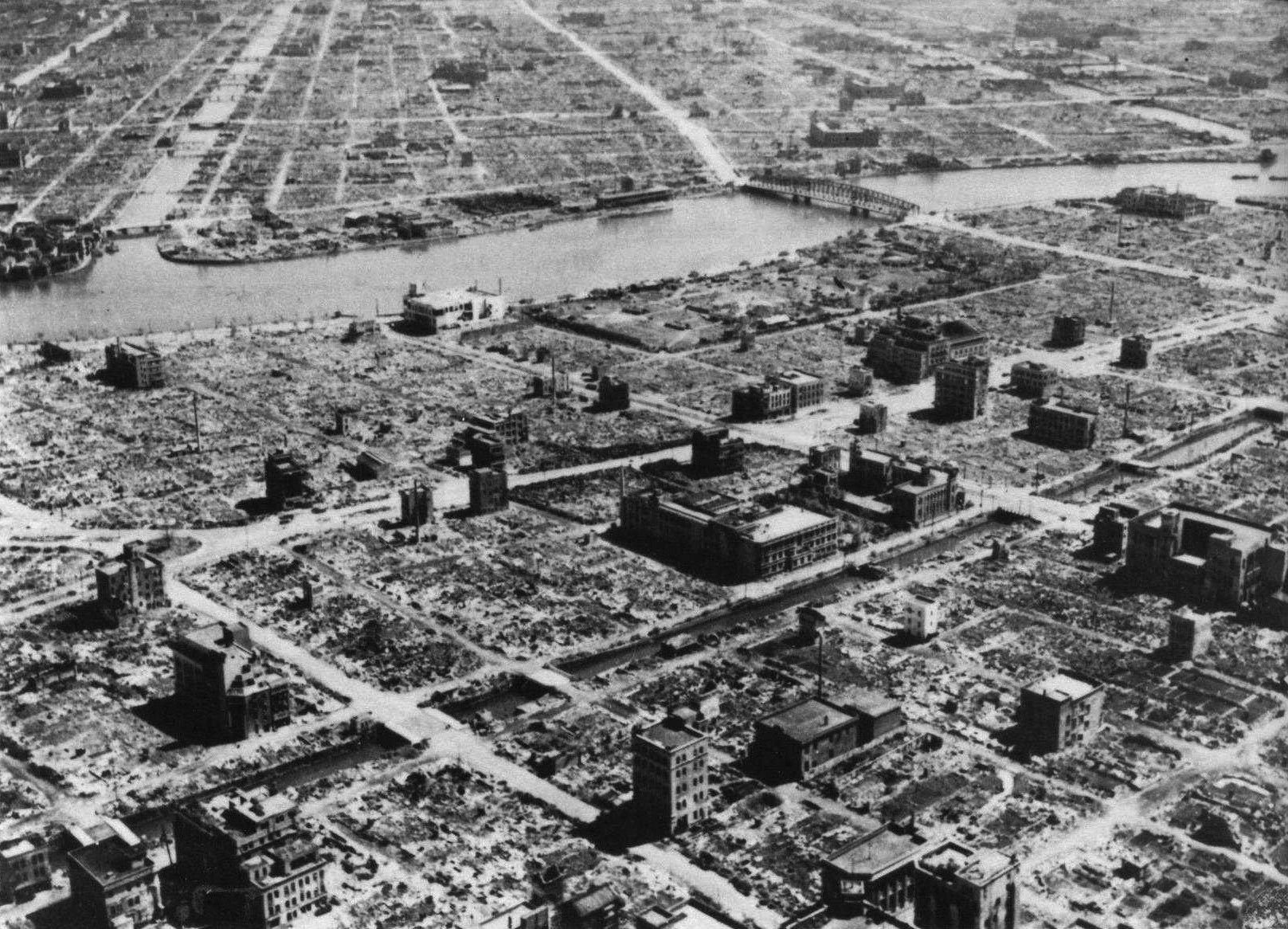
A birds-eye view over the Ningyōchō district after the air raid of March 10, 1945

In 1943, Tokyo City merged with Tokyo Prefecture to form the Tokyo Metropolis (東京都, Tōkyō-to), a reorganization aimed to create a more centralized and efficient administrative structure to better manage resources, urban planning, and civil defence during wartime. The Tokyo Metropolitan Government thus became responsible for both prefectural and city functions while administering cities, towns, and villages in the suburban and rural areas. Although Japan enjoyed significant success in the initial stages of the war and rapid expansion of its sphere of influence, the Doolittle Raid on April 18, 1942, marked the first direct foreign attack on Tokyo. Although the physical damage was minimal, the raid demonstrated the vulnerability of the Japanese mainland to air attacks and boosted American morale.

Large-scale Allied air bombing of cities in the Japanese home islands, including Tokyo, began in late 1944 when the US seized control of the Mariana Islands. From these islands, newly developed long-range B-29 bombers could conduct return journeys. The bombing of Tokyo in 1944 and 1945 is estimated to have killed between 75,000 and 200,000 civilians and left more than half of the city destroyed. The deadliest night of the war came on March 9–10, 1945, the night of the American "Operation Meetinghouse" raid. Nearly 700,000 incendiary bombs were dropped on the east end of the city (Shitamachi, 下町), an area with a high concentration of factories and working-class houses. Two-fifths of the city were completely burned, more than 276,000 buildings were destroyed, 100,000 civilians were killed, and 110,000 more were injured. Numerous Edo and Meiji-era buildings of historical significance were destroyed, including the main building of the Imperial Palace, Sensō-ji, Zōjō-ji, Sengaku-ji and Kabuki-za. Between 1940 and 1945, the population of Tokyo dwindled from 6,700,000 to less than 2,800,000, as soldiers were sent to the front and children were evacuated.

=== 1945–1972 ===
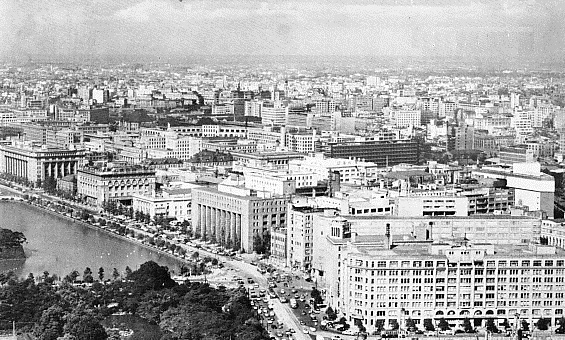
Marunouchi in the 1950s. It was not until the height restriction was lifted in the 1960s that skyscrapers began to dominate the skyline of Tokyo.

The 1964 Olympics in Tokyo symbolized the transition of the city from bombed-out ruins to a modern metropolis.

After the war, Tokyo became the base from which the Allied Occupation Forces, under Douglas MacArthur, an American general, administered Japan for six years. The original rebuilding plan of Tokyo was based on a plan modelled after the Metropolitan Green Belt of London, devised in the 1930s but canceled due to the war. However, due to the monetary contraction policy known as the Dodge Line, named after Joseph Dodge, the neoliberal economic advisor to MacArthur, the plan had to be reduced to a minimal one focusing on transport and other infrastructure. In 1947, the 35 pre-war special wards were reorganized into the current 23 wards. Tokyo did not experience fast economic growth until around 1950, when heavy industry output returned to pre-war levels.

Since around the time the Allied occupation of Japan ended in 1952, Tokyo's focus shifted from rebuilding to developing beyond its pre-war stature. From the 1950s onwards, Tokyo's Metro and railway network saw significant expansion, culminating in the launch of the world's first dedicated high-speed railway line, the Shinkansen, between Tokyo and Osaka in 1964. The same year saw the development of other transport infrastructure, such as the Shuto Expressway to meet the increased demand brought about by the 1964 Tokyo Olympics, the first Olympic Games held in Asia. Around this time, the 31-metre height restriction, imposed on all buildings since 1920, was relaxed due to the increased demand for office buildings and advancements in earthquake-proof construction. Starting with the Kasumigaseki Building (147 metres) in 1968, skyscrapers began to dominate Tokyo's skyline. During this period of rapid rebuilding, Tokyo celebrated its 500th anniversary in 1956 and the Ogasawara Islands, which had been under control of the US since the war ended, were returned in 1968. Ryokichi Minobe, a Marxian economist who served as the governor for 12 years starting in 1967, is remembered for his welfare state policy, including free healthcare for the elderly and financial support for households with children, and his 'war against pollution' policy, as well as the large government deficit they caused.

=== 1973–present ===
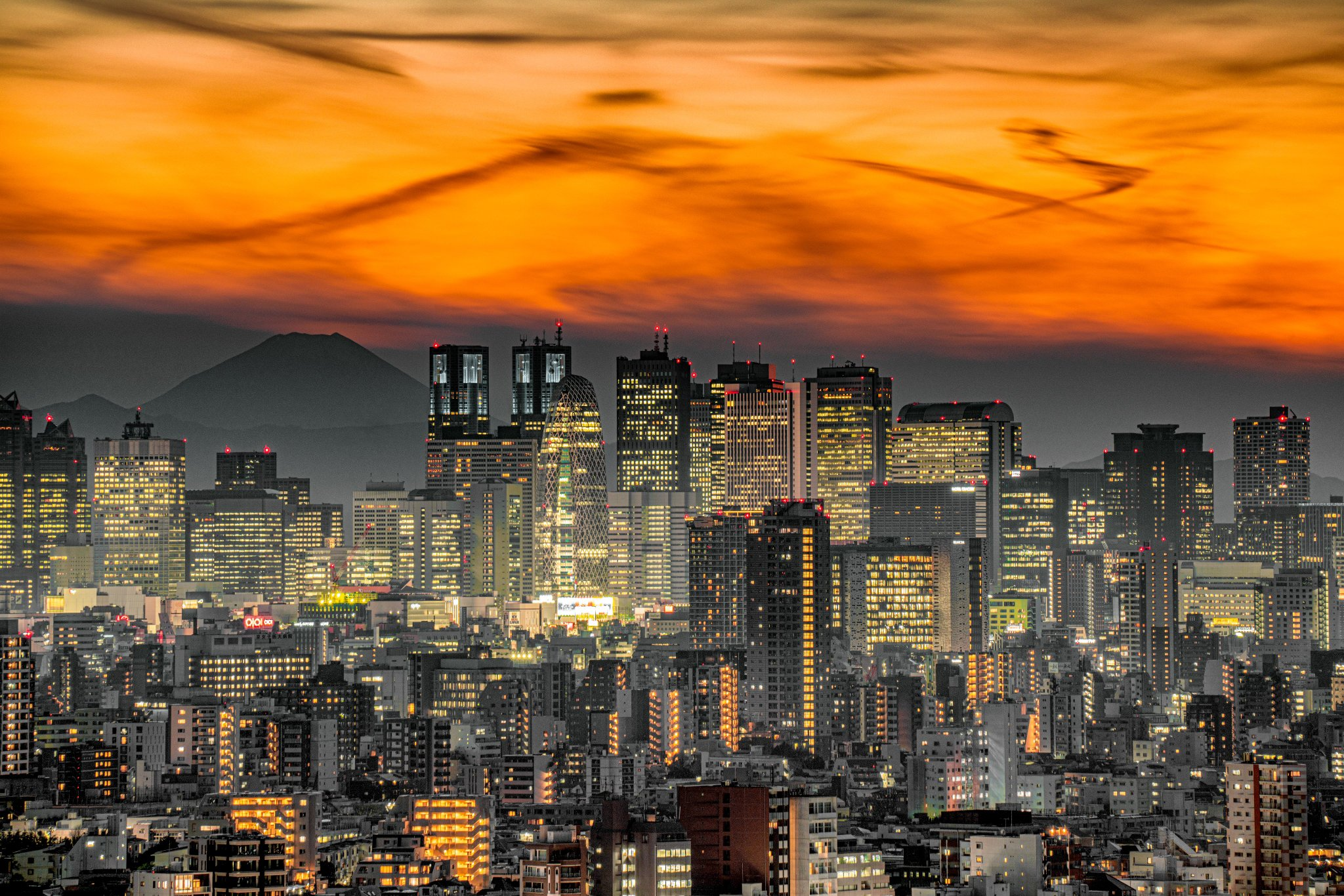
Shinjuku's development as a business district started in the 1970s.

Although the 1973 oil crisis put an end to the rapid post-war recovery and development of Japan's economy, its became the world's second-largest economy at the time during that decade, remaining so until 2010 when it was surpassed by China. Tokyo's development was sustained by its status as the economic, political, and cultural hub of such a country. In 1978, after years of the intense Sanrizuka Struggle, Narita International Airport opened as the new gateway to the city, while Haneda Airport switched to primarily domestic flights. West Shinjuku, which had been occupied by the vast Yodobashi Water Purification Centre until 1965, became the site of an entirely new business district characterized by skyscrapers surpassing 200 metres during this period.

The American-led Plaza Accord in 1985, which aimed to depreciate the US dollar, had a devastating effect on Japan's manufacturing sector, particularly affecting small to mid-size companies based in Tokyo. This led the government to adopt a domestic-demand-focused economic policy, ultimately causing an asset price bubble. Land redevelopment projects were planned across the city, and real estate prices skyrocketed. By 1990, the estimated value of the Imperial Palace surpassed that of the entire state of California. The Tokyo Stock Exchange became the largest stock exchange in the world by market capitalization, with the Tokyo-based NTT becoming the most highly valued company globally.

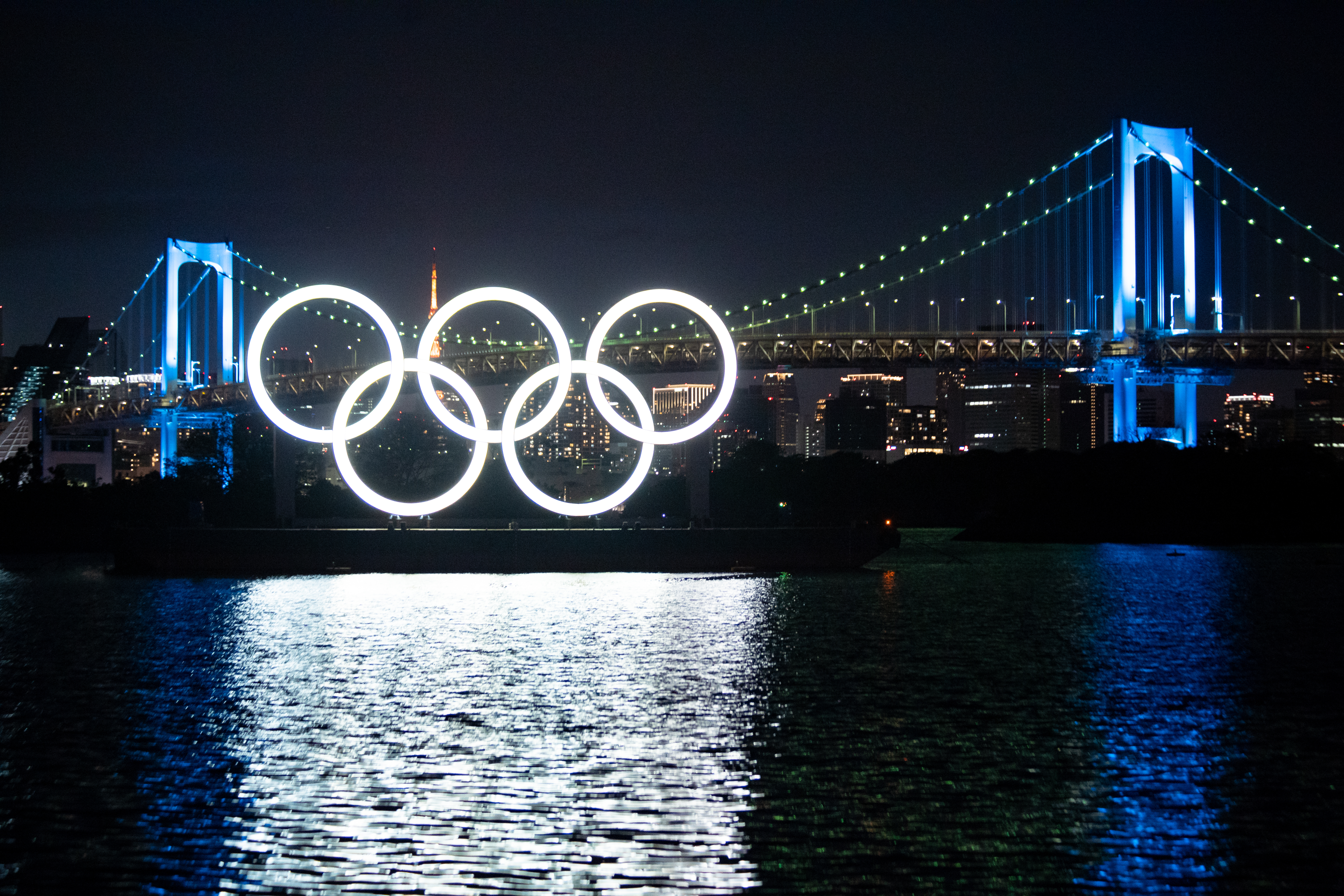
The 2020 Olympics were postponed and held in 2021 due to the COVID-19 pandemic.

After the bubble burst in the early 1990s, Japan experienced a prolonged economic downturn called the "Lost Decades", characterized by extremely low or negative economic growth, deflation, and stagnant asset prices. Tokyo's status as a world city is said to have depreciated greatly during these three decades. Nonetheless, Tokyo still saw new urban developments during this period. Recent projects include Ebisu Garden Place, Tennōzu Isle, Shiodome, Roppongi Hills, Shinagawa, and the Marunouchi side of Tokyo Station. Land reclamation projects in Tokyo have also been going on for centuries. The most prominent is the Odaiba area, now a major shopping and entertainment center. In the 1990s, various plans were proposed for transferring national government functions from Tokyo to secondary capitals in other regions of Japan, to spread population and investment more evenly. Such plans were met with fierce opposition, and then-prime minister Junichiro Koizumi decided to close parliamentary discussions in 2003. The Agency for Cultural Affairs relocated from Kasumigaseki to Kyoto in 2023, making it the only central organ of the Civil Service to move out of Tokyo so far.

On September 7, 2013, the IOC selected Tokyo to host the 2020 Summer Olympics. Thus, Tokyo became the first Asian city to host the Olympic Games twice. However, the 2020 Olympic Games were postponed and held from July 23 to August 8, 2021, as a result of the COVID-19 pandemic.

== Administration ==
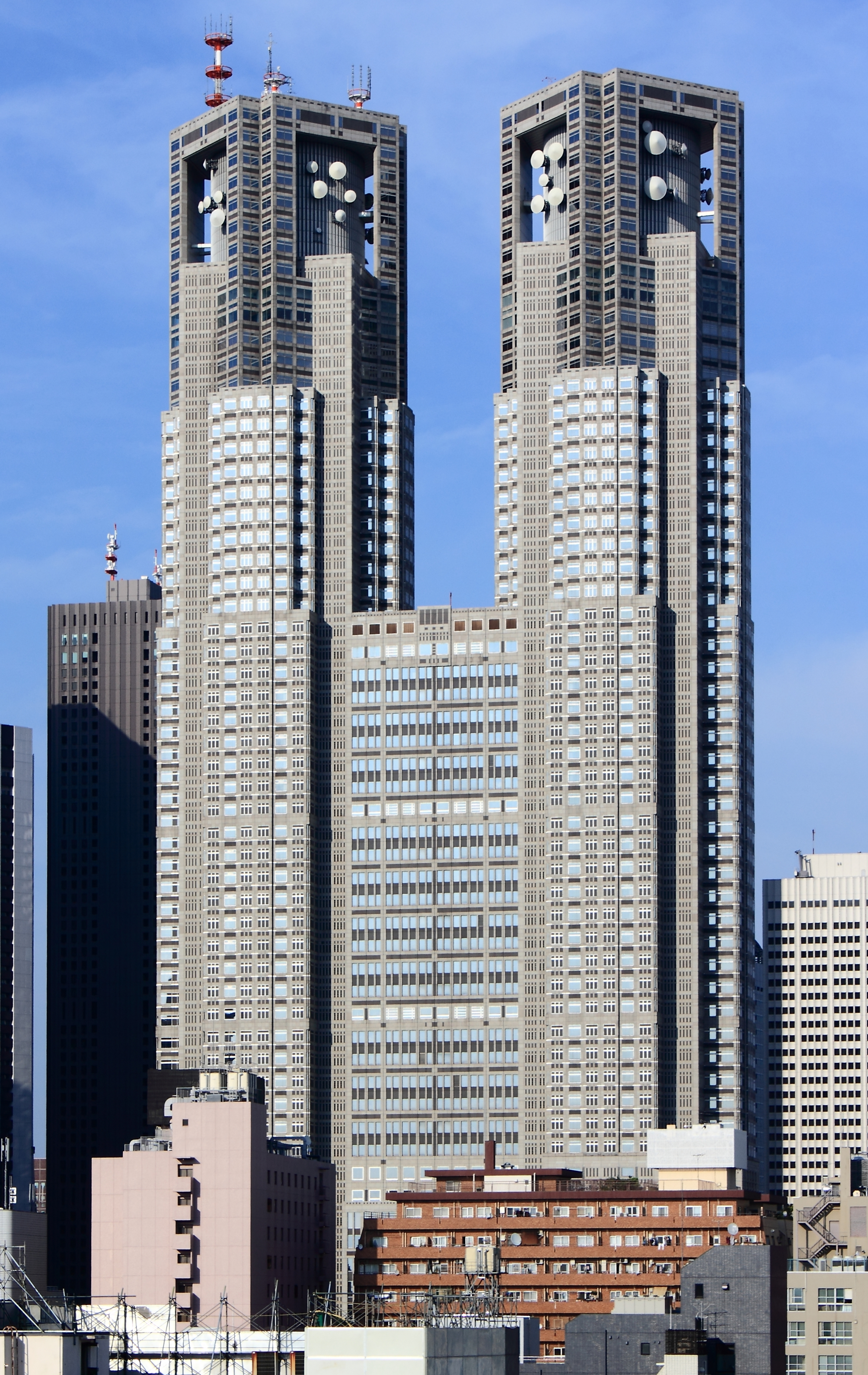
Tokyo Metropolitan Government Building, Shinjuku, designed by Kenzo Tange

=== Local government ===
Under Japanese law, the prefecture of Tokyo is designated as a to (都), translated as metropolis. Tokyo Prefecture is the most populous prefecture and the densest, with 6,100 inhabitants per square kilometer (16,000/sq mi); by geographic area it is the third-smallest, above only Osaka and Kagawa. Its administrative structure is similar to that of Japan's other prefectures. The 23 special wards (特別区, tokubetsu-ku), which until 1943 constituted the city of Tokyo, are self-governing municipalities, each having a mayor, a council, and the status of a city.

In addition to these 23 special wards, Tokyo also includes 26 more cities (市 -shi), five towns (町 -chō or machi), and eight villages (村 -son or -mura), each of which has a local government. The Tokyo Metropolitan Government administers the whole metropolis, including the 23 special wards and the cities and towns that constitute the prefecture. It is headed by a publicly elected governor and metropolitan assembly. Its headquarters is in Shinjuku Ward.

The governor of Tokyo is elected every four years. The incumbent governor, Yuriko Koike, was elected in 2016, following the resignation of her predecessor, Yoichi Masuzoe. She was re-elected in 2020 and 2024. The legislature of the Metropolis is called the Metropolitan Assembly, and it has one house with 127 seats. The assembly is responsible for enacting and amending prefectural ordinances, approving the budget (8.5 trillion yen in fiscal 2024), and voting on important administrative appointments made by the governor, including the vice governors. Its members are also elected on a four-year cycle.

==== Municipalities ====
A map with Nishi-Tama District in green

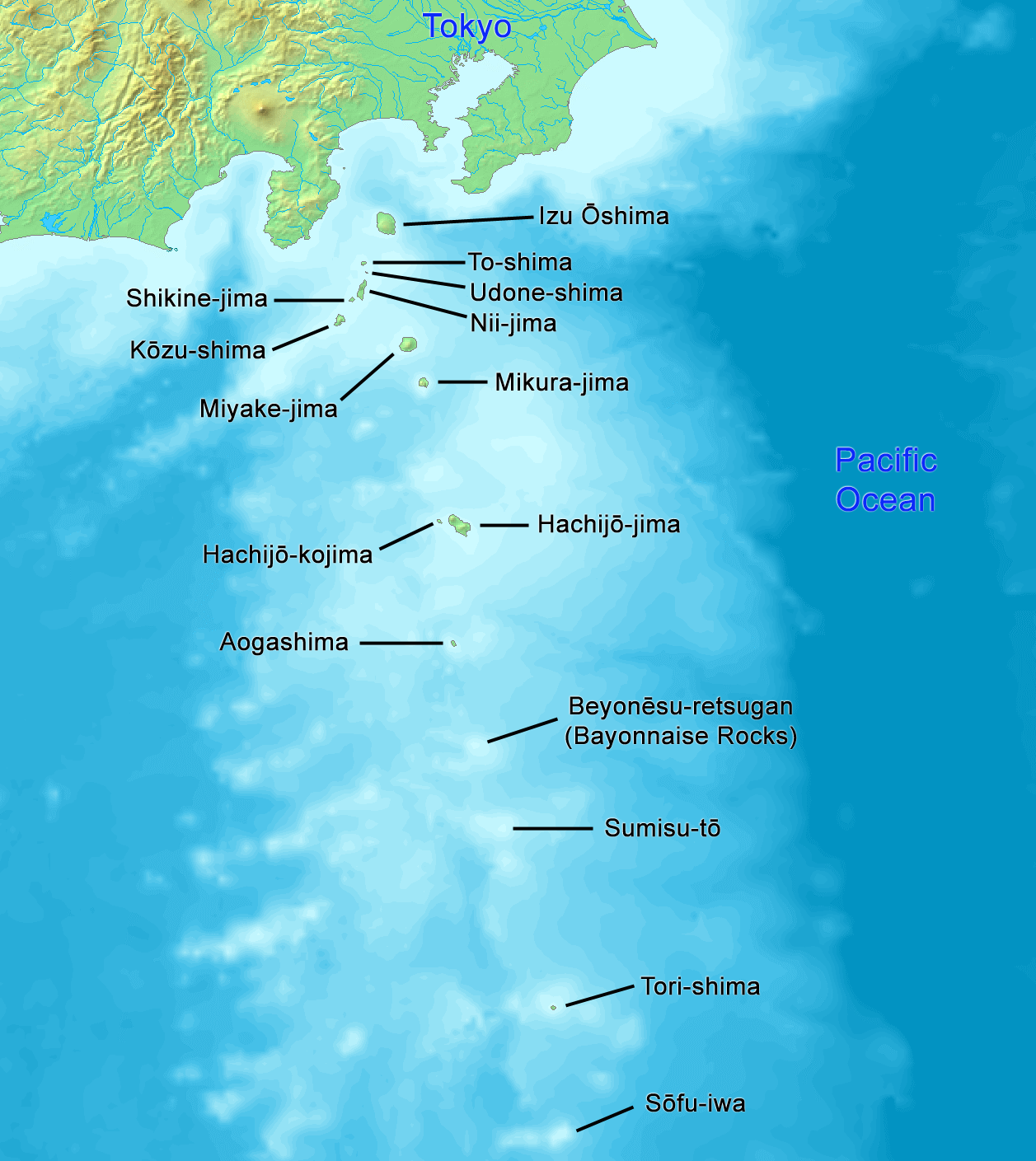
A map of the Izu Islands with black labels

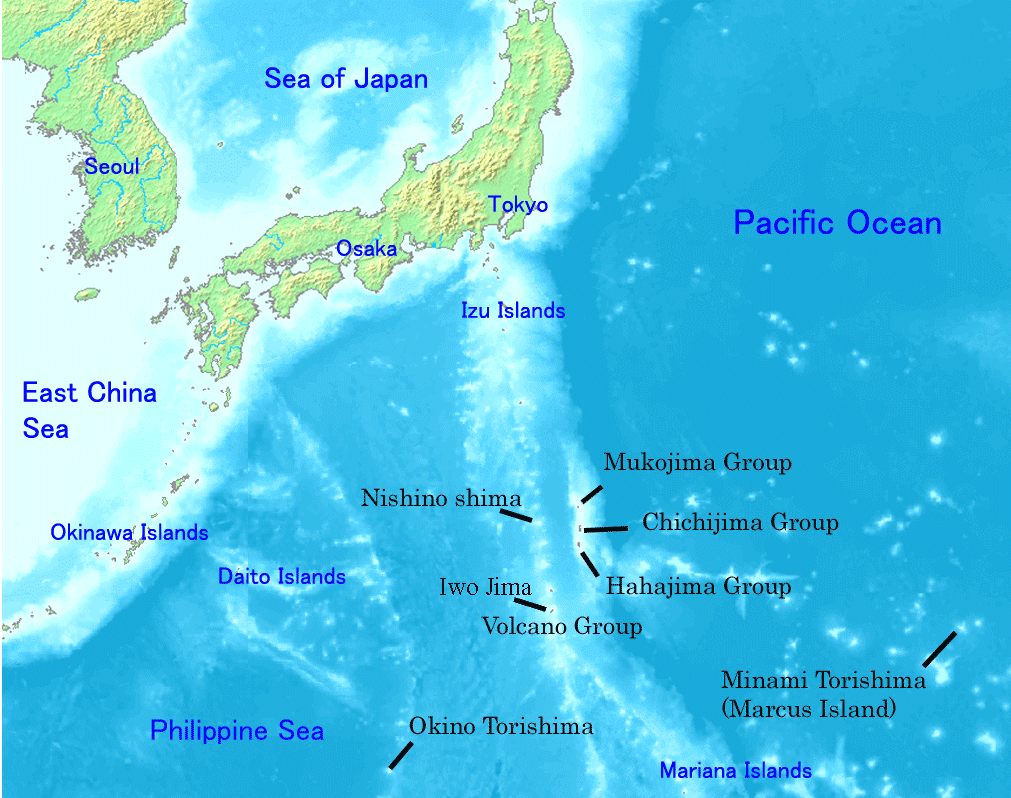
A map of the Ogasawara Islands with black labels

Since the completion of the Great Mergers of Heisei in 2001, Tokyo consists of 62 municipalities: 23 special wards, 26 cities, 5 towns and 8 villages. All municipalities in Japan have a directly elected mayor and a directly elected assembly, each elected on independent four-year cycles. The 23 Special Wards cover the area that had been Tokyo City until 1943, 30 other municipalities are located in the Tama area, and the remaining 9 are on Tokyo's outlying islands.

- The special wards (特別区, tokubetsu-ku) of Tokyo comprise the area formerly incorporated as Tokyo City. Each special ward has used the word "city" in its official English name in recent times (e.g., Chiyoda City), but its status is more akin to boroughs in London or New York. Certain municipal functions, such as waterworks, sewerage, and fire-fighting, are handled by the Tokyo Metropolitan Government rather than each ward. To pay for the added administrative costs, the Metropolitan Government collects municipal taxes, which would usually be levied by each ward. The "three central wards" of Tokyo – Chiyoda, Chūō, and Minato – are the business core of the city, with a daytime population more than seven times higher than their nighttime population. Chiyoda Ward is occupied by many major Japanese companies and is also the seat of the national government, and the Emperor of Japan, yet is one of the least populated wards.
- To the west of the special wards, Tokyo Metropolis consists of cities, towns, and villages that enjoy the same legal status as those elsewhere in Japan. While serving as "bed towns" for those working in central Tokyo, some of them also have a local commercial and industrial base, such as Tachikawa. Collectively, these are often known as the Tama area or Western Tokyo. The far west of the Tama area is occupied by the district (gun) of Nishi-Tama. Much of this area is mountainous and unsuitable for urbanization. The highest mountain in Tokyo, Mount Kumotori, is 2,017 m (6,617 ft) high; other mountains in Tokyo include Takanosu (1,737 m (5,699 ft)), Odake (1,266 m (4,154 ft)), and Mitake (929 m (3,048 ft)). Lake Okutama, on the Tama River near Yamanashi Prefecture, is Tokyo's largest lake and serves as the primary reservoir for Tokyo's water supply. The district is composed of three towns (Hinode, Mizuho and Okutama) and one village (Hinohara). The Tokyo Metropolitan Government has designated Hachiōji, Tachikawa, Machida, Ōme, and Tama New Town as regional centers of the Tama area.

Tokyo has numerous outlying islands, which extend as far as 1,850 km (1,150 mi) from central Tokyo. Because of the islands' distance from the administrative headquarters of the Tokyo Metropolitan Government in Shinjuku, local sub-prefectural branch offices administer them. The Izu Islands are a group of volcanic islands and form part of the Fuji-Hakone-Izu National Park. The islands in order from closest to Tokyo are Izu Ōshima, Toshima, Nii-jima, Shikine-jima, Kōzu-shima, Miyake-jima, Mikurajima, Hachijō-jima, and Aogashima. The Izu Islands are grouped into three subprefectures. Izu Ōshima and Hachijojima are towns. The remaining islands are six villages, with Niijima and Shikinejima forming one village. The Ogasawara Islands include, from north to south, Chichi-jima, Nishinoshima, Haha-jima, Kita Iwo Jima, Iwo Jima, and Minami Iwo Jima. Ogasawara also administers two small outlying islands: Minami Torishima, the easternmost point in Japan and at 1,850 km (1,150 mi) the most distant island from central Tokyo, and Okinotorishima, the southernmost point in Japan. Japan's claim on an exclusive economic zone (EEZ) surrounding Okinotorishima is contested by China and South Korea as they regard Okinotorishima as uninhabitable rocks which have no EEZ. The Iwo chain and the outlying islands have no permanent population, but hosts Japan Self-Defense Forces personnel. Local populations are only found in Chichi-Jima and Haha-Jima. The islands form both Ogasawara Subprefecture and the village of Ogasawara, Tokyo.

Municipalities in Tokyo
Flag, name w/o suffix	Full name			District or Subprefecture	Population	LPE code (w/o checksum)
Flag, name w/o suffix	Japanese	Transcription	Translation	District or Subprefecture	Population	LPE code (w/o checksum)
Adachi	足立区	Adachi-ku	Adachi Ward	—N/a	674,067	13121
Arakawa	荒川区	Arakawa-ku	Arakawa Ward	—N/a	213,648	13118
Bunkyō	文京区	Bunkyō-ku	Bunkyō Ward	—N/a	223,389	13105
Chiyoda	千代田区	Chiyoda-ku	Chiyoda Ward	—N/a	59,441	13101
Chūō	中央区	Chūō-ku	Chūō Ward (Central Ward)	—N/a	147,620	13102
Edogawa	江戸川区	Edogawa-ku	Edogawa Ward (Edo River Ward)	—N/a	685,899	13123
Itabashi	板橋区	Itabashi-ku	Itabashi Ward	—N/a	569,225	13119
Katsushika	葛飾区	Katsushika-ku	Katsushika Ward (after Katsushika District)	—N/a	447,140	13122
Kita	北区	Kita-ku	Kita Ward (North Ward)	—N/a	345,063	13117
Kōtō	江東区	Kōtō-ku	Kōtō Ward	—N/a	502,579	13108
Meguro	目黒区	Meguro-ku	Meguro Ward	—N/a	280,283	13110
Minato	港区	Minato-ku	Minato Ward (Harbor/Port District)	—N/a	248,071	13103
Nakano	中野区	Nakano-ku	Nakano Ward	—N/a	332,902	13114
Nerima	練馬区	Nerima-ku	Nerima Ward	—N/a	726,748	13120
Ōta	大田区	Ōta-ku	Ōta Ward	—N/a	722,608	13111
Setagaya	世田谷区	Setagaya-ku	Setagaya Ward	—N/a	910,868	13112
Shibuya	渋谷区	Shibuya-ku	Shibuya Ward	—N/a	227,850	13113
Shinagawa	品川区	Shinagawa-ku	Shinagawa Ward	—N/a	392,492	13109
Shinjuku	新宿区	Shinjuku-ku	Shinjuku Ward	—N/a	339,211	13104
Suginami	杉並区	Suginami-ku	Suginami Ward	—N/a	570,483	13115
Sumida	墨田区	Sumida-ku	Sumida Ward	—N/a	260,358	13107
Taitō	台東区	Taitō-ku	Taitō Ward	—N/a	200,486	13106
Toshima	豊島区	Toshima-ku	Toshima Ward (after Toshima District)	—N/a	294,673	13116
Akiruno	あきる野市	Akiruno-shi	Akiruno City	—N/a	80,464	13228
Akishima	昭島市	Akishima-shi	Akishima City	—N/a	111,449	13207
Chōfu	調布市	Chōfu-shi	Chōfu City	—N/a	240,668	13208
Fuchū	府中市	Fuchū-shi	Fuchū City (provincial capital city)	—N/a	260,891	13206
Fussa	福生市	Fussa-shi	Fussa City	—N/a	58,393	13218
Hachiōji	八王子市	Hachiōji-shi	Hachiōji City	—N/a	579,330	13201
Hamura	羽村市	Hamura-shi	Hamura City	—N/a	55,596	13227
Higashikurume	東久留米市	Higashi-Kurume-shi	Higashi-Kurume City; East Kurume City (as opposed to Kurume City, Western Japan)	—N/a	116,869	13222
Higashimurayama	東村山市	Higashi-Murayama-shi	Higashi-Murayama City; East Murayama City (after Murayama Region)	—N/a	150,984	13213
Higashiyamato	東大和市	Higashi-Yamato-shi	Higashi-Yamato City (here: Tokyo's Yamato City) (as opposed to Kanagawa's Yamato City)	—N/a	85,229	13220
Hino	日野市	Hino-shi	Hino City	—N/a	185,133	13212
Inagi	稲城市	Inagi-shi	Inagi City	—N/a	87,927	13225
Kiyose	清瀬市	Kiyose-shi	Kiyose City	—N/a	74,495	13221
Kodaira	小平市	Kodaira-shi	Kodaira City	—N/a	194,757	13211
Koganei	小金井市	Koganei-shi	Koganei City	—N/a	121,516	13210
Kokubunji	国分寺市	Kokubunji-shi	Kokubunji City (provincial temple city)	—N/a	122,787	13214
Komae	狛江市	Komae-shi	Komae City	—N/a	81,671	13219
Kunitachi	国立市	Kunitachi-shi	Kunitachi City	—N/a	75,867	13215
Machida	町田市	Machida-shi	Machida City	—N/a	429,040	13209
Mitaka	三鷹市	Mitaka-shi	Mitaka City	—N/a	189,168	13204
Musashimurayama	武蔵村山市	Musashi-Murayama-shi	Musashi-Murayama City (as opposed to Murayama City, Dewa Province)	—N/a	70,649	13223
Musashino	武蔵野市	Musashino-shi	Musashino City (after Musashino Region)	—N/a	143,686	13203
Nishitokyo	西東京市	Nishi-Tōkyō-shi	Nishi-Tokyo City (Western Tokyo City)	—N/a	200,102	13229
Ōme	青梅市	Ōme-shi	Ōme City	—N/a	136,071	13205
Tachikawa	立川市	Tachikawa-shi	Tachikawa City	—N/a	184,183	13202
Tama	多摩市	Tama-shi	Tama City (after Tama district/area/river)	—N/a	147,953	13224
Hinode	日の出町	Hinode-machi	Hinode Town	Nishi-Tama (Western Tama)	17,141	13305
Hinohara	檜原村	Hinohara-mura	Hinohara Village	Nishi-Tama (Western Tama)	2,194	13307
Mizuho	瑞穂町	Mizuho-machi	Mizuho Town	Nishi-Tama (Western Tama)	33,117	13303
Okutama	奥多摩町	Okutama-machi	Okutama Town (Rear/Outer Tama Town)	Nishi-Tama (Western Tama)	5,177	13308
Hachijō	八丈町	Hachijō-machi	Hachijō Town (on Hachijō Island)	Hachijō	7,516	13401
Aogashima	青ヶ島村	Aogashima-mura	Aogashima Village (on Aogashima)	Hachijō	169	13402
Miyake	三宅村	Miyake-mura	Miyake Village (on Miyake Island)	Miyake	2,451	13381
Mikurajima	御蔵島村	Mikurajima-mura	Mikurajima Village (Mikura Island Village)	Miyake	328	13382
Ōshima	大島町	Ōshima-machi	Ōshima Town ([Izu] Grand Island Town)	Ōshima	7,762	13361
To-shima	利島村	Toshima-mura	To-shima Village (on homonymous island)	Ōshima	309	13362
Niijima	新島村	Niijima-mura	Niijima Village (on homonymous island)	Ōshima	2,697	13363
Kōzushima	神津島村	Kōzushima-mura	Kōzushima Village (on homonymous island)	Ōshima	1,856	13364
Ogasawara	小笠原村	Ogasawara-mura	Ogasawara Village (on homonymous islands)	Ogasawara	3,029	13421
Tokyo	東京都	Tōkyō-to	Tokyo Metropolis functionally: ~ Prefecture literally/etymologically: ~ Capital	–	13,960,236	13000 ISO: JP-13

==== Environmental policies ====
Tokyo has enacted a measure to cut greenhouse gases. Governor Shintaro Ishihara created Japan's first emissions cap system, aiming to reduce greenhouse gas emission by a total of 25% by 2020 from the 2000 level. Tokyo is an example of an urban heat island, and the phenomenon is especially serious in its special wards. According to the Tokyo Metropolitan Government, the annual mean temperature has increased by about 3 °C (5.4 °F) over the past 100 years. Tokyo has been cited as a "convincing example of the relationship between urban growth and climate".

In 2006, Tokyo enacted the "10-Year Project for Green Tokyo" to be realized by 2016. It set a goal of increasing roadside trees in Tokyo to 1 million (from 480,000), and adding 1,000 ha (2,500 acres) of green space, 88 ha (220 acres) of which would be a new park named "Umi no Mori" to replace a landfill. From 2007 to 2010, 436 ha (1,080 acres) of the planned 1,000 ha of green space was created and 220,000 trees were planted, bringing the total to 700,000. As of 2014, roadside trees in Tokyo have increased to 950,000, and a further 300 ha (740 acres) of green space have been added.

In 2023, the Tokyo Metropolitan Government launched the Tokyo Green Biz Project, an initiative seeking to increase and preserve the city's greenery over the next 100 years, create an online map designed to increase collaboration between residents and the local government, and create and promote green infrastructure. They have also increased the footage of parks, and encourage citizens to get involved in pond cleaning, tree planting, and working as park guides.

In 2018 the Kasai Marine Park became the first wetland in Tokyo to be registered under the Ramsar Convention. It opened in 1989.

=== National government ===
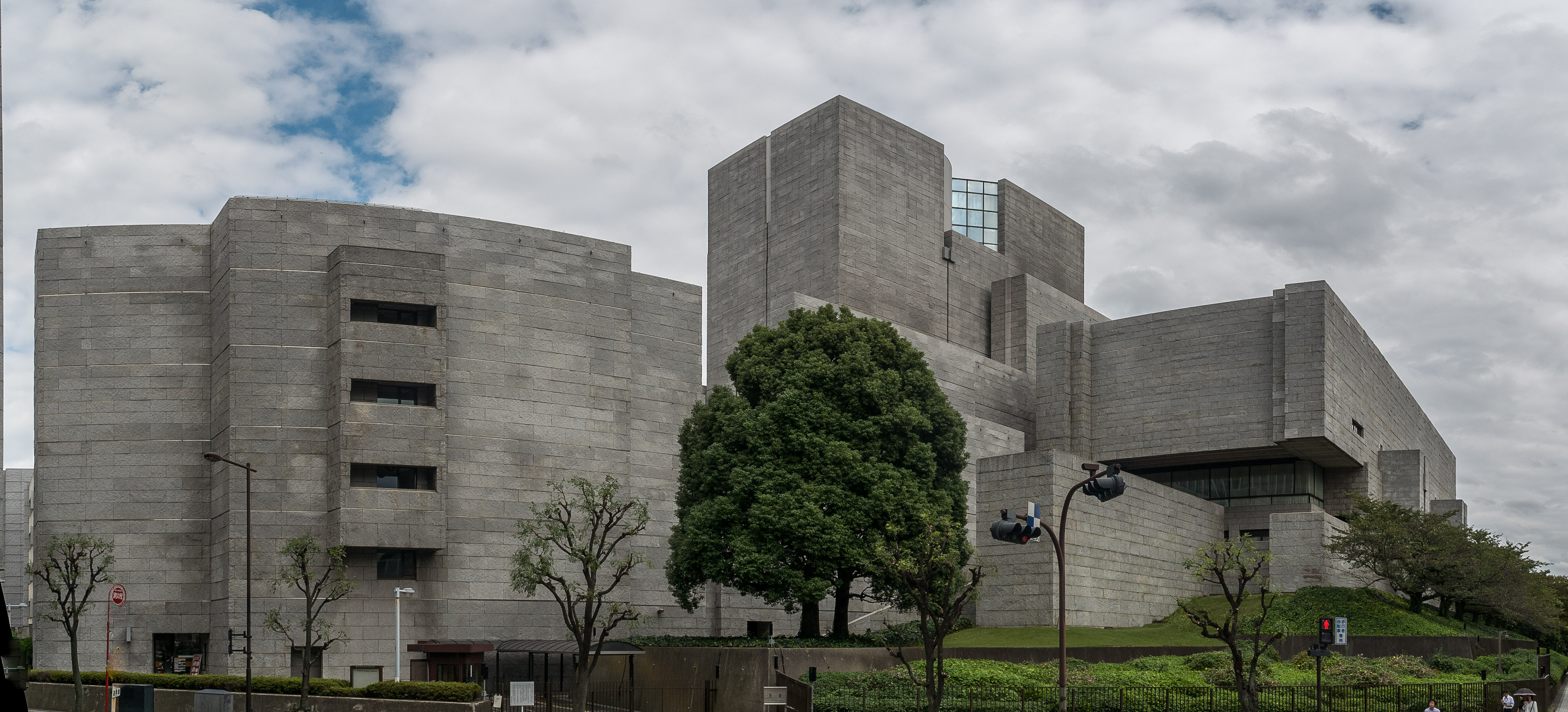
Supreme Court of Japan, Hayabusachō, Chiyoda

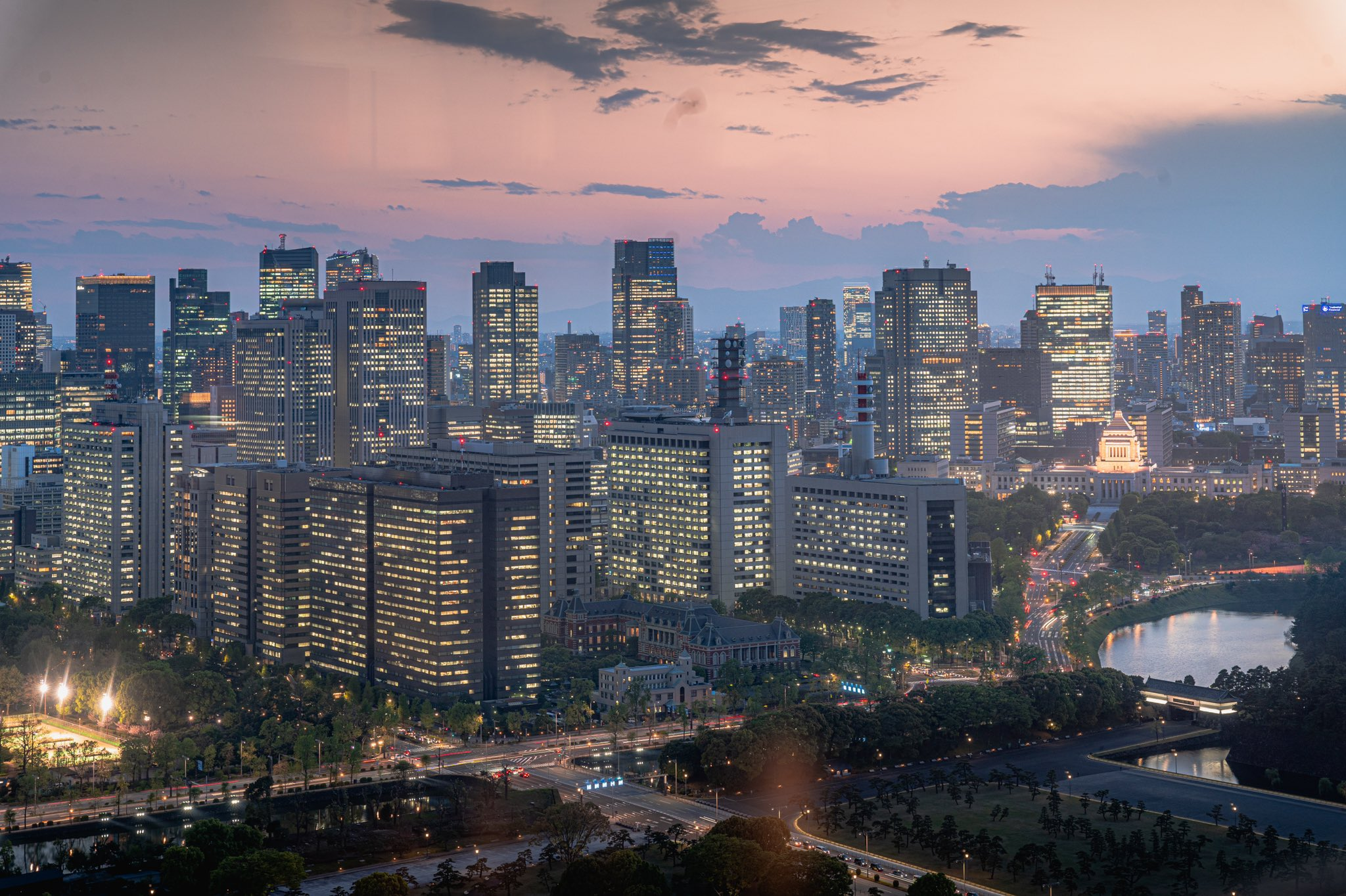
Kasumigaseki (left) and Nagatachō (right) are used as metonyms for the Japanese Civil Service and the National Diet, respectively

Tokyo is the seat of all three branches of government: the legislature (National Diet), the executive (Cabinet led by the Prime Minister), and the judiciary (Supreme Court of Japan), as well as the Emperor of Japan, the head of state. Most government ministries are concentrated in the Kasumigaseki district in Chiyoda, and the name Kasumigaseki is often used as a metonym for the Japanese national civil service. Tokyo has 25 constituencies for the House of Representatives, 18 of which were won by the ruling Liberal Democrats and 7 by the main opposition Constitutional Democrats in the 2021 general election. Apart from these seats, through the Tokyo proportional representation block, Tokyo sends 17 more politicians to the House of Representatives, 6 of whom were members of the ruling LDP in the 2021 election. The Tokyo at-large district, which covers the entire metropolis, sends 12 members to the House of Councillors.

Tokyo is the founding member of the Asian Network of Major Cities 21 and is a member of the Council of Local Authorities for International Relations. Tokyo was also a founding member of the C40 Cities Climate Leadership Group.

== Geography ==
The mainland portion of Tokyo lies northwest of Tokyo Bay and measures about 90 km (56 mi) east to west and 25 km (16 mi) north to south. The average elevation in Tokyo is 40 m (131 ft). Chiba Prefecture borders it to the east, Yamanashi to the west, Kanagawa to the south, and Saitama to the north. Mainland Tokyo is further subdivided into the special wards (occupying the eastern half) and the Tama area (多摩地域) stretching westwards. Tokyo has a latitude of 35.65 (near the 36th parallel north), which makes it more southern than Rome (41.90), New York City (40.71) and Beijing (39.91).

Within the administrative boundaries of Tokyo Metropolis are two island chains in the Pacific Ocean directly south: the Izu Islands, and the Ogasawara Islands, which stretch more than 1,000 km (620 mi) away from the mainland. Because of these islands and the mountainous regions to the west, Tokyo's overall population density figures far under-represent the real figures for the urban and suburban regions of Tokyo.

=== Climate ===
The former city of Tokyo and the majority of Tokyo prefecture lie in the humid subtropical climate zone (Köppen climate classification: Cfa), with hot, humid summers and cool winters with occasional cold spells. The region, like much of Japan, experiences a one-month seasonal lag. The warmest month is August, which averages 26.9 °C (80.4 °F). The coolest month is January, averaging 5.4 °C (41.7 °F). The record low temperature was −9.2 °C (15.4 °F) on January 13, 1876. The record high was 39.5 °C (103.1 °F) on July 20, 2004. The record highest low temperature is 30.4 °C (86.7 °F), on August 11, 2013.

Annual rainfall averages nearly 1,600 millimeters (63.0 in), with a wetter summer and a drier winter. The growing season in Tokyo lasts for about 322 days from around mid-February to early January. Snowfall is sporadic and occurs almost annually. Tokyo often sees typhoons every year, though few are strong. The wettest month since records began in 1876 was October 2004, with 780 millimeters (30 in) of rain, including 270.5 mm (10.65 in) on the ninth of that month. The most recent of four months on record to observe no precipitation is December 1995. Annual precipitation has ranged from 879.5 mm (34.63 in) in 1984 to 2,229.6 mm (87.78 in) in 1938.

Climate data for Kitanomaru Park, Chiyoda, Tokyo (1991–2020 normals, extremes 1875–present)
Month	Jan	Feb	Mar	Apr	May	Jun	Jul	Aug	Sep	Oct	Nov	Dec	Year
Record high °C (°F)	22.6 (72.7)	24.9 (76.8)	28.1 (82.6)	29.2 (84.6)	32.6 (90.7)	36.4 (97.5)	39.5 (103.1)	39.1 (102.4)	38.1 (100.6)	32.6 (90.7)	27.5 (81.5)	24.8 (76.6)	39.5 (103.1)
Mean maximum °C (°F)	15.6 (60.1)	19.0 (66.2)	21.8 (71.2)	25.9 (78.6)	29.4 (84.9)	32.0 (89.6)	35.3 (95.5)	36.1 (97.0)	33.7 (92.7)	28.7 (83.7)	23.1 (73.6)	19.0 (66.2)	36.7 (98.1)
Mean daily maximum °C (°F)	9.8 (49.6)	10.9 (51.6)	14.2 (57.6)	19.4 (66.9)	23.6 (74.5)	26.1 (79.0)	29.9 (85.8)	31.3 (88.3)	27.5 (81.5)	22.0 (71.6)	16.7 (62.1)	12.0 (53.6)	20.3 (68.5)
Daily mean °C (°F)	5.4 (41.7)	6.1 (43.0)	9.4 (48.9)	14.3 (57.7)	18.8 (65.8)	21.9 (71.4)	25.7 (78.3)	26.9 (80.4)	23.3 (73.9)	18.0 (64.4)	12.5 (54.5)	7.7 (45.9)	15.8 (60.4)
Mean daily minimum °C (°F)	1.2 (34.2)	2.1 (35.8)	5.0 (41.0)	9.8 (49.6)	14.6 (58.3)	18.5 (65.3)	22.4 (72.3)	23.5 (74.3)	20.3 (68.5)	14.8 (58.6)	8.8 (47.8)	3.8 (38.8)	12.1 (53.8)
Mean minimum °C (°F)	−0.8 (30.6)	−0.5 (31.1)	1.5 (34.7)	4.9 (40.8)	10.7 (51.3)	15.0 (59.0)	19.0 (66.2)	20.3 (68.5)	16.0 (60.8)	10.9 (51.6)	5.3 (41.5)	1.0 (33.8)	−1.2 (29.8)
Record low °C (°F)	−9.2 (15.4)	−7.9 (17.8)	−5.6 (21.9)	−3.1 (26.4)	2.2 (36.0)	8.5 (47.3)	13.0 (55.4)	15.4 (59.7)	10.5 (50.9)	−0.5 (31.1)	−3.1 (26.4)	−6.8 (19.8)	−9.2 (15.4)
Average precipitation mm (inches)	59.7 (2.35)	56.5 (2.22)	116.0 (4.57)	133.7 (5.26)	139.7 (5.50)	167.8 (6.61)	156.2 (6.15)	154.7 (6.09)	224.9 (8.85)	234.8 (9.24)	96.3 (3.79)	57.9 (2.28)	1,598.2 (62.92)
Average snowfall cm (inches)	4 (1.6)	4 (1.6)	0 (0)	0 (0)	0 (0)	0 (0)	0 (0)	0 (0)	0 (0)	0 (0)	0 (0)	0 (0)	8 (3.1)
Average precipitation days (≥ 0.5 mm)	5.3	6.1	10.3	10.9	11.1	12.8	12.0	9.4	12.3	11.8	8.2	5.8	116.0
Average relative humidity (%)	51	52	57	62	68	75	76	74	75	71	64	56	65
Average dew point °C (°F)	−5 (23)	−4 (25)	1 (34)	8 (46)	13 (55)	18 (64)	22 (72)	23 (73)	19 (66)	12 (54)	6 (43)	−1 (30)	9 (49)
Mean monthly sunshine hours	192.6	170.4	175.3	178.8	179.6	124.2	151.4	174.2	126.7	129.4	149.8	174.4	1,926.7
Percentage possible sunshine	61	56	47	45	41	30	34	42	34	37	48	57	44
Average ultraviolet index	2	3	5	7	9	10	10	9	7	5	3	2	6
Source 1: Japan Meteorological Agency
Source 2: Weather Atlas (UV), Time and Date (dewpoints, 1985–2015)

Climate data for Tokyo, 1876–1905 normals
Month	Jan	Feb	Mar	Apr	May	Jun	Jul	Aug	Sep	Oct	Nov	Dec	Year
Mean maximum °C (°F)	14.9 (58.8)	15.7 (60.3)	19.6 (67.3)	24.0 (75.2)	26.9 (80.4)	30.0 (86.0)	32.5 (90.5)	33.4 (92.1)	31.6 (88.9)	26.1 (79.0)	21.6 (70.9)	17.7 (63.9)	34.0 (93.2)
Mean daily maximum °C (°F)	8.3 (46.9)	8.7 (47.7)	11.9 (53.4)	17.2 (63.0)	21.1 (70.0)	24.5 (76.1)	28.1 (82.6)	29.8 (85.6)	26.1 (79.0)	20.5 (68.9)	15.5 (59.9)	11.0 (51.8)	18.6 (65.5)
Daily mean °C (°F)	2.9 (37.2)	3.6 (38.5)	6.9 (44.4)	12.4 (54.3)	16.6 (61.9)	20.5 (68.9)	24.1 (75.4)	25.5 (77.9)	22.1 (71.8)	15.9 (60.6)	10.2 (50.4)	5.3 (41.5)	13.8 (56.8)
Mean daily minimum °C (°F)	−1.7 (28.9)	−0.9 (30.4)	2.0 (35.6)	7.6 (45.7)	12.0 (53.6)	16.8 (62.2)	20.8 (69.4)	21.9 (71.4)	18.6 (65.5)	11.9 (53.4)	5.4 (41.7)	0.4 (32.7)	9.6 (49.3)
Mean minimum °C (°F)	−6.1 (21.0)	−5.4 (22.3)	−2.8 (27.0)	1.1 (34.0)	6.1 (43.0)	11.7 (53.1)	16.0 (60.8)	18.2 (64.8)	13.1 (55.6)	5.6 (42.1)	−0.1 (31.8)	−4.2 (24.4)	−6.8 (19.8)
Average precipitation mm (inches)	55.2 (2.17)	72.4 (2.85)	111.0 (4.37)	129.1 (5.08)	151.9 (5.98)	166.3 (6.55)	139.7 (5.50)	114.7 (4.52)	203.3 (8.00)	184.1 (7.25)	104.7 (4.12)	58.7 (2.31)	1,491.1 (58.7)
Mean monthly sunshine hours	186.7	178.5	174.1	183.1	204.8	158.5	183.9	207.0	142.8	144.0	167.4	190.8	2,121.6
Source: Japan Meteorological Agency

==== Offshore territories ====
The climates of Tokyo's offshore territories vary significantly from those of the city. The climate of Chichijima in Ogasawara village is on the boundary between the tropical savanna climate (Köppen classification: Aw) and the tropical rainforest climate (Köppen classification: Af). It is approximately 1,000 km (621 mi) south of the Greater Tokyo Area, resulting in much different climatic conditions. Tokyo's easternmost territory, the island of Minamitorishima in Ogasawara village, is in the tropical savanna climate zone (Köppen classification: Aw). Tokyo's Izu and Ogasawara islands are affected by an average of 5.4 typhoons a year, compared to 3.1 in mainland Kantō.

Climate data for Chichijima, Ogasawara, Tokyo, 1991–2020 normals, extremes 1968–present
Month	Jan	Feb	Mar	Apr	May	Jun	Jul	Aug	Sep	Oct	Nov	Dec	Year
Record high °C (°F)	26.1 (79.0)	25.4 (77.7)	26.7 (80.1)	28.6 (83.5)	30.5 (86.9)	33.0 (91.4)	34.4 (93.9)	34.2 (93.6)	33.2 (91.8)	32.7 (90.9)	30.2 (86.4)	27.5 (81.5)	34.4 (93.9)
Mean maximum °C (°F)	23.6 (74.5)	23.6 (74.5)	24.8 (76.6)	26.3 (79.3)	28.4 (83.1)	31.1 (88.0)	32.2 (90.0)	32.1 (89.8)	31.6 (88.9)	30.5 (86.9)	28.6 (83.5)	26.1 (79.0)	32.6 (90.7)
Mean daily maximum °C (°F)	20.7 (69.3)	20.5 (68.9)	21.7 (71.1)	23.4 (74.1)	25.6 (78.1)	28.5 (83.3)	30.4 (86.7)	30.3 (86.5)	29.9 (85.8)	28.6 (83.5)	25.9 (78.6)	22.7 (72.9)	25.7 (78.3)
Daily mean °C (°F)	18.5 (65.3)	18.1 (64.6)	19.3 (66.7)	21.1 (70.0)	23.4 (74.1)	26.2 (79.2)	27.7 (81.9)	28.0 (82.4)	27.7 (81.9)	26.4 (79.5)	23.8 (74.8)	20.6 (69.1)	23.4 (74.1)
Mean daily minimum °C (°F)	15.8 (60.4)	15.4 (59.7)	16.8 (62.2)	18.8 (65.8)	21.4 (70.5)	24.4 (75.9)	25.6 (78.1)	26.1 (79.0)	25.7 (78.3)	24.4 (75.9)	21.6 (70.9)	18.2 (64.8)	21.2 (70.2)
Mean minimum °C (°F)	12.0 (53.6)	11.7 (53.1)	12.7 (54.9)	14.6 (58.3)	17.5 (63.5)	21.0 (69.8)	23.6 (74.5)	23.9 (75.0)	23.5 (74.3)	21.1 (70.0)	17.8 (64.0)	14.3 (57.7)	11.3 (52.3)
Record low °C (°F)	8.9 (48.0)	7.8 (46.0)	9.2 (48.6)	10.7 (51.3)	13.9 (57.0)	17.7 (63.9)	20.8 (69.4)	22.2 (72.0)	19.6 (67.3)	17.2 (63.0)	13.2 (55.8)	10.8 (51.4)	7.8 (46.0)
Average rainfall mm (inches)	63.6 (2.50)	51.6 (2.03)	75.8 (2.98)	113.3 (4.46)	151.9 (5.98)	111.8 (4.40)	79.5 (3.13)	123.3 (4.85)	144.2 (5.68)	141.7 (5.58)	136.1 (5.36)	103.3 (4.07)	1,296.1 (51.02)
Average rainy days (≥ 0.5 mm)	11.0	8.5	9.8	10.0	11.8	8.8	8.6	11.3	13.4	13.7	12.0	11.2	130.1
Average relative humidity (%)	66	68	72	79	84	86	82	82	82	81	76	70	77
Mean monthly sunshine hours	131.3	138.3	159.2	148.3	151.8	205.6	246.8	213.7	197.7	173.2	139.1	125.3	2,030.3
Source: Japan Meteorological Agency

=== Natural disasters ===
==== Earthquakes ====
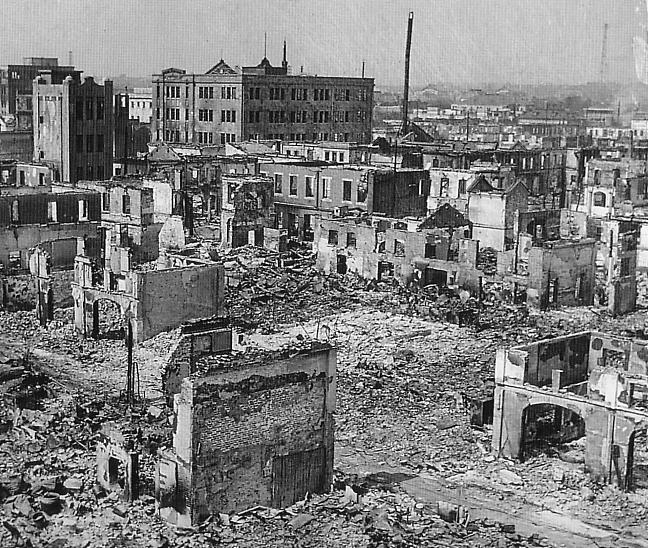
The Great Kanto Earthquake in 1923 killed more than 100,000 citizens in Tokyo.

Tokyo is near the boundary of three plates, making it an extremely active region for smaller quakes and slippage which frequently affect the urban area with swaying as if in a boat, although epicenters within mainland Tokyo (excluding Tokyo's 2,000 km (1,243 mi)–long island jurisdiction) are quite rare. It is not uncommon in the metro area to have hundreds of these minor quakes (magnitudes 4–6) that can be felt in a single year, something residents merely brush off but can be a source of anxiety not only for foreign visitors but for Japanese from elsewhere as well. They rarely cause much damage (sometimes a few injuries) as they are either too small or far away, as quakes tend to dance around the region. Particularly active are offshore regions and to a lesser extent Chiba and Ibaraki.

Tokyo has been hit by powerful megathrust earthquakes in 1703, 1782, 1812, 1855, 1923, and much more indirectly (with some liquefaction in landfill zones) in 2011; the frequency of direct and large quakes is a relative rarity. The 1923 earthquake, with an estimated magnitude of 7.9, killed more than 100,000 people, the last time the urban area was directly hit.

==== Volcanic eruptions ====
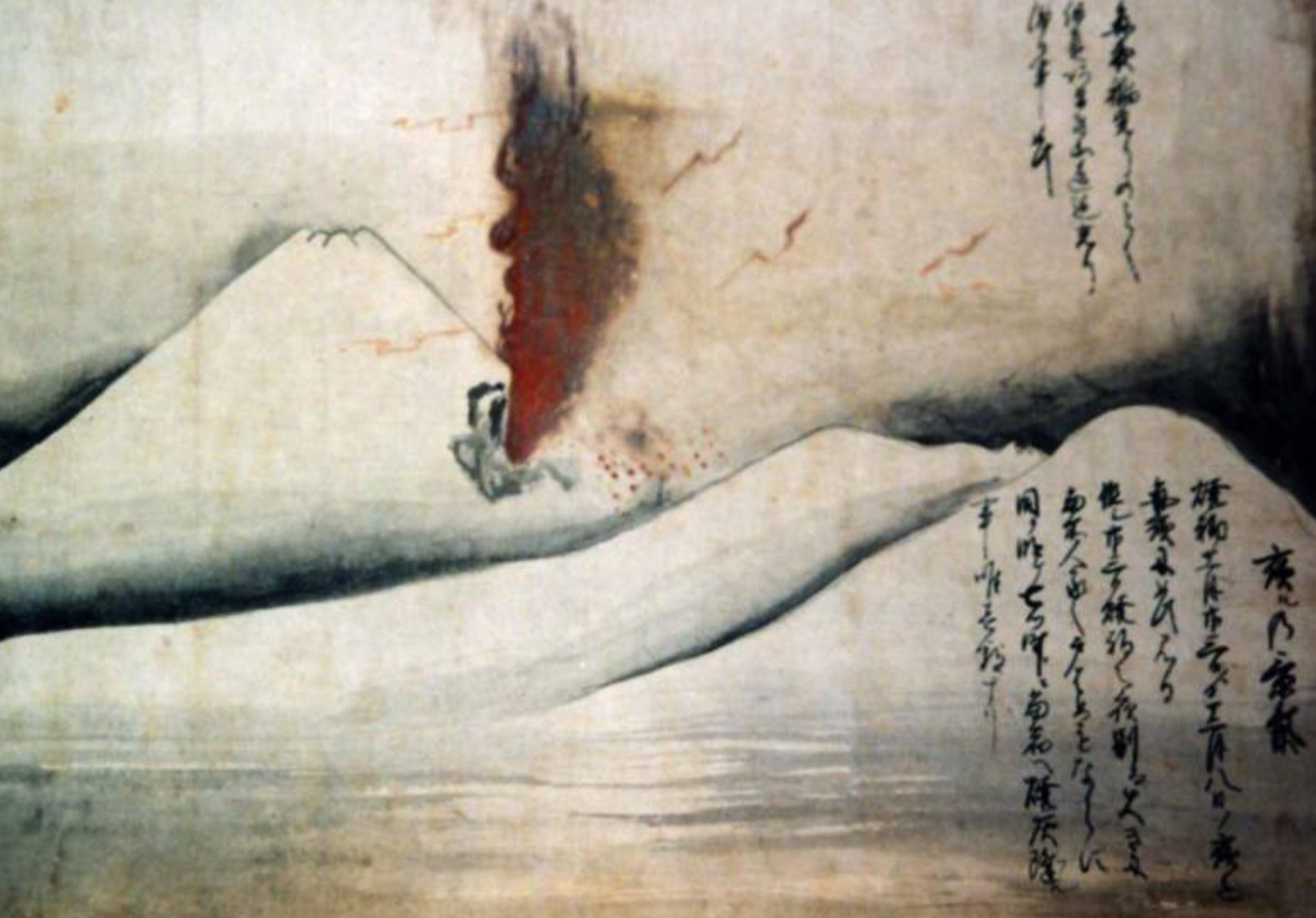
Mount Fuji has posed the primary volcanic threat to Tokyo's citizens for centuries.

Mount Fuji is about 100 km (62 mi) southwest of Tokyo. There is a low risk of eruption. The last recorded was the Hōei eruption which started on December 16, 1707, and ended about January 1, 1708 (16 days). During the Hōei eruption, the ash amount was 4 cm in southern Tokyo (bay area) and 2 cm to 0.5 cm in central Tokyo. Kanagawa had 16 cm to 8 cm ash and Saitama 0.5 to 0 cm. If the wind blows north-east it could send volcanic ash to Tokyo metropolis. According to the government, less than a millimeter of the volcanic ash from a Mount Fuji eruption could cause power grid problems such as blackouts and stop trains in the Tokyo metropolitan area. A mixture of ash with rain could stick to cellphone antennas and power lines and cause temporary power outages. The affected areas would need to be evacuated.

==== Floods ====
Tokyo is located on the Kantō Plain with five river systems and dozens of rivers that expand during each season. Important rivers are Edogawa, Nakagawa, Arakawa, Kandagawa, Megurogawa and Tamagawa. In 1947, Typhoon Kathleen struck Tokyo, destroying 31,000 homes and killing 1,100 people. In 1958, Typhoon Ida dropped 400 mm (16 in) of rain in a single week, causing streets to flood. In the 1950s and 1960s, the government invested 6–7% of the national budget on disaster and risk reduction. A huge system of dams, levees, and tunnels was constructed. The purpose is to manage heavy rain, typhonic rain, and river floods.

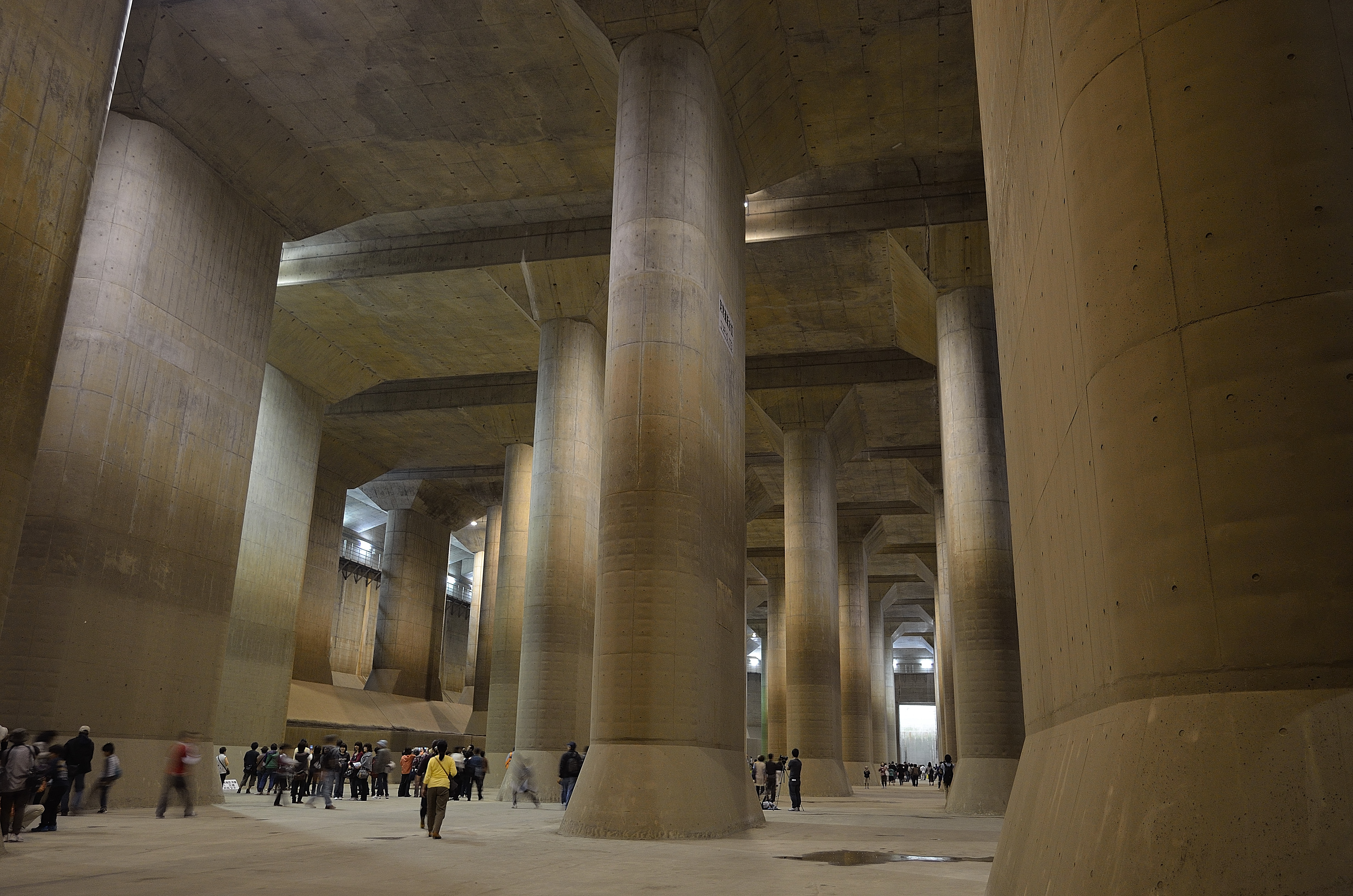
The MAOUDC is the world's largest underground floodwater diversion facility.

Tokyo has currently the world's largest underground floodwater diversion facility called the Metropolitan Area Outer Underground Discharge Channel (MAOUDC). It took 13 years to build and was completed in 2006. The MAOUDC is a 6.3 km (3.9 mi) long system of tunnels, 22 meters (72 ft) underground, with 70-meter (230 ft) tall cylindrical tanks, each tank being large enough to fit a Space Shuttle or the Statue of Liberty. During floods, excess water is collected from rivers and drained to the Edo River. Low-lying areas of Kōtō, Edogawa, Sumida, Katsushika, Taitō and Arakawa near the Arakawa River are most at risk of flooding.

=== Architecture ===
Tokyo's buildings are too diverse to be characterized by any specific architectural style, but it can be generally said that a majority of extant structures were built in the past hundred years. Twice in recent history has the metropolis been left in ruins: first in the 1923 Great Kantō earthquake and later after extensive firebombing in World War II.

==== Early modern (1407–1868) ====
Extant pre-17th century structures in Tokyo

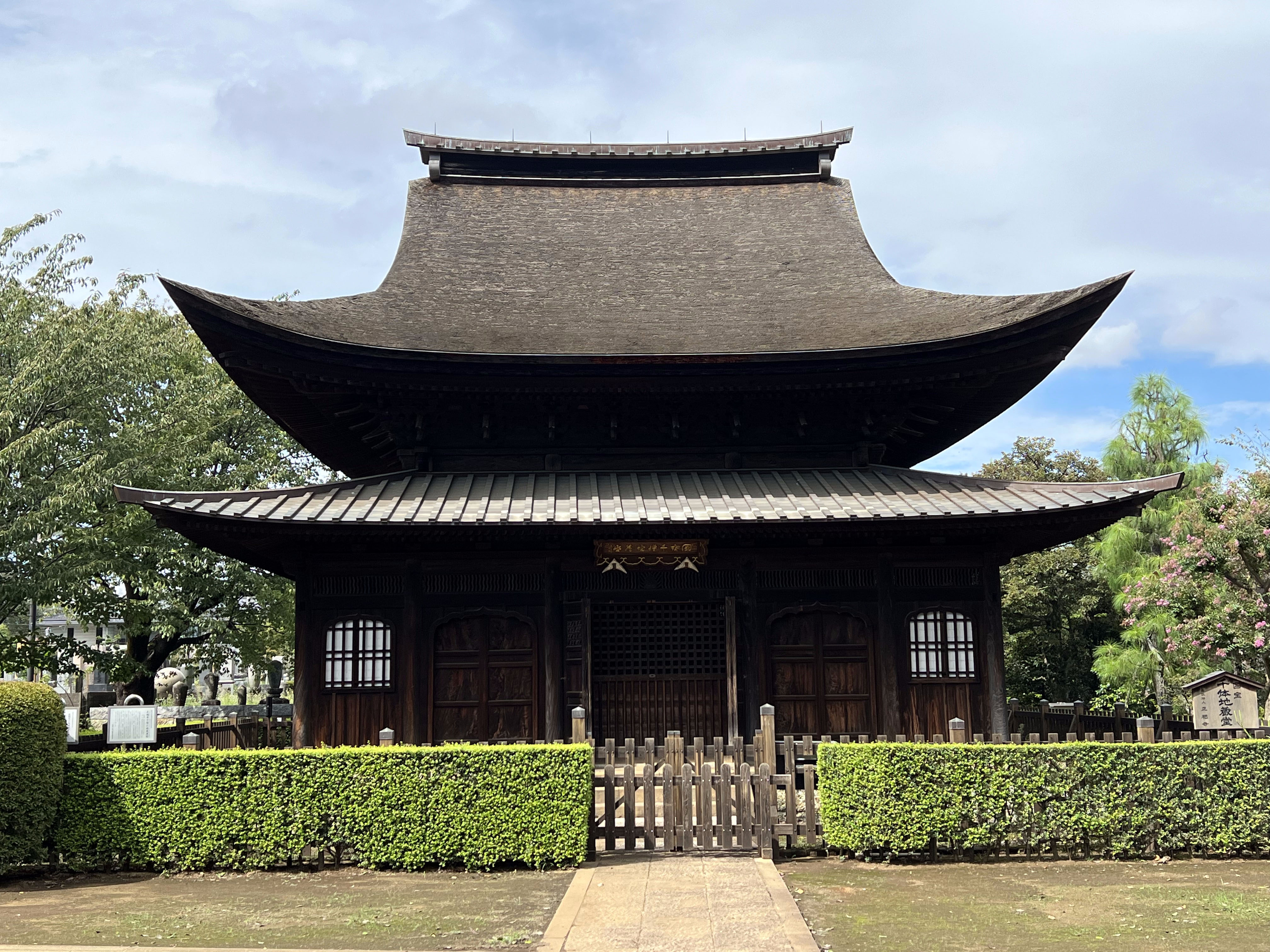
Shōfuku-ji, built in 1407

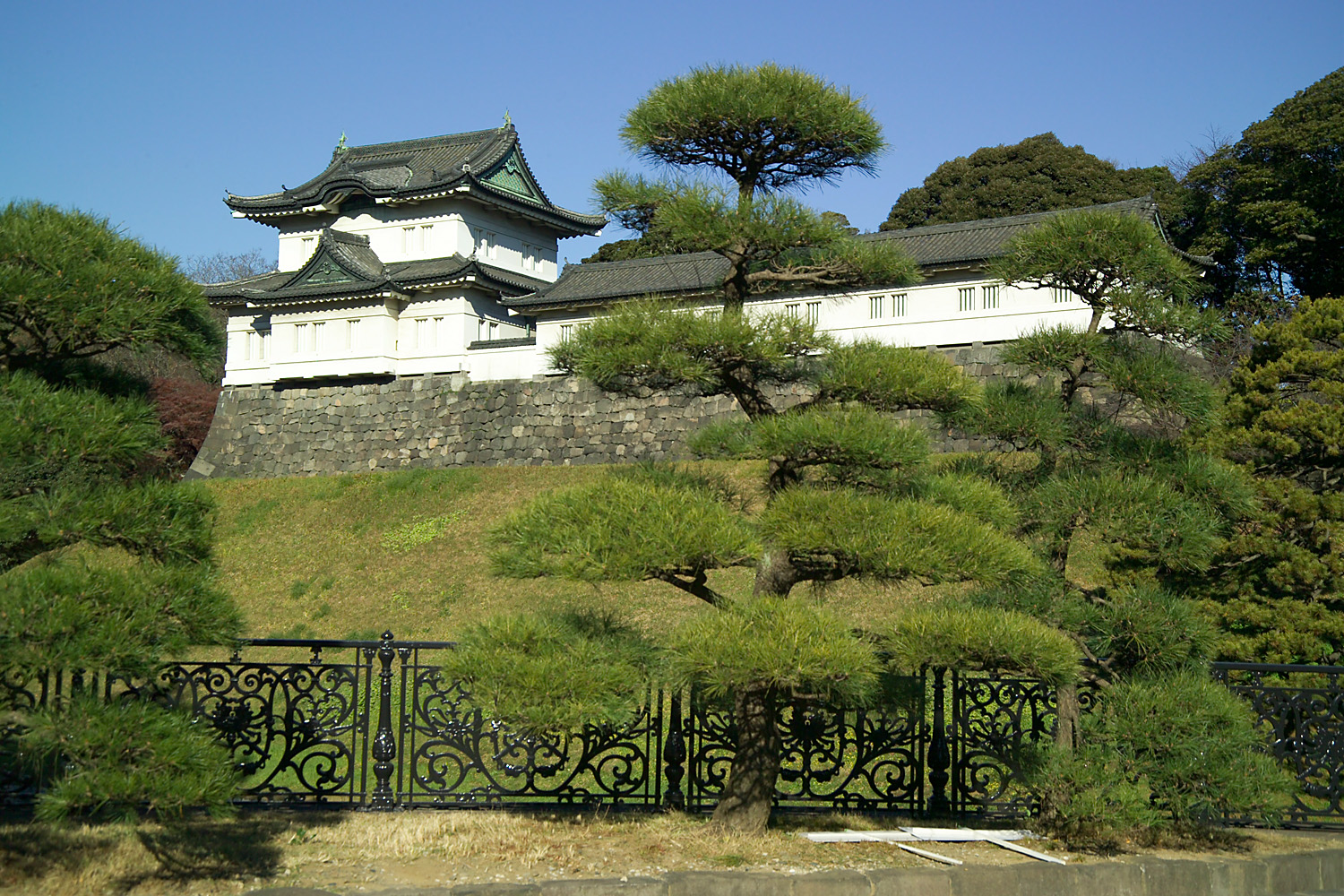
A lookout tower at the Imperial Palace, formerly Edo Castle

The oldest known extant building in Tokyo is Shofukuji in Higashi-Murayama. The current building was constructed in 1407, during the Muromachi period (1336–1573). Although greatly reduced in number by later fires, earthquakes, and air raids, a considerable number of Edo-era buildings survive to this day. The Tokyo Imperial Palace, which was occupied by the Tokugawa Shogunate as Edo Castle during the Edo Period (1603–1868), has many gates and towers dating from that era, although the main palace buildings and the tenshu tower have been lost.

Numerous temple and shrine buildings in Tokyo date from this era: the Ueno Toshogu still maintains the original 1651 building built by the third shogun Iemitsu Tokugawa. Although partially destroyed during the Second World War, Zojo-ji, which houses the Tokugawa family mausoleum, still has grand Edo-era buildings such as the Sangedatsu gate. Kaneiji has grand 17th-century buildings such as the five-storey pagoda and the Shimizudo. The Nezu Shrine and Gokokuji were built by the fifth shogun Tsunayoshi Tokugawa in the late 1600s. All feudal lords (daimyo) had large Edo houses where they stayed when in Edo; at one point, these houses amounted to half the total area of Edo. None of the grand Edo-era daimyo houses still exist in Tokyo, as their vast land footprint made them easy targets for redevelopment programs for modernization during the Meiji Period. Some gardens were immune from such fates and are today open to the public; Hamarikyu (Kofu Tokugawa family), Shibarikyu (Kishu Tokugawa family), Koishikawa Korakuen (Mito Tokugawa family), Rikugien (Yanagisawa family), and Higo Hosokawa Garden (Hosokawa family). The Akamon, which is now widely seen as a symbol of the University of Tokyo, was originally built to commemorate the marriage of a shogun's daughter into the Maeda clan, one of the most affluent of the feudal lords, while the campus itself occupies their former edo estate.

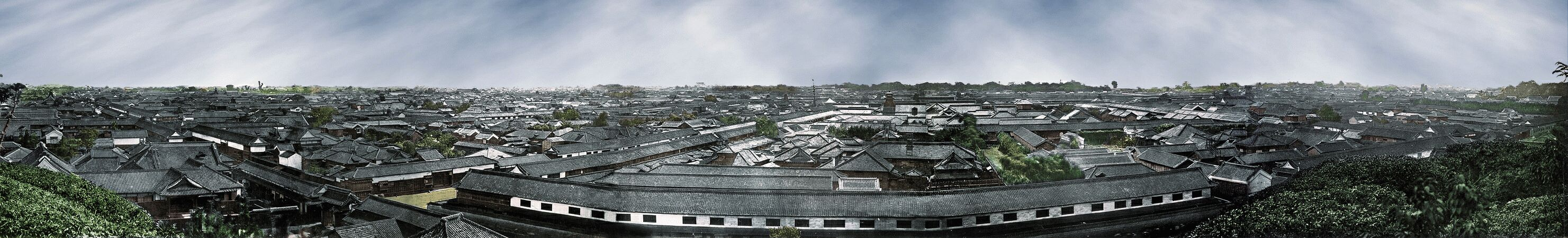
Edo, 1865 or 1866. Photochrom print. Five albumen prints joined to form a panorama. Photographer: Felice Beato.

==== Modern (1869–1945) ====
Extant brick or stone buildings in Tokyo

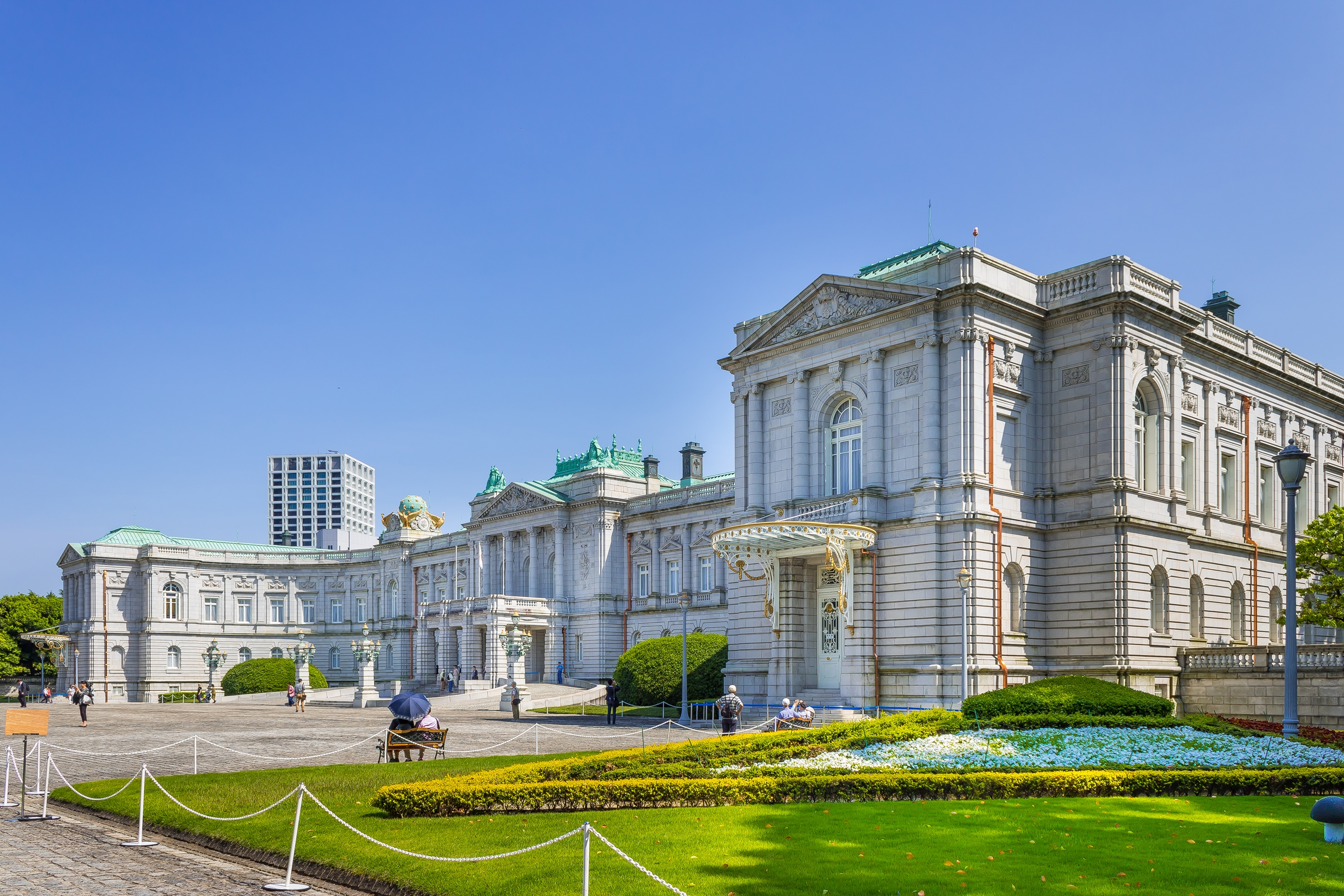
Akasaka State Guest House, originally the Crown Prince's residence, built in 1909

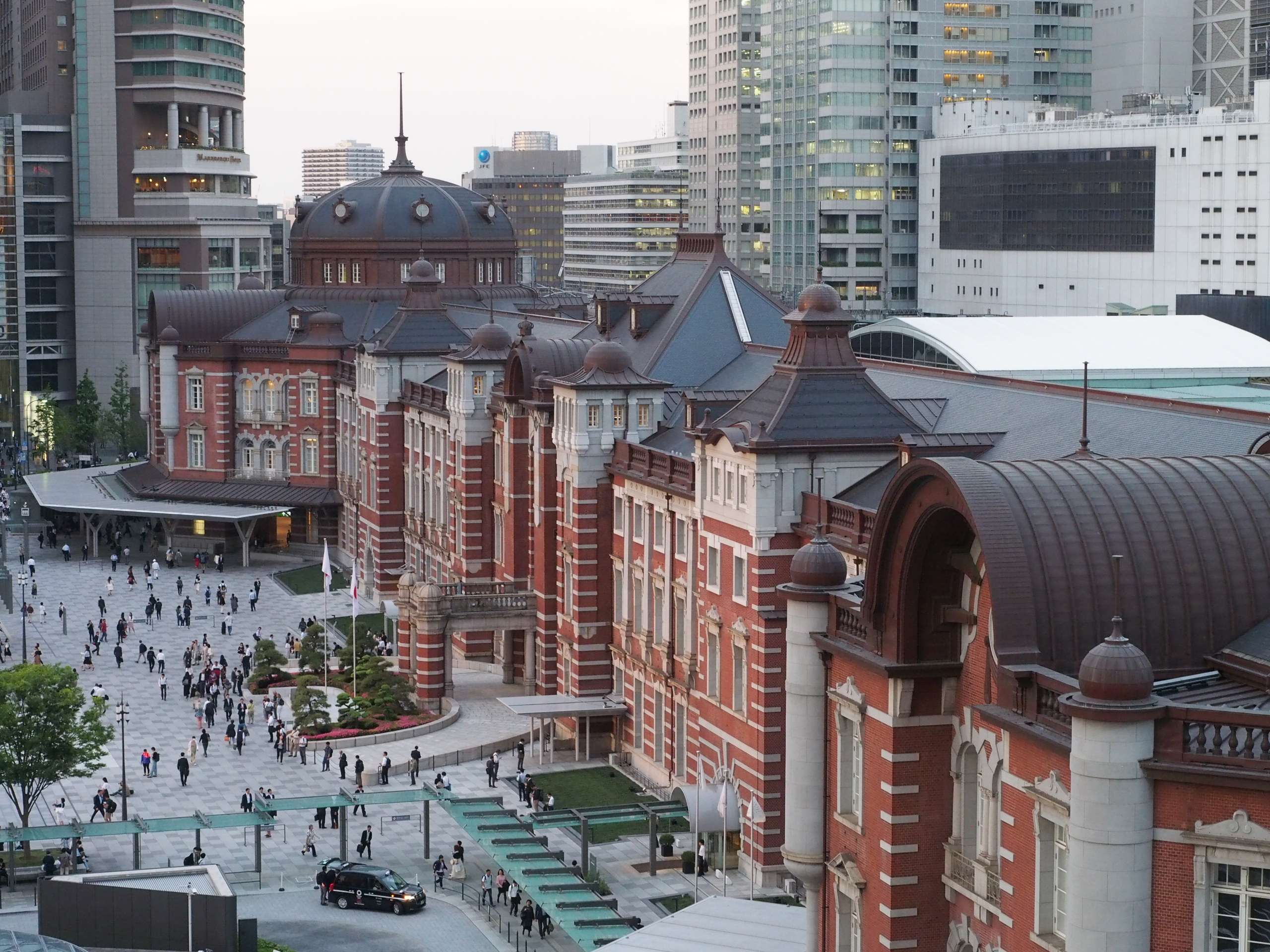
Tokyo Station, built in 1914

The Meiji era saw a rapid modernization in architectural styles as well; until the Great Kanto Earthquake in 1923 exposed their weakness to seismic shocks, grand brick buildings were constantly built across the city. Tokyo Station (1914), the Ministry of Justice building (1895), the International Library of Children's Literature (1906), and Mitsubishi building one (1894, rebuilt in 2010) are some of the few brick survivors from this period. It was regarded as fashionable by some members of the Japanese aristocracy to build their Tokyo residences in grand and modern styles, and some of these buildings still exist, although most are in private hands and open to the public on limited occasions. Aristocratic residences today open to the public include the Marquess Maeda residence in Komaba, the Baron Iwasaki residence in Ikenohata, and the Baron Furukawa residence in Nishigahara.

Extant concrete buildings from the interwar period

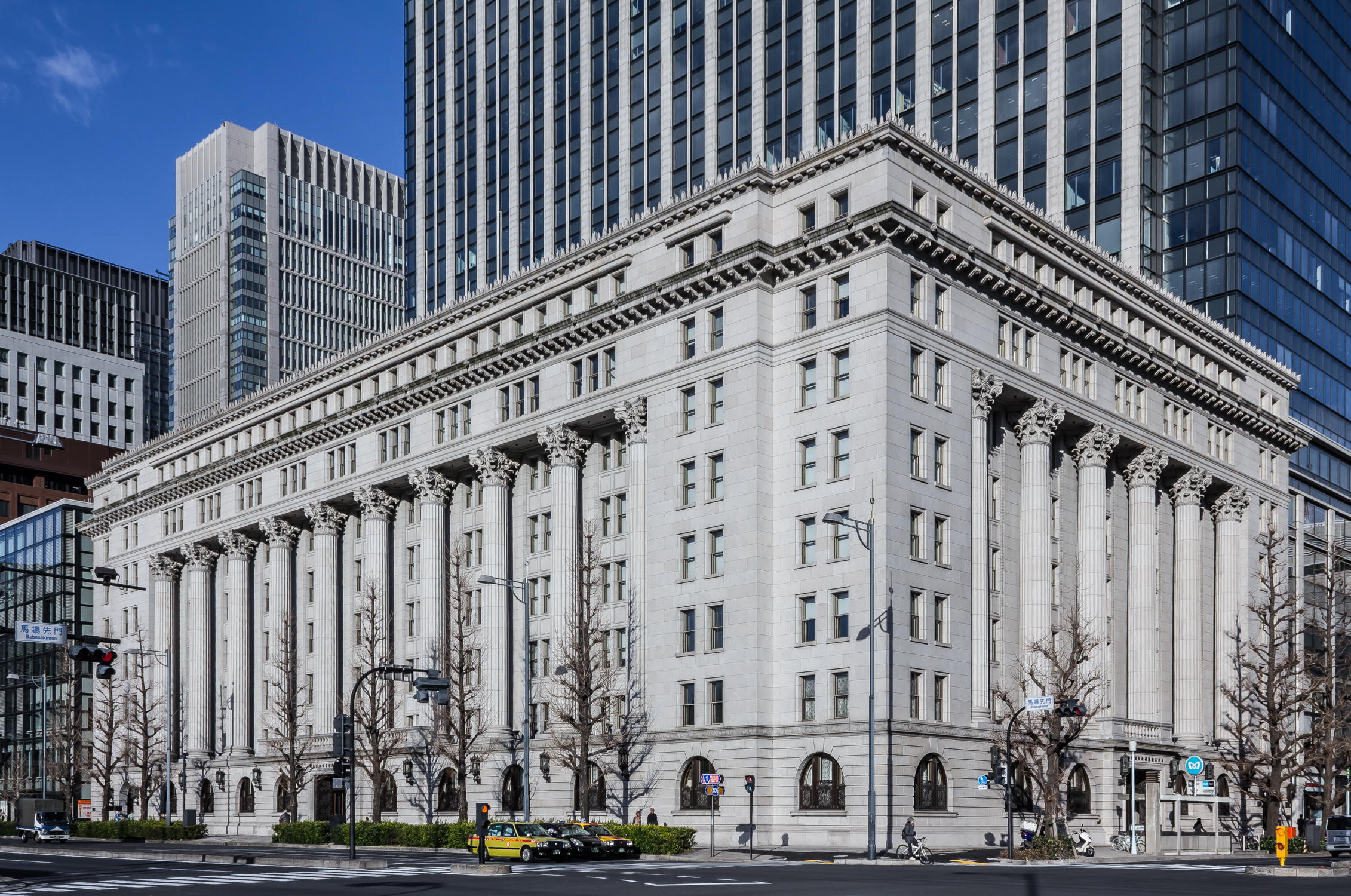
Meiji Insurance Headquarters, completed in 1934

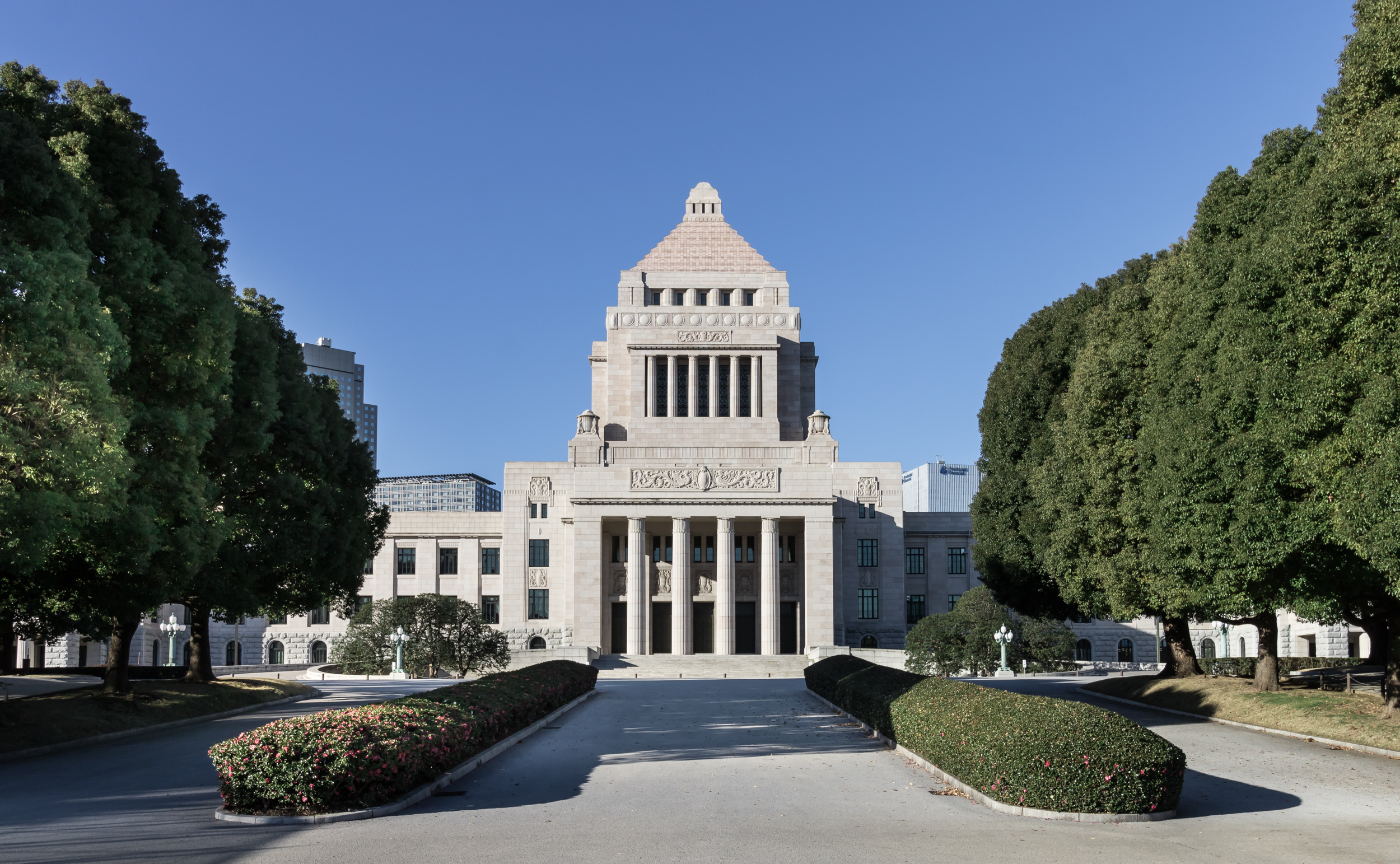
National Diet Building, built between 1920 and 1936

The Great Kanto Earthquake in 1923 ushered in an era of concrete architecture. Surviving reinforced concrete buildings from this era include the Meiji Insurance Headquarters (completed in 1934), the Mitsui Headquarters (1929), Mitsukoshi Nihonbashi flagship store (1914, refurbished in 1925), Takashimaya Nihonbashi flagship store (1932), Wako in Ginza (1932) and Isetan Shinjuku flagship store (1933). This spread of earthquake and fire-resistant architecture reached council housing too, most notably the Dōjunkai apartments.

The 1930s saw the rise of styles that combined characteristics of both traditional Japanese and modern designs. Chuta Ito was a leading figure in this movement, and his extant works in Tokyo include Tsukiji Hongan-ji (1934). The Imperial Crown Style, which often features Japanese-style roofs on top of elevated concrete structures, was adopted for the Tokyo National Museum in Ueno and the Kudan Hall in Kudanminami.

==== Contemporary (1946–present) ====
Contemporary buildings in Tokyo

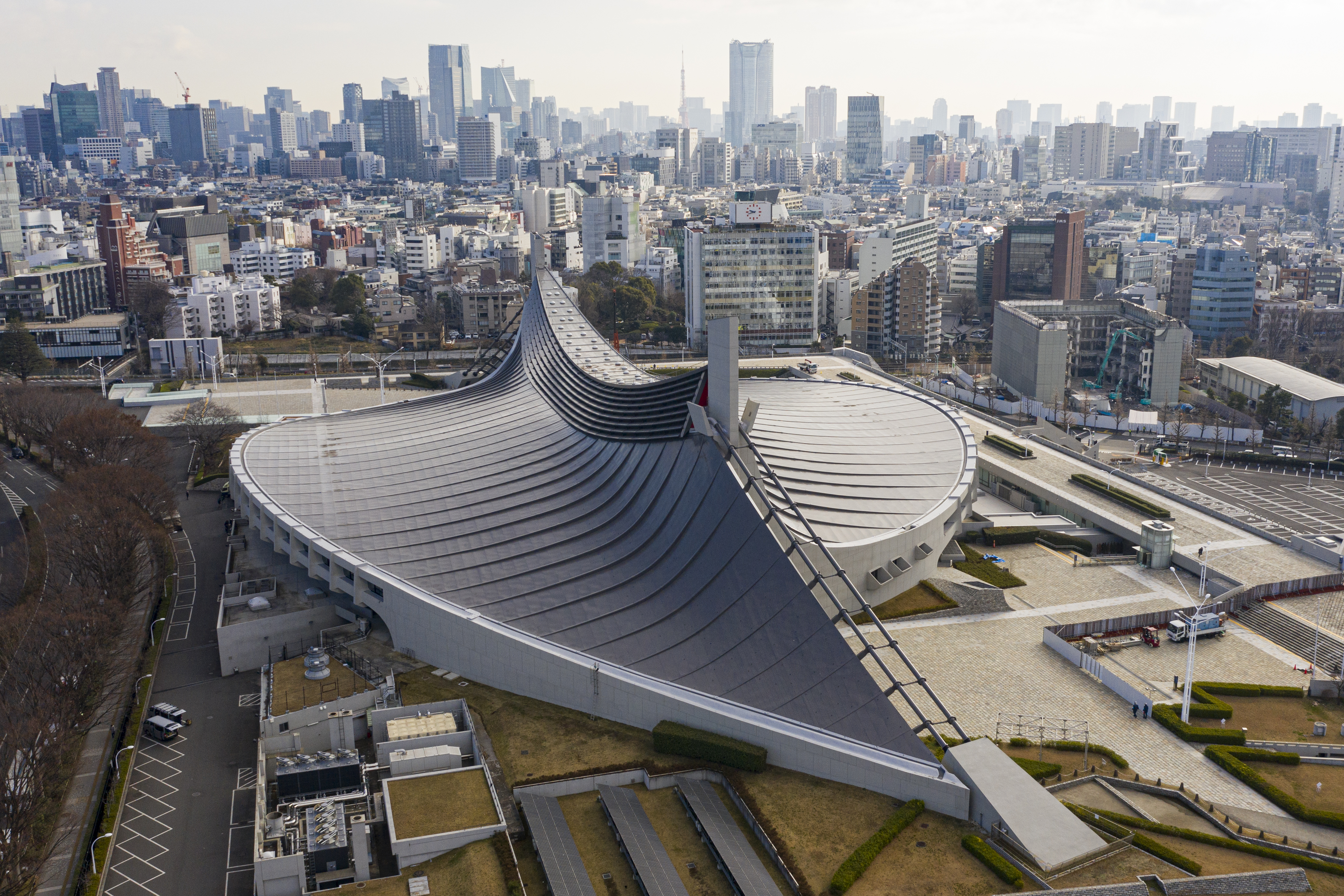
Yoyogi National Gymnasium, completed in 1964

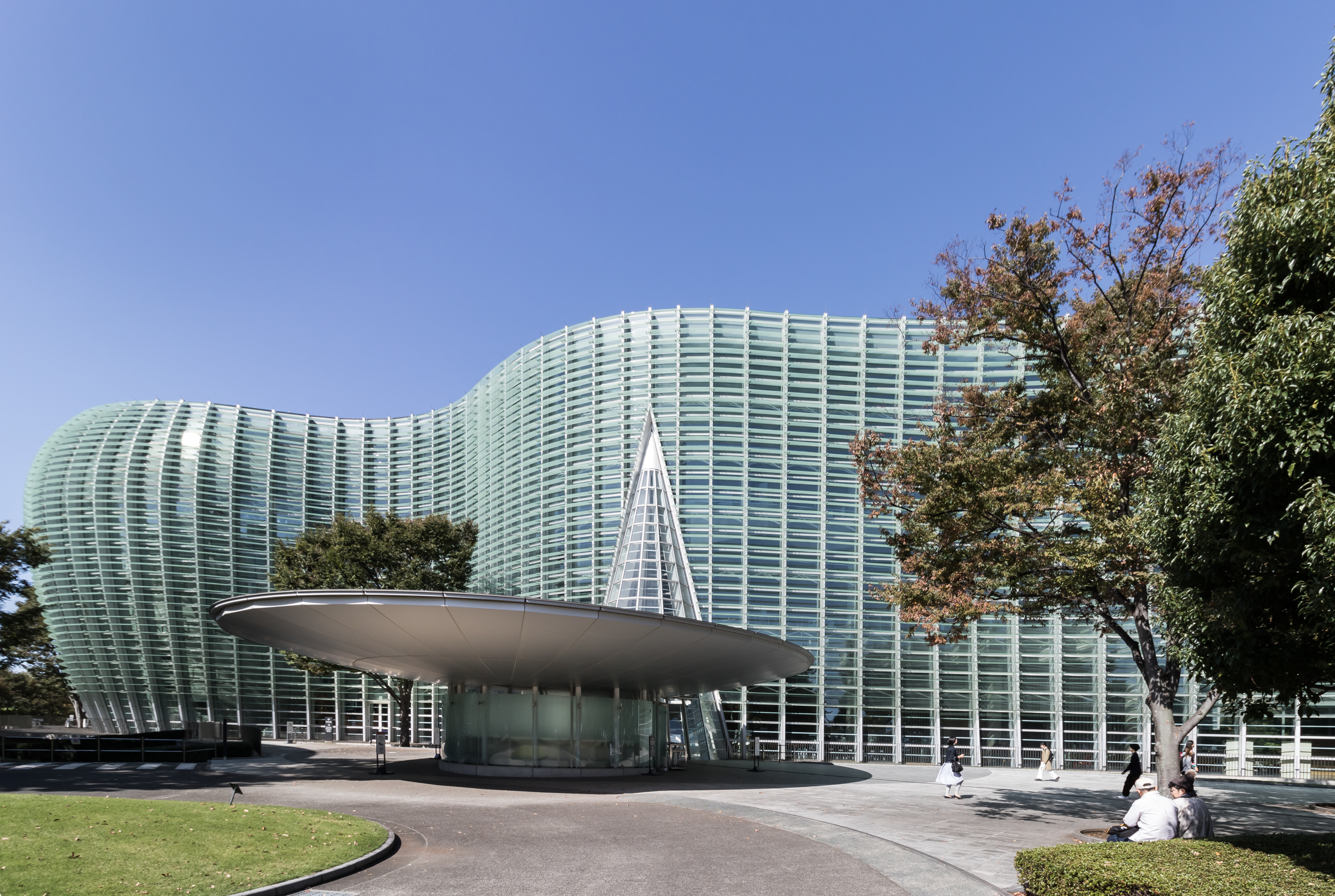
National Art Center, completed in 2007

Since the 30-metre height restriction was lifted in the 1960s, Tokyo's most dense areas have been dominated by skyscrapers. As of May 2024, at least 184 buildings are exceeding 150 metres (492 feet) in Tokyo. Apart from these, Tokyo Tower (333m) and Tokyo Skytree (634m) feature high-elevation observation decks; the latter is the tallest tower in both Japan and the world, and the third tallest structure in the world. With a scheduled completion date in 2027, Torch Tower (385m) will overtake Azabudai Hills Mori JP Tower (325.2m) as the tallest building in Tokyo.

Kenzo Tange designed notable contemporary buildings in Tokyo, including Yoyogi National Gymnasium (1964), St. Mary's Cathedral (1967), and the Tokyo Metropolitan Government Building (1991). Kisho Kurokawa was also active in the city, and his works there include the National Art Center (2005) and the Nakagin Capsule Tower (1972). Other notable contemporary buildings in Tokyo include the Tokyo Dome, Mode Gakuen Cocoon Tower, Roppongi Hills, Tokyo International Forum, and Asahi Beer Hall.

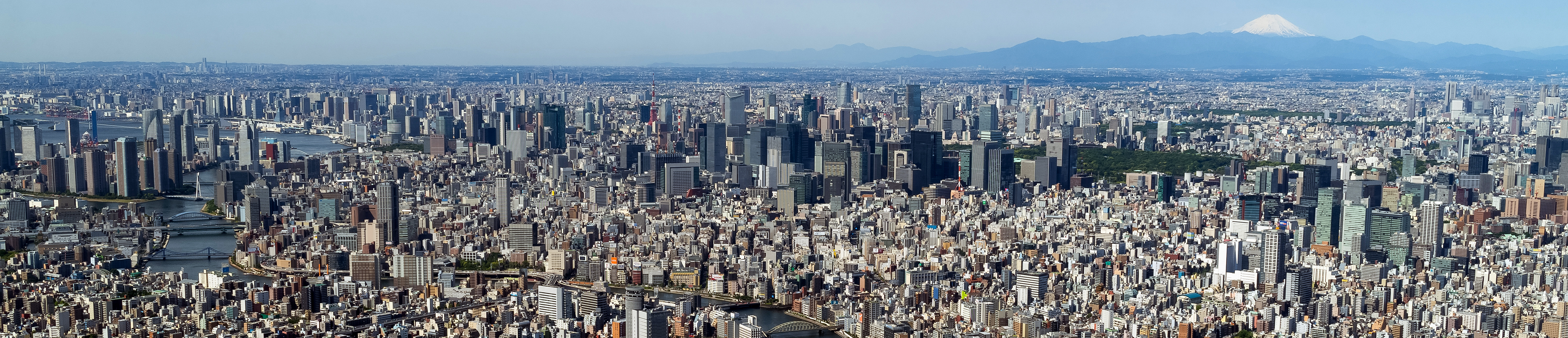
A panoramic view of Tokyo from the Tokyo Skytree

== Demographics ==
Tokyo metropolis population pyramid in 2020

Historical population

Year	Pop.	±%
1872	859,345	—
1880	1,084,745	+26.2%
1890	1,385,700	+27.7%
1900	1,947,300	+40.5%
1910	2,706,800	+39.0%
1920	3,699,428	+36.7%
1930	5,408,678	+46.2%
1940	7,354,971	+36.0%
1945	3,488,284	−52.6%
1950	6,277,500	+80.0%
1955	8,037,084	+28.0%
1960	9,683,802	+20.5%

Year	Pop.	±%
1965	10,869,244	+12.2%
1970	11,408,071	+5.0%
1975	11,673,554	+2.3%
1980	11,618,281	−0.5%
1985	11,829,363	+1.8%
1990	11,855,563	+0.2%
1995	11,773,605	−0.7%
2000	12,064,101	+2.5%
2005	12,576,601	+4.2%
2010	13,159,388	+4.6%
2015	13,515,271	+2.7%
2020	13,982,112	+3.5%

Source: Tokyo Metropolitan Government

As of October 2012, the official intercensal estimate showed 13.506 million people in Tokyo, with 9.214 million living within Tokyo's 23 wards. During the daytime, the population swells by over 2.5 million as workers and students commute from adjacent areas. This effect is even more pronounced in the three central wards of Chiyoda, Chūō, and Minato, whose collective population as of the 2005 National Census was 326,000 at night, but 2.4 million during the day.

According to April 2024 official estimates, Setagaya (942,003), Nerima (752,608), and Ota (748,081) were the most populous wards and municipalities in Tokyo. The least inhabited of all Tokyo municipalities are remote island villages such as Aogashima (150), Mikurajima (289), and Toshima (306).

=== Age structure and average age ===
In 2021, Tokyo's average and median ages were both 45.5 years old. This is below the national median age of 49.0, placing Tokyo among the youngest regions in Japan. 16.8% of the population was below 15, while 34.6% was above 65. In the same year, the youngest municipalities in Tokyo were Mikura-jima (average age 40.72), Chūō (41.92), and Chiyoda (42.07), while the oldest included Okutama (59.11) and Miyake (53.82).

=== Immigration ===
In 1889, the Home Ministry recorded 1,375,937 people in Tokyo City and a total of 1,694,292 people in Tokyo-fu. In the same year, a total of 779 foreign nationals were recorded as residing in Tokyo. The most common nationality was English (209 residents), followed by American (182) and Chinese nationals (137).

As of January 2024, Tokyo had 647,416 foreign nationals registered as residents, with China, South Korea, Vietnam, the Philippines, Nepal, Taiwan, and the United States each having more than 20,000 nationals living there as citizens. Since the COVID-19 pandemic ended, Tokyo's foreign population has increased significantly, now nearly 20% above the January 2022 population of 546,436. There is no official survey of race or place of birth as of June 2024.

=== Dialects ===
Japanese is the primary language spoken throughout the metropolis, though regional and socio-economic differences can be heard. Traditionally, dialects in Tokyo are classified into two groups: the Yamanote dialect and the Shitamachi dialect. The former has traditionally been spoken in the upper- and upper-middle-class residential area of Yamanote, which includes Bancho, Kojimachi, Koishikawa, Kudan, Yotsuya, Azabu, and Akasaka. During the Edo period, these neighborhoods were occupied by Daimyo and other powerful samurai families, and the dialect evolved largely based on their way of speech. Standard Japanese pronunciation is largely based on this accent and spread across the country with the introduction of radio. The Shitamachi dialect, in contrast, has been associated with the Chōnin district of Shitamachi and retains many characteristics of the accents spoken there in the Edo era. However, socio-economic changes in the post-war period and the large influx of people moving from other areas have largely blurred these distinctions in recent years. It has been reported that young generations are not as aware of the differences in dialects as their parents' and grandparents' generations were.

The Hachijō dialect, spoken primarily in Hachijōjima and Aogashima, descended from 6th-8th century Eastern Old Japanese and has fewer than 1,000 speakers. Bonin English is a creole spoken in the Ogasawara Islands, derived from English and Japanese, as the islands' population historically consisted of people of Japanese, British, American, Hawaiian, and Polynesian origins, mostly mixed-race.

== Economy ==
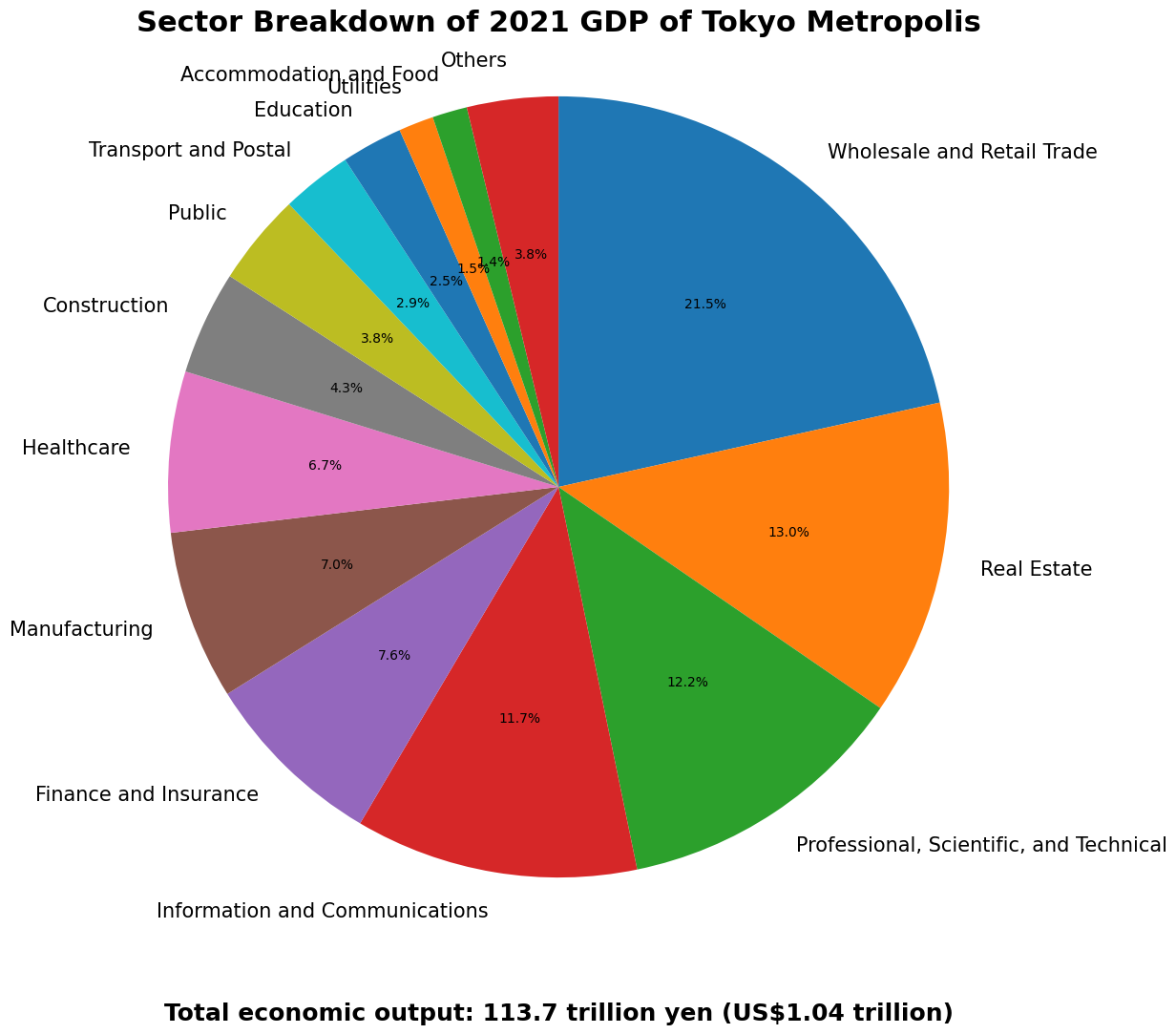
Sector breakdown of the 2021 GDP of Tokyo

Tokyo's gross regional product was 120.2 trillion yen or US$887.9 billion in FY2022 and accounted for 21.2% of the country's total economic output, which converts to 8.43 million yen or US$62,291 per capita. By sector, wholesale and retail was the largest contributor, accounting for 21.5% of the total output. This was followed by real estate (13.5%), professional, scientific and technical (12.2%), information and communications (11.7%), finance and insurance (7.6%), manufacturing (7.0%), and healthcare (6.7%). Agriculture, forestry and fishery, and mining combined accounted for less than 0.1% of the economic output. As these numbers suggest, Tokyo's economy is heavily dependent on the tertiary sector. As the Greater Tokyo Area, it has the second-largest metropolitan economy in the world, after Greater New York, with a gross metropolitan product estimated at US$2 trillion. The area's economy is slightly smaller than Canada's economy while being slightly larger than Mexico's, according to IMF estimates from the same year.

Tokyo's business districts are concentrated in four central wards: Chiyoda (Marunouchi, Otemachi, Kasumigaseki), Chuo (Nihombashi, Kyobashi, Yaesu), Minato (Shimbashi, Shiodome, Toranomon), and Shinjuku (West Shinjuku). The 23 Special Wards of Tokyo had 73.5 million m^{2} of office space as of January 2022.

In 2025, 26 of the Fortune Global 500 companies were headquartered in Tokyo. Notably, around 20 of them are based in Marunouchi, such as MUFG, Mitsubishi Corp. and Hitachi. Tokyo was rated by the Economist Intelligence Unit as the most expensive (highest cost-of-living) city in the world for 14 years in a row ending in 2006, when it was replaced by Oslo, and later Paris. However, years of deflation and an extremely weak yen starting in 2022 due to Japan's low interest rates made the cost of living in Tokyo 31% cheaper than in New York City in 2023, which is roughly the same as in Beijing and Manchester according to the 2023 EIU rankings.

=== Finance ===
Tokyo is a major international finance center, housing the headquarters of several of the world's largest investment banks and insurance companies, and serves as a hub for Japan's transportation, publishing, electronics, and broadcasting industries. During the centralized growth of Japan's economy following World War II, many large firms moved their headquarters from cities such as Osaka (the historical commercial capital) to Tokyo, in an attempt to take advantage of better access to the government.

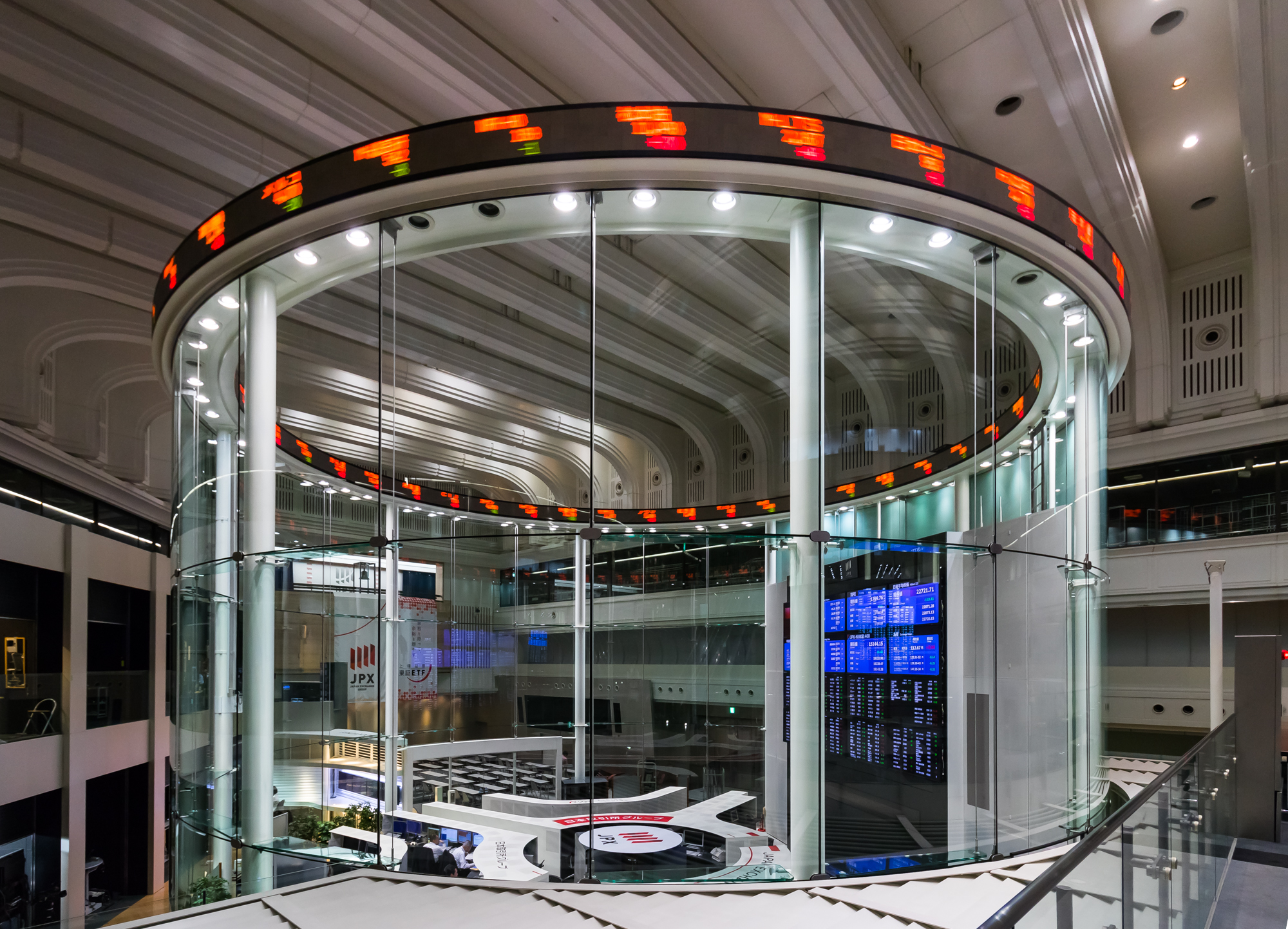
The Tokyo Stock Exchange, Chuo, Tokyo

Tokyo emerged as a leading international financial center (IFC) in the 1960s and has been described as one of the three "command centers" for the world economy, along with New York City and London. In the 2020 Global Financial Centers Index, Tokyo was ranked as having the fourth most competitive financial center in the world, and second most competitive in Asia (after Shanghai). Mitsubishi UFJ, Sumitomo-Mitsui Banking Corporation, Mizuho Financial Group, all among the top 20 banks in the world by total assets in 2023, are headquartered in Tokyo.

The Japanese financial market opened up slowly in 1984 and accelerated its internationalization with the "Japanese Big Bang" in 1998. Despite the emergence of Singapore and Hong Kong as competing financial centers, the Tokyo IFC manages to keep a prominent position in Asia. The Tokyo Stock Exchange is Japan's largest stock exchange, and third largest in the world by market capitalization, and the fourth largest by share turnover. In 1990, at the end of the Japanese asset price bubble, it accounted for more than 60% of the world stock market value.

=== Media and communications ===
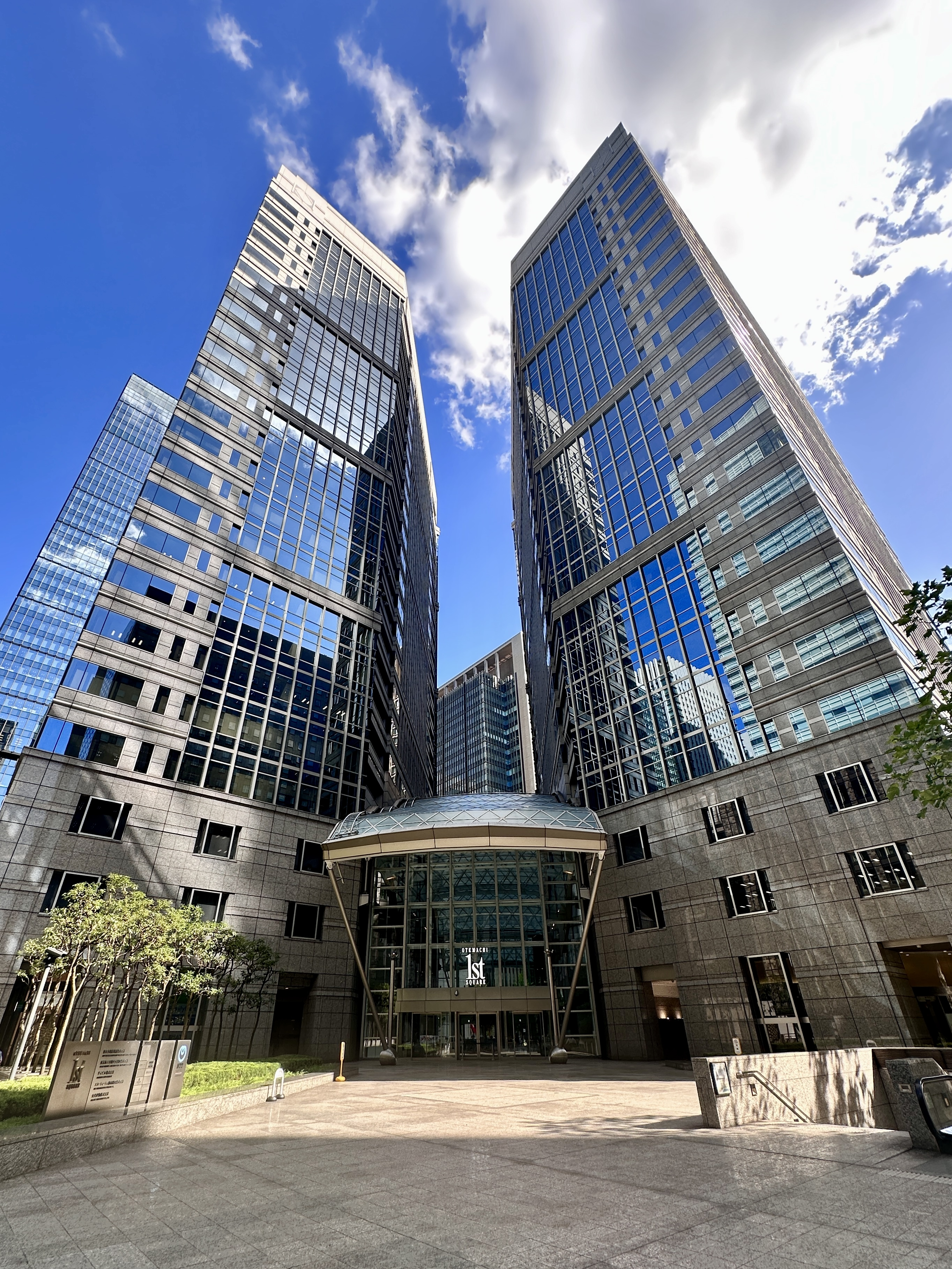
Otemachi 1st Square, headquarters of NTT

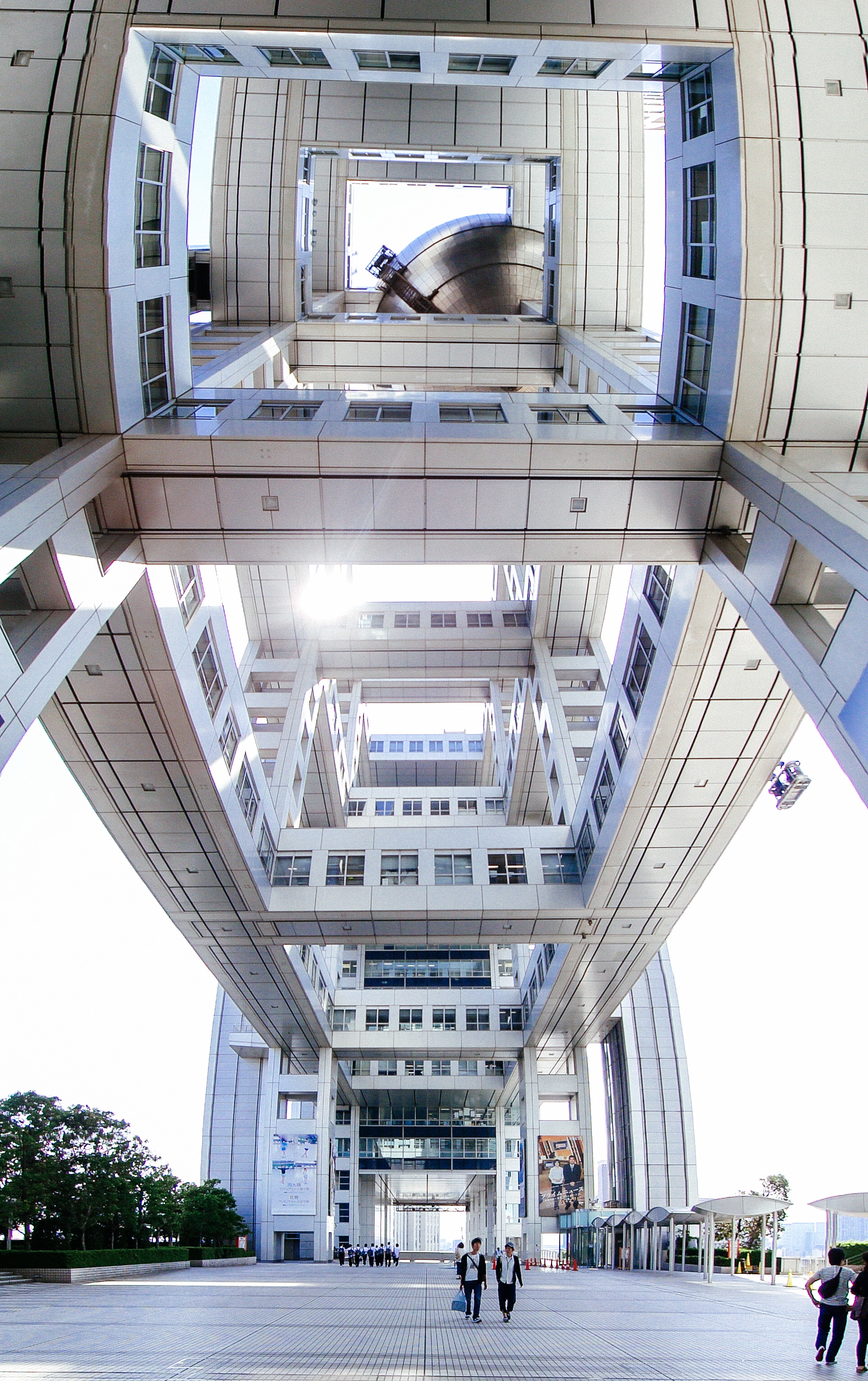
Fuji Broadcasting Center, headquarters of Fuji Television

Tokyo's position as the country's cultural, political, and economic hub has made its media industry the largest in Japan. A majority of national media companies are headquartered in Tokyo, as well as the Asian or Japanese branches of international media companies. The NHK, the oldest and only nationwide public broadcaster in the country, is headquartered in Shibuya. Other national broadcasters, such as TBS, Nippon Television, Fuji Television, and TV Asahi, are also based in Tokyo. Of the five major national newspapers, The Nikkei, The Mainichi, and The Yomiuri are headquartered in Tokyo, while the other two, The Asahi and The Sankei, maintain head offices both in Tokyo and Osaka. Major publishers based in Tokyo include Shueisha, Kodansha, Kadokawa, Shogakukan, Bungeishunju, Shinchosha, and Iwanami Shoten, with a high concentration in Chiyoda and Shinjuku.

Dentsu, Hakuhodo, and ADK Holdings, all based in Tokyo, are the country's largest advertising agencies. All three major telecommunications companies in Japan, namely NTT (whose market capitalization was once the largest among all publicly traded companies in the world), KDDI, and SoftBank, are based in Tokyo. Tokyo is also a major hub for anime production, with major anime studios such as Studio Ghibli, Madhouse, A-1 Pictures, MAPPA, Wit Studio, Toei, and Shaft based particularly in the west of the metropolis.

=== Tourism ===
In 2019, tourism accounted for slightly more than one percent of Tokyo's total economic output, with 15.18 million foreign visitors spending 1.26 trillion yen, according to the Tokyo Metropolitan Government.

According to a 2022 government survey, the most visited areas in Tokyo were:

- Shibuya: Shibuya Crossing, Yoyogi Park, Hachiko statue
- Shinjuku: Kabukichō, Shinjuku Gyo-en
- Ginza: Shopping district, Kabukiza
- Marunouchi/Nihonbashi: Imperial Palace, Shopping district (Mitsukoshi, Takashimaya)
- Asakusa: Sensō-ji, Tokyo Skytree
- Akihabara: electronics and anime culture
- Ueno: Tokyo National Museum, National Museum of Nature and Science, Ueno Zoo, Ueno Park
- Harajuku/Omotesandō: Meiji Shrine, Takeshita dori
- Roppongi: Roppongi Hills, Azabudai Hills, National Art Center Tokyo, Suntory Museum of Art, Mori Art Museum
- Ikebukuro: Shopping district

Luxury hotels in Tokyo include the Imperial Hotel (opened in 1890), Hotel Chinzanso Tokyo (opened in 1992), Hotel Okura Tokyo (opened in 1962), Meguro Gajoen Hotel, Conrad Tokyo, the Ritz-Carlton Tokyo and Aman Tokyo.

=== Agriculture, fishery, and forestry ===
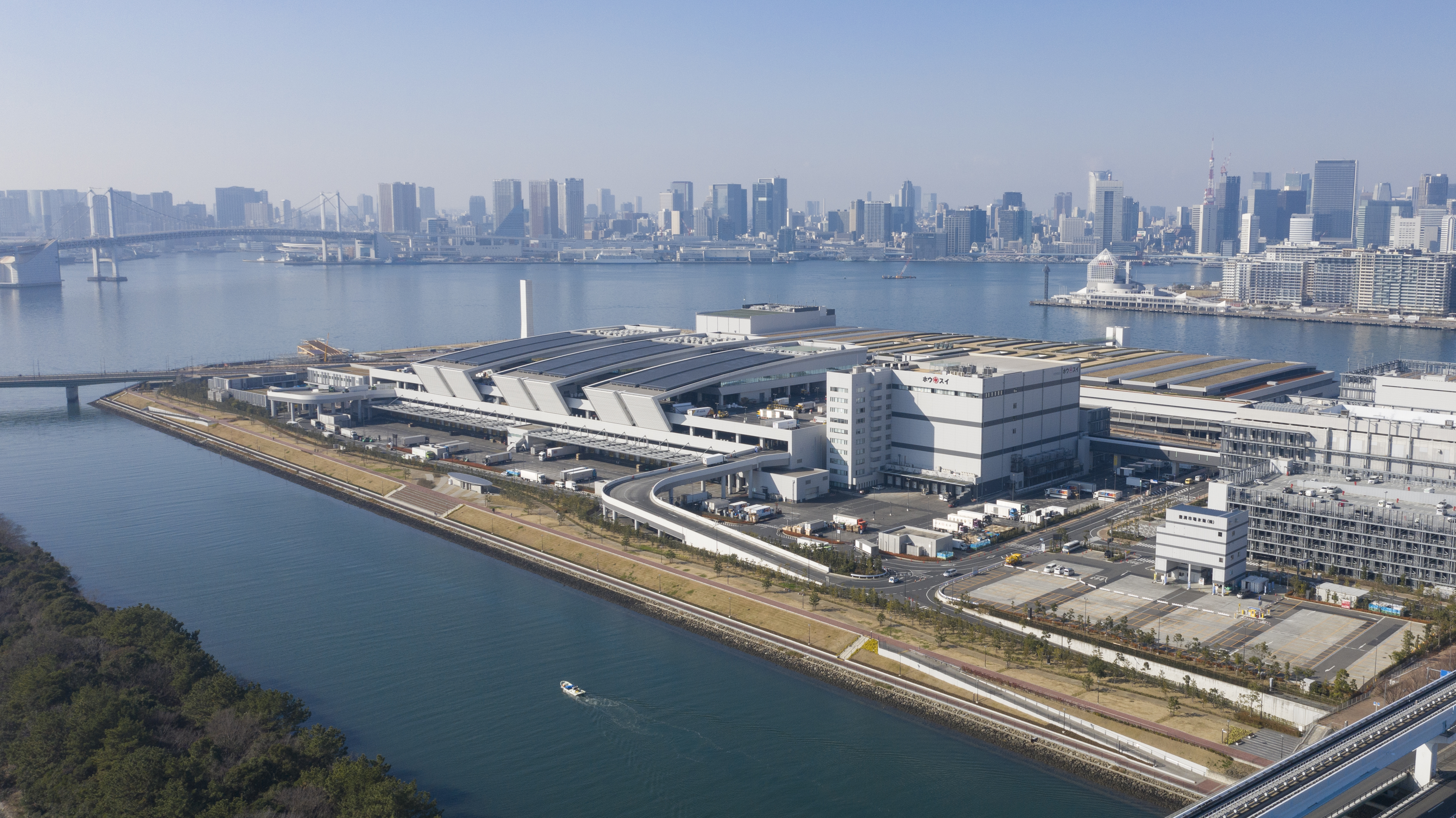
Toyosu Market, Koto

The Toyosu Market in Tokyo is the largest wholesale fish and seafood market in the world since it opened on October 11, 2018. It is also one of the largest wholesale food markets of any kind. It is located in the Toyosu area of Kōtō ward. The Toyosu Market holds strong to the traditions of its predecessor, the Tsukiji Fish Market and Nihonbashi fish market, and serves some 50,000 buyers and sellers every day. Retailers, wholesalers, auctioneers, and public citizens alike frequent the market, creating a unique microcosm of organized chaos that continues to fuel the city and its food supply after over four centuries. Tokyo had 8,460 hectares (20,900 acres) of agricultural land as of 2003, according to the Ministry of Agriculture, Forestry and Fisheries, placing it last among the nation's prefectures. The farmland is concentrated in Western Tokyo. Perishables such as vegetables, fruits, and flowers can be conveniently shipped to the markets in the eastern part of the prefecture.

With 36% of its area covered by forest, Tokyo has extensive growths of cryptomeria and Japanese cypress, especially in the mountainous western communities of Akiruno, Ōme, Okutama, Hachiōji, Hinode, and Hinohara. Decreases in the price of timber, increases in the cost of production, and advancing old age among the forestry population have resulted in a decline in Tokyo's output. In addition, pollen, especially from cryptomeria, is a major allergen for the nearby population centers. Tokyo Bay was once a major source of fish. Most of Tokyo's fish production comes from the outer islands, such as Izu Ōshima and Hachijō-Jima. Skipjack tuna, nori, and aji are among the ocean products.

== Transportation ==
Tokyo, which is the center of the Greater Tokyo Area, is Japan's largest domestic and international hub for rail and ground transportation. Public transportation within Tokyo is dominated by an extensive network of "clean and efficient" trains and subways run by a variety of operators, with buses, monorails and trams playing a secondary feeder role. There are up to 62 electric train lines and more than 900 train stations in Tokyo. Shibuya Crossing is the "world's busiest pedestrian crossing", with around 3,000 people crossing at a time.

=== Rail ===
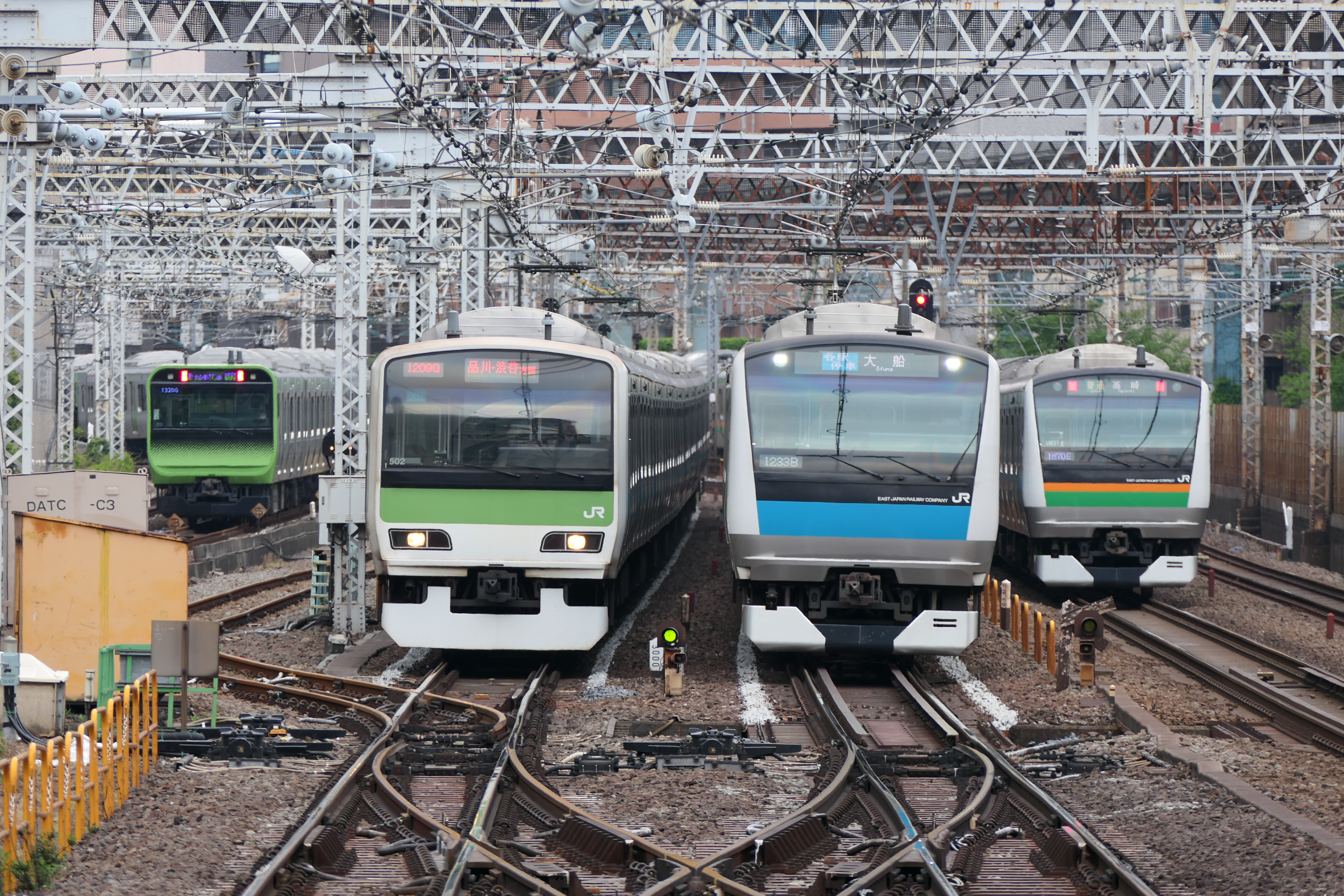
JR East operates the largest commuter train network in Tokyo as well as intercity services.

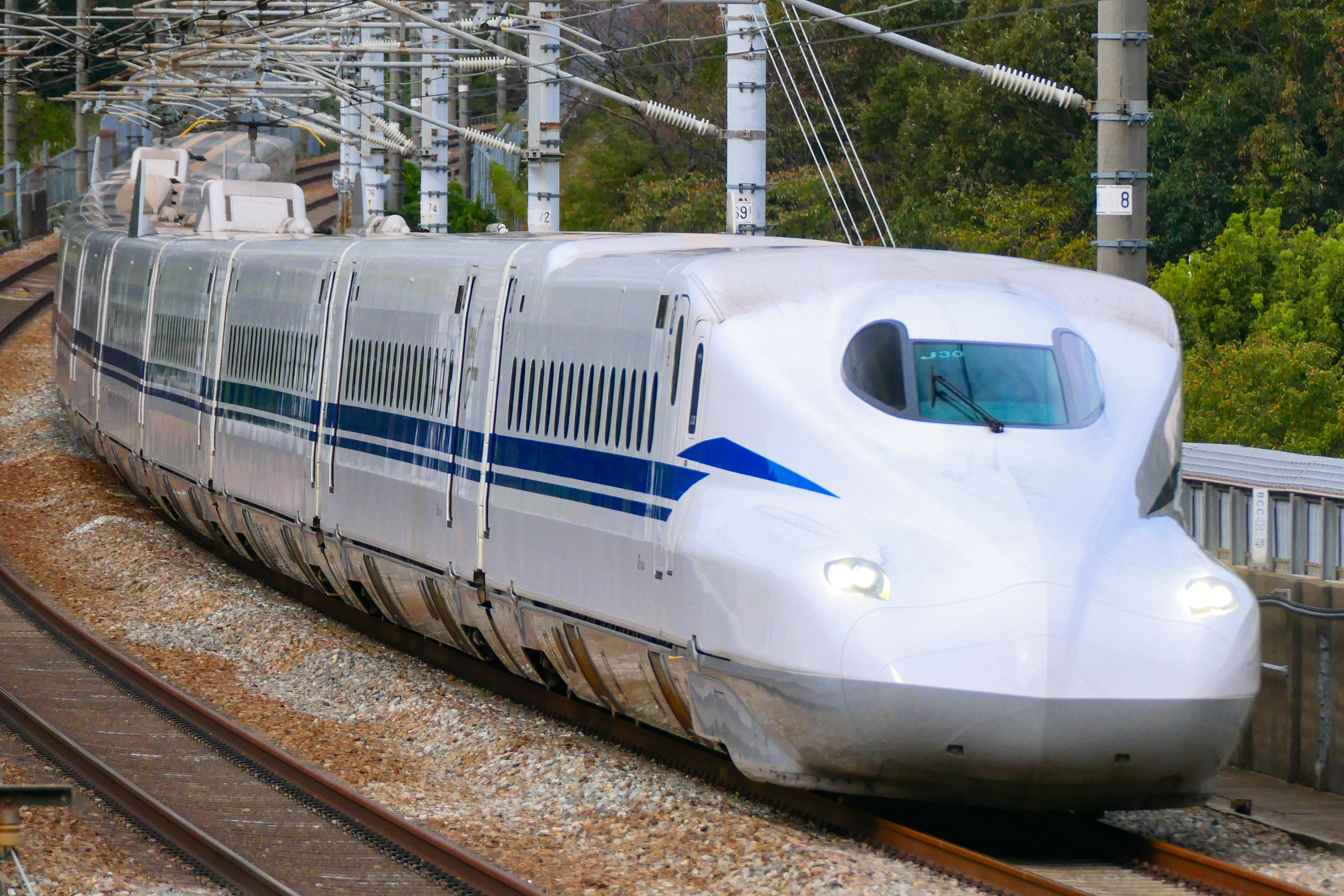
The Shinkansen connects major cities around the country to Tokyo.

Rail is the primary mode of transportation in Tokyo, which has the most extensive urban railway network in the world and an equally extensive network of surface lines. JR East operates Tokyo's largest railway network, including the Yamanote Line loop that circles central Tokyo. It operates rail lines throughout the entire metropolitan area of Tokyo and the rest of northeastern Honshu. JR East is also responsible for the Shinkansen high-speed rail lines that link Tokyo and the Northeastern cities of Japan (Joetsu Shinkansen, Tohoku/Hokkaido Shinkansen, Yamagata Shinkansen, Akita Shinkansen, Hokuriku Shinkansen). The Tokaido Shinkansen, which links Tokyo and Osaka via Nagoya and Kyoto, as well as western cities beyond, is operated by JR Central. The Chuo Shinkansen, the first-ever long-distance high-speed floating maglev line currently under construction, will also be operated by JR Central. Both JR companies were created from the privatization of Japan National Railways in 1987. JR Freight does not own any part of the railway network but operates freight trains on the JR network. Two different entities operate Tokyo's underground railway network: the privatized Tokyo Metro, which operates Tokyo Metro lines, and the governmental Tokyo Metropolitan Bureau of Transportation, which operates Toei lines. Tokyo Metro is a listed private company, although the Japanese Government and the Tokyo Metropolitan Government still jointly hold a 50% stake due to its history as a public entity called the Imperial Capital Rapid Transit Authority from 1941 to 2004. Other major railway operators in Tokyo include Odakyu, Tokyu, Keio, Seibu, Tobu, and Keisei. Although each operator directly owns its railway lines, services that travel across different lines owned by different operators are common.

Tokyo once had an extensive tram network, with a total distance of 213 km (Tokyo Toden). However, similar to other major cities worldwide, the age of motorization since the 1950s has made it considered unfit to share busy roads with cars. Today, only one line, the Arakawa line, remains.

=== Roads ===
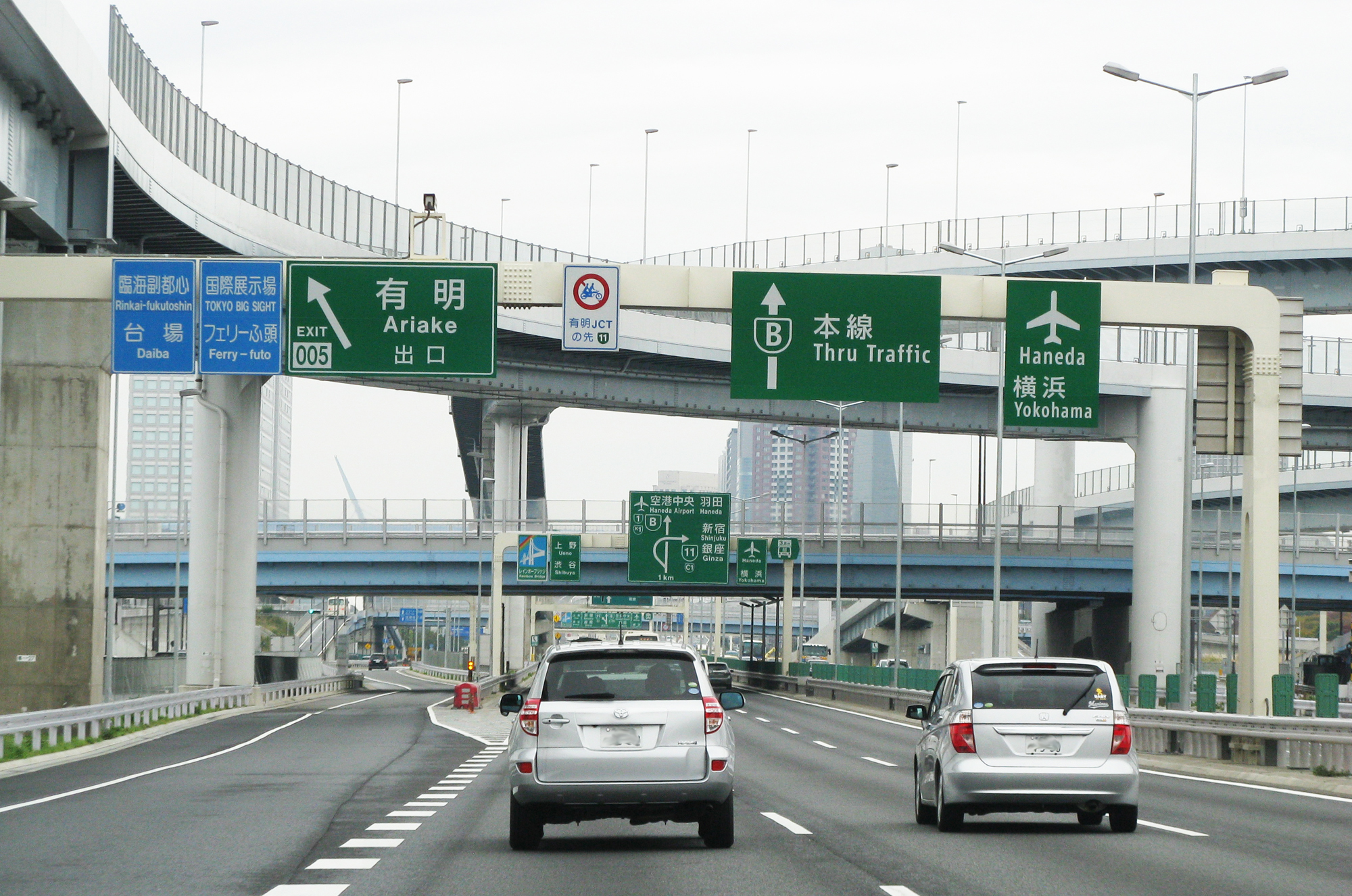
Shuto Expressway near Harumi

Tokyo has the lowest car ownership rate among all prefectures in Japan, with 0.416 cars per household compared to the national average of 1.025 per household. This is despite Tokyo being one of the most affluent areas in the country. A 2021 survey found that 81% of respondents without a car were satisfied with public transport and saw no need to own one.

Each road in Tokyo falls into one of the following categories depending on the type of ownership: private roads, municipal roads, metropolitan roads, and expressways. As of April 1, 2022, the total length of roads in Tokyo is approximately 24,741 km (including 2,370 km of metropolitan roads), with a total area of approximately 190.31 km^{2} (including 46.30 km^{2} of metropolitan roads). Intercity expressways in and around Tokyo are managed by NEXCO East, while expressways that serve only within the Greater Tokyo Area (Shuto Expressway) are operated by the Metropolitan Expressway Company. Tolls are collected based on the distance travelled. The total length of the Shuto Expressway is 337.8 km, with speed limits usually set at 80 km/h or 60 km/h to reduce noise pollution and accommodate the relatively winding road shapes.

=== Aviation ===
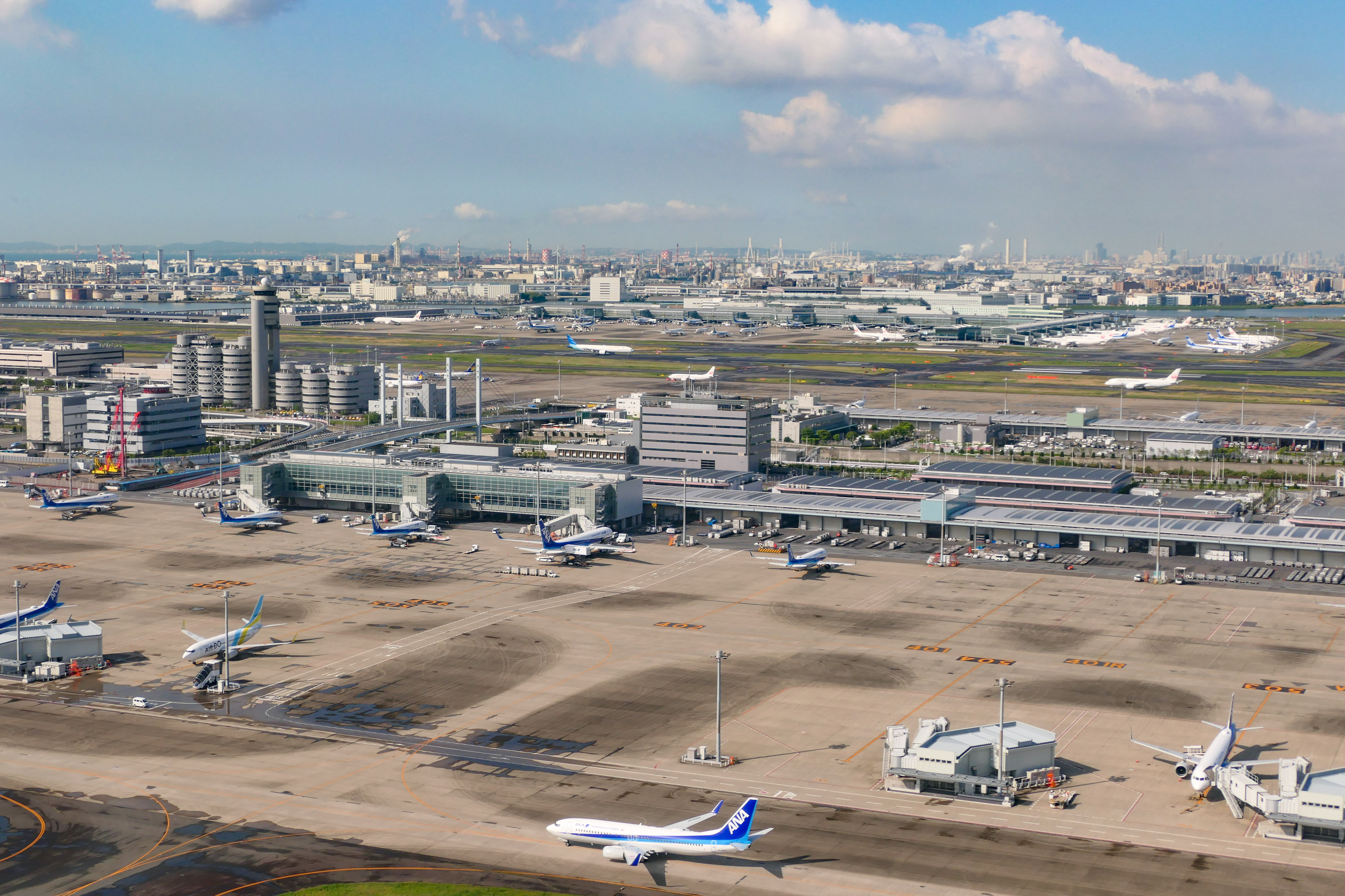
Aerial view of Haneda Airport

The mainland portion of Tokyo is served by two international airports: Haneda Airport in Ōta and Narita International Airport in neighboring Chiba Prefecture. Haneda has served as the primary airport for Tokyo since 1931. However, the Jet Age saw an exponential increase in flights, prompting the government to build a second airport. Narita was chosen as the site for this second airport in 1966, but local farmers and left-wing activists who sympathized with them protested vehemently for more than a decade (the Sanrizuka Struggle), delaying the new airport's opening until 1978. Almost all international flights were transferred to Narita Airport upon its completion, and Haneda became primarily a domestic airport.

The situation changed when it was decided to expand Haneda Airport and build new runways in 2001. The new runway, Runway D, was constructed partly as a pier-like structure rather than a landfilled structure to avoid obstructing the flow of water in the bay. Its opening in 2010 marked the return of international flights to Haneda, which is much closer to central Tokyo. In 2023, Haneda handled 17.9 million international passengers and 60.8 million domestic passengers, while Narita was used by 25.4 million international passengers and 7.7 million domestic passengers. According to a 2023 survey, Haneda is the fifth busiest airport in the world by passenger traffic.

Hachijō-jima (Hachijojima Airport), Kōzu-shima (Kōzushima Airport), Miyakejima (Miyakejima Airport), Nii-jima (Niijima Airport), and Izu Ōshima (Oshima Airport), located on the Izu Islands, which are governed by the Tokyo Metropolis have services to Haneda and the Chōfu Airport located in Chōfu.

=== Water transport ===
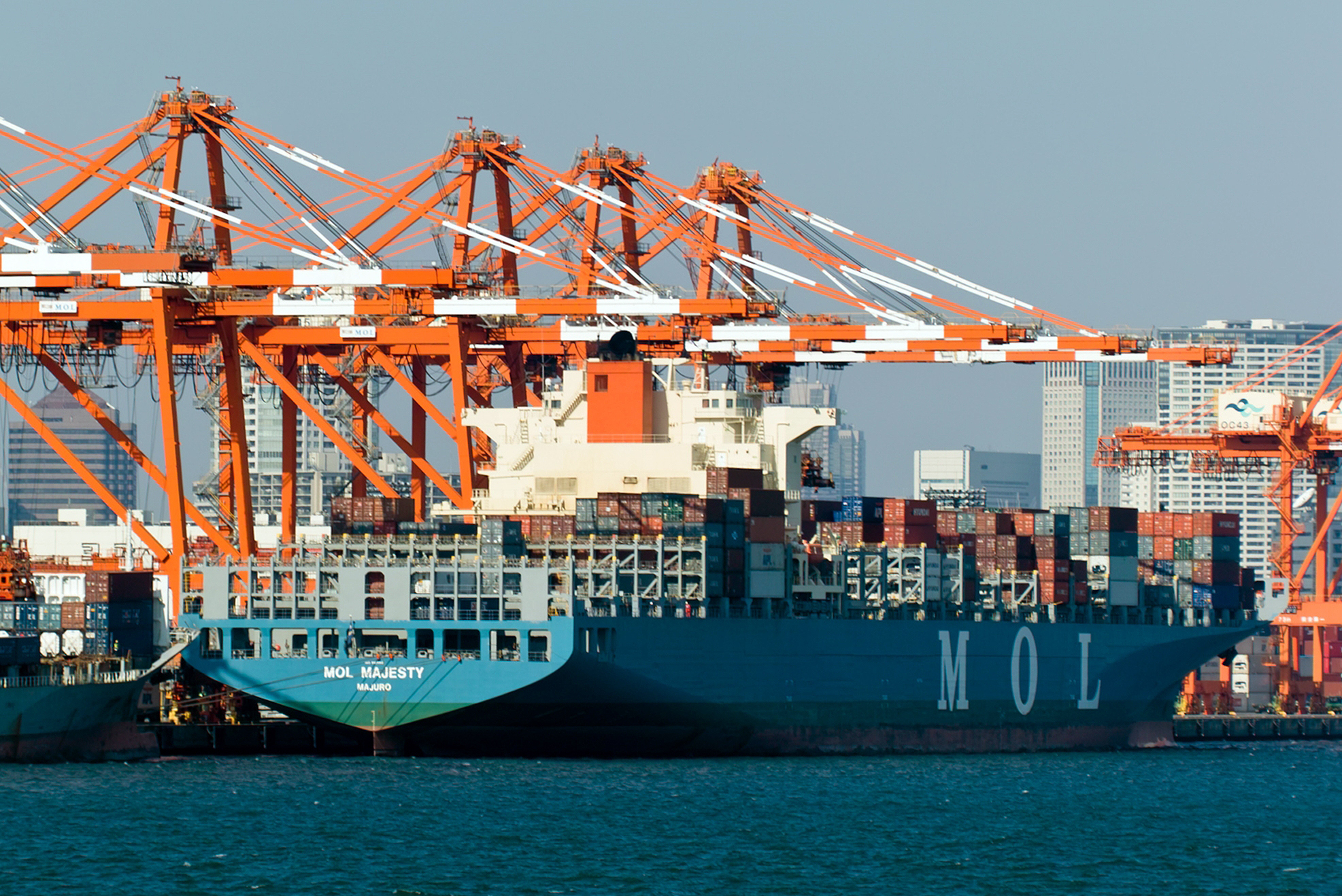
A Mitsui O.S.K. Lines container ship at the Port of Tokyo

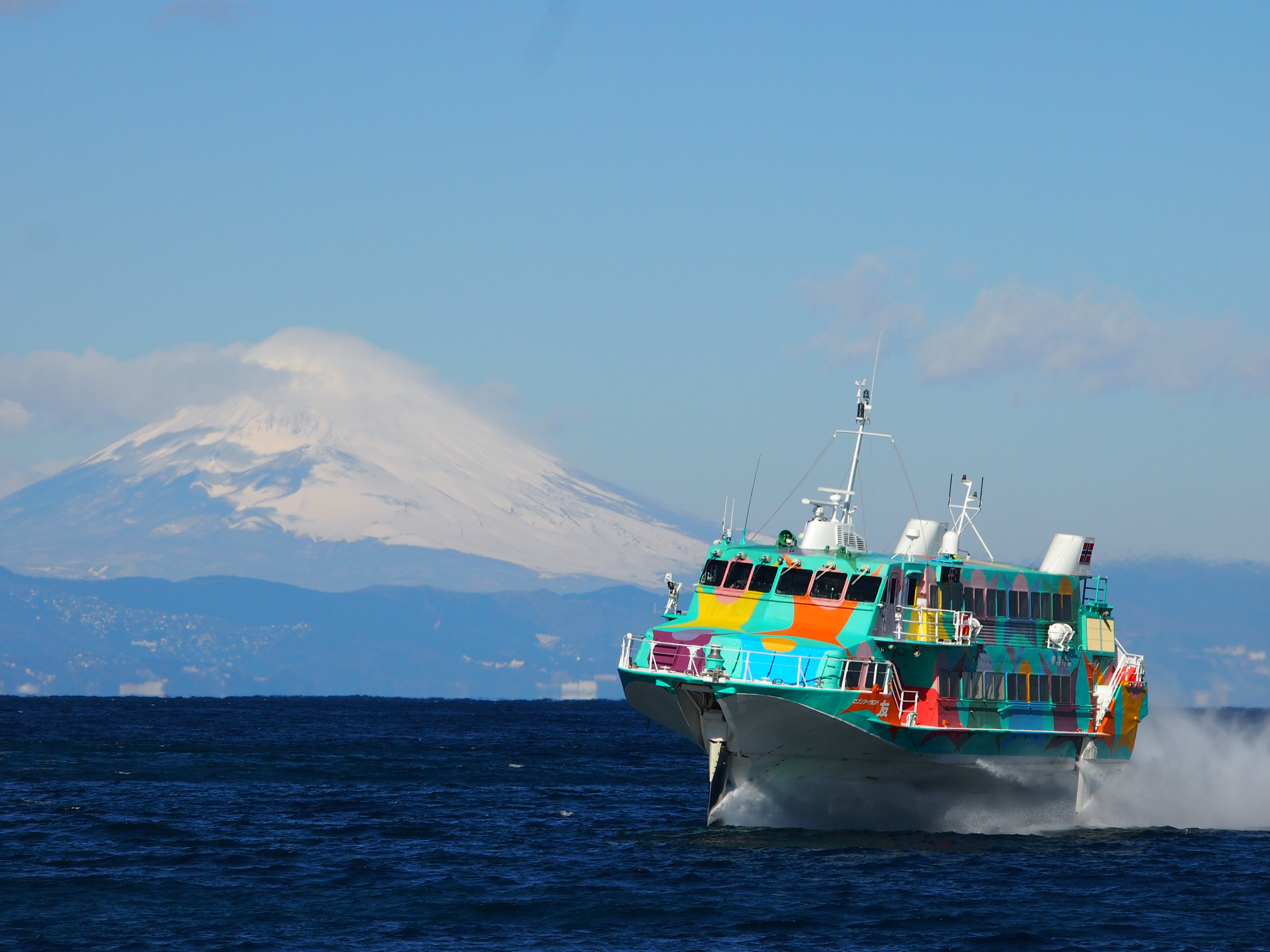
A Jetfoil operated by the Tōkai Kisen, which serves between Tokyo and the Izu Islands

Water transport is the primary means of importing and exporting goods as well as connecting the Tokyo Islands to the mainland. According to Lloyd's List, the Port of Tokyo handled 4,430,000 TEU of containers in 2022, making it the 46th largest port in the world. The Greater Tokyo Area is served by other major ports such as the Port of Yokohama and the Port of Chiba as well. Takeshiba Pier (竹芝埠頭) in Minato is used by Tōkai Kisen, which serves islands such as Izu Ōshima, Miyakejima, Hachijojima, Kozushima, and Ogasawara Kaiun, which serves the Ogasawara Islands. Many of these islands are accessible only by ocean routes and helicopters, as they are too small or undulating for a landing ground, making these ships the primary means of inter-island transport. There are ferry routes that connect landmarks within the mainland portion of Tokyo as well; the Tokyo Cruise Ship and the Tokyo Mizube Line operate several routes between tourist attractions such as Asakusa, Hamarikyu, Odaiba, and Shinagawa Aquarium. The Symphony Cruise operates two large restaurant ships that can also be hired as party venues.

== Education ==
Tokyo is the educational, academic, and cultural hub of Japan. From primary to tertiary levels, numerous educational institutions operate in the city to cater to a diverse range of pupils and students.

=== Tertiary education ===
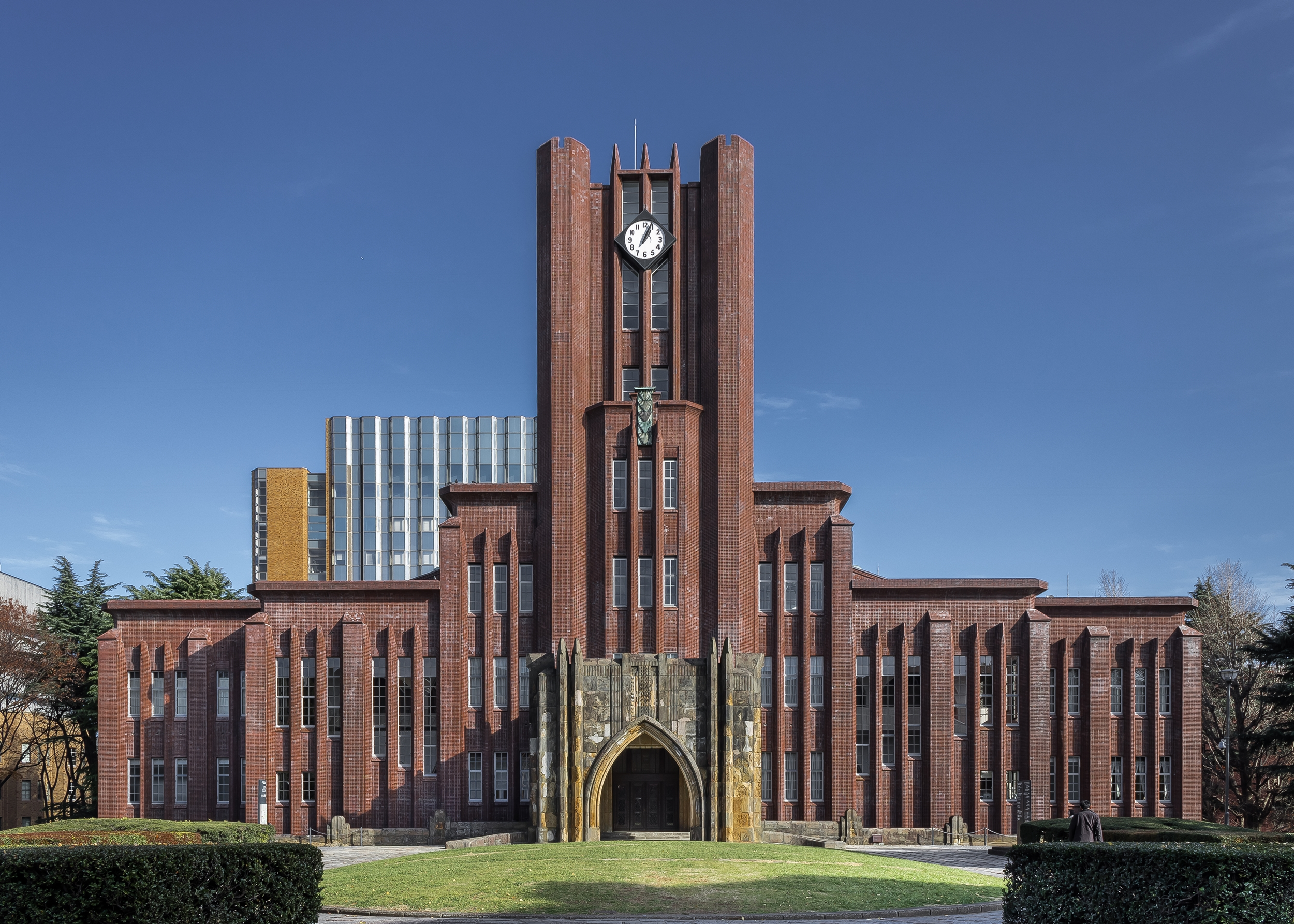
Yasuda Auditorium, University of Tokyo, Bunkyō

Tokyo is the heartland of tertiary education in the country, home to 143 authorized universities in 2020. This number includes the nation's most prestigious and selective universities, such as, the University of Tokyo (QS National:1st), Tokyo Institute of Technology (4th), Waseda University (9th), Keio University (10th) and Hitotsubashi University (15th). Additionally, Tokyo University of the Arts is widely regarded as the most prestigious painting, sculpture, crafts, and music school in the country. The United Nations University, which is the academic arm of the United Nations, is headquartered in Shibuya, Tokyo. In 2024, QS Best Student Cities ranked Tokyo as the second-best city for university students, after London. The ranking noted that Tokyo is ideal for "those who favour total immersion in local culture rather than living in a "student bubble'", stating that despite having high-ranking universities and large global companies offering internships as well as rich culture, Tokyo still has a very low international student population ratio.

=== Primary and secondary education ===
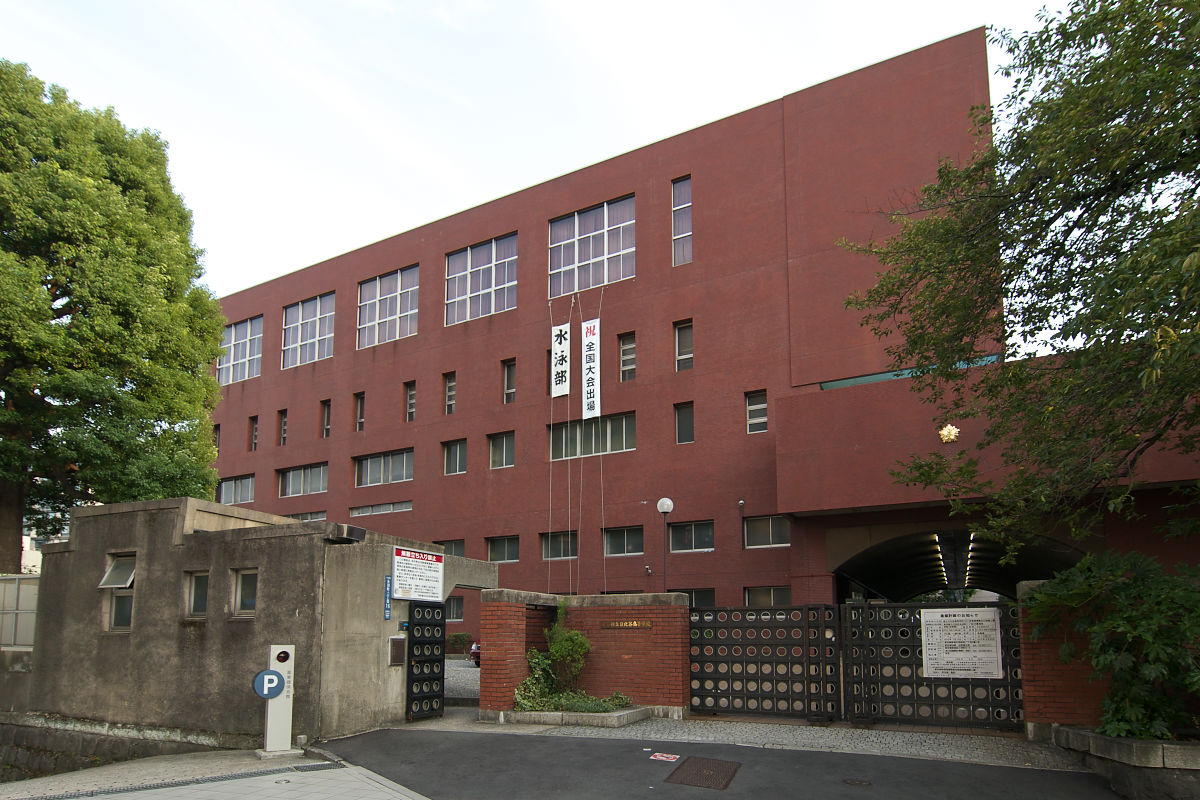
Hibiya High School, Chiyoda

At the secondary level, 429 senior high schools are located in Tokyo, six of which are national, 186 are public, and 237 are private. Some senior high schools, often prestigious national or private ones, run jointly with their affiliated junior high schools, providing six-year educational programs (Chūkō Ikkan Kyōiku). The Kaisei Academy, Komaba Junior & Senior High School, University of Tsukuba, Azabu High School, and Oin Junior and Senior High School, the largest sources of successful applicants to the nation's top university, the University of Tokyo, are some examples of such. At the primary level, there are 1332 elementary schools in Tokyo. Six of them are national, 1261 are public, and 53 are private.

Early-modern-established academies such as Gakushuin and Keio provide all-through educational programs from primary schools to universities, originally to cater to the needs of traditionally affluent and powerful families. There are international and ethnic schools that abide by the national curricula of their respective countries or international curricula rather than the Japanese one as well, such as the British School in Tokyo, Tokyo Chinese School, the American School in Japan, and the Tokyo International School.

=== Learned societies ===
Almost all major Japanese learned societies are based in Tokyo. The Japan Academy, the country's academy of sciences, was established in 1879 to bring together leading scholars in various disciplines. The Japan Art Academy was established in 1919 with a similar purpose. These two national academies are headquartered in Ueno Park. The newest national academy, the Science Council of Japan, was established in 1949 to promote scientific research and the application of research findings to civilian life. It is located in Roppongi, Minato.

== Culture ==
=== Museums, art galleries, libraries, and zoos ===
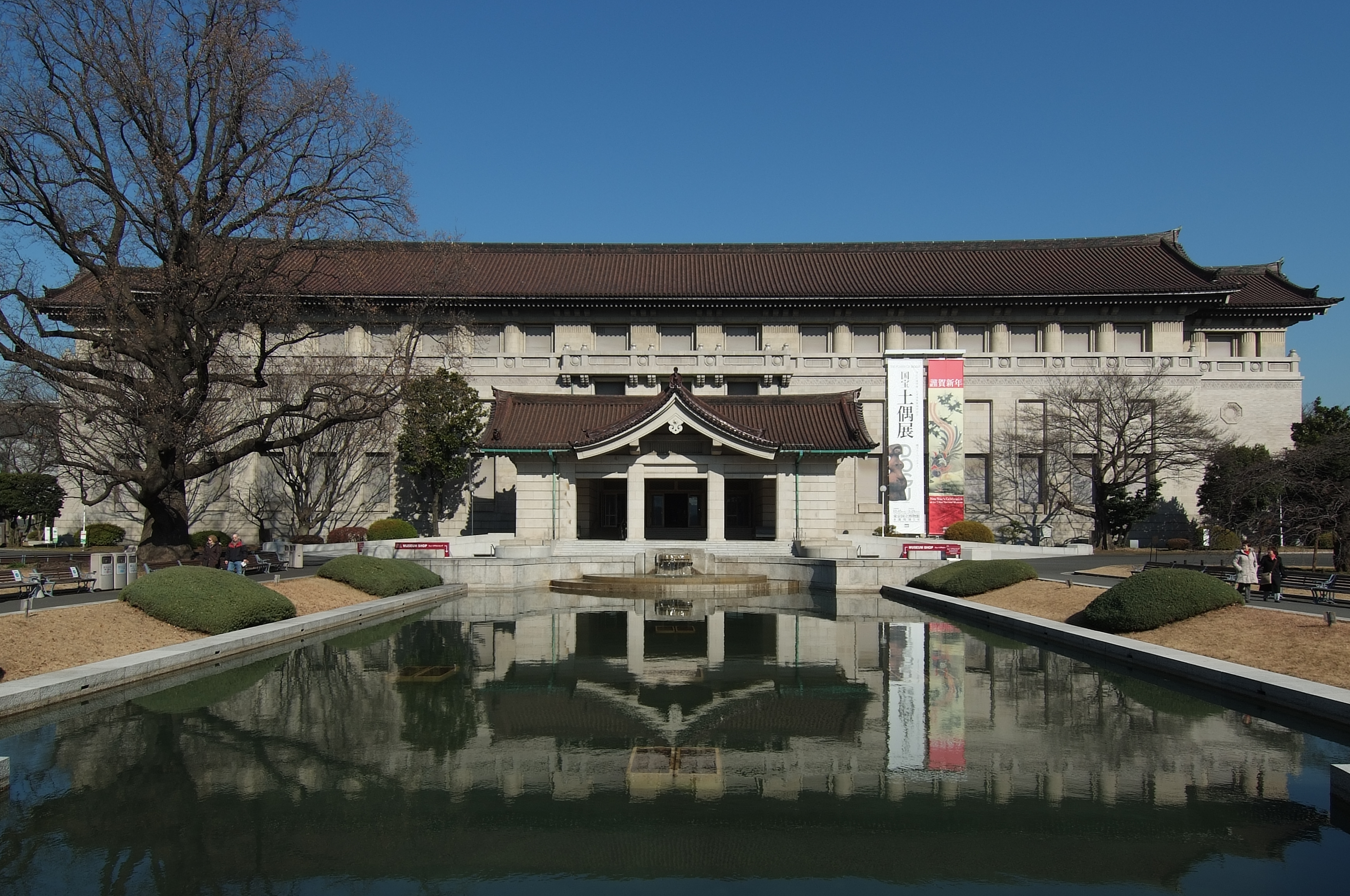
Tokyo National Museum, Ueno

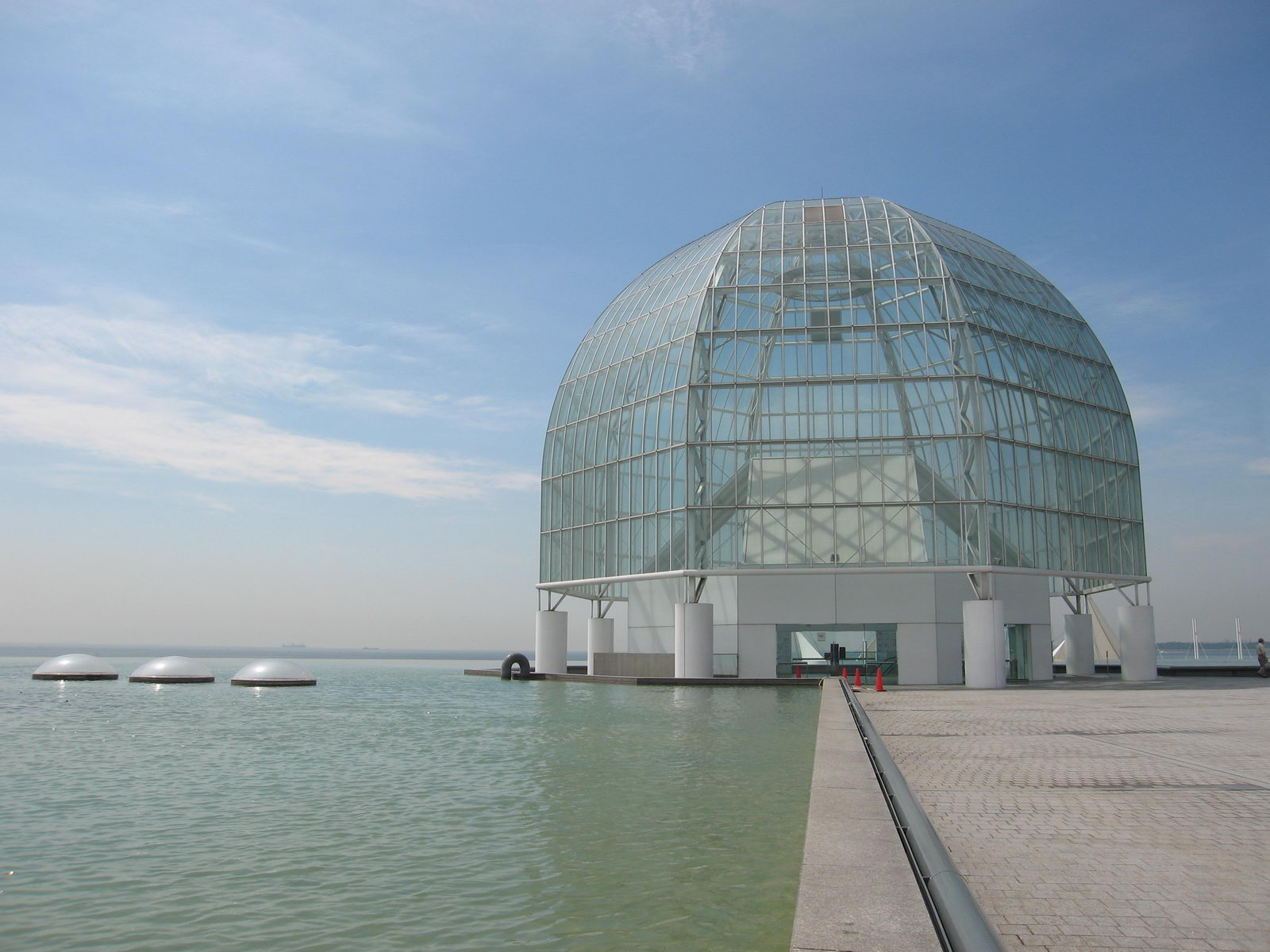
Tokyo Sea Life Park, Edogawa

Tokyo is home to a wide array of museums, art galleries, and libraries, catering to various interests. Ueno Park has the Tokyo National Museum, the country's largest museum specializing in traditional Japanese art, the National Museum of Western Art, whose building designed by Le Corbusier is a world heritage site, and the National Museum of Nature and Science. Ueno Zoo is also located within the park, near the Shinobazu Pond. It is famous for being one of the three zoos in Japan to have giant pandas, with a population of 4 as of May 2024.

Other notable museums include the Artizon Museum in Chūō, the National Museum of Emerging Science and Innovation in Odaiba, and the Edo-Tokyo Museum in Sumida, which provides insights into the history and culture of Tokyo. The Edo-Tokyo Open Air Architectural Museum preserves various buildings that have existed throughout the history of Tokyo. The Nezu Museum in Aoyama has a collection of pre-modern Japanese and East Asian art. Located near the Imperial Palace, the National Diet Library, the National Archives, and the National Museum of Modern Art are also notable cultural institutions. Additionally, the Mori Art Museum in Roppongi and the Sumida Hokusai Museum in Sumida ward are notable for their contemporary and ukiyo-e art collections, respectively. The Sompo Museum of Art in Shinjuku is best known for owning one of Van Gogh's Sunflowers. The Tokyo Metropolitan Garden Art Museum in Minato features the former Tokyo House of Yasuhiko, Prince Asaka, which was built in an opulent Art Deco style in 1933. The Railway Museum, which used to be located in Kanda, has relocated to a larger site in Omiya, Saitama and stores 42 train carriages and locomotives of historical importance. The Tobacco and Salt Museum in Sumida has one of the world's most extensive collections of different types of tobacco and salt. Major aquariums in Tokyo include: Tokyo Sea Life Park, Sunshine Aquarium and Sumida Aquarium.

=== Leisure and entertainment ===
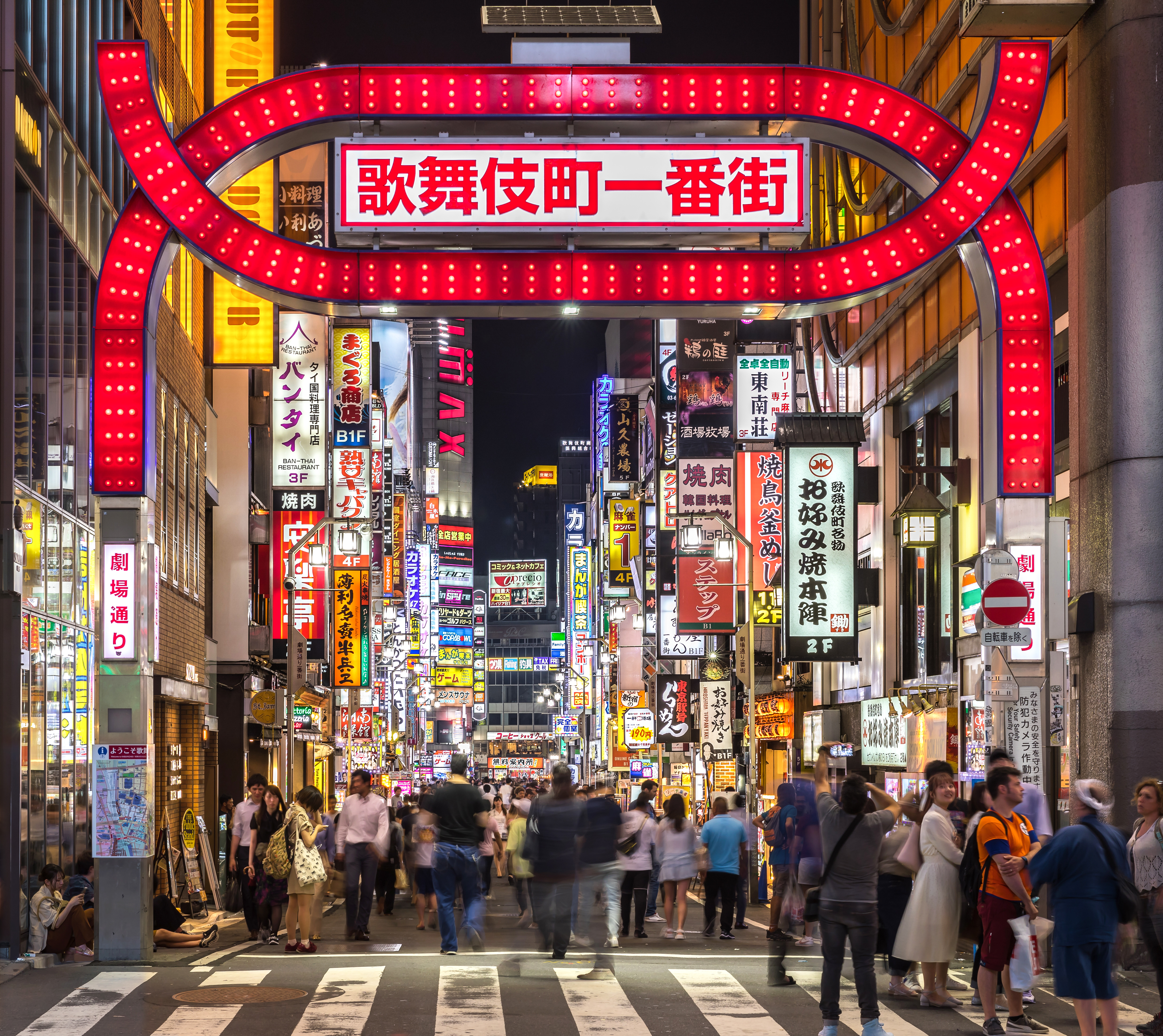
Kabukicho, a nightlife district in Shinjuku

Tokyo offers a diverse array of leisure and entertainment options. The city is home to numerous theatres. The National Noh Theatre and Kabuki-za are dedicated to traditional Japanese plays. The New National Theatre Tokyo in Shibuya serves as a central venue for opera, ballet, contemporary dance, and drama. Other major play and concert venues include: the National Theatre of Japan, the Imperial Theatre, the Meiji-za, the NHK Hall, the Tokyo Metropolitan Theatre, Tokyo Opera City and the Tokyo International Forum. Two sports venues, the Nippon Budokan and the Tokyo Dome, are usually used to host concerts by popular pop artists.

The nightlife district of Tokyo is centered around areas in the west of the city, such as Shibuya, Shinjuku, and Roppongi, with a high concentration of bars, clubs, host and hostess clubs, and live music venues. Tokyo is also known for its festivals, such as the Sannō Matsuri at Hie Shrine, the Sanja Festival at Asakusa Shrine, and the biennial Kanda Matsuri, which features parades with elaborately decorated floats. Harajuku, located in Shibuya, is internationally famous for its youth fashion and street culture, with trendy shops, cafes, and Takeshita Street. Akihabara, known as "Electric Town", is a hub for electronics and otaku culture such as anime and computer games, with numerous shops selling anime, manga, and gaming merchandise. Ginza and Nihombashi are two of Tokyo's most notable shopping districts. Ginza is known for its high-end shopping, featuring luxury brand stores, boutique shops, and department stores such as Mitsukoshi and Wako. It is also home to numerous fine dining places and art galleries, making it a cultural and commercial hub. Nihombashi, historically a center of commerce, has long-established shops and the Mitsukoshi department flagship store, Japan's first department store, founded in 1673. Jinbōchō is known for its concentration of bookstores, publishing houses, and literary cafes, and its links to a large number of famous literary figures.

Modern attractions in Tokyo include the Tokyo Skytree in Sumida, the tallest structure in Japan, which provides panoramic views of the city from its observation decks. Odaiba, a man-made island in Tokyo Bay, features shopping, dining, and entertainment attractions such as the teamLab Planets digital art museum and Joypolis indoor amusement park. The Tokyo Disney Resort and its two theme parks Tokyo Disneyland and Tokyo DisneySea are major destinations for family entertainment. Although these Disney theme parks bear the name Tokyo, they are located in nearby Urayasu, Chiba, just east of Tokyo.

=== Food ===
In November 2007, Michelin released their first guide for fine dining in Tokyo, awarding 191 stars in total, or about twice as many as Tokyo's nearest competitor, Paris. As of 2017, 227 restaurants in Tokyo have been awarded (92 in Paris). Twelve establishments were awarded the maximum of three stars (Paris has 10), 54 received two stars, and 161 earned one star.

=== Recreation ===
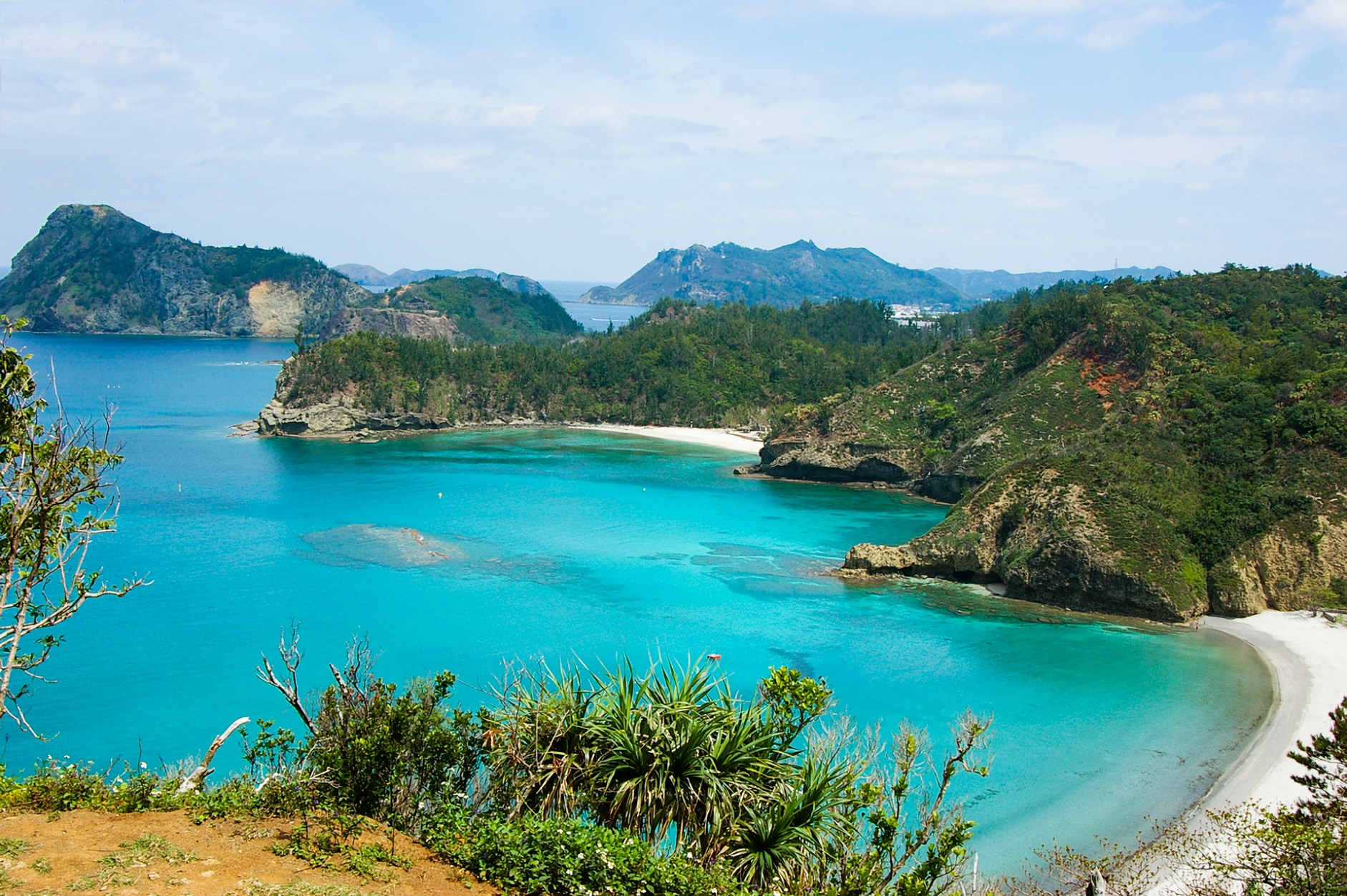
Ogasawara National Park, a UNESCO World Natural Heritage Site

Natural settings for outdoor activities include Okutama and Mount Takao, which are known for their hiking trails and scenic views. Kasai Seaside Park provides coastal leisure activities. Ueno Park houses several museums and a zoo, and is famous for its cherry blossoms. Inokashira Park in Kichijoji features a pond, a zoo, and in its vicinity the Ghibli Museum. Yoyogi Park, located near Shibuya, is popular for picnics and outdoor events. Shinjuku Gyoen National Garden, Koishikawa Korakuen Garden, Rikugien Garden, Hamarikyu Gardens, Kiyosumi Garden, Kyu Shiba Rikyu Garden, Chinzanso Garden, Happo-en Garden, Mukojima-Hyakkaen Garden and Meiji Jingu Inner Garden are popular traditional Japanese gardens in Tokyo, some of which originally belonged to members of the kazoku nobility. Botanical gardens in Tokyo include the University of Tokyo's Koishikawa Botanical Garden, the Yumenoshima Tropical Greenhouse Dome, and the Institute for Nature Study Nature Reserve.

==== National parks ====
As of March 31, 2008, 36% of the total land area of the prefecture was designated as Natural Parks (second only to Shiga Prefecture), namely the Chichibu Tama Kai, Fuji-Hakone-Izu, and Ogasawara National Park (the last a UNESCO World Heritage Site); Meiji no Mori Takao Quasi-National Park; and Akikawa Kyūryō, Hamura Kusabana Kyūryō, Sayama, Takao Jinba, Takiyama, and Tama Kyūryō Prefectural Natural Parks.

=== In popular culture ===
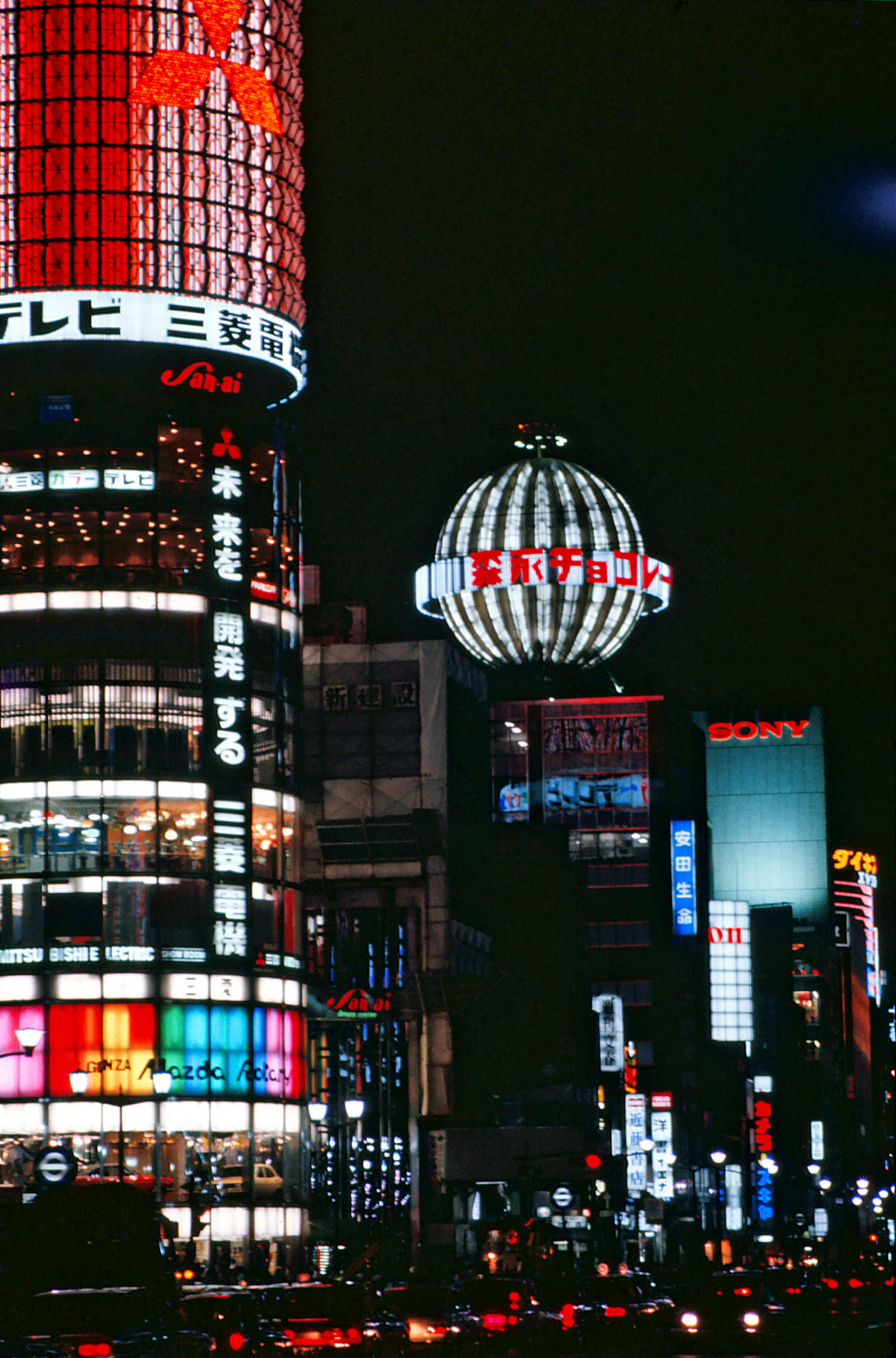
Consumer electronics stores in Tokyo in 1971: the 'city lights at night' urban landscape of Tokyo inspired the development of the cyberpunk genre.

Tokyo has long been a popular setting in both Japanese and Western creative works. In literature, the city has featured since the Edo period, while the modern city appears in the works of authors such as Natsume Sōseki and Mori Ōgai, who depicted life in Tokyo during the industrialization period in famous novels such as Sanshirō (1908) and The Wild Geese (1911). They spent their undergraduate days at Tokyo University, and many protagonists of such novels are students who moved to Tokyo for higher education, contrasting Tokyo with their hometowns. In later years, writers who have used Tokyo as the setting for their major works include: Yasunari Kawabata, who depicted the 'decadent allure' of Tokyo in the 1930s in his series The Scarlet Gang of Asakusa (1930); Kenzaburō Ōe, who centred his early works around turbulent political movements in the city in the 1960s; and Haruki Murakami, who has set many of his works in Shinjuku and Shibuya, as symbols of youth culture as well as urban loneliness. Western authors have also set their literary works in Tokyo, such as Ian Fleming's James Bond series novel You Only Live Twice and David Mitchell's number9dream.

The city has also appeared frequently in film and television. Japanese directors like Akira Kurosawa and Yasujirō Ozu have used Tokyo as the backdrop for narratives that examine postwar change and the complexities of modern society. In the kaiju (monster movie) genre, landmarks of Tokyo are usually destroyed by giant monsters such as Godzilla and Gamera. Western films, from earlier examples such as Tokyo Joe to more recent titles like Lost in Translation and The Fast and the Furious: Tokyo Drift, often depict Tokyo as an exotic urban landscape where cultures intersect. In addition, Tokyo appears frequently in anime, manga, and video games, where its real and reimagined districts provide the setting for stories ranging from realistic dramas to fantastical adventures.

== Sports ==
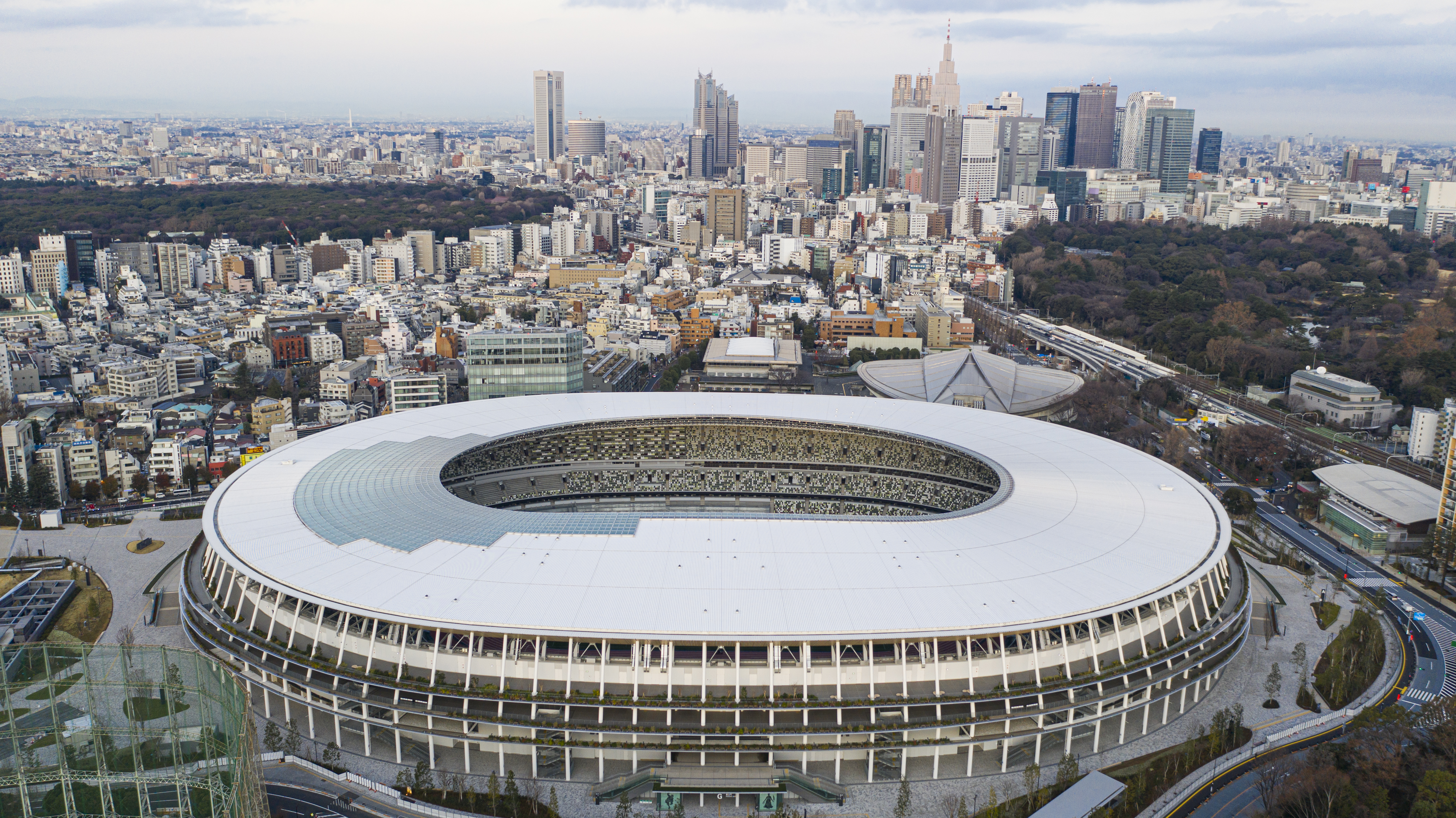
Japan National Stadium

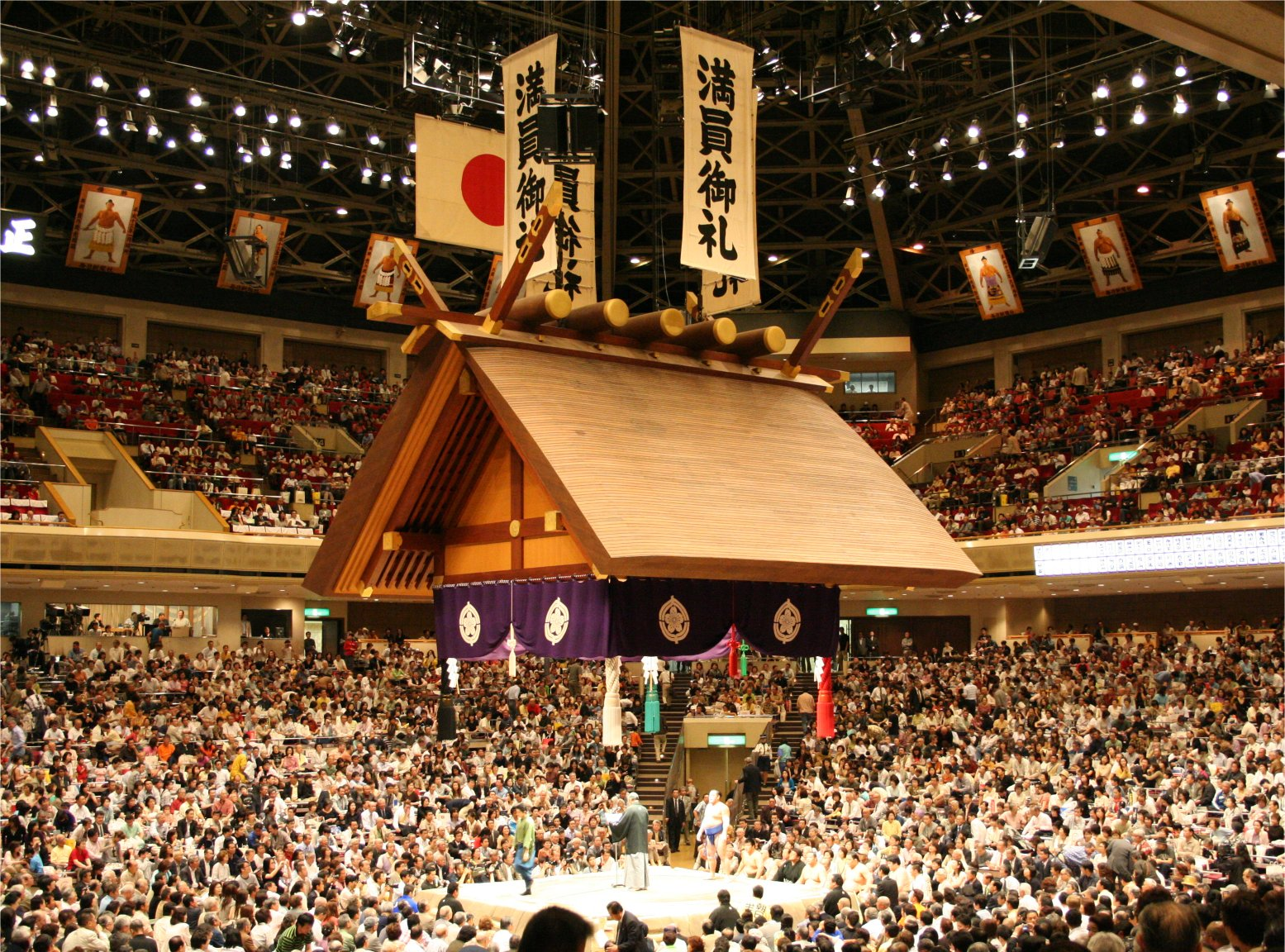
Ryogoku Kokugikan Tsuriyane 05212006.jpg

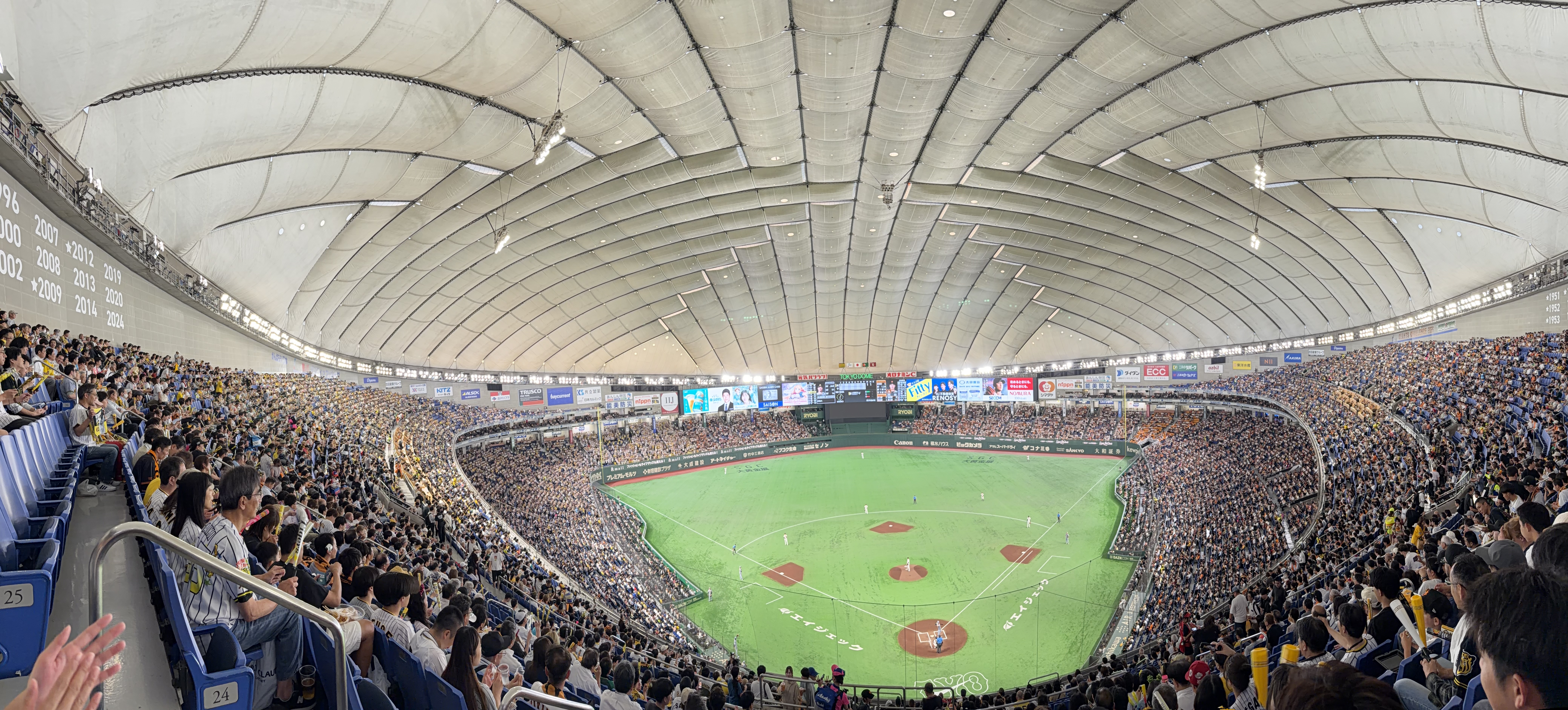
Panorama of the Tokyo Dome

Tokyo, with a diverse array of sports, is home to two professional baseball teams, the Yomiuri Giants, who play at the Tokyo Dome, and Tokyo Yakult Swallows at Meiji-Jingu Stadium. The Japan Sumo Association is also headquartered in Tokyo at the Ryōgoku Kokugikan sumo arena where three official sumo tournaments are held annually (in January, May, and September). Soccer clubs in Tokyo include FC Tokyo and Tokyo Verdy, both of which play at Ajinomoto Stadium in Chōfu, and Machida Zelvia at Machida GION Stadium in Machida. Rugby Union is also played in Tokyo, with multiple Japan Rugby League One clubs based in the city including: Black Rams Tokyo (Setagaya), Tokyo Sungoliath (Fuchū) and Toshiba Brave Lupus Tokyo (Fuchū).

Basketball teams include the Hitachi SunRockers, Toyota Alvark Tokyo, and Tokyo Excellence.

Tokyo hosted the 1964 Summer Olympics, thus becoming the first Asian city to host the Summer Games. The National Stadium, also known as the Olympic Stadium, was host to several international sporting events. In 2016, it was to be replaced by the New National Stadium. With several world-class sports venues, Tokyo often hosts national and international sporting events such as basketball tournaments, women's volleyball tournaments, tennis tournaments, swim meets, marathons, rugby union and sevens rugby games, soccer exhibition games, judo, and karate. Tokyo Metropolitan Gymnasium, in Sendagaya, Shibuya, is a large sports complex that includes swimming pools, training rooms, and a large indoor arena. According to Around the Rings, the gymnasium has played host to the October 2011 Artistic Gymnastics World Championships, despite the International Gymnastics Federation's initial doubt in Tokyo's ability to host the championships after the 2011 Tohoku earthquake hit Japan. Tokyo was also selected to host several games for the 2019 Rugby World Cup, and to host the 2020 Summer Olympics and Paralympics, which had to be rescheduled to the summer of 2021 due to COVID-19 pandemic.

== Sister cities and states ==
As of 2022, Tokyo has twinning or friendship agreements with the following twelve cities and states:

- New York City, United States (since February 1960)
- Beijing, China (since March 1979)
- Paris, France (since July 1982)
- New South Wales, Australia (since May 1984)
- Seoul, South Korea (since September 1988)
- Jakarta, Indonesia (since October 1989)
- São Paulo State, Brazil (since June 1990)
- Cairo, Egypt (since October 1990)
- Moscow, Russia (since July 1991)
- Berlin, Germany (since May 1994)
- Rome, Italy (since July 1996)
- London, England (since October 2015)

=== Friendship and cooperation agreements ===
- Tomsk Oblast, Russia (since May 2015)
- Brussels, Belgium (since October 2016)
- Los Angeles County, United States (since August 2021)

== See also ==
- List of cities proper by population
- List of cities with the most skyscrapers
- List of tallest structures in Tokyo
- List of development projects in Tokyo
- List of largest cities
- List of metropolitan areas in Asia
- List of most expensive cities for expatriate employees
- List of urban agglomerations in Asia
- List of urban areas by population
- Megacity
- Tokyo dialect
- Yamanote and Shitamachi

== Bibliography ==
- Fiévé, Nicolas and Paul Waley (2003). Japanese Capitals in Historical Perspective: Place, Power and Memory in Kyoto, Edo and Tokyo. London: RoutledgeCurzon. ISBN 978-0-7007-1409-4; OCLC 51527561
- McClain, James, John M Merriman and Kaoru Ugawa (1994). Edo and Paris: Urban Life and the State in the Early Modern Era. Ithaca: Cornell University Press. ISBN 978-0-8014-2987-3; OCLC 30157716
- Nussbaum, Louis-Frédéric and Käthe Roth (2005). Japan encyclopedia Archived January 11, 2023, at the Wayback Machine. Cambridge: Harvard University Press. ISBN 978-0-674-01753-5; OCLC 58053128

Preceded by Heian-kyō	Capital of Japan; 1868–present	Most recent
