= Breakaway =

Breakaway or Break Away may refer to:

== Film, television and radio ==
- Breakaway (1955 film), a British film
- Breakaway (1966 film), an American short film by Bruce Conner
- Breakaway (1990 film), an Australian film featuring Deborah Kara Unger
- Breakaway, a 1996 American film featuring Tonya Harding
- Breakaway, a 2003 film starring Dean Cain
- Breakaway (2011 film), a Canadian film
- "Breakaway" (Space: 1999), the opening episode of the British TV series Space: 1999
- Breakaway, a 1980 English TV series written by Francis Durbridge
- Breakaway PPV, a Canadian pay-per-view television provider
- Breakaway (radio programme), a British travel programme on BBC Radio 4
- Breakaway, a 2021 American sports documentary produced for ESPN's 30 for 30 series

== Sports ==
- Breakaway (cycling), a cycling term for a single rider or group of riders detaching from the peloton to advance their position in front of it
- Breakaway (ice hockey), a situation in which there are no defenders (except for the goaltender) between an attacking player and the goal
- Breakaway (rugby union) or flanker, a position in rugby union
- Breakaway rim, a type of basketball hoop
- Breakaway roping, a rodeo event

== Video gaming ==
- Breakaway (2010 video game), a soccer video game
- Breakaway (cancelled video game), a cancelled video game produced by Amazon Game Studios
- BreakAway Games, an American video game developer

== Music ==
- The Breakaways, an English female vocal trio
- Breakaway music, a U.S. Naval tradition

=== Albums ===
- Breakaway (Art Garfunkel album), 1975, and the title song, "Break Away" (see below)
- Breakaway (First Choice album), 1980
- Breakaway (Gallagher and Lyle album), 1976, and the title song (see below)
- Breakaway (Kelly Clarkson album), 2004, and the title song (see below)
- Breakaway (Kim Appleby album), 1993
- Breakaway (Kris Kristofferson album), a 1974 duet album by Kristofferson and Rita Coolidge
- Breakaway, a 1991 release by the Pasadena Roof Orchestra

=== Songs ===
- "Break Away" (Art Garfunkel song), 1975; covered by its writers, Gallagher and Lyle, 1976
- "Break Away" (The Beach Boys song), 1969
- "Breakaway" (Big Pig song), 1987
- "Breakaway" (Donna Summer song), 1989
- "Break Away" (Gail Davies song), 1985
- "Breakaway" (Irma Thomas song), 1964; covered by Tracey Ullman, 1983
- "Break Away" (Ivy Quainoo song), 2012; covered by Celine Dion as "Breakaway", 2013
- "Breakaway" (Kelly Clarkson song), 2004
- "Break Away (from That Boy)", by the Newbeats, 1965
- "Breakaway", written by Con Conrad, Archie Gottler, and Sidney D. Mitchell for the film Fox Movietone Follies of 1929
- "Breakaway", by Alan Parsons from Try Anything Once, 1993
- "Breakaway", by Basement Jaxx from Rooty, 2001
- "Breakaway", by Bruce Springsteen from The Promise, 2010
- "Breakaway", by Candlebox from Happy Pills, 1998
- "Breakaway", by the Cars from the B-side of the single "Why Can't I Have You", 1985
- "Break Away", by Ella Hunt, Sarah Swire and Malcolm Cumming from the film Anna and the Apocalypse, 2017
- "Break Away", by Firewind from Firewind, 2020
- "Breakaway", by George Ezra from Wanted on Voyage, 2014
- "Break Away", by Gotthard from Need to Believe, 2009
- "Breakaway", by In Hearts Wake from Skydancer, 2015
- "Breakaway", by the Springfields, 1961
- "Break Away", by Staind from The Illusion of Progress, 2008
- "Breakaway", by Stratovarius from Survive, 2022
- "Break Away", by Sturm und Drang from Rock 'n Roll Children, 2008
- "Break Away", by Subdigitals, used in the end credits of the show Code Lyoko, 2005
- "Breakaway", by Tinchy Stryder from Star in the Hood, 2007
- "Break Away", by Tokio Hotel from Scream, 2007
- "Breakaway", by Tori Amos from Native Invader, 2017
- "Breakaway", by ZZ Top from Antenna, 1994

== Other uses ==
- Breakaway (biscuit), a chocolate bar produced by Nestlé
- Breakaway friction, or stiction, the threshold of force required to overcome static cohesion
- Breakaway (FIRST), the game in the 2010 FIRST Robotics Competition
- A break away!, an 1891 painting by Australian artist Tom Roberts
- Breakaway (dance), a 1920s dance style
- Break Away (organization), nonprofit organization that promotes the development of quality alternative break programs
- Breakaway Airport, an airport located in Cedar Park, Texas
- Breakaway (Transformers), a fictional character in the Transformers universe
- Breakaway, Queensland, a suburb of Mount Isa, Australia
- Breakaway object, a type of theatrical property
  - Breakaway vase, a vase that is fake

== See also ==
- Breaking Away (disambiguation)
- Norwegian Breakaway, a 2011 cruise ship operated by Norwegian Cruise Line
- Crevasse wall breakaway, in glaciology, an informal classification that can result from ice calving
- Secession
