= Akitsu Station (Tokyo) =

Railway station in Higashimurayama, Tokyo, Japan

SI16 Akitsu Station 秋津駅
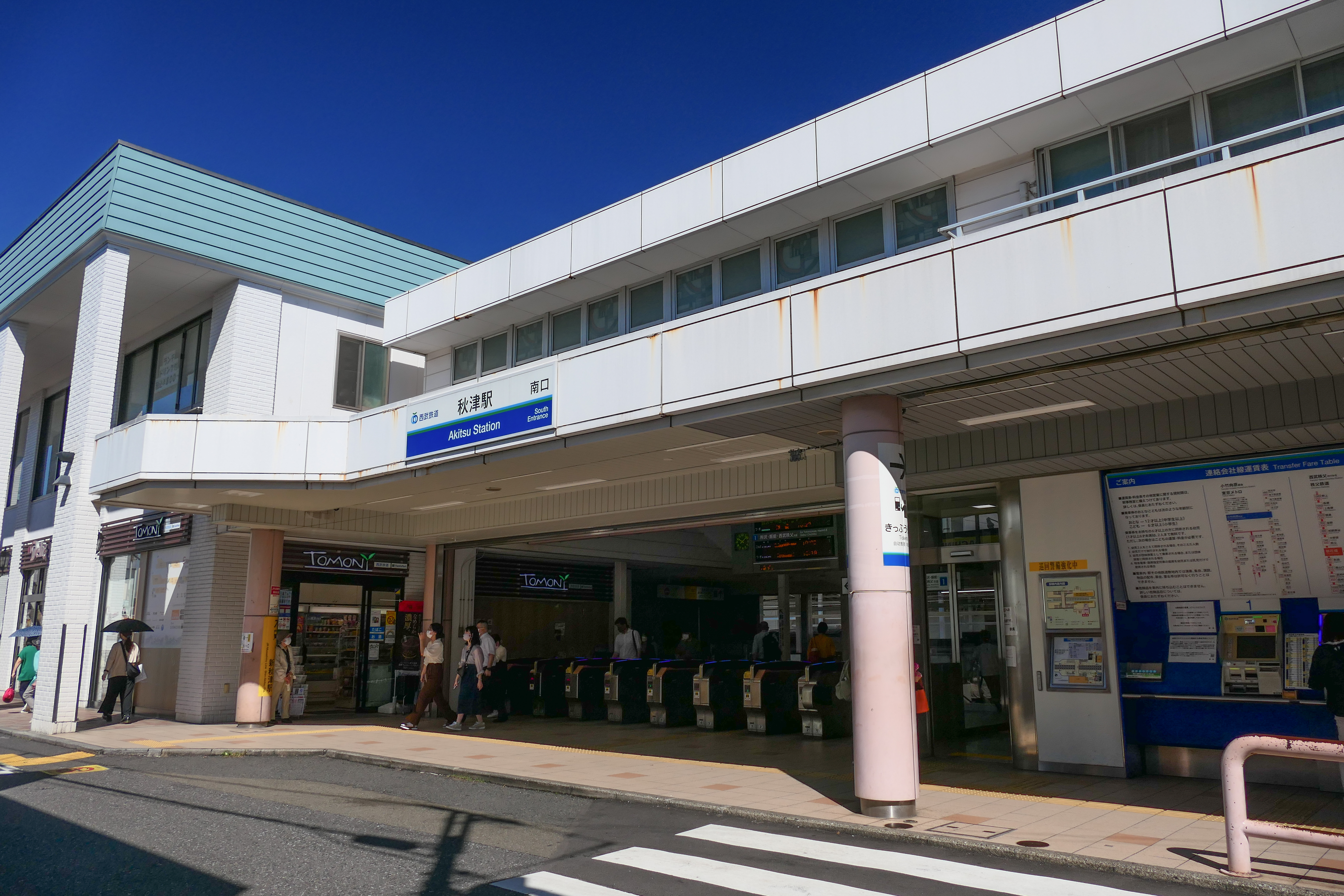
- Akitsu-Station south entrance, October 2021

General information
- Location: 5-7-8 Akitsu-chō, Higashimurayama-shi, Tokyo 189-0001; Japan
- Coordinates: 35.77828°N 139.49675°E
- Operator: Seibu Railway
- Line: Seibu Ikebukuro Line
- Distance: 24.6 km from Ikebukuro
- Platforms: 2 side platforms

Other information
- Station code: SI16
- Website: Official website

History
- Opened: December 12, 1917

Passengers
- FY2019: 81,168 daily

Services
Preceding station	Seibu Railway	Following station
Tokorozawa One-way operation	Ikebukuro Line Commuter Semi Express	Kiyose SI15 towards Ikebukuro
Tokorozawa SI17 towards Hannō	Ikebukuro Line Rapid Semi Express	Kiyose SI15 towards Ikebukuro
Tokorozawa SI17 towards Agano	Ikebukuro Line Local	Kiyose SI15 towards Ikebukuro
Location
- Location within Tokyo Location within Japan

Track diagram showing the correlation between Akitsu and Shin-Akitsu stations

Akitsu Station (秋津駅, Akitsu-eki) is a passenger railway station located in the city of Higashimurayama, Tokyo, Japan, operated by the private railway operator Seibu Railway.

== Lines ==
Akitsu Station is served by the Seibu Ikebukuro Line from Ikebukuro in Tokyo, with some services inter-running via the Tokyo Metro Yurakucho Line to Shin-Kiba and the Tokyo Metro Fukutoshin Line to Shibuya and onward via the Tokyu Toyoko Line and Minato Mirai Line to Motomachi-Chukagai. Located between Kiyose and Tokorozawa, it is 21.8 km from the Ikebukuro terminus. The station also offers an interchange with Shin-Akitsu Station on the JR Musashino Line, which is a short walk away.

== Station layout ==
The station has two ground-level side platforms serving two tracks.

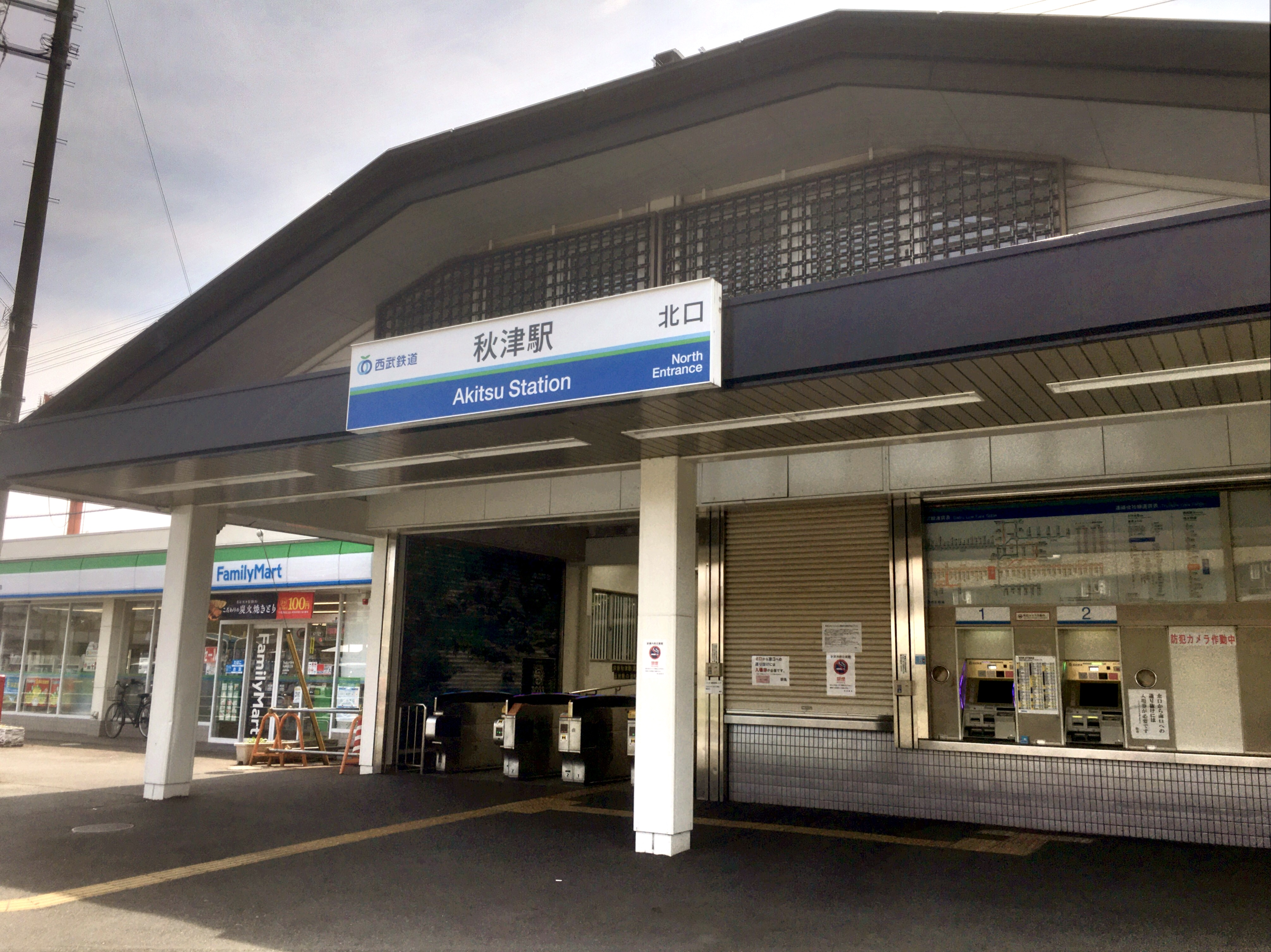
North exit, August 2020

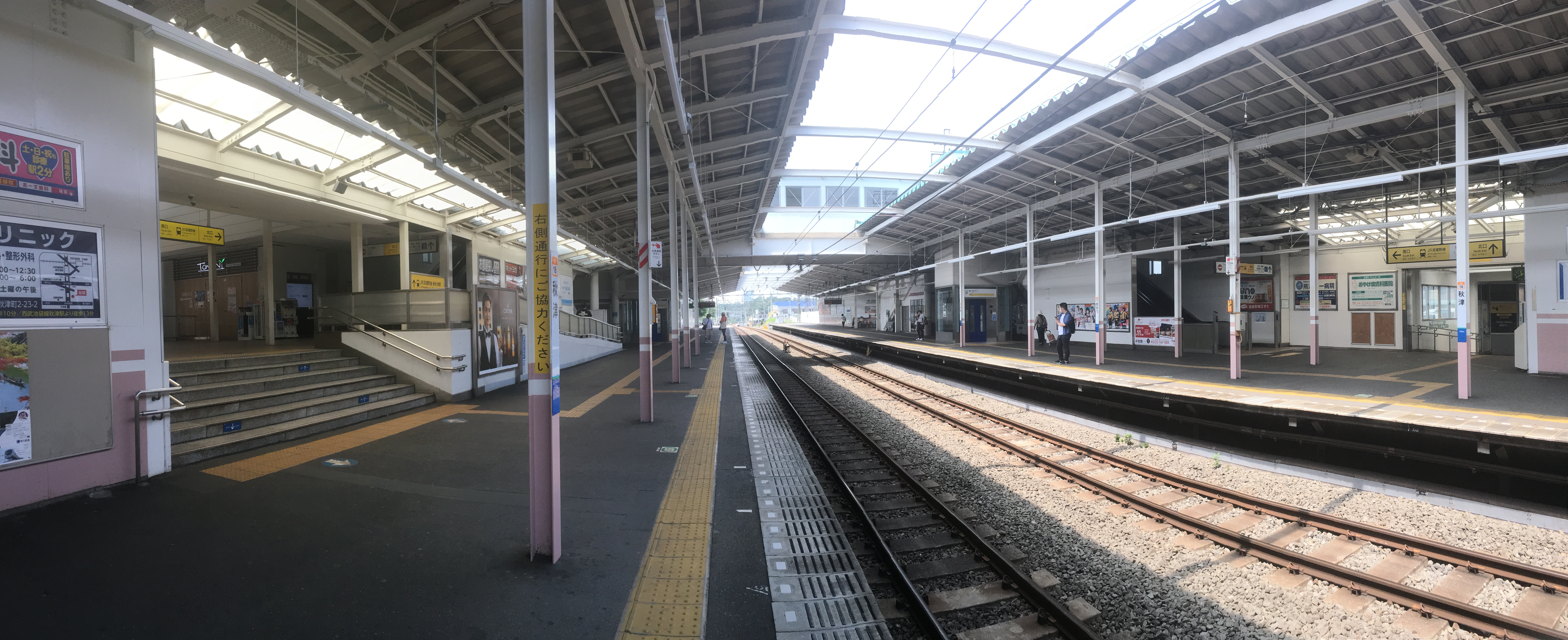
Akitsu Station platforms, 2020

=== Platforms ===
1	Seibu Ikebukuro Line	for Tokorozawa and Hannō
2	Seibu Ikebukuro Line	for Nerima and Ikebukuro; Tokyo Metro Yurakucho Line for Shin-Kiba; Tokyo Metro Fukutoshin Line for Shibuya; Tōkyū Tōyoko Line for Yokohama; Minatomirai Line for Motomachi-Chukagai

== History ==
Akitsu Station opened on December 12, 1917.

Station numbering was introduced on all Seibu Railway lines during fiscal 2012, with Akitsu Station becoming "SI16".

Through-running to and from Yokohama and Motomachi-Chukagai via the Tokyu Toyoko Line and Minatomirai Line commenced on 16 March 2013.

== Passenger statistics ==
In fiscal 2019, the station was the 10th busiest on the Seibu network with an average of 81,168 passengers daily.

The passenger figures for previous years are as shown below.

Fiscal year	Daily average
2005	71,126
2010	76,177
2015	79,774

== Surrounding area ==
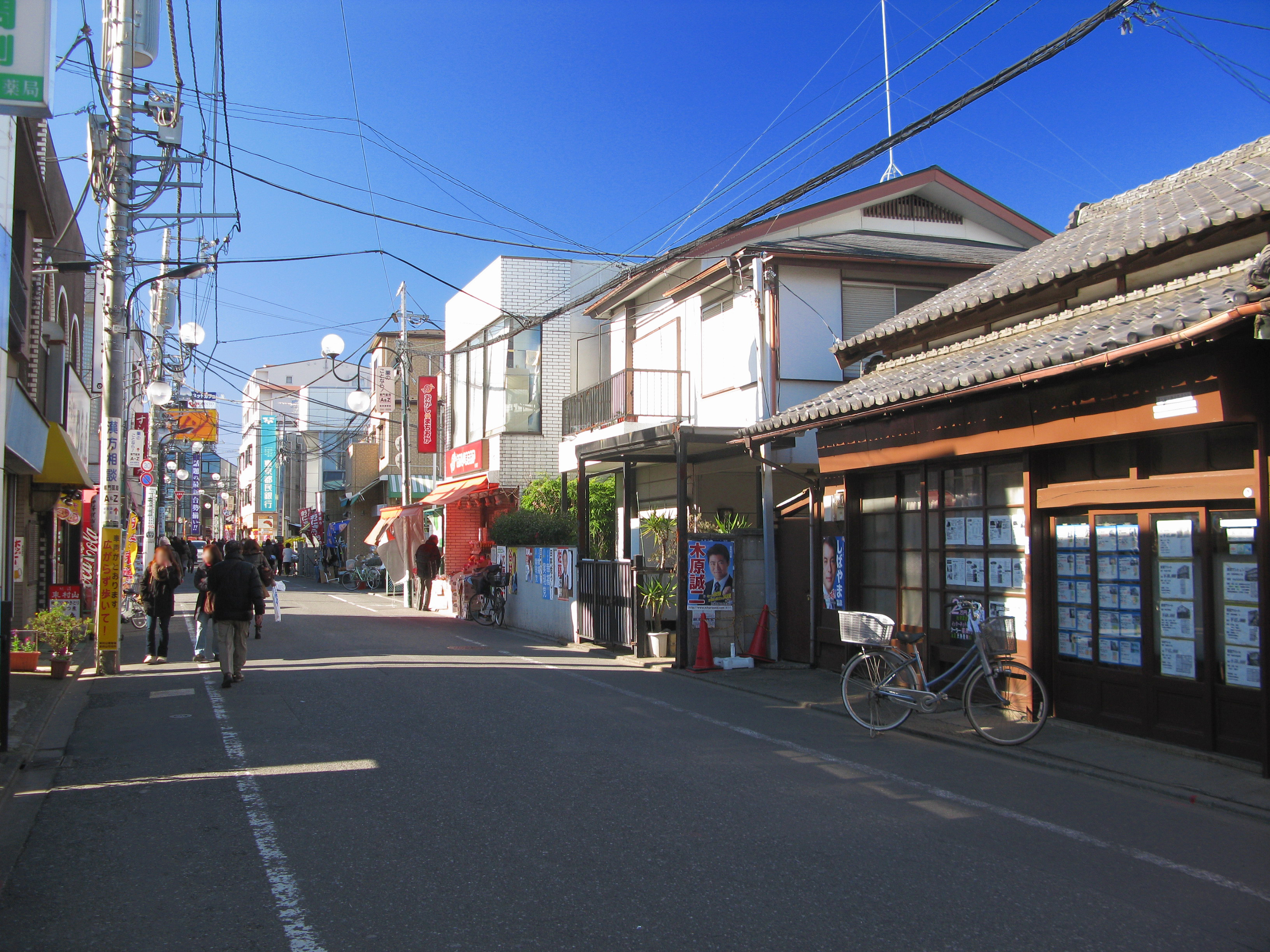
The shopping street in Higashimurayama, Tokyo, leading from Akitsu Station on the Seibu Ikebukuro Line to Shin-Akitsu Station on the JR Musashino Line, January 2013

=== South exit ===
- Shin-Akitsu Station (Musashino Line)
- Akitsu Shrine

=== North exit ===
- Meiji Pharmaceutical University

== See also ==
- List of railway stations in Japan
- Akitsu Station (Hiroshima), a station in Hiroshima with a similar name
