= Takiyama Castle (Tokyo) =

Castle ruins in Hachiōji, Japan

- 滝山城
- Hachiōji, Tokyo Prefecture, Japan
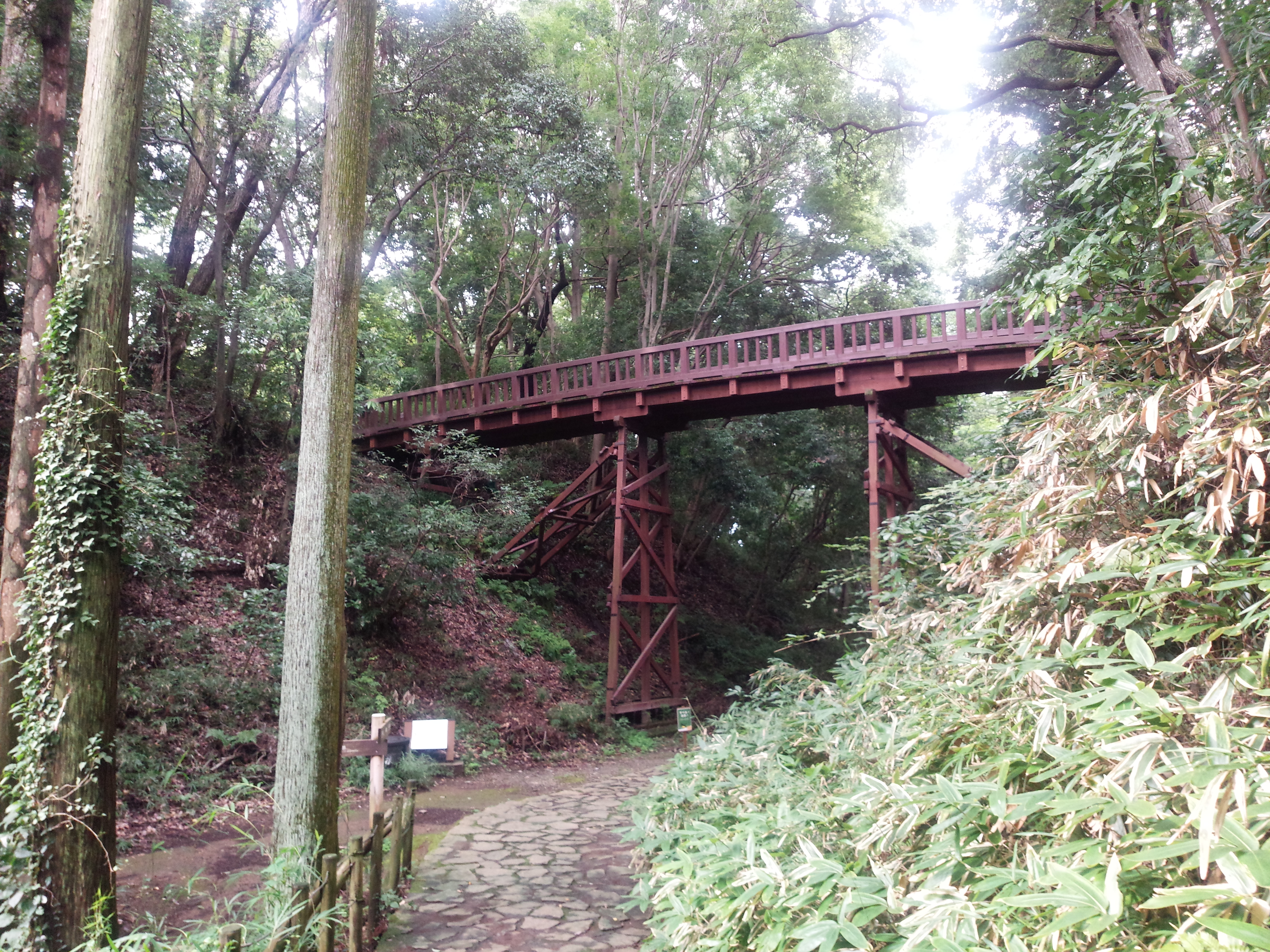
- Reconstructed bridge between Honmaru and Nakanomaru

Site information
- Type: Hirayama-style castle
- Owner: Ōishi clan, Later Hōjō clan
- Condition: ruins

Location
- Takiyama Castle
- Location within Tokyo Location within Japan
- Coordinates: 35°42′7.06″N 139°19′41.85″E

Site history
- Built: 1521
- Built by: Ōishi clan
- Demolished: 1576?
- Events: Battle of Takiyama

Garrison information
- Past commanders: Ōishi Sadahisa, Hōjō Ujiteru

Takiyama Castle (滝山城, Takiyama-jō) was a Japanese castle located in what is now the Tani neighborhood of the city of Hachiōji, Tokyo, Japan. Its ruins have protected as a National Historic Site since 2007.

== Situation ==
Takiyama Castle is located on a long ridge south of the Tama River, next to the confluence of the Tama River coming from the Ome area with the Aki River from the Okutama areas of Musashi Province. The castle site and surrounding area are within the borders of the Takiyama Prefectural Natural Park.

== History ==
During the Muromachi period, this portion of Musashi Province was ruled by the Ōishi clan, vassals of the Ogigayatsu-branch of the Uesugi clan and shugodai of Musashi Province. They were one of the major military powers in the Kantō region. Ōishi Sadashige constructed Takiyama Castle in 1521 to replace an earlier stronghold at Takatsuki, approximately one kilometer away. However, the Uesugi clan was soon eclipsed by the rising power of the Late Hōjō clan based at Odawara, who had conquered all of neighboring Sagami Province by around 1530. The Hōjō then set their sights north, decisively defeating the Uesugi at the 1546 Siege of Kawagoe Castle. The Ōishi clan was forced to submit to Hōjō Ujiteru, who made Takiyama Castle his field headquarters for the conquest of Musashi.

Ujiteru expanded and improved the defences of the castle. Prior to Hōjō Ujiteru, Takiyama Castle was a simple structure with two enclosures, the Honmaru (central bailey) or Nakanomaru (intermediate bailey) with rudimentary defenses. Ujiteru added a Ninomaru (second bailey), Sannomaru (third bailey) and Komiya Kuruwa (Komiya enclosure), each surrounded by dry moats and earthen ramparts. Each gate was fortified with a yagura tower and with an umadashi buffer area in front of the gate to make a direct front assault impossible.

In 1569, Takeda Shingen, the warlord of Kai Province attempted to seize the castle during the Siege of Todoriko. The Takeda army had 20,000 men led by Takeda Katsuyori and seized the opposite bank of the Tama River. However, the true purpose of the attack was feint in an attempt to draw off Hōjō forces from Shingen's real target, which was Odawara Castle. Although Shingen managed to encircle and threaten Odawara for a week, he eventually gave up and returned to Kai Province, and the forces at Takiyama Castle were also withdrawn. One result of the battle was that it revealed to Hōjō Ujiteru critical weaknesses of Takiyama Castle. Not only were the defenses of the castle obsolete due to advances in military technology (such as the introduction of gunpowder), but the site was limited geographically and the castle area could not be expanded to allow for more defense in depth. Furthermore, the location of the castle proved that it was not an obstruction for Takeda army to attack the Hōjō home territory at Odawara. Therefore, a few years after the battle, Hōjō Ujiteru relocated to Hachiōji Castle, and by 1584 Takiyama Castle was abandoned.

== Current ==
The castle is now only ruins, just some remnants of moats and earthworks. A bridge between Honmaru base and Nakanomaru base was reconstructed. The castle was listed as one of the Continued Top 100 Japanese Castles in 2017. It is located approximately ten minutes from "Takiyama Jyoshi Shita" bus stop of Nishi-Tokyo bus from the JR East Hachiōji Station.

== Gallery ==
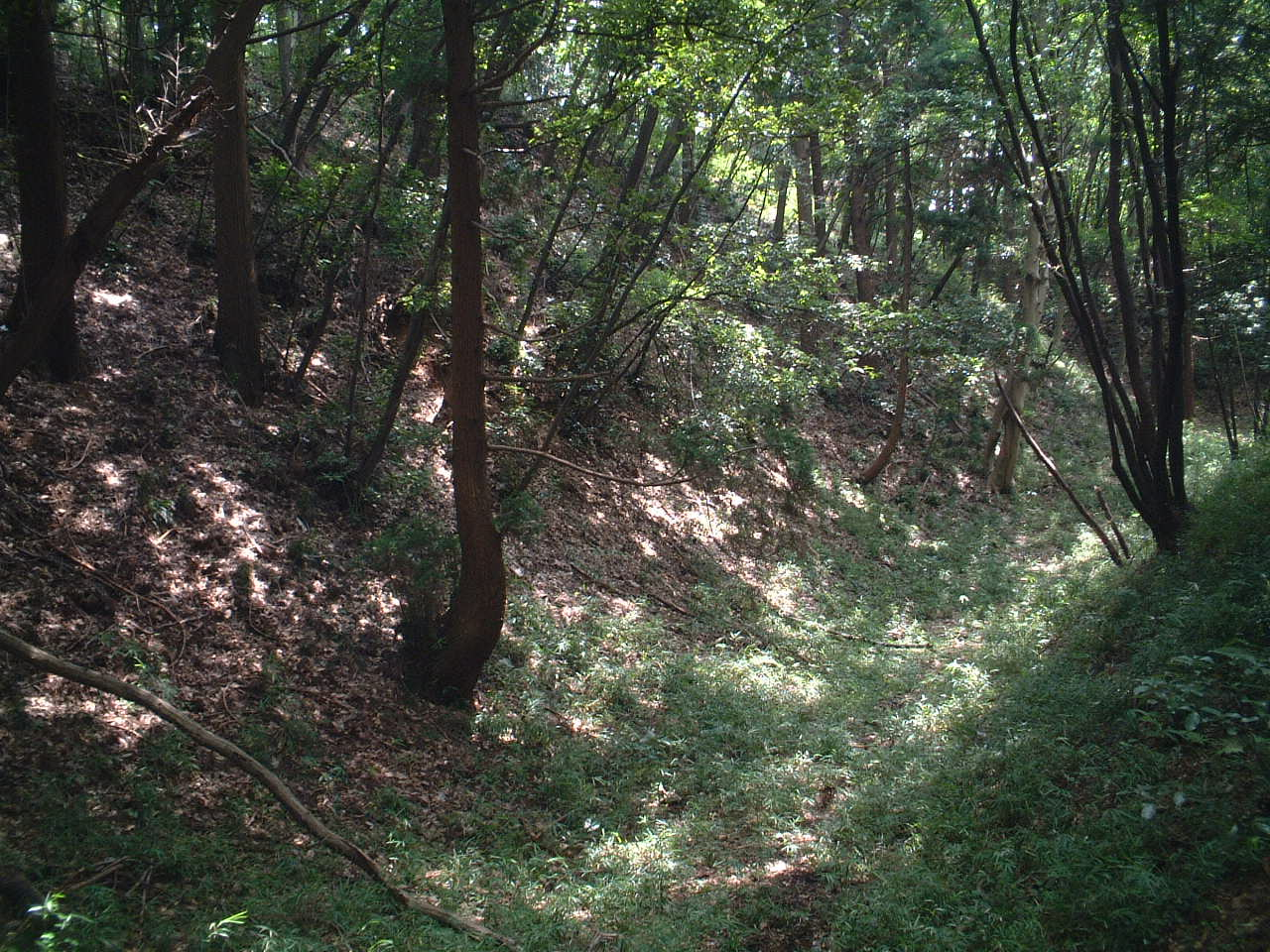
Dry Moat of Takiyama Castle

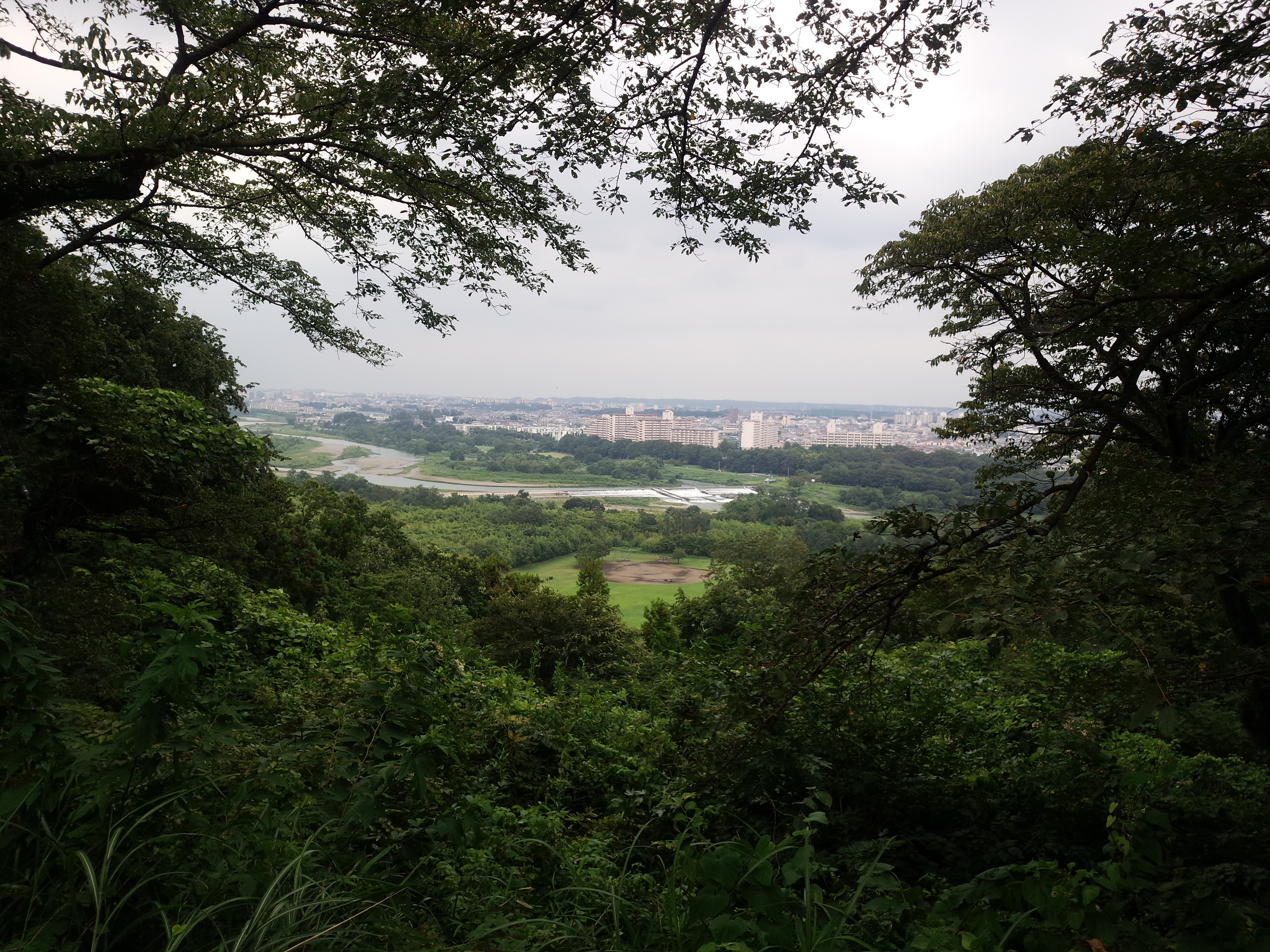
View from Nakanomaru Compound

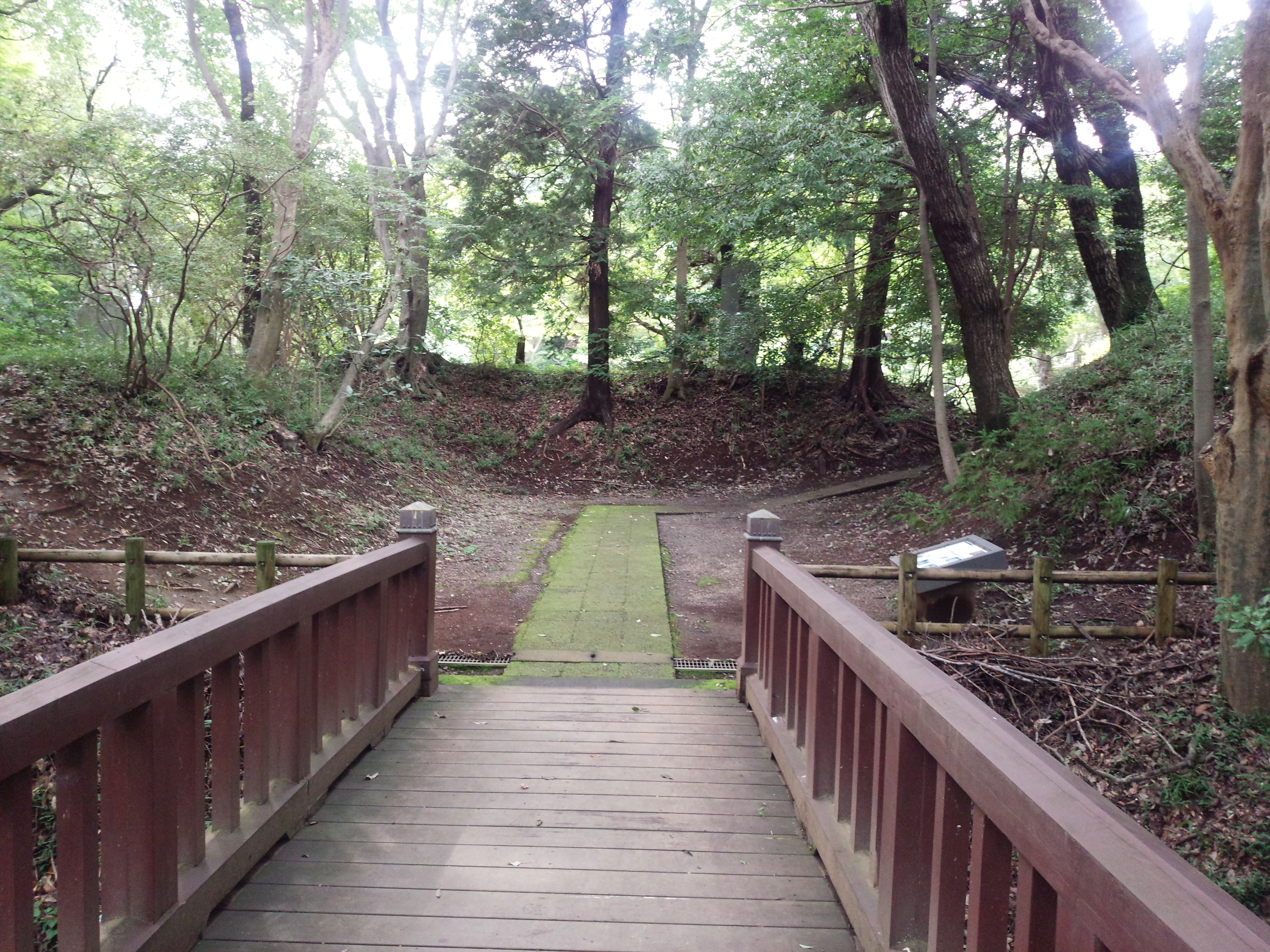
Masugata gate of Honmaru Compound

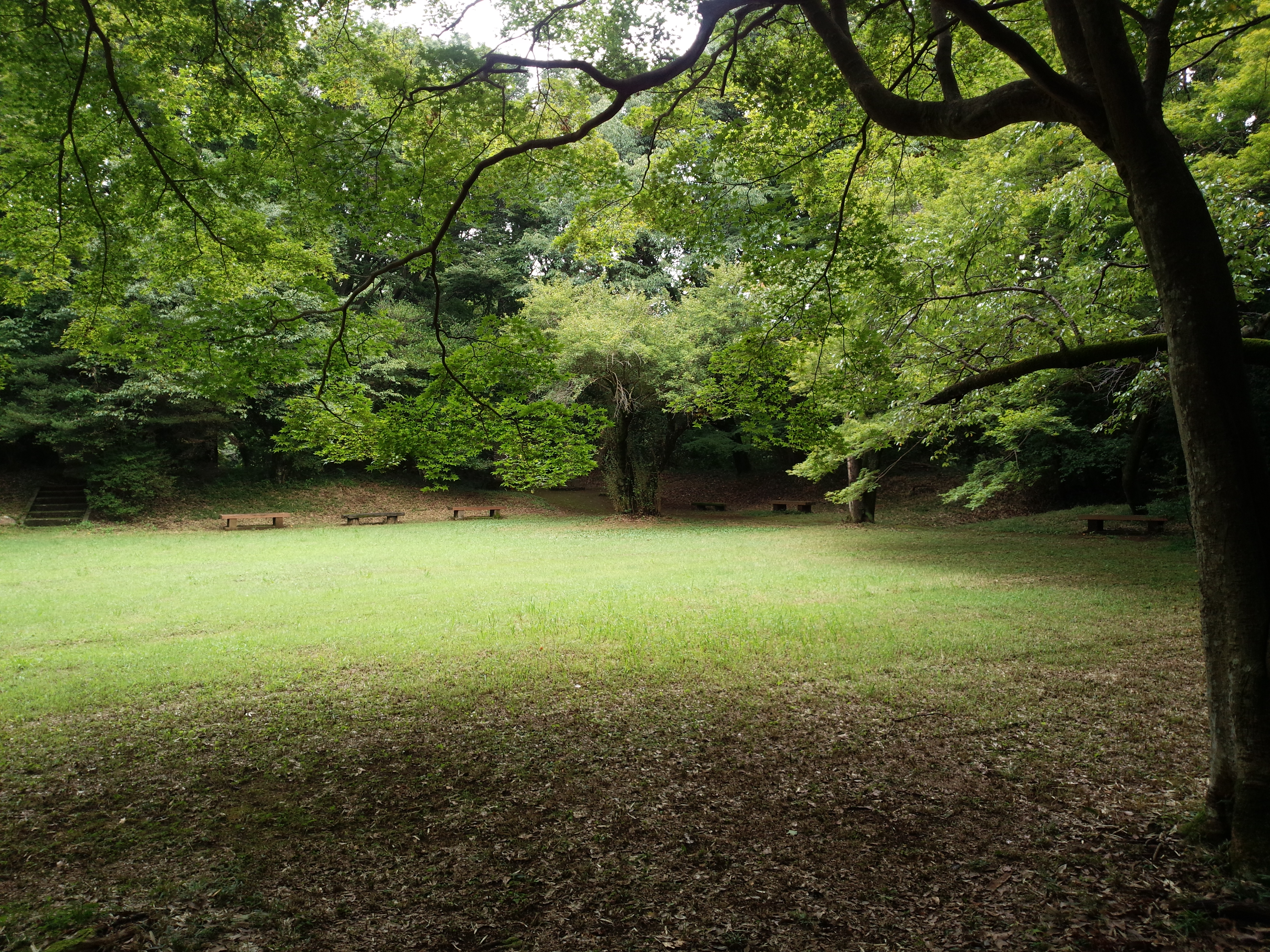
Honmaru Compound of Takiyama Castle

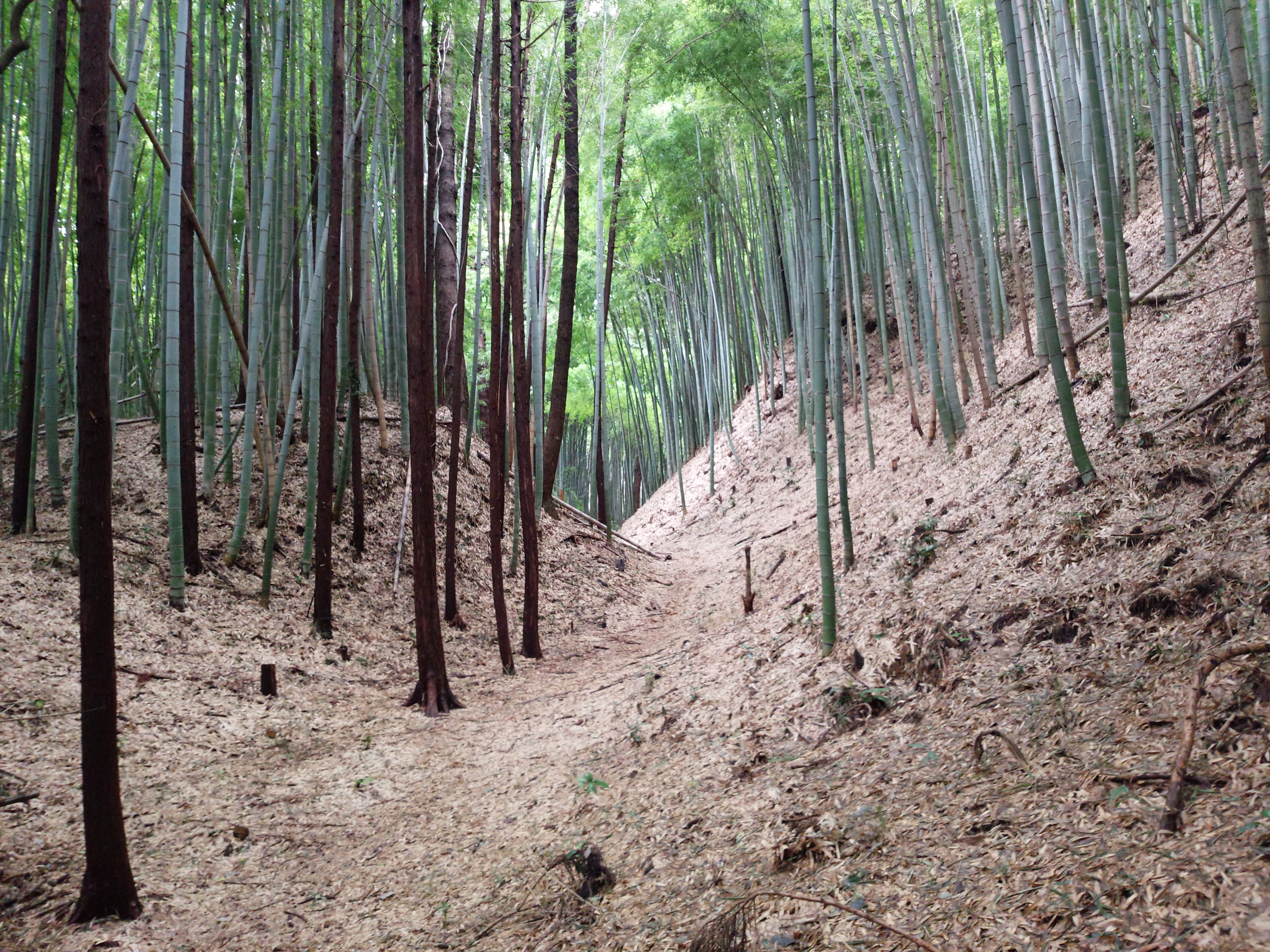
Dry moat of Komiya Compound

== See also ==
- List of Historic Sites of Japan (Tōkyō)

== Literature ==
- Motoo, Hinago (1986). Japanese Castles. Tokyo: Kodansha. p. 200 pages. ISBN 0-87011-766-1.
- Turnbull, Stephen (2003). Japanese Castles 1540-1640. Osprey Publishing. p. 64 pages. ISBN 1-84176-429-9.
