= Oishi =

Oishi may refer to:

- Ōishi (surname), a Japanese surname
- Oishi (Philippine brand), a snack company from the Philippines
- Oishi Group, a Thai food-and-drink company
- Ōishi Station, a train station in Nada-ku, Kobe, Hyōgo Prefecture, Japan
- 3379 Oishi, a main-belt asteroid
