= Akikawa Kyūryō Prefectural Natural Park =

Prefectural Natural Park in Tokyo, Japan

- 都立秋川丘陵自然公園
- Interactive map of Akikawa Kyūryō Prefectural Natural Park
- Location: Tokyo, Japan
- Coordinates: 35.7137°N 139.2728°E
- Area: 13.35 km^{2} (5.15 sq mi)
- Established: 1 October 1953

Akikawa Kyūryō Prefectural Natural Park (都立秋川丘陵自然公園, Toritsu Akikawa Kyūryō shizen kōen) is a Prefectural Natural Park in Tokyo, Japan. Established in 1953, it is in the foothills on the right bank of the Aki River (秋川). It is adjacent to the Chichibu Tama Kai National Park and Takiyama Prefectural Natural Park.

== See also ==
- National Parks of Japan
- Parks and gardens in Tokyo
