= Florida State University College of Social Work =

College of Social Work
- Former names: School of Social Work, School of Social Welfare
- Type: Public
- Established: 1928
- Parent institution: Florida State University
- Dean: Kirk Foster
- Academic staff: 57
- Students: 1363
- Location: Tallahassee, Florida, U.S. 30°26′19.7″N 84°18′13.0″W
- Website: www.csw.fsu.edu

The Florida State University College of Social Work, is the social work college of the Florida State University. The college is the oldest social work program and the only college of social work in the state of Florida. About 1363 students are enrolled, including undergraduates and graduate students, including Bachelor of Social Work (BSW), Master of Social Work (MSW), and Doctor of Philosophy-seeking students. The BSW and MSW programs are accredited by the Council on Social Work Education.

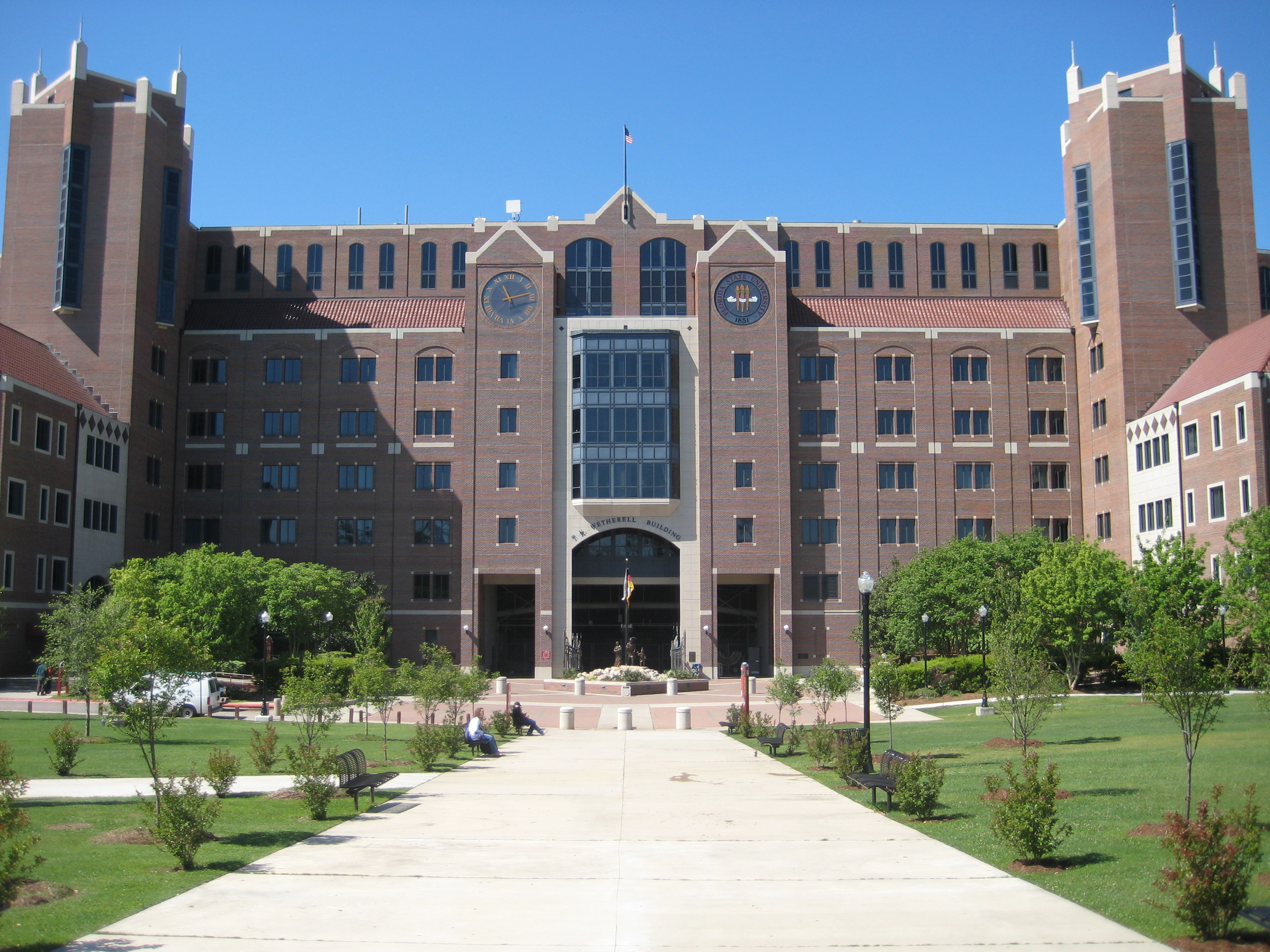
The entrance to University Center, where the College of Social Work is located.

== Institutes and Centers ==
The college houses seven institutes and centers: Florida Institute for Child Welfare (FICW), Stoops Center for Communities, Families, and Children (CFC Center), Institute for Quality Children's Services (IQCS), Institute for Trauma and Resilience Studies (ITRS) (formerly Institute for Family Violence Studies), Justice and Health Innovation Research Institute (JHI), Multidisciplinary Evaluation and Testing Center (MDC), and Maura's Voice Research Fund (Maura's Voice).

== International programs ==
The College of Social Work offers a summer study abroad program in Belfast, Northern Ireland and an exchange program for BSW students in partnership with Jönköping University in Jönköping, Sweden. Additionally, the college offers an Alternative Spring Break trip to Grenada and international field placements in the UK and Canada.

== Rankings and reputation ==
As of 2024, it is ranked tied for 36th out of 319 schools for social work in the United States by U.S. News & World Report.

== See also ==
- List of social work schools
