= List of social work schools =

This is a list of notable social work schools offering a degree program in social work.

Social work is an academic discipline and practice-based profession concerned with meeting the basic needs of individuals, families, groups, communities, and society as a whole to enhance their individual and collective well-being. Social work practice draws from liberal arts, social science, and interdisciplinary areas such as psychology, sociology, health, political science, community development, law, and economics to engage with systems and policies, conduct assessments, develop interventions, and enhance social functioning and responsibility. The ultimate goals of social work include the improvement of people's lives, alleviation of biopsychosocial concerns, empowerment of individuals and communities, and the achievement of social reform.

Qualifications for professional social work vary by country. Some countries offer postgraduate degrees in social work, including a Master of Social Work or Doctor of Social Work.

== Canada ==
| Province | School | Parent Institution | City |
|---|---|---|---|
| Ontario | Factor-Inwentash Faculty of Social Work | University of Toronto | Toronto |

== Denmark ==
| City | School | Parent Institution |
|---|---|---|
| Odense | School of Social Work, Odense – University College, Little Belt | UCL University College |

== England ==
| City | School | Parent Institution |
|---|---|---|
| Norwich | UEA School of Social Work and Psychology | University of East Anglia |

== India ==
| City | School | Parent Institution |
|---|---|---|
| Delhi | Delhi School of Social Work | Delhi University |
| Kolkata | Vidyasagar School of Social Work | Vidyasagar School of Social Work |

== Israel ==
| City | School | Parent Institution |
|---|---|---|
| Rehovot | Paul Baerwald School of Social Work and Social Welfare | Hebrew University of Jerusalem |

== Japan ==
| City | School | Parent Institution |
|---|---|---|
| Kiyose, Tokyo | Japan College of Social Work | Japan College of Social Work |

== United States ==
| State | School | Parent Institution | City |
|---|---|---|---|
| California | UC Berkeley School of Social Welfare | University of California, Berkeley | Berkeley |
| California | USC Suzanne Dworak-Peck School of Social Work | University of Southern California | Los Angeles |
| Colorado | Graduate School of Social Work at the University of Denver | University of Denver | Denver |
| Florida | Florida State University College of Social Work | Florida State University | Tallahassee |
| Georgia | University of Georgia School of Social Work | University of Georgia | Athens |
| Illinois | Crown Family School of Social Work, Policy and Practice | University of Chicago | Chicago |
| Illinois | Institute for Clinical Social Work | Institute for Clinical Social Work | Chicago |
| Illinois | University of Illinois School of Social Work | University of Illinois Urbana-Champaign | Urbana |
| Kentucky | University of Kentucky College of Social Work | University of Kentucky | Lexington |
| Louisiana | Tulane University School of Social Work | Tulane University | New Orleans |
| Maryland | University of Maryland School of Social Work | University of Maryland, Baltimore | Baltimore |
| Massachusetts | Boston College School of Social Work | Boston College | Boston |
| Massachusetts | Boston University School of Social Work | Boston University | Boston |
| Massachusetts | Smith College School for Social Work | Smith College | Northampton |
| Michigan | University of Michigan School of Social Work | University of Michigan | Ann Arbor |
| Michigan | Wayne State University School of Social Work | Wayne State University | Detroit |
| Missouri | George Warren Brown School of Social Work | Washington University in St. Louis | St. Louis |
| Missouri | Saint Louis University School of Social Work | Saint Louis University | St. Louis |
| New Jersey | Rutgers School of Social Work | Rutgers University–New Brunswick | New Brunswick |
| North Carolina | UNC School of Social Work | University of North Carolina at Chapel Hill | Chapel Hill |
| New York | Columbia University School of Social Work | Columbia University | New York |
| New York | Fordham Graduate School of Social Service | Fordham University | New York |
| New York | Silver School of Social Work | New York University | New York |
| New York | Silberman School of Social Work | Hunter College | New York |
| New York | Wurzweiler School of Social Work | Yeshiva University | New York |
| Ohio | Mandel School of Applied Social Sciences | Case Western Reserve University | Cleveland |
| Pennsylvania | School of Social Policy and Practice | University of Pennsylvania | Philadelphia |
| Pennsylvania | University of Pittsburgh School of Social Work | University of Pittsburgh | Pittsburgh |
| Texas | Steve Hicks School of Social Work | University of Texas at Austin | Austin |
| Washington | University of Washington School of Social Work | University of Washington | Seattle |
