= Kiyose Station =

Railway station in Kiyose, Tokyo, Japan

SI15 Kiyose Station 清瀬駅
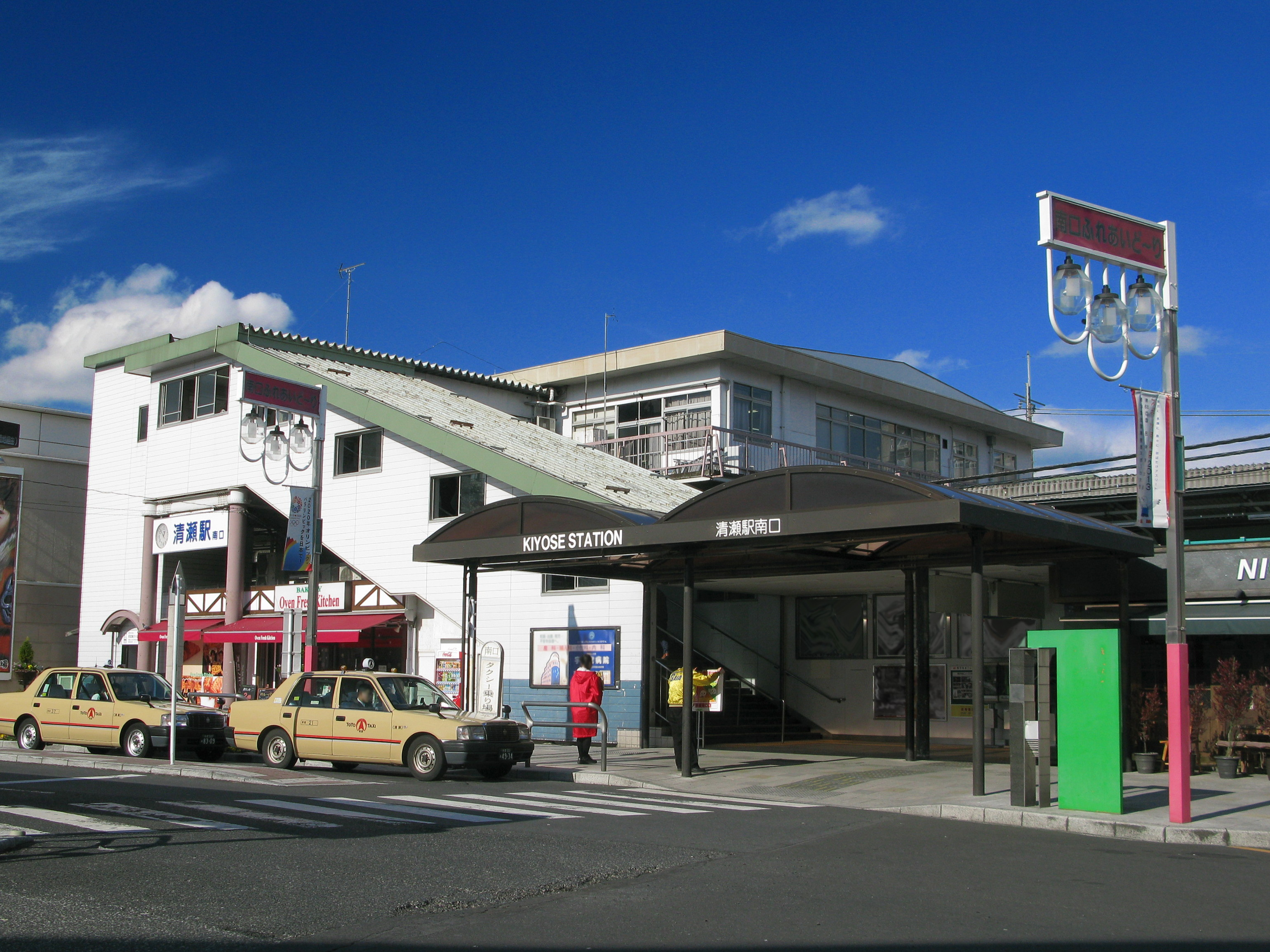
- South entrance, December 2012

General information
- Location: 1-2-4 Motomachi, Kiyose-shi, Tokyo-to 204-0021; Japan
- Coordinates: 35.7723°N 139.5197°E
- Operator: Seibu Railway
- Line: Seibu Ikebukuro Line
- Distance: 19.6 km from Ikebukuro
- Platforms: 2 island platforms

Other information
- Station code: SI15
- Website: Official website

History
- Opened: June 11, 1924

Passengers
- FY 2019: 69,578 daily

Services
Preceding station	Seibu Railway	Following station
Akitsu One-way operation	Ikebukuro Line Commuter Semi Express	Higashi-Kurume SI14 towards Ikebukuro
Akitsu SI16 towards Hannō	Ikebukuro Line Rapid Semi Express	Higashi-Kurume SI14 towards Ikebukuro
Akitsu SI16 towards Agano	Ikebukuro Line Local	Higashi-Kurume SI14 towards Ikebukuro
Location
- Location within Tokyo Location within Japan

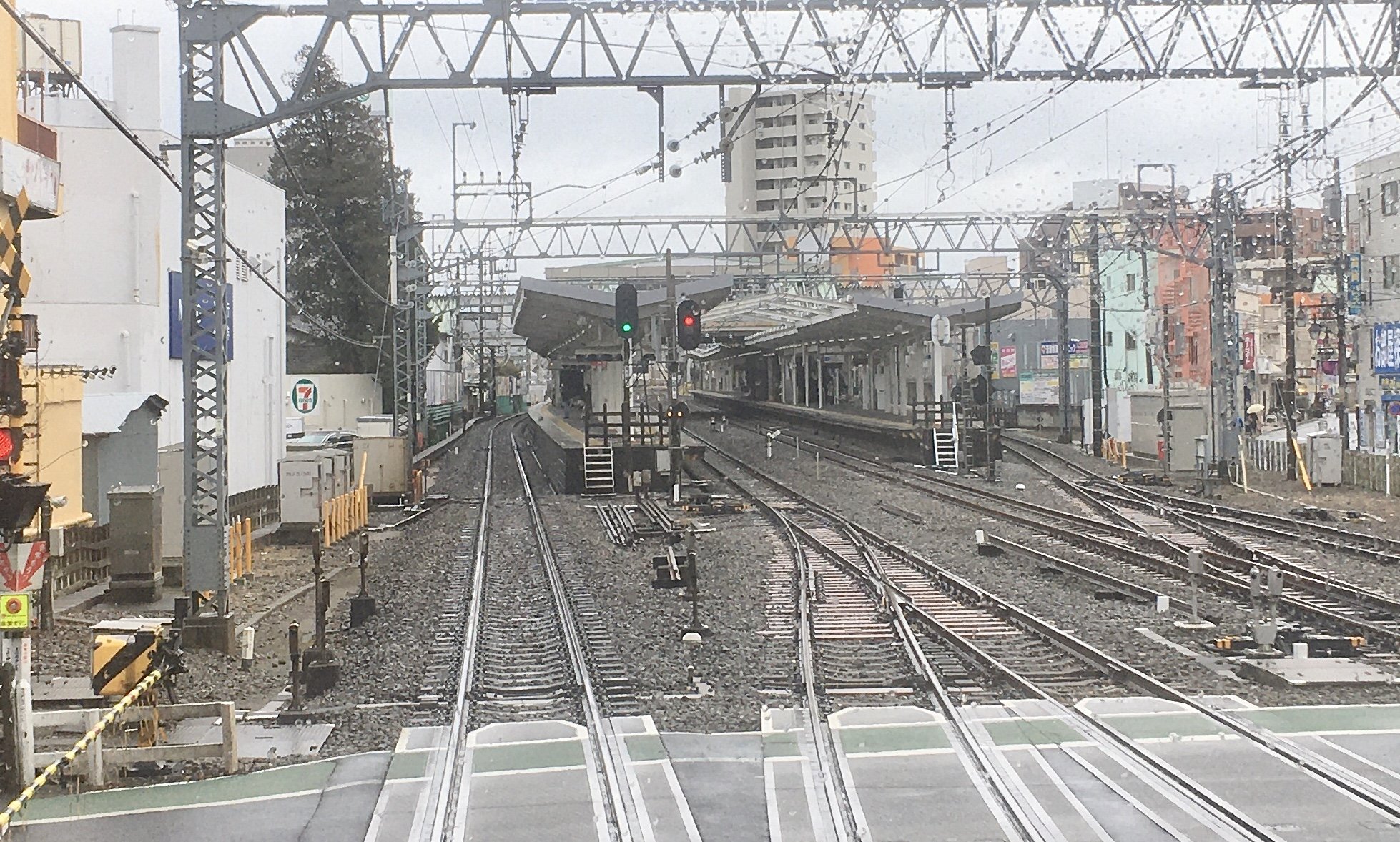
Station platforms, 2021

Kiyose Station (清瀬駅, Kiyose-eki) is a passenger railway station on the Seibu Ikebukuro Line located in the city of Kiyose, Tokyo, Japan, operated by the private railway operator Seibu Railway.

== Lines ==
Kiyose Station is served by the Seibu Ikebukuro Line from Ikebukuro in Tokyo, with some services inter-running via the Tokyo Metro Yurakucho Line to Shin-Kiba and the Tokyo Metro Fukutoshin Line to Shibuya and onward via the Tokyu Toyoko Line and Minato Mirai Line to Motomachi-Chukagai. Located between Higashi-Kurume and Akitsu, it is 19.6 km from the Ikebukuro terminus.

== Station layout ==
The station has two ground-level island platforms serving four tracks. A siding between the running tracks is located to the west of the station for services terminating and reversing at Kiyose.

=== Platforms ===
1/2	Seibu Ikebukuro Line	for Nerima and Ikebukuro; Tokyo Metro Yurakucho Line for Shin-Kiba; Tokyo Metro Fukutoshin Line for Shibuya; Tōkyū Tōyoko Line for Yokohama; Minatomirai Line for Motomachi-Chukagai
3/4	Seibu Ikebukuro Line	for Tokorozawa and Hannō

== History ==
The station opened on June 11, 1924.

Station numbering was introduced on all Seibu Railway lines during fiscal 2012, with Kiyose Station becoming "SI15".

Through-running to and from Yokohama and Motomachi-Chukagai via the Tokyu Toyoko Line and Minatomirai Line commenced on 16 March 2013.

== Passenger statistics ==
In fiscal 2019, the station was the 13th busiest on the Seibu network with an average of 69,578 passengers daily.

The passenger figures for previous years are as shown below.

Fiscal year	Daily average
2005	70,658
2010	68,945
2015	68,834

== Surrounding area ==
- Japanese Nursing Association Training Centre
- National College of Nursing
- Japan College of Social Work
- National Hospital Organization Tokyo National Hospital
- Tama Zenshoen Sanatorium
- Tokyo Metropolitan Kiyose High School

== See also ==
- List of railway stations in Japan
