= Breaking Away (disambiguation) =

Breaking Away is a 1979 film.

Breaking Away may also refer to:

- Breaking Away (TV series), a 1980 series based on the film
- Breaking Away (Tantrum album), 2005
- Breaking Away (Jaki Graham album), 1986 which includes a song of the same name
- Otryvayas (Breaking Away), an album by Mashina Vremeni
- "Breaking Away", a song by Ratatat from Ratatat
- "Breaking Away", a song by Status Quo from Whatever You Want

== See also ==
- Breakin' Away (disambiguation)
- Breakaway (disambiguation)
