= University of Kentucky College of Social Work =

College of Social Work of the University of Kentucky in Lexington, KY, USA

- Type: Public
- Established: 1969
- Parent institution: University of Kentucky
- Dean: Justin "Jay" Miller
- Location: Lexington, KY, USA; 38.0387°N 84.5042°W
- Website: https://socialwork.uky.edu

The University of Kentucky College of Social Work is the social work school of University of Kentucky. It was first established as in 1938 as the Department of Social Work within the university's College of Arts and Sciences. In 1969 the department became the separate College of Social Professions, and was given the current name in 1980.

== See also ==
List of social work schools
