= University of Georgia School of Social Work =

Coordinates: 33.9528825°N 83.3718912°W

- Established: 1964
- Parent institution: University of Georgia
- Dean: Philip Hong
- Academic staff: 40 full-time
- Undergraduates: 126
- Postgraduates: 257
- Location: Athens, Georgia, United States
- Website: http://www.ssw.uga.edu

The University of Georgia School of Social Work (SSW) is a college within the University of Georgia (UGA) in Athens, Georgia, United States.

The School of Social Work opened in 1964. The School is based in the School of Social Work building, adjacent to the university's North Campus. Courses are also offered on the university's Gwinnett campus.

== History ==
The University of Georgia was among the early institutions to grant a specialized degree in nonprofit management.

The School began granting the Ph.D. in Social Work in 1990, preparing social workers for careers in academic or evaluation research.

In 2012, The School of Social Work and the College of Public Health collaborated to offer a dual degree masters program.

== Interdisciplinary Centers and Institutes ==
=== Foot Soldier Project for Civil Rights Studies ===
Founded by former Dean Maurice Daniels, the Foot Soldier Project documents the work and lives of pivotal but unsung "foot soldiers" of the American civil rights movement. The project works to research, archive, and disseminate information about the lesser-known figures of the movement, and it is a collaborative of the School of Social Work and faculty from across UGA:

- Richard B. Russell Library for Political Research and Studies
- Institute for African American Studies
- African American Cultural Center
- Henry W. Grady College of Journalism and Mass Communication
- College of Education

== Rankings and reputation ==
As of 2024, it is ranked tied for 20th out of 319 schools for social work in the United States by U.S. News & World Report.

== See also ==
List of social work schools
