= Rutgers School of Social Work =

School of Rutgers University

Coordinates: 40.501388°N 74.446271°W

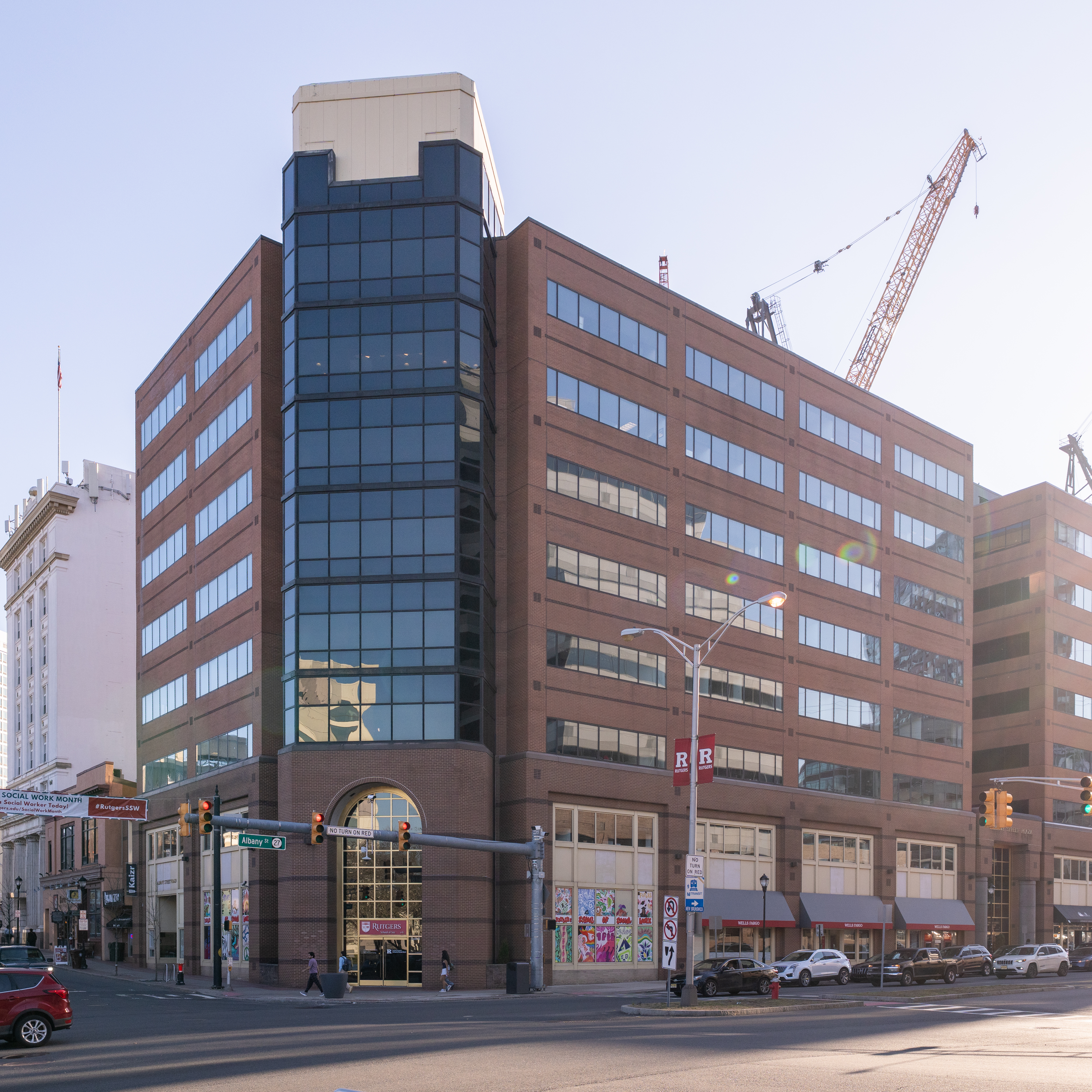
120 Albany St, New Brunswick, NJ 08901

The Rutgers School of Social Work (SSW) is one of the twenty-nine schools that makes up Rutgers University.

== Background & Programs ==
Established in 1954, the school today has more than 50 full-time faculty members and 150 part-time lecturers, and approximately 1,000 enrolled students. Classes are held at three Rutgers University campuses: Newark, New Brunswick and Camden.

In 2008, Verizon Wireless started a $100,000 scholarship fund to the Center on Violence Against Women and Children at the School of Social Work. It was to be awarded annually to three graduate students specializing at the center.

The school includes several research centers, including the Center for Gambling Studies, the Center for International Social Work, the Center for Nonprofit Management and Governance, the Center on Violence Against Women and Children and the Institute for Families.

== Accreditation ==
The School is fully accredited by the Council on Social Work Education and is authorized to award master's and baccalaureate degrees in Social Work.

== Rankings and reputation ==
In 2024, U.S. News & World Report ranked it 12th of 319 for social work schools in the United States.

== See also ==
List of social work schools
