= Wayne State University School of Social Work =

Coordinates: 42°21′38.8″N 83°04′03.1″W

- Established: 1936
- Parent institution: Wayne State University
- Location: Detroit, Michigan, United States
- Website: socialwork.wayne.edu

Wayne State University School of Social Work is the graduate school for social work of Wayne State University.

== History ==
The school's history dates to an undergraduate courses in social work that was begun at Detroit City College in the 1920s. In 1931, the school's social work curriculum was formalized to include case work. In 1936, Wayne University established a School of Public Affairs and Social Work. The school's founding was approved the university's Board of Governors in 1935. The school's early curriculum included courses in assessments, governmental correspondence, municipal sanitation, personnel administration, abnormal psychology, government accounting, and municipal law.

In 1950, the public affairs program was moved to a new Department of Public Administration within the College of Liberal Arts, and the current School of Social Work emerged as a stand-alone school focused on social work.

The school was initially housed at the Williams House, where Gov. G. Mennen Williams was born. The Williams House was demolished in 1956.

In 1971, the school's black students and faculty requested a separate program for black students. The faculty approved the request, triggering protests from a white faculty member who argued that the separate program "amounts to the use of public money for segregated facilities."

Wayne State University has maintained accreditation from the Accreditation Commission of Social Work Education since 1975.

In March 1981, the School celebrated the golden jubilee of social work education at Wayne State.

In 1990, the School of Social Work purchased the Thompson Home for Old Ladies, a landmark building located at the corner of Cass and Hancock in Detroit. The Italio-Victorian building, completed in 1884, was renovated by the school and has housed the school for more than 20 years. The Thompson House was slated to be converted into student housing in 2016.

== Rankings and reputation ==
In 2024, the school was ranked 36th out of 319 for social work by the U.S. News & World Report.

== See also ==
List of social work schools
