= Breakin' Away =

Breakin' Away may refer to:

- Breakin' Away (album), a 1981 album by Al Jarreau
- "Breakin' Away" (Joe Fagin song), a song performed by Joe Fagin for the TV comedy-drama Auf Wiedersehen, Pet
- "Breakin' Away" (song), a 1995 song by Kim Wilde

== See also ==
- Breaking Away (disambiguation)
