= Institute for Clinical Social Work =

Coordinates: 41°52′34.7″N 87°37′37.9″W

- Type: Private
- Established: 1981
- President: Milka Ramírez
- Dean: Denise Duval-Tsioles
- Postgraduates: 130
- Location: Chicago, Illinois, United States
- Website: www.icsw.edu

The Institute for Clinical Social Work (ICSW) is an independent educational institution in Chicago, Illinois, that provides practicing clinical social workers and other psychotherapists the opportunity to earn an MA or Ph.D. without taking a break from their professional pursuits. ICSW was established in 1981 and comprises more than 40 faculty members, 110 students, and 150 graduates.

== Academics ==
The Institute for Clinical Social Work is fully accredited by the Higher Learning Commission.

== See also ==
- List of social work schools
