= Taki-no Castle =

Building in Tokorozawa, Saitama Prefecture, Japan

Taki-no-jō 滝の城
- Tokorozawa, Saitama Prefecture, Japan
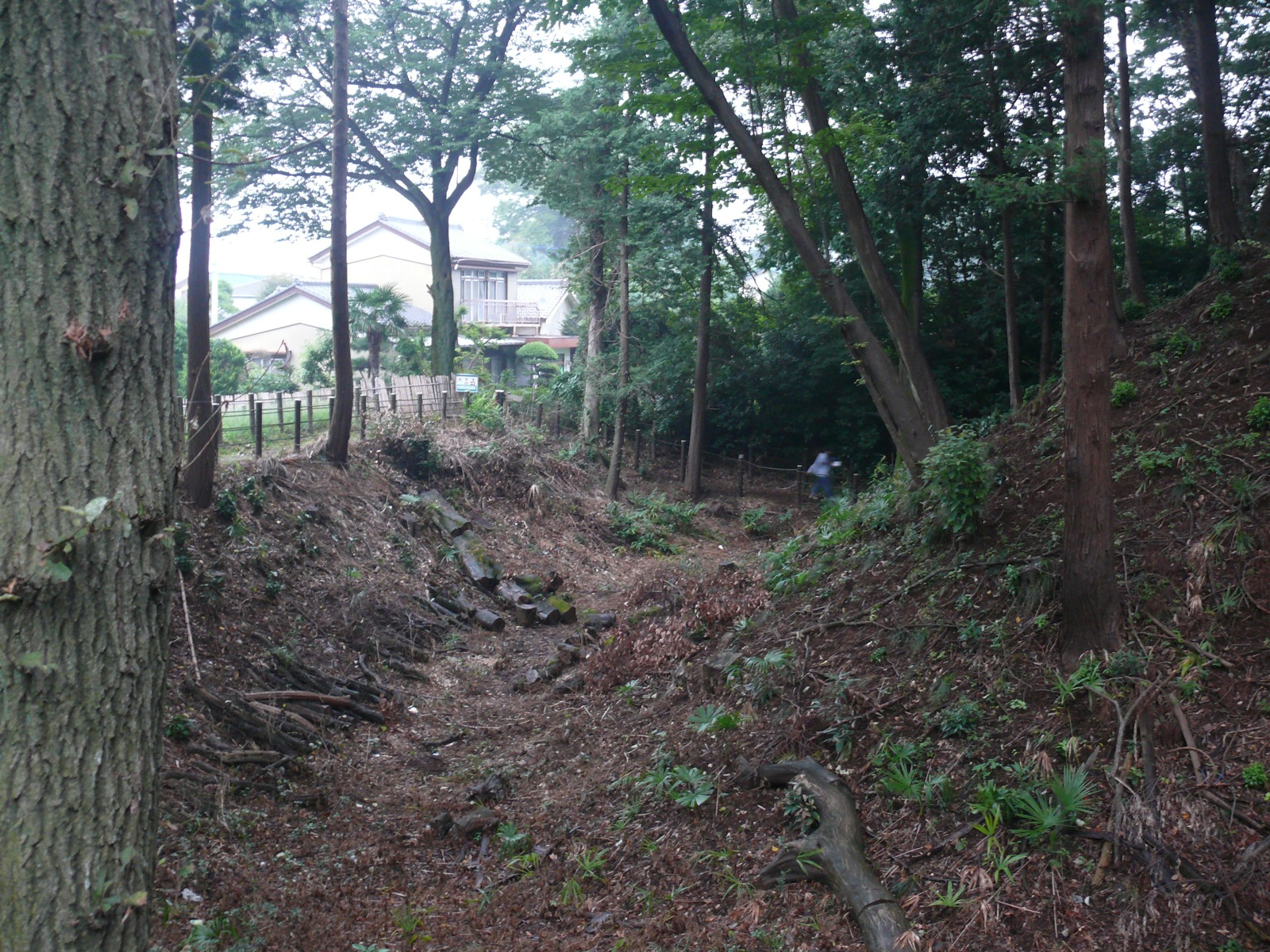
- Taki-no-jō Castle's dry moat

Site information
- Type: Japanese castle
- Controlled by: Oishi clan
- Condition: Ruins

Location
- Coordinates: 35°48′02″N 139°31′54″E

Site history
- Built: Sengoku Period
- Built by: Ōishi Sadahisa
- Demolished: 1590

Taki-no Castle (滝の城, Taki-no-jō; literally means "waterfall castle") is a flatland-hilltop Japanese castle ruin located in Tokorozawa, Saitama Prefecture. It was on a key route between the northern Kanto Plain and Hachioji.

The most recent structure was built in the 15th century by Ōishi Sadahisa and existed during the 16th-century Sengoku period of Japanese history. In 1546, the Hojo of Odawara took control and in 1569 possession passed to the Takeda. Then Go-Hōjō clan expanded and improved the defences of the castle.

After 1590, the castle was abandoned simultaneously with the arrival of Tokugawa Ieyasu into the region, having outlived its purpose.

The castle is now a ruin, with clear archeological evidence of the foundations of a number buildings and a dry moat. The castle name "Taki-no-jō", which literally means "waterfall castle", is due to a waterfall that exists on the eastern part of the castle grounds. The castle grounds now form a recreational park including walking paths, a children's play area and a baseball field. The park is called Taki-no-jō Castle Site Park (滝の城址公園, Taki-no-jō-shi Kōen).

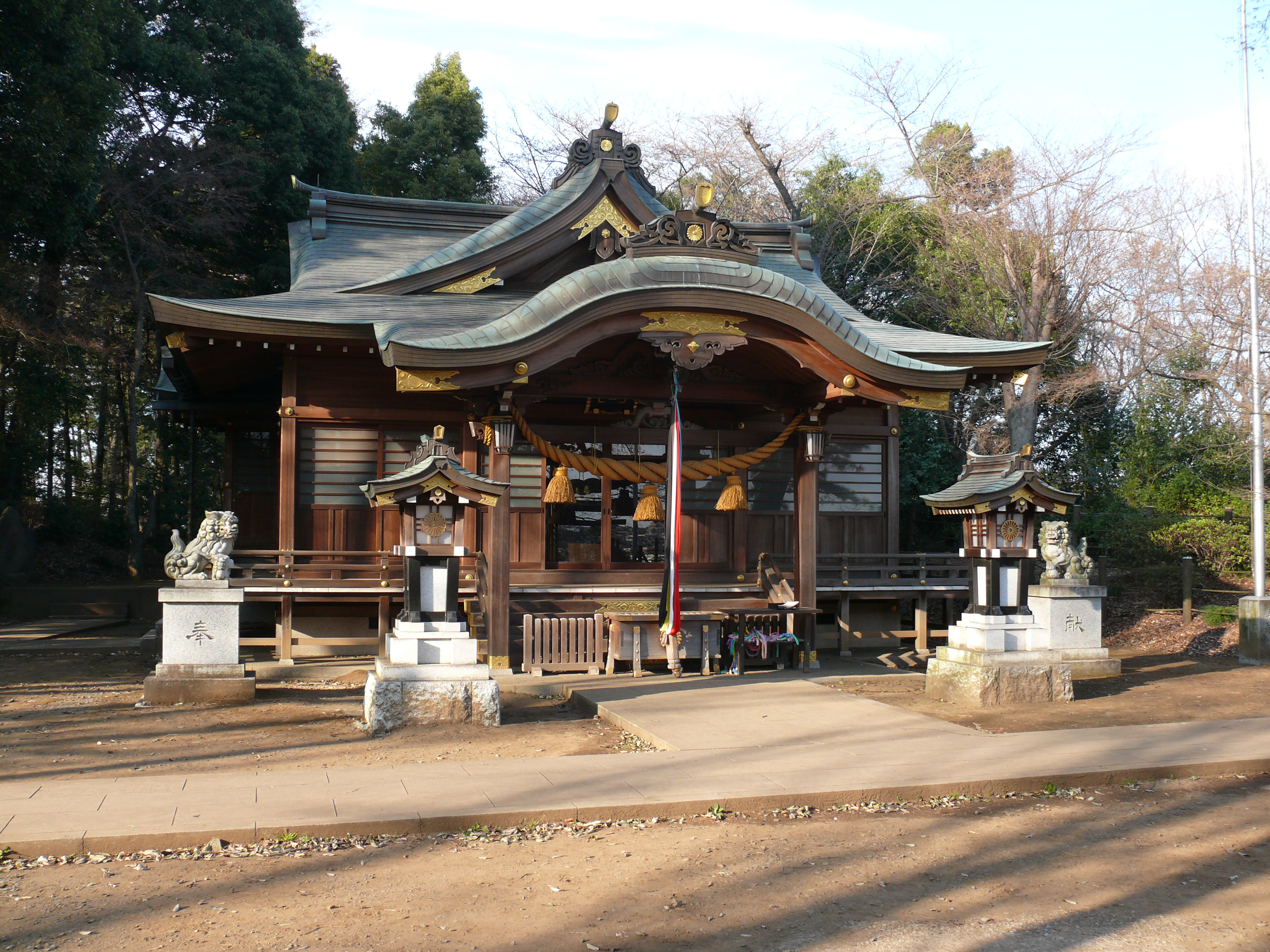
Shrine at the summit. Site of the honmaru main citadel

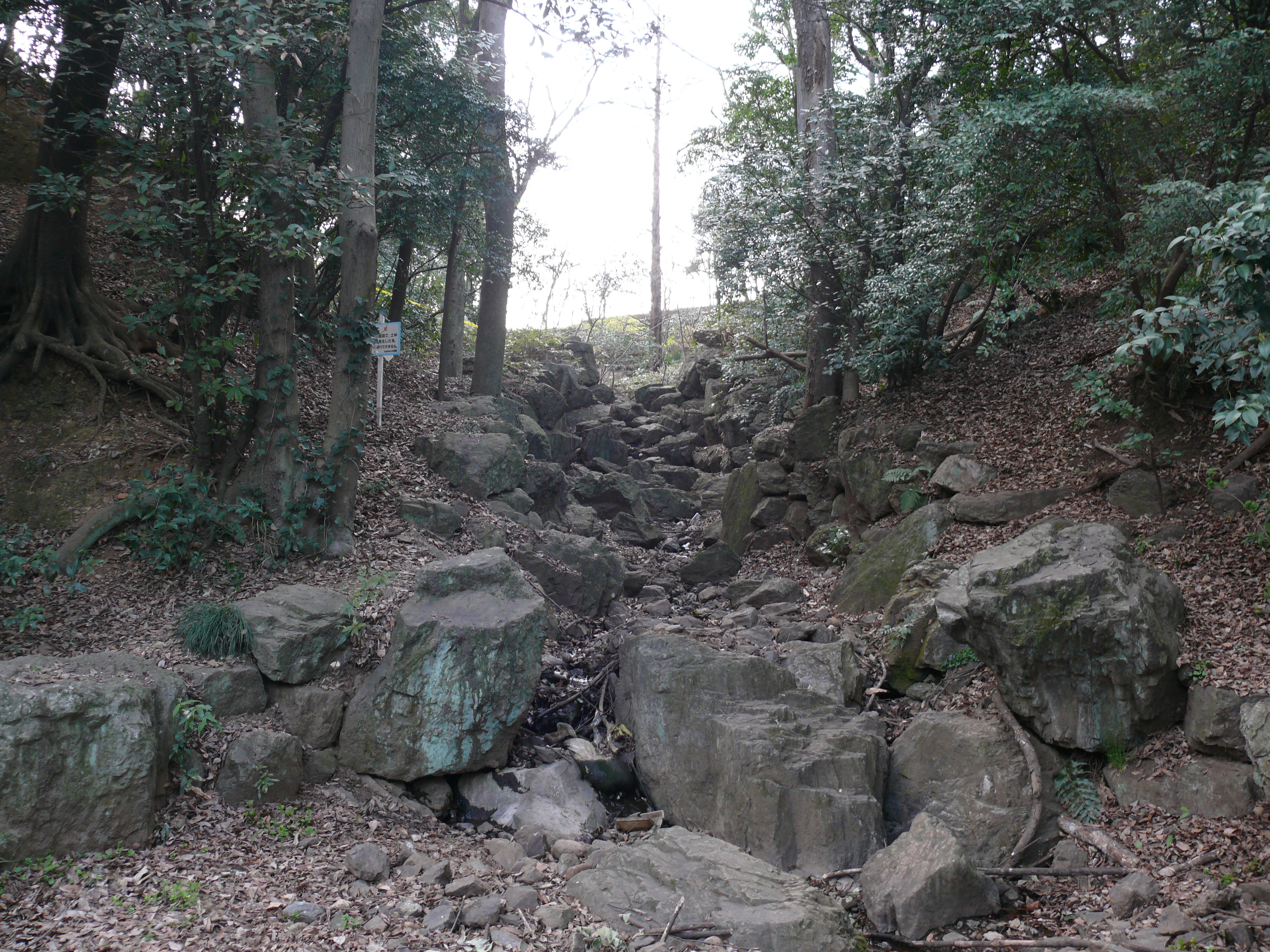
Creek and waterfall from which the castle was named.
