= Break Away (organization) =

Break Away is a national nonprofit organization that promotes the development of quality alternative break programs through training, assisting, and connecting campuses and communities. The organization has chapters on about 200 college campuses throughout the United States. Break Away holds training sessions for directors at each chapter school, who then train the student leaders and participants. An alternative break consists of a group of college students who serve a community with a focus on a specific social issue for a specific amount of time, whether it is a weekend or a week. Most trips are weeklong trips, with the majority over college spring breaks. 60% of trips occur over spring breaks and 15% occur over winter breaks. The social issue pertains to the community to which the group goes. Break Away emphasizes service-learning in which group members learn about the community they will be serving and how to avoid voluntourism. Break Away encourages student leaders, with each trip consisting of student leaders, student participants, a partner organization, and most of the time, a learning partner. By emphasizing the Active Citizenship Continuum and the Eight Components of a Quality Alternative Break, Break Away hopes to produce valuable alternative breaks, which will then lead participants to become more aware and active in their community. Break Away has about 200 chapter schools, more than 500 nonprofit partnerships, and thousands of participants and alumni worldwide. Just in 2014, there were a total of 1,551 trips with over 20,000 participants, which equates to over 1 million hours of service. Of the 1,551 trips in 2014, 1,334 were domestic and 251 were international.

== History ==
Two students, Michael Magevney and Laura Mann, founded Break Away in June 1991 at Vanderbilt University after the creation of Alternative Spring Break on the campus in 1987. While still at Vanderbilt University, the organization was funded by the chancellor's discretionary fund. In 2000, the organization expanded to Florida State University where it was housed by the Center for Civic Education and Service. In 2007, Break Away headquarters moved to Atlanta, Georgia where it shared a space with Hands On Network/Points of Light, which also had a goal of creating volunteer opportunities but for recent college graduates and alternative break alumni. The growth of Break Away accelerated considerably, around 20%, in the mid-2000s after Hurricane Katrina in the Gulf Coast. In 2010, the organization saw another acceleration, this time in terms of international trips. With the early 2010 earthquake in Haiti, the organization created the Haiti Compact with five American colleges – American University, the College of William and Mary, Indiana University, Loyola Marymount University, and the University of Maryland – which organized trips to the country. The Compact sought to develop the best practice for international alternative breaks, specifically in aiding participants in overcoming potential harm to the community, while also increasing service-learning. The College of William and Mary originally committed to serving in Haiti for four years following the 2010 earthquake, but since they have extended it to eight. In 2011, Break Away struck out on their own again, although their offices remain in the Atlanta area—and are still cubicle-free.

The organization has an annual budget of $160,000, which is mainly funded through chapter membership dues. Each year, the organization holds about 20 two-day retreats on college campuses to educate on fundraising, conflict resolution, and group building, which are attended by chapter directors and leaders. They also hold Alternative Break Citizen Schools, ABCs, which are weeklong leadership training sessions for students who lead their college’s Break Away chapter.

== Active Citizenship ==
The Active Citizen Continuum is the driving force behind Break Away. The goal for each person is to become an Active Citizen, which is achieved by going through each of the steps. Every person begins as a Member, someone who is not concerned with their role in social problems. A Member then becomes a Volunteer, someone who is well intentioned but not well educated about social issues, through exposure. That Volunteer starts to get an understanding for a particular social issue and becomes a Conscientious Citizen, someone who is concerned with discovering root causes and asks why. Finally, that Conscientious Citizen begins to take action and becomes an Active Citizen, someone who prioritizes the community and social issue into their values and life choices. The aim for the Active Citizen Continuum is to create citizens that are aware of social issues in the world and who commit to resolving those issues.

== Eight Components of a Quality Alternative Break ==
All components are equally important in order to create the best alternative break trips as possible.

1. Strong Direct Service: Trips provide an opportunity for interaction and hands-on activities with a community.
2. Alcohol and Drug-Free: This allows for group cohesion and development.
3. Diversity and Social Justice: Not only do the communities in which the trips will occur embody diversity, the students who make up the groups do as well.
4. Orientation: Before leaving for their trip, each group discusses the issue and learns about the community and the organization that they will be working with.
5. Education: To go along with the emphasis of service-learning, members are educated on the social issue of their community and how their community and lives are associated to it as well.
6. Training: Members learn basic skills to complete the tasks given to them by the organizations they work with in the community, such as learning how to use a handsaw.
7. Reflection: This piece occurs during the trip, when leaders and members are encouraged to discuss their experiences to promote group cohesion and understanding.
8. Reorientation: This piece occurs after the trip, in which group members are encouraged to take what they learned from their experiences on their trip and put them into place in their own community by finding organizations that relate to the social issue of their trip.

== Voluntourism ==
One of Break Away’s goals is to avoid voluntourism or volunteer tourism, which is a form of tourism in which travelers participate in volunteer work. By incorporating the service-learning aspect of alternative breaks, participants are able to learn about the community they will be serving prior to their arrival, which decreases the chances of tourism. Voluntourism can have the opposite effect of its intended purpose of helping a community, instead, it has been shown to generate potential harm to a community. For instance, in an orphanage in Cambodia, the presence of wealthy volunteers has slowed the market for adopting the orphans in the town. Through Break Away, participants are able to learn about the culture and the social issues within a specific community before their departure, which allows them to understand the community better.

== Membership ==
With around 200 chapters countrywide, Break Away has two levels of membership. The first level of membership is Associate, which has an annual fee of $350 and includes SiteBank access, ongoing Break Away consultation, access to resources, listing as an Associate Chapter, forum access, and 10% discount on trainings and products. The highest level of membership is Advantage, which is $700 per year and includes everything that Associate offers, as well as listing as an Advantage Chapter, 20% discount on trainings and products and one free Alternative Break Citizen School registration.

Institution	Type
Agnes Scott College	Advantage
Alma College	Advantage
Alvernia University	Associate
American University	Advantage
Appalachian State University	Advantage
Arizona State University	Associate
Auburn University	Associate
Baldwin-Wallace College	Associate
Benedict College	Associate
Black Hills State University	Advantage
Bowdoin College	Associate
Bowling Green State University	Advantage
Bradley University	Associate
Bridgewater State University	Associate
Buena Vista University	Advantage
Butler University	Advantage
California Lutheran University	Associate
Carroll University	Advantage
Central Michigan University	Advantage
Charleston Southern University	Associate
Christopher Newport University	Associate
Claflin University	Associate
Clemson University	Associate
Cleveland State University	Associate
Coastal Carolina University	Associate
College of Charleston	Associate
College of William & Mary	Advantage
Colorado State University	Associate
Columbia University	Associate
Community College of Baltimore County	Advantage
Converse College	Associate
Cornell College	Associate
Davenport University	Advantage
Davidson College	Associate
Denison University	Associate
Drury University	Associate
East Tennessee State University	Associate
Eastern Kentucky University	Associate
Eastern Michigan University	Advantage
Elon University	Associate
Embry–Riddle Aeronautical University	Associate
Florida Atlantic University	Advantage
Florida International University	Associate
Florida State University	Advantage
Framingham State University	Associate
George Mason University	Advantage
Georgia Southern University	Advantage
Gettysburg College	Advantage
Goucher College	Associate
Grand Valley State University	Advantage
Greenville Technical College	Associate
Hamline University	Advantage
Harper College	Associate
Heartland Community College	Associate
Illinois State University	Advantage
Indiana State University	Associate
Indiana University	Associate
Iowa State University	Advantage
James Madison University	Advantage
Johnson State College	Advantage
Juniata College	Associate
Kansas State University	Associate
Keene State College	Associate
Kenyon College	Associate
La Salle University	Advantage
Lafayette College	Advantage
Lasell College	Associate
Lock Haven University	Associate
Lone Star College	Associate
Longwood University	Advantage
Loyola Marymount University	Advantage
Madison Area Technical College	Associate
Mansfield University	Associate
Massachusetts Institute of Technology	Associate
Massasoit Community College	Associate
Miami Dade College	Advantage
Michigan State University	Advantage
Middlebury College	Associate
Midlands Technical College	Associate
Millersville University	Associate
Missouri State University	Advantage
Missouri University of Science and Technology	Associate
Mitchell College	Associate
Montgomery College	Associate
Mott Community College	Associate
Mount Ida College	Associate
Naropa University	Associate
Nazareth College	Associate
New York University	Advantage
Newberry College	Associate
Northeastern Illinois University	Associate
Northern Arizona University	Associate
Northwest Missouri State University	Associate
Northwestern University	Associate
Ohio State University	Associate
Old Dominion University	Advantage
Pennsylvania State University	Associate
Pierce College	Associate
Presentation College	Associate
Princeton University	Advantage
Radford University	Associate
Ramapo College of New Jersey	Associate
Rice University	Advantage
Roanoke College	Associate
Rochester Institute of Technology	Associate
Rollins College	Associate
Rowan University	Associate
Rutgers University	Associate
Saginaw Valley State University	Associate
Salt Lake Community College	Associate
Sam Houston State University	Associate
Santa Fe College	Associate
Skidmore College	Associate
Snow College	Associate
Sonoma State University	Advantage
Southern Illinois University Edwardsville	Associate
Southern Methodist University	Advantage
Southern New Hampshire University	Advantage
Southern Polytechnic State University	Associate
Southern Utah University	Associate
Southwestern University	Associate
St. Norbert College	Advantage
Stanford University	Associate
Stony Brook University	Associate
SUNY Buffalo State	Advantage
Temple University	Associate
Texas Tech University	Associate
The Citadel, The Military College of South Carolina	Associate
Towson University	Associate
Transylvania University	Advantage
Tulane University	Advantage
University of Alabama	Advantage
University of Alabama in Huntsville	Associate
University of Alabama at Birmingham	Associate
University of Alaska Fairbanks	Associate
University of Arizona	Advantage
University of Baltimore	Associate
University of California, San Diego	Associate
University of Central Florida	Advantage
University of Central Oklahoma	Advantage
University of Colorado Boulder	Advantage
University of Colorado Denver	Associate
University of Connecticut	Advantage
University of Delaware	Advantage
University of Florida	Advantage
University of Georgia	Advantage
University of Idaho	Advantage
University of Iowa	Associate
University of Kentucky	Advantage
University of Louisville	Advantage
University of Maine	Advantage
University of Maryland	Advantage
University of Massachusetts Amherst	Associate
University of Massachusetts Boston	Associate
University of Miami	Advantage
University of Michigan	Associate
University of Michigan–Dearborn	Associate
University of Missouri	Associate
University of Nevada, Las Vegas	Associate
University of North Alabama	Associate
University of North Carolina at Greensboro	Associate
University of North Carolina Wilmington	Associate
University of North Florida	Associate
University of Northern Colorado	Advantage
University of Oregon	Advantage
University of South Carolina	Associate
University of South Carolina Beaufort	Associate
University of South Carolina Upstate	Associate
University of South Dakota	Advantage
University of South Florida	Associate
University of South Florida St. Petersburg	Associate
University of Southern California	Associate
University of Tampa	Advantage
University of Tennessee, Knoxville	Associate
University of Texas at Arlington	Associate
University of Texas at Austin	Associate
University of Texas at Dallas	Associate
University of the Sciences	Associate
University of Utah	Advantage
University of Vermont	Associate
University of Washington Tacoma	Associate
University of Wisconsin–Stevens Point	Associate
University of Wisconsin–River Falls	Associate
Utah State University	Associate
Utah Tech University (formerly Dixie State University)	Associate
Utah Valley University	Associate
Vanderbilt University	Advantage
Vincennes University	Associate
Virginia Commonwealth University	Advantage
Virginia Tech	Advantage
Warren Wilson College	Associate
Wartburg College	Advantage
Washington University in St. Louis	Associate
Weber State University	Associate
Wellesley College	Advantage
West Chester University	Associate
Whitman College	Advantage
Widener University	Associate
Williams College	Associate
Winthrop University	Associate
Wofford College	Associate
Xavier University	Advantage
