= Ōishi (surname) =

Ōishi, Oishi or Ooishi is a Japanese surname. Notable people with the surname include:

- Daijiro Oishi (大石 大二郎; born 1958), Japanese baseball player
- Hisako Ōishi (大石 尚子; born 1936), Japanese politician of the Democratic Party of Japan
- Makoto Oishi (大石 真翔; born 1979), Japanese professional wrestler
- Masamitsu Oishi (大石 正光; born 1945), Japanese politician of the Democratic Party of Japan
- Nobuyuki Oishi (大石 信幸; born 1939), former Japanese football player
- Ryuhei Oishi (大石 竜平; born 1997), Japanese footballer
- Sadahisa Ōishi (大石 定久; fl. 1545), retainer of the Ogigayatsu-Uesugi branch of the Uesugi, and the builder of Takiyama Castle
- Tadashi Ōishi (大石 直嗣; born 1989), Japanese shogi player
- Tamotsu Oishi (大石 保; 1900–1946), career officer in the Imperial Japanese Navy during World War II
- Tsugutoshi Oishi (大石 治寿; born 1990), Japanese footballer
- Yasuko Oishi (大石 康子; born 1931), Japanese swimmer
- Yoshino Ōishi (大石 芳野; born 1944), Japanese photographer
- Yoshio Ōishi (大石 良雄; 1659–1703), the chamberlain of the Akō han in Harima Province, Japan (1679–1701), known as the leader of the forty-seven rōnin

== Fictional characters ==
- Hisako Ōishi, a Japanese schoolteacher in the 1952 novel Twenty-Four Eyes and the 1954 film adaptation of the same name
- Noriko Ōishi, a central character in the 2023 film Godzilla Minus One
