= Kiyose =

Kiyose 清瀬市
- City
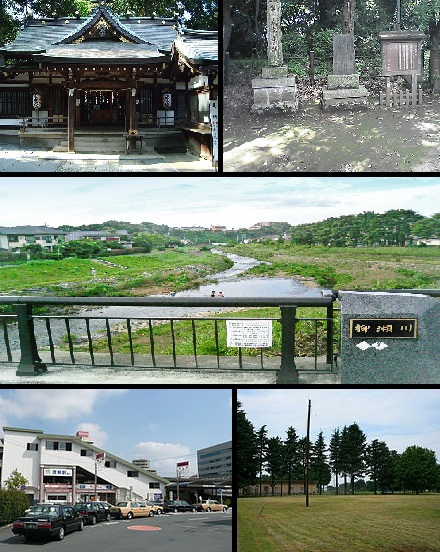
- top: Suitengū Shrine, site of Taki-no-Jo middle: Yanase River bottom: Kiyose Station, Owada Transmitter

- Flag Seal

- Location of Kiyose in Tokyo Metropolis

- Location within Japan
- Coordinates: 35°47′8.6″N 139°31′35.3″E
- Country: Japan
- Region: Kantō
- Prefecture: Tokyo
- Village settled: April 1, 1889
- Town settled: April 5, 1954
- City settled: October 1, 1970

Government
  - Mayor: Hiromi Harade (原田博美) - from April 2026

Area
  - Total: 10.23 km^{2} (3.95 sq mi)

Population (April 2021)
  - Total: 74,972
  - Density: 7,329/km^{2} (18,980/sq mi)
- Time zone: UTC+9 (Japan Standard Time)
- Tree: Zelkova serrata
- Flower: Camellia sasanqua
- Bird: Azure-winged magpie
- Phone number: 042-492-5111
- Address: 5-842 Nakasato, Kiyose-shi, Tokyo-to 204-8511
- Website: Official website

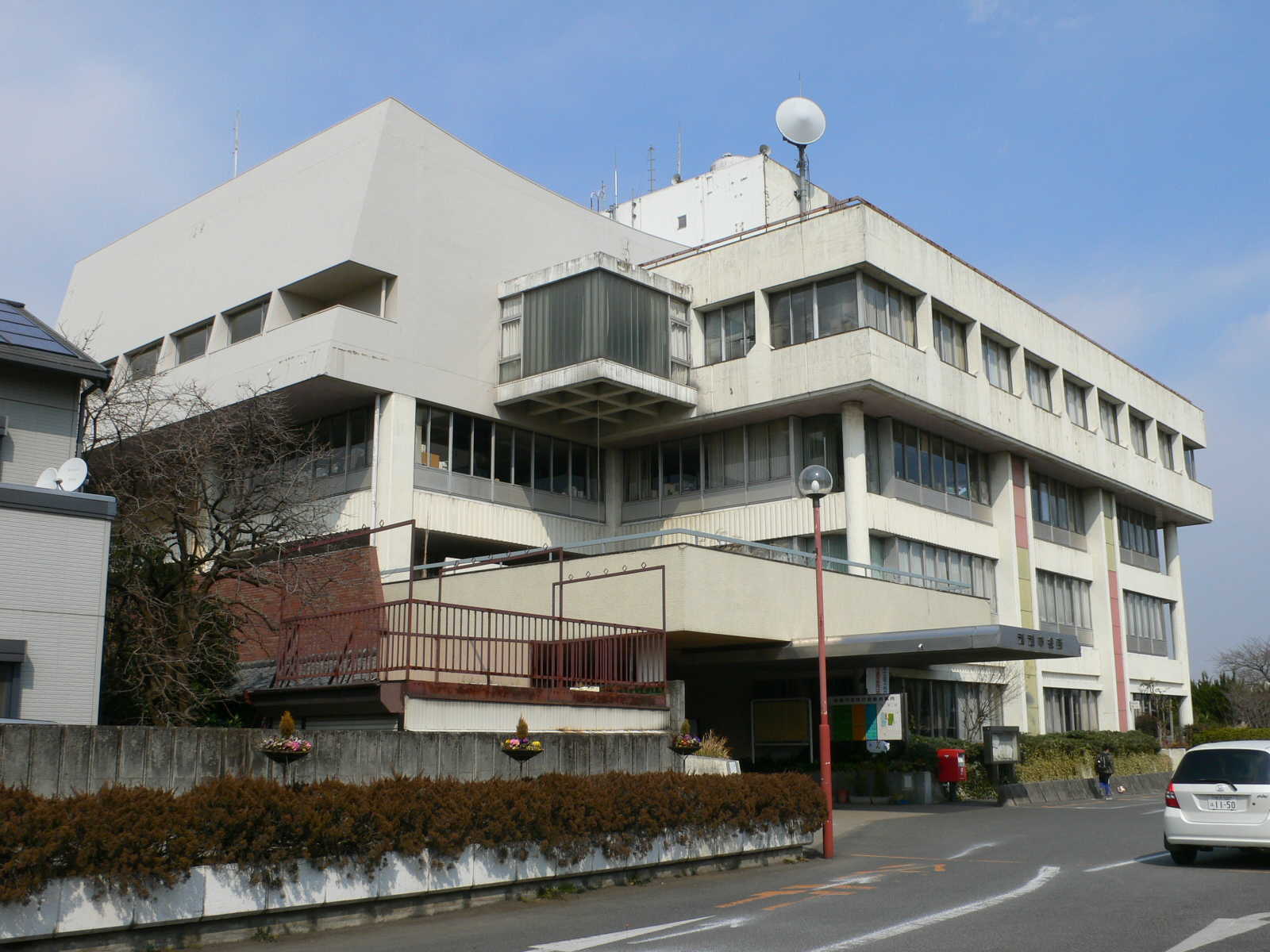
Kiyose City Hall

Kiyose (清瀬市, Kiyose-shi) is a city located in the west of the Tokyo Metropolis, Japan. As of 1 April 2021, the city had an estimated population of 74,972 in 36,376 households, and a population density of 7300 persons per km^{2}. The total area of the city was 10.23 square kilometres (3.95 sq mi).

== Geography ==
Kiyose City is roughly in the shape of a wedge, bordered by Saitama Prefecture to the north, east and south and separated from the city of Tokorozawa by the Yanase River. The city has considerable green space, with around 46% of its area remaining rural.

Kiyose is located on a flat tableland about 15 km from the northeastern edge of Musashino Plateau. The city measures approximately 6.5 km northeast to southwest and 2 km northwest to southeast, with the west side slightly higher than the east. Average altitude above sea level ranges from 65 meters at Takeoka in the west to 20 meters at Shitajuku in the northeastern side. The city area is mostly diluvial soil except for a small area of alluvial soil by Yanase River, which runs on the edge of the region.

=== Surrounding municipalities ===
Tokyo Metropolis

- Higashikurume
- Higashimurayama

Saitama Prefecture

- Niiza
- Tokorozawa

=== Climate ===
Kiyose has a humid subtropical climate (Köppen Cfa) characterized by warm summers and cool winters with light to no snowfall. The average annual temperature in Kiyose is 14.0 °C. The average annual rainfall is 1647 mm with September as the wettest month. The temperatures are highest on average in August, at around 25.7 °C, and lowest in January, at around 2.3 °C.

== Demographics ==
Per Japanese census data, the population of Kiyose increased rapidly in the 1950s and 1960s with the development of many large-scale public housing projects, and has continued to grow at a slower rate in the decades since.

Historical population
| Year | Pop. | ±% |
|---|---|---|
| 1920 | 3,083 | — |
| 1930 | 3,584 | +16.3% |
| 1940 | 7,203 | +101.0% |
| 1950 | 11,610 | +61.2% |
| 1960 | 17,863 | +53.9% |
| 1970 | 51,911 | +190.6% |
| 1980 | 63,913 | +23.1% |
| 1990 | 67,539 | +5.7% |
| 2000 | 68,037 | +0.7% |
| 2010 | 74,104 | +8.9% |
| 2020 | 76,208 | +2.8% |

== History ==
Archaeologists have found evidence of human settlement in the Kiyose area dating from over 20 thousand years ago, during the last glacial maximum. During the Muromachi period, the area came under the control of Oishi Nobushige (大石 信重) from Saku in Shinano Province (now Nagano Prefecture). The Oishi clan constructed Taki-no-Jo Castle, but it was lost during battles with Toyotomi Hideyoshi.

The village of Kiyose was created within Kitatama District, Kanagawa by the merger of the hamlets of Kamikiyoto (上清戸), Nakakiyoto (中清戸), Shimokiyoto (下清戸), Kiyotoshitajuku (清戸下宿), Nakazato (中里), and Noshio (野塩) with the establishment of the modern municipalities system on April 1, 1889. In 1893, Kitatama was transferred from Kanagawa Prefecture to Tokyo. In 1954, Kiyose was elevated to town status and to city status on October 1, 1970.

Kiyose was noted for many sanatoria for tuberculosis patients. Whilst the incidence of the disease has greatly decreased, the city still has the second-most hospital beds after Chiyoda Ward.

== Government ==
Kiyose has a mayor-council form of government with a directly elected mayor and a unicameral city council of 20 members. Kiyose, together with Higashikurume, contributes two members to the Tokyo Metropolitan Assembly. In terms of national politics, the city is part of Tokyo 20th district of the lower house of the Diet of Japan.

== Economy ==
Kiyose is largely a bedroom community, with over a third of its workforce commuting to central Tokyo every day. However, approximately 40% of the city's land area remains classified as agricultural, with spinach and carrots as the main crops.

== Education ==
Tertiary:

- Meiji Pharmaceutical University
- Japan College of Social Work

Tokyo Metropolitan Board of Education operates Kiyose High School.

Kiyose has nine public elementary schools and five public junior high schools operated by the municipality.

Public junior high schools:

- Kiyose (清瀬中学校)
- Kiyose No. 2 (清瀬第二中学校)
- Kiyose No. 3 (清瀬第三中学校)
- Kiyose No. 4 (清瀬第四中学校)
- Kiyose No. 5 (清瀬第五中学校)

Public elementary schools:

- Kiyose (清瀬小学校)
- Kiyose No. 3 (清瀬第三小学校)
- Kiyose No. 4 (清瀬第四小学校)
- Kiyose No. 6 (清瀬第六小学校)
- Kiyose No. 7 (清瀬第七小学校)
- Kiyose No. 8 (清瀬第八小学校)
- Kiyose No. 10 (清瀬第十小学校)
- Seimei (清明小学校)
- Shibayama (芝山小学校)

Kiyose has one private elementary school, one private junior high school, and one private high school.

== Transportation ==
=== Railway ===
Seibu Railway - Ikebukuro Line

- Kiyose

=== Highway ===
Kiyose is not served by any national highways.

== Local attractions ==
- Kiyose Suitengū Shrine

== Notable people from Kiyose ==
- Maki Horikita, actress
- Yukari Kawamoto, former rhythmic gymnast
- Akina Nakamori, actress, singer
- Ai Ogura, motorcycle racer
- Yumiko Shaku, actress, model
- Akane Yamao, rhythmic gymnast
