= School of Social Work, Odense – University College, Little Belt =

School in Odense, Denmark

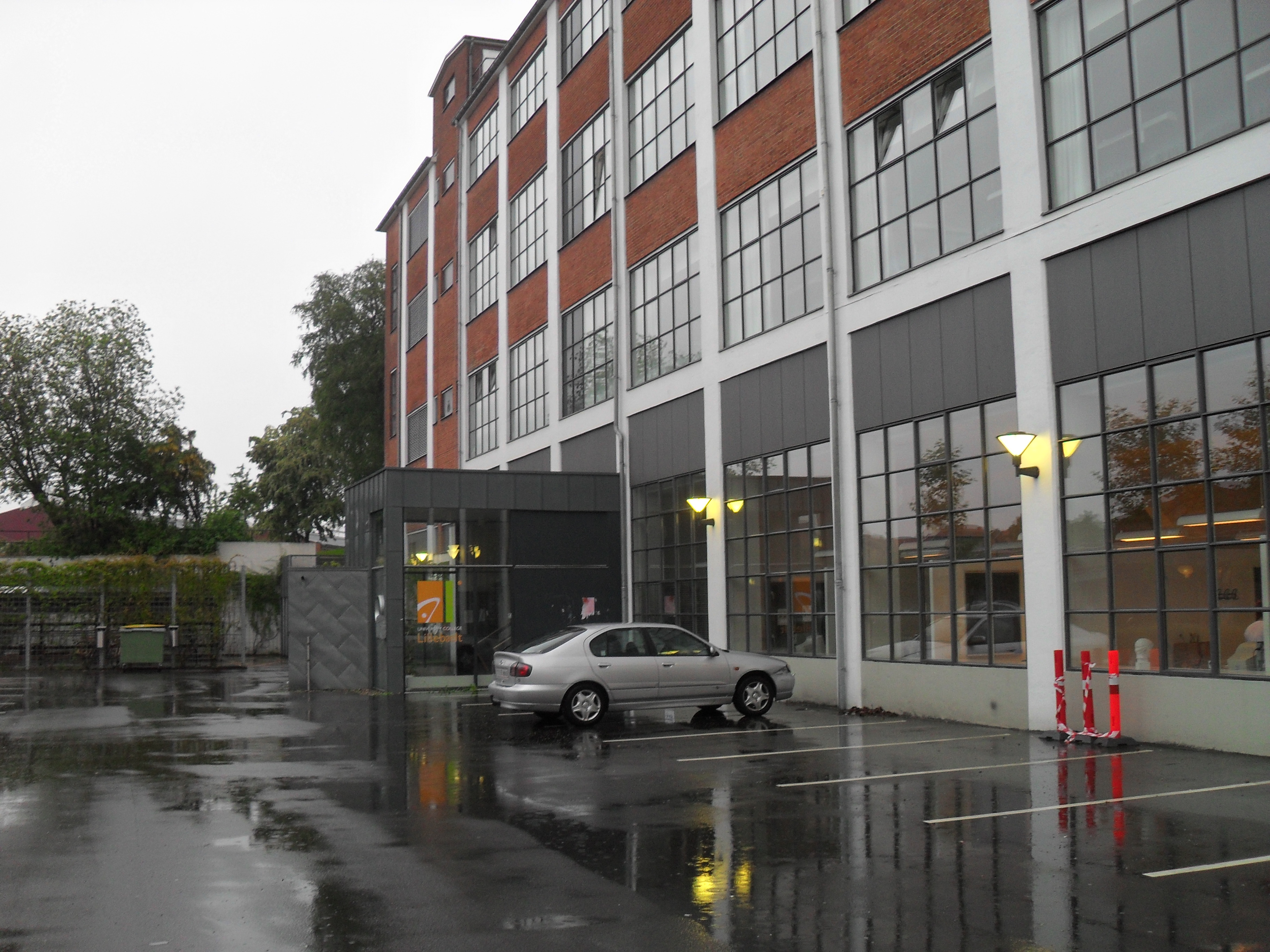
- Established: 1968
- Parent institution: UCL University College
- Rector: Alice Rasmussen
- Administrative staff: 100
- Students: 800
- Location: Odense, Denmark; 55°24′17″N 10°23′18″E
- Website: http://www.ucl.dk/dsh-o

The School of Social Work, Odense is the social work school of UCL University College, which is located at Tolderlundsvej number 5 in Odense. The college is in the Skibhus neighborhood (Danish: Skibhus kvarteret) near the Bazar Fyn and the old taxation house.

== The building at Tolderlundsvej ==
The current building at Tolderlundsvej was a part of the Thomas B. Thriges factories until 1996. After the building was sold by the Thrige fund to The School of Social Work, it went through a series of renovations. The institution merged into the University College, Little Belt with a varied number of courses.

The decoration of the building was by Danish artist Thomas Bang with support from the Danish State Arts Foundation. The building is open 24 hours. Access requires a valid student card or key card after normal school hours.

== See also ==
List of social work schools

== Sources ==
- "Socialrådgiver - University College Lillebælt". Ucl.dk.
- "Socialrådgiver - University College Lillebælt". Ucl.dk.
- "Administrationsbachelor - University College Lillebælt". Ucl.dk.
