= Breakaway Airport =

Airport in Texas, United States

- IATA: none; ICAO: 40XS

Summary
- Airport type: Private
- Owner/Operator: D&D Airport Holdings LLC
- Elevation AMSL: 897 ft (273 m)
- Coordinates: 30°31′04″N 97°46′51″W

Map
- Location in Texas

Runways
Direction	Length		Surface
Direction	ft	m	Surface
15/33	3,000	914.4	Asphalt
- Source: Federal Aviation Administration

Breakaway Airport, also known as Hank Sasser Airport, (ICAO: 40XS) is a privately owned, private use airport in Cedar Park, Texas, United States. Located about 3 miles (4.8 km) northeast of Downtown Cedar Park, it covers 25 acres (10.1 ha) and has one runway. It serves as the base for the fly-in community Breakaway Park.

== History ==
=== Founding ===
In 1977, United States Marine Corps veteran and amateur pilot Walter Yates purchased land for the purpose of establishing a fly-in community. This land would become Breakaway Park, a subdivision of the City of Cedar Park that featured a 3,000 foot (914.4 m) grass runway at its center. Initially, Breakaway would consist of the single unpaved runway and a handful of hangars near its northern end, but would see continuous development that continues to the present day. The subdivision would be managed by Breakaway Park, Incorporated, of which Yates was the president until the company's dissolution on March 26, 2001.

=== Modern History ===
On January 1, 2008, Breakaway Park fell under the management of residents Donald Richie and Dennis Gale, operating as D&D Airport Holdings LLC.

==== Runway Resurfacing ====
Over the years 2004 and 2005, Breakaway's grass runway would be paved over with asphalt, but its length and width would remain unchanged.

==== Name Change ====
In 2014, Breakaway Airport's name would be changed to Hank Sasser/Breakaway Airport in honor of amateur pilot John Henry "Hank" Sasser. He was a Cedar Park native that operated his personal aircraft out of Breakaway, and died in an airplane crash in Lago Vista, Texas on August 23, 2014.

== Facilities ==
Breakaway Airport offers fuel and oxygen services to residents of Breakaway Park. There are no air traffic control facilities on-site.

=== Runway and Hangars ===
Breakaway Airport has one runway. Hangars are located on either side of the runway, many of which are attached to private residences.

Runway	Length	Width	Pavement
15/22	3,000 ft 914.4 m	30 ft 9.1 m	Asphalt

== Statistics ==
As of December 2021, there are 23 aircraft based at Breakaway Airport.

Single-Engine Airplanes	Multi-Engine Airplanes	Total Aircraft
22	1	23
