= Japan College of Social Work =

Private university in Tokyo, Japan

Coordinates: 35°45′58.9″N 139°30′26.2″E

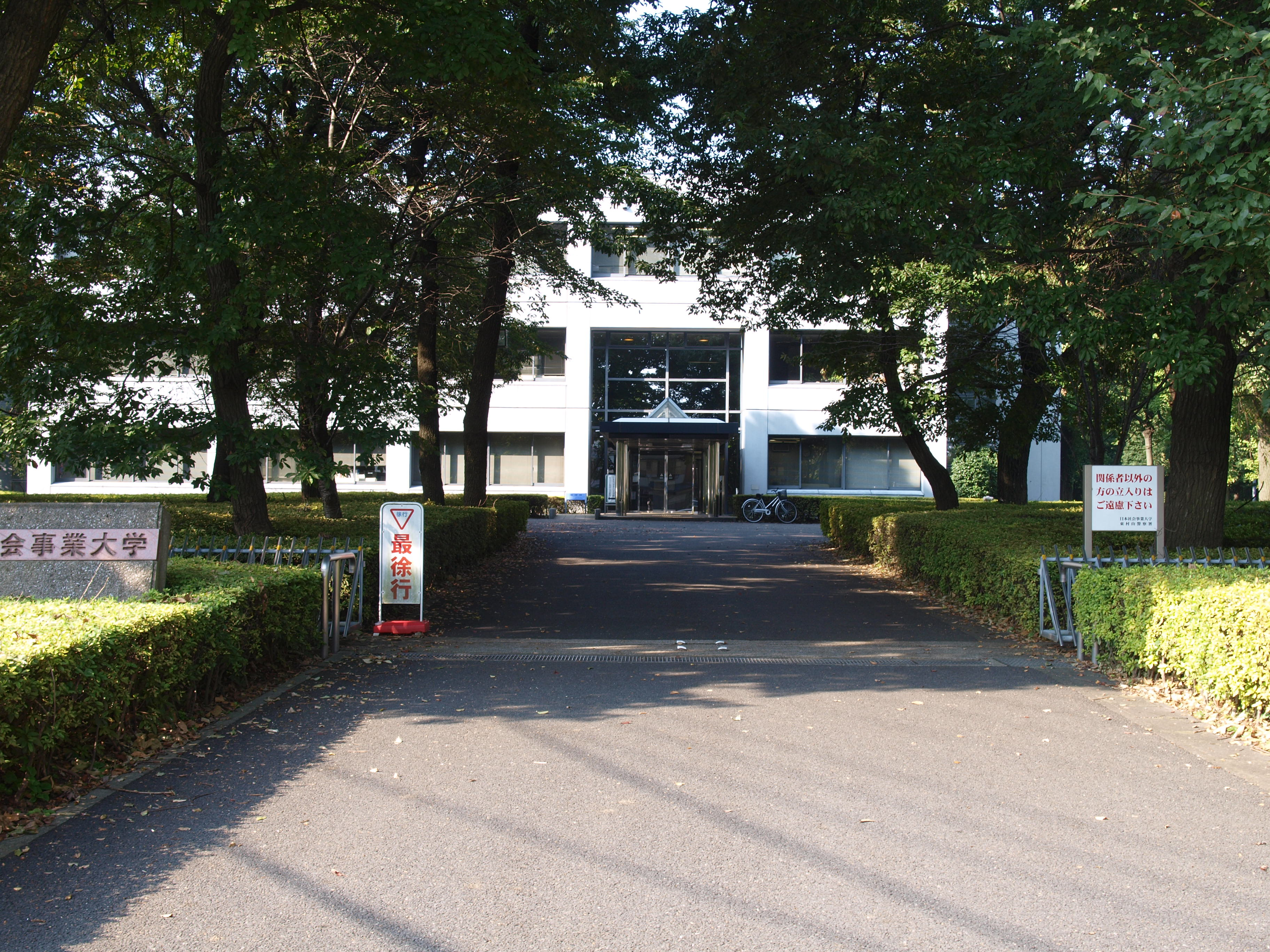
Japan College of Social Work

Japan College of Social Work (日本社会事業大学, Nihon shakai jigyō daigaku; JCSW) is a private university in Kiyose, Tokyo, Japan, established in 1958. Formerly the JCSW was called Japan School of Social Work and established by the GHQ (General Headquarters), Supreme Commander for the Allied Powers and the Ministry of Health, Labour and Welfare of Japan in 1946. Therefore, the tuitions of the college are the same as other national universities, although being a private university. Government (Ministry of Health, Labour and Welfare) subsidies cover the other remaining costs, except for the tuitions paid by students.

== See also ==
List of social work schools
