= Meiji Pharmaceutical University =

Coordinates: 35°46′56.45″N 139°30′21.30″E

- 明治薬科大学
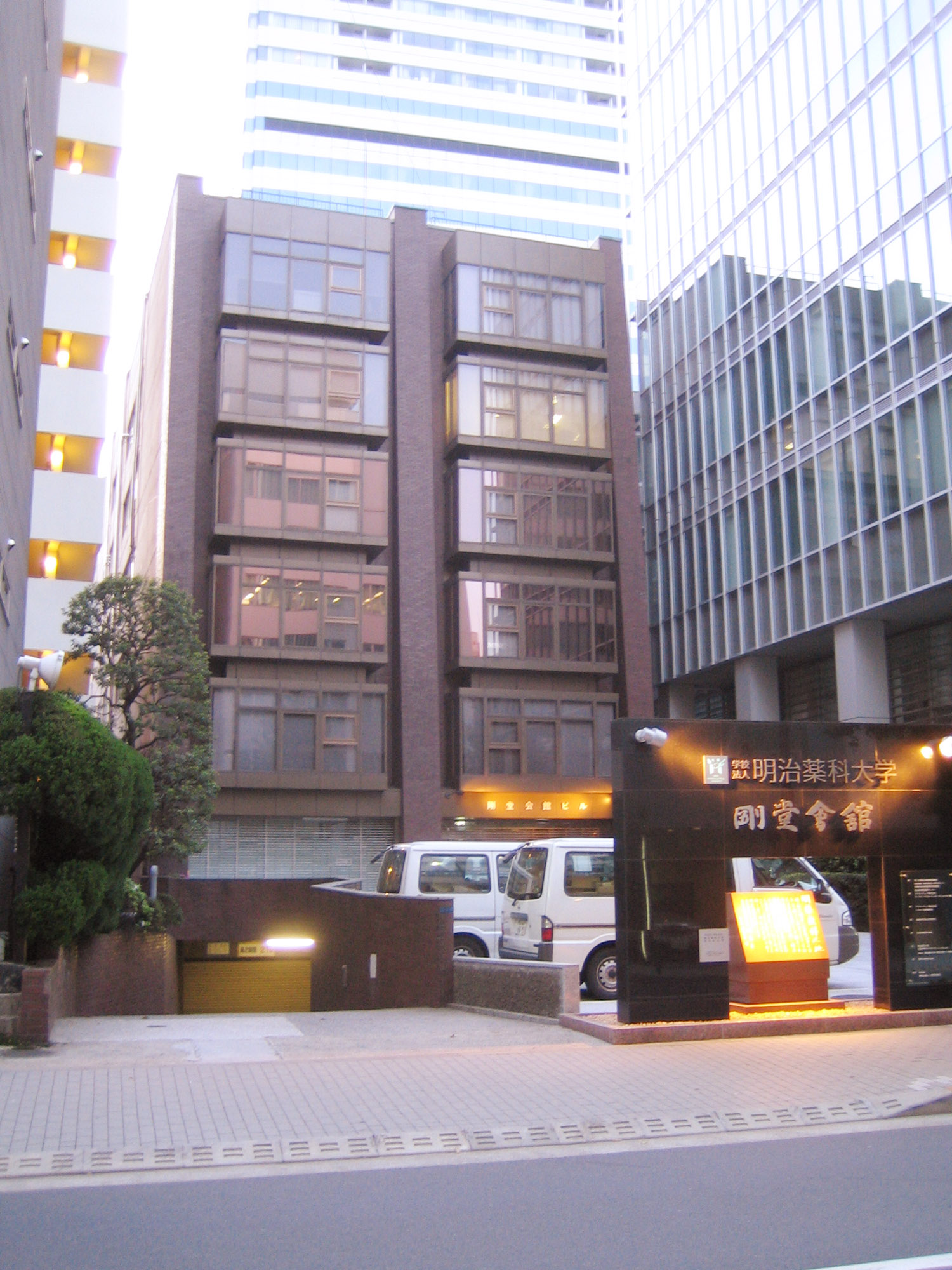
- Godo Kaikan
- Type: Private
- Established: 1902 (1949)
- Location: Kiyose, Tokyo, Japan

Meiji Pharmaceutical University (明治薬科大学, Meiji yakka daigaku) is a private university in Kiyose, Tokyo, Japan. The predecessor of the school was founded 1902.
