= Breakaway (2010 video game) =

- Promotional art
- Developer: Emergent Media Center at Champlain College
- Release: WW: June/July 2010

Breakaway is a soccer browser game developed by the Emergent Media Center at Champlain College and released during the 2010 FIFA World Cup as part of the United Nations Development Programme. The game is intended to educate children about gender issues: when the player makes gender equality-positive choices, the game enables the player's character to play better soccer.

Over 150 student developers have worked on the game since the Emergent Media Center began development in 2008. The students chose soccer because of the United Nations requirements. The developers found that the game had a positive impact on players' gender attitude; the game has also enabled mixed-gender soccer camps in multiple regions of the world.

== Gameplay ==
Screenshot from the Android port of Breakaway

The player can access the game after creating an account. The player character plays on a soccer team with the goal of reaching the finals. In each level, the player makes a number of choices related to gender equality, including a girl's abuse and abduction. The player who makes choices sympathetic to gender equality wins, while the player who interacts with negative non-player characters is designed to lose the game. Interspersed with the plot-focused levels are mini-games, where the player's character learns better skills from the more-positive characters, such as Samuel Eto'o.

== Development and release ==
The Emergent Media Center at Champlain College developed the game in response to a United Nations campaign to teach children "a healthy, equal attitude towards girls and women." The game is co-developed with the Population Media Center, and has been funded by the United Nations Population Fund and the United Nations Development Programme. It took the team of approximately 100 students two years to develop the game (5 "episodes"), with a further eight "episodes" fully completed by 2013. Over 150 students had helped with the game by 2016.

The developers traveled to South Africa to understand the "social conditions that can lead to abuse", such as physical abuse, date rape, sex slavery, and honor killing. The development of the game was challenging as a result of United Nations requirements, "including that the game show no real violence and appeal to a global population." Soccer was chosen because of its universality. The game was targeted at boys ages 9 to 14. The negative team captain was strongly-modeled after a person with borderline personality disorder; play-testers did not empathize with the initial design and so he was scaled back. The developers employed Sabido methodology, attempting to provide 70% entertainment and 30% educational message, which the director Ann DeMarle believes may have influenced the game's success. The game has been translated to four languages, and the development team provides a supplementary educator's guide for post-game activities.

The game was released during the 2010 FIFA World Cup and was later demonstrated to a number of UN officials.

In 2016, the developers were seeking an award which would enable the team to develop a mobile version, localize the game to South Africa, run camps, and provide computer equipment. They were also attempting to raise money for a Mandarin translation.

== Reception ==
CNET thought the graphics were "colorful" and the music "lively".

The developers found that 90% of players make positive decisions. Young boys initially thought the concept of girls playing soccer controversial; after playing the game, nearly 90% "agreed that girls can play soccer". Research by State University of New York at Buffalo "demonstrated that the game had a profound impact on participants' awareness and attitudes, and also indicated behavioral change."

The game has been played in 185 countries, and led to mixed-gender youth soccer camps in El Salvador and the Palestinian territories (Hebron), the latter "[challenging] social norms."
