= Alternative break =

Volunteer service trip for students

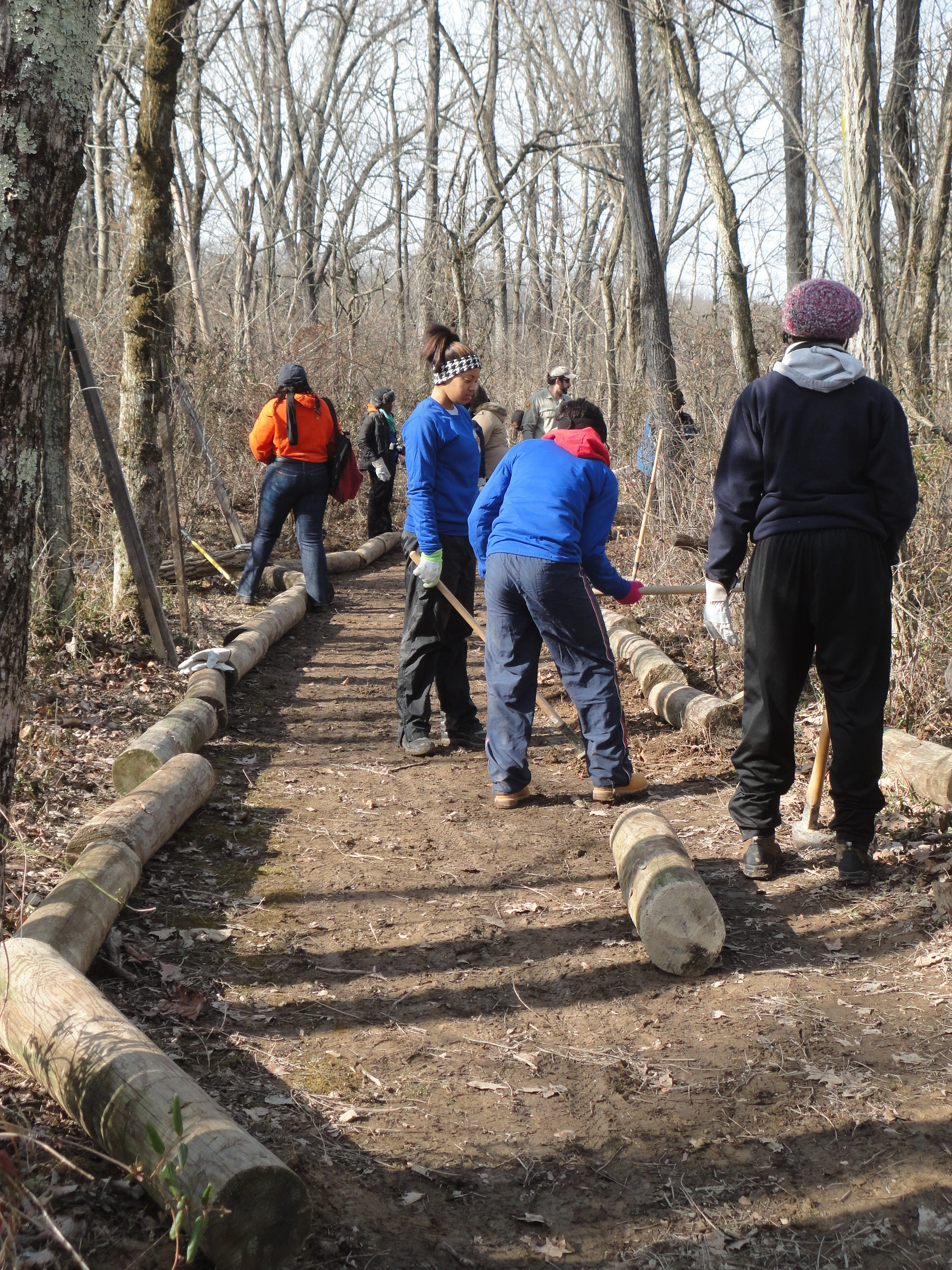
Students on cleanup duty at Shenandoah River Raymond R. "Andy" Guest Jr. State Park in Virginia during an alternative spring break trip.

An alternative break is a trip where a group of college students (usually 10–12 per trip) engage in volunteer service, typically for a week. Alternative break trips originated with college students in the early 1980s as a counter to "traditional" spring break trips. These trips are usually led by 2 "site leaders" who are students that have already participated in an alternative break and have gone through extensive leadership training.

Alternative breaks may occur during students' fall, winter, weekend, or summer school breaks. Each trip has a focus on a particular social issue, such as poverty, education reform, refugee resettlement, the environment, healthcare reform, mental health, immigration, animal care, and much more. Students learn about the social issues and then perform week-long projects with local non-profit organizations. Thus, students have the opportunity to connect and collaborate with different community partners. Some Alternative breaks are also drug and alcohol-free experiences, with a heavy emphasis on group and individual reflection.

On the site, students provide necessary services and explore the culture and the history of the area. Students who participate in this program cultivate social responsibility, leadership, and lifelong learning; thereby fostering a generation of leaders committed to positive social change. Alternative breaks challenge students to critically think and react to problems faced by members of the communities they are involved with. Being immersed in diverse environments enables participants to experience, discuss, and understand social issues in a significant way.

The intensity of the experience increases the likelihood that participants will transfer their experience on-site back to their own communities even after the alternative break ends.

The aim of the experience is to contribute volunteer hours to communities in need and to positively influence the life of the alternative breaker. Breakers are emboldened to take educated steps toward valuing and prioritizing their own communities in life choices such as recycling, donating resources, voting, etc.

Many breakers have returned to their college campuses to create a campus organization related to the social issue, have a deeper understanding and commitment to an academic path, execute a fundraiser for the non-profit organization they worked with, organize a letter writing campaign to members of Congress, volunteer in their local community, or commit to an internship or career within the non-profit sector.

== History ==
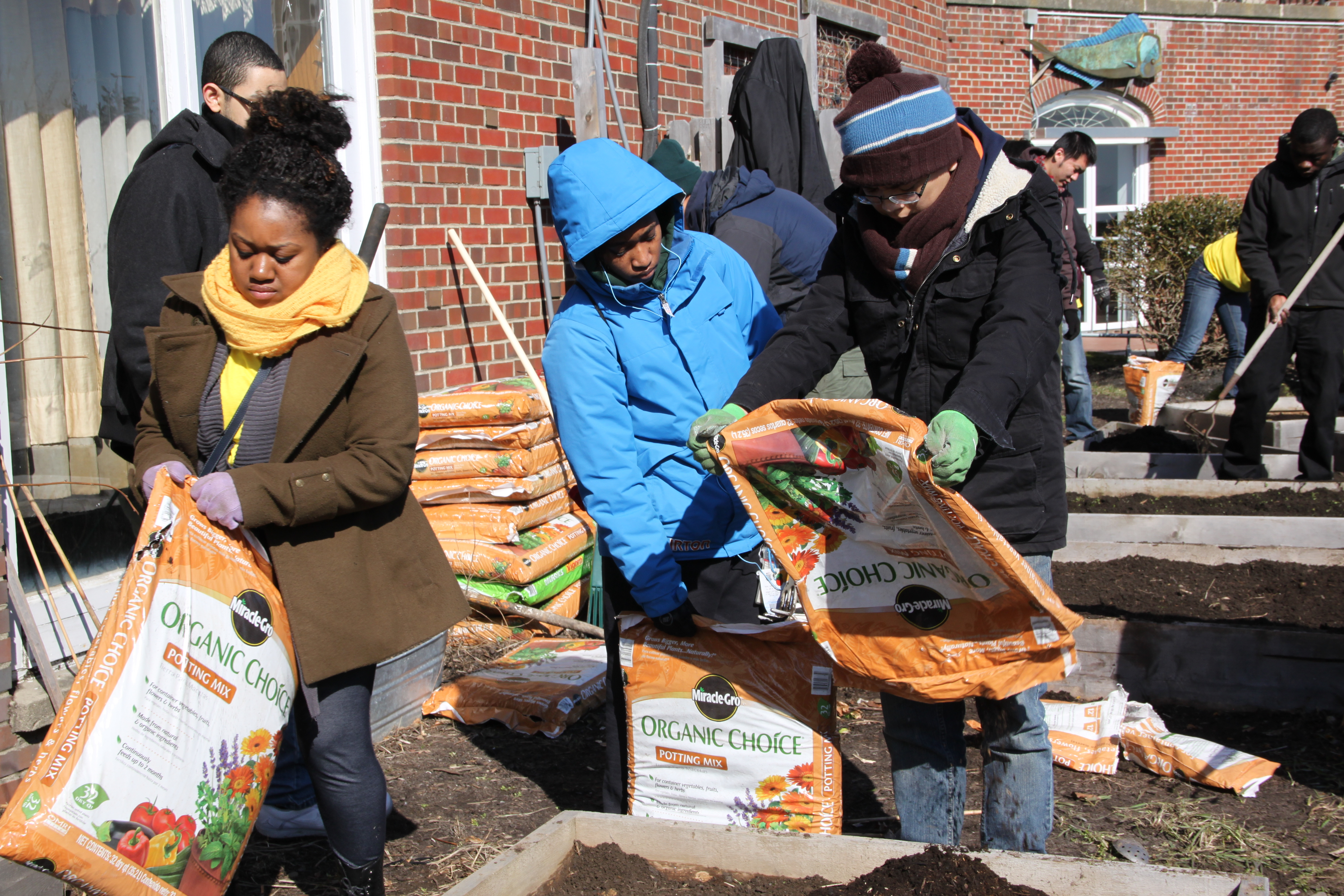
New Jersey Institute of Technology students work during an Alternative Spring Break trip in Asbury Park, New Jersey.

In 1991, Michael Magevney and Laura Mann, two recent graduates who had been very involved in building a successful alternative break program at Vanderbilt University, gained the support of then-Chancellor Joe B. Wyatt and founded a national nonprofit organization called Break Away: The Alternative Break Connection. Their purpose was to gather the resources and best practices for the alternative spring break programs that had been established on multiple campuses across the U.S. Break Away began as a modest resource center for alternative breaks and continues to be the national organization dedicated to developing lifelong active citizenship through quality alternative break programs. Break Away's development and national growth was supported and facilitated by leveraging the national network of campus service programs built by the Campus Outreach Opportunity League. COOL's National Conference provided a great platform to engage college students interested or involved in alternative breaks from all over the nation.

Student-led initiatives, now known as alternative breaks, became more prevalent on college campuses in the 1980s and early 1990s "as part of an overall surge of interest in institutionalizing community service on college campuses". Rather than travel to a traditional spring break location, groups of students came together to form a new community that was immersed in education on social issues, service work, and reflection.

For the last two decades, there has been a consistent increase in the number of colleges and universities with alternative break programs. This growth accelerated in the mid-2000s, and has been attributed to two factors: 1) the institutionalization of volunteer service as an integral part of the college experience, 2) the overwhelming interest in service work along the Gulf Coast in the aftermath of Hurricanes Katrina and Rita.

== Motivations ==
• Becoming active citizens <www.alternativebreaks.org>
• Interest in specific social issues addressed by trips
• Further involvement in student body
• Previous service experience
• Lack of service experience
• Word-of-mouth
• Interest in new experiences
• Desire to meet new people within university and external communities
• Leadership opportunities (alternative breaks are overwhelmingly student-led)
• College credit through curriculum-based alternative breaks
• Less expensive than "traditional" spring breaks
• Desire for experiences that will inform future career path
• Resume building

== Components ==
Strong Direct Service: Should provide an opportunity for participants to engage in direct or “hands on” projects and activities that address unmet social needs, as determined by the community.

Orientation: Alternative breakers learn about the purposes and goals of their community partners with which they will be working.

Education: Breakers learn about the complexity of the social issue through reading materials, speaker panels, documentaries, and guest lecturers related to current trends and historical context.

Training: Breakers are provided with adequate skills necessary to carry out service projects during their trip. This may include learning physical skills, such as construction or maintenance skills, as well as interpersonal communication, such as interacting with children, sensitivity training, working with people with disabilities, trail building, etc.

Reflection: During the trip participants process the service work as it connects to the broader social issue. Groups set aside time for reflection to take place individually and as a group. During reflection, site leaders and students discuss critical questions related to the service, themselves, and the world.

Reorientation: After students return to campus, reorientation activities allow participants to talk about issues with others on campus, learn about local volunteer and civic involvement opportunities, and brainstorm other means to benefit their local community. Reorientation (the post-trip application of the experience) is the essential purpose of an alternative break – to provide a platform for participants to work towards lifelong active citizenship.

Diversity and Social Justice: Strong alternative break programs include: 1) diverse representation of students from the campus community and 2) studying the social issue by examining the social justice concepts of power, privilege, and oppression.

"The trouble around diversity, then, isn't just that people differ from one another. The trouble is produced by a world organized in ways that encourage people to use difference to include or exclude, reward or punish, credit or discredit, elevate or oppress, value or devalue, leave alone or harass." (Privilege, Power, and Difference, 2001, Allan G. Johnson)

Alcohol & Drug Free: Alternative breaks are alcohol- and drug-free. Awareness of legality, liability, personal safety, and group cohesion addressed through training prior to the trip.

== Difference with "voluntourism" ==
“Voluntourism" is the integrated combination of voluntary service to a destination with the traditional elements of travel and tourism – arts, culture, geography, history, and recreation – while in the destination. (cite – voluntourism.org) Volunteer vacations are not alternative breaks because participants arrive as individuals with no prior preparation with educational components or group building.

Alternative breaks typically involve college students from the same institution, while most groups going on volunteer vacations will meet for the first time when they arrive at the location of the trip.

Alternative break groups meet and prepare for their experience up to six months in advance of their departure. During this preparation period, there is an emphasis on learning about the social issues addressed during the trip, learning about the community, becoming oriented with the mission and values of the organization, training for any skills they may need while on the trip, and team building. Some groups even do relevant service in their college communities prior to departure.

== Impact ==
Many students who return from an alternative break experience consider it a life changing event. Alternative break alumni have reported changing their major, increasing their campus involvement, committing to continued community service, actively staying updated on social issues, and joining a service program post-graduation such as AmeriCorps, Peace Corps, or Teach for America. Many return to participate and lead alternative break programs throughout their time as students.

An impact analysis conducted in 2001 by Dr. Pushkala Raman and her Marketing Research Class at Florida State University in conjunction with Break Away revealed that there is overwhelming evidence to support the view that alternative breaks are "indeed contributing to the creating of active citizens." Some highlights of the study include the following:

• Participants show stronger intentions of voting after participation
• Research indicates that alternative break participants are inclined to increase the amount of time they dedicate to serving the community after an alternative break experience.

In 2002, Dr. Raman conducted another study measuring the satisfaction of nonprofit organizations that utilize alternative breakers. Her work produced the following insights:

• 100% of nonprofit organizations that responded and had hosted break groups agreed or strongly agreed that they benefited from the work done by alternative breakers. • 100% of the same nonprofit organizations were interested in hosting alternative break groups again in the future.
