= Ōishi Sadahisa =

Uesugi retainer and builder

Ōishi Sadahisa (大石 定久; 1 May 1491 – 27 October 1549) was a retainer of the Ogigayatsu-Uesugi branch of the Uesugi, and the builder of Takiyama Castle (滝山城). After the Uesugi were defeated at Kawagoe in 1545, Ōishi accepted the authority of the Hōjō. However, their leader was murdered, and was replaced by Hōjō Ujimasa's second son Hōjō Ujiteru. After the fall of the Hōjō, Ōishi Yoshinaka and Sadakatsu came to work for Okubo Nagayasu.
