= Takiyama Prefectural Natural Park =

Prefectural natural park in Tokyo, Japan

Coordinates: 35°42′5.3″N 139°19′45.2″E

- 都立滝山自然公園
- Interactive map of Takiyama Prefectural Natural Park
- Location: Tokyo, Japan
- Nearest city: Hachiōji
- Area: 6.61 km^{2} (2.55 sq mi)
- Established: 7 November 1950

Takiyama Prefectural Natural Park (都立滝山自然公園, Toritsu Takiyama shizen kōen) is a Prefectural Natural Park in Western Tokyo, Japan. Established in 1950, the park's central feature is Mount Taki, to the south of the confluence of the Tama and Aki (秋川) Rivers. The park is celebrated for its views over the Kantō Plain.

== See also ==
- National Parks of Japan
- Parks and gardens in Tokyo
- Meiji no Mori Takao Quasi-National Park
