= List of Long-distance Nature Trails (Japan) =

Long-distance Nature Trails (長距離自然歩道, Chōkyori shizen hodō) are nature trails that span multiple prefectures and are planned by the Ministry of the Environment and maintained and managed by each prefecture in Japan.

== Long-distance Nature Trails ==
The purpose of the trail is to allow people to experience the richness of nature, history and culture, to refresh their minds and bodies, and to deepen their understanding of nature conservation through easy, enjoyable, and safe walking on their own feet throughout the four seasons. Beginning with the construction of the Tōkai Nature Trail in 1970, the trail has been developed in stages. Once completed, the total length of nature trails in Japan will be approximately 27,000 km.

From family-friendly courses to professional courses, visitors can enjoy walking to the highlights of each region.

| Trail | Prefectures | Length | Initial Development | Comments | Image | Ref. |
|---|---|---|---|---|---|---|
| Tōkai Nature Trail 東海自然歩道; Tōkai shizen hodō | Tokyo, Kanagawa, Yamanashi, Shizuoka, Aichi, Gifu, Mie, Shiga, Nara, Kyoto, Osaka | 1,734 kilometres (1,077 mi) | 1970–1973 | links Meiji no Mori Takao Quasi-National Park in Tokyo Metropolis with Meiji no Mori Minō Quasi-National Park in Osaka Prefecture | | |
| Kyūshū Nature Trail 九州自然歩道; Kyūshū shizen hodō | Fukuoka, Saga, Nagasaki, Kumamoto, Ōita, Miyazaki, Kagoshima | 2,932 kilometres (1,822 mi) | 1975–1980 | also known as Yamabiko-san (やまびこさん) | | |
| Chūgoku Nature Trail 中国自然歩道; Chūgoku shizen hodō | Yamaguchi, Shimane, Tottori, Okayama, Hiroshima | 2,295 kilometres (1,426 mi) | 1977–1982 | | | |
| Shikoku Nature Trail 四国自然歩道; Shikoku shizen hodō | Tokushima, Kōchi, Ehime, Kagawa | 1,647 kilometres (1,023 mi) | 1981–1989 | also known as Shikoku no michi (四国のみち) | | |
| Capital Region Nature Trail 首都圏自然歩道; Shutoken shizen hodō | Kanagawa, Tokyo, Saitama, Gunma, Tochigi, Ibaraki, Chiba | 1,794 kilometres (1,115 mi) | 1982–1988 | also known as Kantō fureai no michi (関東ふれあいの道) | | |
| Tōhoku Nature Trail 東北自然歩道; Tōhoku shizen hodō | Aomori, Iwate, Miyagi, Akita, Yamagata, Fukushima | 4,369 kilometres (2,715 mi) | 1990–1996 | also known as Shin・Oku no hosomichi (新・奥の細道) | | |
| Chūbu-Hokuriku Nature Trail 中部北陸自然歩道; Chūbu Hokuriku shizen hodō | Niigata, Gunma, Toyama, Ishikawa, Fukui, Nagano, Gifu, Shiga | 4,091 kilometres (2,542 mi) | 1995–2000 | | | |
| Kinki Nature Trail 近畿自然歩道; Kinki shizen hodō | Fukui, Shiga, Mie, Kyōto, Nara, Wakayama, Ōsaka, Hyōgo, Tottori | 3,296 kilometres (2,048 mi) | 1997–2003 | | | |
| Hokkaidō Nature Trail 北海道自然歩道; Hokkaidō shizen hodō | Hokkaidō | 4,600 kilometres (2,900 mi) | 2003–2012 | | | |
| Tōhoku Pacific Coast Nature Trail 東北太平洋岸自然歩道; Tōhoku Taiheiyō kishi shizen hodō | Aomori, Iwate, Miyagi, Fukushima | 1,025 kilometres (637 mi) | 2012–2019 | also known as Michinoku Coastal Trail (みちのく潮風トレイル) | | |

== See also ==
- Long-distance trail
