= Takao Jinba Prefectural Natural Park =

Prefectural natural park of Tokyo, Japan

Coordinates: 35°37′30.1″N 139°14′35.6″E

- 都立高尾陣場自然公園
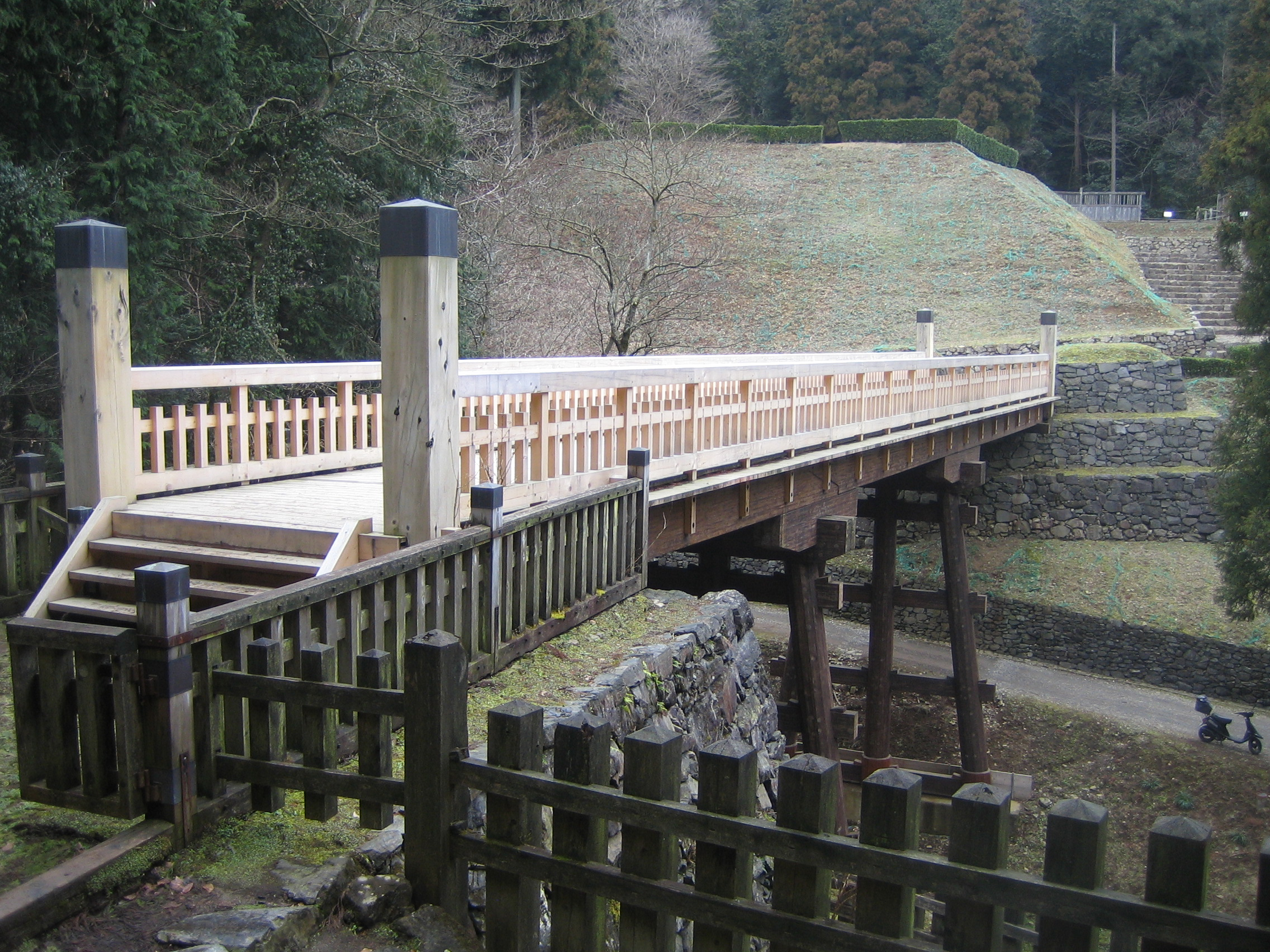
- Hachiōji Castle
- Interactive map of Takao Jinba Prefectural Natural Park
- Location: Tokyo, Japan
- Nearest city: Hachiōji
- Area: 44.03 km^{2} (17.00 sq mi)
- Established: 25 November 1950

Takao Jinba Prefectural Natural Park (都立高尾陣場自然公園, Toritsu Takao Jinba shizen kōen) is a Prefectural Natural Park in Western Tokyo, Japan. The park was established in 1950.

== See also ==
- National Parks of Japan
- Parks and gardens in Tokyo
- Mount Takao
- Meiji no Mori Takao Quasi-National Park
