= Jun Suzuki (footballer, born 1961) =

Japanese footballer and manager

Jun Suzuki 鈴木 淳
Personal information
- Full name: Jun Suzuki
- Date of birth: August 17, 1961 (age 65)
- Place of birth: Watari, Miyagi, Japan
- Height: 1.71 m (5 ft 7 1/2 in)
- Position: Midfielder

Youth career
- 1977–1979: Sendai Mukaiyama High School

College career
Years	Team	Apps	(Gls)
1980–1993	University of Tsukuba		

Senior career*
Years	Team	Apps	(Gls)
1984–1988	Fujita Industries		
1989–1991	Matsushima SC		
1992–1996	Brummell Sendai		

International career
1979	Japan U-20	2	(0)

Managerial career
- 2004–2005: Montedio Yamagata
- 2006–2009: Albirex Niigata
- 2010–2012: Omiya Ardija
- 2013–2014: JEF United Chiba
- 2022–2024: Sony Sendai FC
- * Club domestic league appearances and goals

Jun Suzuki (鈴木 淳, Suzuki Jun; born August 17, 1961) is a former Japanese football player and managed the dissolved JFL club Sony Sendai FC in their last two seasons.

== Club career ==
Suzuki was born in Watari, Miyagi on August 17, 1961. After graduating from University of Tsukuba, he joined Japan Soccer League club Fujita Industries in 1984. From 1989, he played his local club Matsushima SC and Brummell Sendai. In 1996, he retired.

== National team career ==
In 1979, when Suzuki was a high school student, he selected Japan U-20 national team for 1979 World Youth Championship in Japan. At this competition, he played 2 matches.

== Managerial career ==
Suzuki started his coaching career in 2004, signing for J2 League side Montedio Yamagata, leaving the club after two seasons. From 2006 to 2009, he was the manager for J1 League side Albirex Niigata. In April 2010, he was named the new Omiya Ardija manager, following Chang Woe-Ryong's departure. In May 2012, he was sacked from Omiya.

On 2013, Suzuki was named the manager of J2 League side JEF United Chiba, but failed to get promotion to J1 League. On 2014, after a poor half-season, he was sacked on 23 June 2014.

On 11 January 2022, he was appointed manager at Sony Sendai FC.

== Managerial statistics ==
Team	From	To	Record				
Team	From	To	G	W	D	L	Win %
Montedio Yamagata	2004	2005	92	37	30	25	40.22
Albirex Niigata	2006	2009	169	59	44	66	34.91
Omiya Ardija	2010	2012	85	28	25	32	32.94
JEF United Chiba	2013	2014	64	26	20	18	40.63
Sony Sendai FC	2022	2024	93	29	30	34	31.18
Total			503	179	149	175	35.59
