= Sakamoto Station (Miyagi) =

Railway station in Yamamoto, Miyagi Prefecture, Japan

Sakamoto Station 坂元駅
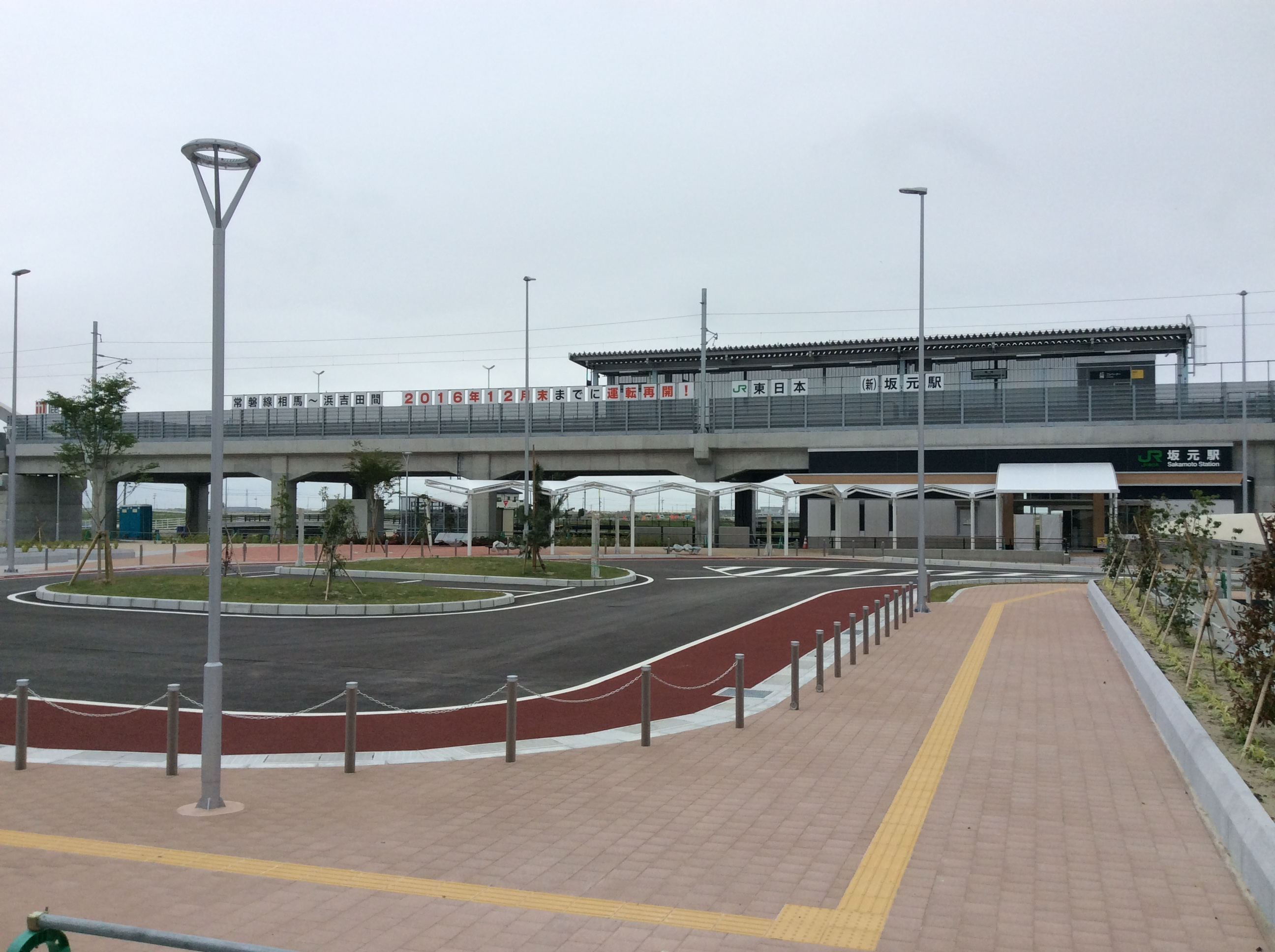
- The rebuilt elevated station in June 2016

General information
- Location: Sakamoto Yamamoto-cho, Watari-gun, Miyagi-ken 989-2111; Japan
- Coordinates: 37°55′27.7″N 140°54′3.9″E
- Operator: JR East
- Line: ■ Joban Line
- Distance: 321.2 km from Nippori
- Platforms: 1 island platform
- Tracks: 2

Other information
- Status: Staffed
- Website: www.jreast.co.jp/estation/station/info.aspx?StationCd=732

History
- Opened: 10 November 1897
- Rebuilt: 2016

Passengers
- FY2018: 248

Services
Preceding station	JR East	Following station
Shinchi towards Shinagawa	Jōban Line Local-Futsuu	Yamashita towards Sendai
Location
- Location within Miyagi Prefecture Location within Japan

Sakamoto Station (坂元駅, Sakamoto-eki) is a railway station in the town of Yamamoto, Miyagi Prefecture, Japan, operated by East Japan Railway Company (JR East). The original station was severely damaged by the 2011 Tōhoku earthquake and tsunami in March 2011, and was relocated to a new location in December 2016.

== Lines ==
Sakamoto Station is served by the Jōban Line, and is located 321.2 kilometers from the official starting point of the line at Nippori in Tokyo.

== Station layout ==
The station had a single island platform connected to the station building by a footbridge. It is now an elevated station with a single side platform serving a single bi-directional track. The station building is located underneath. The station is staffed.

== History ==
Sakamoto Station opened on November 10, 1897. The station was absorbed into the JR East network upon the privatization of the Japanese National Railways (JNR) on April 1, 1987.

Services on the Jōban Line between Hamayoshida Station and Soma Station were suspended due to damage caused by the 2011 Tōhoku earthquake and tsunami on 11 March 2011. The station reopened at a new location 1100 meters further inland on 10 December 2016.。

== Passenger statistics ==
In fiscal 2018, the station was used by an average of 135 passengers daily (boarding passengers only).

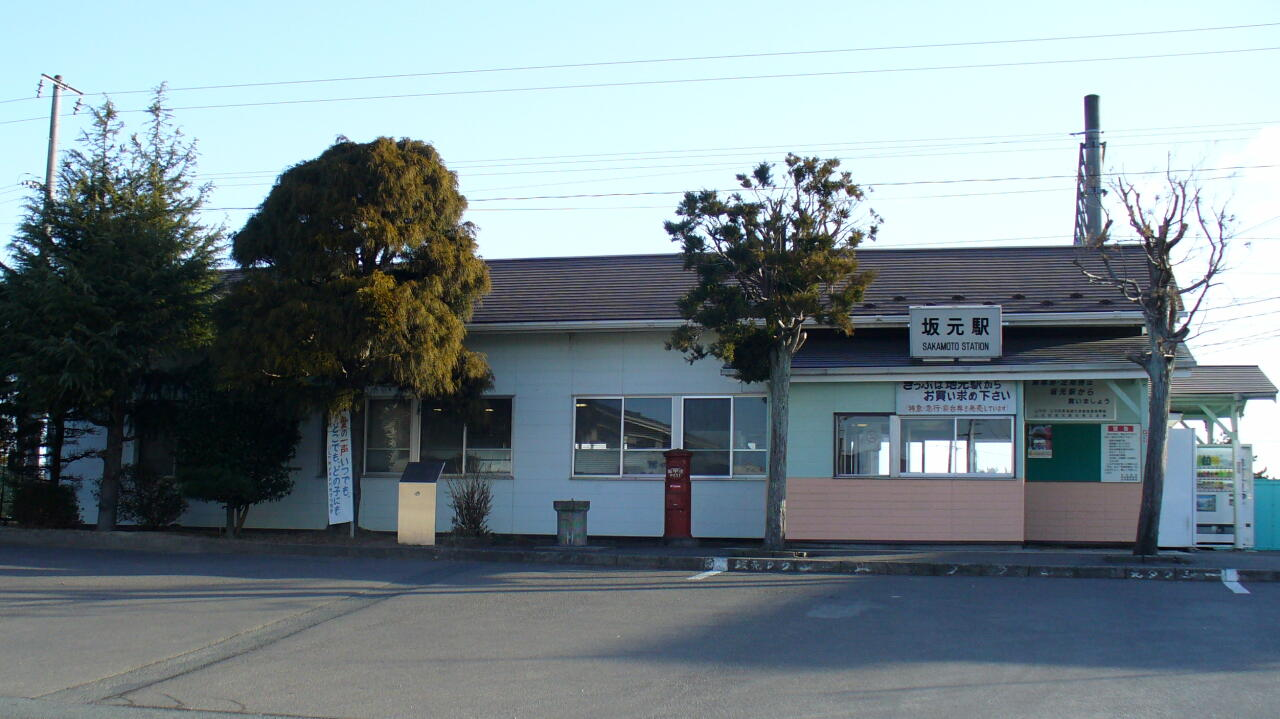
The former station building in January 2008

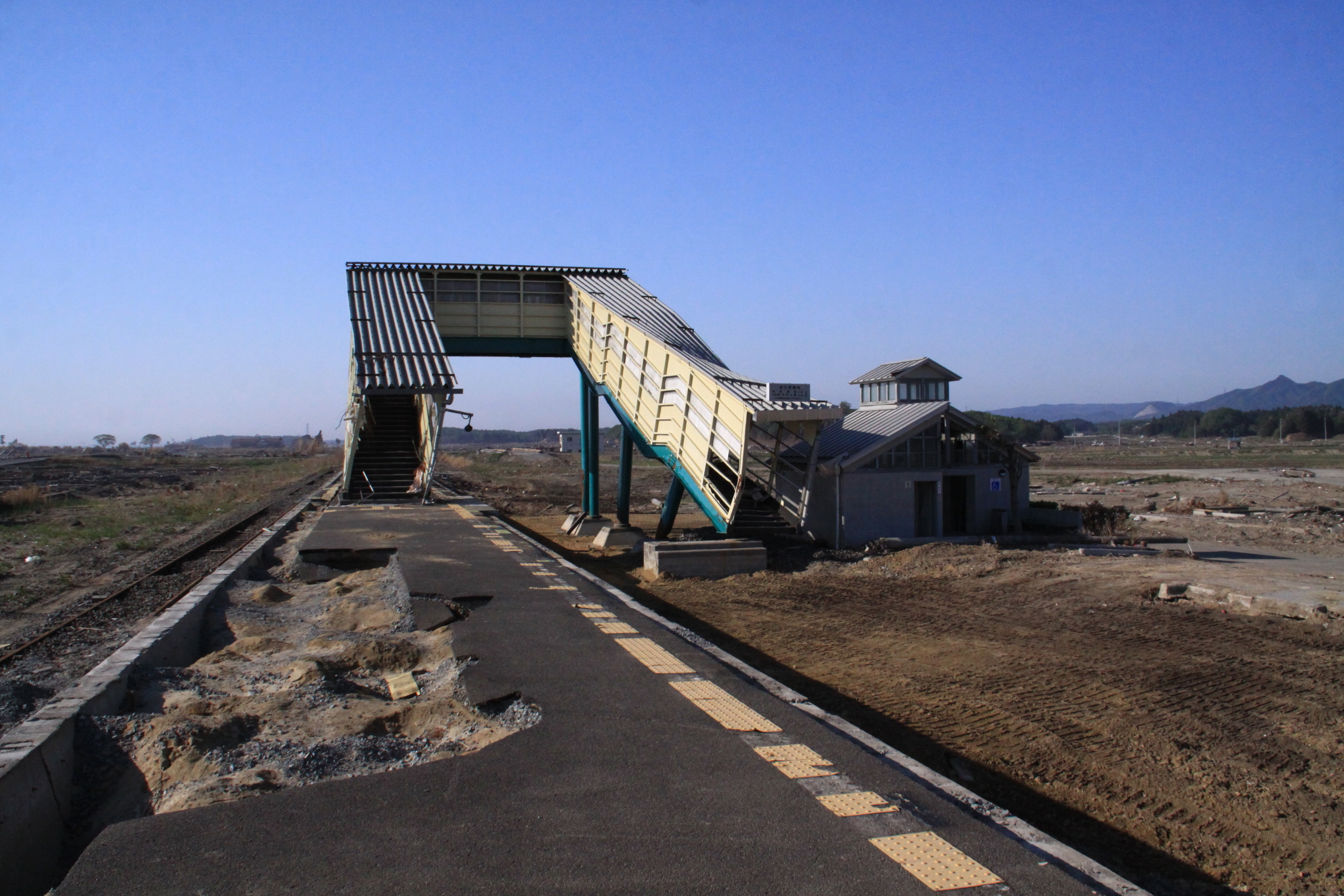
The station building and platform in May 2011 after the tsunami

== Surrounding area ==
- National Route 6
- Former Sakamoto town hall

== See also ==
- List of railway stations in Japan
