= Michinoku Coastal Trail =

Nature trail in Japan

The Michinoku Coastal Trail (みちのく潮風トレイル) is one of the ten Long Distance Nature Trails of Japan. It is located on the eastern coast of Tohoku.

This trail was created by the Ministry of Environment in cooperation with the local governments, NGOs and local people under the proposal of travel writer Noriyoshi Kato. It is directly managed by the Michinoku Trail Club.

== History ==
The project of a trail running along the Pacific coast of Tohoku dates back to 2012.

One year after the 2011 Tohoku earthquake and Tsunami, the Ministry of Environment started to plan the Green Reconstruction Project. This project consisted of a set of initiatives aiming at rebuilding the coast while including natural spaces, protecting local lifestyles and promoting sustainability.

The whole Green Reconstruction Project was built around the fusion of several national and quasi-national parks in the region, but it also included environmental education activities, ecotourism promotion as well as the creation of a trail going through a natural park: the Michinoku Coastal Trail.

According to a 2012 document from the Ministry of Environment, the philosophy behind the trail’s creation was to make “a Long Distance Nature Trail running from Fukushima up to Aomori which can act as a ‘bridge’ connecting nature, local lifestyles, and traces of the disaster with hikers.”

The trail course was planned to provide hikers the chance to reach places on foot that can’t be accessed by car, to experience natural and cultural landscapes, unique historical sites and local cultures.

Several information centers were also designated in each prefecture along the trail, allowing hikers to get first-hand information about hiking conditions.

For seven years the project was being prepared, with sections of the trail being gradually released. The full Michinoku Coastal Trail course was released in June 2019, reaching a total length of 1025 kilometers. It is the tenth Long Distance Natural Trail of Japan created by the Ministry of Environment since the seventies.

== Course ==
The trail is about 1000 kilometers, and runs through 4 prefectures and 28 municipalities of Japan. Walking from one end to the other takes about fifty days. The course goes through a wide variety of landscapes, and different types of paths such as landmarked touristic roads, mountain trails, paved roads, old medieval roads and even some boat parts. The course has been designed by the Ministry of Environment in cooperation with local public bodies, after several workshops and discussions with the local communities.

Short courses have been designed for hikers to walk a smaller portion of the trail. With each portion comes a place where to sleep, as well as information on restaurants along the way.

List of the municipalities hosting the trail:

Aomori Prefecture

- Hachinohe
- Hashikami

Iwate Prefecture

- Hirono
- Kuji
- Noda
- Fudai
- Tanohata
- Iwaizumi
- Miyako
- Yamada
- Otsuchi
- Kamaishi
- Ofunato
- Rikuzentakata

Miyagi Prefecture

- Kesennuma
- Minamisanriku
- Onagawa
- Ishinomaki
- Higashi-Matsushima
- Shiogama
- Tagajo
- Sendai
- Natori
- Iwanuma
- Watari
- Yamamoto

Fukushima Prefecture

- Shinchi
- Soma

== Information and management ==
The Michinoku Coastal Trail is managed by a network of local governments, private groups, and volunteers. This network is headed by Michinoku Trail Club, a nonprofit corporation.

In parallel, six information centers can be found along the trail. Each of the satellite information center provides users with information about specific areas of the trail, while the Natori Trail Center is the central information point for the whole trail.

Information centers (satellite facilities):

- Tanesashi Coast Information Center (Hachinohe)
- Kitayamazaki Visitor Center (Tanohata)
- Jodogahama Visitor Center (Miyako)
- Goishi Coast Information Center (Ofunato)
- Minamisanriku Marine Visitor Center (Minamisanriku)
- Natori Trail Center (Natori)

== Michinoku Coastal Trail Charter ==
The Michinoku Coastal Trail Charter was established by the Natori Trail Center Management Council in order to promote the project on based on a common philosophy and a strong cooperation between all the parties concerned with the trail. The Charter is a set of principles for the development of the trail, it expresses the principles that will be the basis for the efforts of all parties involved in the various fields of trail maintenance, trail management, and promotion of use of the trail.

1. The trail will be for enjoying beautiful sights and natural features.
2. The trail will bring about connections between people who live in a place and those who visit that place.
3. The trail will leave lifelong memories of nature’s kindness and harshness.
4. The trail will forever testify the memories of disaster.
5. The trail will pass on rich nature and cultures to future generations.
6. The trail will welcome all who love to walk and will develop with everyone’s help.

== Awards ==
In 2019, the Michinoku Coastal Trail was selected by National Geographic’s Best Trips to Take in 2020 and received the Japan Tourism Agency Commissioner's Award.

In 2020 it was selected as a finalist for the British Guild of Travel Writers International Tourism Awards 2020
