= Kantō Fureai Trail =

Collection of hiking trails in Japan

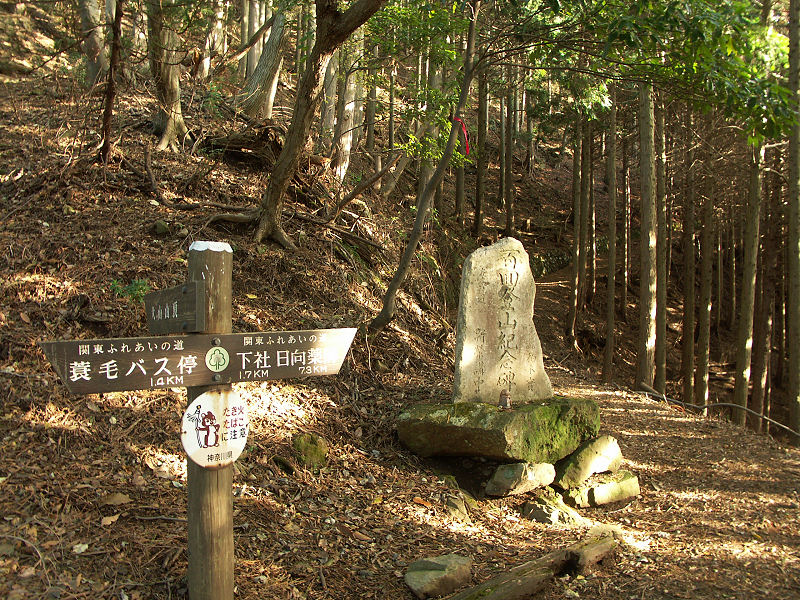

The Kantō Fureai Trail (関東ふれあいの道, Kantō Fureai no Michi), alternately called the Capital Region Nature Trail (首都圏自然歩道, Shutoken Shizen Hodō), is a collection of hiking trails starting and ending at “Umenoki Daira” located along National Route 20 at the foothills of Mount Takao in Hachiōji, Tokyo, Japan. It circumnavigates the entire Kantō Region through Mount Takao, Okutama, Chichibu, Mount Myōgi, Mount Taihei, Mount Tsukuba, Kasumigaura, Kujūkuri Beach, Bōsō, Miura Peninsula, and Tanzawa, stretching about 1,800 km. The 160 routes are laid out to cover natural scenery and pastoral landscapes, as well as cultural and historical sites. Each course, lasting roughly 10 km, links two points accessible by public transportation but does not necessarily connect to the next route.

== Courses in Tokyo ==
The Tokyo section of the Kantō Fureai Trail begins with the Lake Path (湖のみち). The section contains seven trails between Takao and Okutama, totaling 74.4 km.

=== Lake Path (湖のみち) ===
The Lake Path is the first leg of the Kantō Fureai Trail. It offers splendid landscapes of Tsukui Lake and the Sagami River and, from the summit of Mount Shiroyama, views of Sagami Lake, peaks of the Tanzawa Mountain Range, and Mount Fuji. At the crossroads of Umenoki Daira, the trail connects to Mine no Yakushi Path (峰の薬師へのみち) in Kanagawa Prefecture. Covering 16.2 km, the trail starts at Umenoki Daira, through Misawa Pass, Ōtarumi Pass, Icchōdaira, and Mount Takao to the end point at Takaosanguchi Station. Points of interest include Ōtarumi Pass (388 m), located on the border between Tokyo and Kanagawa Prefecture, and Yakuō-in, a temple established in 744. The approach to the temple is also famous for its row of sugi trees, whose age is estimated to be 700 years old.

=== Bird Path (鳥のみち) ===
The Bird Path is a 20 km path that spans from the start point of the Tōkaidō Nature Trail to Mount Jinba through Mount Takao. The area from Mount Keishin to Mount Jinba is inhabited by a wide variety of birds. The summit of Mount Jinba is surrounded by Cherry and Daimyo Oak trees with and provides a great panoramic view of Mount Fuji and the mountains of Tanza and Okutama. The route begins at Takaosan-guchi Station, passing through Mount Takao, Mount Shiroyama, Kobotoke Pass, Mount Keishin, and Mount Jinba, and ends at Jinba Kōgen Bus Stop, roughly taking 7 hours to finish.

=== Mount Fuji Path (富士見のみち) ===
This 14.7 hiking trail starts from Wada Pass, passing through Mount Godaikomaru (867m), Mount Shōtō (990 m), Mount Kumakura (1427 m), and to Asama Pass. The rugged route follows the ridge Sasaone, that constitutes a border between Tokyo, Yamanashi Prefecture, and Kanagawa Prefecture. There are views of Mount Fuji between Asama Pass and Mount Shōtō.
