= Walk Japan =

Japanese tour company

- Industry: Tourism
- Founded: 1992
- Key People: Professor Tom Stanley (Professor and Co-founder), Dick Irving (Professor and Founder), Paul Christie (Chief Executive)
- Products: Tour Agency
- Website: www.walkjapan.com

Walk Japan Limited or simply Walk Japan, is a Japan based tour company, founded in 1992 by Tom Stanley and Dick Irving. The company is a pioneer of "off-the-beaten-track" walking tours in Japan and are known for their tours to parts of Japan that are often not available for most visitors to Japan. They have been recognised for their work, including by National Geographic as one of the 200 Best Adventure Travel Companies on Earth.

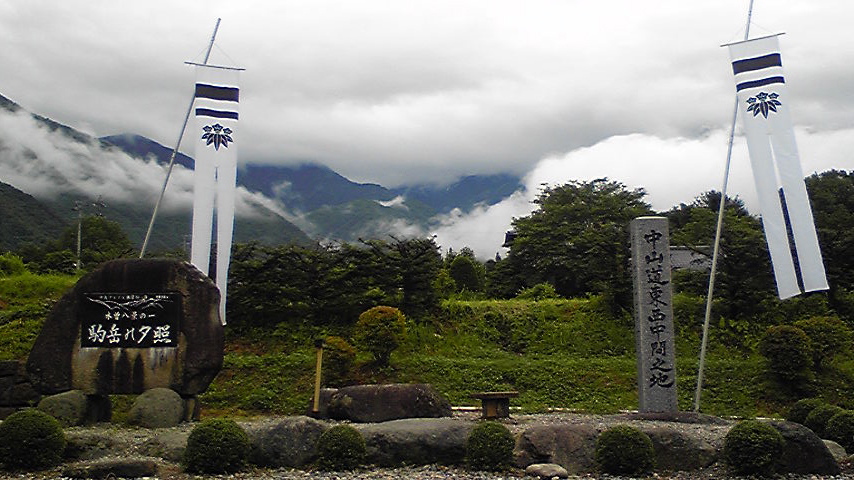
The half-way point of the Nakasendo Way tour.

== Japan Tours ==
Walk Japan currently has 34 guided and self-guided tours. They are best known for the Nakasendo Way tour, which has been featured in publications such as The Sydney Morning Herald, The Observer, as well as 1,000 Places to See Before You Die. Their tour leaders are generally positively rated by both customers and travel writers alike for their enthusiasm, friendliness, knowledge of Japan and professionalism. The company also offers customized tours to its customers, as well as tours for schools and academic institutions.

=== Nakasendo Way ===
Walk Japan’s pioneer walking tour is the Nakasendo (中山道) Way. The 11-day, 10-night tour, spans 180 kilometres and explores one of Japan’s old highways, once a vital link between Kyoto and Tokyo. The tour starts in Kyoto, an ancient capital and cultural epicentre of Japan, and follows some preserved parts of the old road deep into the mountains before ending in the capital of Japan, Tokyo. Walk Japan also offers a shorter version of the tour, Nakasendo Way: The Kiso Road, which focuses on the Kiso valley, one of the more scenic parts of the Nakasendo Way.

=== Other tours ===
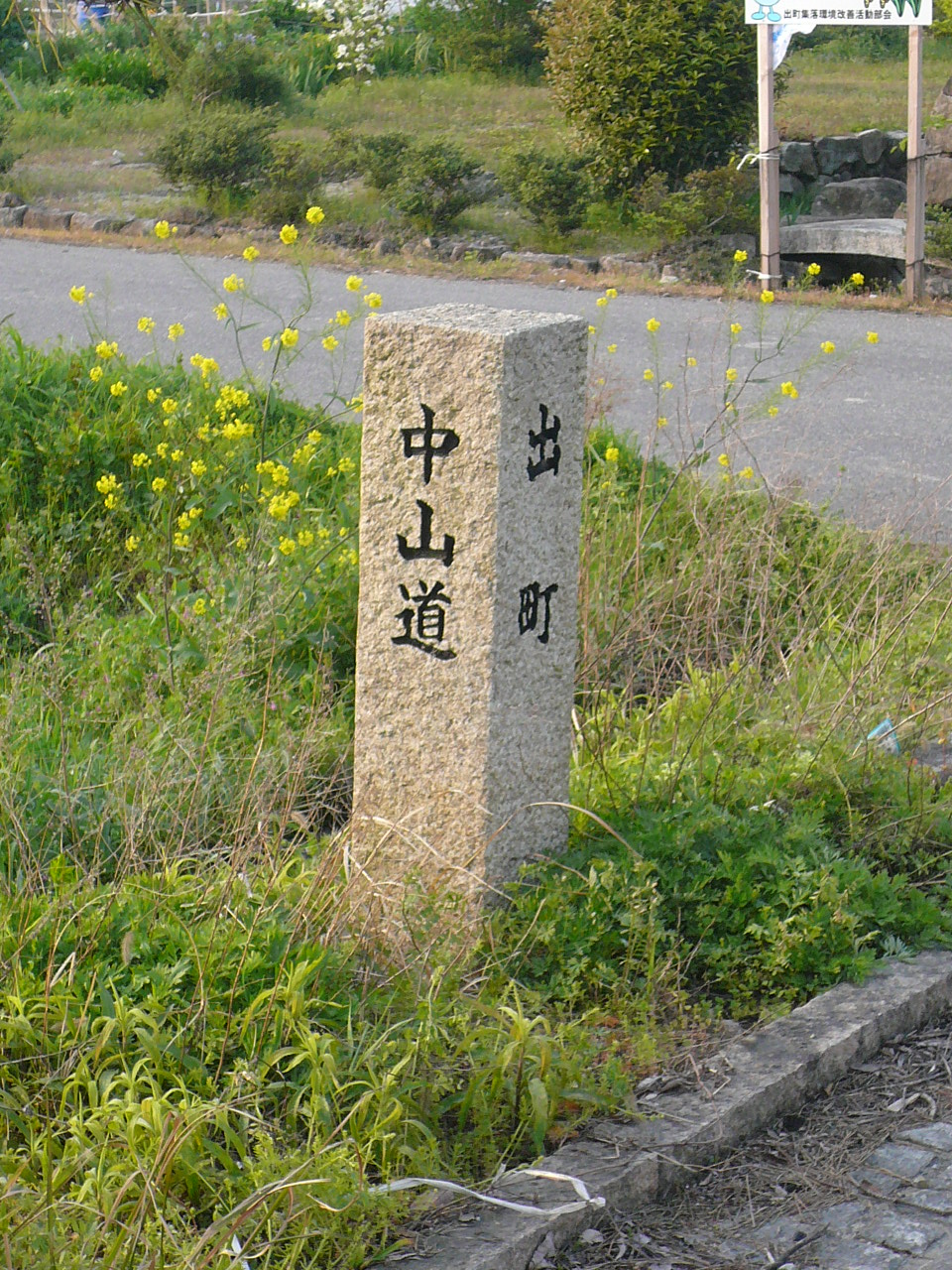
Path marker along the Nakasendo Way tour.

In addition to the Nakasendo Way tour, Walk Japan offers other themed tours such as the Kumano Kodo Pilgrimage, the Kunisaki Trek, the Basho Tohoku Tour, and the Michinoku Coastal Trail.
