= Okuma =

Okuma or Ōkuma may refer to:

== Surname ==
- Ōkuma Shigenobu (大隈重信) (1838 – 1922) 8th and 17th Prime Minister of Japan, founder of Waseda University
- Enuka Okuma, Canadian actress of Nigerian descent
- Yuji Okuma, (born 1969), former Japanese football player

== Other uses ==
- Okuma Corporation, a manufacturer of CNC turning and milling machines
- Ōkuma, Fukushima (大熊町; -machi), a town located in Futaba District, Fukushima Prefecture, Japan
- Ōkuma Station (逢隈駅), a JR East railway station located in Watari, Miyagi Prefecture, Japan
