= Tama Forest Science Garden =

Arboretum in Hachiōji, Tokyo, Japan

Coordinates: 35°38′45″N 139°16′46″E

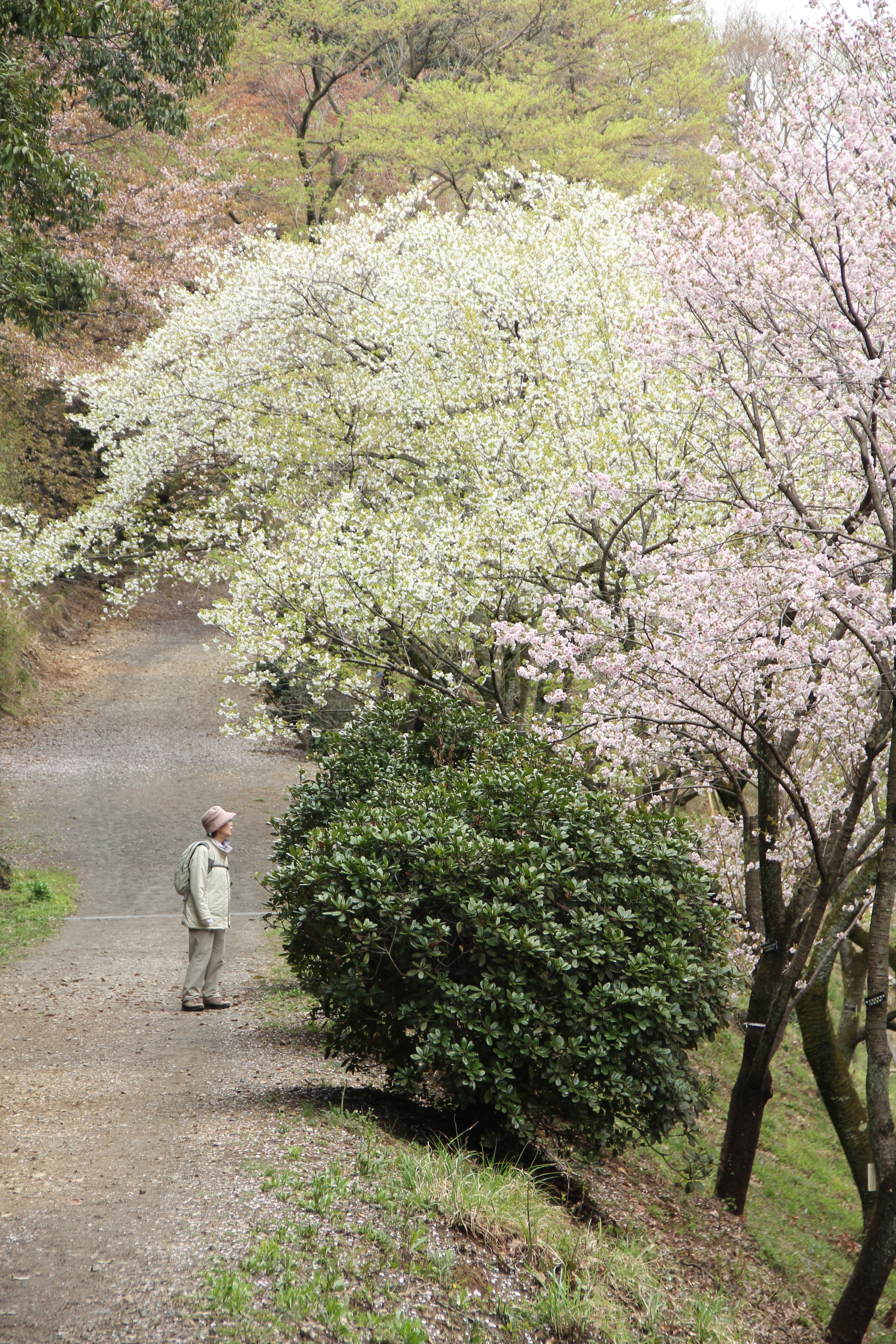
Tama Forest Science Garden, 2012.

The Tama Forest Science Garden (多摩森林科学園, Tama Shinrin Kagakuen; 57 hectares), formerly the Asakawa Experiment Forest and sometimes also known as the Tama Botanical Park, is an arboretum located at the foot of Mount Takao, 1833-81 Todori, Hachiōji, Tokyo, Japan. It is open daily except Mondays; an admission fee is charged.

== History ==
The site was previously a battlefield where Hojo Ujiteru fought Takeda Shingen, then placed under custody of the Tokugawa shogunate. In 1921, it became an experimental station under the custody of the Forestry Management Division of the Ministry of Imperial Household. Today it is a branch laboratory of the Forestry and Forest Products Research Institute.

== Gardens ==
The garden includes 13 hectares of natural forest which consists mainly of Abies firma and Pinus densiflora, and broad-leaf evergreens such as Quercus glauca and Castanopsis cuspidata var. sieboldii. It also contains an arboretum with about 1,000 kinds of domestic and foreign trees, including 2,000 cherry trees representing 250 cherry varieties.

== See also ==
- List of botanical gardens in Japan
