= Yamashita Station (Miyagi) =

Railway station in Yamamoto, Miyagi Prefecture, Japan

Yamashita Station 山下駅
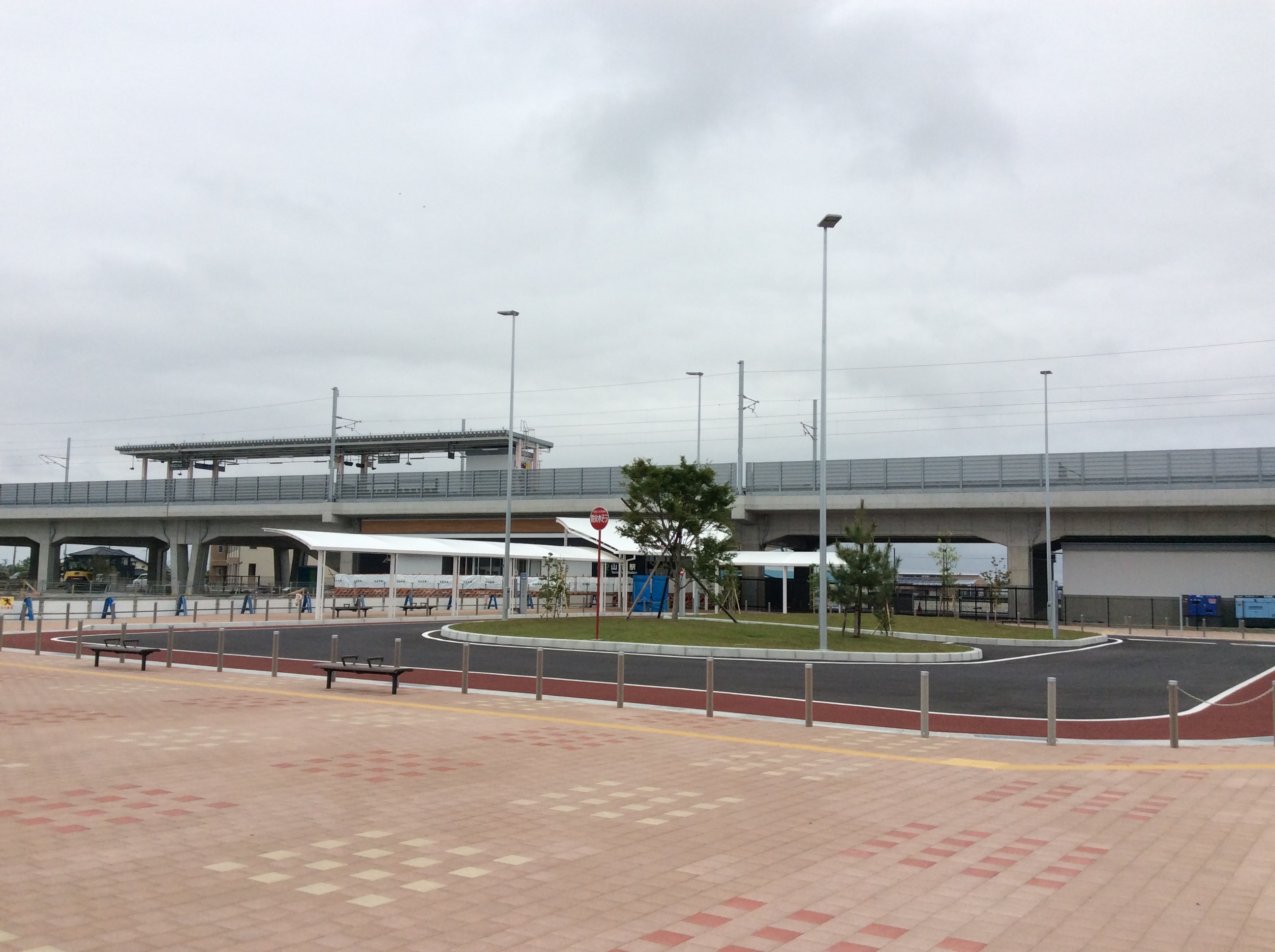
- The rebuilt elevated station in June 2016

General information
- Location: Yamadera, Yamamoto-cho, Watari-gun, Miyagi-ken 989-2111; Japan
- Coordinates: 37°57′57.9″N 140°53′22″E
- Operator: JR East
- Line: ■ Joban Line
- Distance: 325.7 km from Nippori
- Platforms: 1 side platform + 1 island platform
- Tracks: 3

Other information
- Status: Staffed ("Midori no Madoguchi")
- Website: Official website

History
- Opened: May 10, 1949
- Rebuilt: 2016

Passengers
- FY2018: 598

Services
Preceding station	JR East	Following station
Sakamoto towards Shinagawa	Jōban Line Local-Futsuu	Hamayoshida towards Sendai
Location
- Location within Miyagi Prefecture Location within Japan

Yamashita Station (山下駅, Yamashita-eki) is a railway station in the town of Yamamoto, Miyagi Prefecture, Japan, operated by East Japan Railway Company (JR East). The original station was severely damaged by the 2011 Tōhoku earthquake and tsunami in March 2011, and was relocated to a new location in December 2016.

== Lines ==
Yamashita Station is served by the Jōban Line, and is located 325.7 kilometers from the official starting point of the line at Nippori in Tokyo.

== Station layout ==
The station had a single island platform and a side platform connected to the station building by a footbridge. The station had a "Midori no Madoguchi" staffed ticket office.

== History ==
Yamashita Station opened on May 10, 1949. The station was absorbed into the JR East network upon the privatization of the Japanese National Railways (JNR) on April 1, 1987.

Services on the Jōban Line between Hamayoshida Station and Soma Station were suspended due to damage caused by the 2011 Tōhoku earthquake and tsunami on 11 March 2011. The station reopened at a new location approximately 1 kilometer further inland on 10 December 10, 2016.

== Passenger statistics ==
In fiscal 2018, the station was used by an average of 598 passengers daily (boarding passengers only).

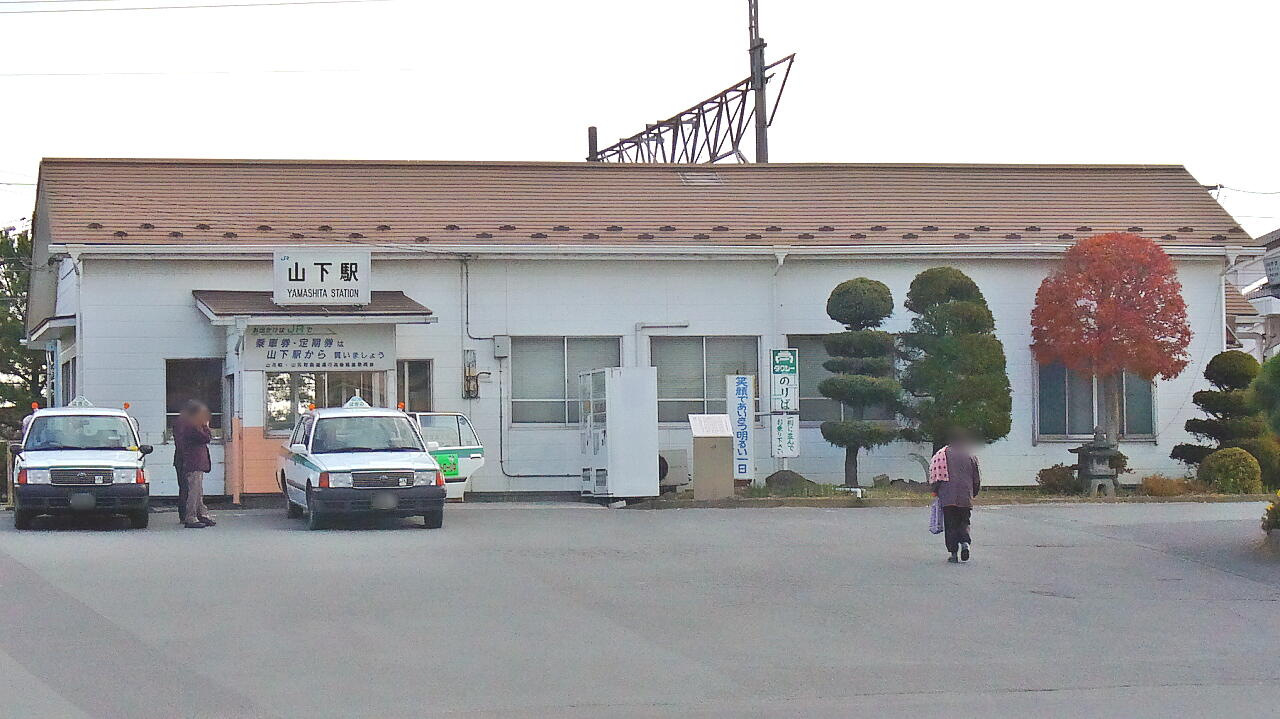
The former station building in December 2007

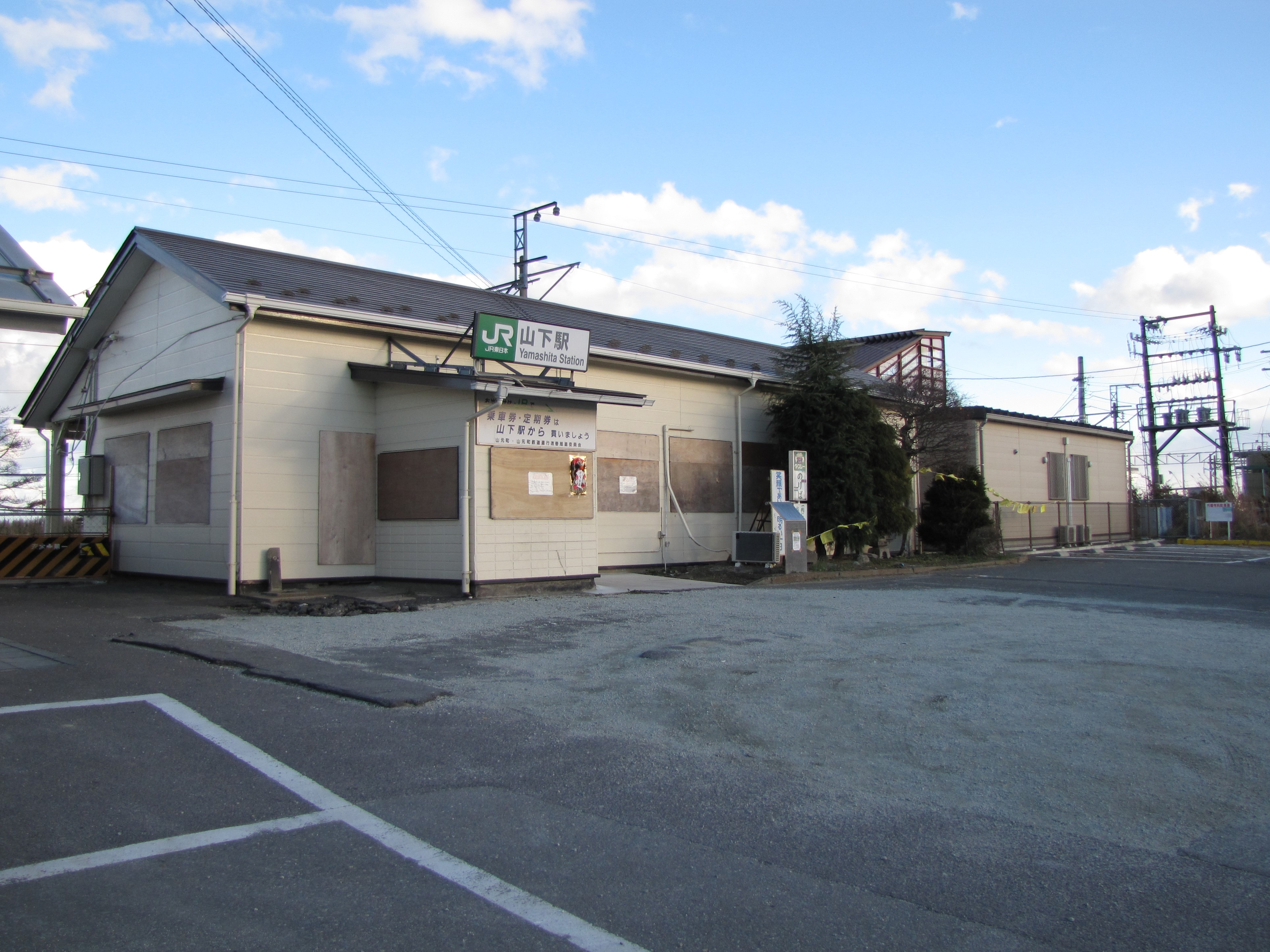
The closed station building in January 2013

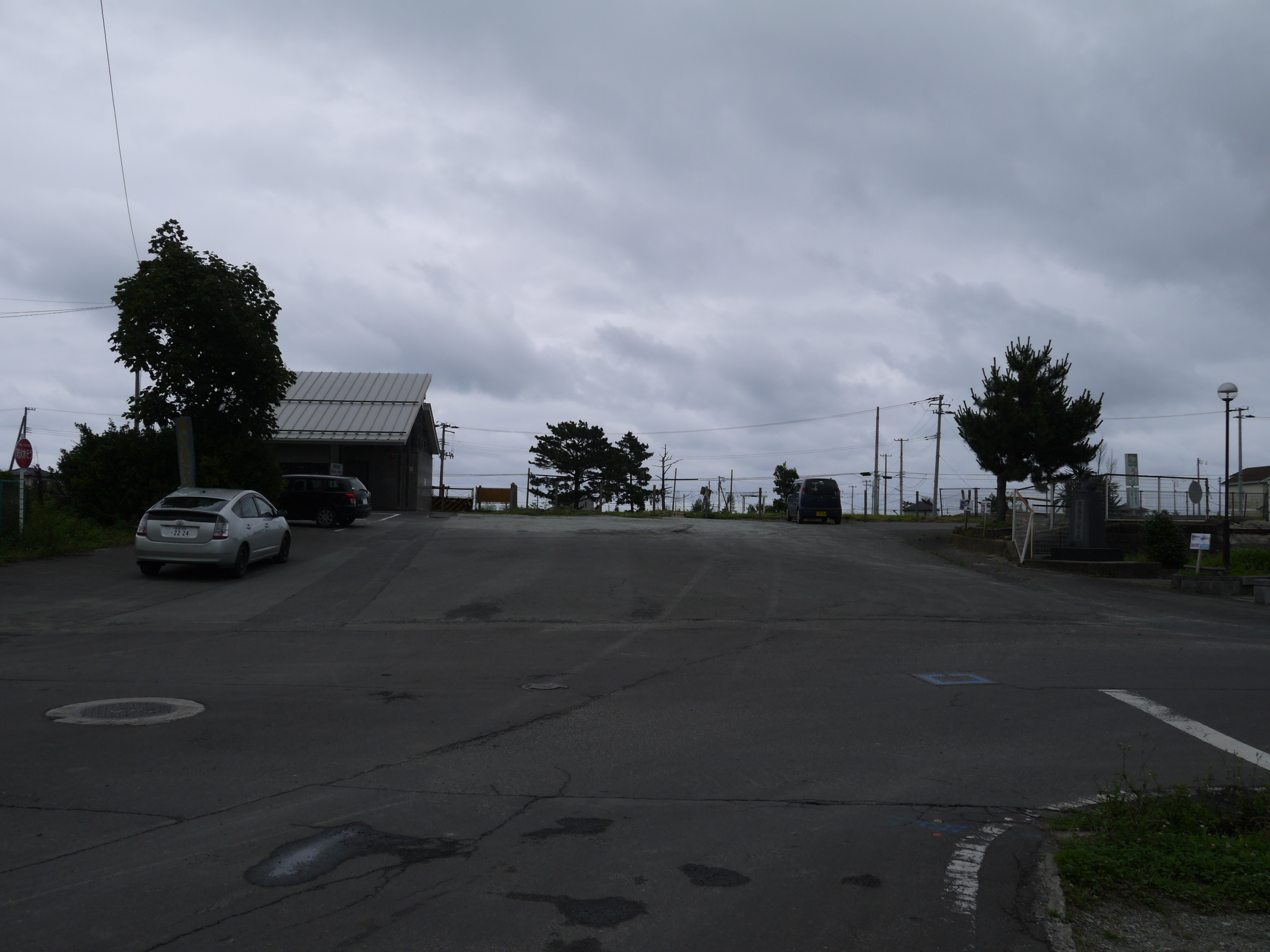
The remains of the former station in July 2016

== Surrounding area ==
- Yamamoto town hall

== See also ==
- List of railway stations in Japan
