= Watari Station (Miyagi) =

Railway station in Watari, Miyagi Prefecture, Japan

Watari Station 亘理駅
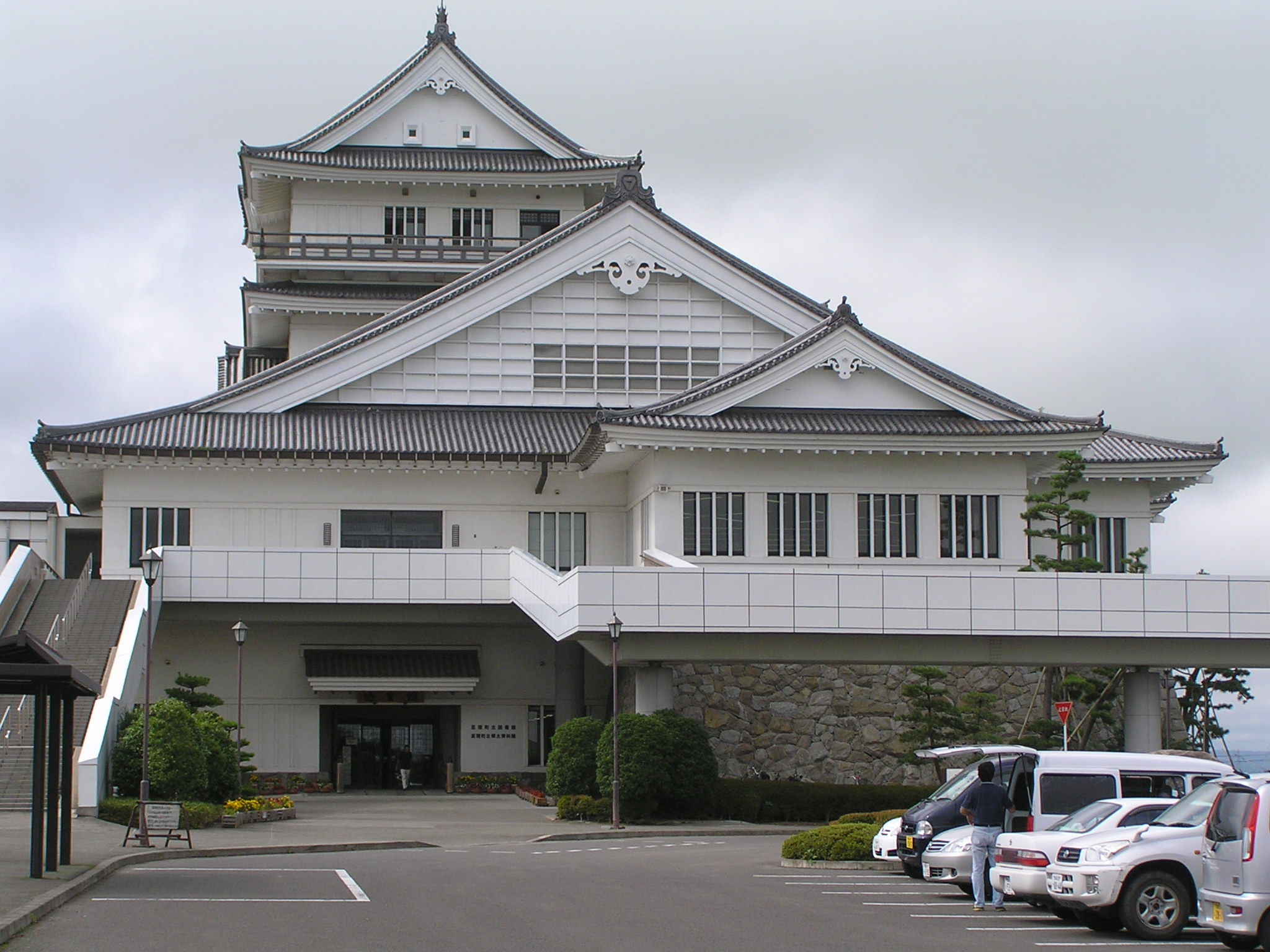
- Watari Station in December 2008

General information
- Location: Tanishi, Watari-machi, Watari-gun, Miyagi-ken 989-2351; Japan
- Coordinates: 38.0396°N 140.8613°E
- Operator: JR East
- Line: ■ Jōban Line
- Distance: 334.6 km from Nippori
- Platforms: 2 side platforms
- Tracks: 2

Other information
- Status: Staffed ("Midori no Madoguchi")
- Website: Official website

History
- Opened: 10 November 1897; 128 years ago

Passengers
- FY2018: 2130 daily

Services
Preceding station	JR East	Following station
Soma towards Shinagawa	Hitachi	Iwanuma towards Sendai
Hamayoshida towards Shinagawa	Jōban Line Local-Futsuu	Ōkuma towards Sendai
Location
- Location within Miyagi Prefecture Location within Japan

Watari Station (亘理駅, Watari-eki) is a railway station in the town of Watari, Miyagi Prefecture, Japan, operated by the East Japan Railway Company (JR East).

== Lines ==
Watari Station is served by the Jōban Line, and is located 334.6 rail kilometers from the official starting point of the line at Nippori in Tokyo.

== Station layout ==
The station has two opposed side platforms connected to the station building by a footbridge and a Midori no Madoguchi staffed ticket office.

=== Platforms ===
1	■ Jōban Line	for Iwanuma and Sendai for Haranomachi
2	■ Jōban Line	(currently not in use)

== History ==
Watari Station opened on 10 November 1897. The station was absorbed into the JR East network upon the privatization of the Japanese National Railways (JNR) on 1 April 1987. The station building was rebuilt in 2008 in the form of a faux Japanese castle, and incorporates the Watari Town Library and the Watari Local History Museum.

== Passenger statistics ==
In fiscal 2018, the JR East portion of the station was used by an average of 2,130 passengers daily (boarding passengers only).

== Surrounding area ==
- Watari Town Hall
- Watari Post Office

== See also ==
- List of railway stations in Japan
