= Sanjūsangendō Kanga ruins =

Heian archaeological site in Watari, Miyagi, Japan

Sanjusangendō Kanga ruins
- 三十三間堂官衙遺跡 (Japanese)
- Sanjusangendō Kanga ruins Sanjūsangendō Kanga ruins (Japan)
- 38°4′3.5″N 140°51′6.8″E
- Periods: Heian period
- Location: Watari, Miyagi, Japan
- Region: Tōhoku region

History
- Built: 9th - 10th century AD

Site notes
- Public access: Yes (no public facilities)

The Sanjusangendō Kanga ruins (三十三間堂官衙遺跡, Sanjusangendō Kanga iseki) is an archaeological site with the ruins of a Heian period government administrative complex located in what is now part of the town of Watari, Miyagi prefecture in the Tōhoku region of far northern Honshu, Japan. It is protected by the central government as a National Historic Site.

== Background ==
In the late Nara period, after the establishment of a centralized government under the Ritsuryō system, the imperial court sent a number of military expeditions to what is now the Tōhoku region of northern Japan to bring the local Emishi tribes under its control.

The site is believed to have been the location of the civil administration of Watari District in the Heian period. The name of Watari District appears in ancient records, including the Shoku Nihongi, Nihon Kōki and the Nihon Sandai Jitsuroku, and the site dates from the same 9th to the early 10th century . The site was excavated by the Miyagi Prefectural Board of Education (1986-1988), and by Watari Town (since 2002).

== Description ==
The ruins are located on the south bank of the Abukuma River in southern Miyagi Prefecture. The site consists of the remnants of a rectangular enclosure, approximately 180 meters east-west by 200 meters north-south, with remnants of a moat and earthen rampart, presumably surmounted by a wooden palisade. Inside the enclosure, there was a secondary wall 50 x 60 meters, containing the elevated foundation base of a large building.

There are traces of the gate on the east and south side of the palisade. Earthenware from the 9th century has been excavated from the south gate. To the south of the central complex were two long buildings, 6 meters east and west and 26 meters north and south, in symmetrical positions in the east and west, forming a “U”-shape. Both long buildings have been rebuilt once, and were presumably barracks. Up to ten warehouse ruins on the southern end the ruins were surrounded on all sides by a moat of about 150 meters wide. These warehouses were presumably for storing tax rice.

This arrangement was common to Heian period county administrative complexes in other parts of the country.

The ruins were backfilled after evacuation, and is nothing to be seen at the site today except for a commemorative stone marker. The site is about 10 minutes on foot from Ōkuma Station on the JR East Joban Line.

== See also ==
- Taga Castle
- Higashiyama Government Offices Site
- List of Historic Sites of Japan (Miyagi)
