= Ōkuma Station =

Railway station in Watari, Miyagi Prefecture, Japan

Ōkuma Station 逢隈駅
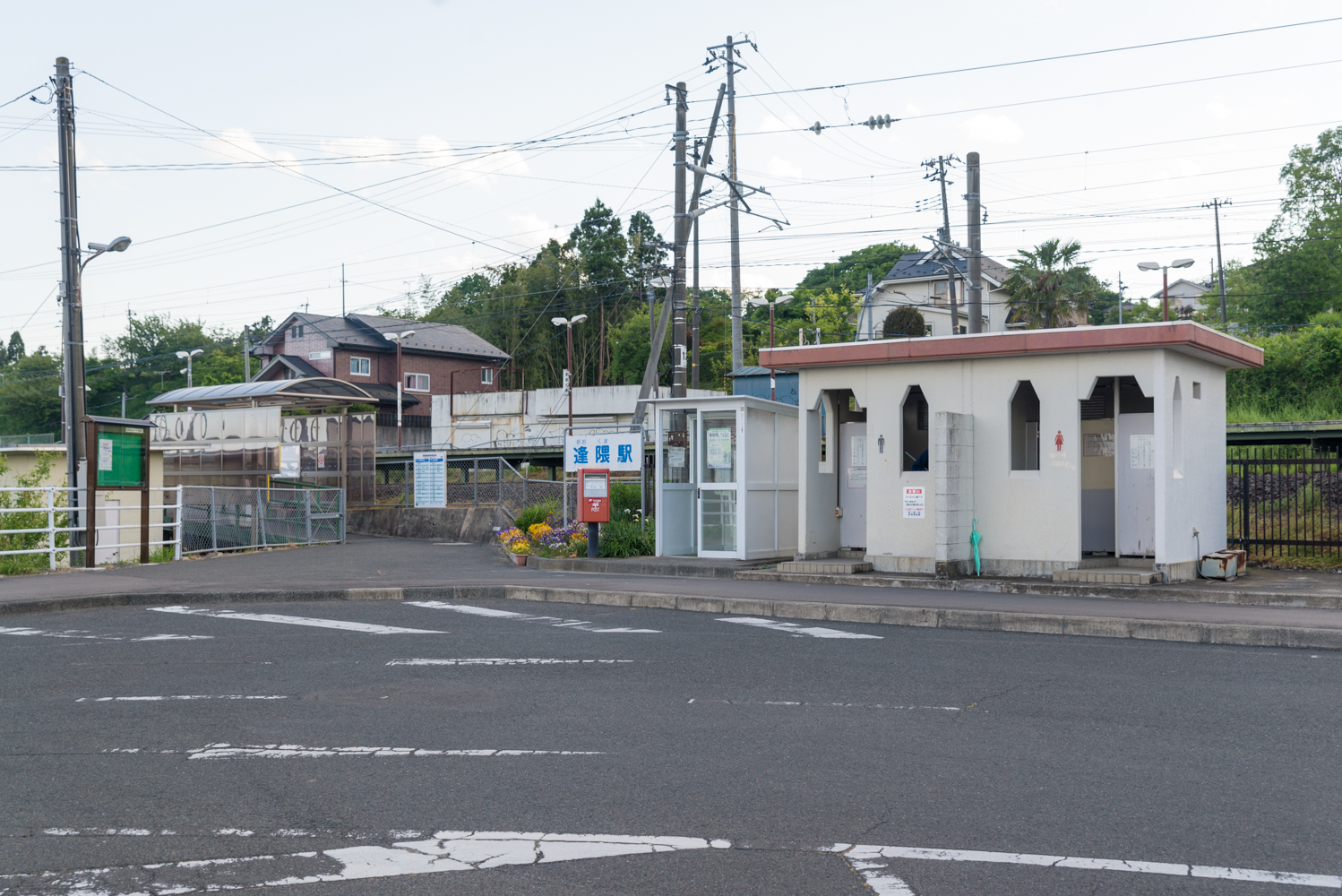
- Ōkuma Station entrance in May 2015

General information
- Location: Ōkumashimogōri, Watari-machi, Watari-gun, Miyagi-ken 989-2382; Japan
- Coordinates: 38.0678°N 140.8547°E
- Operator: JR East
- Line: ■ Joban Line
- Distance: 337.8 km from Nippori
- Platforms: 1 island platform
- Tracks: 2

Other information
- Status: Unstaffed
- Website: Official website

History
- Opened: 2 August 1988

Services
Preceding station	JR East	Following station
Watari towards Shinagawa	Jōban Line Local-Futsuu	Iwanuma towards Sendai
Location
- Location within Miyagi Prefecture Location within Japan

Ōkuma Station (逢隈駅, Ōkuma-eki) is a railway station in the town of Watari, Miyagi, Japan, operated by the East Japan Railway Company (JR East).

== Lines ==
Ōkuma Station is served by the Joban Line, and is located 337.8 km from the official starting point of the line at Nippori in Tokyo.

== Station layout ==
The station has one island platform connected to the station building by a footbridge. The station is not staffed.

=== Platforms ===
1	■ Jōban Line	for Haranomachi
2	■ Jōban Line	for Iwanuma and Sendai

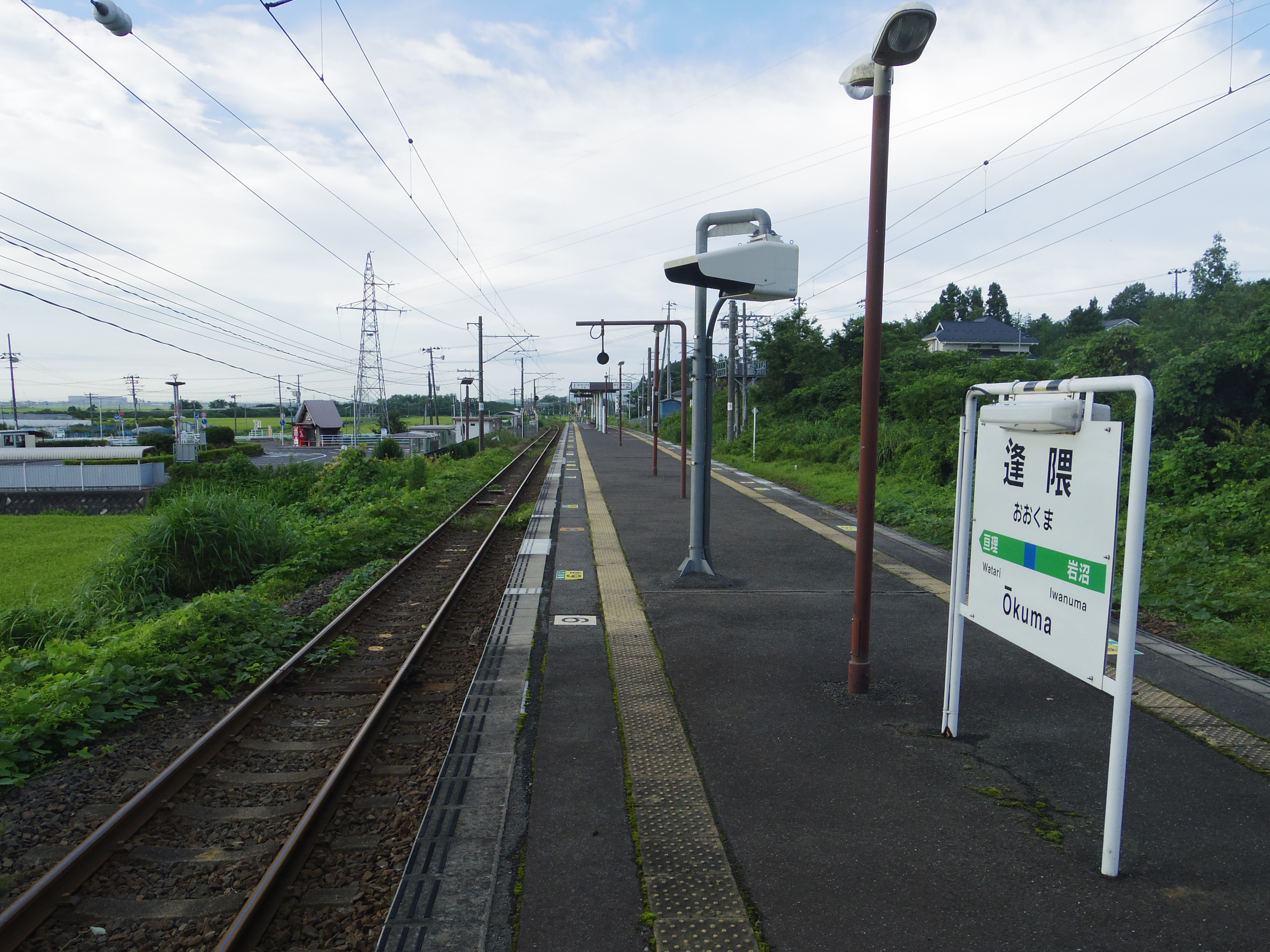
The platform in August 2014

== History ==
Ōkuma Station opened on August 2, 1988.

== Surrounding area ==
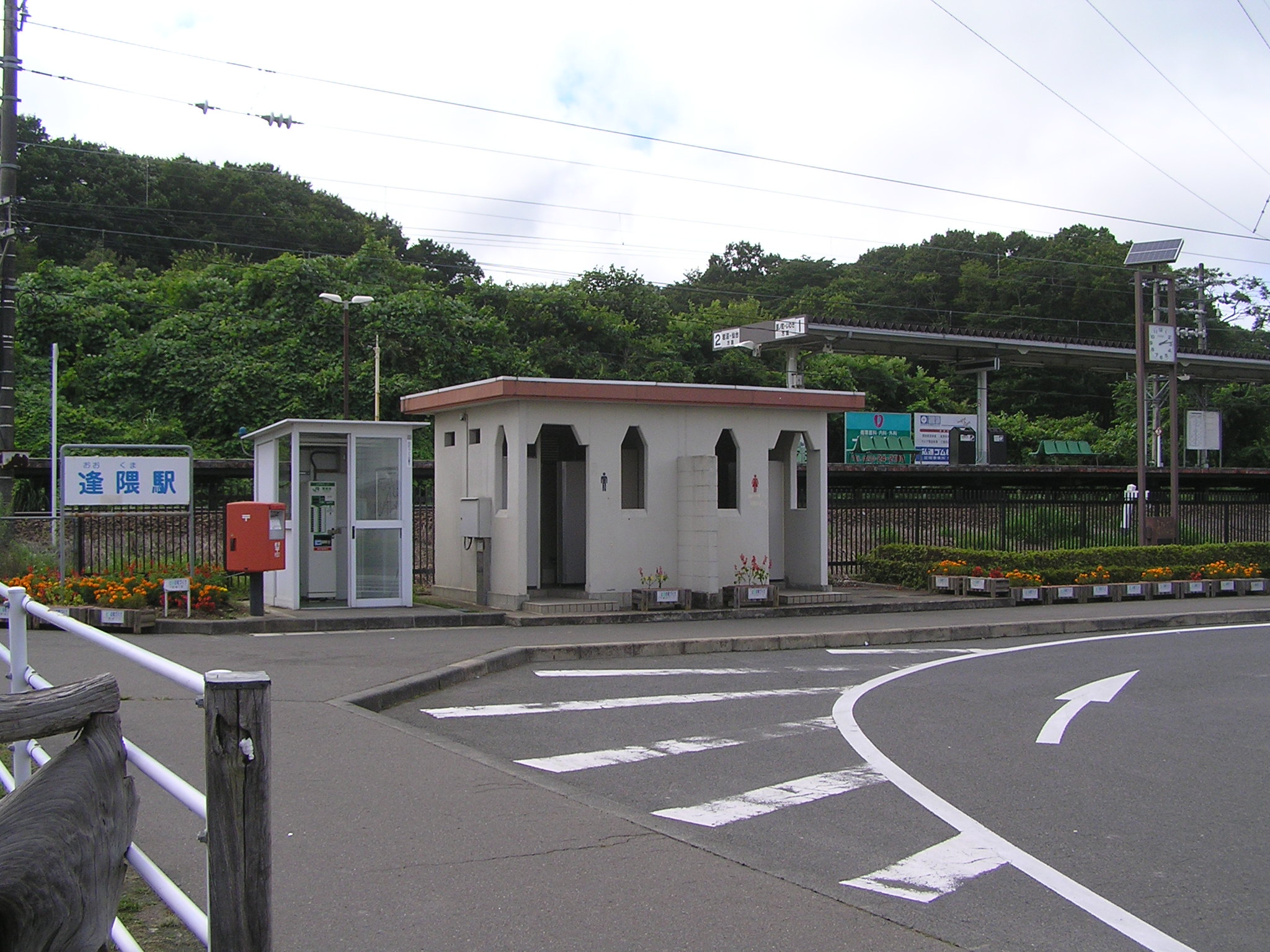
The toilets in front of the station in August 2006

- Former Ōkuma Town Hall
- Watari-Ōkuma Post Office
- Sanjūsangendō Kanga ruins

== See also ==
- List of railway stations in Japan
