= Yamamoto, Miyagi =

Yamamoto 山元町
- Town
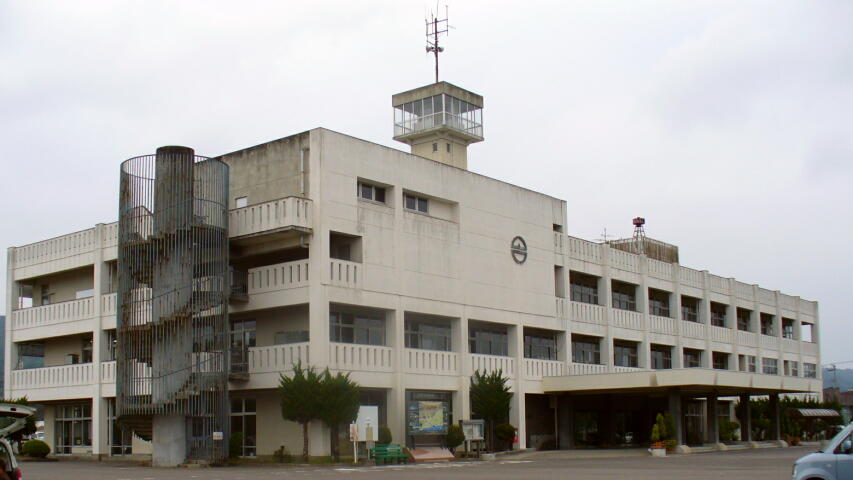
- Yamamoto Town Office

- Flag Seal

- Location of Yamamoto in Miyagi Prefecture

- Coordinates: 37°57′44.5″N 140°52′39″E
- Country: Japan
- Region: Tōhoku
- Prefecture: Miyagi
- District: Watari

Area
  - Total: 64.58 km^{2} (24.93 sq mi)

Population (October 10, 2020)
  - Total: 12,045
  - Density: 186.5/km^{2} (483.1/sq mi)
- Time zone: UTC+9 (Japan Standard Time)
- Tree: Japanese black pine
- Flower: Azalea
- Bird: Barn swallow
- Phone number: 0223-37-1111
- Address: Aasehara Sakutayama 31, Yamamoto-chō, Watari-gun, Miyagi-ken 989-2292
- Website: Official website

Yamamoto (山元町, Yamamoto-chō) is a town located in Miyagi Prefecture, Japan. As of 31 May 2020, the town had an estimated population of 12,100, and a population density of 190 persons per km^{2} in 4794 households. The total area of the town is 64.58 square kilometres (24.93 sq mi).

== Geography ==
Yamamoto is located in south-east Miyagi Prefecture in the Tōhoku region of northern Japan. It is bordered by the Pacific Ocean to the east, and Fukushima Prefecture to the south.

=== Neighboring municipalities ===
Fukushima Prefecture

- Shinchi

Miyagi Prefecture

- Kakuda
- Marumori
- Watari

=== Climate ===
Yamamoto has a humid subtropical climate (Köppen climate classification Cfa) characterized by mild summers and cold winters. The average annual temperature in Yamamoto is 12.6 °C. The average annual rainfall is 1252 mm with September as the wettest month. The temperatures are highest on average in August, at around 24.8 °C, and lowest in January, at around 1.7 °C.

== Demographics ==
Per Japanese census data, the population of Yamamoto peaked at around the year 2000, and has dropped rapidly since, especially since the 2011 Tōhoku earthquake.

Historical population
| Year | Pop. | ±% |
|---|---|---|
| 1920 | 10,615 | — |
| 1930 | 12,037 | +13.4% |
| 1940 | 12,967 | +7.7% |
| 1950 | 18,370 | +41.7% |
| 1960 | 16,547 | −9.9% |
| 1970 | 14,820 | −10.4% |
| 1980 | 17,630 | +19.0% |
| 1990 | 18,268 | +3.6% |
| 2000 | 18,537 | +1.5% |
| 2010 | 16,704 | −9.9% |
| 2020 | 12,045 | −27.9% |

== History ==
The area of present-day Yamamoto was part of ancient Mutsu Province and was part of the holdings of Sendai Domain under the Edo period Tokugawa shogunate. The village of Yamamoto was established on April 1, 1889, with the establishment of a post-Meiji restoration modern municipalities system. It was raised to town status on February 1, 1951, by merging with the neighboring village of Sakamoto.

Yamamoto was devastated by the 9–9.1 moment magnitude scale (M_{w}) 2011 Tōhoku earthquake (Shindo 6+) off the coast of Japan that occurred at 14:46 JST (05:46 UTC) on 11 March 2011 and resultant tsunami. Eyewitness accounts describe Yamamoto as "one of the worst-hit areas" with no houses left undamaged. On February 13, 2021, Yamamoto was again hit by a M7.3 earthquake that struck off the coast of Fukushima prefecture, with a Shindo 6- rating, though some record the shaking as Shindo 7.

== Government ==
Yamamoto has a mayor-council form of government with a directly elected mayor and a unicameral town council of 13 members. Yamamoto and the town of Watari together contribute two seats to the Miyagi Prefectural legislature. In terms of national politics, the town is part of Miyagi 3rd district of the lower house of the Diet of Japan.

== Economy ==
The economy of Yamamoto is largely based on agriculture and commercial fishing.

== Education ==
Yamamoto has four public elementary schools and two public middle schools operated by the town government. The town does not have a public high school; however, there is a special education school for the handicapped operated by the Miyagi Prefectural Board of Education.

== Transportation ==
=== Railway ===
East Japan Railway Company (JR East) - Jōban Line

- Sakamoto - Yamashita

=== Highway ===
- Jōban Expressway
- National Route 6

== Noted people from Yamamoto ==
- Makoto Kosaka, professional baseball player
- Keita Saito, professional football player
