= Hamayoshida Station =

Railway station in Watari, Miyagi Prefecture, Japan

Hamayoshida Station 浜吉田駅
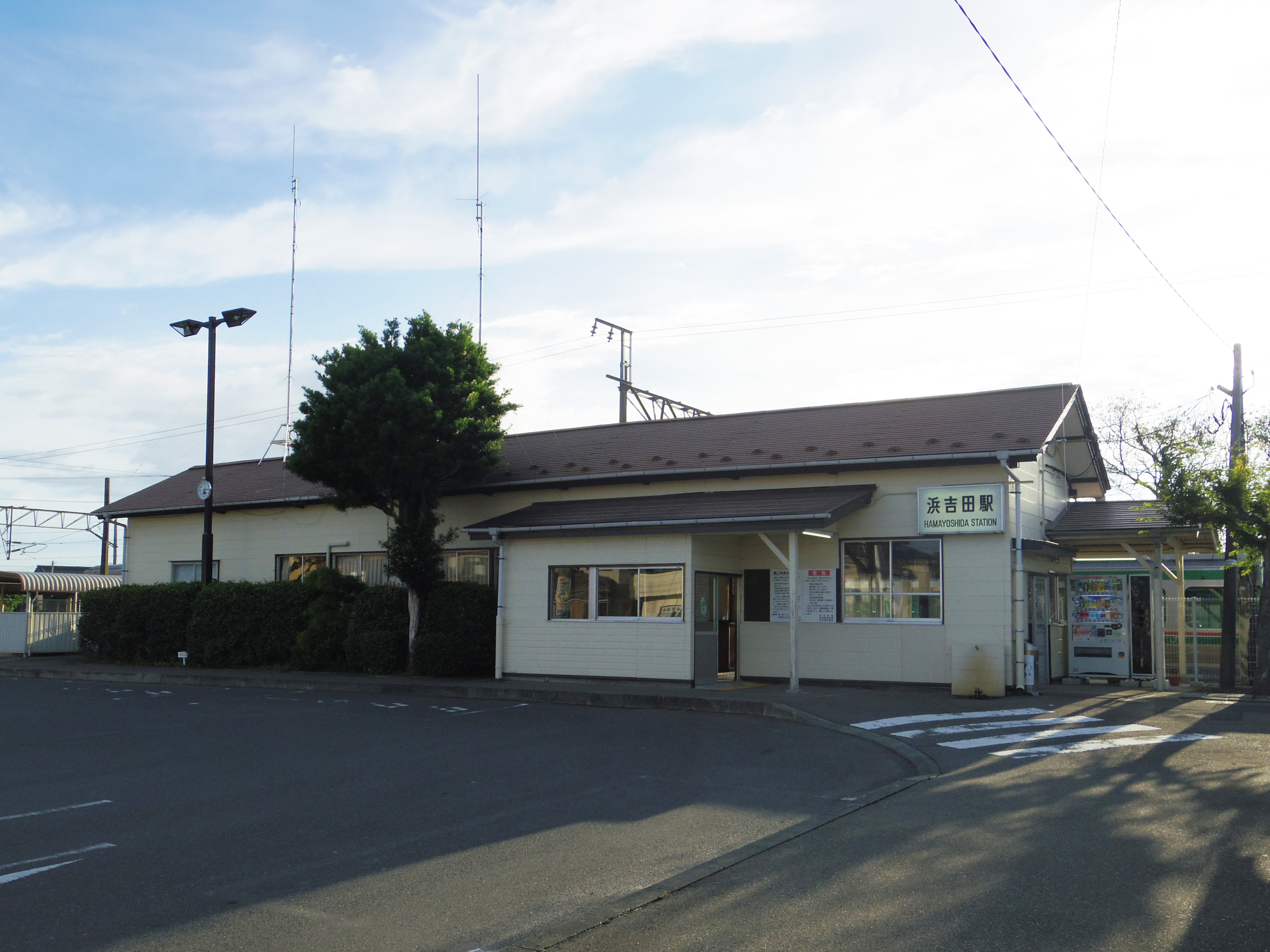
- Hamayoshida Station in August 2014

General information
- Location: Yoshida, Watari-machi, Watari-gun, Miyagi-ken 989-2331; Japan
- Coordinates: 38.0023°N 140.8899°E
- Operator: JR East
- Line: ■ Jōban Line
- Distance: 329.6 km from Nippori
- Platforms: 2 side platforms
- Tracks: 2

Other information
- Status: Staffed
- Website: Official website

History
- Opened: November 10, 1897
- Former names: Yoshida (until 1915)

Passengers
- FY2020: 399 daily

Services
Preceding station	JR East	Following station
Yamashita towards Shinagawa	Jōban Line Local-Futsuu	Watari towards Sendai
Location
- Location within Miyagi Prefecture Location within Japan

Hamayoshida Station (浜吉田駅, Hamayoshida-eki) is a railway station in the town of Watari, Miyagi, Japan, operated by East Japan Railway Company (JR East).

== Lines ==
Hamayoshida Station is served by the Jōban Line, and is located 329.6 kilometers from the official starting point of the line at Nippori in Tokyo.

== Station layout ==
The station has two opposed side platforms connected to the station building by a footbridge. The station is staffed.

== History ==
The station opened on November 10, 1897 as Yoshida Station (吉田駅). It was renamed Hamayoshida on June 1, 1915. The station was absorbed into the JR East network upon the privatization of Japanese National Railways (JNR) on April 1, 1987. Following severe damage in the 2011 Tōhoku earthquake and tsunami, operations on the Joban Line between Hamayoshida Station and Soma Station were suspended until December 10, 2016.

== Passenger statistics ==
In fiscal 2018, the station was used by an average of 504 passengers daily (boarding passengers only).

== Surrounding area ==
- Hamayoshida Post Office

== See also ==
- List of railway stations in Japan
