= Tōkai Nature Trail =

Hiking trail in Japan

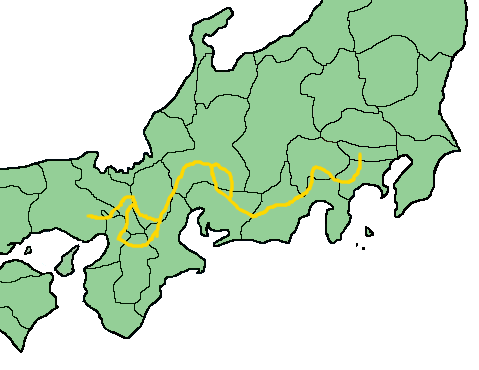
The approximate location of the trail (in yellow).

The Tōkai Nature Trail (東海自然歩道, Tōkai Shizen Hodō) is a long-distance walkway that traverses 11 prefectures and covers 1,697 kilometres (1,054 mi), running from Meiji no Mori Takao Quasi-National Park in Tokyo to Meiji no Mori Minō Quasi-National Park in Osaka Prefecture. Hiking the entire trail usually takes 40 to 50 days.

In 1969, the former Minister of Health, Labor, and Welfare (current Minister of the Environment), proposed establishing a long-distance hiking trail. In 1970, with cooperation of related local governments, the construction project began, and was completed in 1974. Subsequently, the idea of connecting two quasi-national parks gave rise to constructing an array of additional quasi-national parks along the path. Numerous hills, wetlands, and canyons, which had not previously been viewed as tourist spots were designated as quasi-national parks and presently serve as nature preserves.

== Points of interest ==
=== Tokyo ===
The first leg of the route goes through the Mount Takao area and offers a nice hiking trip starting at Keiō Line Takaosanguchi Station and reaching JR Sagamiko Station. Roughly four hours is expected to cover this segment of the walkway.

From the Takaosanguchi Station, the route climbs through slopes of Mount Takao and first reaches the Takaosan Viewing Tower. After Takaoyakuō-ji Temple, the trail connects to the summit, where the Takao Visitor Center awaits. Passing through an aisle of cherry trees, the hiker next arrives at Hachiōji Castle. From this point, the path descends to the flood plain of the Sagami River. Crossing Benten Bridge, the walkway leads to Sagami Dam to Sagami Station.

==== Mount Takao ====
Mount Takao, rising 599 m above sea level, is an excellent place for wild landscapes with a wide variety of plants (1,600 species) and insects (6,000 species). The area offers many hiking trails and view points.

The Takao Visitor Center is located at the summit, dedicated to offering information on the history and environment of the region. At 599 m, the site offers a majestic vista of mountains from Mount Fuji to Tanzawa.

==== Takaoyakuō-ji ====
Takaoyakuō-ji is a Buddhist temple situated on Mount Takao. Its full name is Takao-san Yakuō-in Yūki-ji. It was built by Gyōki on the command of Emperor Shōmu. The site had formerly been considered a holy mountain and attracted many Shugendōshi, Japanese mountain ascetic hermits practicing the strict doctrine of Shugendō. The temple was named “yakuō,” for it enshrines Yakushi. The temple offers a glimpse of Shinbutsu shūgō, the fusion of Buddhism and Shinto, as it contains Shinto style buildings and Torii.

==== Hachiōji Castle ====
Hachiōji Castle is a yamashiro, a castle built on a mountain. It is situated on Shiro-yama (445m) in Hachiōji, Tokyo. The castle measures roughly 2 km from east to west and 1 km from north to south. The structure made use of the mountain's complex surfaces of steep ridges and deep valleys and was divided into a few areas. It was first built by Hōjō Ujiteru in 1587. In 1590, the fortress fell when attacked by Maeda Toshiie, Sanada Masayuki, and Uesugi Kagekatsu during the Toyotomi Hideyoshi’s campaign to eliminate the Hōjō clan. Currently, the site features a reconstructed bridge and parts of the main palace, along with kuruwa, stone walls, and moats.

=== Kanagawa Prefecture ===
In Kanagawa Prefecture, the course starts at Mt. Shiroyama(Kobotoke Shiroyama) on borders with Tokyo Prefecture. Then it leads down through Kobotoke Pass to Lake Sagami, and subsequently ascends into the Tanzawa mountains. Although bypasses the main ridge, this part of the trail goes through many peaks over 1200m (with the highest being Mt. Sodehirayama), and is considered to be the steepest and hardest part of the whole trail. After 127.5 kilometers, the course in Kanagawa Prefecture ends at Kiridooshi Pass on the border with Yamanashi Prefecture.

Main orientation points on the route (including altitude):

- Mt. Shiroyama (672m)
- Mt. Arashiyama (406m)
- Mt. Sekirouzan (694m)
- Nishinono village (303m)
- Mt. Kibigarayama (1273m)
- Mt. Sodehirayama (1432m)
- Inugoeji Pass (950m)
- Houkizawa village (494m)
- Mt. Azegamaru (1293m)
- Mt. Komotsurushiyama (1348m)
- Mt. Takasasuyama (1174m)
- Kiridooshi Pass (1080m)

=== Yamanashi Prefecture ===
In Yamanashi Prefecture, the trail starts at Kiridooshi Pass at the western end of Tanzawa mountains. Then it encircles the northern slope of Mt. Fuji, passing along attractive tourist spots like 8 Springs of Mt. Fuji and Fuji Five Lakes. From Motosu Lake, the route briefly enters Shizuoka Prefecture via Wariishi Pass, going through Asagiri Plateau and along Lake Tanuki, where it returns to Yamanashi Prefecture with a climb to Mt. Choujagadake in Tenshi Mountains. After 115 km, the trail leaves Yamanashi Prefecture at Tashiro Pass.

Main orientation points along the route (including altitudes):

- Kiridooshi Pass (1080m)
- Mt. Oohirayama (1295m)
- Oshino Hakkai (8 springs of Mt. Fuji) (928m)
- Fuji Visitor Center (870m)
- Mt. Ashiwadayama/Gokodai (1355m)
- Wariishi Pass (978m)
- Mt. Choujagadake (1336m)
- Mt. Shishinzan (1031m)
- Minobu Line Ide Station (148m)
- Tashiro Pass (1020m)

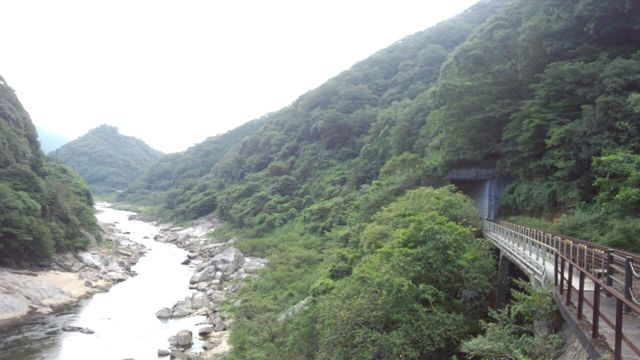
Tōkai Nature Trail in Kyoto, Kasagi town
