= Watari, Miyagi =

Watari 亘理町
- Town
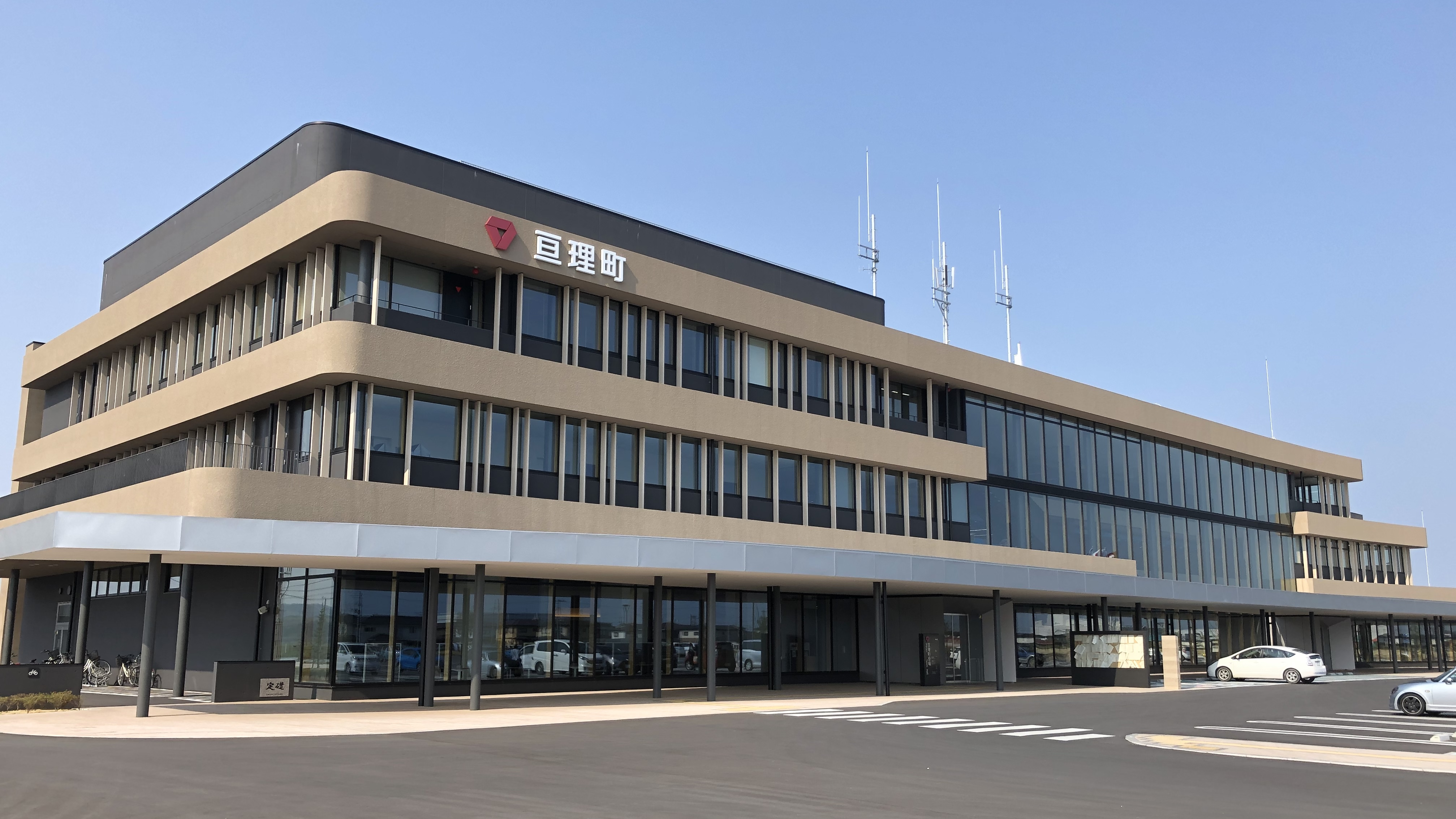
- Watari Town hall

- Flag Seal

- Location of Watari in Miyagi Prefecture

- Coordinates: 38°02′16″N 140°51′9.3″E
- Country: Japan
- Region: Tōhoku
- Prefecture: Miyagi
- District: Watari

Area
  - Total: 73.60 km^{2} (28.42 sq mi)

Population (May 31, 2020)
  - Total: 33,459
  - Density: 454.6/km^{2} (1,177/sq mi)
- Time zone: UTC+9 (Japan Standard Time)
- Phone number: 0223-34-0502
- Address: 7-4 Shimokoji, Watari-chō, Watari-gun, Miyagi-ken 989-2393
- Climate: Cfa
- Website: Official website
- Symbols
- Flower: Camellia sasanqua
- Tree: Pinus thunbergii

Watari (亘理町, Watari-chō) is a town located in Miyagi Prefecture, Japan. As of 31 March 2020, the town had an estimated population of 33,459, and a population density of 450 persons per km^{2} in 12,643 households. The total area of the town is 73.60 square kilometres (28.42 sq mi).

== Geography ==
Watari is located in the Tōhoku region of northern Japan, in the southeastern Miyagi Prefecture, bordered by the Pacific Ocean to the east. The Abukuma River flows through the town, forming its western border.

=== Neighboring municipalities ===
Miyagi Prefecture

- Iwanuma
- Kakuda
- Shibata
- Yamamoto

=== Climate ===
Watari has a humid subtropical climate (Köppen climate classification Cfa) characterized by mild summers and cold winters. The average annual temperature in Watari is 12.4 °C (54.3 °F). The average annual rainfall is 1,272.2 mm (50.09 in) with September as the wettest month. The temperatures are highest on average in August, at around 23.9 °C (75.0 °F), and lowest in January, at around 1.8 °C (35.2 °F).

Climate data for Watari (1991−2020 normals, extremes 1976−present)
| Month | Jan | Feb | Mar | Apr | May | Jun | Jul | Aug | Sep | Oct | Nov | Dec | Year |
|---|---|---|---|---|---|---|---|---|---|---|---|---|---|
| Record high °C (°F) | 17.4 (63.3) | 20.2 (68.4) | 25.2 (77.4) | 30.2 (86.4) | 30.8 (87.4) | 32.8 (91.0) | 36.1 (97.0) | 36.0 (96.8) | 34.4 (93.9) | 29.5 (85.1) | 26.1 (79.0) | 20.8 (69.4) | 36.1 (97.0) |
| Mean daily maximum °C (°F) | 6.1 (43.0) | 6.7 (44.1) | 10.1 (50.2) | 15.3 (59.5) | 19.7 (67.5) | 22.4 (72.3) | 25.8 (78.4) | 27.5 (81.5) | 24.6 (76.3) | 19.7 (67.5) | 14.3 (57.7) | 8.8 (47.8) | 16.8 (62.2) |
| Daily mean °C (°F) | 1.8 (35.2) | 2.2 (36.0) | 5.2 (41.4) | 10.3 (50.5) | 15.2 (59.4) | 18.7 (65.7) | 22.4 (72.3) | 23.9 (75.0) | 20.6 (69.1) | 15.2 (59.4) | 9.4 (48.9) | 4.3 (39.7) | 12.4 (54.4) |
| Mean daily minimum °C (°F) | −2.5 (27.5) | −2.3 (27.9) | 0.3 (32.5) | 5.2 (41.4) | 11.0 (51.8) | 15.6 (60.1) | 19.7 (67.5) | 21.0 (69.8) | 17.2 (63.0) | 11.1 (52.0) | 4.6 (40.3) | −0.1 (31.8) | 8.4 (47.1) |
| Record low °C (°F) | −13.0 (8.6) | −11.6 (11.1) | −6.4 (20.5) | −4.9 (23.2) | 2.9 (37.2) | 7.9 (46.2) | 12.3 (54.1) | 12.7 (54.9) | 7.7 (45.9) | 0.9 (33.6) | −3.8 (25.2) | −7.3 (18.9) | −13.0 (8.6) |
| Average precipitation mm (inches) | 45.3 (1.78) | 33.3 (1.31) | 71.7 (2.82) | 86.6 (3.41) | 104.7 (4.12) | 133.1 (5.24) | 180.7 (7.11) | 154.9 (6.10) | 202.6 (7.98) | 164.0 (6.46) | 58.0 (2.28) | 37.3 (1.47) | 1,272.2 (50.09) |
| Average precipitation days (≥ 1.0 mm) | 5.3 | 5.1 | 7.7 | 8.1 | 9.4 | 11.7 | 13.8 | 11.5 | 12.1 | 8.8 | 5.8 | 5.5 | 104.8 |
| Mean monthly sunshine hours | 153.2 | 158.2 | 183.4 | 190.6 | 190.1 | 146.0 | 132.9 | 155.9 | 131.2 | 144.9 | 145.5 | 146.4 | 1,881.1 |
Source: Japan Meteorological Agency

== Demographics ==
Per Japanese census data, the population of Watari has remained relatively steady since the turn of the 21st century.

Historical population
| Year | Pop. | ±% |
|---|---|---|
| 1920 | 17,791 | — |
| 1930 | 20,606 | +15.8% |
| 1940 | 21,262 | +3.2% |
| 1950 | 28,939 | +36.1% |
| 1960 | 27,277 | −5.7% |
| 1970 | 25,141 | −7.8% |
| 1980 | 27,822 | +10.7% |
| 1990 | 30,301 | +8.9% |
| 2000 | 34,770 | +14.7% |
| 2010 | 34,854 | +0.2% |
| 2020 | 33,087 | −5.1% |

== History ==
The area of present-day Watari was part of ancient Mutsu Province, and the place name of "Watari" appears in the Shoku Nihongi chronicles dated 718 AD. It was part of the holdings of Sendai Domain under the Edo period Tokugawa shogunate.

Watari Town was established on April 1, 1889 with the establishment of the post-Meiji restoration modern municipalities system. It merged with the neighboring town of Arahama and villages of Yoshida and Õkuma on February 1, 1955.

Watari was severely damaged by a tsunami caused by an earthquake on 11 March 2011. Hundreds of people were stranded in a school but were airlifted from the roof by Japanese military helicopters. The tsunami covered 47% of the town's area and 305 residents were reported killed or missing.

== Government ==
Watari has a mayor-council form of government with a directly elected mayor and a unicameral town council of 18 members. Watari contributes one seat to the Miyagi Prefectural legislature. In terms of national politics, the town is part of Miyagi 3rd district of the lower house of the Diet of Japan.

== Economy ==
The economy of Watari is largely based on agriculture (strawberries) and commercial fishing and fish processing.

== Education ==
Watari has six public elementary schools and four public middle schools operated by the town government, and one public high school operated by the Miyagi Prefectural Board of Education.

== Transportation ==
=== Railway ===
East Japan Railway Company (JR East) - Jōban Line

  - Hamayoshida - Watari - Ōkuma

=== Highway ===
- Jōban Expressway – Torinoumi Interchange and Parking Area – Watari Interchange
- Sendai-Tōbu Road – Watari Interchange
- National Route 6

== Local attractions ==
- Sanjūsangendō Kanga ruins, Heian period National Historic Site
- Watari Jinja (site of Watari Castle)
