= Meiji no Mori Takao Quasi-National Park =

Quasi-national park around Mount Takao in Tokyo, Japan

Coordinates: 35.631088°N 139.268814°E

- 明治の森高尾国定公園
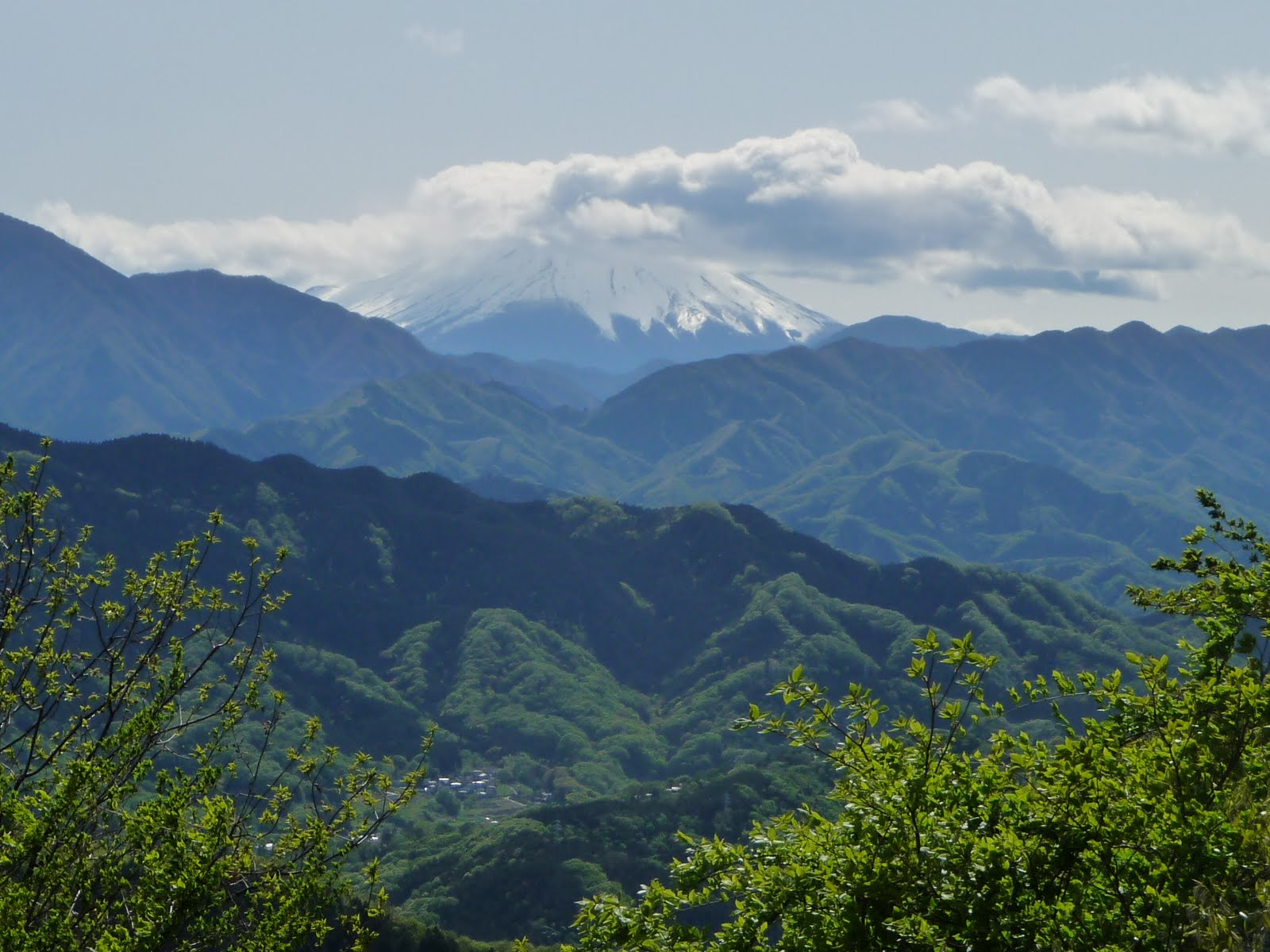
- Mount Fuji viewed from Mount Takao
- Interactive map of Meiji no Mori Takao Quasi-National Park
- Location: Tokyo, Japan
- Area: 7.77 km^{2} (3.00 sq mi)
- Established: 11 December 1967

Meiji no Mori Takao Quasi-National Park (明治の森高尾国定公園, Meiji no Mori Takao Kokutei Kōen) is located around Mount Takao in Hachiōji, Tokyo, Japan. Established in 1967 to commemorate the centennial of the accession of Emperor Meiji, it is the smallest of the Quasi-National Parks. Next in size is the coeval Meiji no Mori Minō Quasi-National Park in Ōsaka Prefecture, to which the park is connected by the Tōkai Nature Trail.

Mount Takao, rising to 599 m above sea level, is a massif of low mountains formed in the Mesozoic era. The area is dense with pristine forests of momi fir, Japanese red pine, and Japanese beech, protected as part of the grounds of the Takaosan Yakuōin Temple (高尾山薬王院). The area is a celebrated habitat of a wide variety of birds and insects.

== See also ==
- List of national parks of Japan
- Meiji period
