= Mount Takao =

Mountain in Tokyo, Japan

- 高尾山
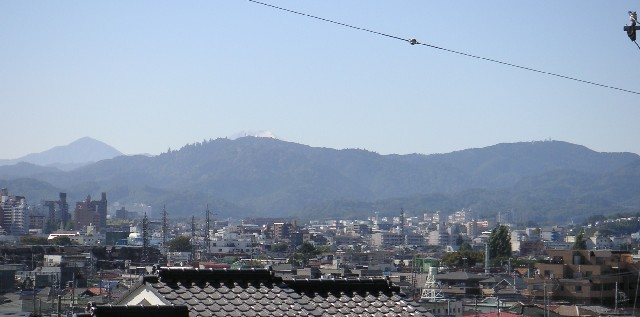

Highest point
- Elevation: 599 m (1,965 ft)
- Coordinates: 35°37′31″N 139°14′37″E

Geography
- Location within Japan
- Location: Hachiōji, Tokyo, Japan

Climbing
- Easiest route: Chairlift or funicular or hiking

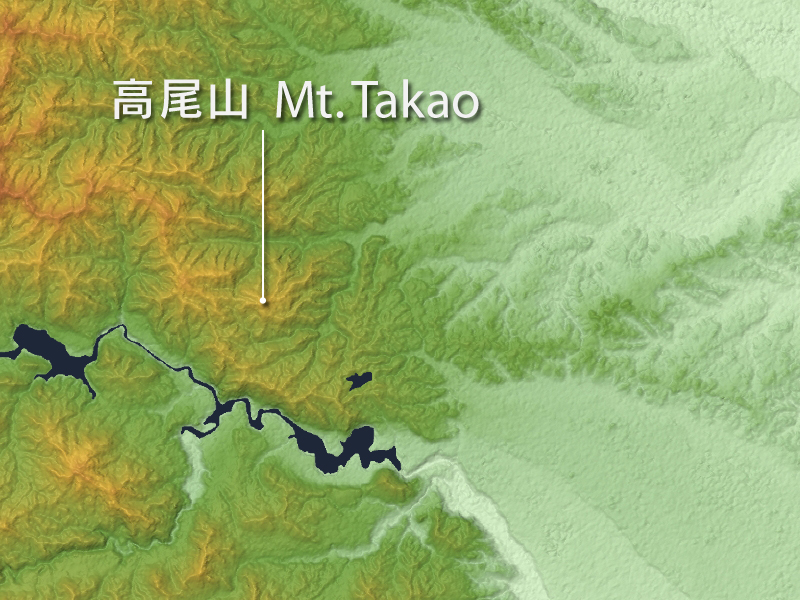
Relief Map

Mount Takao (高尾山, Takao-san) is a mountain in the city of Hachiōji, Tokyo, Japan. It is protected within Meiji no Mori Takao Quasi-National Park.

Standing 599 metres (1,965 ft) tall and located within an hour of downtown Tokyo, it is a popular hiking spot, with eight hiking trails and more than 2.5 million annual visitors. The Tama Forest Science Garden is also located at the mountain's base.

Mount Takao is closely associated with the Shinto-Buddhist tengu, supernatural creatures from Japanese folklore. The mountain is also renowned for Shugendō, the mountain asceticism focusing on strict discipline. A Buddhist temple, Takaosan Yakuōin Yūkiji, is located on the mountain, and attracts many visitors who pray to the tengu for good fortune. The temple belongs to the Shingon Buddhist sect.

== Hiking ==
Hiking to the top of Mount Takao takes an average of 90 minutes, but the time may vary depending on the method used to climb the mountain. Visitors to Mount Takao can choose to start climbing from the base, or take a funicular or ropeway ride halfway up the mountain. The Takaotozan Railway operates both of these services. The system nominally has four stations—two each for the funicular and the ropeway. However, the distance between the pairs of stations is only a few dozen metres (at the base of the mountain) and approximately 150 metres (at the top of the services, which are themselves about a 30-minute scenic uphill walk from the top of Mount Takao itself), so they can essentially both be thought of as coming from and going to the same place.

Some visitors to Mount Takao bypass the Takaotozan Railway services entirely. Trail 1 from the base of the mountain is a somewhat arduous climb, but it is paved and leads past the top stations of both the ropeway and the funicular on the way to the summit. Trail 6 and the "Inariyama Trail" are unpaved trails that start from the base of the mountain and go all the way to the summit, but they do not pass the ropeway and funicular top stations. Past the summit lies a larger network of hiking trails, many of which connect to the many peaks of the nearby Chichibu Tama Kai National Park. Some visitors to Takao ride up the mountain and then walk back down. The peak summit of Mount Takao is relatively small in comparison to that of the well-known Mount Fuji.

One end of the Tōkai Nature Trail is at Mount Takao, at the Takaosan-guchi Station. The other end is at Minoh, near Osaka. Sites including a suspension bridge found along Trail 4 and numerous waterfalls (such as the Biwa Falls, found on Trail 6) are scattered along the numerous trails. On Trail 1, hundred-year-old cedars line the path, including Takosugi, the famous octopus cedar, with a height of 37 meters and a circumference of about 19 feet. This enormous tree is estimated to be around 500 years old. Along with cable cars and chair lifts, Mount Takao has several stores and sweet shops. There are a total of three observation decks scattered along Trail 1. A monkey park is located on Trail 1, just past the first observation deck. At the base of the mountain, one can enjoy a soak in the Keio Takaosan Onsen Gokurakuyu, or visit the 599 Museum, which focuses on the ecology surrounding Mount Takao. In addition to Mount Takao's most popular temple, Takaosan Yakuōin Yūkiji, many other shrines and statues are scattered throughout the mountain. Most are dedicated to the tengu, considered to be guardians of the mountain, but several are dedicated to the Buddha and other Buddhist and Shinto figures. While many people explore Mount Takao during the day, visitors can also hike the mountain at night as Trail 1 is lined with lanterns.

== Wildlife ==
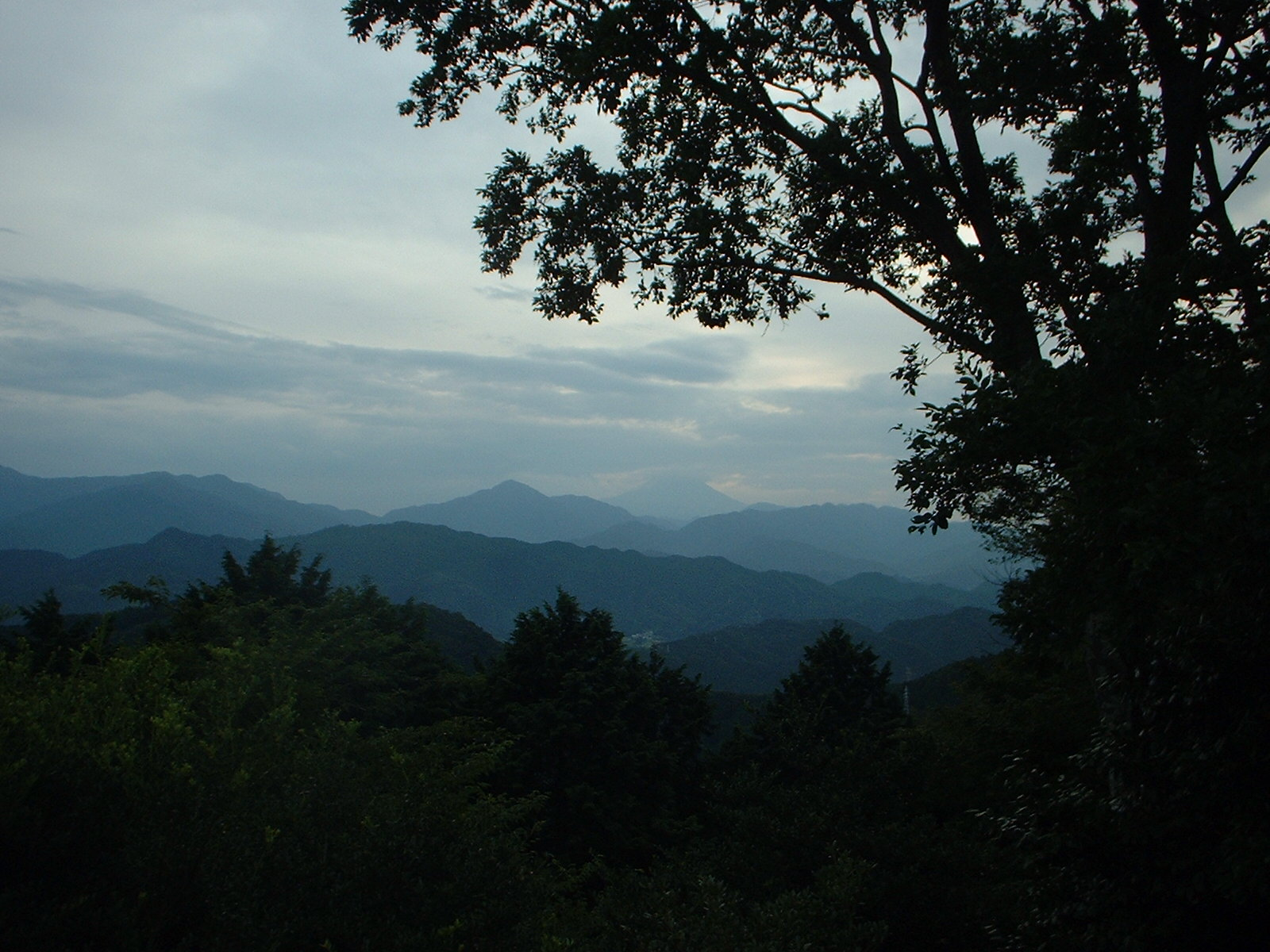
View from Mount Takao

Mount Takao is also located near the boundary line between the warm-temperature zone and cool-temperature zone, therefore diverse vegetation covers the mountain. Despite the mountain's proximity to the metropolis of Tokyo, Mount Takao is rich in wildlife, with more than 1,200 species of plants and a wide variety of native animals and insects, including wild boars and monkeys. This diversity was under threat from the construction of the Ken-Ō Expressway, which involved the drilling of two 10 m tunnels through the heart of the mountain. The Ken-Ō Expressway opened to traffic on March 28, 2012. Because of its brilliant fall colors, Mount Takao has become a very popular kōyō (autumn foliage) spot. The mountain is home to many cherry blossoms, making it a popular spot during Hanami. However, due to climate change, the cherry trees are blooming earlier over time, by an average of 5.5 days over the 25-year study. Increased temperatures during earlier months, such as February and March, are responsible for much of the change in flowering times.

== Access ==
- Takao Station on the JR East Chūō Line
- Takaosan-guchi Station on the Keiō Takao Line

== Gallery ==
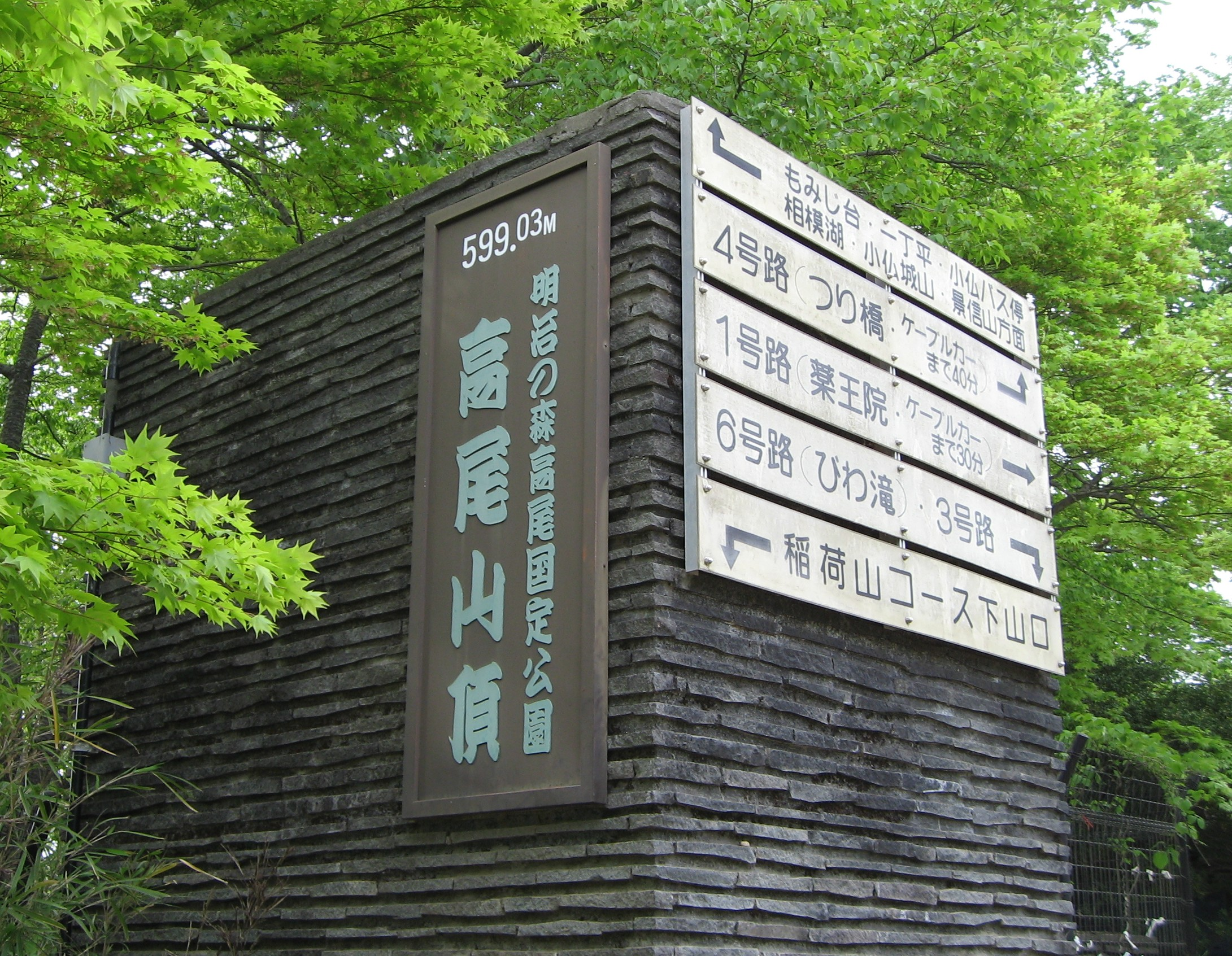
Sign on summit of Mount Takao

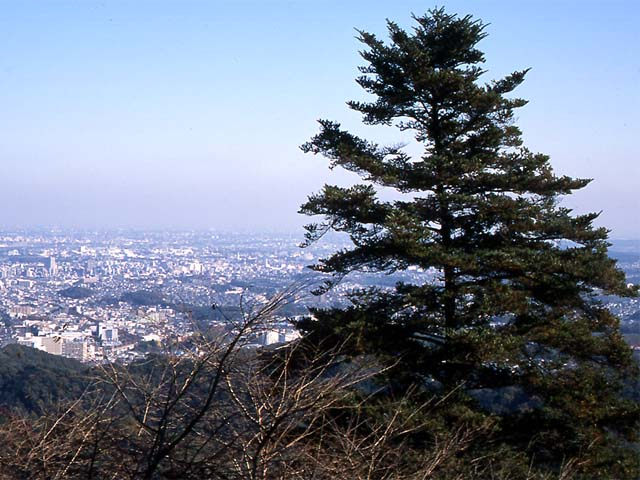
View of Tokyo from Mount Takao

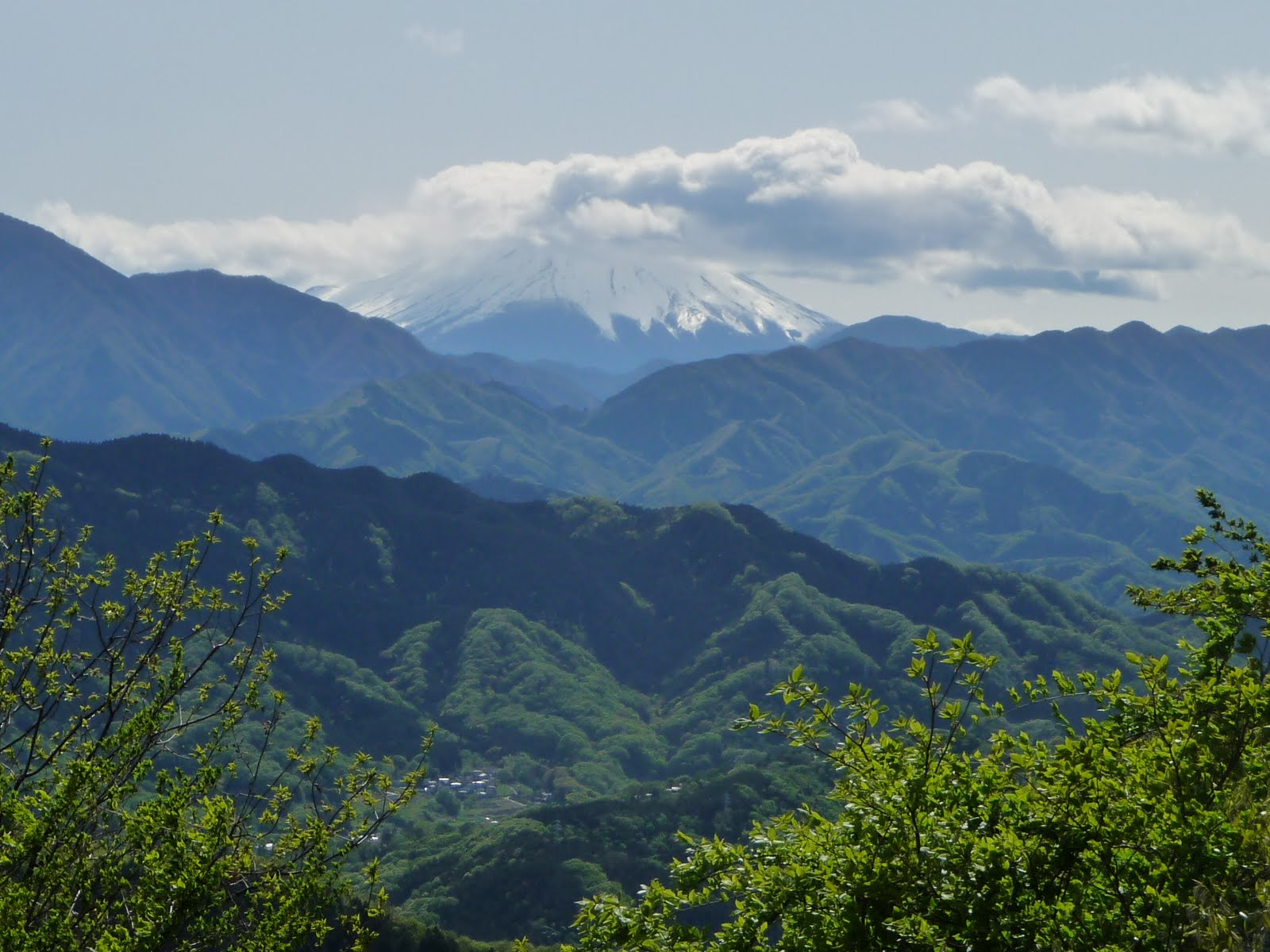
View of Mount Fuji from Mount Takao

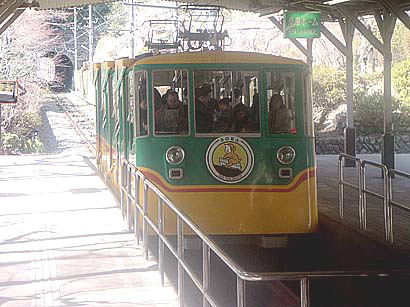
Funicular

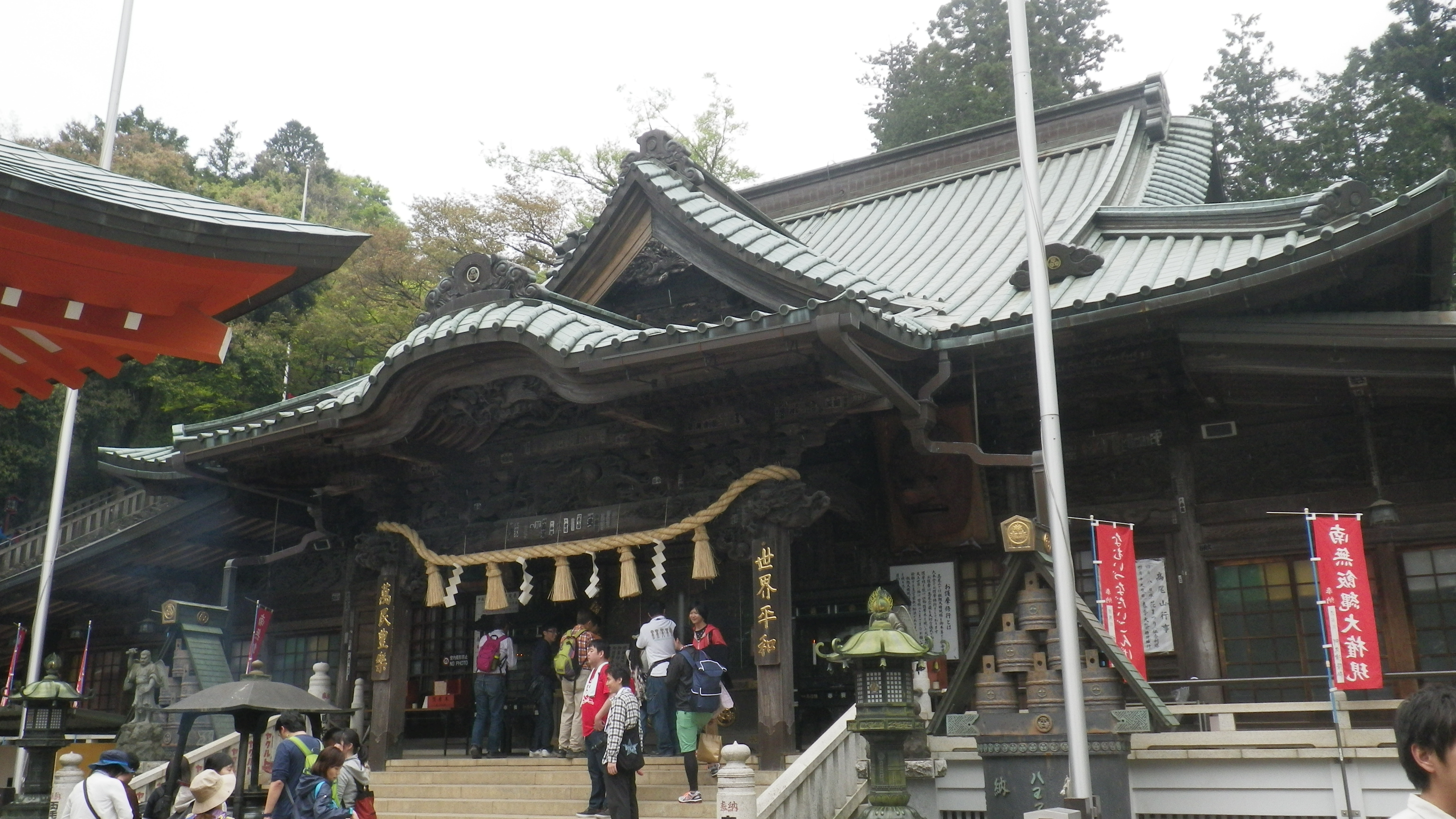
Head Temple Takao-san Yakuo-in

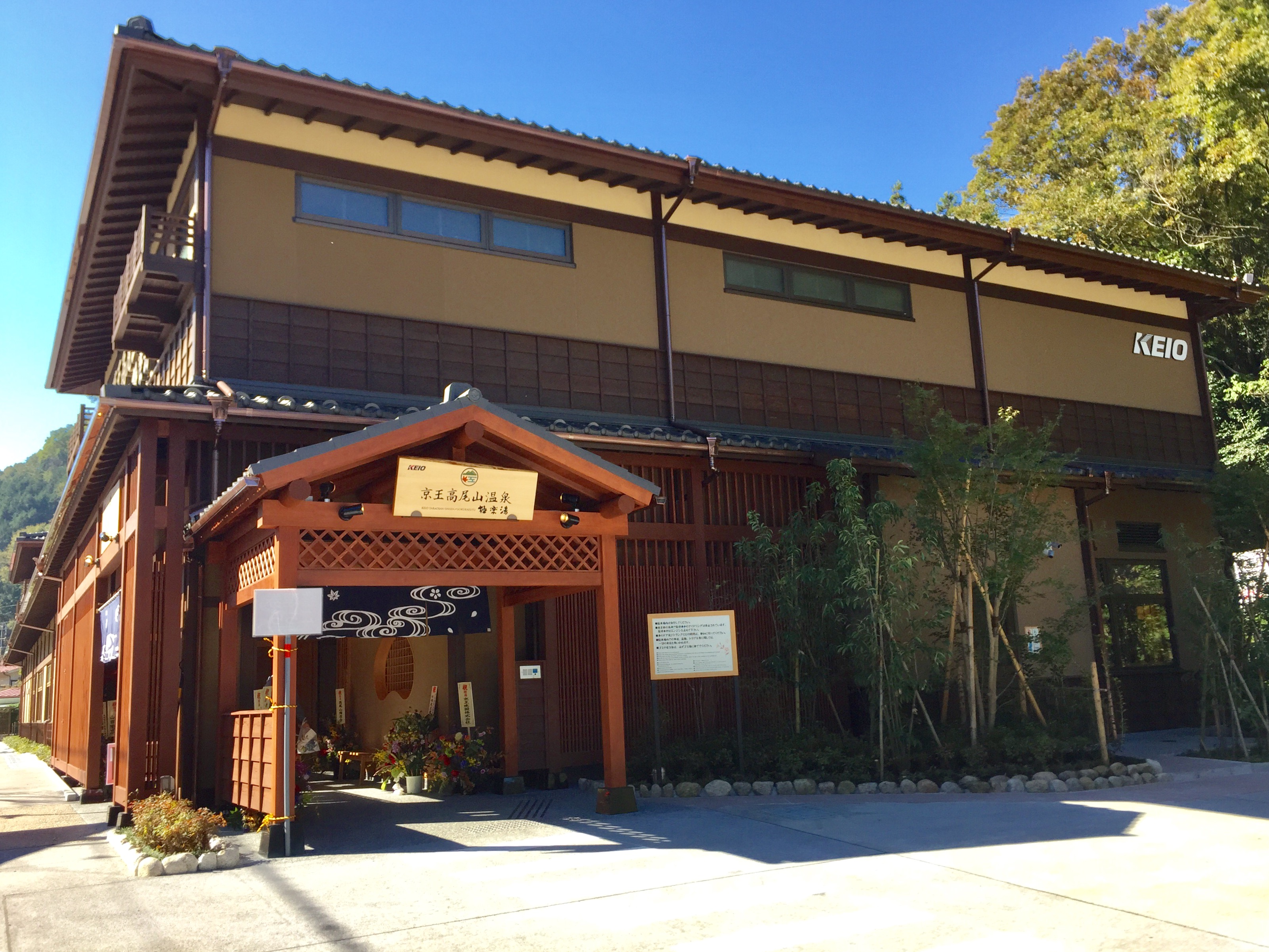
Keio Takaosan Onsen Gokurakuyu
