= Tsuru Pass =

Mountain pass in Kosuge, Japan

鶴峠
- English: Tsuru Pass
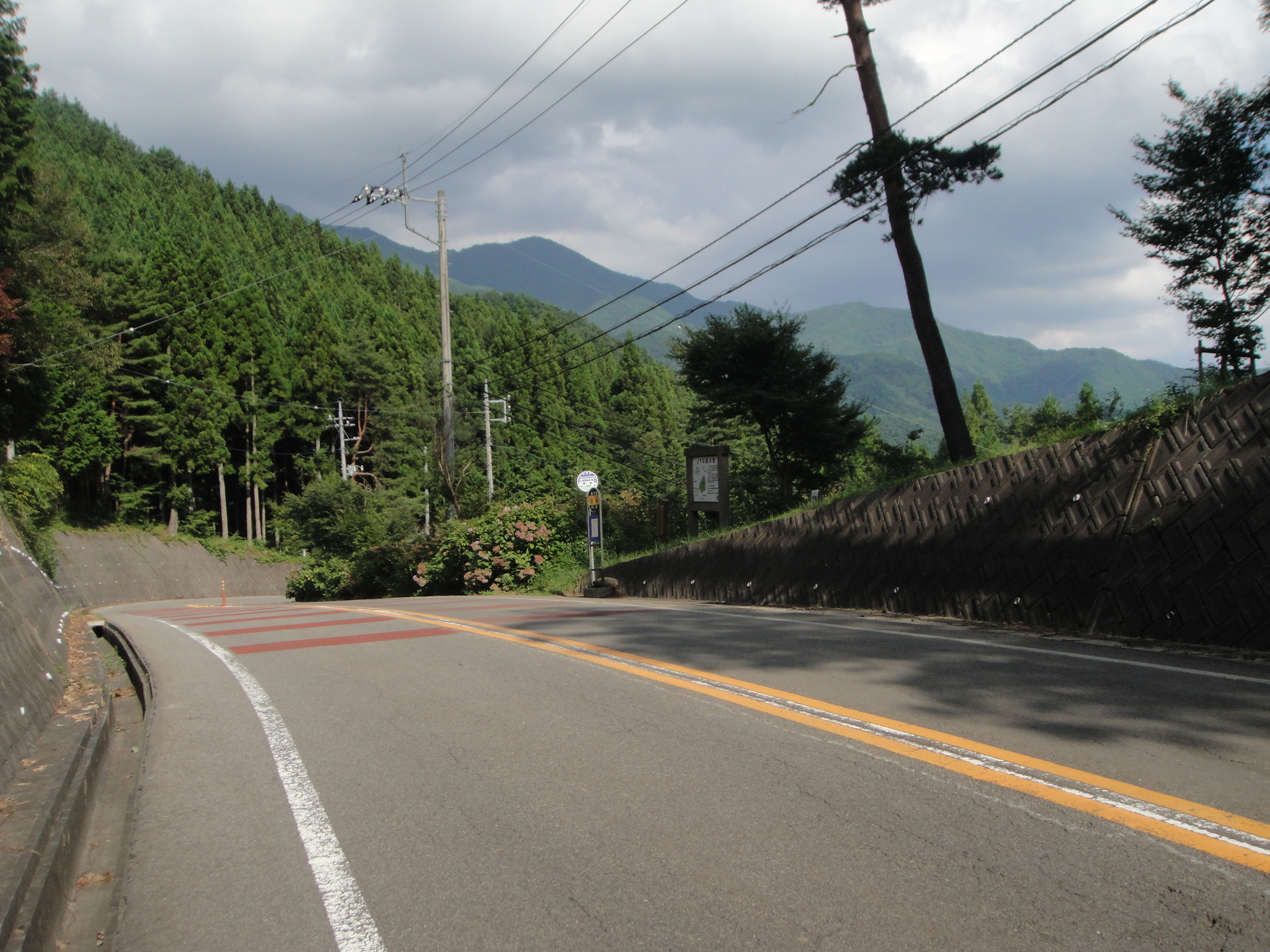
- 鶴峠 - Tsuru Pass（November 2011）

- Location within Yamanashi Prefecture Location within Japan
- Elevation: 870 metres (2,850 ft)Japan; Kosuge, Yamanashi, Kitatsuru District, Yamanashi Prefecture

Third Approach
- Range: Okuchichibu Mountains
- Coordinates: 35°43′52″N 138°58′35″E

Tsuru Pass (鶴峠, Tsuru-tōge) is a mountain pass in Kosuge, Yamanashi, Kitatsuru District, Yamanashi Prefecture, at an altitude of 870m. Yamanashi Prefectural Road 18 runs through the pass.

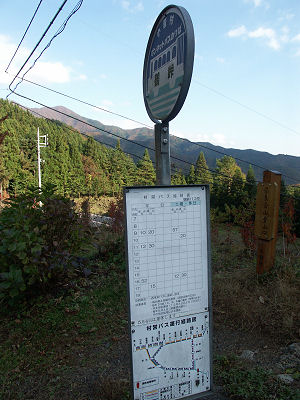
Tsuru Pass Bus stop（November 2005）

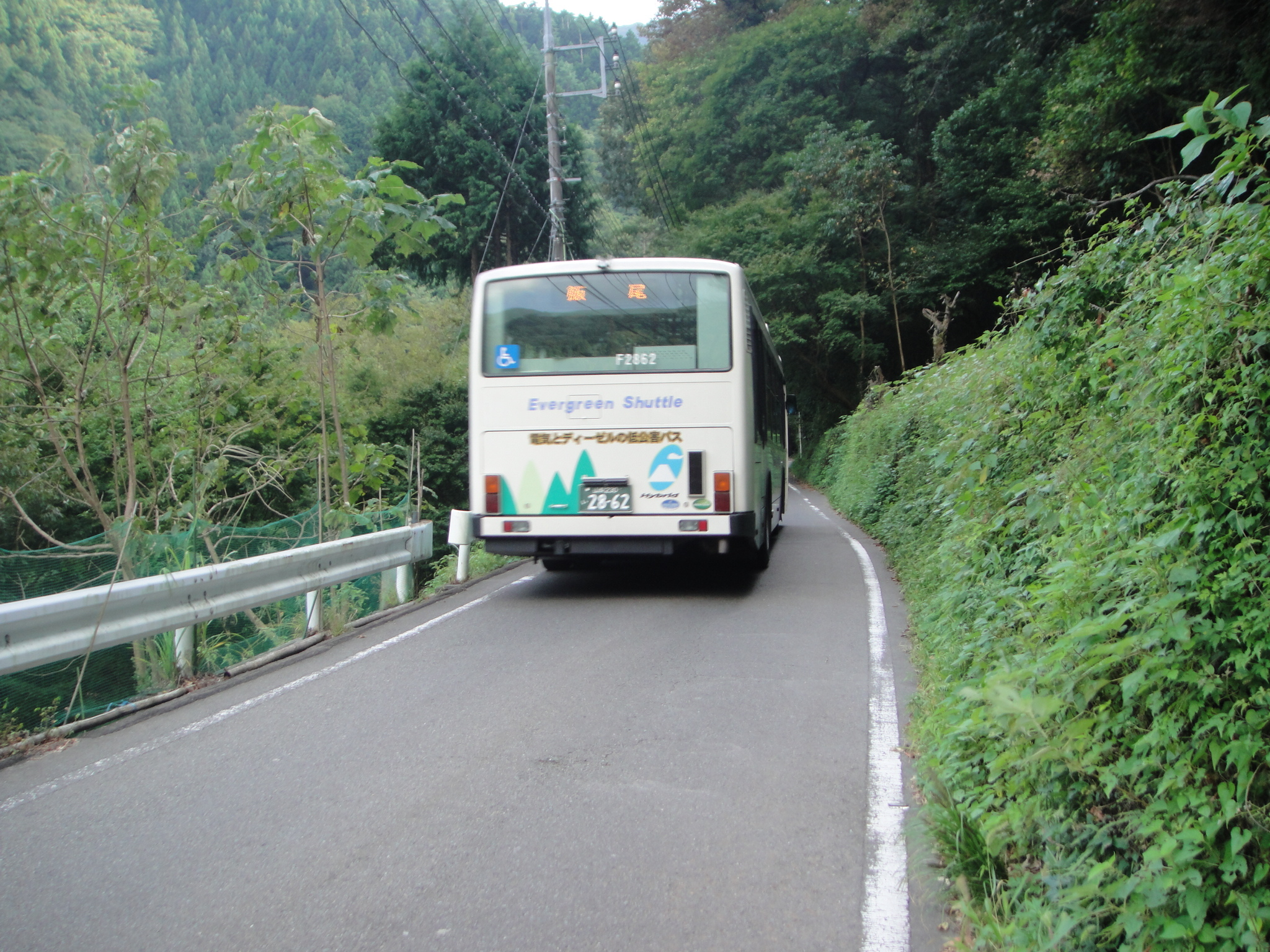
A bus bound for Īio operated by Kosuge, Yamanashi

== Outline ==
The Shirasawa River (part of the Tama River system), flows north of the mountain pass, and the Tsuru River (part of the Sagami River system) flows to the south. The pass is a watershed dividing Tokyo Bay and Sagami Bay and is also the source of Tokyo's water supply. Several trails start here, including those to Mount Mitō, Matsuhime Pass and Mount Narakura.

The old road, passes through the pass, connects Tabayama and Kosuge, Yamanashi with Uenohara, wasn't open to vehicular traffic. Yamanashi Prefectural Route 18 has been built by Yamanashi prefecture for the use of motorists. Nagasaku Kannon Hall, was built in the Heian period, is in the pass and is an Important Cultural Property (Japan).

== Transportation ==
No.	Via	Destination	Company	Note
Nagasaku Line	Nagasaku	Iio	Kosuge Village-Run Bus	Routes to Hashidate-ue (via Kosuge-no-Yu) and Iio on weekdays mornings. No service on Sundays.
Nagasaku Line	Kosuge-no-Yu	Hashidate-ue	Kosuge Village-Run Bus	Routes to Hashidate-ue (via Kosuge-no-Yu) and Iio on weekdays mornings. No service on Sundays.
