= Tsuru River =

River in Honshu, Japan

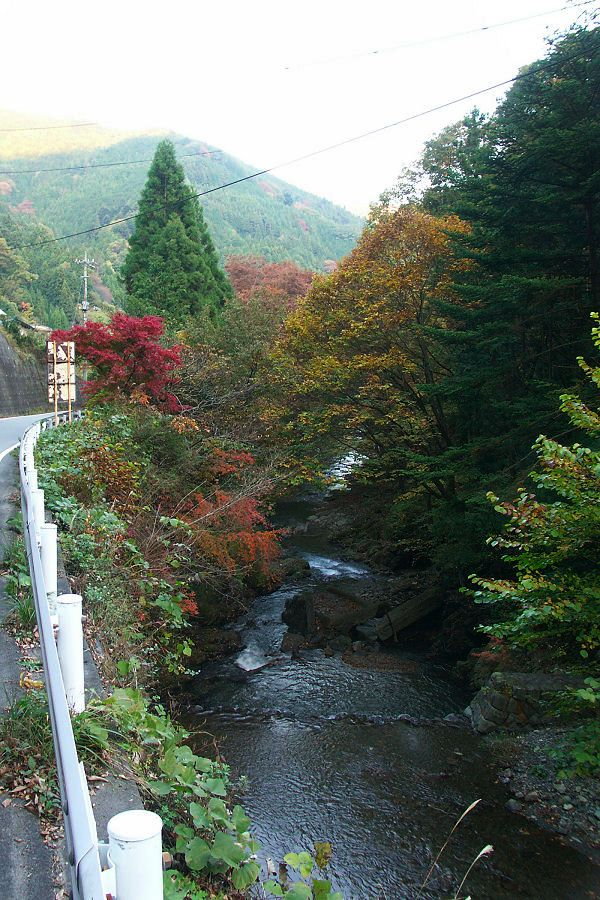
- at Saihara, Uenohara, Yamanashi prefecture

- Location within Japan
- Native name: 相模川 (Japanese)

Location
- Country: Japan

Physical characteristics
- Source
  - location: near the Tsuru mountain pass
  - elevation: 800 m (2,600 ft)
- Mouth
  - location: Sagami River
  - elevation: 150 m (490 ft)
- Length: 26.3 km (16.3 mi)
- Basin size: 107.2 km^{2} (41.4 sq mi)

Tsuru River or Tsuru-kawa River (鶴川 in Japanese) is a branch of the Sagami River of Honshu, Japan. It runs 26.3 kilometers in Yamanashi prefecture.

== Geography ==
Tsuru River originates in conifer wood of the Kosuge village where is located near Tsuru Pass but soon crosses the border with the Uenohara municipality area. It follows generally a southeastern and southern course to exit into the Sagami River at the Uenohara town.

Except for the area around the river mouth, or one of the river terraces of the Sagami, the Tsuru runs narrow valley between mountains. Nagasaku (長作), Saihara (西原), Yuzurihara (棡原) and another small villages scatter along it. An asphalt paved road, Yamanashi Prefectural Highway 33rd: Uenohara - Tabayama Line, links them to Uenohara town.

Biodiversity is well preserved due to mountain wood and the lack of dam development. Many species of upper stream fish in Japan live; White-spotted Char (Salvelinus leucomaenis), Seema (Oncorhynchus masou), Japanese Fluvial Sculpin (Cottus pollux), Ayu (Plecoglossus altivelis), Amur Minnow (Rhynchocypris lagowskii), Pale Chub (Zacco platypus) and others. Also Forest Green Tree Frog (Rhacophorus arboreus) and Japanese clawed salamander (Onychodactylus japonicus) inhabit this river.

Good water quality allow culture of wasabi.

== Administration ==
Truru River belongs to the Sagami river system, one of the first class river system under the Japanese River Law. The principal of the law says the control and the maintenance of the river to the national government. But in reality all part of the Tsuru is entrusted to the Yamanashi prefecture.
