= Joki =

Joki may refer to:

- The River (2001 film) (Joki), a 2001 Finnish film directed by Jarmo Lampela
- Aulis J. Joki (1913–1989), Finnish linguist and one of the students of Gustaf John Ramstedt
- Kaisen Joki (1500–1582), Japanese Buddhist priest
