= Matsuhime Pass =

Mountain pass in Yamanashi prefecture, Japan

- 松姫峠
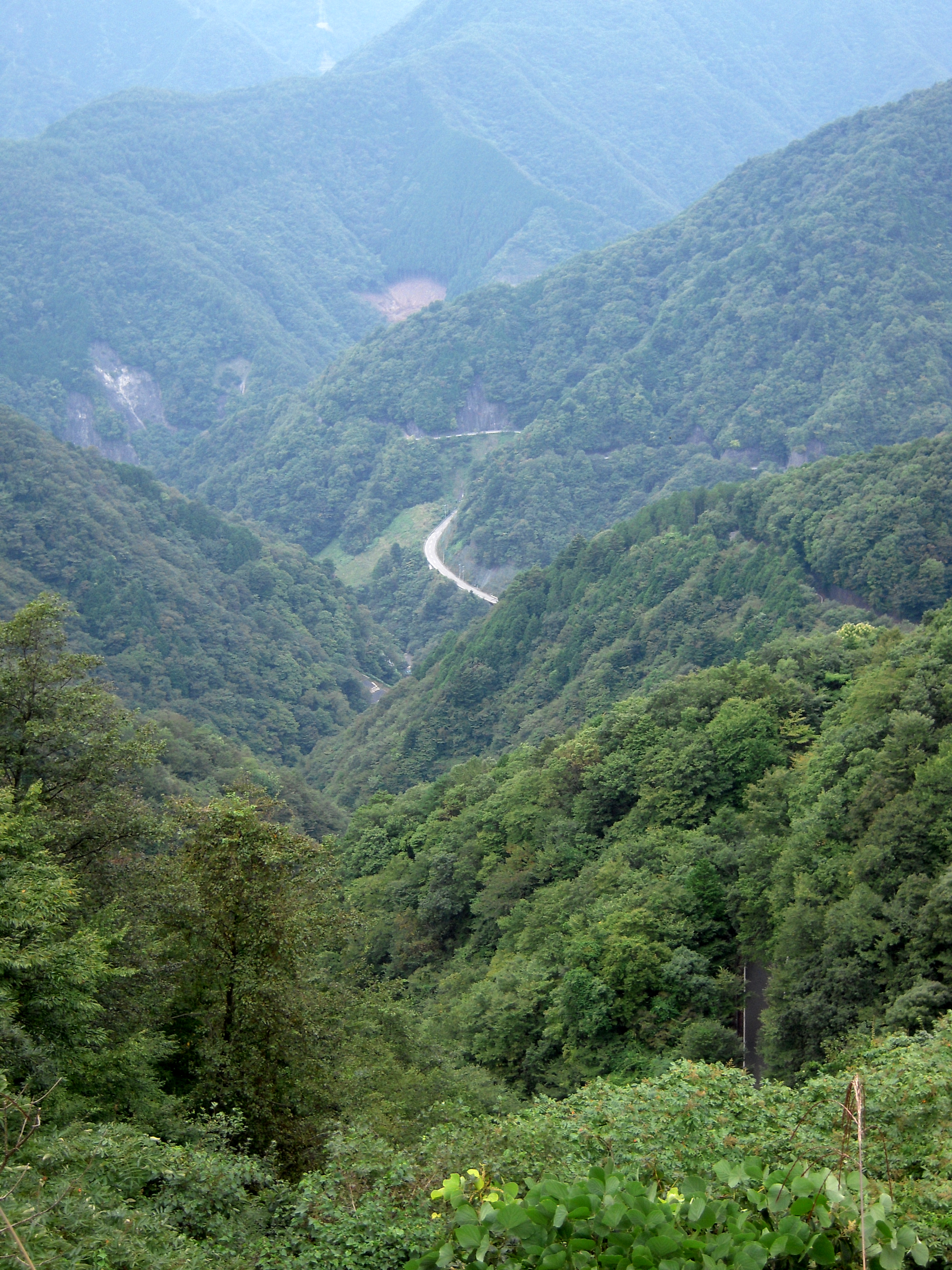
- Matsuhime Pass

- Location within Yamanashi Prefecture Location within Japan
- Elevation: 1,250 metres (4,100 ft)
- Traversed by: Japan National Route 139

Third Approach
- Location: Kosuge/Kitatsuru and Otsuki, Yamanashi, Japan
- Range: Okuchichibu Mountains
- Coordinates: 35°43′39″N 138°57′00″E

Matsuhime Pass (1,250 m) is a mountain pass in-between Otsuki and Kosuge, Yamanashi Prefecture, Japan.

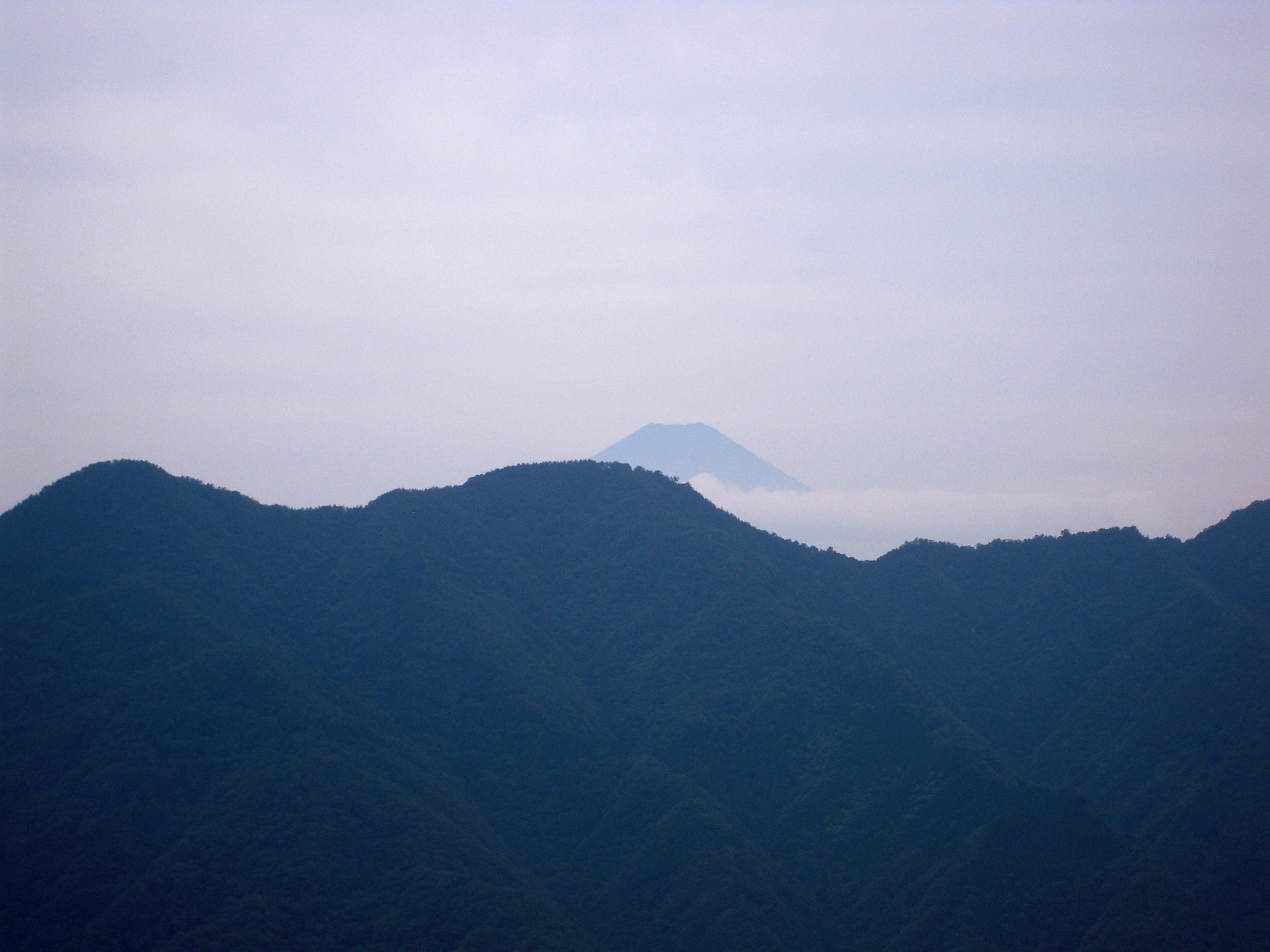
Mt.Fuji

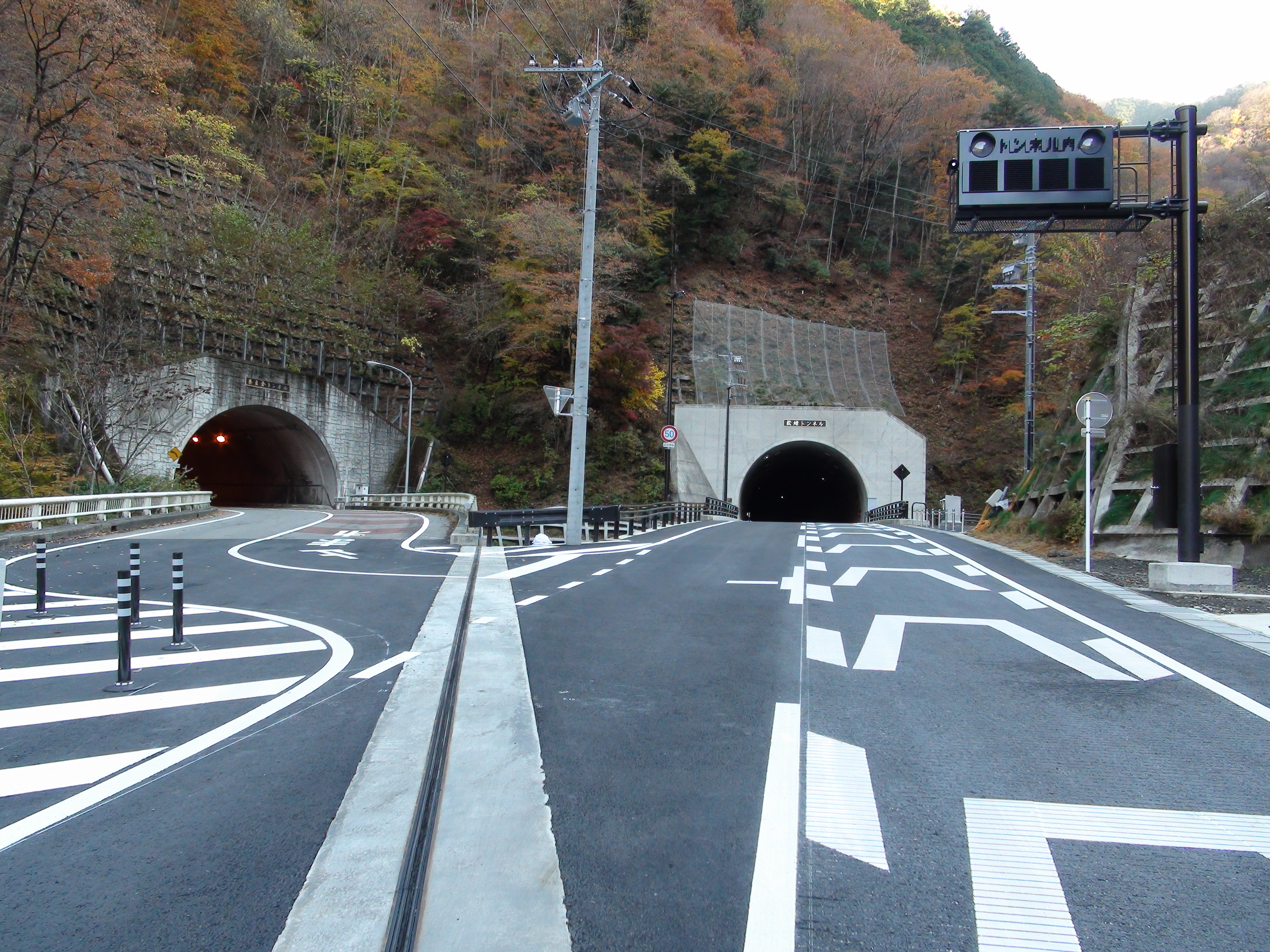
Matsuhime Tunnel took photo on 23 November 2014

== Outline ==
The mountain pass is named Matsuhime Tōge, because Matsuhime, who was a daughter of Shingen Takeda, passed through the mountain pass when she got away from an army of Nobunaga Oda in the Sengoku period.

At present, Japan National Route 139 which is an old road is passed through the mountain pass. The old road has been narrow (one lane going each way) and winding, because the area is a steep topo. But, got rid of rough road because Matsuhime Tunnel (3066m) which belongs to Matsuhime Bypass (3800m) opened in 2014.

Furthermore, as the Matsuhime Bypass (3800m) was open to traffic as a new road of Japan National Route 139 in 2014, the old road was closed due to reconstruction from March to September 2015. The old road had been accessible from October 2015, but has been closed due to danger of falling rocks and landslides since 2019. The safety of one section of the old road was confirmed in 2020. For the above reason, the mountain pass has been accessible by car only from Kosuge, Yamanashi since 2020.

== Surrounding area ==
- Fukashiro Dam
- Kazunogawa Dam

== Transportation ==
Access to the mountain pass, you ride a tax from Ōtsuki Station in 50 minutes or walk from Kosuge-no-Yu Bus Stop in 90 minutes.
