= Kōgaku-ji =

Buddhist temple in Kōshū, Japan

Kōgaku-ji 向嶽寺
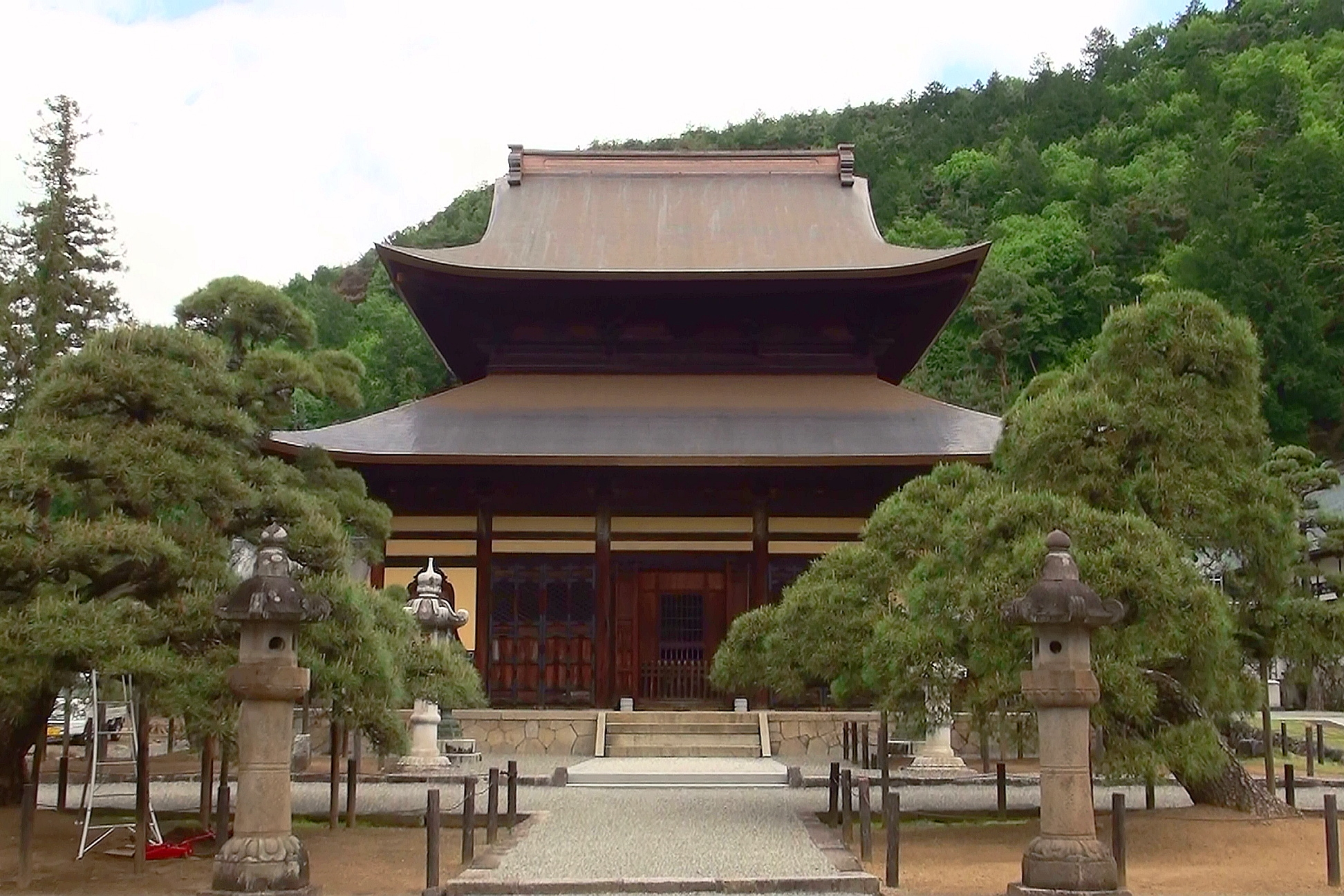
- Kōgaku-ji main hall

- Kōgaku-ji Kōgaku-ji (Japan)

Religion
- Affiliation: Buddhism
- Deity: Shaka Nyōrai
- Rite: Rinzai school of Zen

Location
- Location: 2026 Enzankamiozō, Kōshū-shi, Yamanashi-ken
- Country: Japan
- Interactive map of Kōgaku-ji 向嶽寺
- Coordinates: 35°42′40.2″N 138°43′21.4″E

Architecture
- Founder: Bassui Tokushō
- Completed: 1968 (reconstruction)

Website
- www.rinnou.net/cont_03/13kogaku/

Kōgaku-ji (向嶽寺), originally Kōgaku-an, is a Buddhist temple belonging to the Rinzai school of Japanese Zen. located in the city of Kōshū, Yamanashi, Japan. It is the head temple of one of fourteen autonomous branches of the Rinzai school. Its main image is a statue of Shaka Nyōrai. The temple, including its famed Japanese garden is not open to the general public.

== History ==
The temple founded as a hermitage in 1380 by Bassui Tokushō, a noted Zen prelate from Sagami Province, who had trained with Sōtō, Rinzai and Ch'an traditions. Due to the growing popularity of his teachings, he moved further and further into the countryside seeking the peace required for his meditations. His popularity continued after his death, and Emperor Go-Kameyama designated the temple as a chokugan-ji, or "temple to pray for the nation" during the civil wars of the Nanboku-chō period. The temple was heavily sponsored by the Takeda clan, who were the rulers of Kai Province and was awarded with estates and built numerous subsidiary temples and chapels. However, after the fall of the Takeda clan and the establishment of the Tokugawa shogunate in the Edo period, the temple gradually fell from prosperity and many of its subsidiary temples were abolished or joined other branches of the Rinzai school. In 1782 much of the original temple complex was destroyed in a fire. After the start of the Meiji period, it became part of the Nanzen-ji branch of Rinzai. It recovered its status as the head temple of its own branch of Rinzai in 1908. Kōgaku-ji today governs eight sub-temples and fifty temple affiliates.

== Cultural properties ==
=== National Treasures ===
==== Kōgaku-ji painting of Daruma ====
The Painting of Daruma (絹本著色達磨図, kenpon chakushoku darumazu) at Kōgaku-ji is hanging scroll in colored ink on paper, depicting Daruma with red robes, seated in a formal pose. The painting dates from approximately the 1260s, and has an inscription by Lanxi Daolong, the famed priest and head abbot of Kenchō-ji in Kamakura. The scroll measures 123.3 cm × 61.2 cm (48.5 in × 24.1 in). The painting was made by an unknown Japanese painter who was strongly influenced by the Southern Song style. It was designated a National Treasure of Japan on November 14, 1953

=== Important cultural properties ===
==== Kōgaku-ji Central Gate ====
The Kōgaku-ji Central Gate (向嶽寺中門, Kōgaku-ji chumon) is a wooden gate with four pillars and a cypress-shingle roof, dating from the Muromachi period and is one of the oldest remaining structures of the temple. It was designated an Important Cultural Property of Japan on June 22, 1971

==== Portrait painting of Sankō Kokushi ====
The Portrait painting of Sankō Kokushi (絹本著色三光国師像, kenpon chakushoku Sankō Kokushi-zō) a Muromachi period hanging scroll in colored ink on paper, depicting Kōhō Kakumyō (孤峰覚明; 1271-1361), a Zen prelate from Aizu who travelled to Yuan period China to study Zen at the Tianmu Mountain. He became the chief priest of Kōgaku-ji after his return to Japan. The portrait depicts the priest seated in a chair and measures 136.4 cm by 60.6 cm. It was designated an Important Cultural Property of Japan on May 25, 1916

==== Portrait painting of Sankō Kokushi ====
The Portrait painting of Daien Zenji (絹本著色大円禅師像, kenpon chakushoku Daien Zenji-zō) a Muromachi period hanging scroll in colored ink on paper, depicting Bassui Tokushō. The portrait depicts the priest seated in a chair and measures 128.8 cm by 62.2 cm. The portrait was painted in 1393 on the seventh memorial of the priest's death. It was designated an Important Cultural Property of Japan on May 25, 1916

==== Kōgaku-ji wooden printing blocks ====
Kōgaku-ji has many printing blocks, some of which date from the Muromachi period and Edo period. Of these, a set of 37 blocks (塩山和泥合水集板木) dated 1386 and one block dated 1389 (抜隊得勝遺誡板) were designated Important Cultural Properties on June 10, 2007 The former is a question-and-answer form showing responses to questions which are asked by priests. The latter is a set of regulations for prices issued by Bassui Tokushō.

=== National Place of Scenic Beauty ===
==== Kōgaku-ji gardens ====
The Japanese garden on the slope of the mountain on the north side of the precinct is a stone garden believed to date from the early Edo period, and renovated several times in the 18th and 19th centuries. It was excavated in 1990 by archaeologists, and was found to contain an arrangement of rock formations and ponds and waterfalls. It was designated as a National Places of Scenic Beauty of Japan on June 6, 1994.

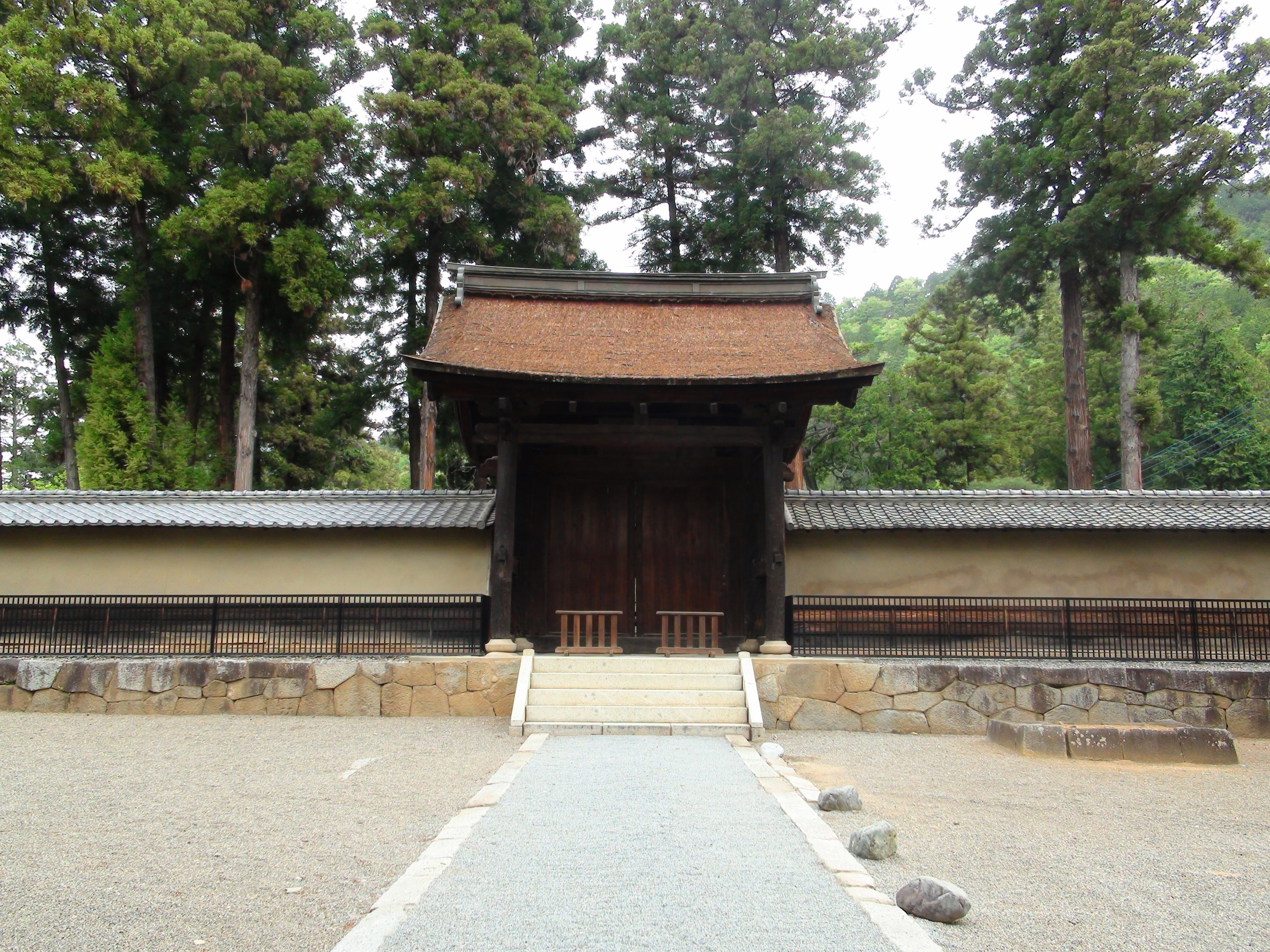
Kōgaku-ji Middle Gate (ICP)

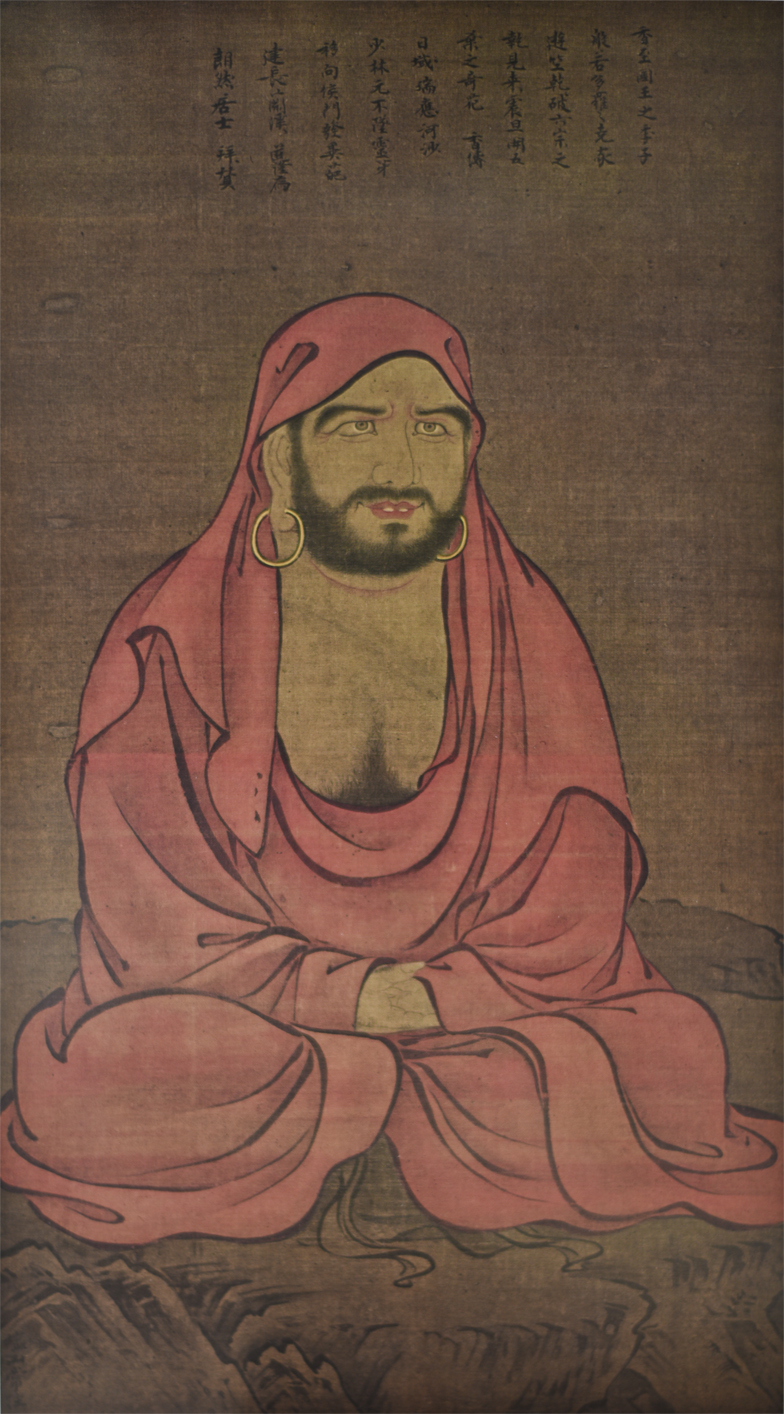
Painting of Daruma (NT)

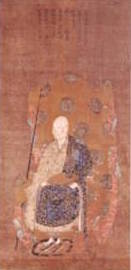
Portrait of Daien Zenji (ICP)

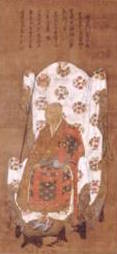
Portrait of Sankō Kokushi (ICP)

== See also ==
- List of National Treasures of Japan (paintings)
- List of Places of Scenic Beauty of Japan (Yamanashi)
