= Matsuhime =

Japanese noblewoman of the Takeda clan

- 松姫

Personal life
- Born: 1562 Kai Province, Japan
- Died: 31 May 1616 (aged 53–54)
- Parent(s): Takeda Shingen; Aburakawa-fuujin
- Occupation: Bhikkhunī

Religious life
- Religion: Buddhism
- Dharma name: Shinsho-ni (信松尼)
- Military career
- Unit: Takeda clan

Matsuhime (松姫, 1562 - 31 May 1616) or Shinsho-ni (信松尼) was a Japanese noblewoman who was a member of the Takeda clan, an important samurai family of the Sengoku period. She was the daughter of Takeda Shingen and wife of Oda Nobutada. She is best known for trying to strengthen an ailing alliance between Takeda and Oda, two rival families. Matsu is also known for her rightful love and undying devotion to Oda Nobutada, which is considered unusual for the time period. A mountain pass is named Matsuhime Tōge in her honor due to her having used the path to escape Oda Nobunaga's army. The Shinsho-in temple in Hachioji (Tokyo) preserves to this day a wooden statue of Matsuhime and the naginata (polearm) she wielded.

== Early life ==
Matsuhime was born in Kai province as Shingen's fifth daughter. Her mother was Shingen's concubine Aburakawa-fuujin. She was a younger sister of Nishina Morinobu. According to Kai Kokushi, Shingen devoted himself to prayer for the healthy recovery of one of his ill daughters in 1565; the common consensus is that the girl in question is Matsuhime.

According to the tales, Matsuhime's mother Aburakawafujin was famous as the most beautiful woman in Koshu, and Matsuhime herself was also famous for her beauty along with her sister, Kikuhime who was the wife of Uesugi Kagekatsu. According to the theory that Matsuhime's other older sister Shinryuin's mother was also Aburakawafujin, Matsuhime's sisters were Marihime and Kikuhime.

=== Engagement with Nobunaga's heir ===
The Kōyō Gunkan states that the Oda-Takeda alliance was threatened in 1567 when Takeda Katsuyori's wife (Ryūshō-in) and Oda Nobunaga's niece and adopted daughter, died. In an effort to keep the alliance intact, an engagement was arranged for the eleven-year old Oda Nobutada, an heir of the famous Oda Nobunaga, to wed the seven-year old Matsuhime. However, as they were both still very young, Nobunaga decides to wait for the two to grow up and have a wedding ceremony. Oda Nobunaga says that he instructed his son, Nobutada, to give Matsuhime gifts and letters diligently. For this reason, correspondence began between Nobutada and Matsuhime, and although it was a form of political marriage, she and Nobutada had not actually seen each other in person, but spent time exchanging mail, and eventually had a spiritual connection. She stayed with the Takeda family and was formally treated as 'the entrusted lawful wife of Nobutada,' and was called Niitachi-Goryōnin.

=== Fall of the alliance ===
In 1572, when Takeda Shingen started to conquer westward, the Battle of Mikatagahara broke out against Tokugawa Ieyasu. The Takeda clan emerged victorious from the battle, Ieyasu's troops were almost completely annihilated. Among Ieyasu's soldiers were 3,000 soldiers from the Oda clan. Because Nobunaga sent reinforcement to Tokugawa, the relation between the Takeda and Oda families broke, they cut off all ties to the Takeda. At that time, Matsuhime was 12 years old and it was almost time to get married. The engagement between Matsuhime and Nobutada Oda has been called off. It was said that the feeling between the two was legitimate.

=== Shingen's death ===
The daimyo of Kai Province died in 1573, a year after breaking allegiance to Oda Nobunaga's powerful Oda clan. When Takeda Shingen was 49 years old, he was the only daimyō with the power and tactical skill to stop Oda Nobunaga's race to rule Japan. With the death of Shingen, Takeda Katsuyori, Matsuhime's half-brother became the clan's leader.

After the cancellation of her engagement to Oda Nobutada and the death of Shingen, Matsuhime moved to Takato Castle under the patronage of her brother Nishina Morinobu. She lived with her brother for several years, and in 1580 her brother finally became the governor of Takato Castle.

== The fall of the Takeda clan ==
In 1575, Takeda Katsuyori suffered a major defeat at the Battle of Nagashino, causing the Takeda clan's power to wane even further. Matsuhime was under his biological brother's protection in Takato until 1582, when Oda Nobunaga turned his attention to Matsuhime's home.

=== Siege of Takatō Castle (1582) ===
In April 3, 1582, the Oda army, led by Oda Nobutada who departed for the front from Gifu Castle, besieged Takato Castle. Nobutada recommended the garrison surrender, but Nishina Morinobu refused. In the meantime, Oda Nobutada accompanied by his bodyguards tore down the palisade at the postern and forced an entry into the castle. A fierce battle ensued within the bailey and the castle buildings, and the defenders fought to the last, including women and children.

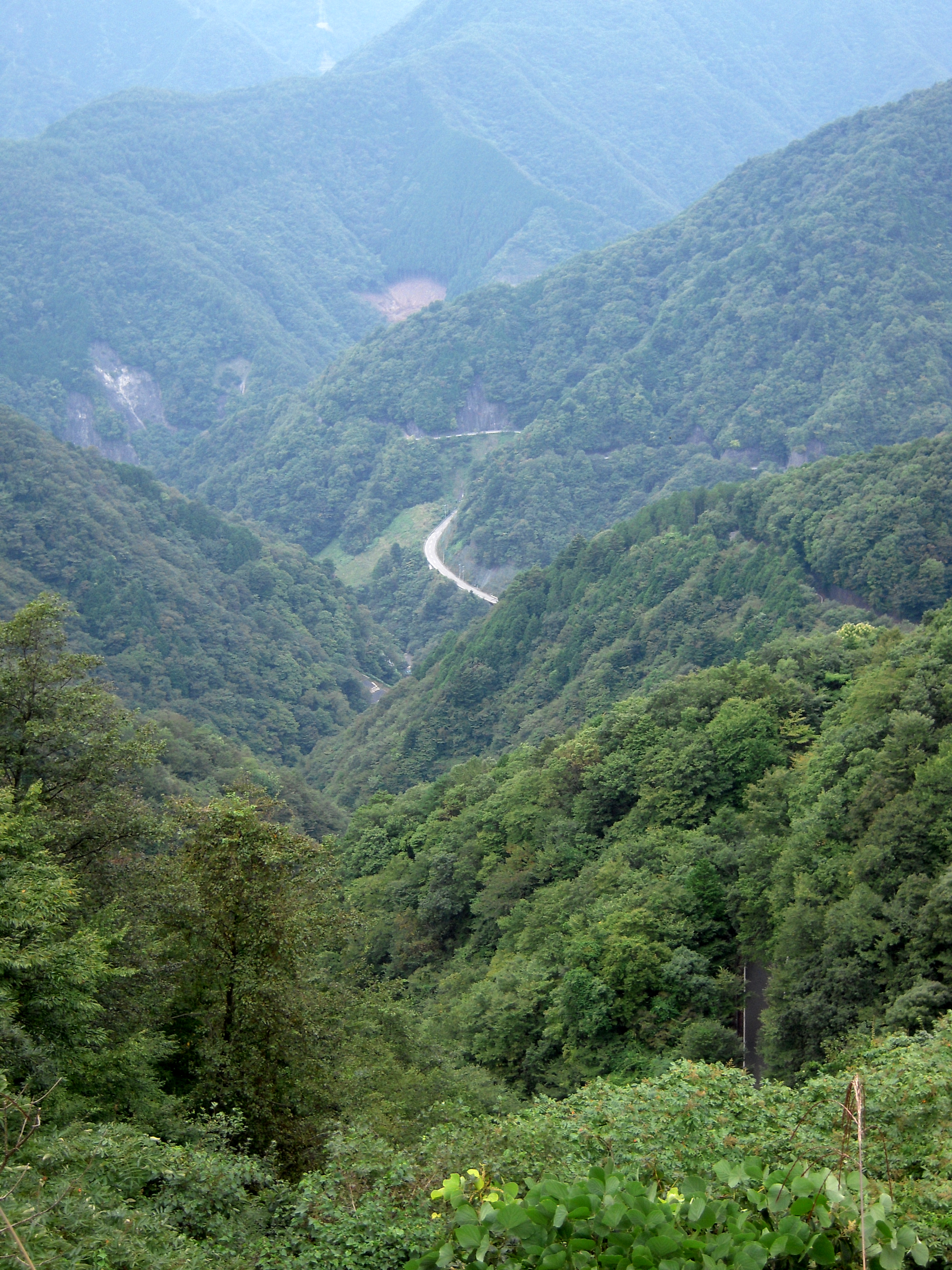
Matsuhime Toge, a mountain pass that Matsuhime used to escape.

After a fierce battle, Morinobu finally committed suicide. Before he conducted seppuku prior to the fall of the castle, he told Oda soldiers of his prediction of Nobunaga's death, which soon came to pass.

To avoid subjugation of Takeda by the Oda army led by her former fiance, the supreme commander Oda Nobutada, Matsuhime escaped the massacre with Morinobu's daughter and three other princesses. Matsuhime escaped Nobunaga's overwhelming army on a mountain pass. This path was named Matsuhime Toge in her honor for her heroic act of leading an escape to protect the Takeda bloodline.

They fled to many cities before settling at Kinshō-an, a temple in modern day Kamiongatamachi, where many old retainers of the Takeda clan lived.

=== Takeda and Oda downfall (1582) ===
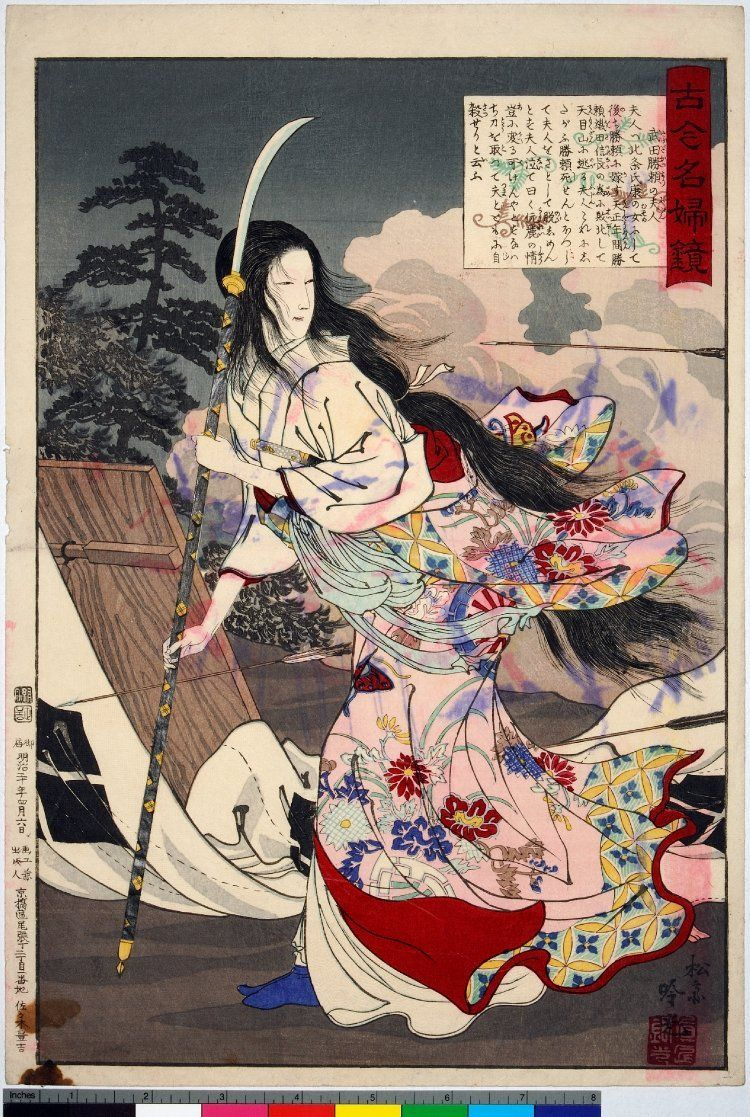
Takeda Katsuyori's wife at the Battle of Tenmokuzan

Days after the fall of Takato Castle, Nobutada continued his campaign against Matsuhime's family, chasing after Takeda Katsuyori who set Shinpu Castle on fire. During the Battle of Tenmoku-zan on April 13, Katsuyori, his wife Hojo Masako and their son Takeda Nobukatsu and others, cornered by Takigawa Kazumasu (Nobutada's Deputy Vice General), committed suicide on Tenmoku-zan Mountain, causing total downfall of the Takeda clan.

After subjugation of Takeda, an envoy of Nobutada visited Matsuhime who escaped to Hachioji to bring her back. On July 1, when Matsuhime was on a trip to see Nobutada, the Honnoji Incident broke out. Due to the Oda clan being the most powerful clan at the time, there was growing discontent with Oda Nobunaga's cruel attitudes, so Akechi Mitsuhide, one of Nobunaga's most trusted generals, decided to betray him and attack him while he was off guard.

Chaos broke out in Kyoto on the night of July 21, 1582. Nobutada attacked Mitsuhide at Nijo Palace and defeated Akechi's army three times. However, he was hopelessly outnumbered and committed suicide. Oda Nobunaga and several members of his family also committed suicide in the flames of the Nijo Palace.

Oda Hidenobu, Nobutada's son survived the incident, according to some historical materials, the real mother of Hidenobu was actually Matsuhime, but even the possibility that Princess Matsu and Nobutada knew each other while they were alive is low, and is considered to be some error.

Matsuhime came back alive from her trip to Kyoto. In autumn of 1582, Matsuhime moved and renounced the world by praying at Shingen-in Temple when she was 22, and became a nun. She called herself Shinsho-ni and they say that she prayed for the soul of Nobutada as well as the Takeda family.

== Later life ==
In 1590, she moved to a hut in Goshomizu, Hachioji. While living as a nun, it is said that she taught reading and writing to local children in a temple elementary school, did sericulture, and weaved cloth to earn money to raise her three princesses.

Okubo Nagayasu, who used to be a vassals of Takeda family and then daikangashira (the head of feudal government) of the Edo bakufu (Japanese feudal government headed by a shogun), is said to have helped Matsuhime including building a thatched hut for her. In addition, it is said that she served as spiritual support of Hachioji Sennin Doshin (junior officials in Hachioji) composed of many of the old retainers of the Takeda clan. It is said former Takeda retainers paid homage to her during the Tokugawa shogunate and that she was the caring heart of the community. Countless people were touched by her kindness and humility.

Matsuhime survived throughout the later Warring States period, dying at age 59 in 1616, a year after the Siege of Osaka, a battle that would end the war period for the next 200 years. She was buried in Shinshō-in, a temple built in her honor.

== Relationship with Oda Nobutada ==
Though she and Nobutada never wed, the fact that she took no other marriage prospects during her lifetime and started a pious life at a shockingly young age leads many to assume that her love for him remained strong for the rest of her life. Many tales insist that the sheer pain of losing her true love enabled her to sincerely empathize with others. There are legends which persist that Nobutada and Matsuhime kept a secret affair with one another in spite of their political differences, but there is so far no proof that these tales could be reality. Takeshi Nishiyama, a distant descendant of Nobunaga, claimed that the couple eloped and gave birth to Oda Nobuhide. Whether this claim is true or not has so far not been verified.
