= Erin-ji =

Buddhist temple

Erin-ji 恵林寺
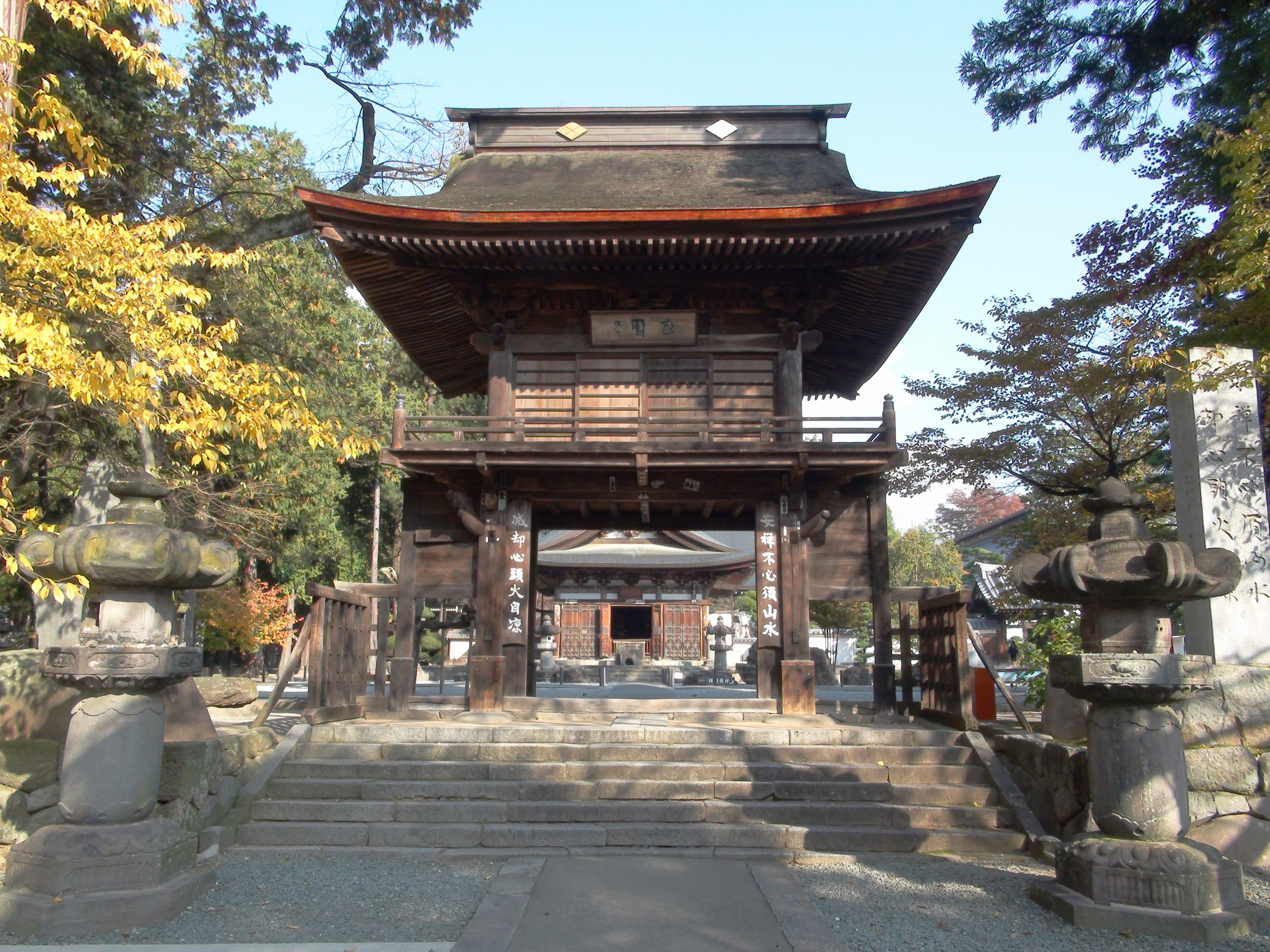
- Erin-ji Sanmon

- Erin-ji Erin-ji (Japan)

Religion
- Affiliation: Buddhism
- Deity: Shaka Nyōrai
- Rite: Rinzai school of Zen

Location
- Location: 2208 Enzankoyashiki, Kōshū-shi, Yamanashi-ken
- Country: Japan
- Interactive map of Erin-ji 恵林寺
- Coordinates: 35°43′47.9″N 138°42′49.8″E

Architecture
- Founder: Musō Soseki
- Completed: 1913 (reconstruction)

Website
- www.erinji.jp

Erin-ji (恵林寺), is a Buddhist temple belonging to the Myōshin-ji branch of the Rinzai school of Japanese Zen. Located in the city of Kōshū, Yamanashi, Japan. It is the clan temple of the Takeda clan, noted Sengoku period warlords and rulers of Kai Province from the Muromachi period. Its main image is a statue of Shaka Nyōrai.

== History ==
The temple founded in 1380 by Nikaidō Sadafuji, the shugo of Kai Province, who invited the noted Zen prelate Musō Soseki from Kanagawa to build a hermitage on his property. Due to the fame of Musō Soseki, it became the center for the dissemination of Rinzai teachings in Kao Province, and was named one of the Kantō Jissetsu by Shogun Ashikaga Yoshimitsu. However, the temple fell into ruin during the Onin War. It was revived in the Sengoku period by Takeda Harunobu in 1541. Takeda Shingen made Kaisen Joki head priest in 1564. In 1582, Kai Province was invaded by an alliance between Oda Nobunaga and Tokugawa Ieyasu. Eirin-ji was accused of sheltering Rokkaku Yoshisuke (a former enemy of the Oda), and the temple was completely destroyed.

After Tokugawa Ieyasu became master of Kai Province, he ordered that the temple be rebuilt and in 1672, memorial services for Takeda Shingen were held. The temple continued to honor its connection with the Takeda clan through the Edo period and even after the Meiji restoration. Most of the Edo period structures were lost in a fire of 1905.

== Cultural properties ==
=== Important cultural properties ===
==== Erin-ji Gate ====
The Erin-ji Gate (恵林寺四脚門, Erin-ji shikyakumon) is a wooden gate with four pillars and a cypress-shingle roof, built in 1606. It is the oldest remaining structures of the temple. It was designated an Important Cultural Property of Japan on August 28, 1907

==== Tachi Japanese sword ====
The Tachi (太刀 銘来国長, Tachi meirai Kunanaga) an Edo period Japanese sword (tachi), with a length of 79.5 cm. It was made in 1705 and donated to the temple by Yanagisawa Yoshiyasu on the occasion of the 133rd memorial services for Takeda Shigen. It was designated an Important Cultural Property of Japan on March 26, 1915.

==== Tantō Japanese sword ====
The Tantō (短刀 銘備州長船倫光, Tantō mei Bisshu Osafune Tomomitsu) a Nanboku-chō period Japanese sword (Tantō), with a length of 27.4 cm. It was made in 1367 and donated to the temple by Yanagisawa Yoshiyasu on the occasion of the 133rd memorial services for Takeda Shigen. It was designated an Important Cultural Property of Japan on March 26, 1915.

=== National Place of Scenic Beauty ===
==== Erin-ji gardens ====
The Japanese garden at Erin-ji located behind the main hall of the temple was designed by Musō Soseki when he was 56 years old, and can be considered a prototype for similar gardens he designed for Saihō-ji and Tenryū-ji in Kyoto. The garden covers approximately 2270 square meters, and contains a number of large stones, a pond with a small stream and a small waterfall, with the mountain in back forming part of a "borrowed landscape". It was designated as a National Places of Scenic Beauty of Japan on June 6, 1994.

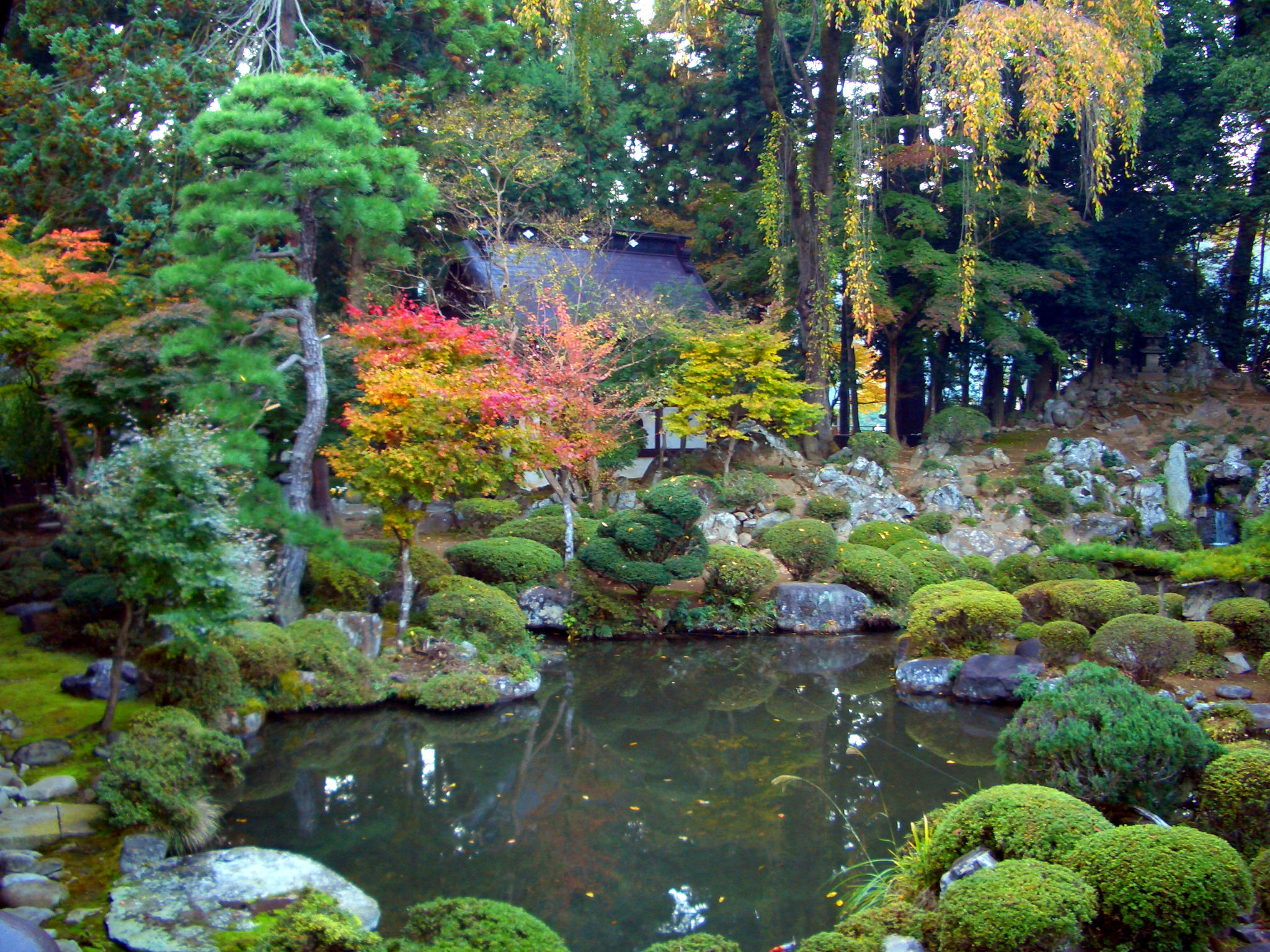
Erin-ji Gardens

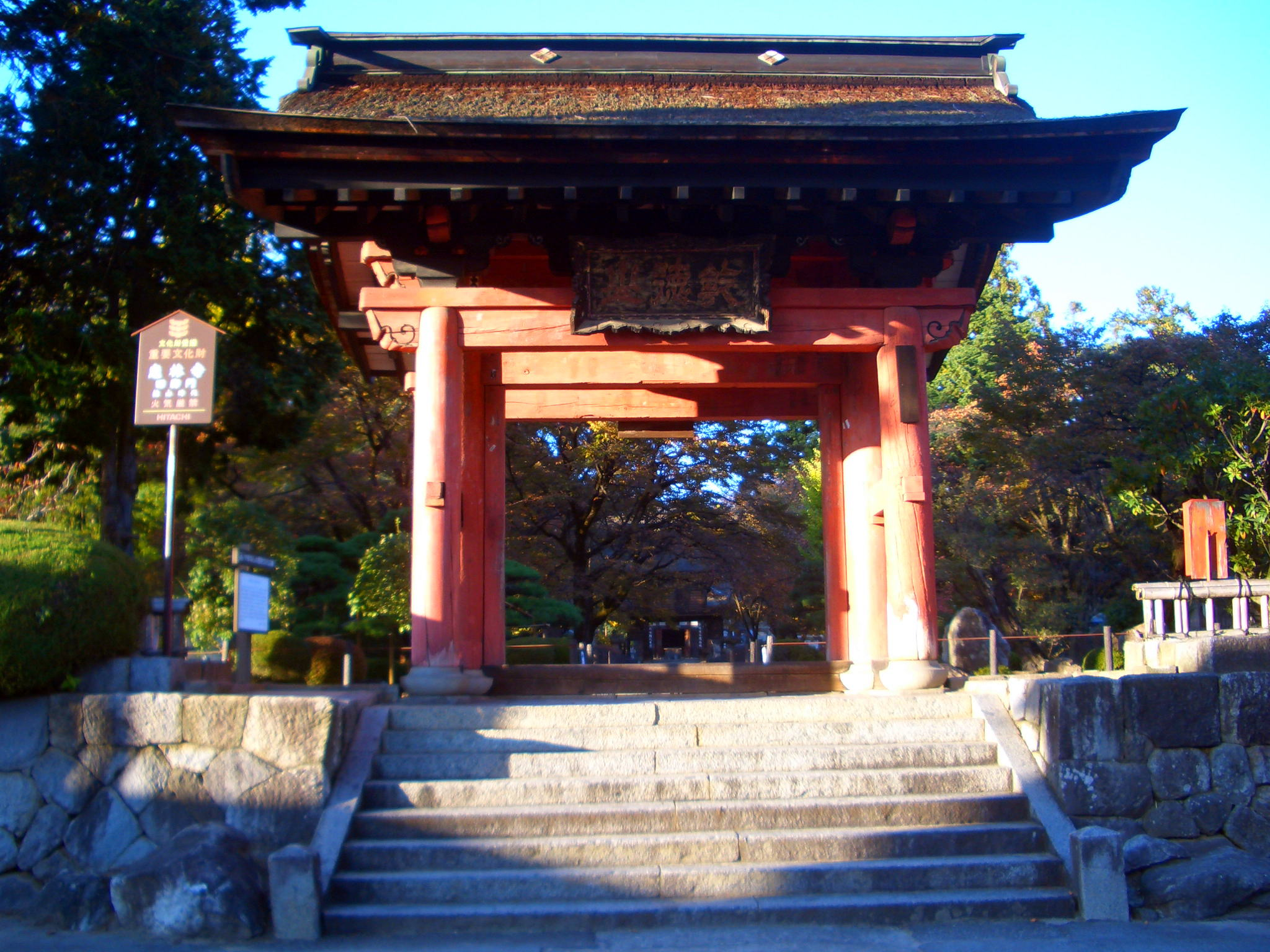
Erin-ji Gate (ICP)

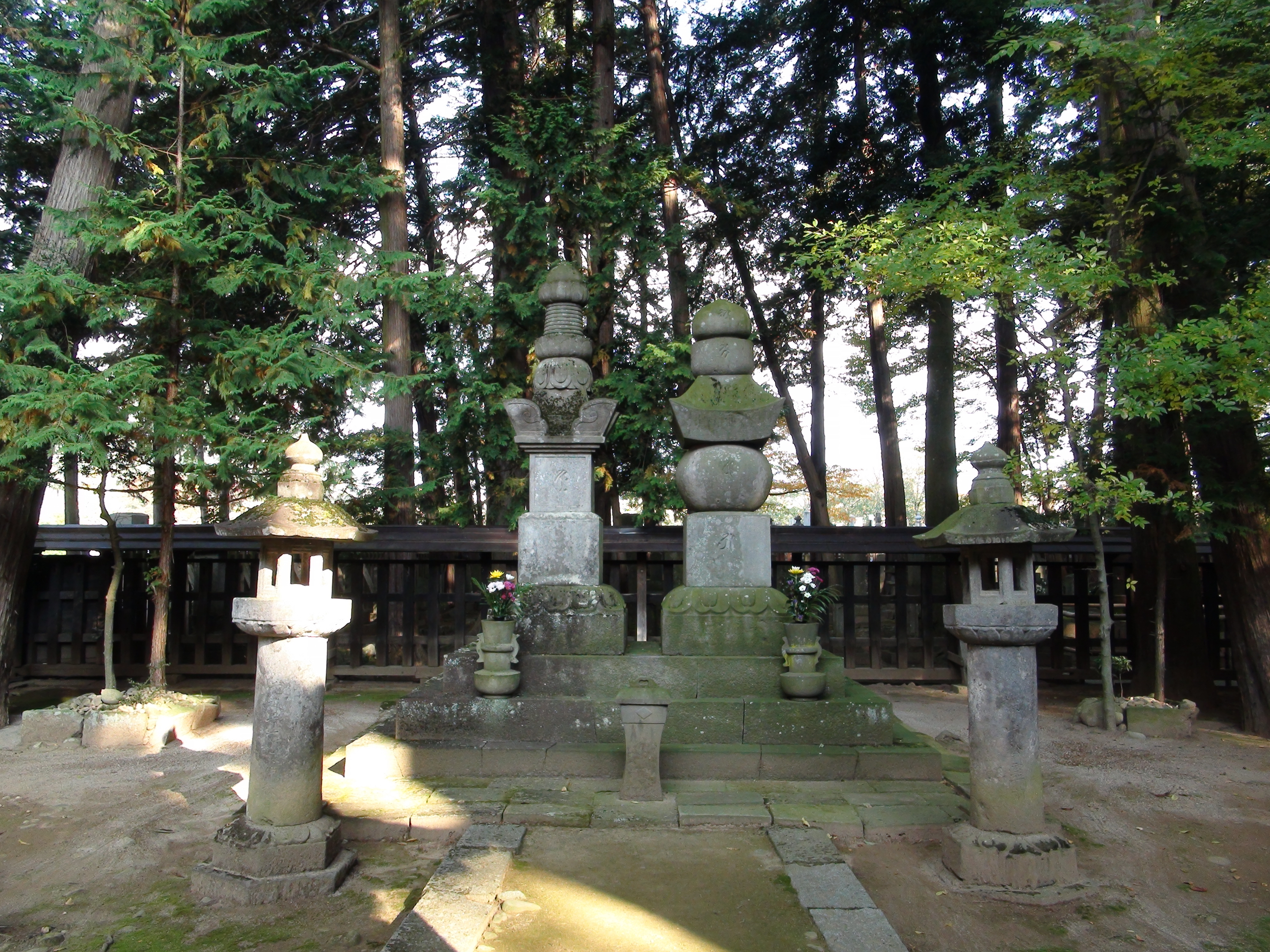
Grave of Takeda Shingen

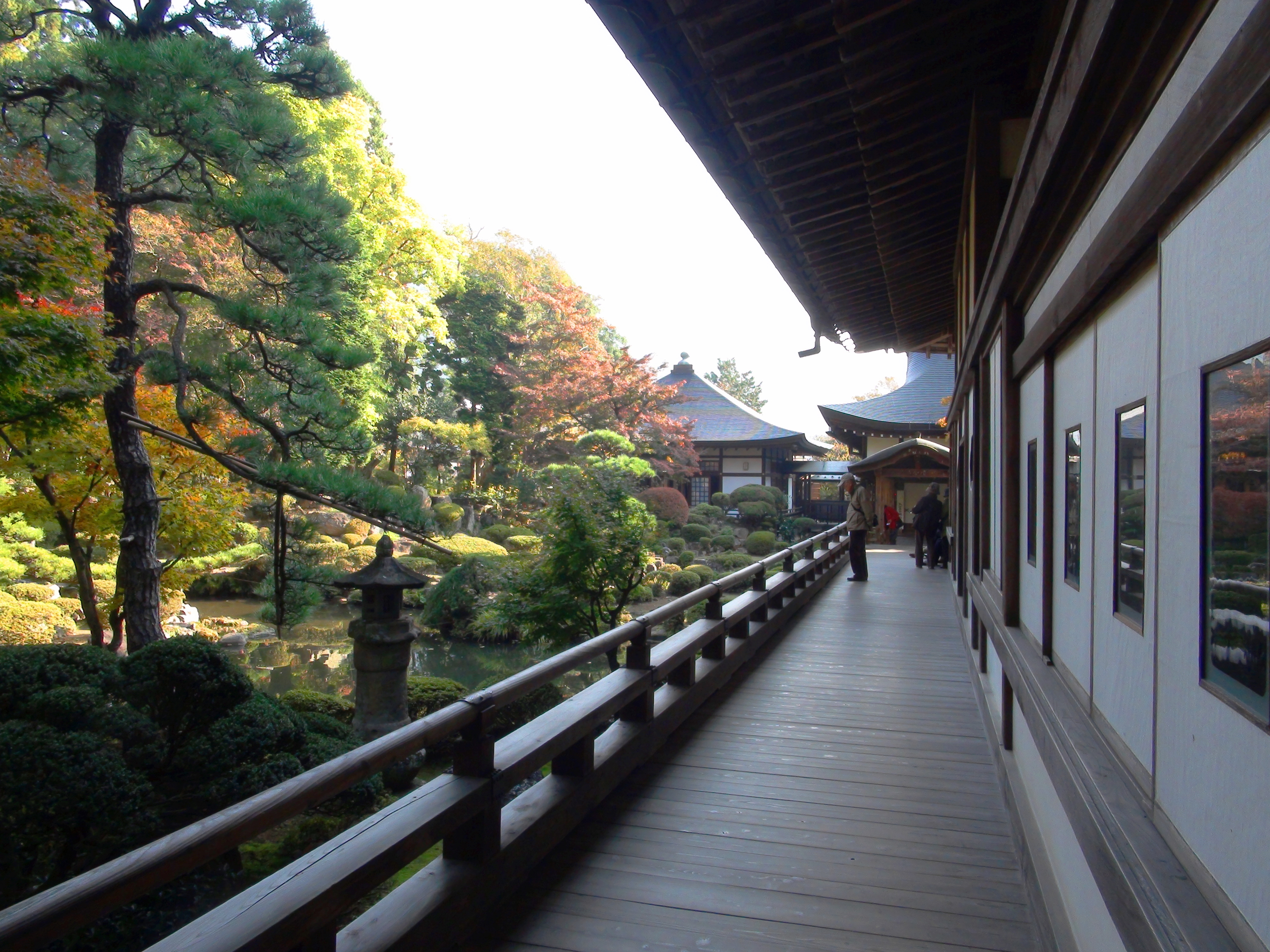
Engawa overlooking Erin-ji Gardens

== See also ==
- List of Places of Scenic Beauty of Japan (Yamanashi)
