= Kosuge =

Kosuge 小菅村
- Village
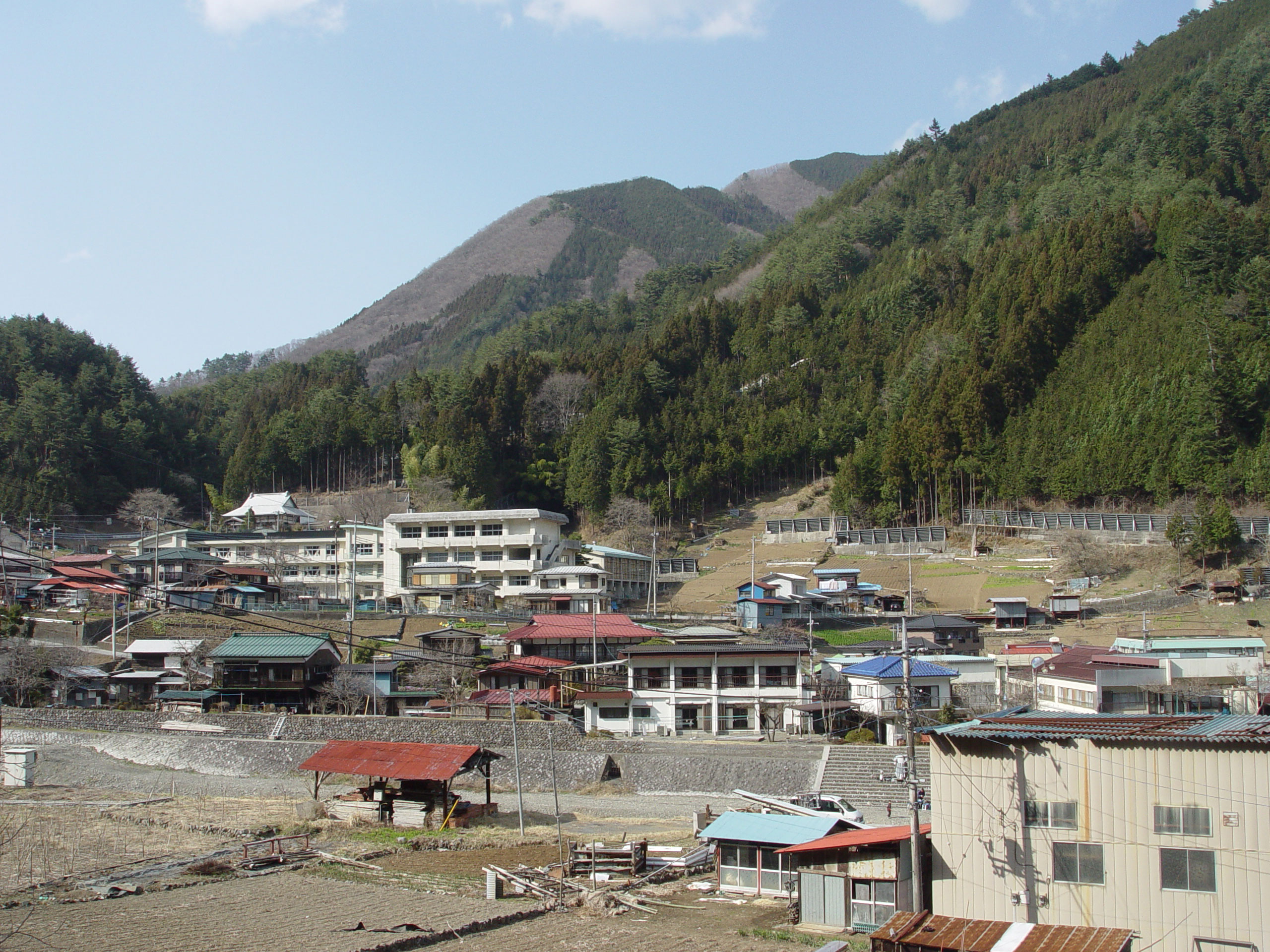
- View of Kosuge Village

- Flag Seal

- Location of Kosuge in Yamanashi Prefecture

- Location within Japan
- Coordinates: 35°45′36.9″N 138°56′25″E
- Country: Japan
- Region: Chūbu; Tōkai
- Prefecture: Yamanashi Prefecture
- District: Kitatsuru

Area
  - Total: 52.78 km^{2} (20.38 sq mi)

Population (October 1, 2020)
  - Total: 684
  - Density: 13.0/km^{2} (33.6/sq mi)
- Time zone: UTC+9 (Japan Standard Time)
- Phone number: 0428-87-0111
- Address: 4698 Kosuke-mura, Kitatsuru-gun, Yamanashi 409-0211
- Website: Official website

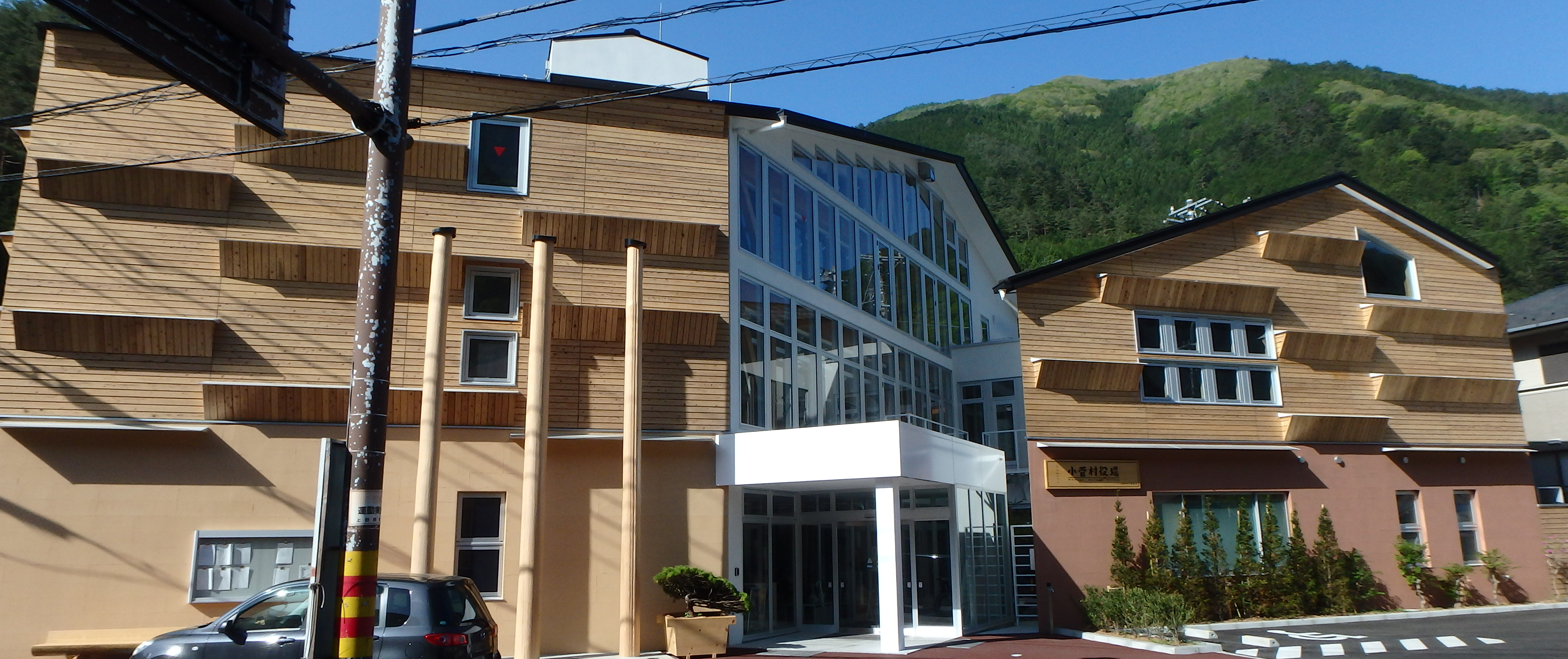
Kosuge village hall

Kosuge (小菅村, Kosuge-mura) is a village located in Yamanashi Prefecture, Japan. As of 31 October 2018, the village had an estimated population of 701, and a population density of 13 persons per km^{2}. The total area of the village is 52.65 square kilometres (20.33 sq mi).

== Geography ==
Kosuge is located in the mountainous far northeastern corner of Yamanashi Prefecture. The municipality consists of eight hamlets of Hashidate, Kawaike, Tadamoto, Nakagumi, Tobu, Shirasawa, Konagata, Nagasaku. The seven villages from Hashidate to Konagata are along the Kobuchi River in the Tama River water system, and the Nagakushi village is along the Tsurugawa River in the Sagami River water system. The hamlets have elevations between 540 and 780 meters. Forest occupies 95% of the total area of the village, with 30% protected watershed forest within the Chichibu Tama Kai National Park, providing water for the Tokyo Metropolis.

=== Neighboring municipalities ===
Tokyo metropolis:

- Okutama

Yamanashi Prefecture:

- Kōshū
- Otsuki
- Tabayama
- Uenohara

=== Climate ===
The village has a climate characterized by characterized by hot and humid summers, and relatively mild winters (Köppen climate classification Cfa). The average annual temperature in Kosuge is 8.9 °C. The average annual rainfall is 1552 mm with September as the wettest month. The temperatures are highest on average in August, at around 22.1 °C, and lowest in January, at around -2.2 °C.

== Demographics ==
Per Japanese census data, the population of Kosuge has decreased over the past 60 years.

Historical population
Year	Pop.	±%
1940	1,734	—
1950	2,160	+24.6%
1960	2,021	−6.4%
1970	1,461	−27.7%
1980	1,284	−12.1%
1990	1,177	−8.3%
2000	1,084	−7.9%
2010	816	−24.7%
2020	684	−16.2%

== History ==
During the Edo period, all of Kai Province was tenryō territory under direct control of the Tokugawa shogunate. During the cadastral reform of the early Meiji period on July 1, 1889, the village of Kosuge was created within Kitatsuru District, Yamanashi. Discussions to merge with the neighboring city of Kōshū, Yamanashi in 2008 have been shelved.

== Economy ==
The economy of Kosuge is primarily based on forestry and agriculture.

== Education ==
Kosuge has one public elementary school and one public junior high school operated by the village government. The village does not have a high school.

== Transportation ==
=== Railway ===
The village has no passenger rail service. The nearest train station is Oku-Tama Station in Okutama, Tokyo.

=== Buses ===
- All route buses operated in Kosuge stop at Kosuge-no-Yu bus stop.

No	Via	Destination	Company	Note
奥12	Mount Daibosatsu eastern gate・Miyama-bashi・Lake Okutama	Okutama Station	Nishi Tokyo Bus	Run only Holidays.
奥12	Miyama-bashi・Lake Okutama	Okutama Station	Nishi Tokyo Bus	Run only Holidays.
奥12	Tozura・Miyama-bashi・Lake Okutama	Okutama Station	Nishi Tokyo Bus	Run only Holidays.
	Fukashiro Dam・Take-no-mukai・Kamiwada・Saruhashi・Saruhashi Station・Otsuki Station	Ōtsuki Central Hospital	Fujikyū Bus
	Fukashiro Dam・Take-no-mukai・Kamiwada・Saruhashi・Saruhashi Station	Otsuki Station	Fujikyū Bus
	Fukashiro Dam・Take-no-mukai・Kamiwada・Saruhashi・Saruhashi Station	Fujikyu Bus Ōtsuki Office	Fujikyū Bus
Nagasaku Line	Tamoto-bashi・Yakuba-mae・Hashidate-shita(Mount Daibosatsu eastern gate)	Hashidate-ue	Kosuge Municipal Bus	Buses are operated on 3 services for Hashidate-ue and 1 service for Iio on weekdays morning．On some hours excluding weekdays morning, you are able to ride on the bus routes by you reserve the demand bus with calling phone to Kosuge, Yamanashi on holidays and between 10:30 and 18:30 on weekdays But, the services are suspension on Sundays.
Nagasaku Line	Tsuru Pass・Nagasaku	Iio	Kosuge Municipal Bus	Buses are operated on 3 services for Hashidate-ue and 1 service for Iio on weekdays morning．On some hours excluding weekdays morning, you are able to ride on the bus routes by you reserve the demand bus with calling phone to Kosuge, Yamanashi on holidays and between 10:30 and 18:30 on weekdays But, the services are suspension on Sundays.

=== Highway ===
- National Route 139
