= Mount Daibosatsu =

Mountain in Japan

- 大菩薩嶺
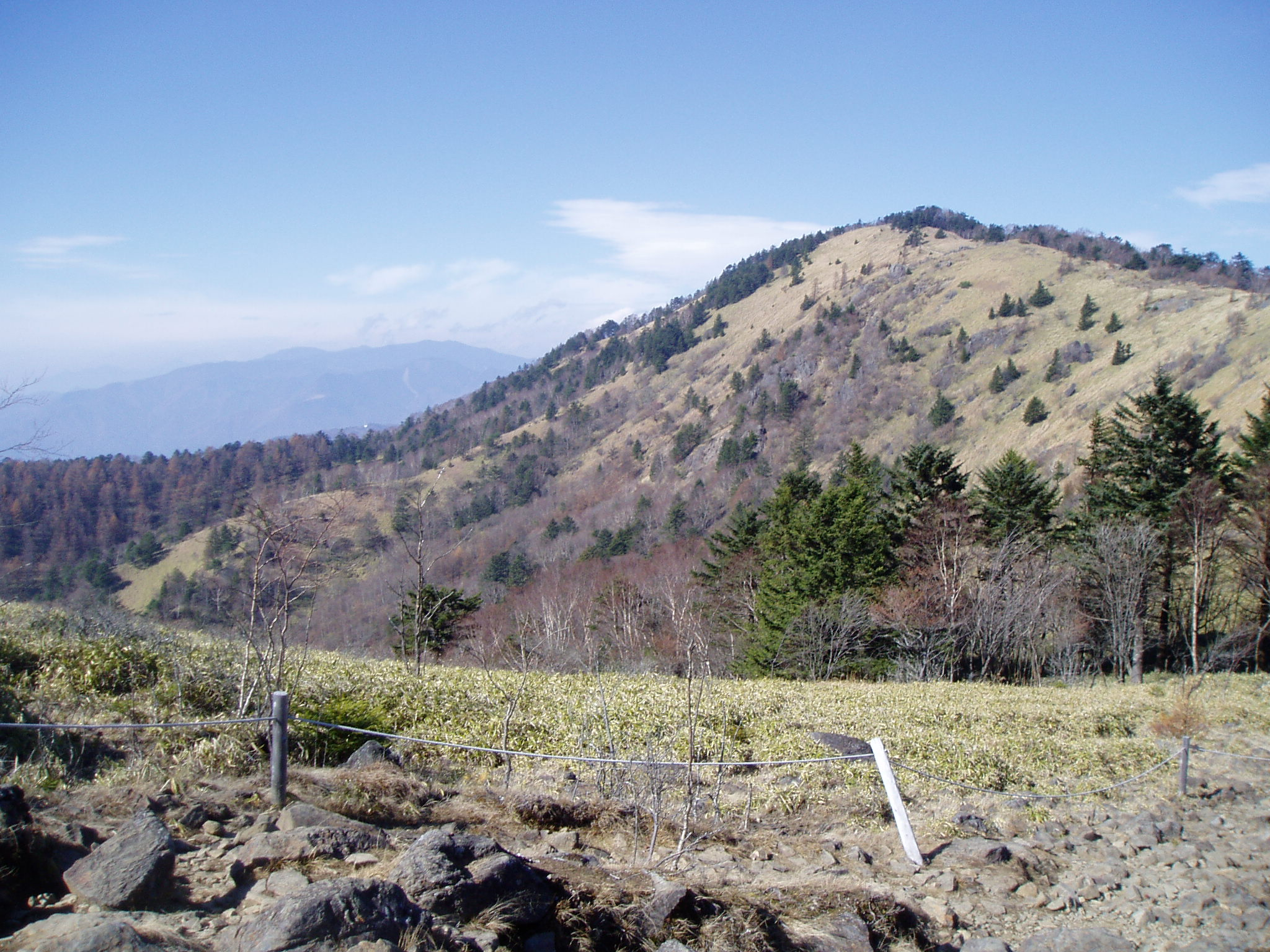
- View of Mount Daibosatsu from Sai-no-kawara, Yamanashi Prefecture, Japan

Highest point
- Elevation: 2,057 m (6,749 ft)
- Coordinates: 35.7487°N 138.8455°E

Naming
- Native name: 大菩薩嶺 (Japanese)

Geography
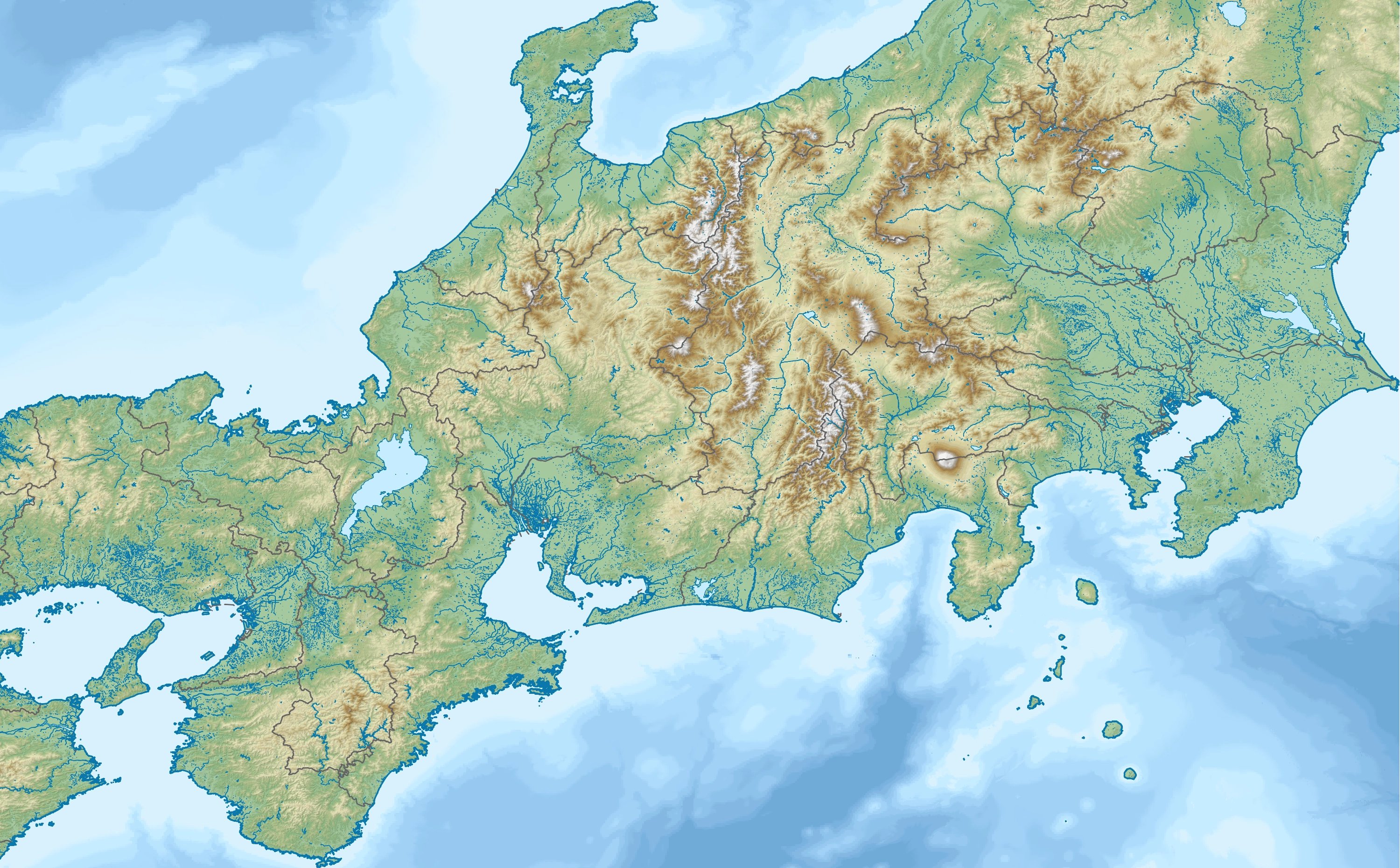
- Location within Yamanashi Prefecture Location within Central Japan Location within Japan
- Location: Yamanashi Prefecture, Japan

Mount Daibosatsu (大菩薩嶺, lit. ' Great Bodhisattva') stands in the Yamanashi side of Chichibu Tama Kai National Park. The peak itself is in Kōshū, Yamanashi. It is 2,057 metres (6,749 ft) high. Daibosatsu Pass divides Kōshū from Kosuge Village. Trails lead to the top from Kōshū, Tabayama, and Kosuge.

Daibosatsu is one of the 100 Famous Mountains of Japan.

== Outline ==
The mountain originally took a part of Ōme Kaidō in the Edo period, used to carry lime from Kai Province where produces lime to Edo. And, Edo bakufu established Taba-shuku near Mount Daibosatsu. Mount Daibosatsu has two famous passes, which was also called Daibosatsu-toge and Yanagisawa-toge respectively. Daibosatsu-toge had been used as Ome Kaido, which was an alternative to Kōshū Kaidō until Yanagisawa-toge was open to traffic in the Meiji era.

== Access ==
The start of trail up the Mount Daibosatsu is located near Hashidate-shita bus stop. In additional to it, 20 minutes' walk will bring you from Kosuge-no-Yu bus stop to the start. Their bus stops are operated by Nishi Tokyo Bus travel from/to Okutama Station, simultaneously Kosuge Municipal Bus and Fujikyu Bus travel from/to Otsuki Station or Uenohara Station.

Besides, Lodge Chōbē (ja:ロッヂ長兵衛) is near to the top of mountain, and the lodge is close to Kamihikawa bus stop. The bus stop is operated by Eiwa Transportation travel from/to Kai-Yamato Station.

Moreover, there is Daibosatsu-Tōge Tozanguchi bus stop, which is located Koshu, Yamanashi. The bus stop is operated by Koshu Municipal Bus travel from/to Enzan Station.

== See also ==
- Chichibu Tama Kai National Park
