= List of places of scenic beauty of Japan (Yamanashi) =

This list is of the places of scenic beauty of Japan located within the Prefecture of Yamanashi.

== National Places of Scenic Beauty ==
As of 1 August 2014, six Places have been designated at a national level (including two *Special Places of Scenic Beauty); Mount Fuji spans the prefectural borders with Shizuoka.

Site	Municipality	Comments	Image	Coordinates	Type	Ref.
*Mitake Shōsenkyō 御嶽昇仙峡; Mitake Shōsenkyō	Kōshū/Kai			35°44′41″N 138°33′59″E	5, 6	
*Mount Fuji 富士山; Fuji-san		also an Historic Site; the designation spans the prefectural borders with Shizuoka Prefecture		35°22′03″N 138°43′46″E	10	
Saru-hashi 猿橋; Saru-hashi	Ōtsuki			35°36′57″N 138°58′49″E	2, 6	
Erin-ji Gardens 恵林寺庭園; Erinji teien	Kōshū			35°43′49″N 138°42′50″E	1	
Kōgaku-ji Gardens 向嶽寺庭園; Kōgakuji teien	Kōshū			35°42′41″N 138°43′21″E	1	
Fuji Five Lakes 富士五湖; Fuji-goko	Fujikawaguchiko/Yamanakako/Minobu			35°30′58″N 138°44′56″E	7, 11	

== Prefectural Places of Scenic Beauty ==
As of 1 May 2014, five Places have been designated at a prefectural level.

Site	Municipality	Comments	Image	Coordinates	Type	Ref.
Tōkō-ji Gardens 東光寺庭園; Tōkōji teien	Kōfu			35°40′05″N 138°35′18″E		
Eian-ji Gardens 永安寺庭園; Eianji teien	Yamanashi			35°41′17″N 138°39′19″E		
Sankō-ji Gardens 三光寺庭園; Sankōji teien	Kōshū			35°40′39″N 138°44′52″E		
Daizen-ji Gardens 大善寺庭園; Daizenji teien	Kōshū			35°39′20″N 138°44′35″E		
Seiun-ji Gardens 棲雲寺庭園; Seiunji teien	Kōshū			35°39′38″N 138°48′38″E		

== Municipal Places of Scenic Beauty ==
As of 1 May 2014, eighteen Places have been designated at a municipal level.

== See also ==
- Cultural Properties of Japan
- List of parks and gardens of Yamanashi Prefecture
- List of Historic Sites of Japan (Yamanashi)
