= Kaisen Joki =

Japanese buddhist priest (1500–1582)

Kaisen Joki (快川紹喜, Kaisen Jōki; c. January 2, 1500 – April 25, 1582) was a Buddhist priest from Mino Province.

It is not known if he is related to the Toki clan. Following the rise to power of Saito Yoshitatsu, Joki fled to Owari Province. From there he went to Kai Province. There, Joki met Takeda Shingen and Shingen was very impressed by him. Shingen afterwards made Joki the head abbot of the Erin-ji in Kofu.

After the Oda–Tokugawa alliance invaded the territory of the Takeda in 1582, the Eirin-ji were accused of sheltering the likes of Rokkaku Yoshisuke (a former enemy of the Oda). This led to all the monks of the temple being burned to death. It is known that Joki was indeed very calm. Before Joki and his men would have died in the blazing fire, Joki is said to have told them to set their minds at ease so that even the fire might be thought of as cool and refreshing (心頭を滅却すれば火もまた涼し, Shintō o Mekkyaku Sureba Hi mo Mata Suzushi).
