= Saruhashi Bridge =

Historic bridge in Japan

Saruhashi 猿橋
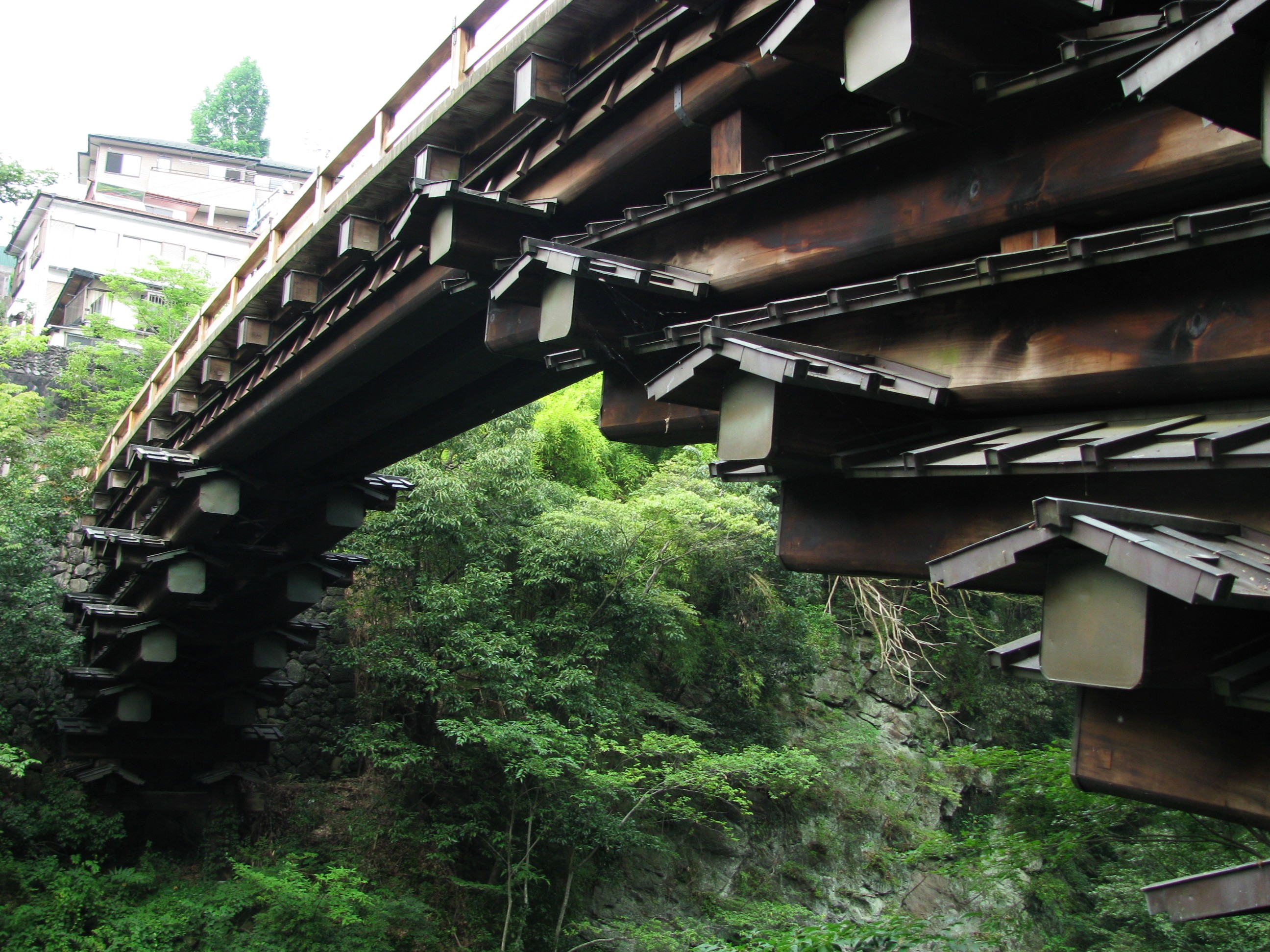
- Coordinates: 35°36′56.6″N 138°58′48.8″E
- Crosses: Katsura River
- Locale: Ōtsuki city, Yamanashi Prefecture, Japan
- Heritage status: Place of Scenic Beauty of Japan

Characteristics
- Material: Wood (supported by steel box girders)
- Total length: 30.9 m (101 ft); 175 m (574 ft) overall
- Width: 3.3 m (11 ft)
- Height: 31 m (102 ft)

History
- Construction end: c. 1756
- Rebuilt: 1984

Location
- Interactive map of Saruhashi

The Saruhashi Bridge (猿橋) is a historic arch bridge officially listed as a Place of Scenic Beauty of Japan in Ōtsuki, Yamanashi Prefecture. It is ranked as one of Japan's three unique bridges, along with the Kintai Bridge and the Shinkyo Bridge. It is also referred to as the monkey bridge

The bridge spans the gorge of the Katsura River and is the most well-known example of the hanebashi (刎橋) design, in which the bridge is supported by a series of cantilever beams set in the opposing cliff faces. The bridge dates to the mid-18th century, when it carried the Kōshū Kaidō, one of the main highways of the Edo period. The elegant design of the bridge and the scenic beauty of the gorge have inspired numerous landscape paintings of the 19th century.

== Design ==
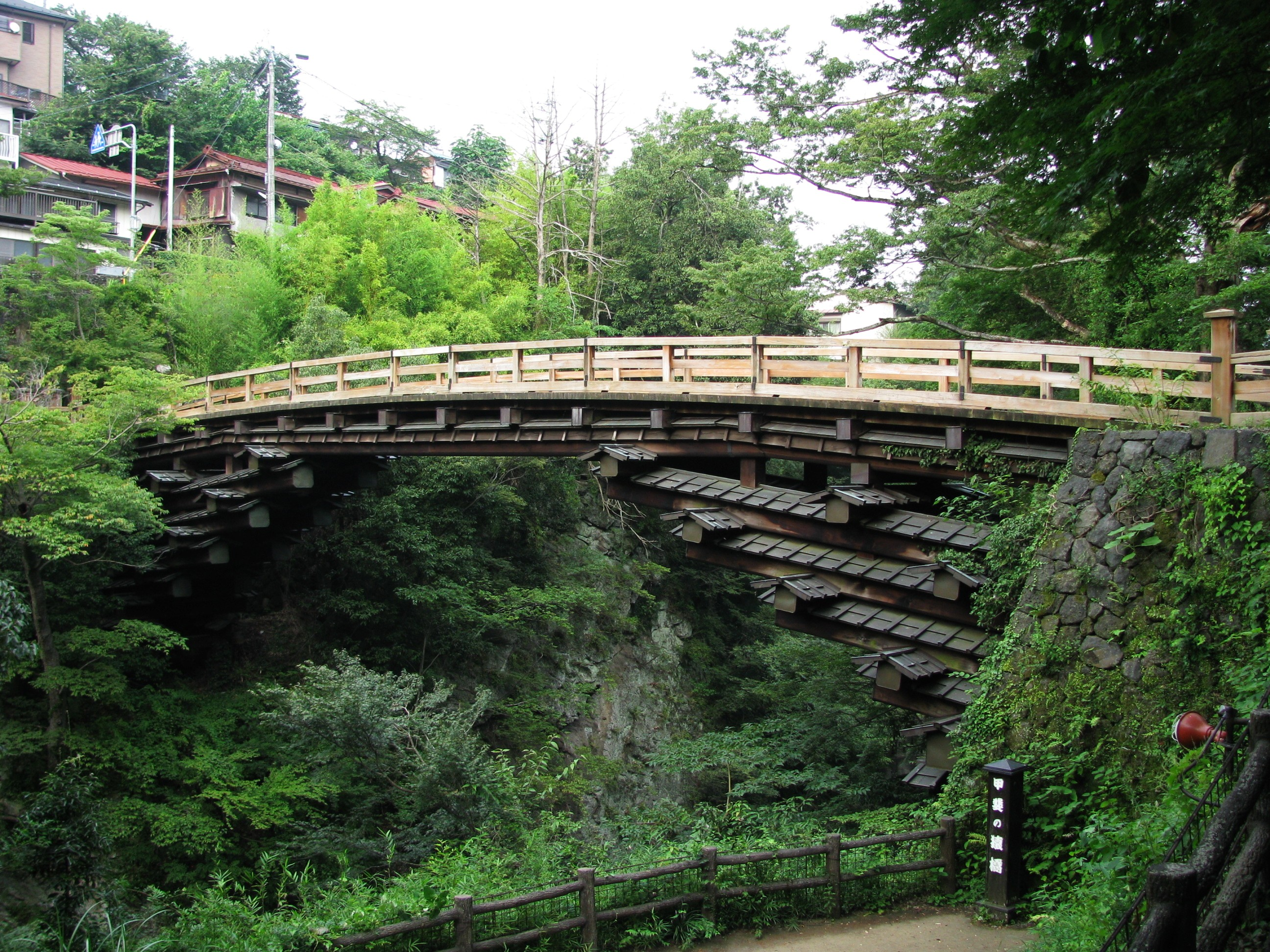
Saruhashi bridge

Saruhashi Bridge spans the deep gorge of the Katsura River at Ōtsuki city, Yamanashi, Japan. While suspension bridges are normally used under such conditions, where it is impractical to build a supporting pier, (Note: It was impractical to build a pier in the Katsura River due to the height of the cliffs, fluctuating water levels, and high currents during rainstorms and typhoons.) Saruhashi employs a design called hanebashi (刎橋) which was used during the Edo period (1603–1868).

Holes were made in the vertical rock faces of the cliffs to hold four pairs of inclined cantilever beams, called hanegi (羽根木), extending from either side. The lower pairs help support the load of the pairs above, which are of increasing length, with the gap between the opposing sets of beams spanned by a simple arch. Each beam has a small peaked roof to protect it from the elements.

The bridge is 3.3 metres (11 ft) wide, 30.9 m (101 ft) long, and crosses about 31 m (102 ft) above the Katsura River.

== History ==
=== Origin and medieval bridge ===
It is unclear when a bridge was first constructed at the site of Saruhashi. Its name, "monkey bridge", is associated with a local legend in which monkeys bridged the chasm with their bodies so that a couple could cross during the Nara period, c. 610. A later story tells that the original rickety plank structure was so precarious that "only an agile monkey could cross it".

According to the Kamakura Ōzōshi (鎌倉大草紙), a military record of the Kanto region during the Muromachi period, the war between Ashikaga Mochiuji and Takeda Nobunaga was held at "Saruhashi" in the early 15th century. In 1487, a Buddhist visited the area and wrote a journal that recorded the description of Saruhashi, along with Japanese songs and Chinese poems.

The Kamakura Ōzōshi records that Saruhashi was relocated by Nobuyoshi Oyamada in March 1520, to provide strategic control over the area. The bridge was important to Oyamada's feudal alliance, and was guarded by a strong garrison from 1524, with battles occurring in 1530. The Kamakura Ōzōshi notes that Saruhashi was destroyed by fire in 1533 and rebuilt in 1540.

=== Early modern period ===
Bridge reconstruction has been recorded since 1676, and it has followed the hanebashi design from 1756 or earlier.

Saruhashi became the most well-known hanebashi bridge as it carried the Kōshū Kaidō, one of the five main highways of the Edo period, which extended west from Edo (now Tokyo). It was noted by literary figures Ogyū Sorai and Shibue Chohaku, who included it in journals and poems. Numerous artists of the 19th century made paintings of the scenic bridge (see below).

In 1880, the Emperor Meiji made a tour of Yamanashi Prefecture and crossed the Saruhashi on 18 June.

=== Modern Saruhashi ===
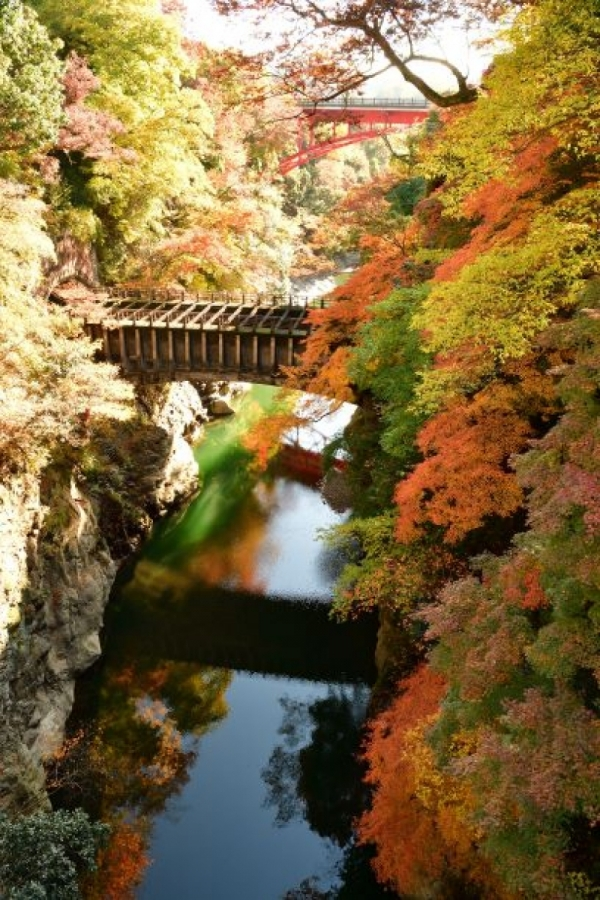
View from the Saruhashi Bridge in autumn

On 25 March 1932, Saruhashi Bridge was designated as a Place of Scenic Beauty of Japan. At the time of the designation, the village was considered to be in the village of Hirosato. However, the village lacked funds to manage and maintain the bridge, so Saruhashi was an independent historical site. The problem of its management was decided when Ōtsuki city was established in 1963, and assumed responsibility for the bridge. In 1984, there was a major restoration of the bridge, which replaced the wooden cantilever beams with steel box girders set in concrete. The girders were shrouded in a wooden facade to preserve the original appearance of the bridge. It is the only remaining hanebashi bridge in Japan that retains wood as its main material.

In 1934, Shinsaruhashi Bridge was built upstream to carry national route 8 (now Yamanashi prefectural road 505). Another bridge was constructed downstream in 1973, carrying national route 20.

== Tourism ==
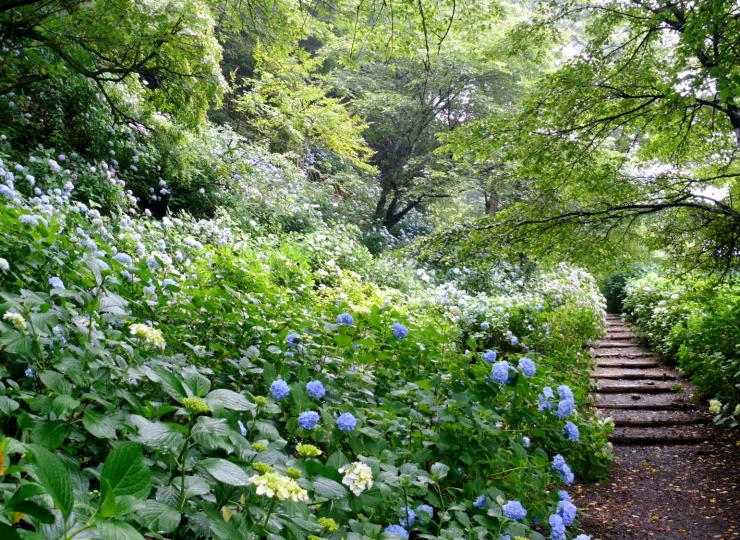
Saruhashi in Ajisai Festivals

Saruhashi bridge has been remarked upon by many travellers during its long history. The elegant design of the bridge complements the landscape of Katsura gorge, with its maples and zelkova. The bridge is sometimes remarked to appear to "float" above the gorge. Boat tours of the valley are available, when conditions permit.

A popular time to view the scenery is early to mid-November, to take advantage of the autumn leaf color changes. In summer, during late June and early July, hydrangeas bloom around the bridge and Saruhashi Park, marked by Ōtsuki's Hydrangea Festival (ajisai festival).

== In art ==
Several notable artists have depicted Saruhashi in scenic landscapes.

In 1817, Ukiyo-e artist Hokusai drew Saruhashi in "Hokusai Manga 7 volumes Kai Saruhashi".

Shōtei Hokuju (昇亭北寿) created a picture of Saruhashi bridge in 1818. Hokuju placed the bridge in the center of the composition, with nothing but sky and clouds behind the bridge and mountains on the side, so that the bridge appears to be floating in the sky. This print may demonstrate the level of understanding of Western perspective by Japanese artists of the time.

In 1841, Ukiyo-e Utagawa Hiroshige visited Kōshū via the Kōshū Kaidō, recording the sights of his journey in the Koshu Nikki (Record of the Days in May 1841, Year of the Ox), which informed his later work. According to Usui Kojima, this included sketches of the view and bridge of Saruhashi. Hiroshige worked on a large-scale woodblock printing called Koyo Saruhashi, which was published by Takubo Yoshizo c. 1842. This painting was of Saruhashi bridge in autumn with colorful leaves behind the valley.

Katsushika Taito II drew Full Moon Beneath the Monkey Bridge (fig. 1), between 1843 and 1847. Placing the full moon below the level of the bridge, casting shadows of the boats on the placid water below, emphasized the height of the bridge framed by the rugged cliffs and bridge, with a distant village in the background.

Katsushika Hokusai is regarded as one of the most influential and creative minds in the history of Japanese art. His unique social observations, innovative approach to design and mastery of the brush made him famous in Edo-period Japan and globally recognized within a decade of his death. He created major paintings of Saruhashi in 1842 and 1853 (fig. 2 and 3). These are collected in Twentieth-century Japanese prints and Hiroshige's journey in the 60-odd provinces.

Artist Tomioka Tessai visited Yamanashi Prefecture in 1875 and 1890. He painted Koyo Saruhashi which is part of the Oki Collection.

Kobayashi Kiyochika created the painting Monkey Bridge (Saruhashi) (fig. 4) in 1896.

fig. 1: Full moon beneath the Monkey Bridge

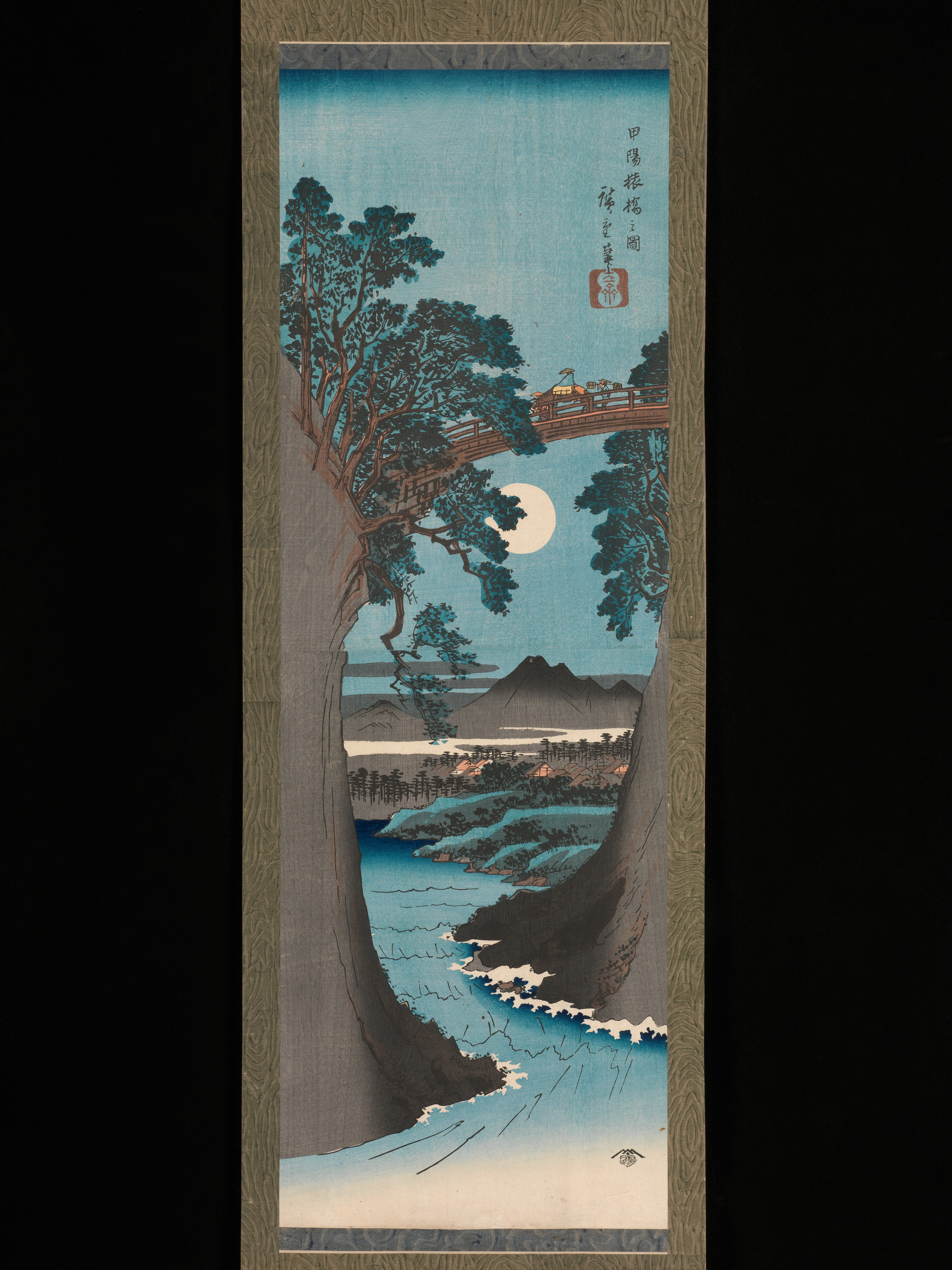
fig. 2: The Monkey Bridge in Kai Province (甲陽猿橋之図)

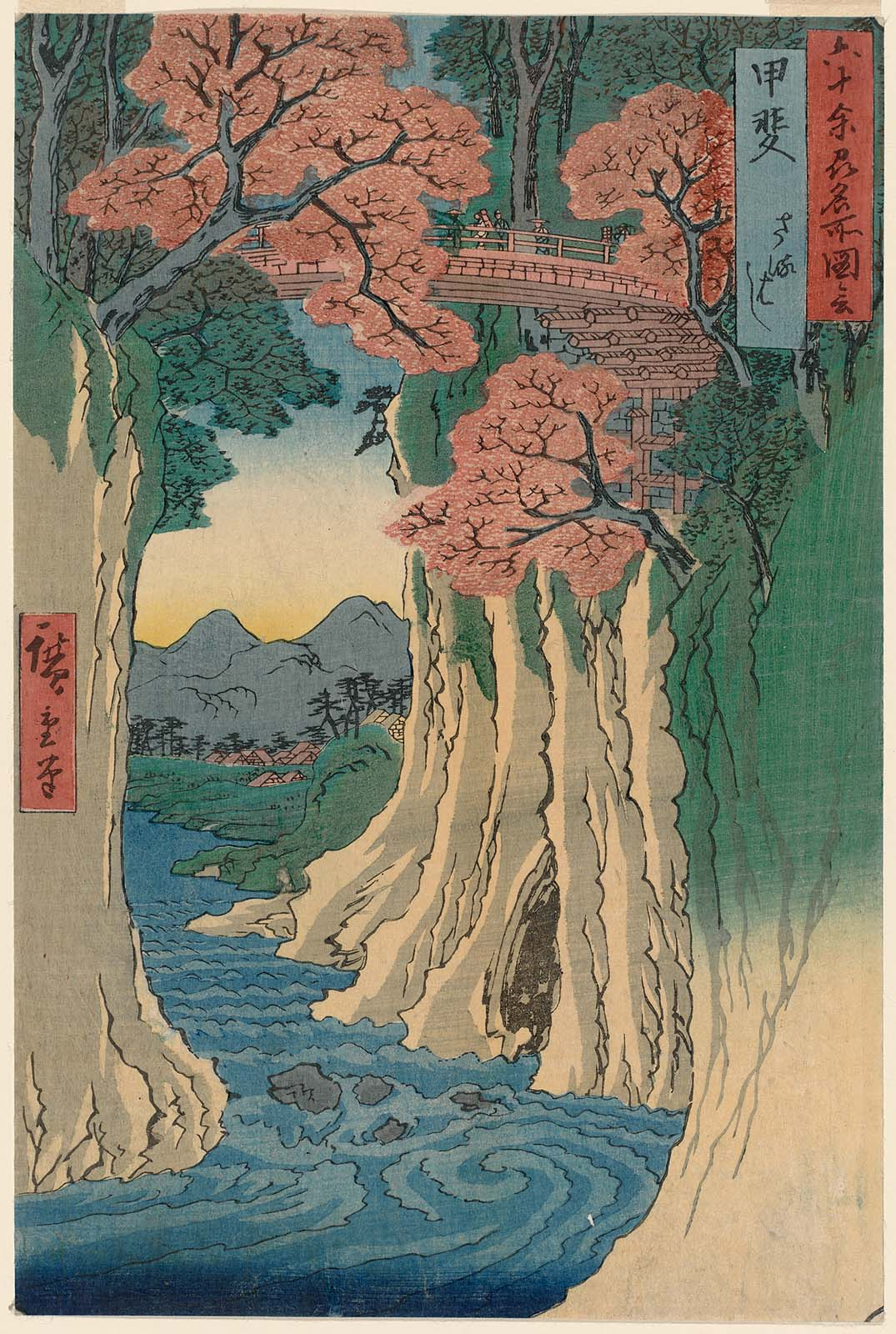
fig. 3: Kai Province, Monkey Bridge (Kai, Saruhashi)

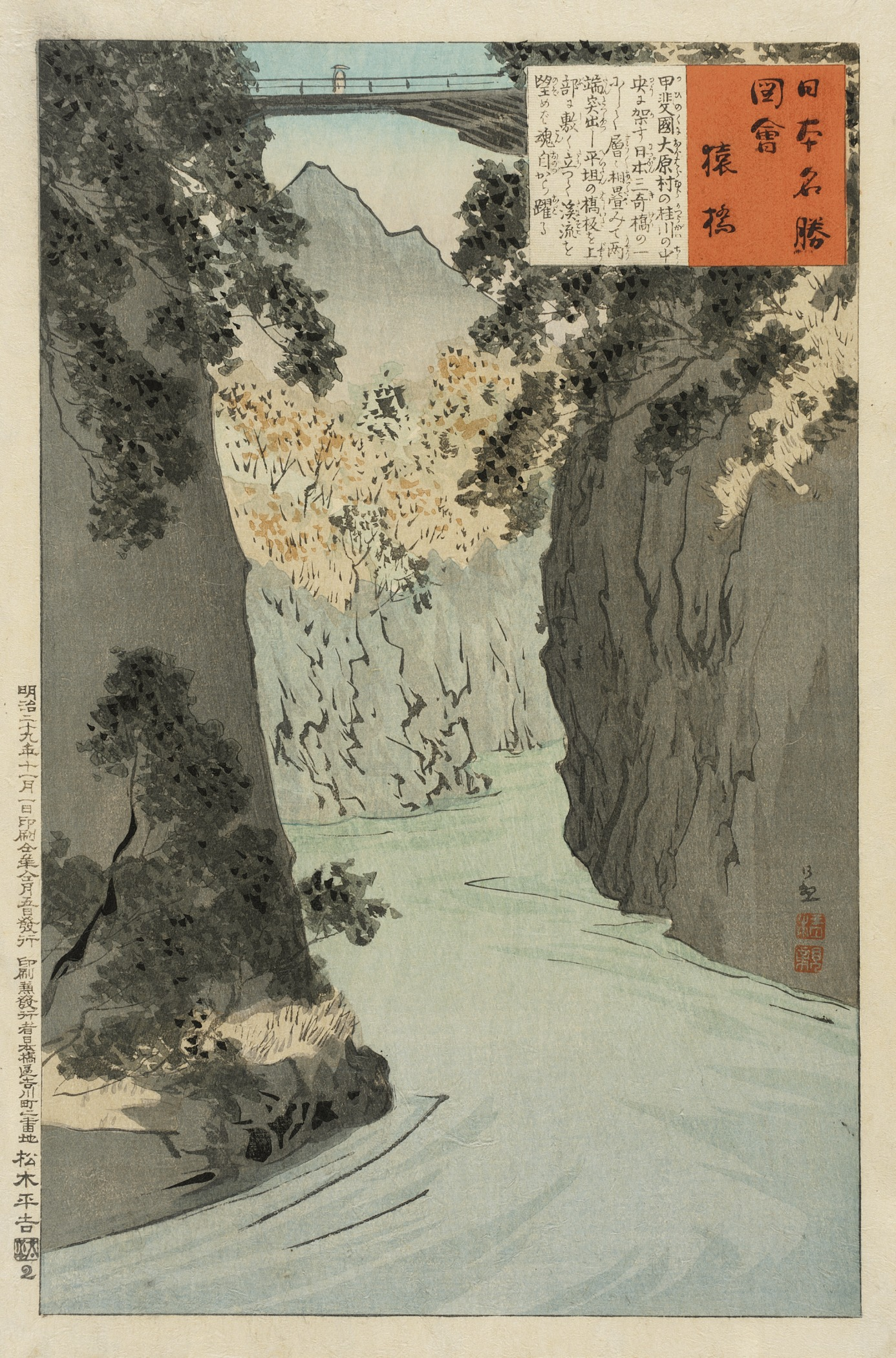
fig. 4: Monkey Bridge (Saruhashi)

== See also ==
- Saruhashi Station
- Ōtsuki, Yamanashi
- Kintai Bridge
