= Tabayama =

Tabayama 丹波山村
- Village
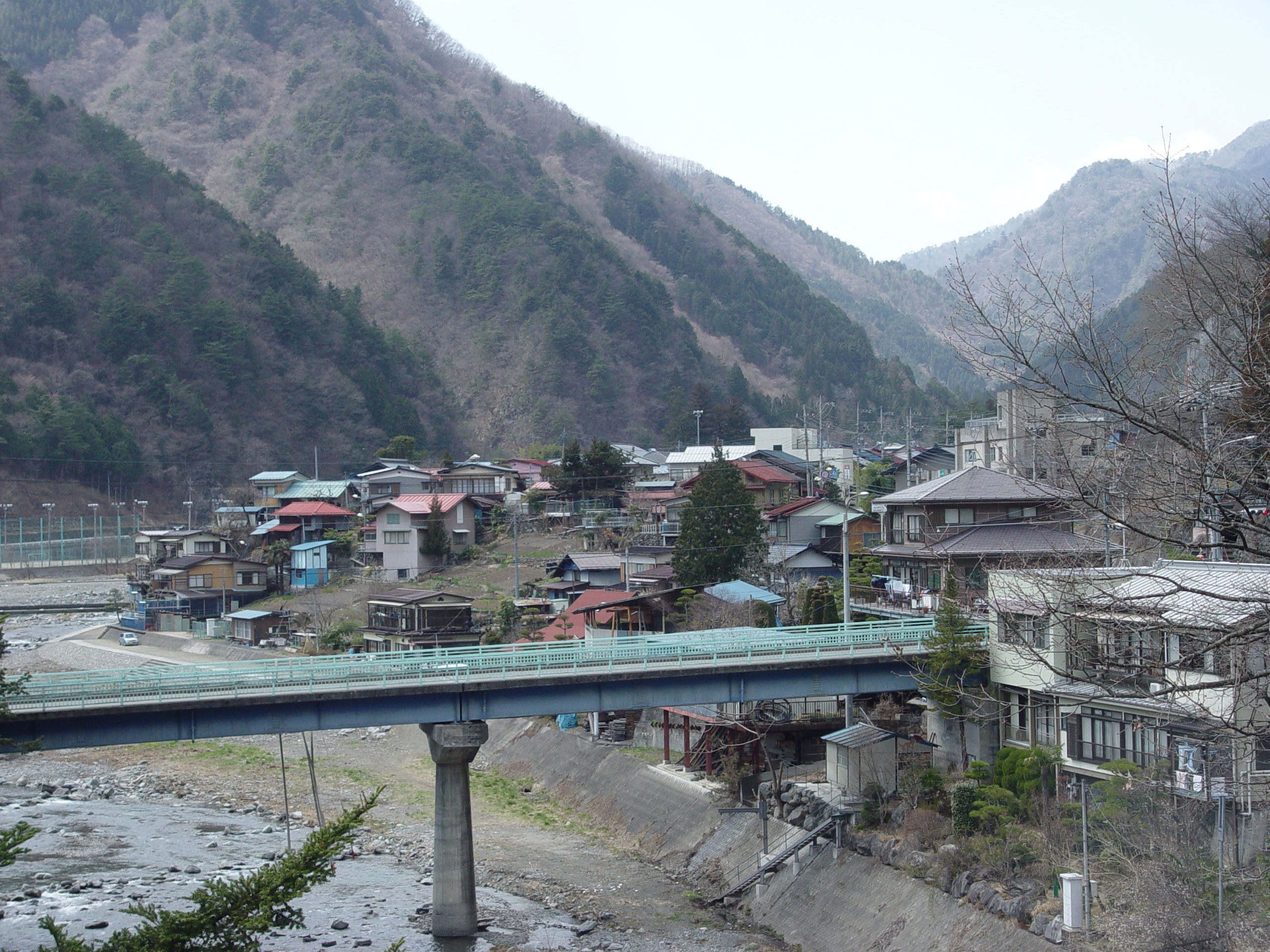
- View of Tabayama Village

- Flag Seal

- Location of Tabayama in Yamanashi Prefecture

- Coordinates: 35°47′23″N 138°55′19.9″E
- Country: Japan
- Region: Chūbu; Tōkai
- Prefecture: Yamanashi Prefecture
- District: Kitatsuru

Area
  - Total: 101.30 km^{2} (39.11 sq mi)

Population (October 1, 2020)
  - Total: 530
  - Density: 5.2/km^{2} (14/sq mi)
- Time zone: UTC+9 (Japan Standard Time)
- Tree: Beech
- Flower: Rhododendron dilatatum
- Phone number: 0428-88-0211
- Address: 890 Tabayama-mura, Kitatsuru-gun, Yamanashi-ken 409-0305
- Website: Official website

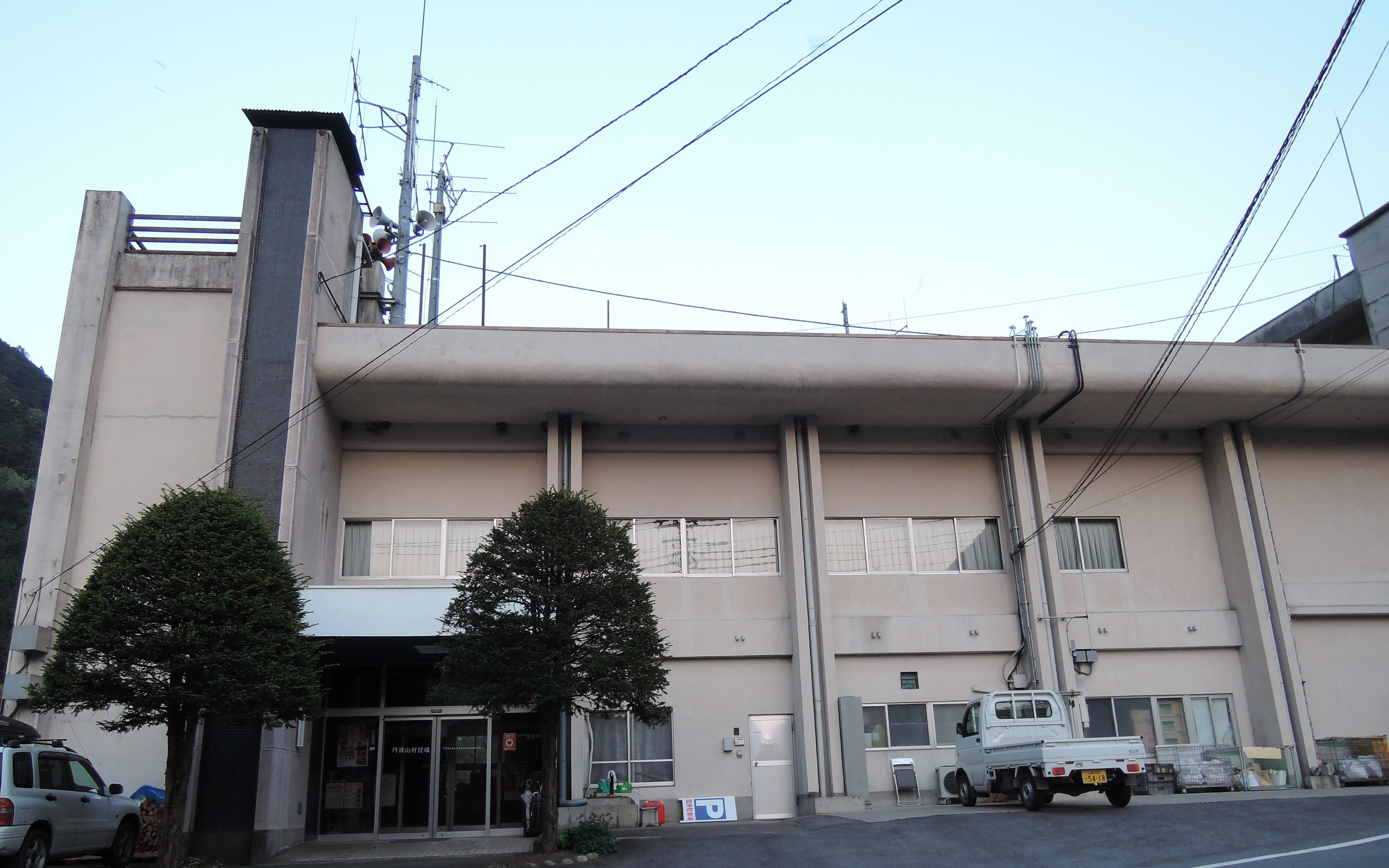
Tabayma Village Hall

Tabayama (丹波山村, Tabayama-mura) is a village located in Yamanashi Prefecture, Japan. As of 1 October 2020, the village had an estimated population of 530, and a population density of 5.79 persons per km^{2}. The total area of the village is 101.30 square kilometres (39.11 sq mi).

== Geography ==
Located in the northeastern corner of Yamanashi Prefecture, the village is very mountainous. An estimated 97% of the village is covered by forests. The village is located within the borders of Chichibu Tama Kai National Park.

- Mountains: Mount Kumotori, Mount Daibosatsu, Mount Hiryū, Mount Nanatsuishi, Iwadake
- Rivers: Taba River, Kaizawa River, Atoyama River
- Lakes: Lake Okutama

=== Surrounding municipalities ===
- Saitama Prefecture
  - Chichibu
- Tokyo
  - Okutama
- Yamanashi Prefecture
  - Kōshū
  - Kosuge

=== Climate ===
The village has a climate characterized by characterized by hot and humid summers, and relatively mild winters (Köppen climate classification Cfa). The average annual temperature in Tabayama is 10.9 °C. The average annual rainfall is 1408 mm with September as the wettest month. The temperatures are highest on average in August, at around 23.5 °C, and lowest in January, at around -1.1 °C.

== Demographics ==
Per Japanese census data, the population of Tabayama has decreased substantially over the past 60 years.

Historical population
Year	Pop.	±%
1940	1,904	—
1950	2,180	+14.5%
1960	2,261	+3.7%
1970	1,581	−30.1%
1980	1,197	−24.3%
1990	1,037	−13.4%
2000	866	−16.5%
2010	685	−20.9%
2020	530	−22.6%

== History ==
During the Edo period, all of Kai Province was tenryō territory under direct control of the Tokugawa shogunate. During the cadastral reform of the early Meiji period on July 1, 1889, the village of Tabayama was created within Kitatsuru District, Yamanashi Prefecture. Most of the land in the village has been protected watershed, providing water for the Tokyo Metropolis since 1901, under the control of Tokyo Metropolitan Government Bureau of Waterworks. Discussions have taken place to merge Tabayama with neighboring Kōshū, but were suspended in 2008.

== Economy ==
The economy of Tabayama is primarily based on forestry and agriculture.

== Education ==
Tabayama has one public elementary school and one public junior high school operated by the village government. The village does not have a high school.

== Transportation ==
=== Railway ===
The village has no passenger rail service. The nearest train station is Oku-Tama Station in Okutama, Tokyo.

=== Highway ===
- National Route 411
