= Fukashiro Dam =

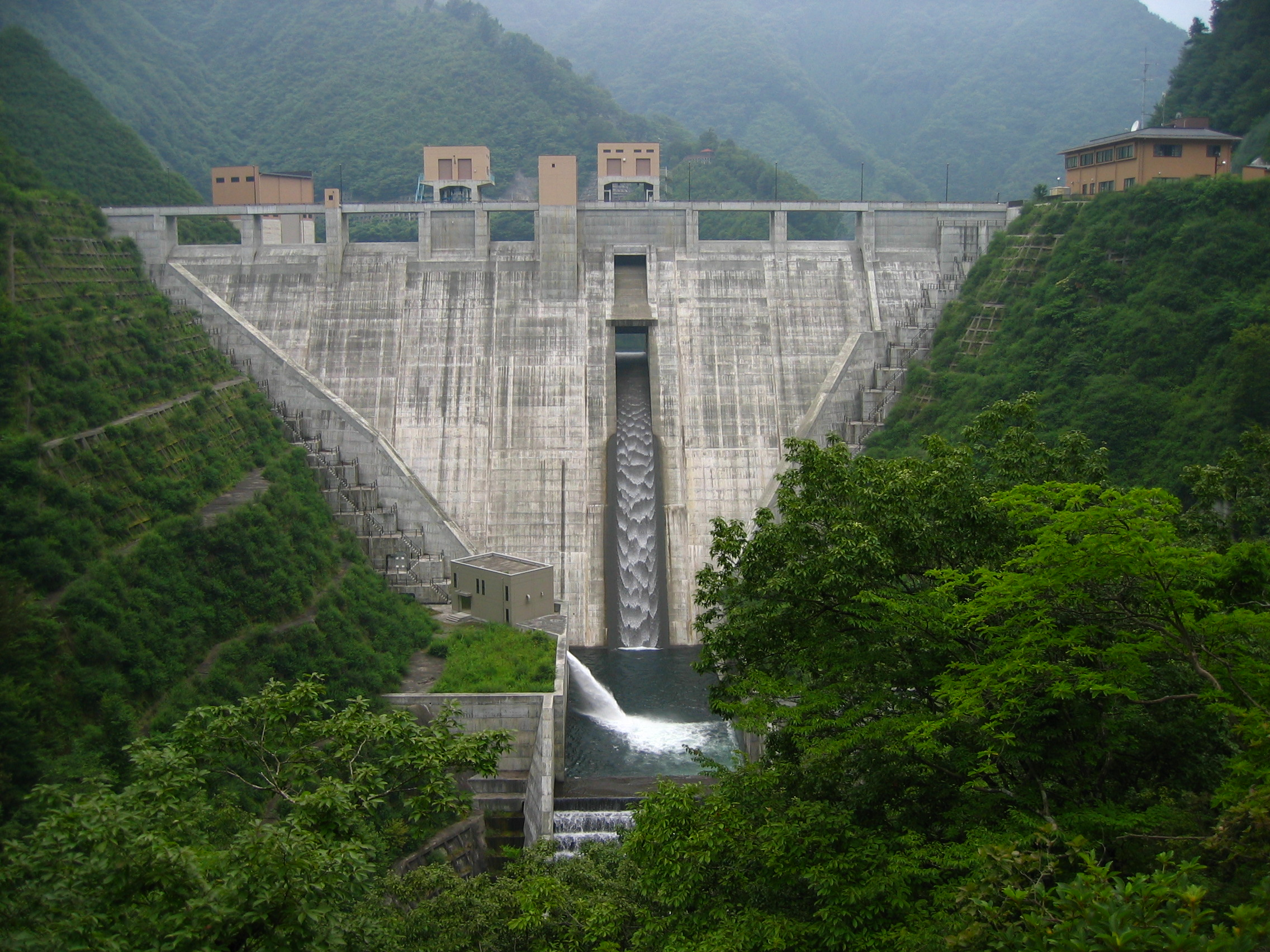

- Location within Japan
- Country: Japan
- Location: Ōtsuki
- Coordinates: 35°42′28″N 138°56′54″E
- Status: Operational
- Construction began: 1996
- Opening date: 2004

Dam and spillways
- Type of dam: Concrete gravity
- Height: 87 m (285 ft)
- Length: 164 m (538 ft)
- Dam volume: 200,000 m^{3} (261,590 cu yd)
- Spillway capacity: 790 m^{3}/s (27,899 cu ft/s)

Reservoir
- Total capacity: 6,440,000 m^{3} (5,221 acre⋅ft)
- Active capacity: 5,140,000 m^{3} (4,167 acre⋅ft)
- Catchment area: 43.3 km^{2} (17 sq mi)

The Fukashiro Dam is a gravity dam in the Sagami River system, located 11 km (7 mi) north of Ōtsuki in Yamanashi Prefecture, Japan. The purpose of the dam is flood control and water supply. Plans for the dam were drawn up in 1978 and construction on the diversion tunnels began in 1996. The dam reached its height in 2001 and in 2003, the reservoir began to fill. By 2004, the entire dam was complete. It is 87 m (285 ft) tall and 164 m (538 ft) long at the crest. The dam's main spillway consists of five free overflow openings with a 790 m^{3}/s (27,899 cu ft/s) discharge capacity. To handle additional discharges, there are two additional openings on the dam's orifice and two jet flow openings as part of the outlet works.

== See also ==
- Kazunogawa Pumped Storage Power Station – located upstream
