= Yuzurihara =

Village in Yamanashi Prefecture, Japan

Coordinates: 35.674°N 139.088°E

Yuzurihara (棡原村, Yuzurihara-mura)

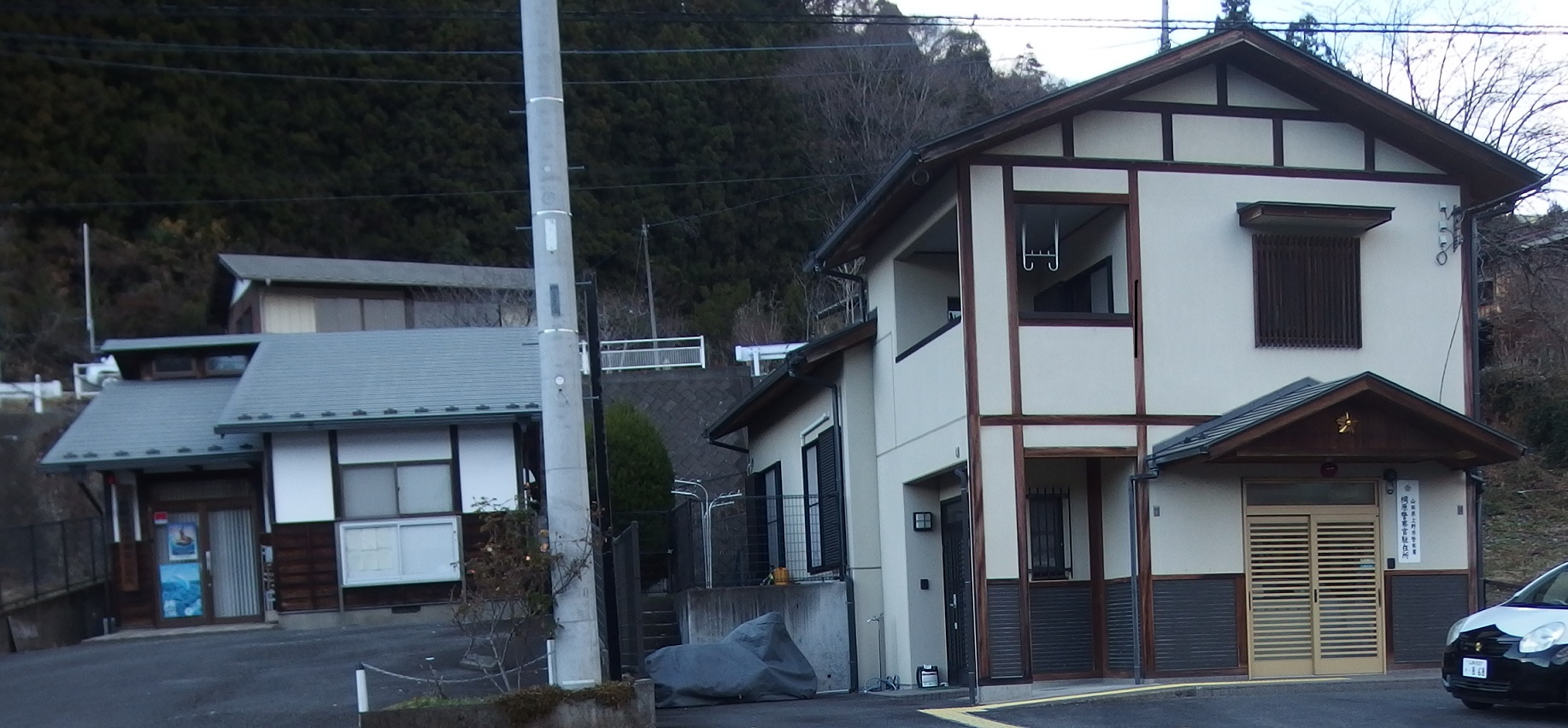
Left is the Yuzuhara Branch Office of Uenohara City Hall, and right is the Yuzuhara Police Station of Uenohara Police.

was a village in Yamanashi Prefecture in Japan which in 1955, together with the villages of Nishihara, Shimada, Otsuru, Iwaomura, Koto and Ome, were merged into the municipality of Uenohara.

The area is located easternmost tip of Yamanashi Prefecture, bordering Tokyo. As of September 2010, it was divided into 10 administrative districts: Nobori, Ozuzu, Yotake, Kobuse, Ido, Tsubaki, Inomaru, Hihara, Sawando, and Ogakigasato. The central settlement of the town is located at an elevation of 400 to 450 feet in a river terrace.

== Demographics ==
Historical population
| Year | Pop. | ±% |
|---|---|---|
| 1995 | 1,729 | — |
| 2000 | 1,554 | −10.1% |
| 2005 | 1,380 | −11.2% |
| 2010 | 1,218 | −11.7% |
| 2015 | 1,019 | −16.3% |
| 2020 | 853 | −16.3% |

In 1906, the official population of the village was noted as 3204.
