= Kiyosato =

Kiyosato may refer to the name of several places in Japan:

- Kiyosato, Hokkaidō, a town in Shari District, Abashiri Subprefecture, Hokkaidō
- Kiyosato, Niigata, a ward in the city of Jōetsu, Niigata, formerly a village
- Kiyosato, Yamanashi, a region in the city of Hokuto, Yamanashi, formerly part of Takane, Yamanashi
  - Kiyosato Station, a nearby station
