= Uenohara, Yamanashi (town) =

Dissolved municipality in Yamanashi prefecture, Japan

Uenohara (上野原町, Uenohara-chō) was a town located in Kitatsuru District, Yamanashi Prefecture, Japan.

As of 2004, the area within the former town of Uenohara had an estimated population of 26555 and a density of 211.58 persons per km^{2}. The total area was 125.51 km^{2}.

== History ==
On February 13, 2005, Uenohara (formerly from Kitatsuru District), absorbed the village of Akiyama (from Minamitsuru District) to create the city of Uenohara.

== Geography ==
- Mountains: Mount Mikuni, Mount Ōgi, Mount Mitō
- Rivers: Sagami River, Nakama River, Tsuru River

== Surrounding municipalities ==
The following are the municipalities that surrounded the town of Uenohara before it was merged.

- Yamanashi Prefecture
  - Ōtsuki
  - Kosuge
  - Akiyama
- Tokyo
  - Hinohara
- Kanagawa Prefecture
  - Fujino
