= Kiyosato Station =

Railway station in Hokuto, Yamanashi Prefecture, Japan

Kiyosato Station 清里駅
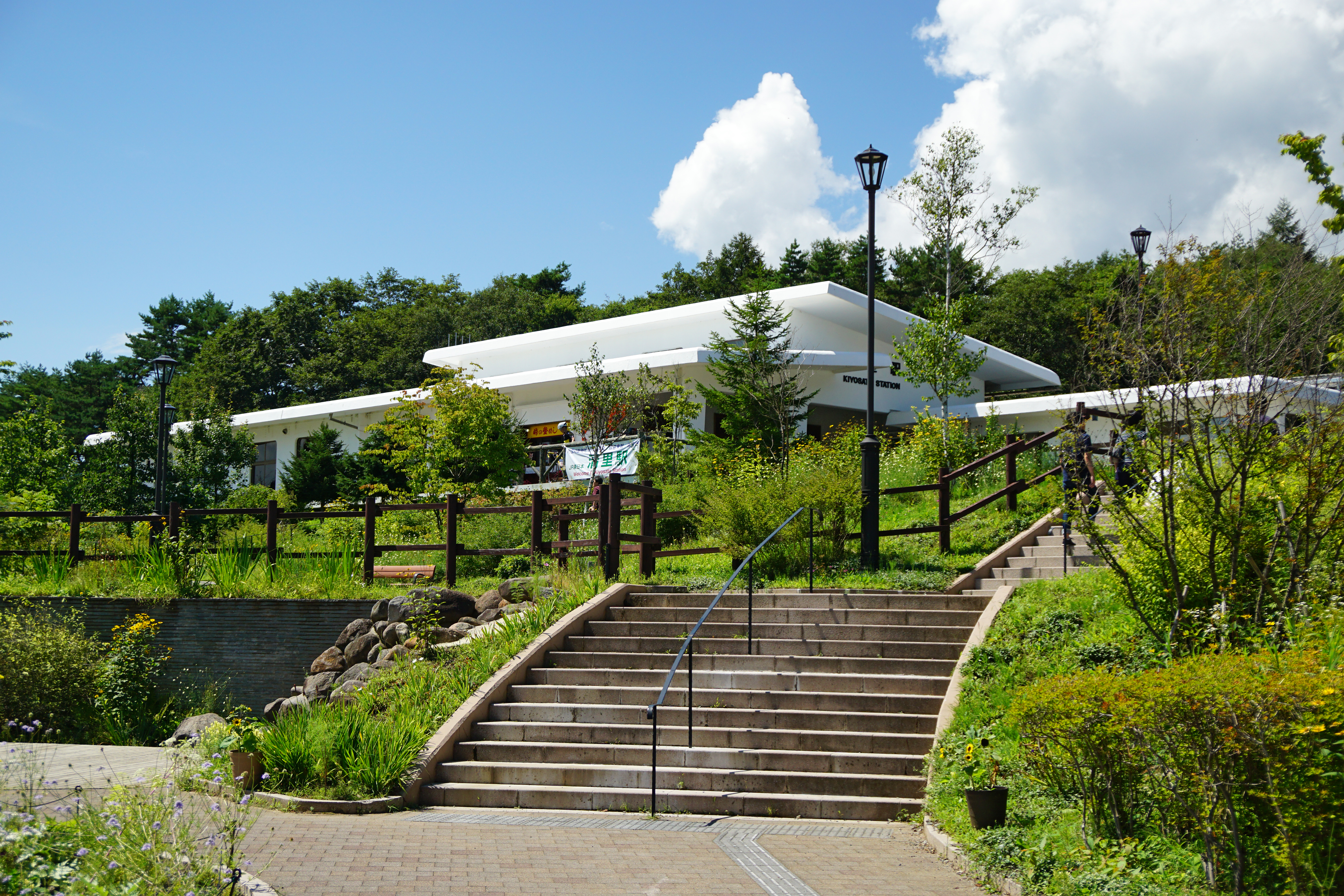

General information
- Location: 3545 Kiyosato, Takane Town, Hokuto City, Yamanashi Prefecture 407-0301; Japan
- Coordinates: 35°55′09″N 138°26′12″E
- Elevation: 1,275 m (4,183 ft)
- Operator: JR East
- Line: Koumi Line
- Distance: 17.5 km (10.9 mi) from Kobuchizawa
- Platforms: 2 side platforms
- Tracks: 2

Construction
- Structure type: At grade

Other information
- Status: Staffed
- Website: Official website

History
- Opened: 29 July 1933; 93 years ago

Passengers
- FY2021: 82 daily

Services
Preceding station	JR East	Following station
Nobeyama towards Komoro	Koumi Line	Kai-Ōizumi towards Kobuchizawa
Location
- Location within Yamanashi Prefecture Location within Chubu region Location within Japan

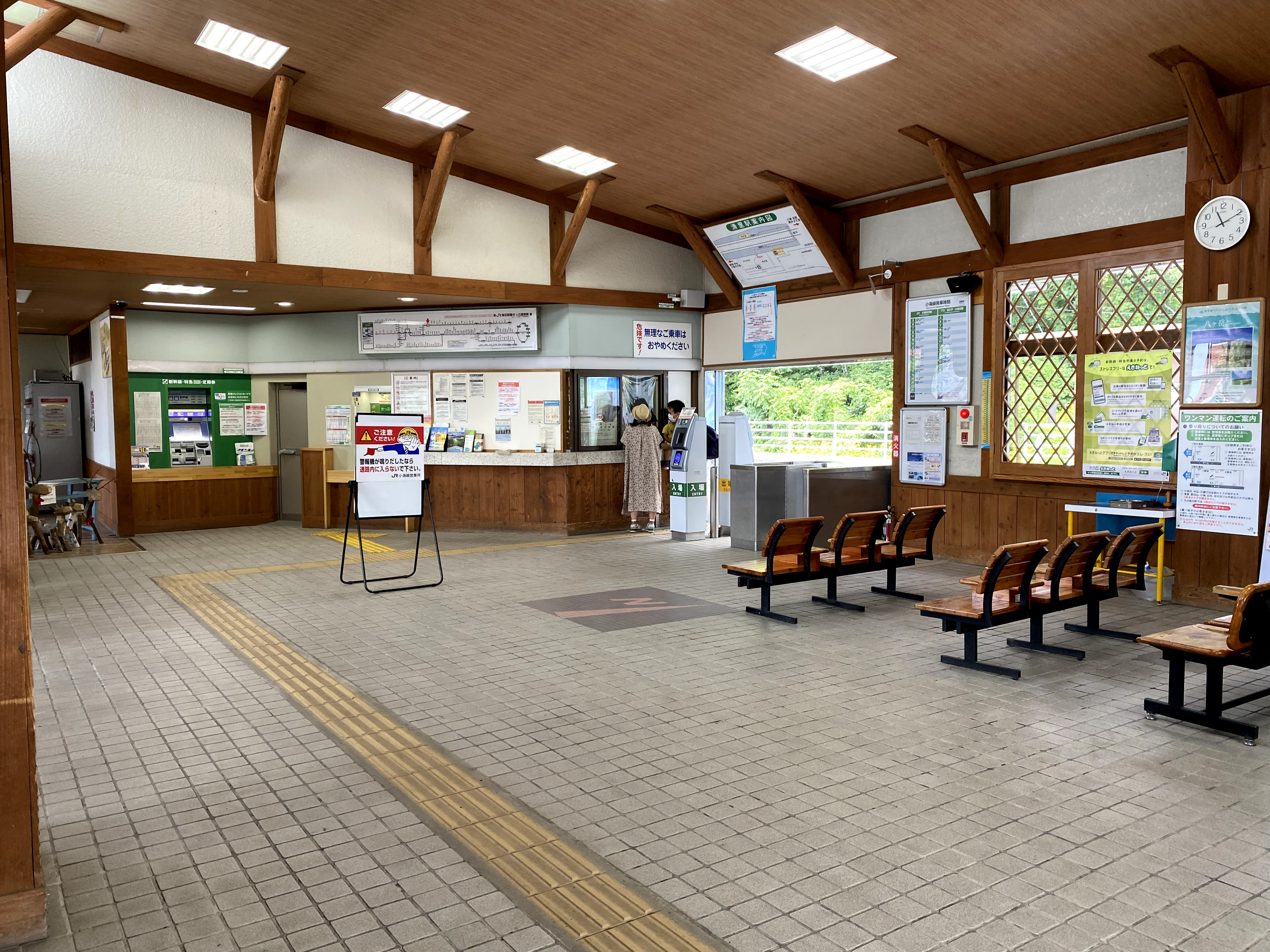
Waiting room, Ticket gates

Kiyosato Station (清里駅, Kiyosato-eki) is a railway station in Kiyosato in the city of Hokuto, Yamanashi Prefecture, Japan. Kiyosato Station serves as the gateway to the surrounding highland resort area as well as the Kiyosato Educational Experiment Program (KEEP), a Summer camp, agricultural training and conference center established in 1938 by American missionary Paul Rusch. With an elevation of 1,274 m (4,180 ft) on the southern slopes of Mount Yatsugatake, Kiyosato Station is the second highest station on the JR East rail network and the station with the highest elevation in Yamanashi Prefecture.

== Lines ==
Kiyosato Station is served by the Koumi Line and is 17.5 kilometers from the terminus of the line at Kobuchizawa Station.

== Station layout ==
The station consists of two ground-level opposed side platforms, connected by a level crossing. The station has a Midori no Madoguchi staffed ticket office.

=== Platforms ===
1	■ Koumi Line	for Kobuchizawa
2	■ Koumi Line	for Koumi and Komoro

== History ==
Kiyosato Station was opened on 27 July 1933 by the Japanese Government Railways. With the privatization of Japanese National Railways (JNR) on 1 April 1987, the station came under the control of JR East.

== Passenger statistics ==
In fiscal 2015, the station was used by an average of 219 passengers daily (boarding passengers only).

== Surrounding area ==
- Kiyosato Modern Art Museum
- Japan National Route 141

== See also ==
- List of railway stations in Japan
