= Akiyama, Yamanashi =

Former village in Yamanashi Prefecture, Japan

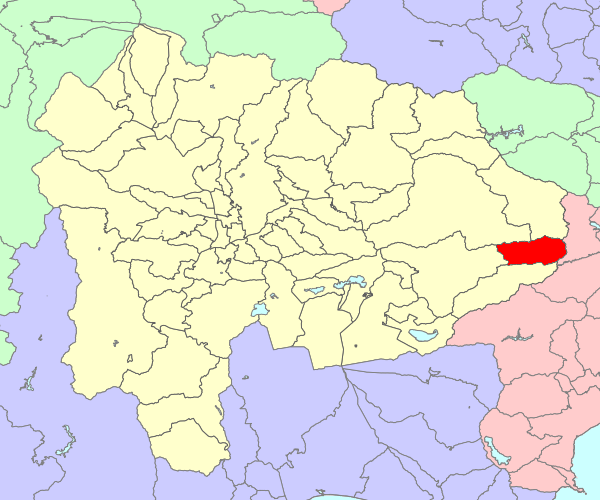
Location Map of former Akiyama Village

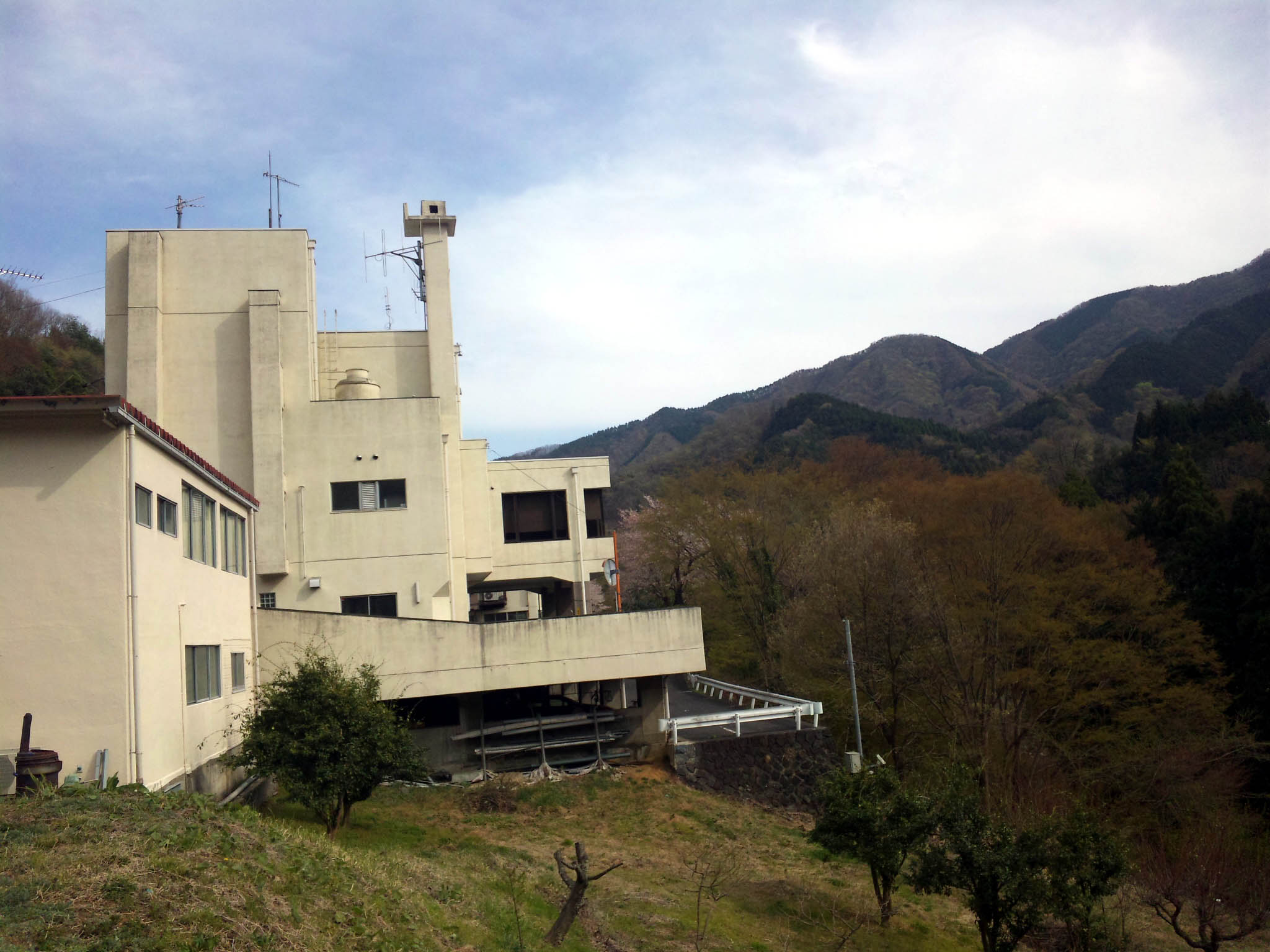
former Akiyama Village Hall

Akiyama (秋山村, Akiyama-mura) was a village located in Minamitsuru District, Yamanashi Prefecture, Japan.

As of 2003, the village had an estimated population of 2,306 and a density of 51.09 persons per km^{2}. The total area was 45.14 km^{2}.

On February 13, 2005, Akiyama was merged with the former town of Uenohara (from Kitatsuru District), to create the city of Uenohara.
