= Minamitsuru District, Yamanashi =

Minamitsuru 南都留郡
- District
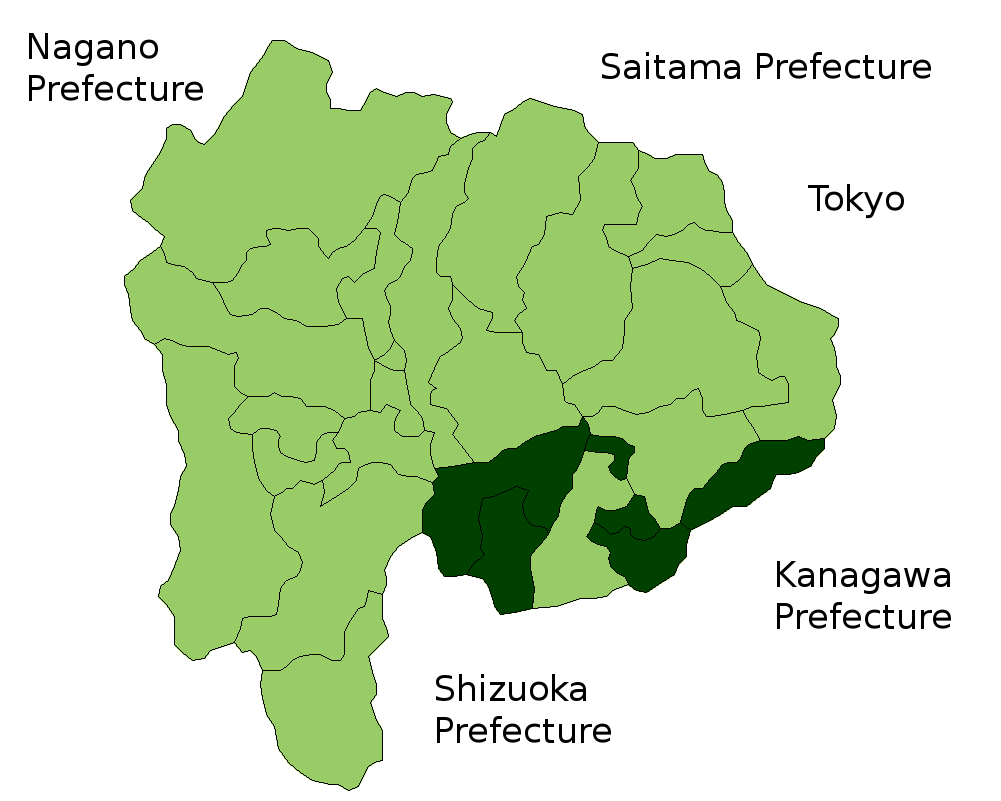
- Location of Minamitsuru in Yamanashi

- Location in Japan
- Coordinates: 35.507°N 138.754°E
- Country: Japan
- Prefecture: Yamanashi
- Established: July 22, 1878

Area
  - Total: 421 km^{2} (163 sq mi)

Population (1 October 2020)
  - Total: 48,970
  - Density: 1,163/km^{2} (3,010/sq mi)
- Time zone: UTC+09:00 (JST)

Minamitsuru (南都留郡, Minamitsuru-gun) is a rural district located in southeastern Yamanashi Prefecture, Japan.

As of 1 October 2020, the district had an estimated population of 48,970 with a density of 116,3 persons per km^{2}. The total area was 421 km^{2}.

== Municipalities ==
The districts consists of two towns and four villages:

- Dōshi (Note: Classified as a village.)
- Fujikawaguchiko (Note: Classified as a town.)
- Narusawa
- Nishikatsura
- Oshino
- Yamanakako

== History ==
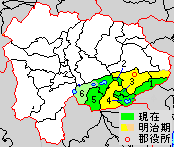
Map showing original extent of Minamitsuru District in Yamanashi Prefecture: * yellow - areas formerly within the district borders during the early Meiji period * green - current borders: 1. Dōshi-mura; 2. Nishikatsura-machi; 3. Oshino-mura; 4. Yamanakako-mura; 5. Narusawa-mura; 6. Fujikawaguchiko-machi

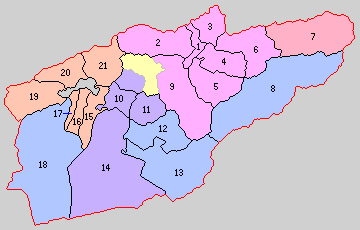
Colored areas are in this district.

The district formerly included the cities of Fujiyoshida, Tsuru and a portion of the city of Uenohara.

=== District Timeline ===
Minamitsuru District was founded during the early Meiji period establishment of the municipalities system on July 22, 1878 and initially consisted of 21 villages.

=== Recent mergers ===
- On November 15, 2003 - The town of Kawaguchiko, and the villages of Katsuyama and Ashiwada were merged to form the town of Fujikawaguchiko
- On February 13, 2005 - The village of Akiyama was merged with the former town of Uenohara (from Kitatsuru District) to form the new city of Uenohara.
- On March 1, 2006 - The town of Fujikawaguchiko absorbed parts of the village of Kamikuishiki (from Nishiyatsushiro District), consisting of the sections of Fujigane, Motosu and Shoji.
