= Shibireko Prefectural Natural Park =

Natural park in Yamanashi Prefecture, Japan

Coordinates: 35°31′46″N 138°31′2″E

- 県立四尾連湖自然公園
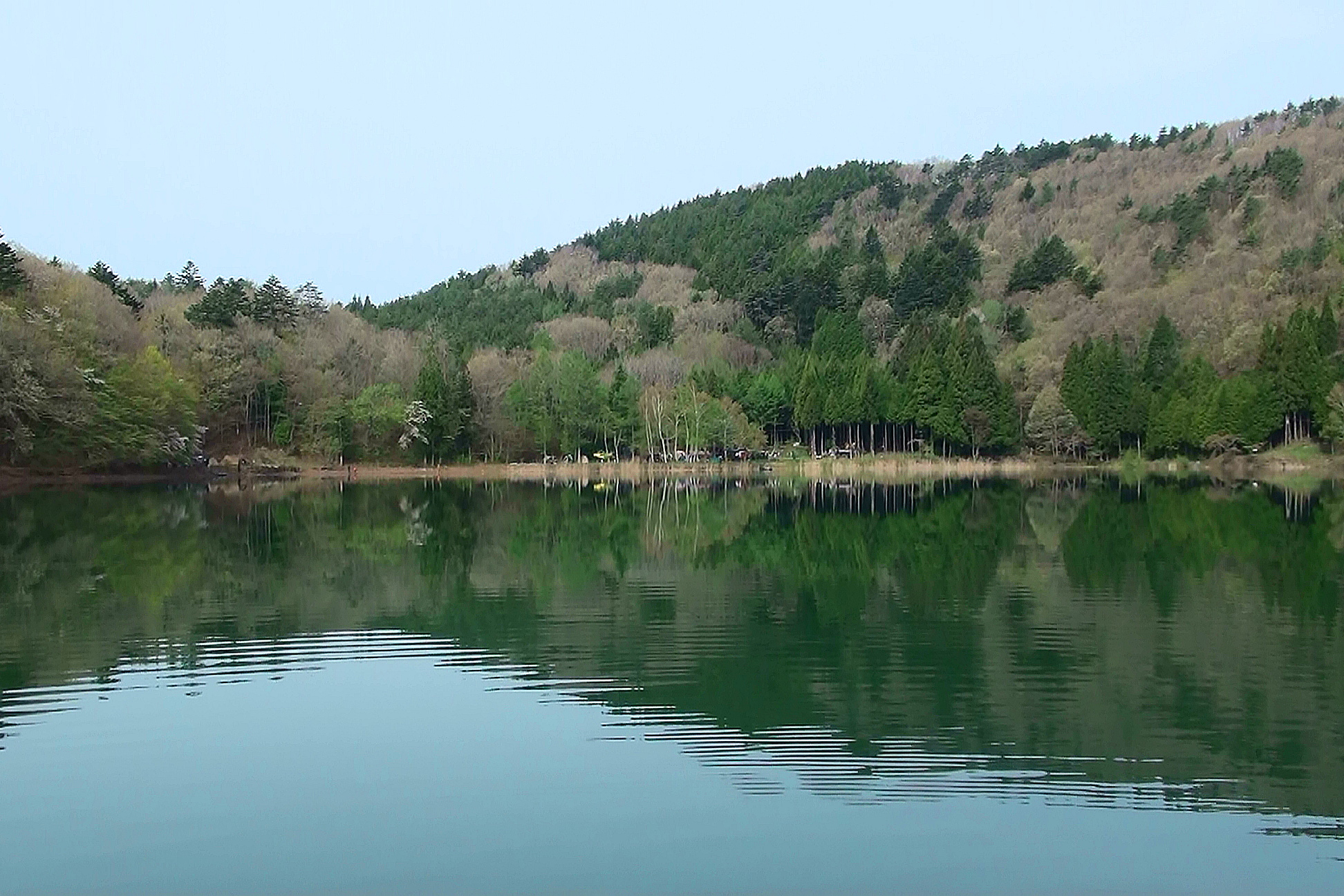
- Lake Shibire
- Interactive map of Shibireko Prefectural Natural Park
- Location: Yamanashi Prefecture, Japan
- Area: 3.62 km^{2} (1.40 sq mi)
- Established: 2 April 1959

Shibireko Prefectural Natural Park (県立四尾連湖自然公園, Kenritsu Shibireko shizen kōen) is a Prefectural Natural Park in Yamanashi Prefecture, Japan. Established in 1959, the park's central feature is Lake Shibire (四尾連湖). The park is wholly within the municipality of Ichikawamisato.

== See also ==
- National Parks of Japan
