= Kitatsuru District, Yamanashi =

Kitatsuru 北都留郡
- District
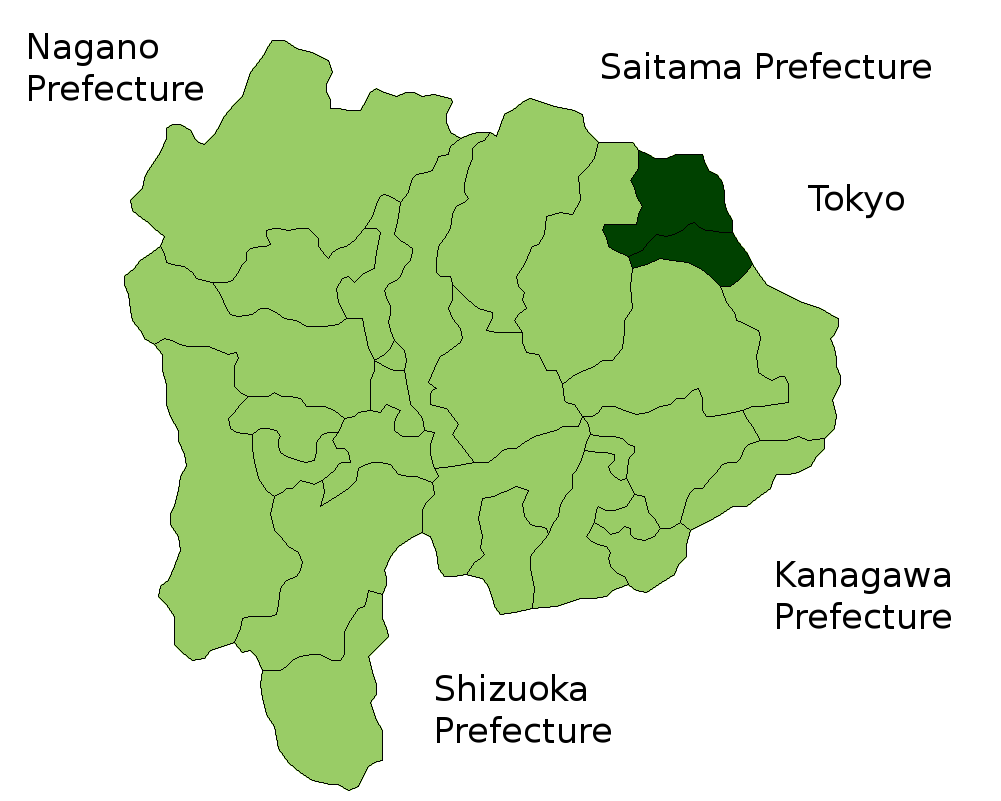
- Location of Kitatsuru in Yamanashi

- Location in Japan
- Coordinates: 35.794°N 138.908°E
- Country: Japan
- Prefecture: Yamanashi
- Established: July 22, 1878

Area
  - Total: 154.2 km^{2} (59.5 sq mi)

Population (October 2020)
  - Total: 1,214
  - Density: 7.87/km^{2} (20.4/sq mi)
- Time zone: UTC+09:00 (JST)

Kitatsuru (北都留郡, Kitatsuru-gun) is a rural district located in northeastern Yamanashi Prefecture, Japan.

As of October 2020, the district had an estimated population of 1,214 with a density of 7.879 persons per km^{2}. The total area was 154.1 km^{2}.

== Municipalities ==
Prior to its dissolution, the district consisted of only two villages:

- Kosuge (Note: Classified as a village.)
- Tabayama

== History ==
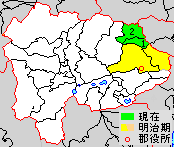
Map showing original extent of Kitatsuru District in Yamanashi Prefecture: * yellow - areas formerly within the district borders during the early Meiji period * green - current borders: 1. Kosuge-mura; 2. Tabayam-mura

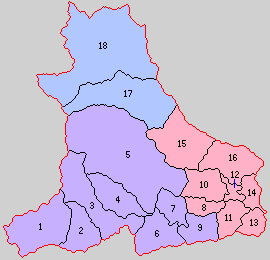
Colored areas are in this district.

The district formerly included the city of Ōtsuki and a portion of the city of Uenohara.

=== District Timeline ===
Kitatsuru District was founded during the early Meiji period establishment of the municipalities system on July 22, 1878 and initially consisted of 18 villages.

Uenohara was elevated to town status on December 27, 1897, followed by Ōtsuki on April 1, 1933. Saruhashi became a town on April 1, 1935, followed by Shippo on April 1, 1954. However, on August 8, 1954, Shippo and Saruhashi merged with Ōtsuki to form the city of Ōtsuki.

=== Recent mergers ===
- On February 13, 2005 - The former town of Uenohara absorbed the village of Akiyama (from Minamitsuru District) to form the new city of Uenohara.
