= Teikyo University of Science =

Private university in Yamanashi, Japan

Coordinates: 35°45′12.7″N 139°47′21.4″E

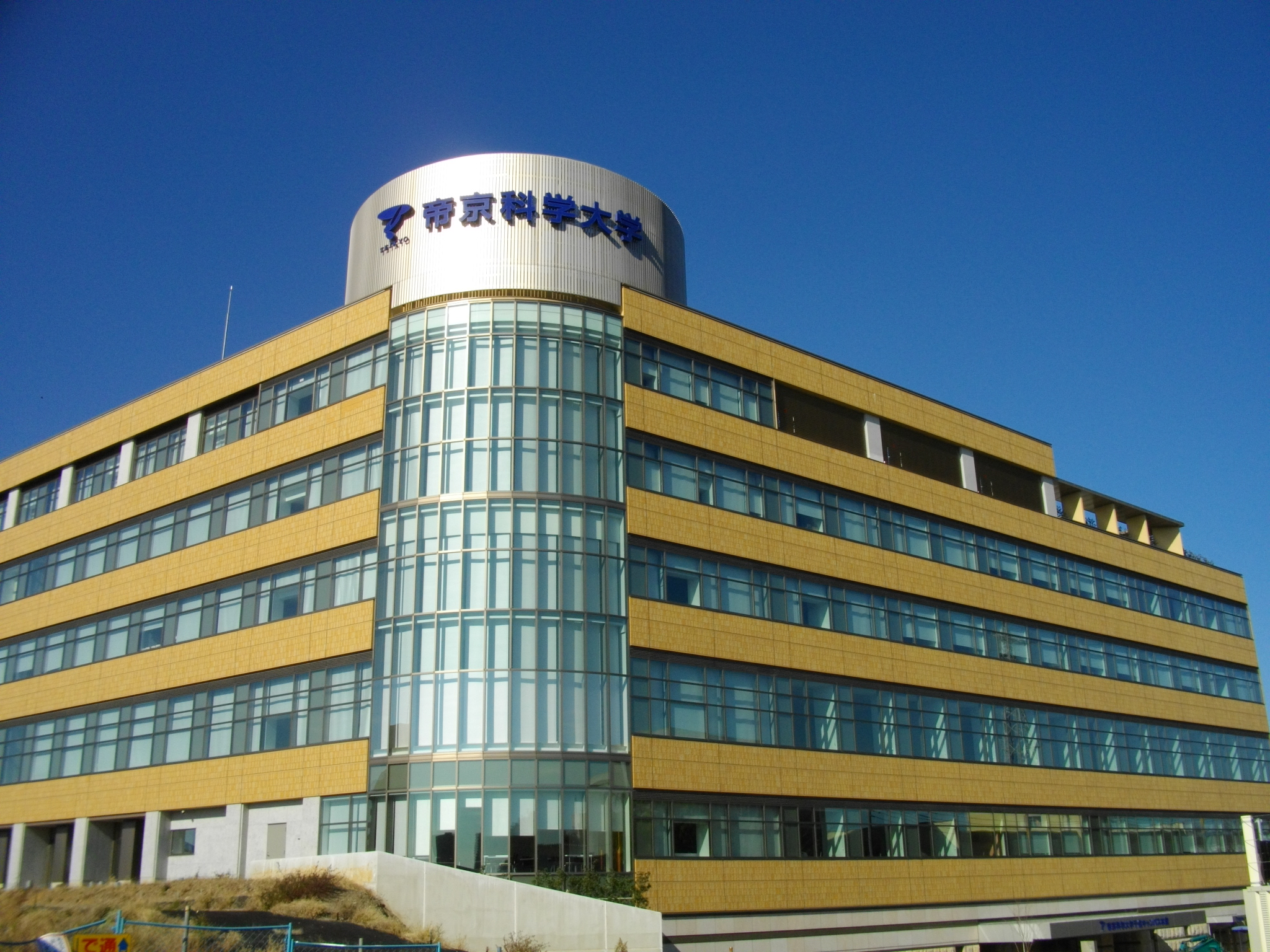
Teikyo University of Science Senju Campus

Teikyo University of Science (帝京科学大学, Teikyō kagaku daigaku) is a private university in Uenohara, Yamanashi, Japan. It was established in 1990 as the Nishi Tokyo University of Science and renamed Teikyo University of Science in April 1996.
