= Senga Falls =

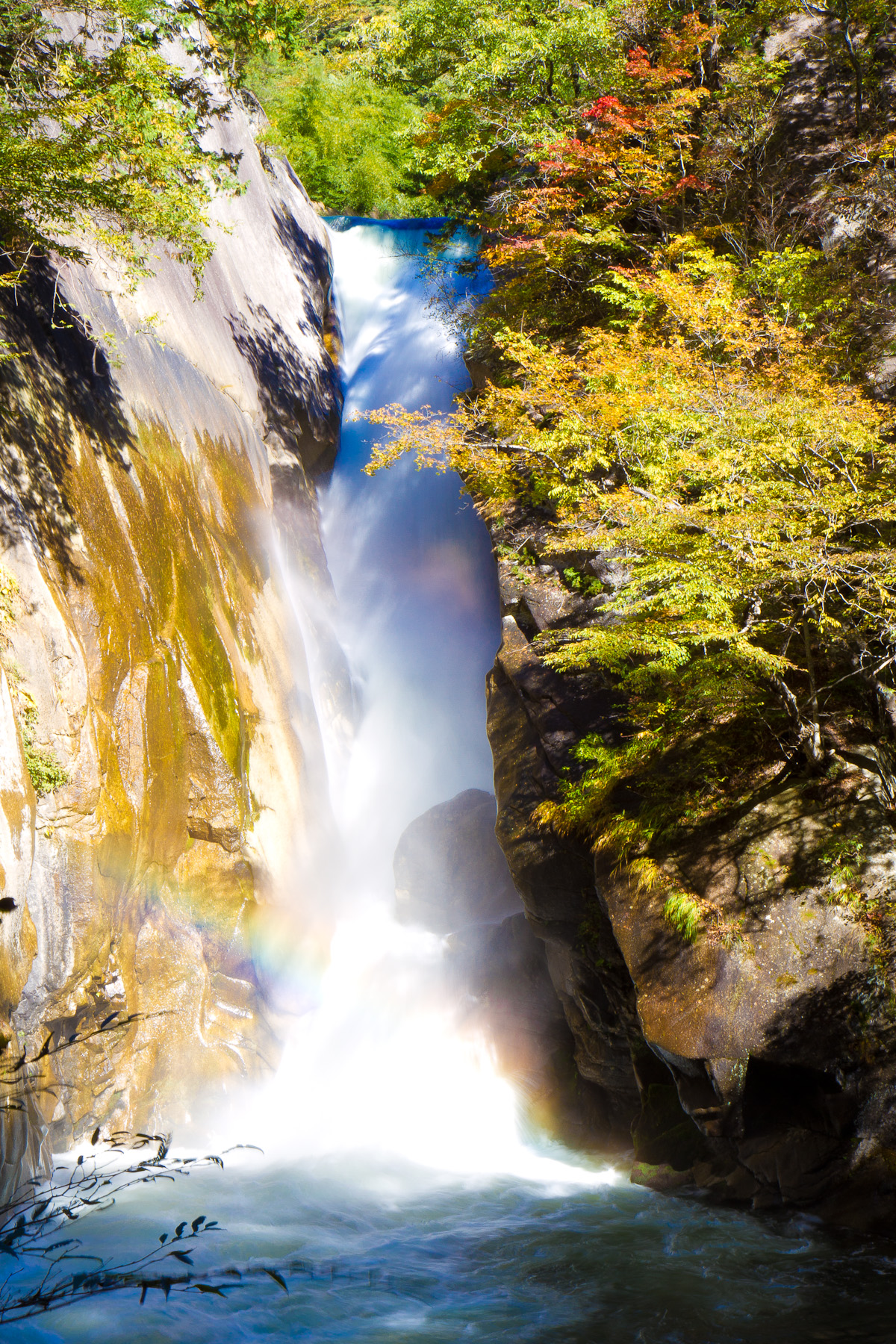
- Senga Falls

- Location within Japan
- Location: Kōfu, Yamanashi Prefecture, Japan
- Coordinates: 35°44′58.23″N 138°33′58.26″E
- Type: chute
- Total height: 30 metres (98 ft)
- Watercourse: Arakawa River/Fuji River

Senga Falls (仙娥滝, Senga-taki) is a waterfall in northern Kōfu, Yamanashi Prefecture, Japan, on the Arakawa River, an upper tributary of the Fuji River. It is located in the Shōsenkyō canyon, which is recognized by the national government as one of the protected Special Places of Scenic Beauty.

The Senga Falls is listed as one of the "Japan’s Top 100 Waterfalls", in a listing published by the Japanese Ministry of the Environment in 1990. Located within a 5-minute walk from a parking lot, a large number of tourists visit during the autumn foliage season.
