= Paul Rusch =

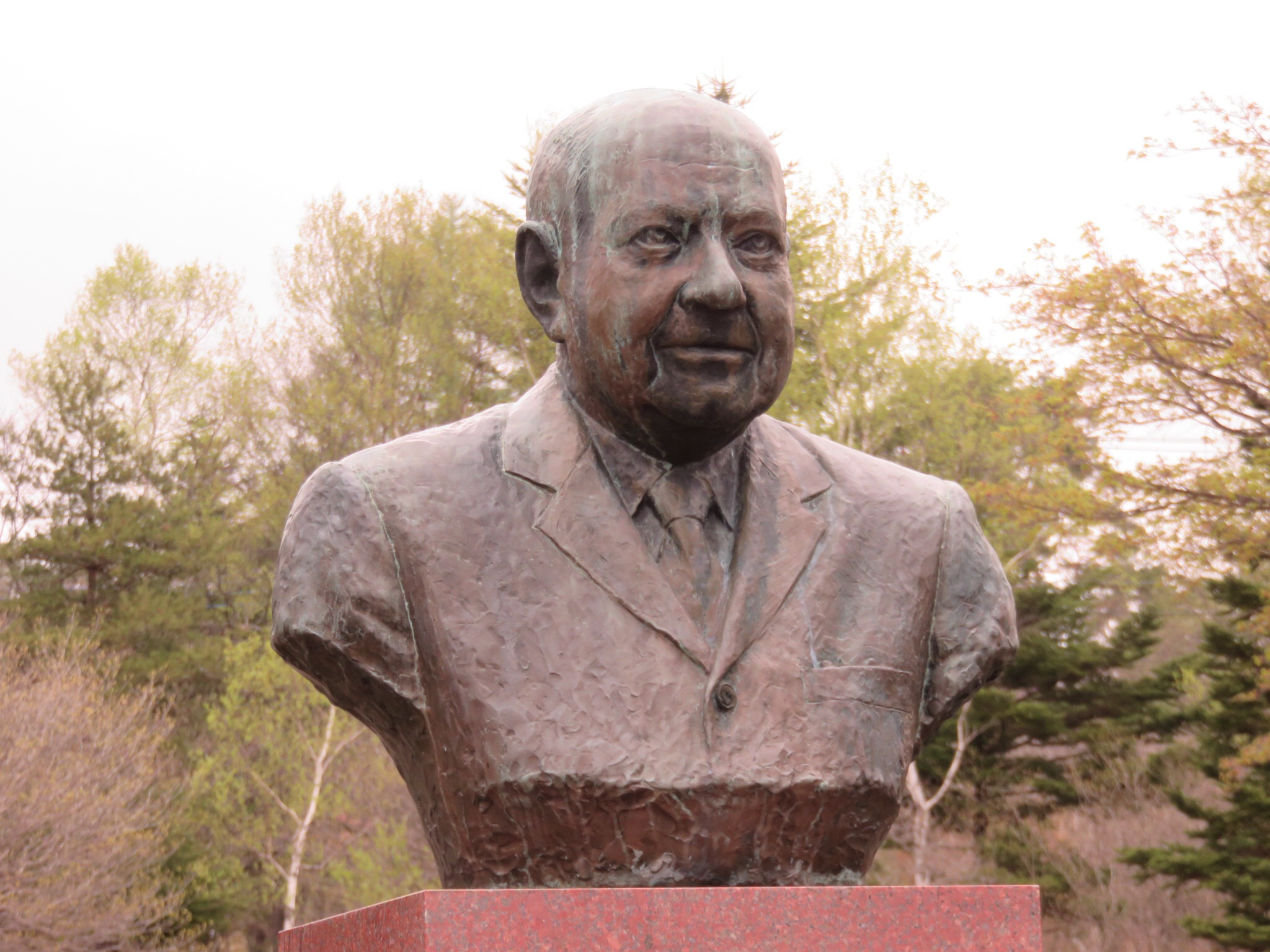
- Paul Rusch Memorial, Kiyosato, Yamanashi
- Born: November 25, 1897; Fairmount, Indiana
- Died: December 12, 1979 (aged 82); Tokyo, Japan
- Occupations: Anglican lay missionary, educator, rural development pioneer, post war reconciliation activist.

Paul Frederick Rusch (1897 – 1979) was a lay missionary of the Anglican Church in Japan.

Rusch is remembered in Japan for his role as an educator and for pioneering activities in development of American football, rural agriculture and post Second World War reconciliation.

== Background and early life ==
Born November 25, 1897, in Fairmount, Indiana, US, Rusch was raised in Louisville, Kentucky. He served with the US Army in France during the First World War. In Kentucky, Rusch was an active member of the congregation of Christ Church Cathedral in Louisville.

== Work in Japan ==
Rusch first arrived in Japan in 1925, initially to help the YMCA with reconstruction efforts after the Great Kantō earthquake, and stayed to dedicate his life and energies towards youth education, post-war reconciliation and rural development in that country. Through his association with the Anglican Church in Japan he taught both Economics at Rikkyo University and was instrumental in helping Dr. Rudolf Teusler raise funds for the expansion of St. Luke's International Hospital in central Tokyo.

Encouraged by Bishop Charles S. Reifsnider, Rusch was renowned as an unconventional, but highly effective lay evangelist for the Anglican Church in Japan, establishing a chapter of the Brotherhood of St. Andrew at Rikkyo University in 1927.

In 1934 Rusch also established and was elected first chairman of the Intercollegiate Football League, the first college level American Football association in Japan. The Paul Rusch Cup is awarded each year to the MVP of the Rice Bowl, Japan's own American Football national championship game.

Rusch was arrested in December 1941 immediately after the Japanese Attack on Pearl Harbor. He was detained at a temporary prison camp on the campus of Sumire Girls' School on the outskirts of Tokyo and eventually deported from Japan as a part of a wartime prisoner exchange in June 1942. Repatriated back to the United States, Rusch worked at the Military Intelligence Service Language School at Camp Savage, Minnesota, returning to Japan at the end of hostilities as a member of General Douglas MacArthur's General Staff.

== Kiyosato Educational Experiment Project (KEEP) ==
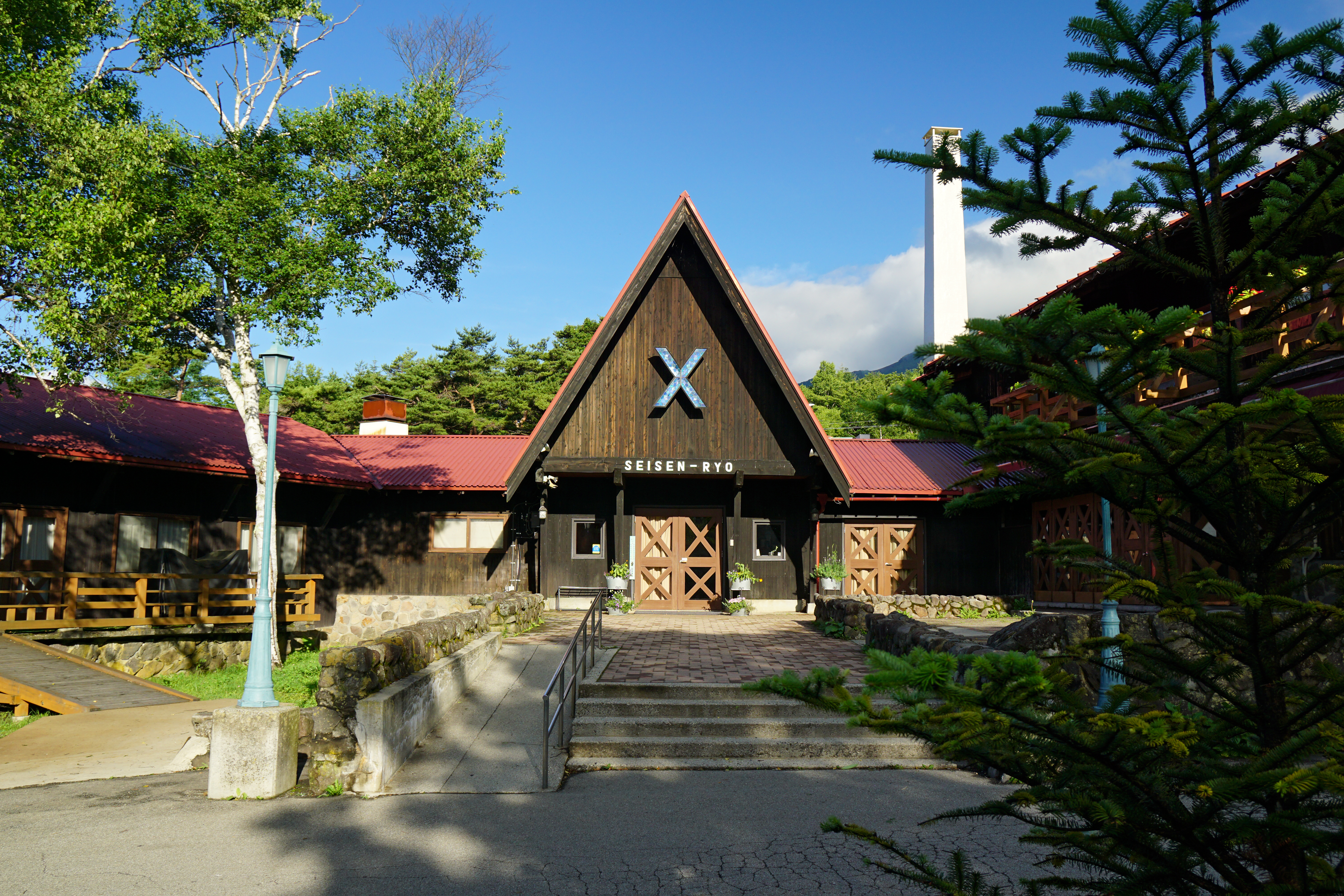
KEEP Seisen Ryo, Main Building

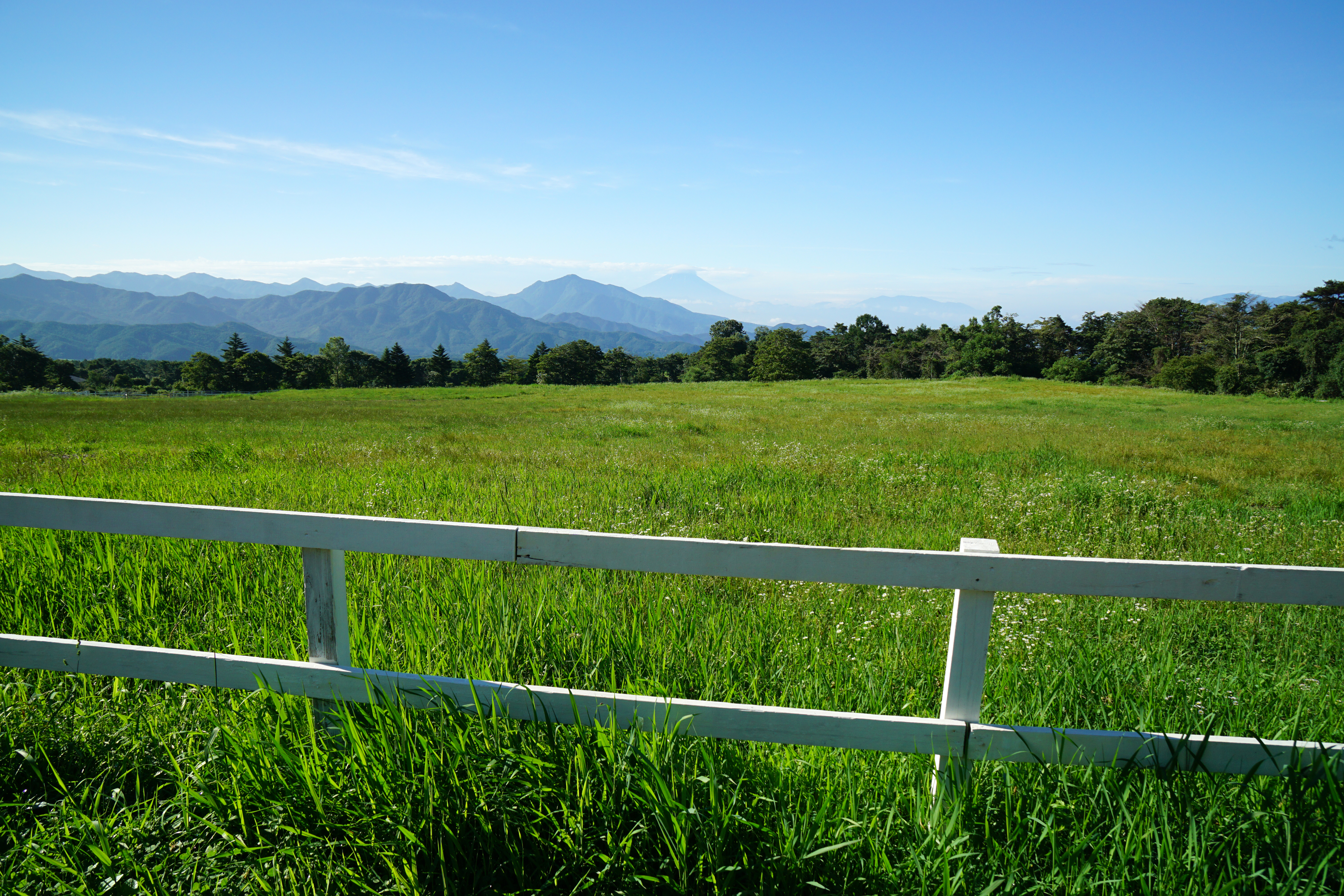
KEEP Farm, Kiyosato

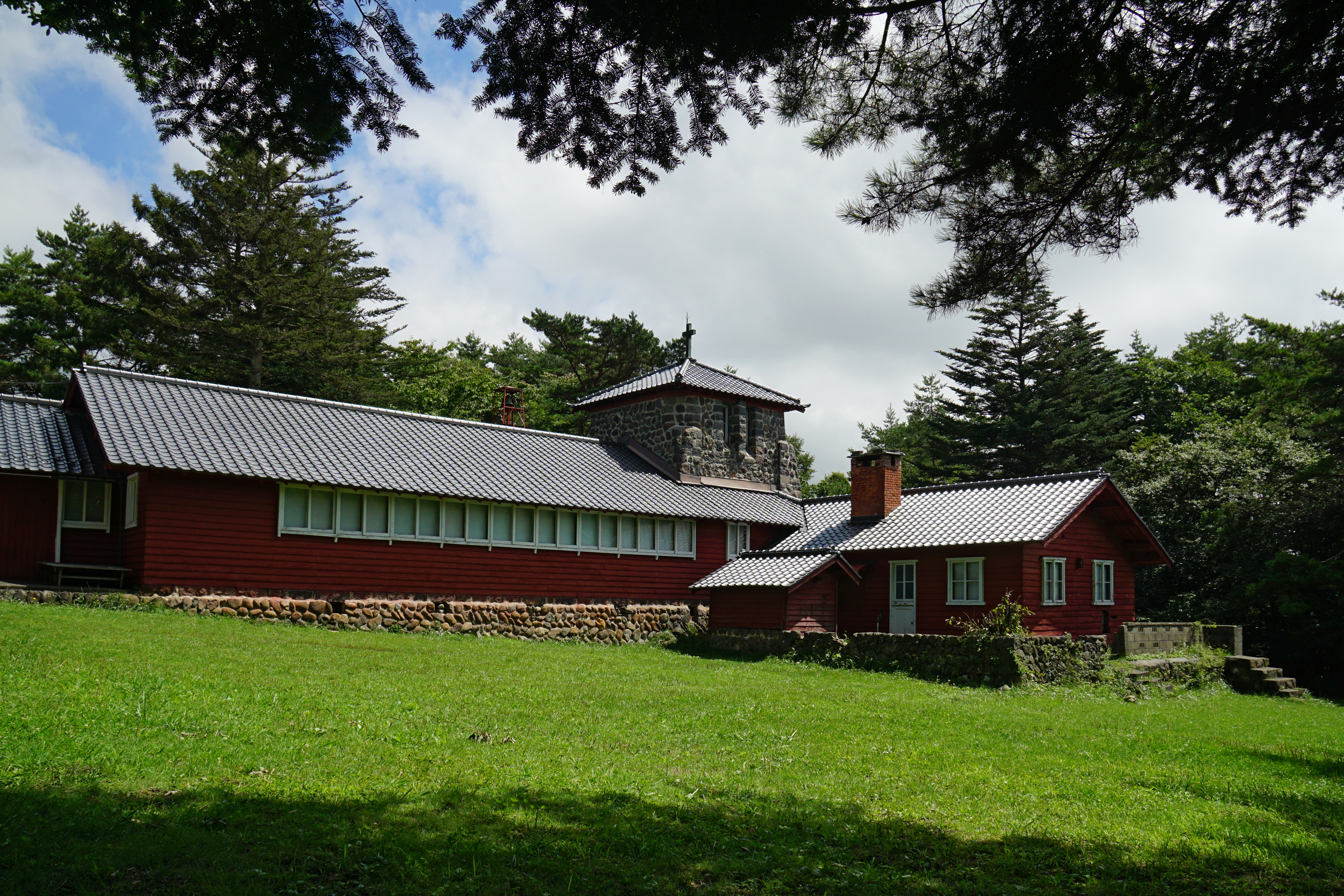
St. Andrew's Church, Kiyosato

Rusch is most widely known for his work in founding the rural Camp Seisen Ryo (清泉寮, Seisen Ryo) at Kiyosato, on the slopes of Mt. Yatsugatake, Yamanashi Prefecture. The camp and farm, first opened in July 1938, served as an Anglican youth mission center prior to the Second World War and was rededicated in 1946 as the Kiyosato Educational Experiment Project (KEEP).

After the war, as surrounding fields were cleared, a new Anglican church dedicated to St. Andrew was constructed using local stone. A vocational school, an experimental farm, a nursery and library facilities soon followed. In June 1948 the groundbreaking ceremonies for the Seisen Ryo rural clinic were attended by Prince Takamatsu. Other features of the mountainside site include a Yamanashi Prefecture Nature Center, the Japan American Football Hall of Fame, and an outdoor chapel and altar constructed in 1962 by students from Lenox School for Boys.

The KEEP farm and mission center is an operationally independent year-round residential retreat and conference center, but retains its links with Anglican and other Christian church educational establishments throughout Japan.

The original farm property and Paul Rusch Memorial Museum are the focus of the popular Yatsugatake County Fair and Paul Rusch Festival held each October.

== Recognition and awards ==
Among numerous awards and decorations, Rusch received honorary doctorates from Hobart and William Smith College in 1950, Lincoln University in 1955 and Rikkyo University in 1965.

Rusch was awarded the Third Order of the Sacred Treasure by the Japanese Government in 1956.

The Paul Rusch Athletics Center on the main campus of Rikkyo University in Ikebukuro is named in his honour. A commemorative plaque in the University Chapel records his role as Godfather of over 500 Rikkyo Students.

== Paul Rusch Cup ==
The Paul Rusch Cup is an annual award, beginning in 1984, given to the top American football player in Japan.

== See also ==
- Anglican Church in Japan
- Rikkyo University
