= Kiyosato, Yamanashi =

Kiyosato 清里
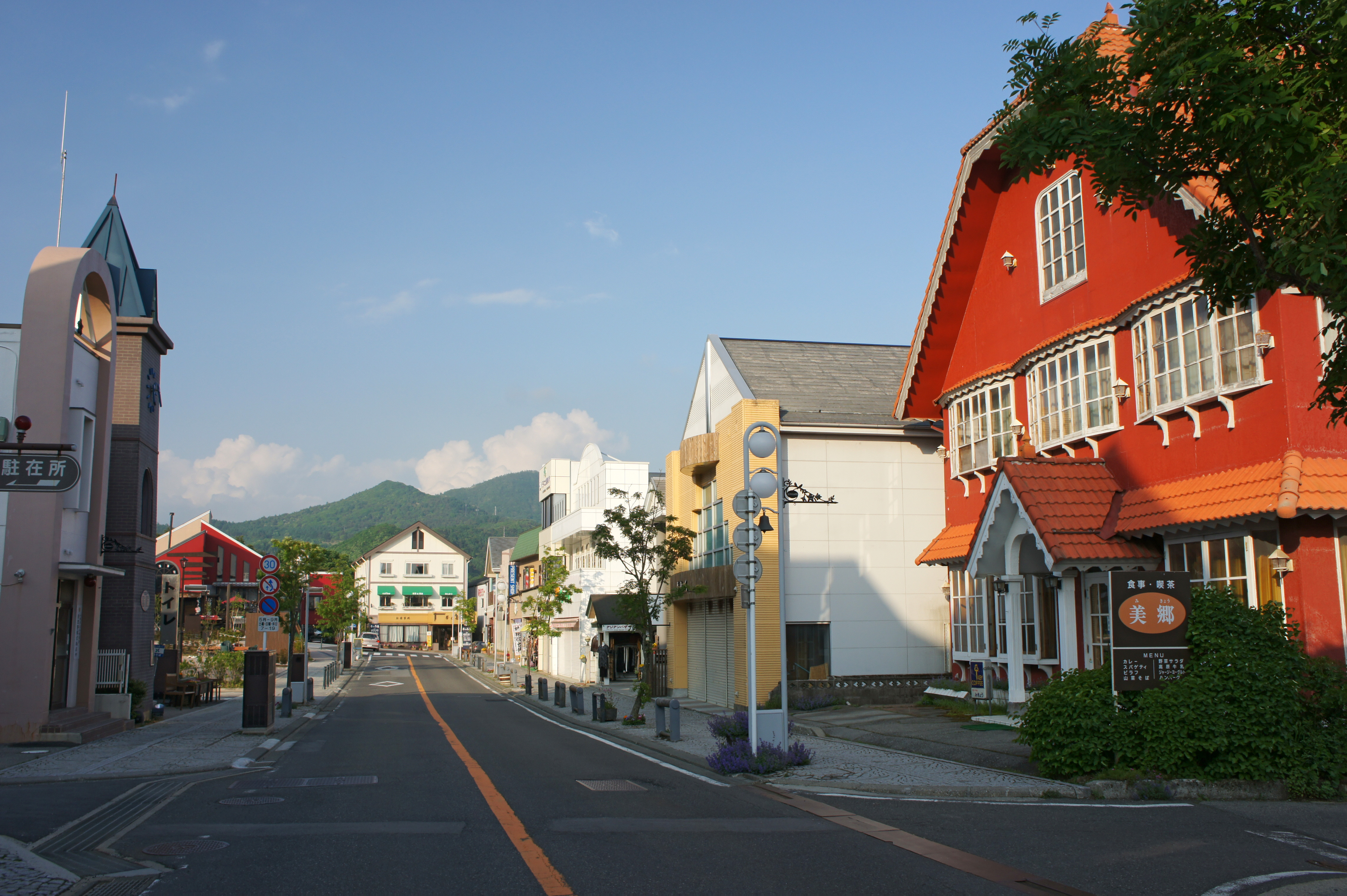
- The Main Street of Kiyosato.
- Interactive map of Kiyosato
- Coordinates: 35°55′5″N 138°26′6″E
- Country: Japan
- Prefecture: Yamanashi
- City: Hokuto

Kiyosato (清里, Kiyosato) is a locality in the city of Hokuto, Yamanashi, Japan. At over 1,200m in elevation with views south towards Mount Fuji, it is a popular highland resort area and location for second homes. After the opening of the Koumi Line in 1933, Kiyosato rose to prominence as a resort center and as the home of Camp Seisen Ryo, an Anglican youth mission center prior to the Second World War, rededicated in 1946 as the Kiyosato Educational Experiment Project (KEEP).

== Geography ==
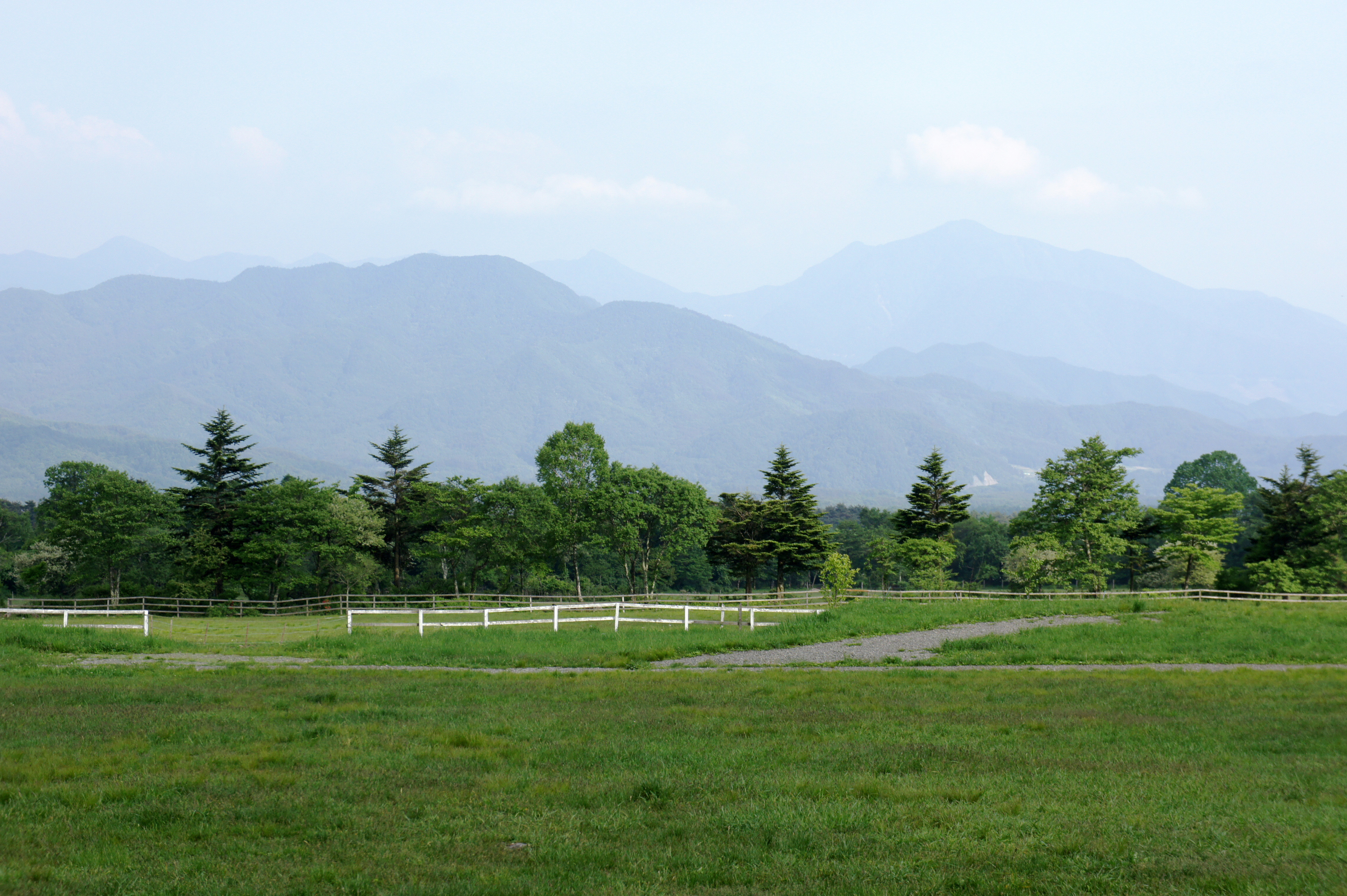
The KEEP Farm, Kiyosato Yamanashi Prefecture

The KEEP farm with its focus on dairy farming, initially served as a local community and agricultural development center. Herds of Jersey cows are still a feature of the area, but KEEP is now better known as a year-round resort and conference center and as the home of the Paul Rusch Memorial Museum and the Japan, American Football Hall of Fame.

The original farm property is the focus of the popular Yatsugatake County Fair and Paul Rusch Festival held each October.

== Transportation ==
It is serviced by Kiyosato Station on the Koumi Line.

== See also ==
- Kiyosato Educational Experiment Project (KEEP)
- Kiyosato Museum of Photographic Arts
