= Uenohara =

Uenohara 上野原市
- City
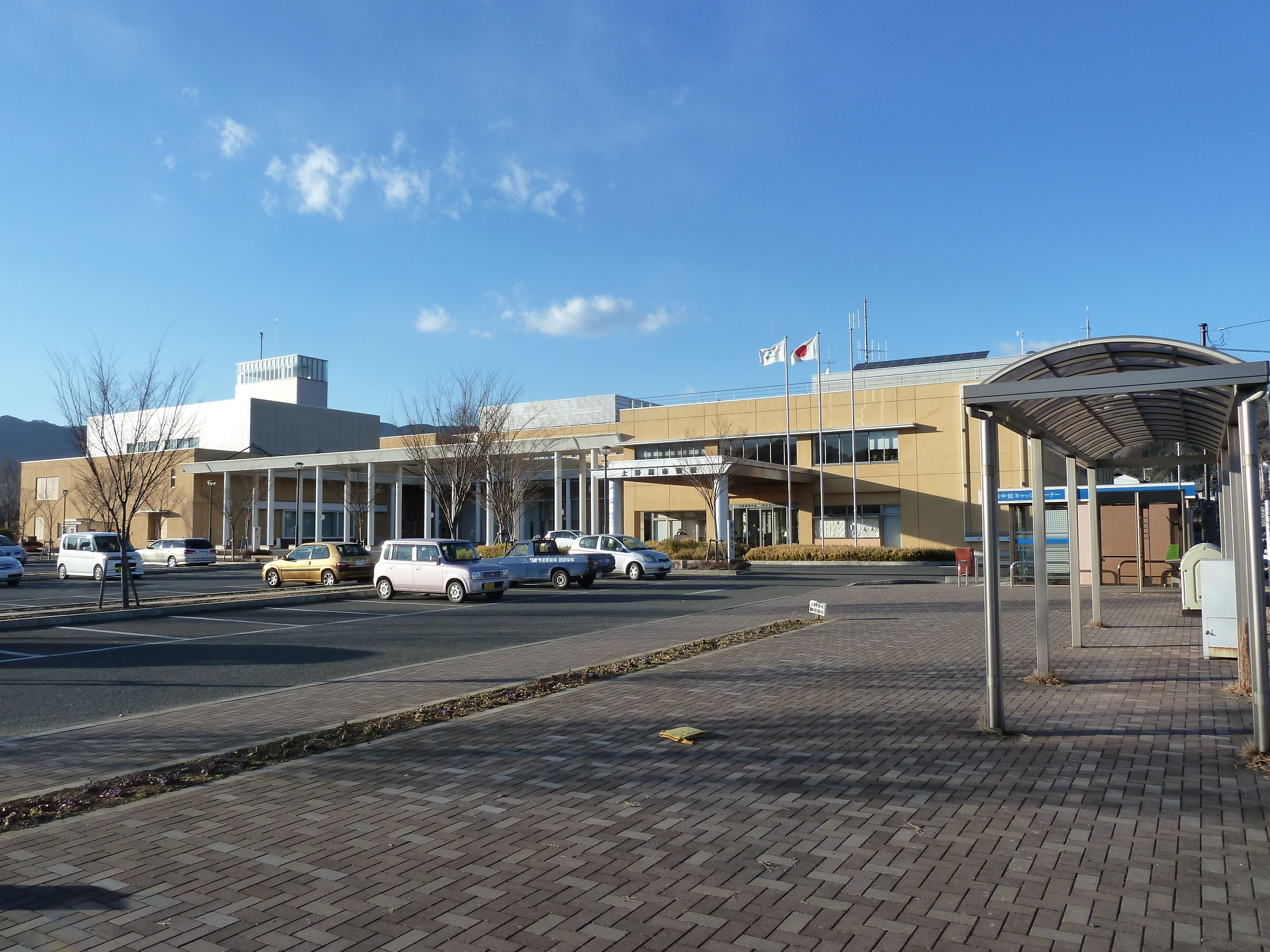
- Uenohara City Hall

- Flag Seal

- Location of Uenohara in Yamanashi Prefecture

- Coordinates: 35°37′48.7″N 139°06′40.8″E
- Country: Japan
- Region: Chūbu (Tōkai)
- Prefecture: Yamanashi
- Town settled: December 27, 1897
- City settled: February 13, 2005

Government
  - Mayor: Nobuyuki Murakami (since March 2021)

Area
  - Total: 170.57 km^{2} (65.86 sq mi)

Population (July 1, 2019)
  - Total: 23,158
  - Density: 135.77/km^{2} (351.64/sq mi)
- Time zone: UTC+9 (Japan Standard Time)
- Tree: Japanese maple
- Flower: Gentiana scabra
- Bird: Cettia diphone
- Phone number: 0554-62-3111
- Address: Uenohara 3832, Uenohara City, Yamanashi 409-0192
- Website: Official website

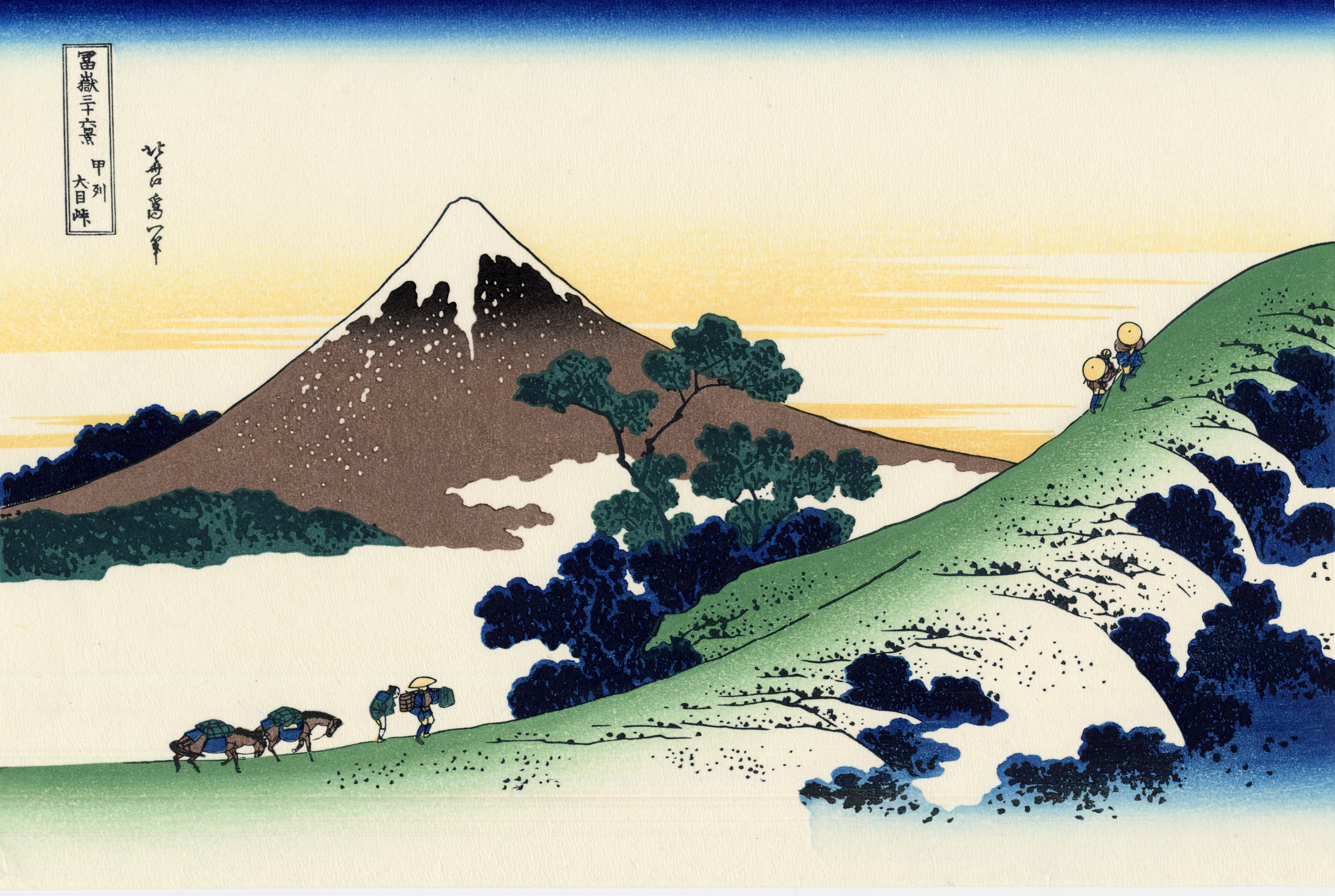
Hokusai

Uenohara (上野原市, Uenohara-shi; Japanese pronunciation: [ɯ̈̀.é̞.nó̞.hä̀.ɾä̀, -hä́.ɾä́.ɕì]) is a city located in Yamanashi Prefecture, Japan. As of 1 February 2023, the city had an estimated population of 23,158 in 9987 households, and a population density of 140 persons per km². The total area of the city is 170.57 square kilometres (65.86 sq mi).

== Geography ==
Uenohara is located on the extreme eastern edge of Yamanashi Prefecture, on a fluvial terrace of the Sagami River.

- Mountains: Mount Mikuni, Mount Mitou, Mount Ougi
- Rivers: Sagami River, Tsuru River, Nakama River

=== Surrounding municipalities ===
- Kanagawa Prefecture
  - Sagamihara
- Tokyo
  - Okutama, Hinohara
- Yamanashi Prefecture
  - Dōshi
  - Kosuge
  - Ōtsuki
  - Tsuru

=== Climate ===
The climate in the city is characterized by hot, humid summers and relatively mild winters (Köppen climate classification Cfa). The average annual temperature in Uenohara is 13.4 °C. The average annual rainfall is 1497 mm, with September being the wettest month. The highest temperatures are typically in August, averaging around 25.5 °C, and the lowest in January, averaging around 2.2 °C.

== Demographics ==
Per Japanese census data, Uenohara's population peaked around the year 2000 and has been declining since.

Historical population
Year	Pop.	±%
1940	24,349	—
1950	30,909	+26.9%
1960	28,992	−6.2%
1970	28,317	−2.3%
1980	27,878	−1.6%
1990	27,790	−0.3%
2000	30,157	+8.5%
2010	27,114	−10.1%
2020	22,669	−16.4%

== History ==
The area around present-day Uenohara was heavily settled during the Jōmon period, and numerous Jōmon sites have been found within the city limits. However, there are fewer Yayoi period sites. During the Nara period ritsuryo organization of Kai Province, the area came under Tsuru County. From the middle of the Kamakura period, much of the province came under the control of the Takeda clan, although as a border area adjacent to the holdings of the Uesugi clan and the Odawara Hōjō clan, it was the location of many skirmishes and battles. During the Edo period, all of Kai Province was tenryō territory under the direct control of the Tokugawa shogunate. During this period, the Kōshū Kaidō, one of the Edo Five Routes, passed through Uenohara, which had four of the 45 post stations on that route. The area was also a noted center for sericulture.

After the Meiji restoration, the village of Uenohara was established on December 27, 1897, with the creation of the modern municipalities system. Uenohara became a town on April 1, 1955, by annexing seven neighboring villages. The modern city of Uenohara was established on February 13, 2005, by the mergers of the former town of Uenohara (from Kitatsuru District), absorbing the village of Akiyama (from Minamitsuru District).

== Government ==
Uenohara has a mayor-council form of government with a directly elected mayor and a unicameral city legislature of 16 members.

== Economy ==
The economy of Uenohara is dominated by agriculture, sericulture and textile manufacturing.

== Education ==
Uenohara has five public elementary schools and three public junior high schools operated by the city government and one public high school operated by the Yamanashi Prefectural Board of Education. There is also one private high school. The city also hosts the private Teikyo University of Science.

- Universities
  - Teikyo University of Science
- High Schools
  - Japan University Meisei High School
  - Uenohara High School
- Middle schools
  - Akiyama Middle School
  - Nishi Middle School
  - Uenohara Middle School
- Primary Schools
  - Akiyama Elementary School
  - Nishi Elementary School
  - Saihara Elementary School
  - Shimada Elementary School
  - Uenohara Elementary School

== Transportation ==
=== Railway ===
- East Japan Railway Company - Chūō Main Line
  - Uenohara – Shiotsu

=== Highway ===
- Chūō Expressway
- National Route 20
- Kōshū Kaidō

== Local attractions ==
- Mushono-Dainembutsu dance (National Important Intangible Folk Cultural Property)

== Notable people ==
- Ken Mizorogi, actor
