= Yamanashi Prefecture =

Prefecture of Japan

Coordinates: 35°37′N 138°37′E

Yamanashi Prefecture 山梨県
- Prefecture

Japanese transcription(s)
  - Japanese: 山梨県
  - Rōmaji: Yamanashi-ken
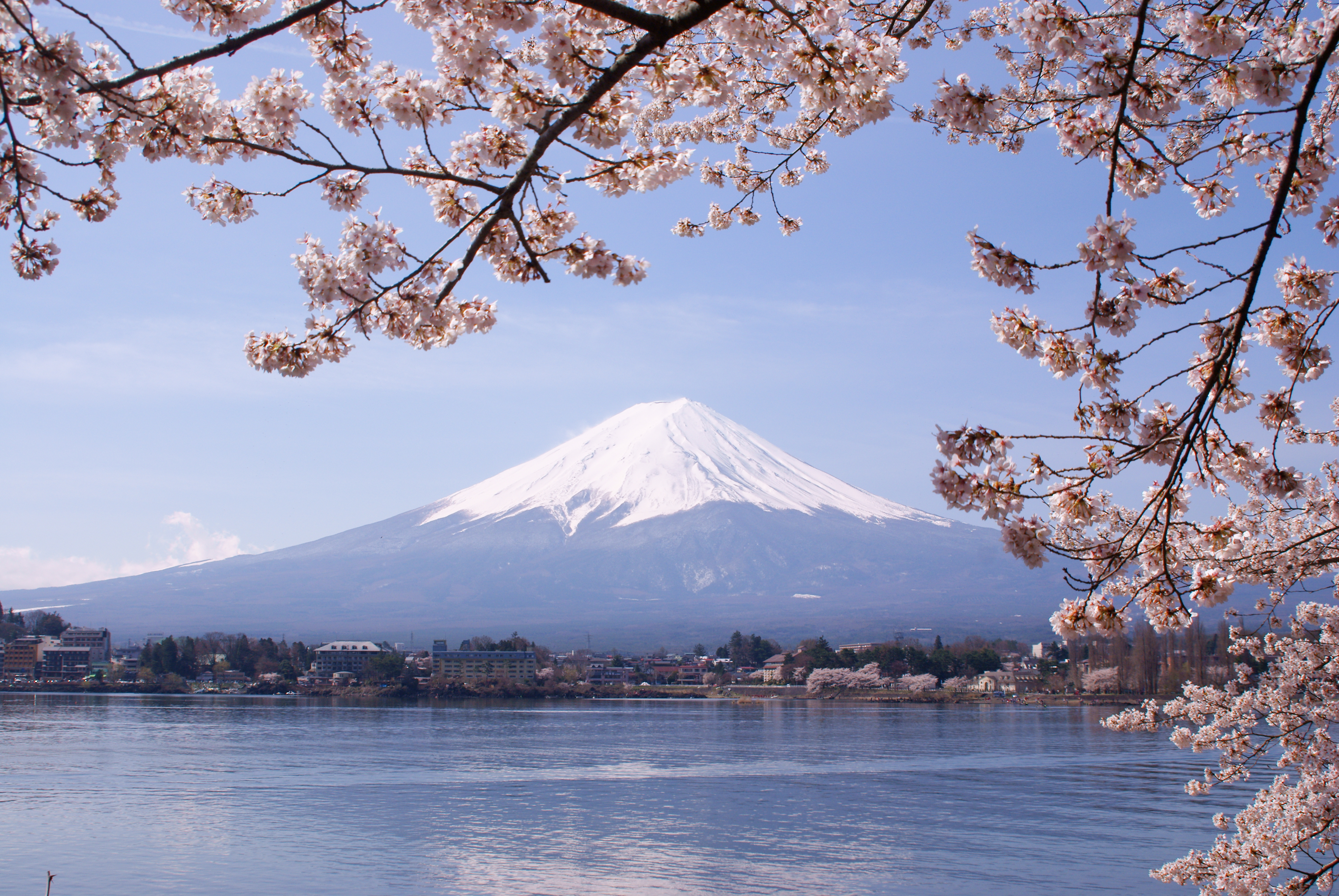
- Lake Kawaguchi, one of the Fuji Five Lakes in Yamanashi Prefecture, at the foot of Mount Fuji

- Flag Symbol
- Anthem: Yamanashi-ken no uta
- Country: Japan
- Region: Chūbu (Kōshin'etsu) (Tōkai)
- Island: Honshu
- Capital: Kōfu
- Subdivisions: Districts: 5, Municipalities: 27

Government
  - Governor: Kotaro Nagasaki (from February 2019)

Area
  - Total: 4,465.27 km^{2} (1,724.05 sq mi)
  - Rank: 32nd
- Highest elevation (Mount Fuji): 3,778 m (12,395 ft)

Population (February 1, 2025)
  - Total: 787,592
  - Rank: 41st
  - Density: 176/km^{2} (460/sq mi)
  - Dialects: Gun'nai・Koshu・Narada

GDP
  - Total: JP¥ 3,715 billion US$ 27.4 billion (2022)
- ISO 3166 code: JP-19
- Website: www.pref.yamanashi.jp
- Symbols of Japan
- Bird: Uguisu (bush warbler)
- Flower: Fujizakura (Fuji cherry)
- Tree: Kaede (Japanese maple)

Yamanashi Prefecture (山梨県, Yamanashi-ken (Note: Japanese pronunciation: [jä̀.mä́.nä̀.ɕì, -nä́.ɕi̥.kè̞ɴ̀])) is a prefecture of Japan located in the Chūbu region of Honshu. Yamanashi Prefecture has a population of 787,592 (1 February 2025) and has a geographic area of 4,465 km^{2} (1,724 sq mi). Yamanashi Prefecture borders Saitama Prefecture to the northeast, Nagano Prefecture to the northwest, Shizuoka Prefecture to the southwest, Kanagawa Prefecture to the southeast, and Tokyo to the east.

Kōfu is the capital and largest city of Yamanashi Prefecture, with other major cities including Kai, Minamiarupusu, and Fuefuki. Yamanashi Prefecture is one of only eight landlocked prefectures, and the majority of the population lives in the central Kōfu Basin surrounded by the Akaishi Mountains, with 27% of its total land area being designated as Natural Parks. Yamanashi Prefecture is home to many of the highest mountains in Japan, and Mount Fuji, the tallest mountain in Japan and cultural icon of the country, is partially located in Yamanashi Prefecture on the border with Shizuoka Prefecture.

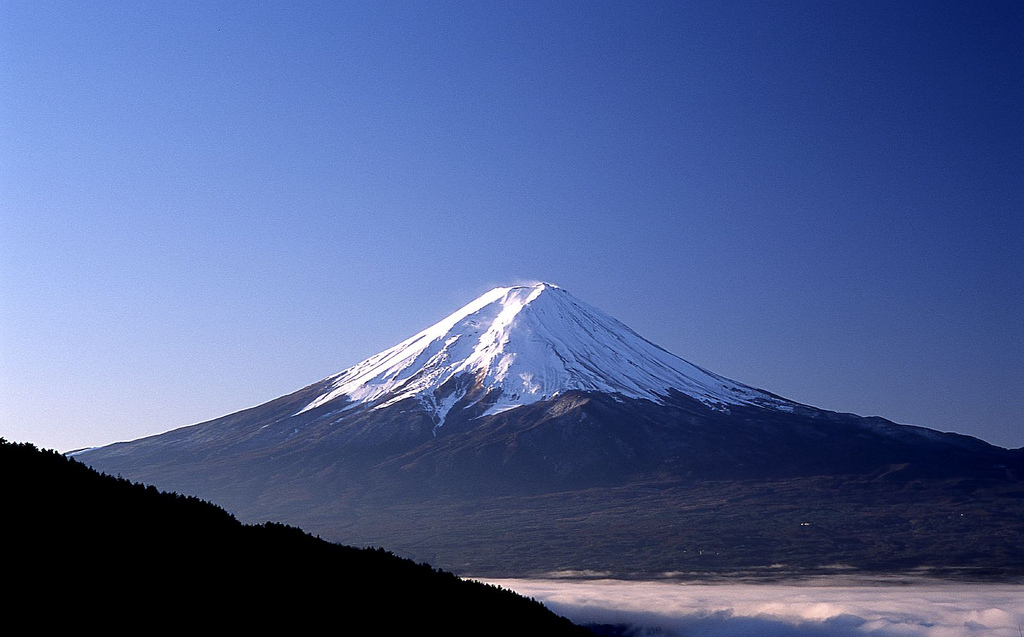
Mount Fuji from the Misaka Pass, Yamanashi

== Etymology ==
The name Yamanashi Prefecture literally means Pear Mountain. Nashi specifically refers to a local Japanese cultivar of the Asian pear, Pyrus pyrifolia.

== History ==
=== Pre-history to the 14th century ===
As in most other Japanese regions, prehistoric society in Yamanashi progressed through the hunting, fishing and gathering stage of the Jōmon period, then the rice-producing stage of the Yayoi period and subsequent village and regional formation. The Maruyama and Choshizuka Kofun (earthen burial mounds) located on Sone Hill of Nakamichi Town (Southern Kōfu) are believed to have been built from the end of the 4th century. From these remains it can be assumed that the people of Sone Hill had great influence.

During the Heian period, Kai Province was created in this area.

=== 15th to 19th centuries ===
Among the many Kaigenji generations, those of the Takeda, Ogasawara, and Nanbu families were particularly prosperous. During the Sengoku period of the 16th century, Takeda Shingen attained the status of daimyō and built Tsuzuji Mansion and the Yōgai Castle in Kōfu. From this base, he attempted to unify and control Japan.

After Takeda's death in 1582, Kai-no-Kuni came under the control of the Oda and Toyotomi clans before being subsumed into the Tokugawa shogunate during the Edo period. Beneath the Edo shogunate, the Kōfu clan (based in Kuninaka, or Central and Western Yamanashi) and the Yamura clan (based in Gunnai, or Eastern Yamanashi) were formed, but in 1724 the area came under the direct control of the Shogunate. With the development of the Kōshū Kaidō (highway) and Fuji River transport, goods, materials and culture flowed into the region.

By the mid-19th century, the contradictions of military government and clan system caused stability to erode and resistance to erupt across Japan, paving the way for the Meiji Restoration of 1868.

=== Meiji Restoration (1868) to end of World War II (1945) ===
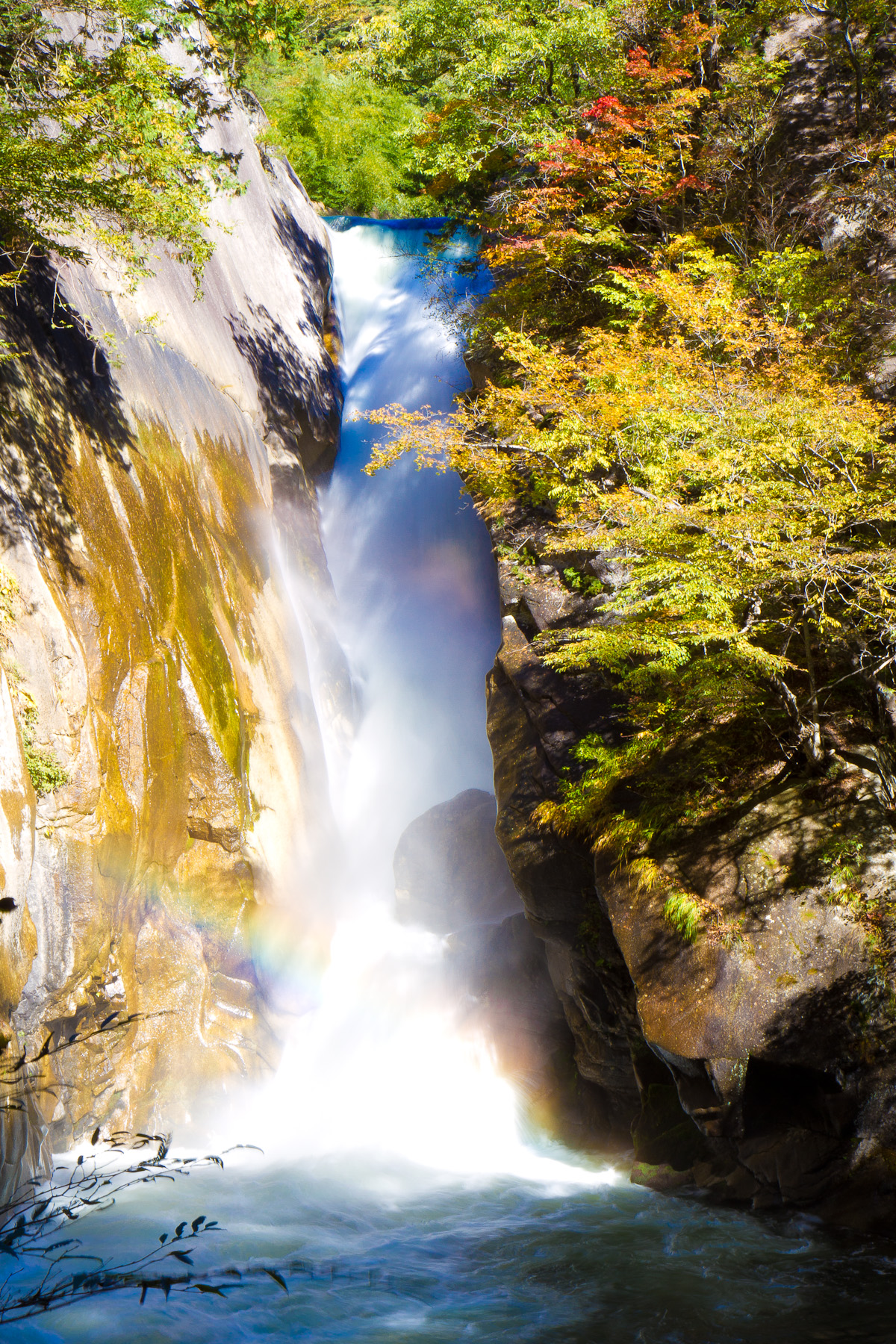
Autumn at Senga Falls, North of Kōfu

During the Boshin War, the Battle of Kōshū-Katsunuma on the 29 March 1868 was a significant battle between pro-Imperial and Tokugawa shogunate forces immediately prior to the Imperial Forces march on Edo Castle. Preceding the Kōshū-Katsunuma battle, Kōfu Castle had been captured by troops loyal to the Emperor Meiji.

The province was renamed Kōfu Prefecture in 1869 and then Yamanashi Prefecture in 1871. The anniversary of this event on November 20, 1872, is now celebrated as Prefectural Citizen's Day in Yamanashi.

In the early part of the Meiji period (1868–1911), industrial promotion policies furthered sericulture, silk textile production and wine making industries. In 1903, after seven years of construction, including the building of a nearly three mile long tunnel at the Sasago Pass, the Chūō Railway Line from Hachiōji and central Tokyo finally reached Kōfu. The reduced journey times to the capital and the port of Yokohama brought significant change to local industry and culture.

Agricultural production in farming communities was still on a small scale at the turn of the century and land reforms had yet to be introduced. From the 1920s however, tenancy and contract disputes between landowners and farmers in Yamanashi grew increasingly common.

In 1926, the Minobu Railway Line connecting Kōfu with Shizuoka Prefecture opened, bringing an end to Fuji River transportation. The Koumi Line connecting Kobuchizawa to Kiyosato was opened by Japanese National Railways (JNR) in 1933, providing access to hitherto remote highland areas on the slopes of Mt. Yatsugatake in the North of the prefecture.

=== 1945 to present ===
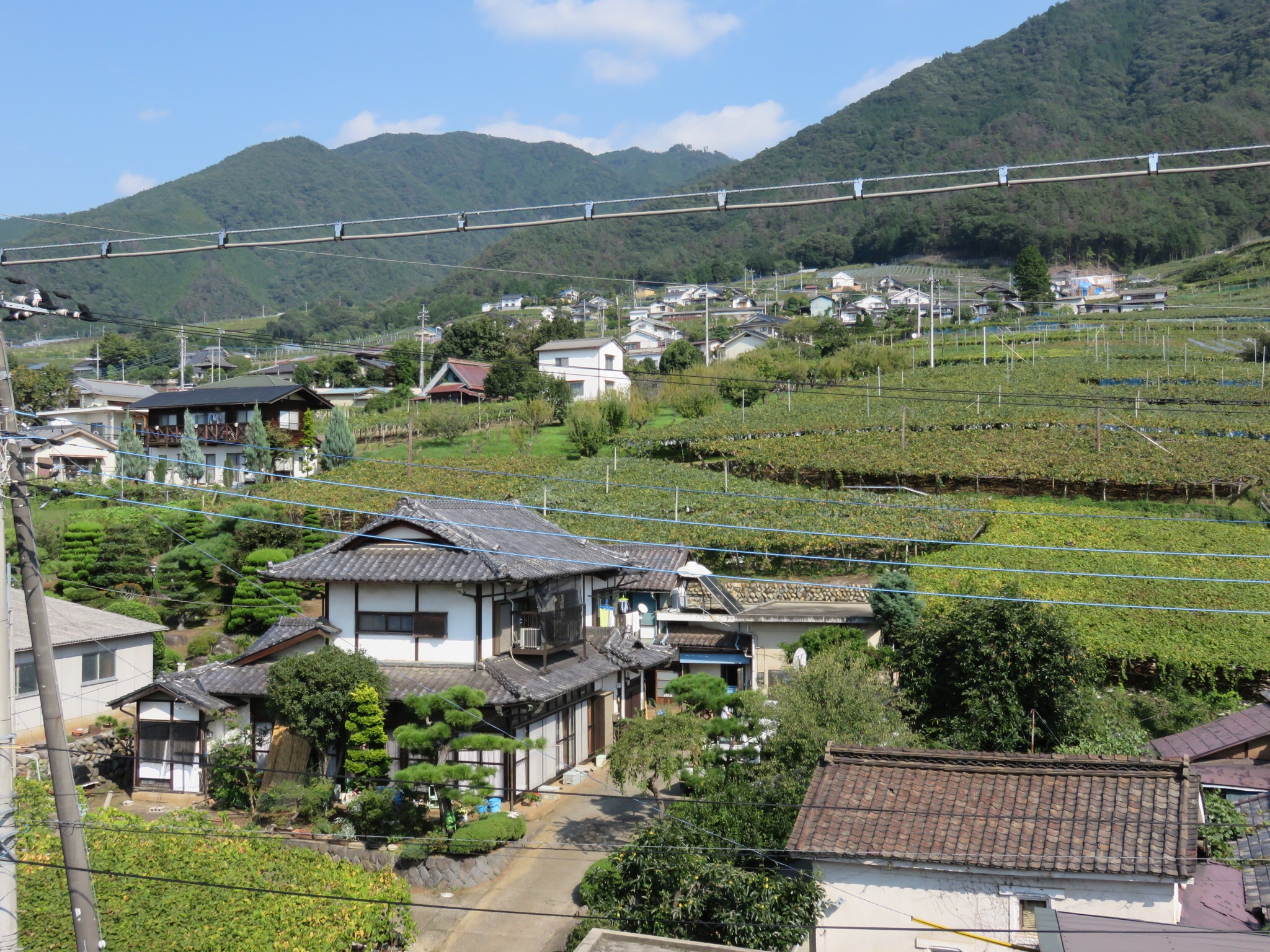
Vineyards in Kōshū, Yamanashi

The capital city, Kōfu, suffered extensive damage during a major air raid on the night of 6 July 1945. From 1945 onwards, as part of economic initiatives introduced under the post war Government of Occupation, agricultural land reforms significantly increased the number of individual farms and promoted fruit farming and viticulture throughout the prefecture. At first with limited success in 1946, but on a much more sustained basis in 1951, dairy farming, introduced by American Paul Rusch, became a feature of highland pastures surrounding the town of Kiyosato.

Small scale manufacturing industries and commerce grew at rapid speed during the expansion of the post-war Japanese economy. The 1982 opening of the Chūō Expressway also led to significant growth in service industries, transport logistics and tourism.

In common with many similar sized cities during the 1990s, rapid growth in car ownership, out of town shopping, and improved transportation links to Tokyo, caused a drop in commercial activity and land values in the center of the prefectural capital Kōfu. To counterbalance this trend the prefectural government launched a city center revitalization plan in 2008, promoting downtown tourist attractions such as redeveloped land North of Kōfu station, Maizuru Castle Park and new residential, cultural and government office facilities.

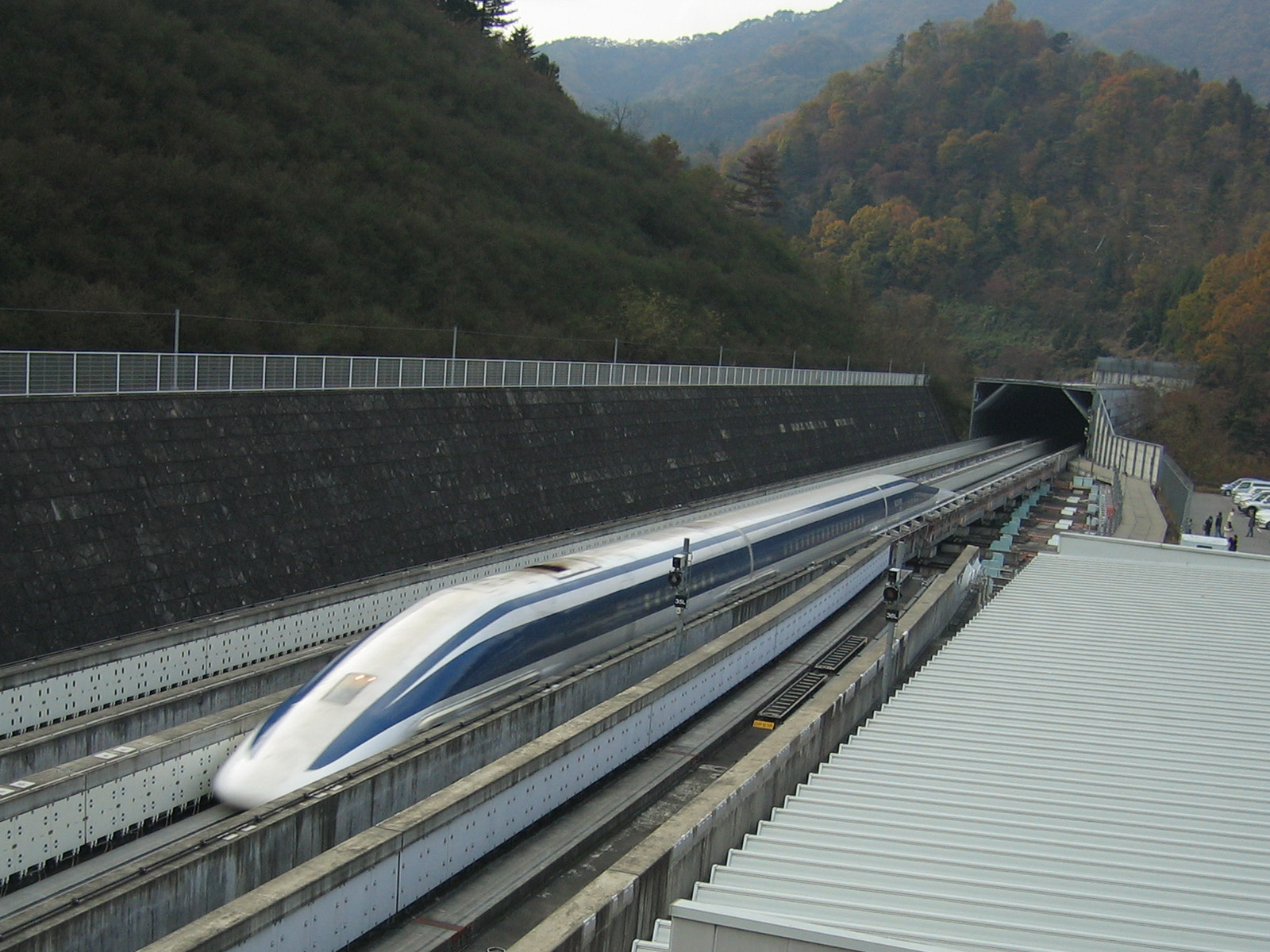
MLX01 maglev train at the Yamanashi test track

Planned changes in transportation infrastructure also promise to significantly impact the Yamanashi economy in the coming decades; under mountains in the eastern part of the prefecture is a completed 42.8 km section of the SCMaglev test track, a section of the planned Chūō Shinkansen.

The maglev line is designed to ultimately connect Tokyo, Nagoya, and Osaka with a station also planned to the South of Kōfu.

Central Government permission to proceed with an extension to the existing test track was granted on May 27, 2011. At the end of 2013 construction was already well advanced as far as Fuefuki.

JR Central is considering opening a demonstration service from a new station in Kōfu by the 2020 Summer Olympics so that visitors can also ride on the experimental track through the Yamanashi mountains.

== Geography ==
Yamanashi Prefecture is bordered by Tokyo, Kanagawa Prefecture, Saitama Prefecture, Shizuoka Prefecture, and Nagano Prefecture. The prefecture is landlocked, with high mountains surrounding the central Kōfu Basin. Mount Fuji and the Fuji Five Lakes region is located on the southern border with Shizuoka. Mount Fuji provides rain shadow effects, and as a result, the prefecture receives only about 818 mm of rainfall a year.

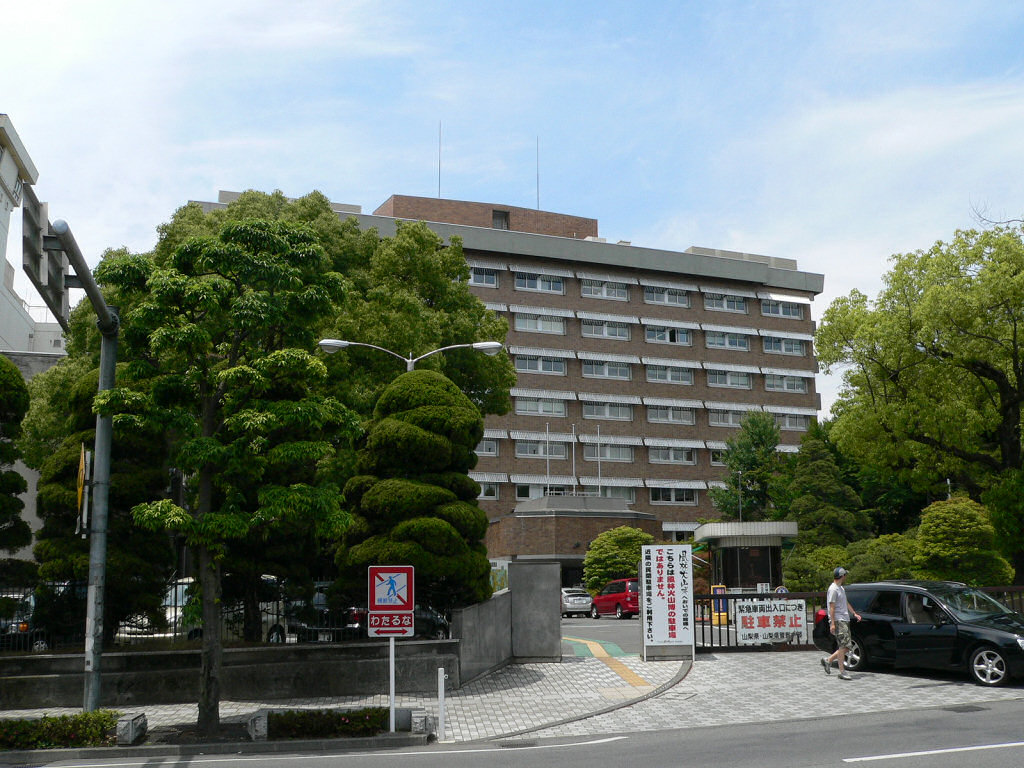
Prefectural Office

Map of Yamanashi Prefecture City Town Village

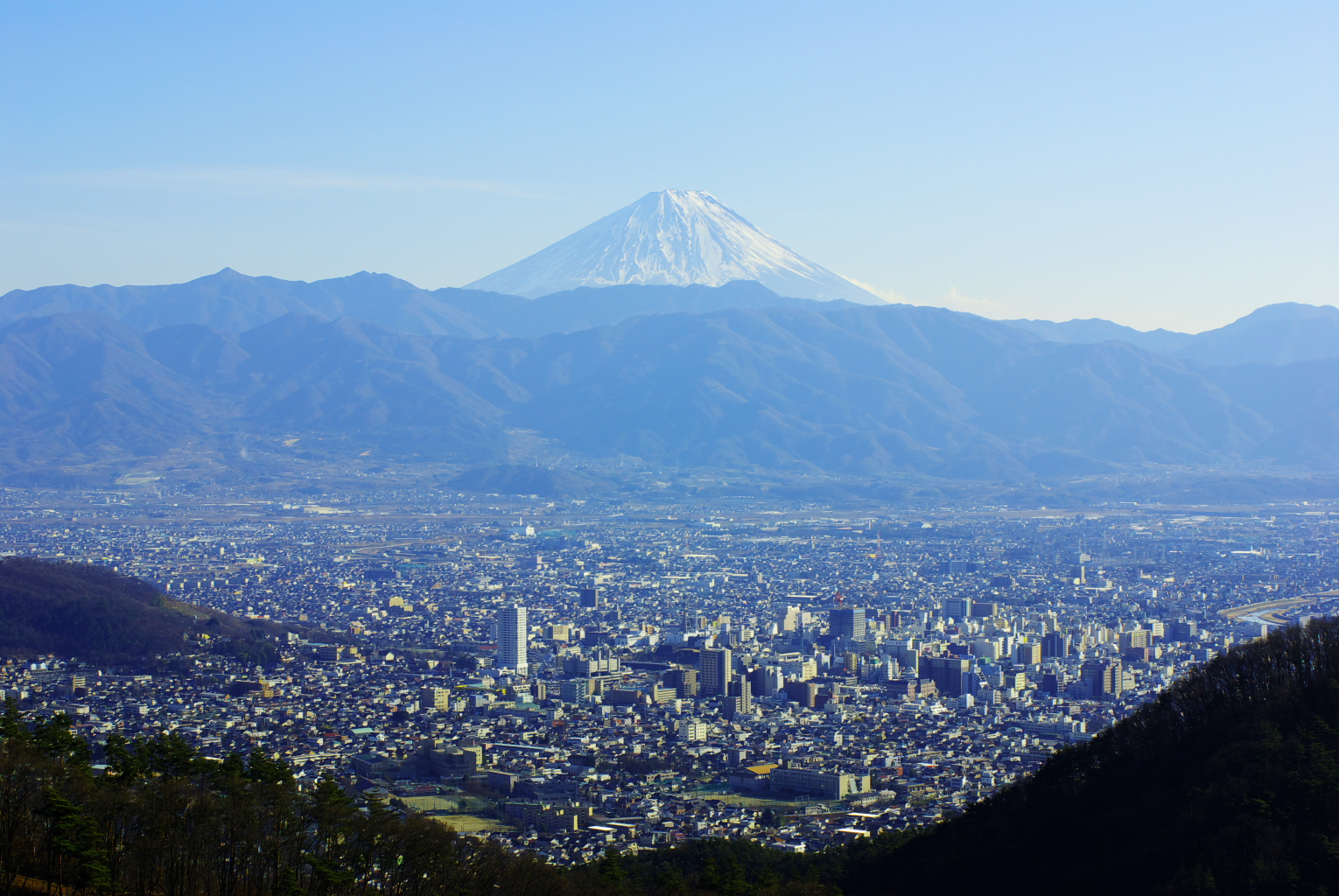
Kōfu Basin, Kōfu City and view of Mt. Fuji

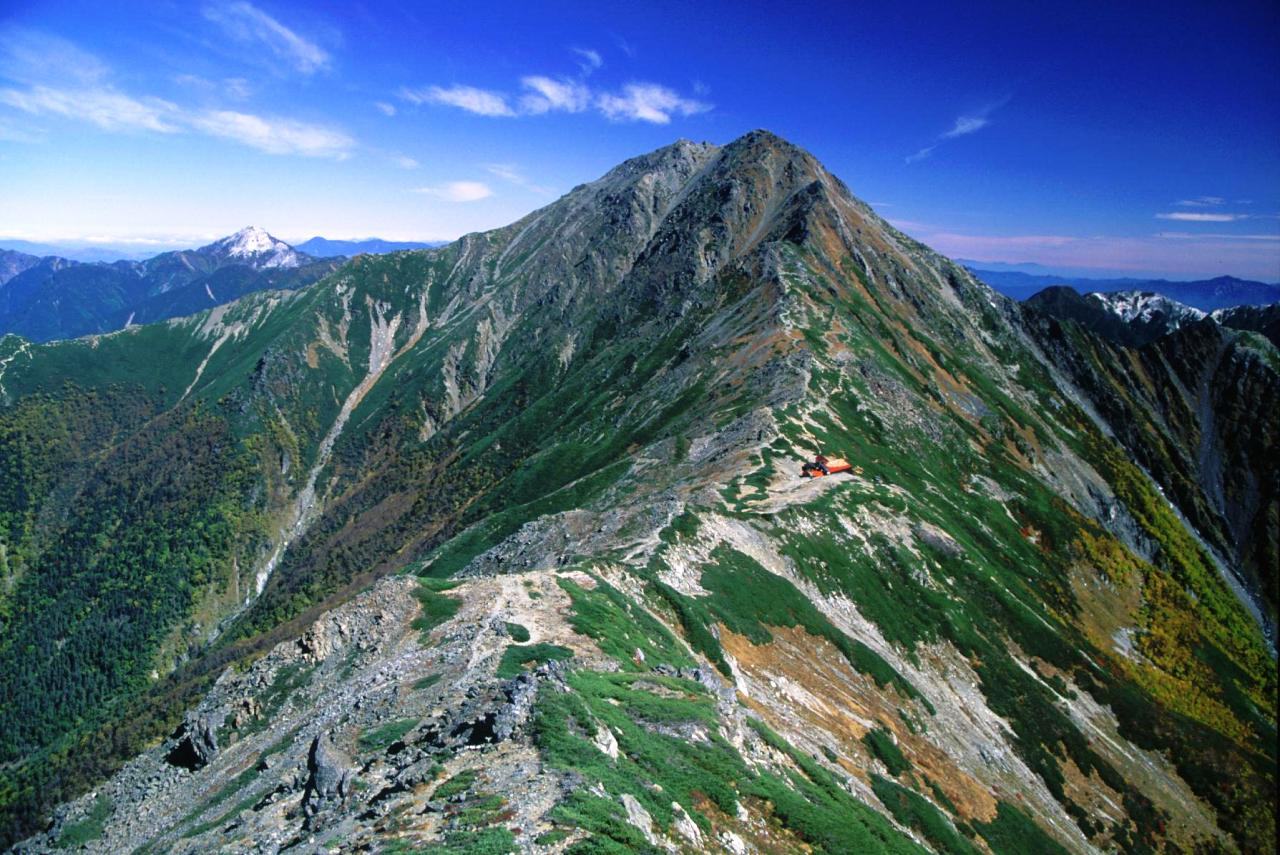
Mount Kita, Yamanashi, Japan's Second Highest Peak

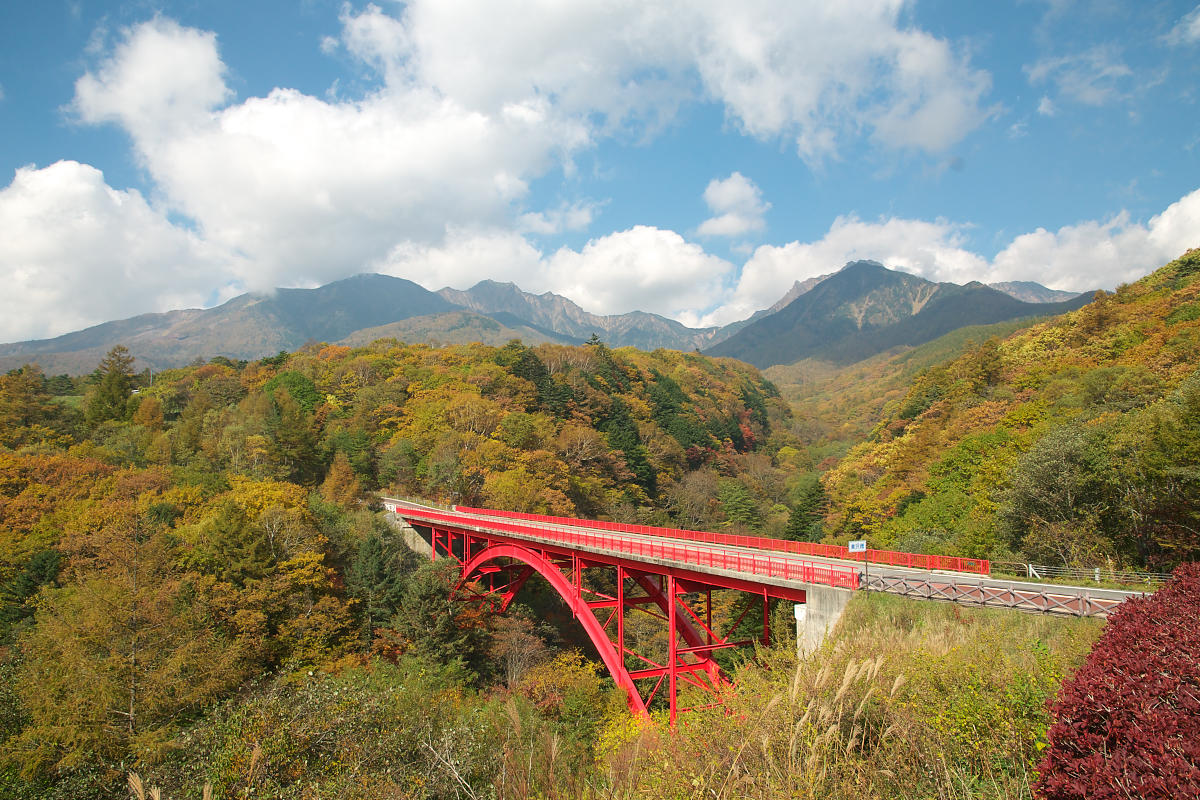
Yatsugatake-Kogen Higashizawa Bridge near Kiyosato

As of April 1, 2012, 27% of the total land area of the prefecture was designated as Natural Parks, namely the Chichibu Tama Kai, Fuji-Hakone-Izu, and Minami Alps National Parks; Yatsugatake-Chūshin Kōgen Quasi-National Park; and Minami Alps Koma and Shibireko Prefectural Natural Parks.

78% of the prefecture is covered by forests, making it one of the most densely wooded prefectures in Japan. Land cultivated for agriculture is mainly restricted to the lower elevations of the Kōfu basin.

=== Cities ===
Thirteen cities are located in Yamanashi Prefecture:

Name		Area (km^{2})	Population	Map
Rōmaji	Kanji	Area (km^{2})	Population	Map
Chūō	中央市	31.69	30,835	
Fuefuki	笛吹市	201.92	69,463	
Fujiyoshida	富士吉田市	121.74	48,782	
Hokuto	北杜市	602.48	46,888	
Kai	甲斐市	71.95	75,706	
Kōfu (capital)	甲府市	212.47	187,985	
Kōshū	甲州市	264.11	31,526	
Minami-Alps	南アルプス市	264.14	71,618	
Nirasaki	韮崎市	143.69	29,483	
Ōtsuki	大月市	280.25	23,976	
Tsuru	都留市	161.63	30,311	
Uenohara	上野原市	170.57	23,158	
Yamanashi	山梨市	289.8	34,738	

=== Towns and villages ===
These are the towns and villages in each district:

Name		Area (km^{2})	Population	District	Type	Map
Rōmaji	Kanji	Area (km^{2})	Population	District	Type	Map
Dōshi	道志村	79.57	1,676	Minamitsuru District	Village	
Fujikawa	富士川町	111.98	15,125	Minamikoma District	Town	
Fujikawaguchiko	富士河口湖町	158.4	26,540	Minamitsuru District	Town	
Hayakawa	早川町	369.86	994	Minamikoma District	Town	
Ichikawamisato	市川三郷町	75.18	15,799	Nishiyatsushiro District	Town	
Kosuge	小菅村	52.78	701	Kitatsuru District	Village	
Minobu	身延町	302	11,674	Minamikoma District	Town	
Nanbu	南部町	200.63	7,222	Minamikoma District	Town	
Narusawa	鳴沢村	89.58	3,152	Minamitsuru District	Village	
Nishikatsura	西桂町	15.22	4,298	Minamitsuru District	Town	
Oshino	忍野村	25.05	9,710	Minamitsuru District	Village	
Shōwa	昭和町	9.08	20,338	Nakakoma District	Town	
Tabayama	丹波山村	101.3	529	Kitatsuru District	Village	
Yamanakako	山中湖村	52.81	5,826	Minamitsuru District	Village	

== List of governors of Yamanashi Prefecture ==
Name	Start	End
Katsuyasu Yoshie (吉江勝保)	12 April 1947	29 April 1951
Hisashi Amano (天野久)	30 April 1951	16 February 1967
Kunio Tanabe (田辺国男)	17 February 1967	16 February 1979
Komei Mochizuki (望月幸明)	17 February 1979	16 February 1991
Ken Amano (天野建)	17 February 1991	16 February 2003
Takahiko Yamamoto (山本栄彦)	17 February 2003	16 February 2007
Shōmei Yokouchi (横内 正明)	17 February 2007	16 February 2015
Hitoshi Goto (後藤 斎)	17 February 2015	16 February 2019
Kotaro Nagasaki (長崎幸太郎)	17 February 2019	Present

== Economy ==
Yamanashi has a sizable industrial base in and around Kōfu city, with jewelry and robotics industries being particularly prominent. The headquarters of FANUC, manufacturer of factory automation systems, is based in Oshino in the south of the prefecture.

The prefecture is also host to numerous fruit farms and vineyards. Yamanashi is one of the major fruit producing regions in Japan, being the top domestic producer of grapes, peaches, plums as well as wine.

In addition, roughly 40% of the mineral water bottled in Japan comes from Yamanashi, mainly from around the Southern Alps, Mount Fuji, and Mitsutōge areas. The quality of the water sources in the Southern Alps prompted Suntory Group to open the Hakushu distillery in the northern Yamanashi town of Hokuto.

== Population ==
Yamanashi prefecture population pyramid in 2020

Historical population
Year	Pop.	±% p.a.
1920	583,453	—
1925	600,675	+0.58%
1930	631,042	+0.99%
1935	646,727	+0.49%
1940	663,026	+0.50%
1945	839,057	+4.82%
1950	811,369	−0.67%
1955	807,044	−0.11%
1960	782,062	−0.63%
1965	763,194	−0.49%
1970	762,029	−0.03%
1975	783,050	+0.55%
1980	804,256	+0.54%
1985	832,832	+0.70%
1990	852,966	+0.48%
1995	881,996	+0.67%
2000	888,172	+0.14%
2005	884,515	−0.08%
2010	863,075	−0.49%
2015	834,930	−0.66%
2020	809,974	−0.61%
Source: Censuses

Per Japanese census data, Yamanashi prefecture had negative population growth from 1950 to 1970 and again in the 21st century, with the population peaking at roughly 890,000 around the turn of the millennium.

== Tourism ==
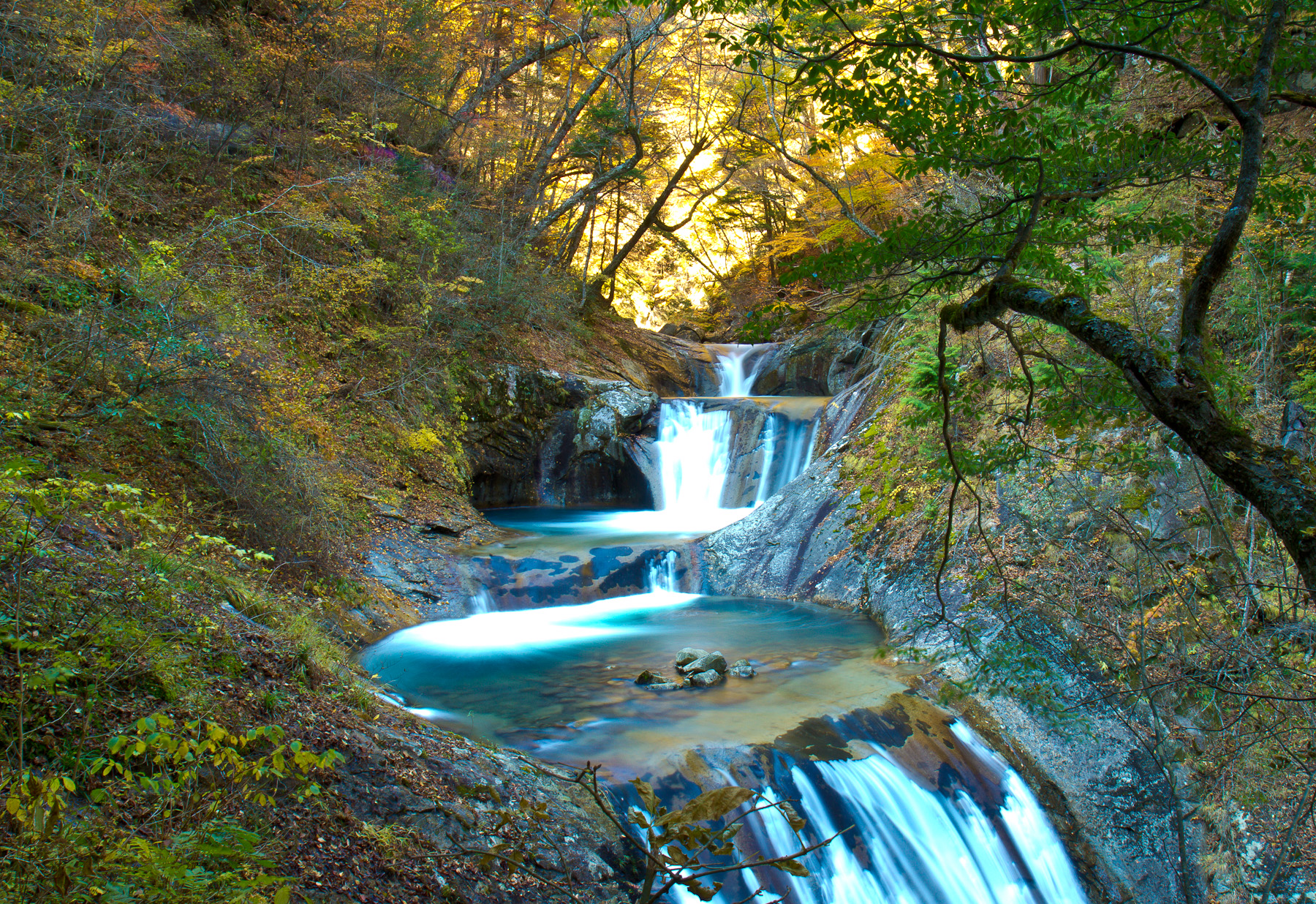
Nishizawa Waterfall on the Fuefuki River, Chichibu-Tama-Kai National Park, Yamanashi

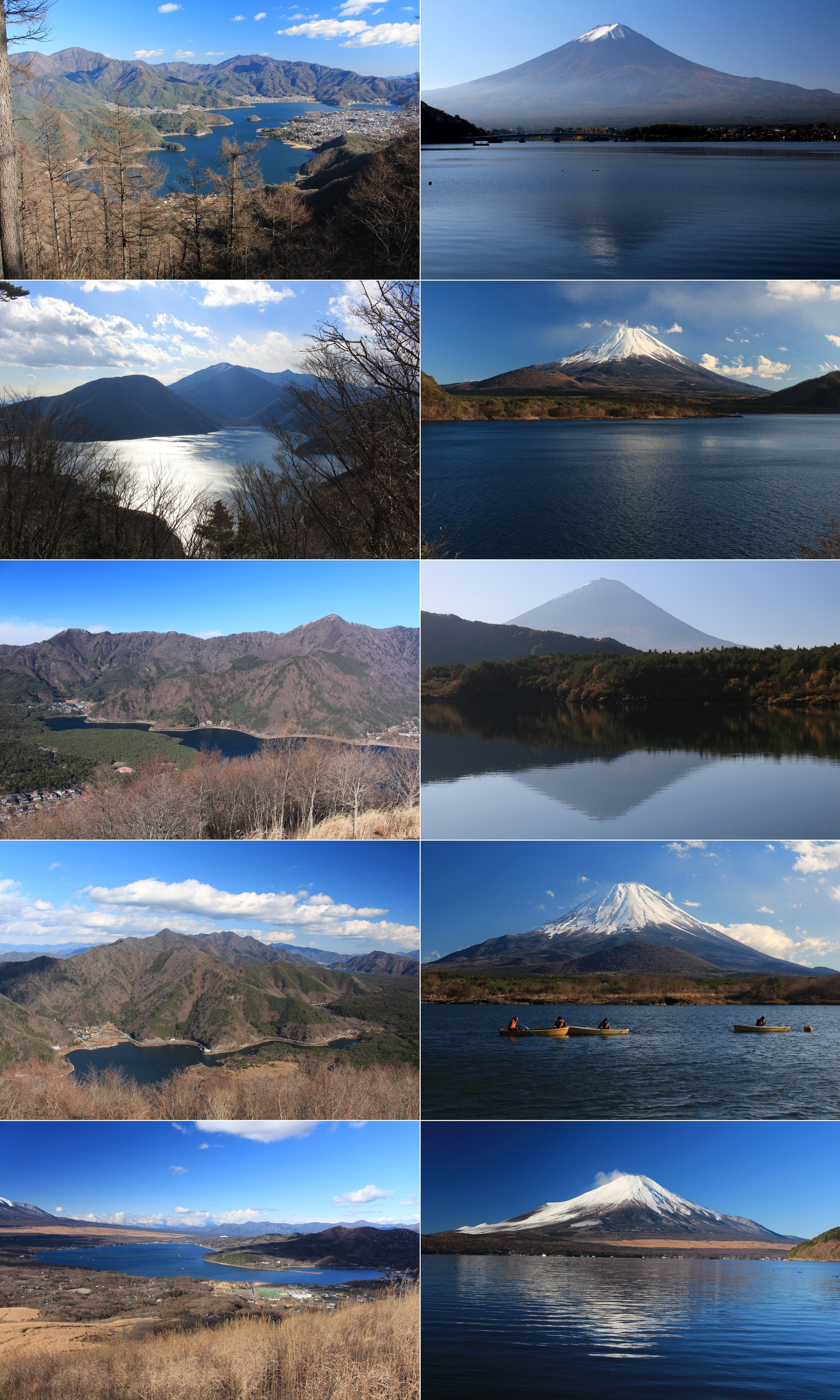
Mount Fuji, Fuji Five Lakes region, Yamanashi

The natural scenery and cultural sights of Yamanashi are popular destinations for both domestic and international tourists due to the prefecture's proximity to the crowded Tokyo conurbation and ease of access by road and rail. Mount Fuji, the Fuji Five Lakes region, the highland resort region of Kiyosato, the city of Kōfu, the Senga Falls, Koshu wineries, the temple of Erin-ji in Koshu, and the Kuonji Temple at Minobu are a few of the most popular places to visit.

The Fuji-Q Highland amusement park at Fujiyoshida with roller coasters Eejanaika, and Takabisha, the world's steepest roller coaster, is also a popular destination for day trips.

The natural topography of the region makes Yamanashi popular with mountaineering, hiking and climbing enthusiasts throughout the year. The highest mountain in Japan, Mount Fuji, at 3,776 m (12,388 ft) and the second highest mountain in Japan, Mount Kita, at 3,193 m (10,476 ft) are both located within Yamanashi. The Mt. Fuji summer hiking season in July and August attracts thousands of overnight hikers typically starting at the Fifth Station in the late evening and climbing through the night to witness the sunrise at the summit.

Although not as tall, Mount Minobu, a popular place for Buddhist pilgrimage, offers extensive views from the summit of the mountain. Parts of the Fuji-Hakone-Izu National Park, Chichibu-Tama-Kai National Park, and Minami Alps National Park are all located in Yamanashi.

Given the area's volcanic activity, natural hot springs, or onsens, are found in abundance. Some of the more well known are Shimobe Onsen, Isawa Onsen and Yamanami Onsen.

The mascot of the prefecture is Hishimaru (菱丸), a Kai Ken dog who is based on the local Sengoku-era daimyō Takeda Shingen. He wears a kabuto with the crest of the Takeda clan.

== Major festivals ==
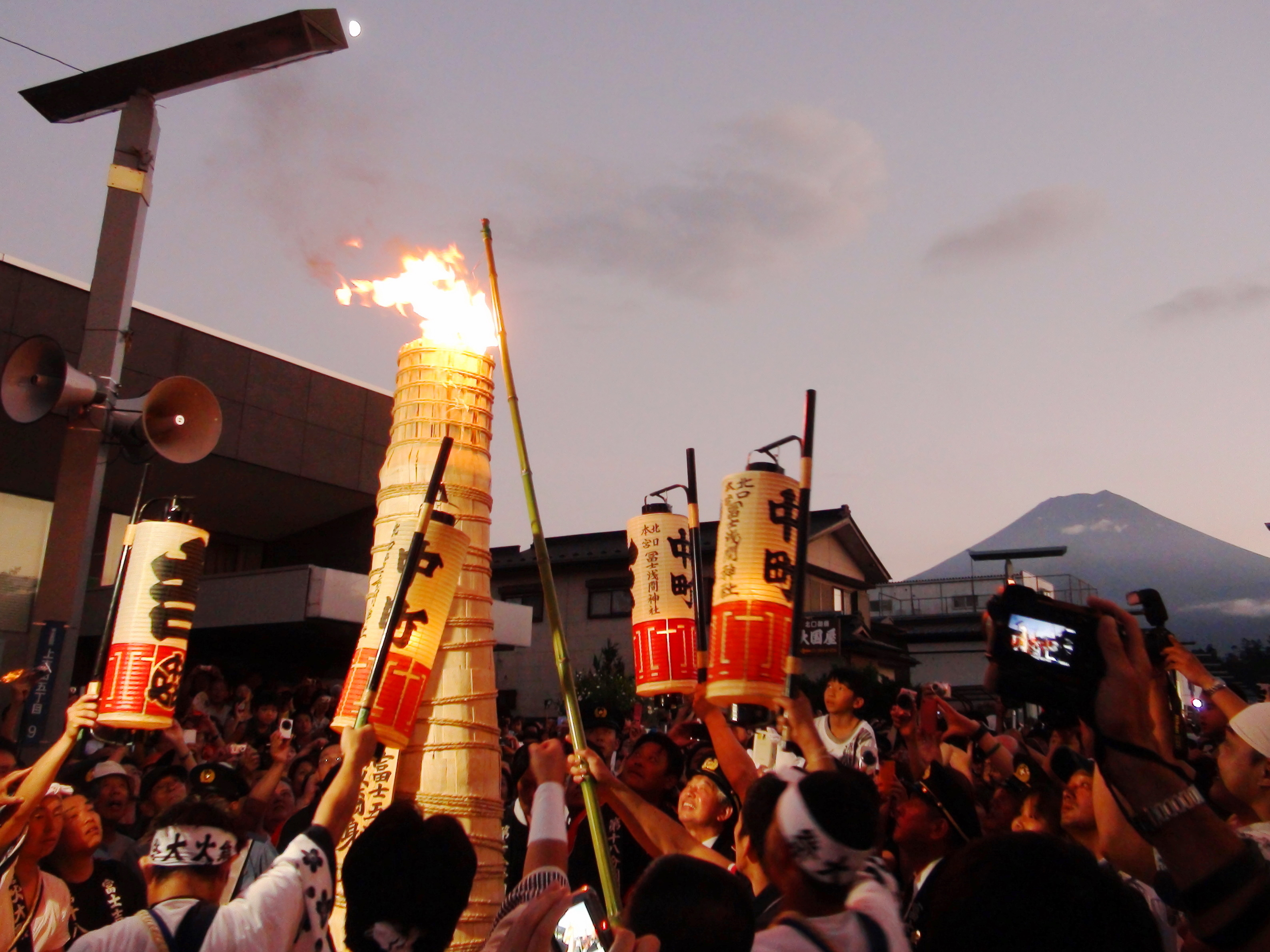
Lighting street torches at the Fujiyoshida, Yamanashi, Fire Festival

- Shingen festival, held each March in the precincts of Kōfu Castle and Takeda Shrine in commemoration of Takeda Shingen's role in prefectural history.
- Fujiyoshida fire festival, marks the end of the summer climbing season on Mount Fuji. Held on the last weekend in August.
- Yatsugatake county fair and Paul Rusch festival. Held each October in Kiyosato to celebrate the life and work of Paul Rusch, his contributions to local agricultural development and US Japan friendship.

== Universities ==
- Tsuru University
- University of Yamanashi
- Yamanashi Eiwa College
- Yamanashi Gakuin University
- Yamanashi Prefectural University

== Sports ==
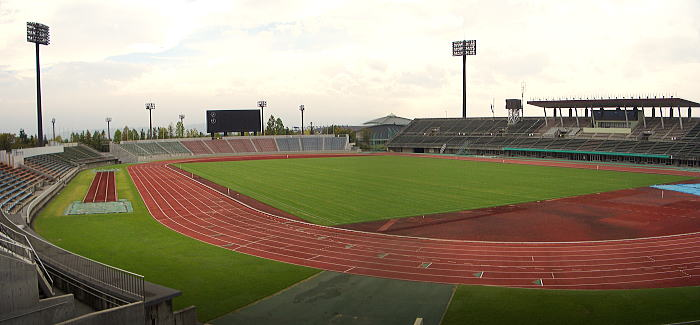
Yamanashi Chuo Bank Stadium in Kōfu.

Ventforet Kōfu, the J2 League association football (soccer) team is based in Kōfu. The team's home ground is the Yamanashi Chuo Bank Stadium.

Since 2005 the Fujizakura Country Club in Fujikawaguchiko has also hosted the Fujisankei Classic golf tournament, an annual event on the Japan Golf Tour.

== Transportation ==
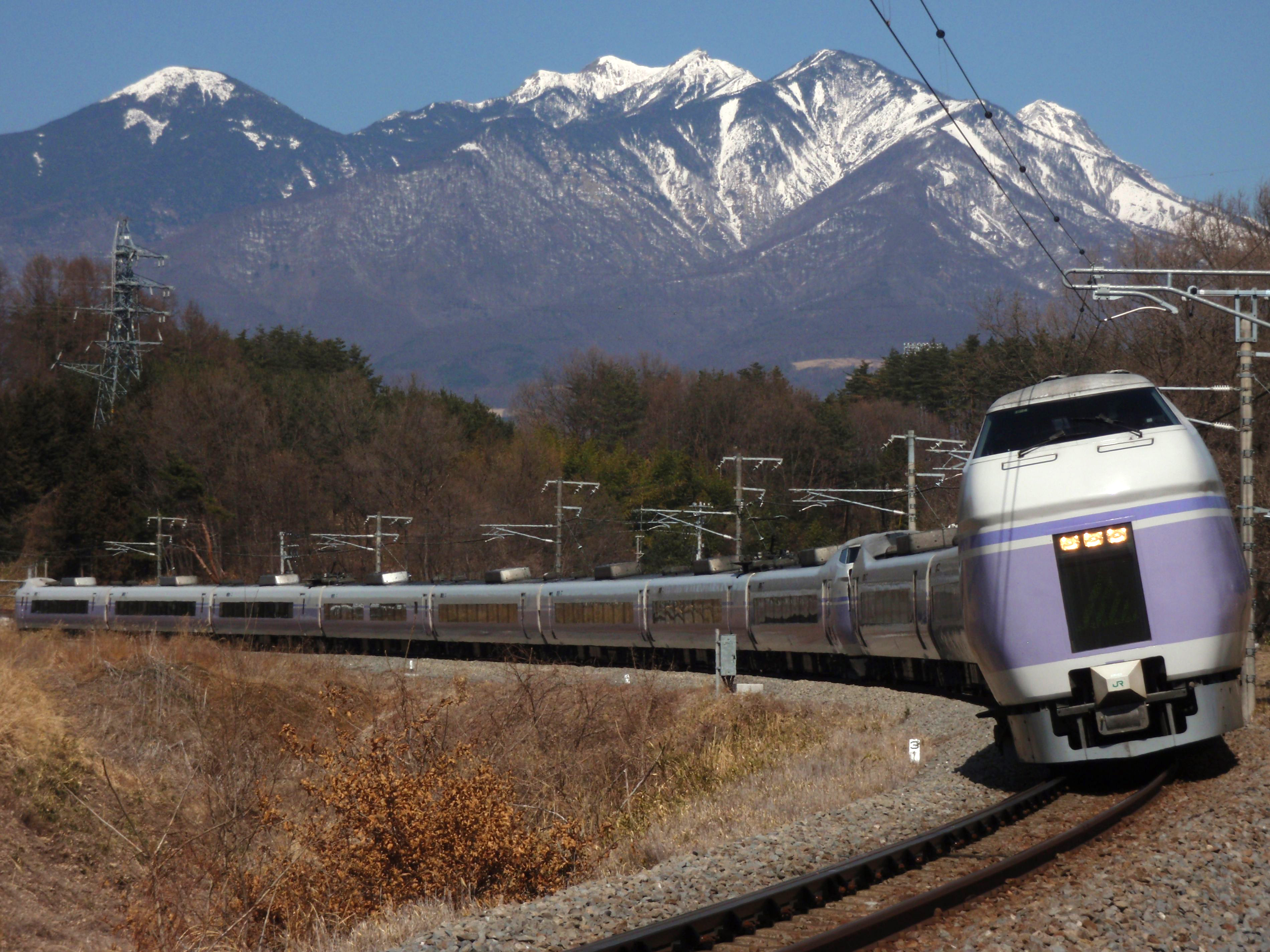
JR Chuo Main Line Super Azusa passing Yatsugatake, near Hokuto, Yamanashi

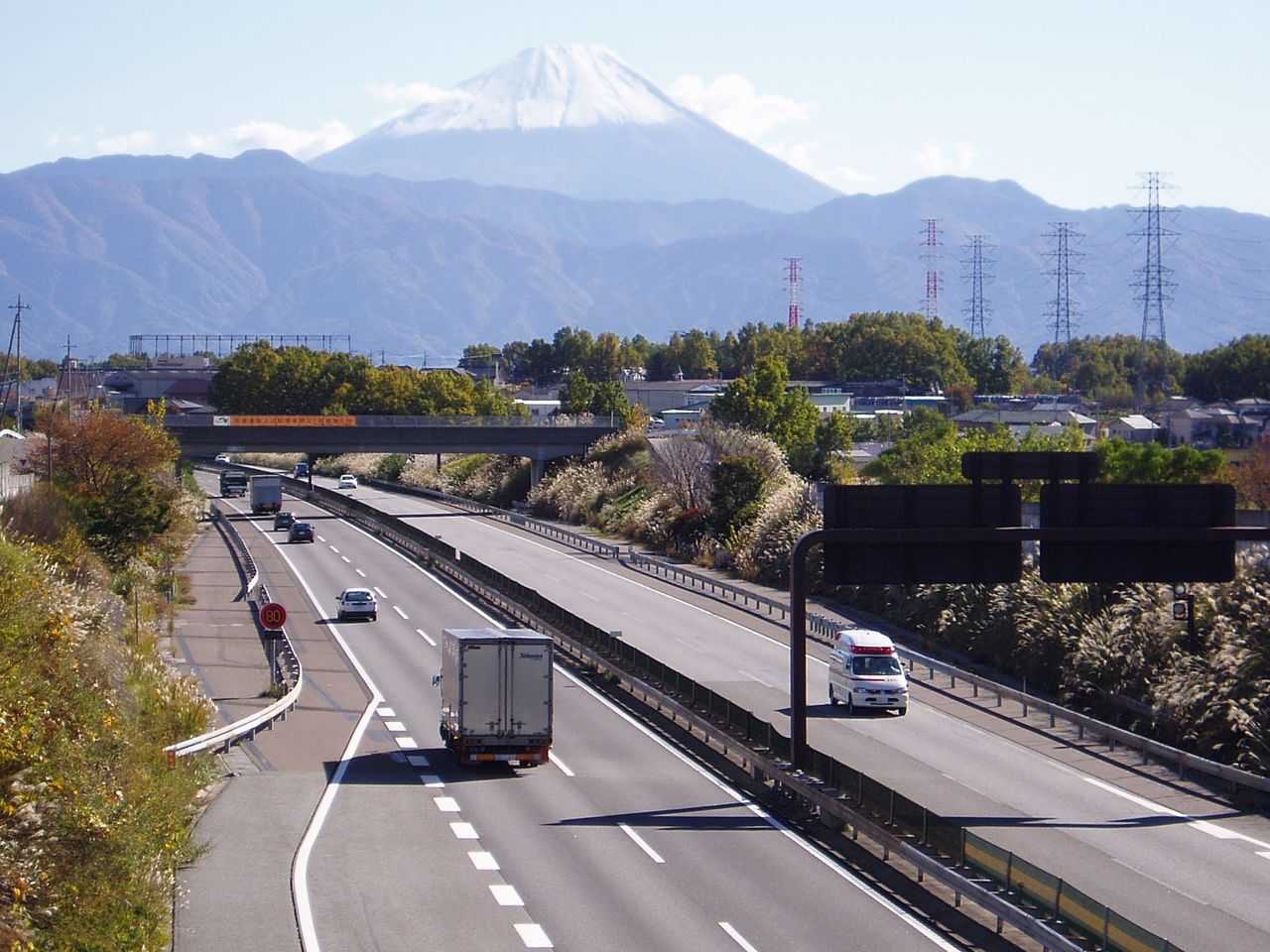
Chuo Expressway, near Kai, Yamanashi

=== Railway lines ===
- Central Japan Railway Company
  - Minobu Line
- Chūō Shinkansen(Under construction)
- East Japan Railway Company
  - Chūō Main Line
  - Koumi Line
- Fuji Kyuko
  - Fujikyuko Line

=== Road ===
==== Expressways ====
- Chūbu-Ōdan Expressway (under construction)
- Chuo Expressway
- Higashifuji-goko Road
- Kōfu Yamanashi Road

==== National highways ====
- Route 20
- Route 52
- Route 137
- Route 138
- Route 139
- Route 140
- Route 141
- Route 411
- Route 413
- Route 469

== Media ==
=== Television ===
- UHF Television Yamanashi (UTY)
- Yamanashi Broadcasting System (YBS)

=== Radio ===
- FM Fuji (FMF)

== International relations ==
- (South Korea) Chungcheongbuk-do, Korea, since 1992
- Fairfield, California, United States, since the 1970s
- Iowa, United States, since 1960
- Madison County, Kentucky, United States, since 1988
- Minas Gerais, Brazil, since 1973
- Saône-et-Loire, France, since 2000
- Sichuan Province, China, since 1985
