= List of twin towns and sister cities in China =

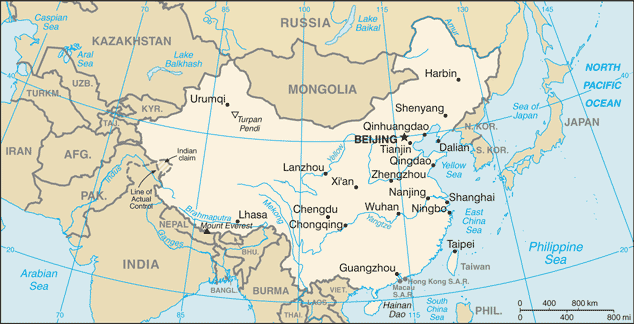
Map of China

This is a list of places in China which have standing links to local communities in other countries known as "town twinning" (usually in Europe) or "sister cities" (usually in the rest of the world).

== A ==
Anguo

- Dongdaemun (Seoul), South Korea
- Kushima, Japan

Anqing

- Calabasas, United States
- Cheboksary, Russia
- Ibaraki, Japan
- Kütahya, Turkey

Anshan

- Amagasaki, Japan
- Ansan, South Korea
- Birmingham, United States
- Bursa, Turkey
- Holon, Israel
- Lipetsk, Russia
- Sheffield, England, United Kingdom

== B ==
Baoding

- Charlotte, United States
- Hafnarfjörður, Iceland
- Saijō, Japan
- Santiago de Veraguas, Panama
- Sønderborg, Denmark
- Yonago, Japan

Baotou

- Mbombela, South Africa
- Orkhon, Mongolia

Beihai

- Gold Coast, Australia
- Hat Yai, Thailand
- Imatra, Finland
- Jablonec nad Nisou, Czech Republic
- Kep, Cambodia
- Leduc, Canada
- Leduc County, Canada
- Puerto Princesa, Philippines
- Semarang, Indonesia
- Suva, Fiji
- Tulsa, United States
- Yatsushiro, Japan

Beijing

- Addis Ababa, Ethiopia
- Ankara, Turkey
- Astana, Kazakhstan
- Athens, Greece
- Bangkok, Thailand
- Berlin, Germany
- Brussels, Belgium
- Bucharest, Romania
- Budapest, Hungary
- Buenos Aires, Argentina
- Cairo, Egypt
- Canberra, Australia
- Cologne, Germany
- Copenhagen, Denmark
- Delhi, India
- Doha, Qatar
- (Republic of Ireland) Dublin, Ireland
- Gauteng, South Africa
- Hanoi, Vietnam
- Havana, Cuba
- Île-de-France, France
- Islamabad, Pakistan
- Jakarta, Indonesia
- Kyiv, Ukraine
- Lima, Peru
- London, England, United Kingdom
- Manila, Philippines
- Minsk, Belarus
- Mexico City, Mexico
- Moscow, Russia
- New South Wales, Australia
- New York City, United States
- Ottawa, Canada
- Phnom Penh, Cambodia
- Riga, Latvia
- Rio de Janeiro, Brazil
- San José, Costa Rica
- Santiago, Chile
- Seoul, South Korea
- Tehran, Iran
- Tel Aviv, Israel
- Tirana, Albania
- Tokyo, Japan
- Ulaanbaatar, Mongolia
- Vientiane, Laos
- Washington, D.C., United States
- Wellington, New Zealand

Bengbu

- Barra Mansa, Brazil
- Bergamo, Italy
- Settsu, Japan
- Szolnok, Hungary
- Tameside, England, United Kingdom

Bozhou

- Cognac, France
- Kyōtango, Japan
- Quevedo, Ecuador
- Shimanto, Japan
- Vinhedo, Brazil
- Witzenberg, South Africa
- Yeongju, South Korea

== C ==
Changchun

- Chongjin, North Korea
- Hjørring, Denmark
- Krasnoyarsk, Russia
- Little Rock, United States
- Masterton, New Zealand
- Minsk, Belarus
- Novi Sad, Serbia
- Plovdiv, Bulgaria
- Prachinburi, Thailand
- Sendai, Japan
- Tijuana, Mexico
- Ulan-Ude, Russia
- Ulsan, South Korea
- Warrnambool, Australia
- Windsor, Canada
- Žilina, Slovakia

Changji

- Barnaul, Russia

Changsha

- (Republic of the Congo) Brazzaville, Congo
- Gumi, South Korea
- Kagoshima, Japan
- Mogilev, Belarus
- Mons, Belgium
- New Haven, United States
- Ölfus, Iceland
- Saint Paul, United States
- Sol Plaatje, South Africa
- Ulyanovsk, Russia

Changshu

- Ayabe, Japan
- Essaouira, Morocco
- Satsumasendai, Japan
- Townsville, Australia
- Whittier, United States

Changzhou

- Beau Bassin-Rose Hill, Mauritius
- Buffalo, United States
- Caxias do Sul, Brazil
- Curitiba, Brazil
- Dar es Salaam, Tanzania
- Eskişehir, Turkey
- Essen, Germany
- Georges River, Australia
- Jelenia Góra, Poland
- Johor Bahru, Malaysia
- Minden, Germany
- Namyangju, South Korea
- Netanya, Israel
- Niagara Falls, Canada
- Prato, Italy
- Rockford, United States
- Satakunta, Finland
- La Serena, Chile
- Solihull, England, United Kingdom
- Stavropol, Russia
- Tapachula, Mexico
- Takatsuki, Japan
- Tilburg, Netherlands
- Tokorozawa, Japan
- Torrington, United States
- Wyndham, Australia

Chaohu

- Dole, France
- Pergamino, Argentina

Chengdu

- Bengaluru, India
- Bonn, Germany
- Chiang Mai, Thailand
- Daegu, South Korea
- Fez, Morocco
- (Republic of Ireland) Fingal, Ireland
- Flemish Brabant, Belgium
- Gimcheon, South Korea
- Gold Coast, Australia
- Gomel, Belarus
- Haifa, Israel
- Hamilton, New Zealand
- Honolulu, United States
- Horsens, Denmark
- Kathmandu, Nepal
- Kōfu, Japan
- Lahore, Pakistan
- Linz, Austria
- Ljubljana, Slovenia
- Łódź, Poland
- Luang Prabang, Laos
- Maastricht, Netherlands
- Maputo, Mozambique
- Mechelen, Belgium
- Medan, Indonesia
- Montpellier, France
- Nashville, United States
- Palermo, Italy
- Perth, Australia
- Phoenix, United States
- La Plata, Argentina
- Recife, Brazil
- Sheffield, England, United Kingdom
- Volgograd, Russia
- Winnipeg, Canada
- Zapopan, Mexico

Chenzhou

- Laredo, United States

Chizhou

- Cumberland, Australia
- Florencio Varela, Argentina
- Gurye, South Korea
- Svenljunga, Sweden

Chongqing

- Antwerp Province, Belgium
- Aswan, Egypt
- Bangkok, Thailand
- Brisbane, Australia
- Chennai, India
- Chiang Mai, Thailand
- Córdoba Province, Argentina
- Detroit, United States
- Düsseldorf, Germany
- Gers, France
- Hiroshima, Japan
- Incheon, South Korea
- Leicester, England, United Kingdom
- Maribor, Slovenia
- Mpumalanga, South Africa
- Pest County, Hungary
- Phnom Penh, Cambodia
- Pitești, Romania
- Seattle, United States
- Shiraz, Iran
- Sliven, Bulgaria
- Toronto, Canada
- Toulouse, France
- Ulaanbaatar, Mongolia
- Vladimir, Russia
- Voronezh, Russia
- Zaporizhzhia Oblast, Ukraine

Chongqing – Nanchuan

- Linden, Guyana

Cixi

- Bayside, Australia
- Bakersfield, United States

== D ==
Dalian

- Bremen, Germany
- Cape Breton, Canada
- Enschede, Netherlands
- Glasgow, Scotland, United Kingdom
- Kitakyushu, Japan
- Le Havre, France
- Maizuru, Japan
- Oakland, United States
- (Republic of the Congo) Pointe-Noire, Congo
- Rostock, Germany
- Vladivostok, Russia

Dandong

- Wilmington, United States

Daqing

- Calgary, Canada
- Charters Towers, Australia
- East London, South Africa
- Quatre Bornes, Mauritius
- Tyumen, Russia

Datong

- Bury, England, United Kingdom
- Ōmuta, Japan

Deqing

- Monticello, United States
- Valls, Spain

Deyang

- Gangneung, South Korea
- Higashihiroshima, Japan
- Konin, Poland
- Lahti, Finland
- Muncie, United States
- Siegen-Wittgenstein (district), Germany

Dujiangyan

- Ähtäri, Finland
- Borna, Germany
- Chūō, Japan
- Gisors-Epte-Lévrière (intercommunality), France
- Kai, Japan
- Minami-Alps, Japan
- Ōtake, Japan
- Shōwa, Japan

Dunhuang

- Aurangabad, India
- Kamakura, Japan
- Namhae, South Korea

== E ==
Emeishan

- Kashiwazaki, Japan

== F ==
Foshan

- Ingolstadt, Germany
- Itami, Japan
- Naro-Fominsky District, Russia
- Port Louis, Mauritius
- Port Vila, Vanuatu
- La Possession, Réunion, France
- St. George's, Grenada
- Starogard Gdański, Poland
- Stockton, United States
- Townsville, Australia

Fuzhou

- Campinas, Brazil
- Georgetown, Guyana
- Hạ Long, Vietnam
- Honolulu, United States
- Koszalin, Poland
- Liège, Belgium
- Manila, Philippines
- Mombasa, Kenya
- Nagasaki, Japan
- Naha, Japan
- Nouadhibou, Mauritania
- Omsk, Russia
- Río Gallegos, Argentina
- Semarang, Indonesia
- Shoalhaven, Australia
- Siem Reap, Cambodia
- Syracuse, United States
- Tacoma, United States

== G ==
Guang'an

- Boulogne-Billancourt, France
- Gumi, South Korea

Guanghan

- Auburn, United States

Guangzhou

- Ahmedabad, India
- Arequipa, Peru
- Auckland, New Zealand
- Bangkok, Thailand
- Bari, Italy
- Birmingham, England, United Kingdom
- Bristol, England, United Kingdom
- Buenos Aires, Argentina
- Dubai, United Arab Emirates
- Durban, South Africa
- Frankfurt am Main, Germany
- Fukuoka, Japan
- Gwangju, South Korea
- Hambantota, Sri Lanka
- Harare, Zimbabwe
- Istanbul, Turkey
- Kazan, Russia
- Kuwait City, Kuwait
- Łódź, Poland
- Los Angeles, United States
- Lyon, France
- Manila, Philippines
- Mombasa, Kenya
- Noboribetsu, Japan
- Pokhara, Nepal
- Quito, Ecuador
- Rabat, Morocco
- Recife, Brazil
- San José, Costa Rica
- Santiago, Chile
- Surabaya, Indonesia
- Sydney, Australia
- Tampere, Finland
- Valencia, Spain
- Vancouver, Canada
- Vilnius, Lithuania
- Yekaterinburg, Russia

Guilin

- Hạ Long, Vietnam
- Hastings, New Zealand
- Hévíz, Hungary
- Jeju City, South Korea
- Kakogawa, Japan
- Kumamoto, Japan
- Muratpaşa, Turkey
- Orlando, United States
- Târgoviște, Romania
- Toruń, Poland

Guiyang

- Fort Worth, United States
- (Republic of Ireland) County Meath, Ireland
- Palmerston North, New Zealand
- Rio de Janeiro, Brazil
- Vicenza, Italy

== H ==
Haikou

- Åland, Finland
- Antalya, Turkey
- Chornomorsk, Ukraine
- Darwin, Australia
- Donghae, South Korea
- Faiyum, Egypt
- Faro, Portugal
- Gdynia, Poland
- Haeundae (Busan), South Korea
- Honolulu, United States
- Islamabad, Pakistan
- Krabi, Thailand
- Lahore, Pakistan
- Malacca City, Malaysia
- Modi'in-Maccabim-Re'ut, Israel
- Nanaimo, Canada
- Oklahoma City, United States
- Perth, Scotland, United Kingdom
- Pisa Province, Italy
- Qazvin, Iran
- Scottsdale, United States
- Tagaytay, Philippines
- Victoria, Seychelles
- Vladimir, Russia
- (Republic of Ireland) Waterford, Ireland
- Whangarei, New Zealand
- Yangon, Myanmar
- Zanzibar City, Tanzania

Hami

- Nyūzen, Japan

Handan

- Dubuque, United States
- Inari, Finland
- Padua, Italy
- Saiki, Japan

Hangzhou

- Agadir, Morocco
- Baguio, Philippines
- Beit Shemesh, Israel
- Benito Juárez, Mexico
- Boston, United States
- El Calafate, Argentina
- Cape Town, South Africa
- Curitiba, Brazil
- Dresden, Germany
- Fukui, Japan
- Gifu, Japan
- Greenwich, United States
- Hamamatsu, Japan
- Heidelberg, Germany
- Indianapolis, United States
- Kazan, Russia
- Kota Kinabalu, Malaysia
- Leeds, England, United Kingdom
- Lugano, Switzerland
- Maribor, Slovenia
- Montego Bay, Jamaica
- Nadi, Fiji
- Nice, France
- Oviedo, Spain
- Oulu, Finland
- (Suriname) Paramaribo, Surinam
- Pisa, Italy
- Seogwipo, South Korea
- Split, Croatia
- Yeosu, South Korea

Hangzhou – Fuyang

- Riverbank, United States

Hangzhou – Xiaoshan

- Yamanashi, Japan

Harbin

- Aarhus, Denmark
- Arras (communauté), France
- Asahikawa, Japan
- Bucheon, South Korea
- Cagayan de Oro, Philippines
- Chalandri, Greece
- Chiang Mai, Thailand
- Daugavpils, Latvia
- Edmonton, Canada
- Ekurhuleni, South Africa
- Erzurum, Turkey
- Fairfax County, United States
- Givatayim, Israel
- Gomel, Belarus
- Griffith, Australia
- Khabarovsk, Russia
- Krasnodar, Russia
- Magdeburg, Germany
- Minneapolis, United States
- Murmansk, Russia
- Niigata, Japan
- Nyíregyháza, Hungary
- Ploiești, Romania
- Punta Arenas, Chile
- Riccione, Italy
- Rokiškis, Lithuania
- Rovaniemi, Finland
- Salvador, Brazil
- South Taranaki, New Zealand
- Sunderland, England, United Kingdom
- Sverdlovsk Oblast, Russia
- Užice, Serbia
- Vitebsk, Belarus
- Vladivostok, Russia
- Wiener Neustadt, Austria
- Yakutsk, Russia

Harbin – Daoli

- Pervouralsk, Russia

Hefei

- Aalborg, Denmark
- Belfast, Northern Ireland, United Kingdom
- Bujumbura, Burundi
- Columbus, United States
- Darebin, Australia
- Freetown, Sierra Leone
- Kurume, Japan
- Lleida, Spain
- Nizhny Novgorod, Russia
- Osnabrück, Germany
- Phnom Penh, Cambodia
- Ufa, Russia
- Wonju, South Korea

Hegang

- Birobidzhan, Russia

Heihe

- Blagoveshchensk, Russia
- Krasnoyarsk, Russia
- Yakutsk, Russia

Hengshui

- Tillsonburg, Canada
- Tultitlán, Mexico

Huai'an

- Cuenca, Ecuador
- Gomel, Belarus
- Kolpino (Saint Petersburg), Russia
- Magnitogorsk, Russia
- Oakville, Canada
- Płock, Poland
- Sassnitz, Germany
- Wanju, South Korea
- Yorba Linda, United States

Huaibei

- Ruse, Bulgaria
- Ub, Serbia

Huainan

- Barra Mansa, Brazil
- Bergamo, Italy
- Settsu, Japan
- Szolnok, Hungary
- Tameside, England, United Kingdom

Huangshan

- Dong (Daegu), South Korea
- Fujiidera, Japan
- Interlaken, Switzerland
- Serravalle, San Marino
- Stralsund, Germany

Huizhou

- Milpitas, United States
- North Vancouver, Canada

Hulunbuir

- Chita, Russia
- Ulan-Ude, Russia

Hulunbuir – Hailar

- Chinggis City, Mongolia
- Chita, Russia

== J ==
Jiamusi

- Avellino Province, Italy
- Donghae, South Korea
- Komsomolsk-on-Amur, Russia
- Nirasaki, Japan
- Shoalhaven, Australia

Jiangmen

- Kota Kinabalu, Malaysia
- Lautoka, Fiji
- Maia, Portugal
- Riverside, United States

Jiangyin

- Alameda, United States
- Belo Horizonte, Brazil
- Faaa, French Polynesia
- Fujioka, Japan

Jiaxing

- Bunbury, Australia
- Fuji, Japan
- Gangneung, South Korea
- Halle, Germany
- Imatra, Finland
- Rebild, Denmark

Jilin City

- Mangyongdae (Pyongyang), North Korea
- Matsue, Japan
- Nakhodka, Russia
- Prince Albert, Canada
- Spokane, United States
- Volgograd, Russia
- Yamagata, Japan

Jinan

- Arba Minch, Ethiopia
- Augsburg, Germany
- Civitavecchia, Italy
- Coventry, England, United Kingdom
- Joondalup, Australia
- Kazanlak, Bulgaria
- Kfar Saba, Israel
- Kharkiv, Ukraine
- Marmaris, Turkey
- Nagpur, India
- Nizhny Novgorod, Russia
- Port Moresby, Papua New Guinea
- Porto Velho, Brazil
- Praia, Cape Verde
- Regina, Canada
- Rennes, France
- Sacramento, United States
- Savyetski District (Minsk), Belarus
- Sidoarjo, Indonesia
- Suwon, South Korea
- Vantaa, Finland
- Vitebsk, Belarus
- Wakayama, Japan
- Yamaguchi, Japan
- Zapopan, Mexico

Jinan – Zhangqiu

- Yanai, Japan

Jining

- Angra do Heroísmo, Portugal
- Ashikaga, Japan
- Komatsu, Japan
- Lahore, Pakistan
- Mulhouse, France
- Nonsan, South Korea
- Osasco, Brazil
- Passi, Philippines
- Seo (Busan), South Korea
- Springfield, United States
- Suseong (Daegu), South Korea
- Taganrog, Russia
- Tete, Mozambique
- Tokmok, Kyrgyzstan
- Yeongju, South Korea

Jiujiang

- Baw Baw, Australia
- Chios, Greece
- Jeongseon, South Korea
- Kajaani, Finland
- Koper, Slovenia
- Legionowo, Poland
- Louisville, United States
- La Plata, Argentina
- Queimados, Brazil
- Redbridge, England, United Kingdom
- Savannah, United States
- Serowe, Botswana
- Tamano, Japan

Jixi

- Novosibirsky District, Russia
- Samcheok, South Korea

== K ==
Kaifeng

- Florida, Uruguay
- Kiryat Motzkin, Israel
- Omsk, Russia
- Toda, Japan
- Wichita, United States
- Wingecarribee, Australia
- Yeongcheon, South Korea

Kaili

- Kartuzy, Poland
- Karviná, Czech Republic

Karamay

- Aktobe, Kazakhstan
- Iskitim, Russia

Kashgar

- Abbottabad, Pakistan
- Gorno-Badakhshan, Tajikistan
- Osh Region, Kyrgyzstan

Kunming

- Antalya, Turkey
- Chefchaouen, Morocco
- Chiang Mai, Thailand
- Chittagong, Bangladesh
- Cochabamba, Bolivia
- Da Nang, Vietnam
- Denver, United States
- Dietzenbach, Germany
- Fujisawa, Japan
- Kolkata, India
- Kuching, Malaysia
- Mandalay, Myanmar
- Nairobi, Kenya
- Nancy, France
- New Plymouth, New Zealand
- Olomouc, Czech Republic
- Phnom Penh, Cambodia
- Pokhara, Nepal
- Polonnaruwa, Sri Lanka
- Schenectady, United States
- Takayama, Japan
- Vientiane, Laos
- Wagga Wagga, Australia
- Yangon, Myanmar
- Zurich, Switzerland

Kunshan

- Durham, United States
- Grootfontein, Namibia
- Hyvinkää, Finland
- South El Monte, United States
- Tatebayashi, Japan

== L ==
Lanzhou

- Akita, Japan
- Alba Iulia, Romania
- Albay, Philippines
- Albuquerque, United States
- Ashgabat, Turkmenistan
- Chorley, England, United Kingdom
- Fier, Albania
- Hilltops, Australia
- Leskovac, Serbia
- Nouakchott, Mauritania
- Osh, Kyrgyzstan
- Penza, Russia
- Tsumeb, Namibia
- Ulan-Ude, Russia

Leshan

- Fraser Coast, Australia
- Gilbert, United States
- Ichikawa, Japan
- Issy-les-Moulineaux, France
- Prachuap Khiri Khan, Thailand

Lhasa

- Boulder, United States
- Elista, Russia
- Kathmandu, Nepal

Lianjiang

- Samborondón, Ecuador

Lianyungang

- Bishkek, Kyrgyzstan
- Greater Geelong, Australia
- Mokpo, South Korea
- Napier, New Zealand
- Sabadell, Spain
- Saga, Japan
- Sakai, Japan
- Volzhsky, Russia

Lijiang

- Greater Shepparton, Australia
- Malibu, United States
- New Westminster, Canada
- Roanoke, United States
- Takayama, Japan
- Zermatt, Switzerland

Liuzhou

- Bandung, Indonesia
- Cincinnati, United States
- Dar es Salaam, Tanzania
- Muntinlupa, Philippines
- N'Djamena, Chad
- Passau, Germany
- Rayong, Thailand
- Stalowa Wola, Poland
- Vĩnh Yên, Vietnam

Lu'an

- Varkaus, Finland

Luoyang

- Buyeo, South Korea
- Kashihara, Japan
- La Crosse, United States
- Okayama, Japan
- Sukagawa, Japan
- Tolyatti, Russia
- Tours, France

Luzhou

- Herne, Germany
- Kabwe, Zambia

== M ==
Ma'anshan

- Arganda del Rey, Spain
- Changwon, South Korea
- Galesburg, United States
- Hamilton, Canada
- Isesaki, Japan
- Tlalnepantla de Baz, Mexico
- Zapala, Argentina

Macau

- Coimbra, Portugal
- Lisbon, Portugal
- Porto, Portugal
- Praia, Cape Verde
- São Paulo, Brazil

Meishan

- Klin, Russia
- Nizhnekamsk, Russia

Mianyang

- Novosibirsk, Russia
- Obninsk, Russia
- Shōbara, Japan

Mingguang

- Sainte-Adèle, Canada

Mudanjiang

- Jyväskylä, Finland
- Ōtsu, Japan
- Paju, South Korea
- Ussuriysk, Russia

== N ==
Nanchang

- Albacete, Spain
- (Georgia (country)) Kutaisi, Georgia
- Lincoln, England, United Kingdom
- Newcastle, South Africa
- Olympia, United States
- Orsha, Belarus
- Quilmes, Argentina
- Skopje, North Macedonia
- Sorocaba, Brazil
- Takamatsu, Japan
- Toluca, Mexico
- Ufa, Russia
- Valkeakoski, Finland

Nanchong

- Toledo, United States

Nanjing

- Bandar Seri Begawan, Brunei
- Barranquilla, Colombia
- Bloemfontein, South Africa
- Concepción, Chile
- Daejeon, South Korea
- Eindhoven, Netherlands
- Florence, Italy
- Leipzig, Germany
- Limassol, Cyprus
- London, Canada
- Lusaka, Zambia
- Malacca City, Malaysia
- Mexicali, Mexico
- Mogilev, Belarus
- Perth, Australia
- San Marino, San Marino
- Shiraz, Iran
- St. Louis, United States
- Windhoek, Namibia
- Yaroslavl, Russia
- York, England, United Kingdom

Nanning

- Antananarivo, Madagascar
- (The Gambia) Banjul, Gambia
- Bogor, Indonesia
- Bundaberg, Australia
- Champasak, Laos
- Commerce City, United States
- Crema, Italy
- Davao City, Philippines
- Grudziądz, Poland
- Gwacheon, South Korea
- Haiphong, Vietnam
- Iquique, Chile
- Ivano-Frankivsk, Ukraine
- Khon Kaen, Thailand
- Klagenfurt, Austria
- Lilongwe, Malawi
- Provo, United States
- Sihanoukville, Cambodia
- Val-de-Marne, France
- Yangon, Myanmar

Ningbo

- Aachen, Germany
- Cluj-Napoca, Romania
- Daegu, South Korea
- Bydgoszcz, Poland
- Marrakesh, Morocco
- Nagaokakyō, Japan
- Nelson Mandela Bay, South Africa
- Nottingham, England, United Kingdom
- Prijedor, Bosnia and Herzegovina
- Rouen, France
- Santos, Brazil
- Varna, Bulgaria
- Ventspils, Latvia
- Victoria de Durango, Mexico
- Wilmington, United States

== P ==
Pengzhou

- Ipswich, Australia
- Ishikari, Japan
- Mataram, Indonesia
- Mürzzuschlag, Austria

Pinghu

- Watsonville, United States

== Q ==
Qingdao

- Acapulco, Mexico
- Adelaide, Australia
- Antalya, Turkey
- Bilbao, Spain
- Daegu, South Korea
- Dushanbe, Tajikistan
- Faisalabad, Pakistan
- Frederikshavn, Denmark
- Grand Port, Mauritius
- Hyderabad, India
- Iloilo City, Philippines
- Long Beach, United States
- Makassar, Indonesia
- Mannheim, Germany
- Nantes, France
- Ness Ziona, Israel
- Novorossiysk, Russia
- Odesa, Ukraine
- Oldenburg, Germany
- Orsha, Belarus
- Paderborn, Germany
- Pattaya, Thailand
- Perm, Russia
- Puerto Montt, Chile
- Ramat Gan, Israel
- Regensburg, Germany
- Rijeka, Croatia
- Saint Petersburg, Russia
- Salo, Finland
- Shimonoseki, Japan
- Southampton, England, United Kingdom
- Thousand Oaks, United States
- Velsen, Netherlands
- Vigo, Spain
- Vila Velha, Brazil

Qiqihar

- Goyang, South Korea
- Mariupol, Ukraine
- New Castle County, United States
- Ufa, Russia
- Utsunomiya, Japan

Qitaihe

- Artyom, Russia
- Jeungpyeong, South Korea

Quanzhou

- Hérault, France
- Holbæk, Denmark
- Iloilo City, Philippines
- Kuching, Malaysia
- Maykop, Russia
- Monterey Park, United States
- Neustadt an der Weinstraße, Germany
- Urasoe, Japan

Quzhou

- Red Wing, United States
- Sano, Japan
- Sumgait, Azerbaijan

== S ==
Sanmenxia

- Dongducheon, South Korea
- Kitakami, Japan
- Kostroma, Russia
- Murray Bridge, Australia
- Szolnok, Hungary
- Zabok, Croatia

Sanya

- Alhambra, United States
- Benito Juárez, Mexico
- Blackpool, England, United Kingdom
- Cannes, France
- Dubrovnik, Croatia
- Khabarovsk, Russia
- Kuusamo, Finland
- Lapu-Lapu, Philippines
- Maui County, United States
- Sal, Cape Verde
- Viareggio, Italy
- Yalta, Ukraine

Shanghai

- Aden, Yemen
- Alexandria, Egypt
- Antwerp, Belgium
- Auvergne-Rhône-Alpes, France
- Bangkok, Thailand
- Barcelona, Spain
- Basel, Switzerland
- Belgrade, Serbia
- Bratislava Region, Slovakia
- Budapest, Hungary
- Busan, South Korea
- Casablanca, Morocco
- Central Denmark Region, Denmark
- Colombo, Sri Lanka
- Constanța, Romania
- (Republic of Ireland) Cork, Ireland
- Chiang Mai Province, Thailand
- Chicago, United States
- Dubai, United Arab Emirates
- Dunedin, New Zealand
- East Java, Indonesia
- Espoo, Finland
- Guayaquil, Ecuador
- Haifa, Israel
- Hamburg, Germany
- Hamhung, North Korea
- Ho Chi Minh City, Vietnam
- Houston, United States
- Istanbul, Turkey
- Jakarta, Indonesia
- Jalisco, Mexico
- Karachi, Pakistan
- KwaZulu-Natal, South Africa
- Lima, Peru
- Liverpool, England, United Kingdom
- London, England, United Kingdom
- Maputo, Mozambique
- Marseille, France
- Metro Manila, Philippines
- Milan, Italy
- Minsk, Belarus
- Montreal, Canada
- Mumbai, India
- Osaka, Japan
- Osaka Prefecture, Japan
- Phnom Penh, Cambodia
- Piraeus, Greece
- Pomeranian Voivodeship, Poland
- Port Vila, Vanuatu
- Porto, Portugal
- Quebec, Canada
- Queensland, Australia
- Rosario, Argentina
- Rotterdam, Netherlands
- Saint Petersburg, Russia
- Salzburg, Austria
- San Francisco, United States
- Santiago de Cuba Province, Cuba
- São Paulo, Brazil
- Sofia, Bulgaria
- Tabriz, Iran
- Tashkent, Uzbekistan
- Valparaíso, Chile
- Windhoek, Namibia
- Yokohama, Japan
- Zagreb, Croatia

Shantou

- Cần Thơ, Vietnam
- Haifa, Israel
- Kishiwada, Japan
- Saint John, Canada

Shaoxing

- Belém, Brazil
- Cape Girardeau, United States
- Fujinomiya, Japan
- Leninsky District, Russia
- Nishinomiya, Japan
- Odense, Denmark
- Yongsan (Seoul), South Korea

Shenyang

- Belfast, Northern Ireland, United Kingdom
- Chicago, United States
- Daejeon, South Korea
- Florida, Uruguay
- Incheon, South Korea
- Irkutsk, Russia
- Jinja, Uganda
- Katowice, Poland
- Karachi, Pakistan
- Kawasaki, Japan
- Monterrey, Mexico
- Novosibirsk, Russia
- La Plata, Argentina
- Quezon City, Philippines
- Ramat Gan, Israel
- Sapporo, Japan
- Seongnam, South Korea
- Turin, Italy
- Ufa, Russia
- Yaoundé, Cameroon

Shenzhen

- Almere, Netherlands
- Apia, Samoa
- Canton of Bern, Switzerland
- Bishkek, Kyrgyzstan
- Brisbane, Australia
- Edinburgh, Scotland, United Kingdom
- Gwangyang, South Korea
- Haifa, Israel
- Houston, United States
- Kingston, Jamaica
- Lomé, Togo
- Luxor, Egypt
- Minsk, Belarus
- Nuremberg, Germany
- Phnom Penh, Cambodia
- Plovdiv, Bulgaria
- Porto, Portugal
- Poznań, Poland
- Tsukuba, Japan
- Walloon Brabant, Belgium

Shihezi

- East Gwillimbury, Canada
- Multan, Pakistan

Shijiazhuang

- Cheonan, South Korea
- Corby, England, United Kingdom
- Des Moines, United States
- Dire Dawa, Ethiopia
- Nagano, Japan
- Nagykanizsa, Hungary
- Osh, Kyrgyzstan
- Parma, Italy
- Querétaro, Mexico
- Richmond Hill, Canada
- Saskatoon, Canada

Shuangyashan

- Magadan, Russia
- Nagai, Japan

Suining

- Kırklareli, Turkey

Suzhou, Anhui

- Padang, Indonesia

Suzhou, Jiangsu

- Antananarivo, Madagascar
- Esbjerg, Denmark
- Grenoble, France
- Ikeda, Japan
- Ismailia, Egypt
- Jeonju, South Korea
- Kanazawa, Japan
- Konstanz, Germany
- Logan, Australia
- Malé, Maldives
- Nijmegen, Netherlands
- Nowy Sącz, Poland
- (Republic of the Congo) Pointe-Noire, Congo
- Portland, United States
- Porto Alegre, Brazil
- Riga, Latvia
- Taupō, New Zealand
- Tulcea County, Romania
- Venice, Italy
- Victoria, Canada
- West Flanders, Belgium
- Windhoek, Namibia

Suzhou – Gusu

- Santa Luċija, Malta

Suzhou – Wujiang

- Bourgoin-Jallieu, France
- Chiba, Japan
- Dubbo, Australia
- Hwaseong, South Korea
- Marlboro, United States
- Mogale, South Africa
- Südwestpfalz, Germany
- Uchinada, Japan

Suzhou – Wuzhong

- Riesa, Germany
- Rotorua Lakes, New Zealand
- Southlake, United States

== T ==
Tacheng

- Oskemen, Kazakhstan
- Rubtsovsk, Russia

Taicang

- Jülich, Germany
- Rosolina, Italy
- Wirral, England, United Kingdom

Taiyuan

- Chemnitz, Germany
- Donetsk, Ukraine
- Douala, Cameroon
- Himeji, Japan
- Launceston, Australia
- Nashville, United States
- Newcastle upon Tyne, England, United Kingdom
- Saint-Denis, Réunion, France
- Suncheon, South Korea
- Syktyvkar, Russia

Taizhou, Jiangsu

- Arcadia, United States
- Broken Hill, Australia
- Eumseong, South Korea
- Hutt, New Zealand
- Kotka, Finland
- Latrobe, Australia
- Newport News, United States
- Pavia Province, Italy
- Zaragoza, Spain

Taizhou, Zhejiang

- Fort Wayne, United States
- Hanau, Germany
- Iquique, Chile
- Muan, South Korea
- Nevers, France
- Tsuruga, Japan

Tang

- Gravenhurst, Canada

Tianjin

- Abidjan, Ivory Coast
- Bishkek, Kyrgyzstan
- Chiba, Japan
- East Java, Indonesia
- Groningen, Netherlands
- Haiphong, Vietnam
- Incheon, South Korea
- Islamabad, Pakistan
- İzmir, Turkey
- Jönköping, Sweden
- Karachi, Pakistan
- Kharkiv, Ukraine
- Kobe, Japan
- Łódź, Poland
- Lombardy, Italy
- Melbourne, Australia
- Métropole Rouen Normandie, France
- Nord-Pas-de-Calais, France
- Orange County, United States
- Philadelphia, United States
- Plovdiv Province, Bulgaria
- Réunion, France
- Rio de Janeiro, Brazil
- Saarland, Germany
- Sarajevo, Bosnia and Herzegovina
- Yokkaichi, Japan

Tongling

- Antofagasta, Chile
- Halton, England, United Kingdom
- Skellefteå, Sweden

== U ==
Ürümqi

- Almaty, Kazakhstan
- Antalya, Turkey
- Aqaba, Jordan
- (Georgia (country)) Batumi, Georgia
- Bishkek, Kyrgyzstan
- Chelyabinsk, Russia
- Dushanbe, Tajikistan
- Karachi, Pakistan
- Klang, Malaysia
- Mashhad, Iran
- Nakhchivan, Azerbaijan
- Narrandera, Australia
- Omsk, Russia
- Orem, United States
- Peshawar, Pakistan

== W ==
Weihai

- Biella, Italy
- Cheltenham, England, United Kingdom
- Nampo, North Korea
- Santa Barbara, United States
- Sochi, Russia
- Sousse, Tunisia
- Timaru, New Zealand
- Ube, Japan
- Yeosu, South Korea

Weinan

- Komsomolsk-on-Amur, Russia
- Szeged, Hungary

Wenzhou

- Alicante, Spain
- Alsergrund (Vienna), Austria
- Ambato, Ecuador
- Giessen, Germany
- Gumi, South Korea
- Ipswich, Australia
- Ipswich, England, United Kingdom
- Ishinomaki, Japan
- Kumasi, Ghana
- Kure, Japan
- Lucknow, India
- Port-Gentil, Gabon
- Prato Province, Italy
- Slagelse, Denmark
- Union County, United States
- Vallensbæk, Denmark
- Walvis Bay, Namibia

Wuhan

- Ashdod, Israel
- Bangkok, Thailand
- Bishkek, Kyrgyzstan
- Bordeaux, France
- Chalcis, Greece
- Cheongju, South Korea
- Christchurch, New Zealand
- Concepción, Chile
- Duisburg, Germany
- Entebbe, Uganda
- Essonne, France
- Galați, Romania
- Győr, Hungary
- Iloilo City, Philippines
- Izhevsk, Russia
- İzmir, Turkey
- Khartoum, Sudan
- Kyiv, Ukraine
- Kópavogur, Iceland
- Manchester, England, United Kingdom
- Markham, Canada
- Ōita, Japan
- Pittsburgh, United States
- Sankt Pölten, Austria
- Saratov, Russia
- Swansea, Wales, United Kingdom
- Tijuana, Mexico

Wuhu

- Kōchi, Japan
- Torrejón de Ardoz, Spain
- Ulyanovsk, Russia

Wuxi

- Akashi, Japan
- Cascais, Portugal
- Chattanooga, United States
- Chelmsford, England, United Kingdom
- Fez, Morocco
- Frankston, Australia
- Fredericton, Canada
- Gimhae, South Korea
- Hamilton, New Zealand
- Lahti, Finland
- Leverkusen, Germany
- Patras, Greece
- Puebla, Mexico
- Puerto Princesa, Philippines
- Sagamihara, Japan
- San Antonio, United States
- Sihanoukville, Cambodia
- Södertälje, Sweden
- Sorocaba, Brazil
- Tiberias, Israel
- Ulsan, South Korea
- Viña del Mar, Chile
- Zielona Góra, Poland

Wuxi – Binhu

- Araçariguama, Brazil
- Castelldefels, Spain
- Matsusaka, Japan
- Norwich, United States

Wuxi – Huishan

- Davis, United States
- Ratingen, Germany
- Ulju, South Korea
- Zacatecas, Mexico

Wuxi – Xinwu

- Toyokawa, Japan

Wuxi – Xishan

- West Orange, United States

== X ==
Xi'an

- Andong, South Korea
- Brasília, Brazil
- Córdoba, Argentina
- Cuenca, Ecuador
- Dnipro, Ukraine
- Dortmund, Germany
- Edinburgh, Scotland, United Kingdom
- Ercolano, Italy
- Fez, Morocco
- Funabashi, Japan
- Groningen, Netherlands
- Gyeongju, South Korea
- Gyumri, Armenia
- Iași, Romania
- Isfahan, Iran
- Jinju, South Korea
- Kalamata, Greece
- Kansas City, United States
- Kathmandu, Nepal
- Konya, Turkey
- Kotor, Montenegro
- Kragujevac, Serbia
- Kyoto, Japan
- Lahore, Pakistan
- Mary, Turkmenistan
- Montgomery County, United States
- Multan, Pakistan
- Nara, Japan
- Oldenburg, Germany
- Osh, Kyrgyzstan
- Pau, France
- Pompei, Italy
- Quebec City, Canada
- Samarkand, Uzbekistan
- Valencia, Spain

Xiamen

- Baltimore, United States
- Belgrade, Serbia
- Cardiff, Wales, United Kingdom
- Cebu City, Philippines
- Dushanbe, Tajikistan
- Guadalajara, Mexico
- İzmir, Turkey
- Kaunas, Lithuania
- Marathon, Greece
- Mokpo, South Korea
- Netanya, Israel
- Nice, France
- Penang Island, Malaysia
- Phuket, Thailand
- Richmond, Canada
- Sasebo, Japan
- Sunshine Coast, Australia
- Surabaya, Indonesia
- Trier, Germany
- Wellington, New Zealand
- Zoetermeer, Netherlands

Xiamen – Siming

- Sarasota, United States

Xianyang

- Le Mans, France
- Merri-bek, Australia
- Narita, Japan
- Rochester, United States
- Uiseong, South Korea
- Uji, Japan

Xining

- Antalya, Turkey
- Edirne, Turkey
- Izhevsk, Russia
- Jung (Daejeon), South Korea
- Lalitpur, Nepal
- Osh, Kyrgyzstan
- Utah County, United States

Xinxiang

- Itajaí, Brazil
- Kashiwara, Japan

Xuancheng

- Shikokuchūō, Japan

Xuzhou

- Érd, Hungary
- Erfurt, Germany
- Greater Dandenong, Australia
- Handa, Japan
- Jeongeup, South Korea
- Leoben, Austria
- Mežica, Slovenia
- Newark, United States
- Osasco, Brazil
- Ryazan, Russia
- Saint-Étienne, France

== Y ==
Yangquan

- Chesterfield, England, United Kingdom
- Pleven, Bulgaria
- Ratchaburi, Thailand

Yangzhou

- Atsugi, Japan
- Attleboro, United States
- Balashikha, Russia
- Breda, Netherlands
- Colchester, England, United Kingdom
- Karatsu, Japan
- Kent, United States
- Konya, Turkey
- Korčula, Croatia
- Luxor, Egypt
- Nara, Japan
- Neubrandenburg, Germany
- Offenbach am Main, Germany
- Orléans, France
- Rimini, Italy
- Southern Grampians, Australia
- Vaughan, Canada
- Vlorë, Albania
- Westport, United States
- Yangon, Myanmar
- Yongin, South Korea

Yantai

- Angers, France
- Angus, Scotland, United Kingdom
- Beppu, Japan
- Burgas, Bulgaria
- Gunsan, South Korea
- Isaac, Australia
- Kingston, Jamaica
- Mackay, Australia
- Miskolc, Hungary
- Omaha, United States
- Phuket, Thailand
- Quimper, France
- San Diego, United States
- Szombathely, Hungary
- Tauranga, New Zealand
- Whitsunday, Australia
- Zrenjanin, Serbia

Yantai – Penglai

- Cartaxo, Portugal
- Leiria, Portugal
- Salaberry-de-Valleyfield, Canada
- Sonoma, United States

Yibin

- Columbia, United States

Yichang

- Foz do Iguaçu, Brazil
- Třebíč, Czech Republic
- Valenciennes, France
- Washington County, United States
- Zaporizhzhia, Ukraine

Yichun

- Azuga, Romania
- Bad Wildungen, Germany
- Birobidzhan, Russia
- Camrose, Canada

Yinchuan

- Bourg-en-Bresse, France
- Bishkek, Kyrgyzstan
- Eilat, Israel
- İlkadım, Turkey
- Matsue, Japan
- Montana, Bulgaria
- Outapi, Namibia
- Port Vila, Vanuatu
- Settat, Morocco
- Suceava, Romania
- Ulaanbaatar, Mongolia

Yixing

- Hayward, United States
- Mungyeong, South Korea
- Novo Mesto, Slovenia
- Sanford, United States

Yueyang

- Akabira, Japan
- Castlegar, Canada
- Cockburn, Australia
- Numazu, Japan
- Stara Zagora, Bulgaria
- Titusville, United States

Yuyao

- Hitachiōta, Japan
- Walnut, United States

== Z ==
Zhangjiagang

- Glenelg, Australia
- Marshfield, United States
- Marugame, Japan
- Redondo Beach, United States
- Vyazma, Russia

Zhangjiakou

- Chambéry, France
- Kranj, Slovenia
- Lahti, Finland
- Skövde, Sweden
- South Tyrol, Italy

Zhanjiang

- Atlantic City, United States
- Cairns, Australia
- Greater Geraldton, Australia
- iLembe, South Africa
- Portsmouth, England, United Kingdom
- Serpukhov, Russia

Zhangzhou

- Date, Japan
- Gödöllő, Hungary
- Honolulu, United States
- Isahaya, Japan
- Palembang, Indonesia
- Wageningen, Netherlands

Zhengzhou

- Cluj-Napoca, Romania
- Irbid, Jordan
- Joinville, Brazil
- Mariental, Namibia
- Mogilev, Belarus
- Ouagadougou, Burkina Faso
- Richmond, United States
- Saitama, Japan
- Samara, Russia
- Shumen, Bulgaria

Zhenjiang

- Bergerac (communauté), France
- Fairfield, Australia
- Iksan, South Korea
- Kiskőrös, Hungary
- Kurashiki, Japan
- Londrina, Brazil
- Mannheim, Germany
- Mikhaylovsk, Russia
- Seo (Busan), South Korea
- Shibata, Japan
- Stavropol, Russia
- Tempe, United States
- Tsu, Japan

Zhongshan

- Burnaby, Canada
- Honolulu, United States
- Rull, Federated States of Micronesia

Zhuhai

- Atami, Japan
- Braunschweig, Germany
- Castelo Branco, Portugal
- Gold Coast, Australia
- Gwadar District, Pakistan
- Halifax, Canada
- Luganville, Vanuatu
- Providence, United States
- Redwood City, United States
- La Spezia, Italy
- Surrey, Canada
- Vitória, Brazil
- Zhukovsky, Russia

Zhuzhou

- Durham, United States
- Vanadzor, Armenia

Zibo

- Bergamo Province, Italy
- Bratsk, Russia
- Erie, United States
- Kamo, Japan
- Mandaue, Philippines
- Newcastle, South Africa
- São José dos Pinhais, Brazil
- Veliky Novgorod, Russia

Zigong

- Goseong, South Korea
