= List of cities in Yamanashi Prefecture by population =

The following list sorts all cities (including towns and villages) in the Japanese prefecture of Yamanashi with a population of more than 5,000 according to the 2020 Census. As of October 1, 2020, 21 places fulfill this criterion and are listed here. This list refers only to the population of individual cities, towns and villages within their defined limits, which does not include other municipalities or suburban areas within urban agglomerations.

== List ==
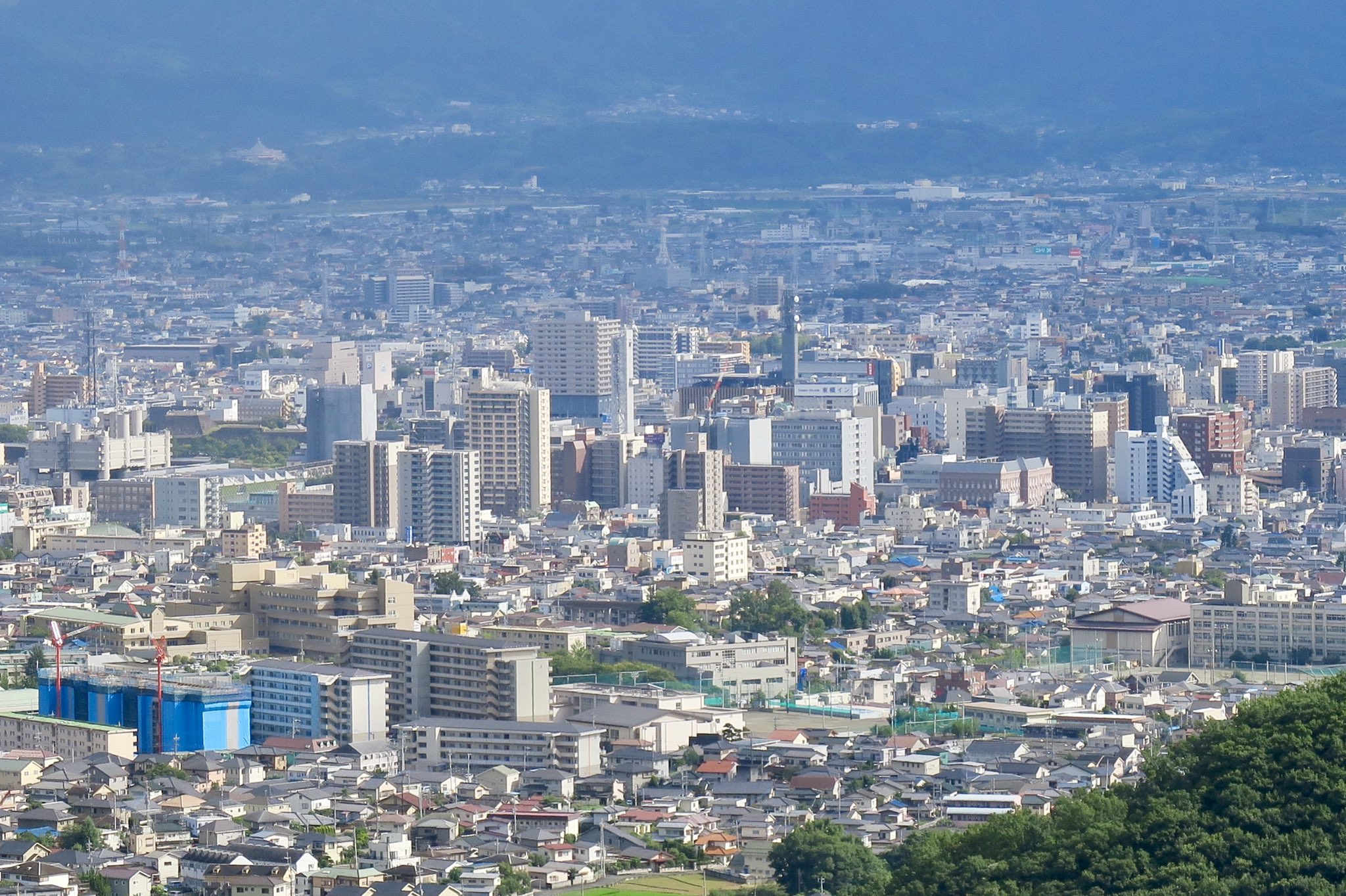
01.Kōfu

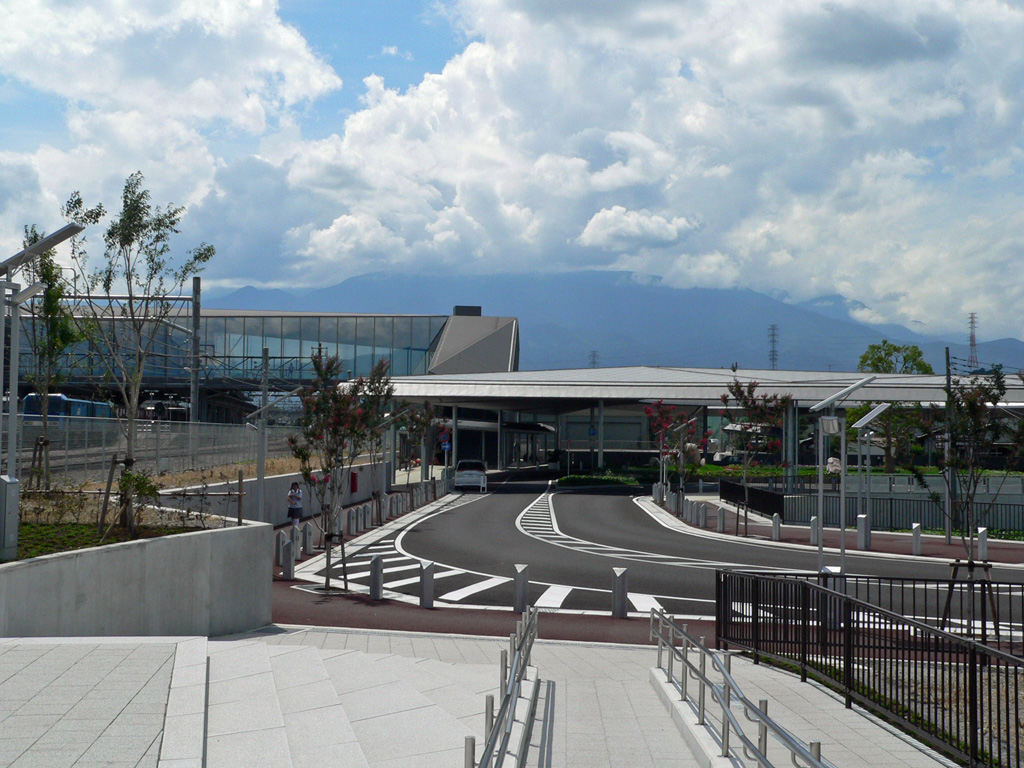
02.Kai

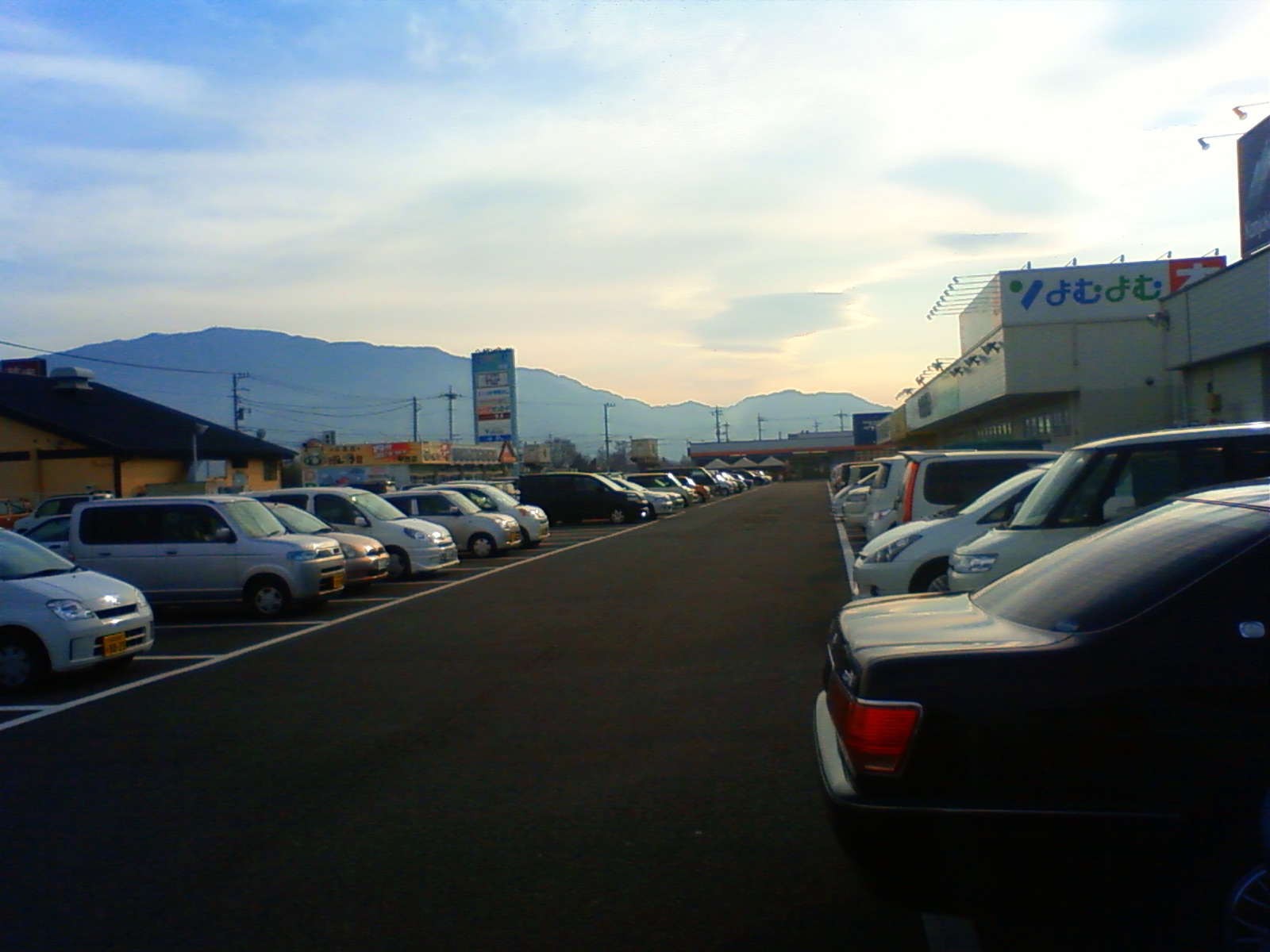
03.Minamiarupusu

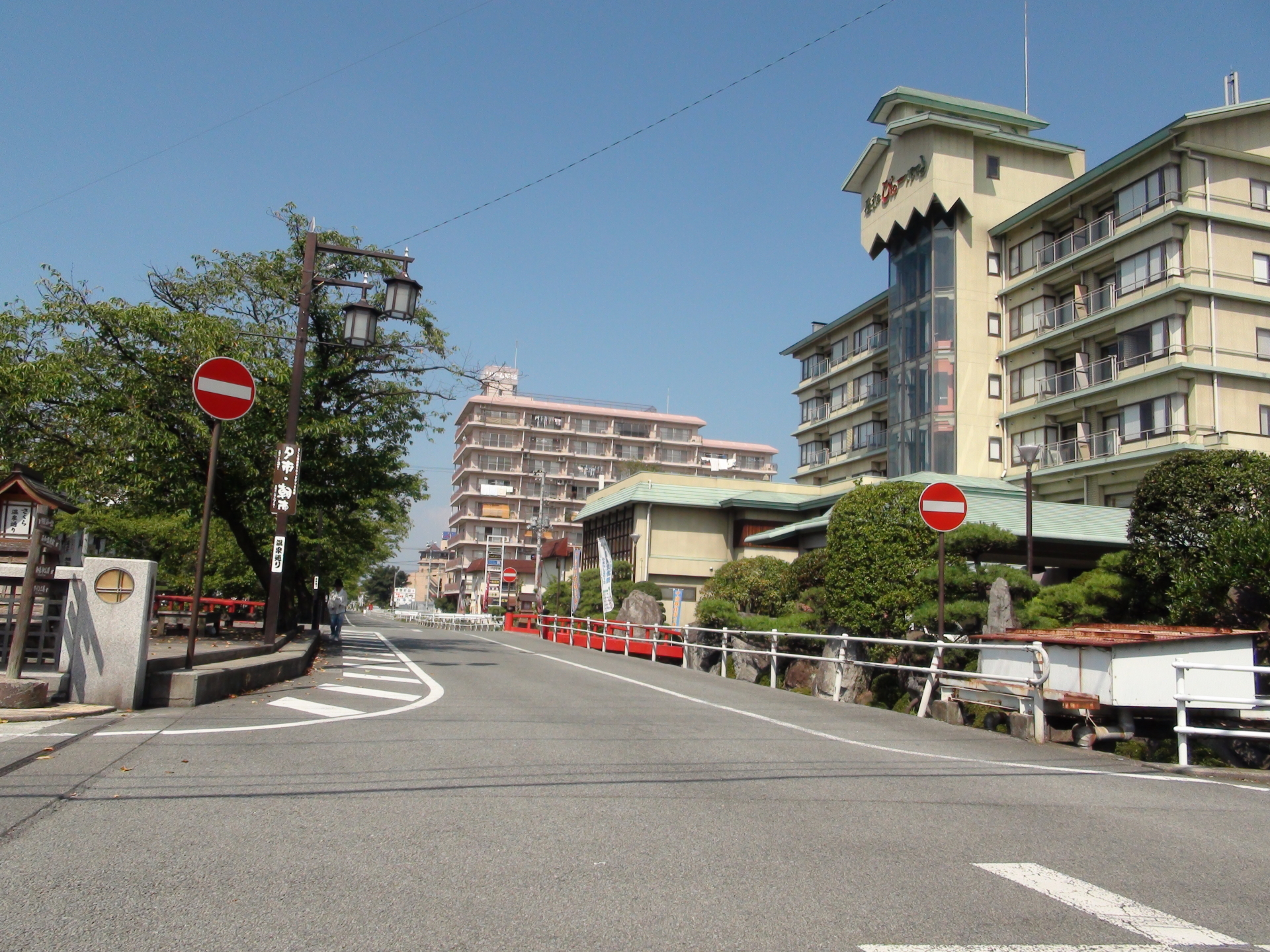
04.Fuefuki

The following table lists the 21 cities, villages and towns in Yamanashi with a population of at least 5,000 on October 1, 2020, according to the 2020 Census. The table also gives an overview of the evolution of the population since the 1995 census.

Rank (2020)	Name	Status	2020	2015	2010	2005	2000	1995
1	Kōfu	City	189,742	193,125	198,992	200,096	202,120	206,838
2	Kai	City	75,343	74,386	73,807	74,062	71,706	66,628
3	Minamiarupusu	City	69,494	70,828	72,635	72,055	70,116	67,504
4	Fuefuki	City	66,979	69,559	70,529	71,711	71,025	66,839
5	Fujiyoshida	City	46,552	49,003	50,619	52,572	54,090	54,691
6	Hokuto	City	44,096	45,111	46,968	48,144	47,888	47,318
7	Yamanashi	City	33,465	35,141	36,832	38,686	39,797	39,521
8	Chūō	City	31,235	31,124	31,322	31,650	30,769	28,543
9	Tsuru	City	31,023	32,002	33,588	35,017	35,513	35,398
10	Kōshū	City	29,259	31,671	33,927	35,922	36,925	38,046
11	Nirasaki	City	29,082	30,680	32,477	33,801	32,707	32,097
12	Fujikawaguchiko	Town	26,084	25,329	25,471	25,117	23,824	22,476
13	Uenohara	City	22,677	24,805	27,114	28,986	30,157	30,248
14	Ōtsuki	City	22,525	25,419	28,120	30,879	33,124	35,199
15	Shōwa	Town	20,916	19,505	17,653	16,764	15,937	14,590
16	Ichikawamisato	Town	14,710	15,673	17,111	17,939	18,854	19,885
17	Fujikawa	Town	14,225	15,294	16,307	17,405	17,544	17,629
18	Minobu	Town	10,655	12,669	14,462	16,334	18,021	19,570
19	Oshino	Village	9,236	8,968	8,635	8,490	8,367	8,370
20	Nanbu	Town	7,157	8,067	9,011	10,254	10,863	11,437
21	Yamanakako	Village	5,178	5,208	5,324	5,440	5,274	5,296
