= Ryūō (disambiguation) =

Ryūō ('dragon king') is an annual Japanese professional shogi tournament and the title of its winner. It may also refer to:

- Ryūjin, the mythological sovereign of the Ryūgū-jō ("Dragon Palace")
- Ryūō, Shiga, a town in Gamō District, Shiga Prefecture, Japan
- Ryūō, Yamanashi, a former town in Nakakoma District, Yamanashi Prefecture, Japan
- Ryūō Station, a railway station in Kai, Yamanashi Prefecture, Japan
- Ryuoo Ropeway, an aerial lift in Yamanouchi, Nagano Prefecture, Japan
- Ryūō Noboru (born 1983), Mongolian sumo wrestler

== See also ==
- The Ryuo's Work Is Never Done!, a Japanese light novel series
