= Dragon King (comics) =

Dragon King, in comics, may refer to:

- Dragon King (DC Comics), a World War II-era DC Comics supervillain
- Dragon King, a Marvel Comics character from the MC2 universe and foe of Spider-Girl

== See also ==
- Dragon King (disambiguation)
