= Kokubo =

Kokubo (written: 國母, 小窪 or 小久保) is a Japanese surname. Notable people with the surname include:

- Christina Kokubo (1950–2007), American actress
- Hiroki Kokubo (小久保 裕紀; born 1971), Japanese baseball player
- Kazuhiro Kokubo (國母 和宏; born 1988), Japanese snowboarder
- Leo Kokubo (born 2001), Japanese footballer
- Tetsuya Kokubo (小窪 哲也; born 1985), Japanese baseball player

== See also ==
- Kokubo Station, a railway station in Kōfu, Yamanashi Prefecture, Japan
- Shusei Kokubou (Static Defense), slogan of the Imperial Japanese Navy
