= University of Yamanashi =

University in Yamanashi Prefecture, Japan

Coordinates: 35°40′42″N 138°34′23″E

- 山梨大学 (Yamanashi Daigaku)
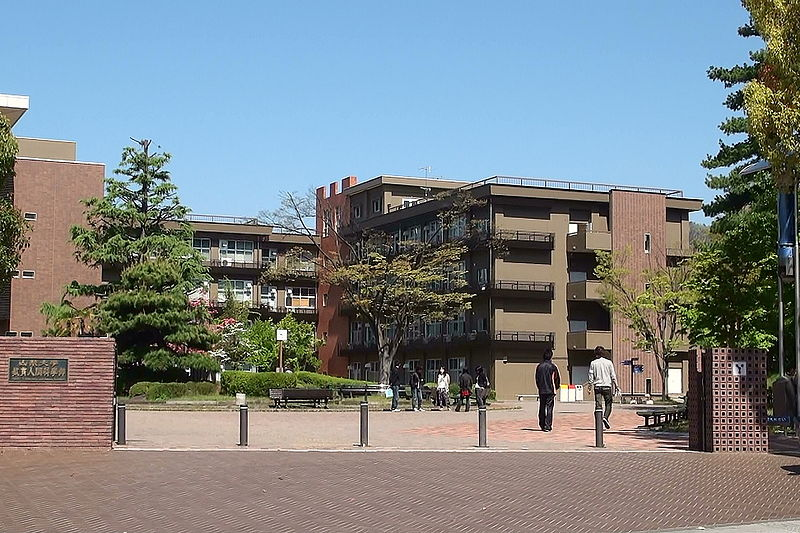
- Type: National
- Established: 2002
- President: Shinji Shimada
- Administrative staff: 1,451
- Students: 4921
- Undergraduates: 3876
- Postgraduates: 925
- Doctoral students: 270
- Location: Kofu and Tamaho, Yamanashi, Japan
- Campus: Kofu and Tamaho
- Colors: Wine red
- Nickname: Nashidai
- Website: http://www.yamanashi.ac.jp/

The University of Yamanashi (山梨大学, Yamanashi Daigaku), abbreviated to Nashidai (梨大)^{Note}, is a national university that has campuses in Kofu and Chūō, Japan. The University of Yamanashi has its origin in “Kitenkan” (徽典館) which was founded in 1795 as a branch school of “Shoheizaka-School” of Tokugawa Government (later the University of Tokyo) and was reformed into the Normal School of Yamanashi after the Meiji Restoration. In 1921 the Normal School of Yamanashi for Junior and in 1924 the Yamanashi High School of Engineering were established. After the World War II these three schools were integrated to the University of Yamanashi according to the new school system of Japan. In 1978 the Yamanashi Medical University was opened which was only a Medical University in Prefecture of Yamanashi. Today’s University of Yamanashi was founded in 2002 by a merger between (former) University of Yamanashi and Yamanashi Medical University. It is formally referred to as the National University Corporation University of Yamanashi. In 2012 the Faculty of Education and Human science and the Faculty of Engineering were reorganized and the Faculty of Life and Environmental Science was newly established. In 2016 the lifelong studies course in the Faculty of Education and Human science was abolished, and the faculty was renamed to the Faculty of Education.

The university has therefore four faculties: the Faculty of Education Human Sciences, the Faculty of Medicine, the Faculty of Engineering and the Faculty of Life and Environmental Science. It should not be confused with the similarly named Yamanashi Prefectural University.

The University of Yamanashi is located in Kofu, which is the prefectural capital of Yamanashi and is distant about 120 kilometres west from Tokyo. For the University stands in the Centre of the Kofu Basin surrounded by many mountains, many students are often engaged in leisure and sports in holidays.

== Education ==
The project of the Faculty of Engineering "Research and Education of Integrated Water Resources Management for the Asian Monsoon Region" was adopted as the 21st Century COE Program of 2002-2006. It has been followed by the Global COE Program "Evolution of Research and Education of integrated River Basin Management in Asian Region" since 2007.

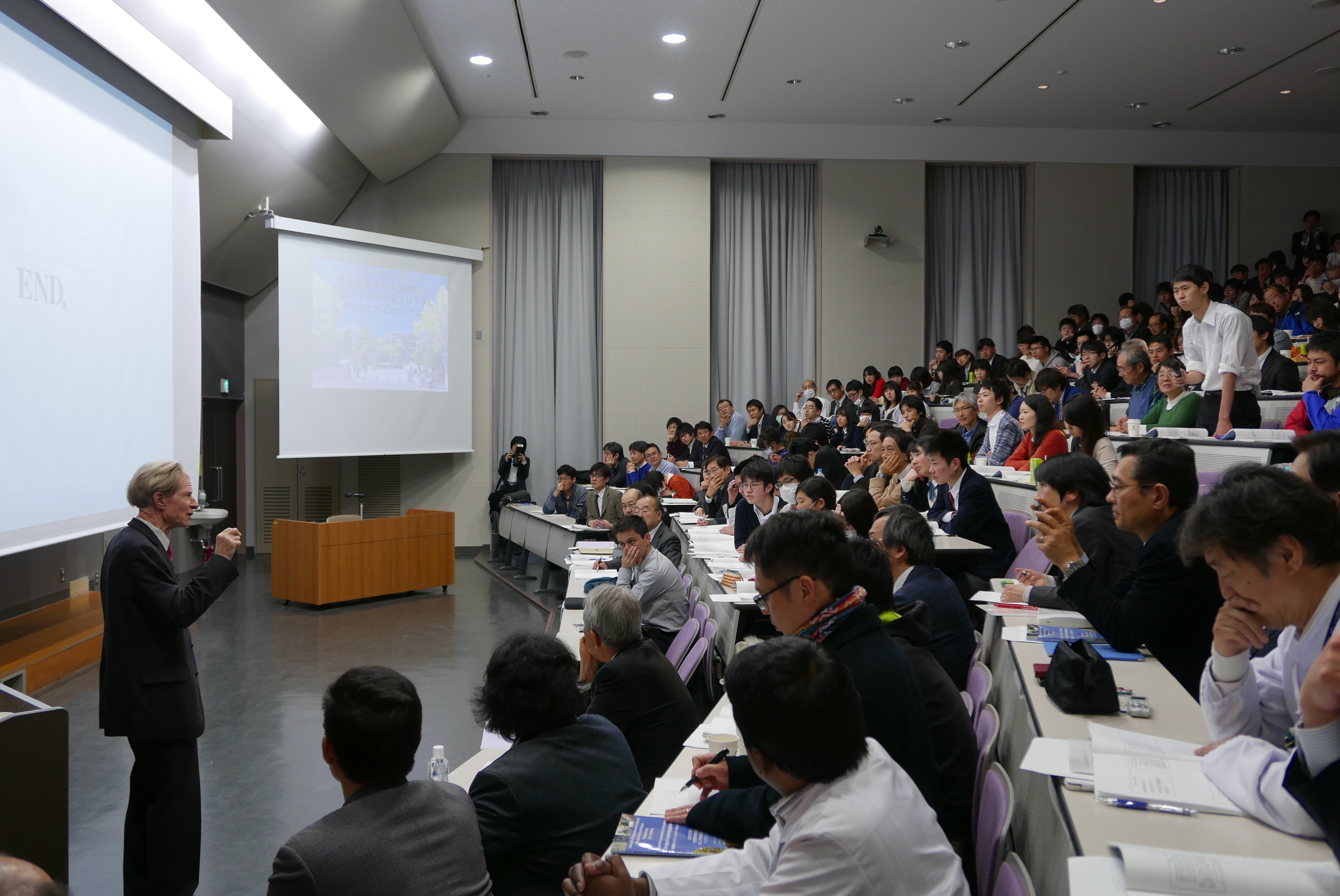
Yamanashi University faculty during a lecture by Prof. John Gordon, March 2016

- Kofu Eastern Campus (the Faculty of Technology)
  - This university has the only institution for wine (planting and brewing) in Japan. The produced wine is available in the shop in this campus.
  - Cooperative Research and Development Centre
  - Centre for Instrumental Analysis
  - Universal Information Centre
  - Fuel Cell Nanomaterials Center
  - Advanced Biotechnology Centre
  - Center for Higher Education
  - Centre for Crystal Science and Technology
  - The Institute of Enology and Viticulture
  - Centre for International Education Office of International Affairs
- Kofu Western Campus (Faculty of Education and Human Science and Faculty of Life and Environmental Science)
  - The Open University of Japan (Yamanashi Branch)
  - University Library
  - Health Service Centre
  - Student Hall
- Campus of the Faculty of Medicine
  - University Hospital
  - Universal Centre for Medical Analysis and Experiment
  - Ground of the Faculty of Medicine

== Notable alumni ==
- Satoshi Ōmura, biochemist, 2015 Nobel Prize in Physiology or Medicine winner.
- Hiroshi Ishiguro, intelligent robotics engineer, Distinguished Professor at Osaka University.
- Hiroshi Makino, inventor of the SCARA robot.

== Notes ==
The text of "「梨大」とは、山梨大学の愛称です。「山大」とかではありませんので注意してください。" translates to English as "The University of Yamanashi is colloquially called 'Nashidai'. Please note that it is not shortened to 'Yamadai' among others."

== The partner universities (a part) ==
Partners of the University of Yamanashi

- (United States) Eastern Kentucky University, USA
- (United States) University of Iowa, USA
- Chinese Academy of Sciences, China
- China Institute of Water Resources and Hydropower Research, China
- Tianjin Normal University, China
- Sichuan University, China
- China Medical University, China
- Inner Mongolia Medical University, China
- University of Indonesia (Faculty of Medicine), Indonesia
- Asian Institute of Technology, Thailand
- Khon Kaen University, Thailand
- (United Kingdom) Durham University, U.K.
- (United Kingdom) Oxford Brookes University, U.K.
- University of Technology, Australia
- TU Dresden, Germany
- Technical University of Munich, Germany

Partners of the Faculties

- Partners of Faculty of Education and Human Science
  - Ludwigsburg University of Education, Germany
  - Jean Moulin University Lyon 3, France
- Partners of Faculty of Engineering
  - (South Korea) Hanyang University, Republic of Korea
  - (South Korea) Chonbuk National University, Republic of Korea
  - Changchun Institute of Applied Chemistry, Chinese Academy of Science, China
  - Wuhan University of Technology, China
  - Southwest Jiaotong University, China
  - Northern Malaysia University, Malaysia
  - Brawijaya University, Indonesia
- Partners of Faculty of Medicine
  - Karolinska Institute, Sweden
