= Toyotomi, Yamanashi =

Dissolved municipality in Yamanashi prefecture, Japan

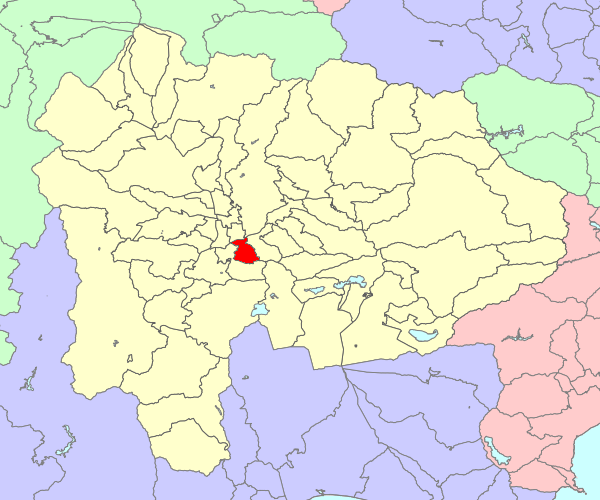
Map of former Toyotomi Village

Toyotomi (豊富村, Toyotomi-mura) was a village located in Higashiyatsushiro District, Yamanashi Prefecture, Japan.

As of 2003, the village had an estimated population of 3,616 and a population density of 267.85 persons per km^{2}. The total area was 13.50 km^{2}.

On February 20, 2006, Toyotomi, along with the towns of Tatomi and Tamaho (all from Nakakoma District), was merged to create the city of Chūō.
