= Kokubo Station =

Railway station in Shōwa, Yamanashi Prefecture, Japan

Kokubo Station 国母駅
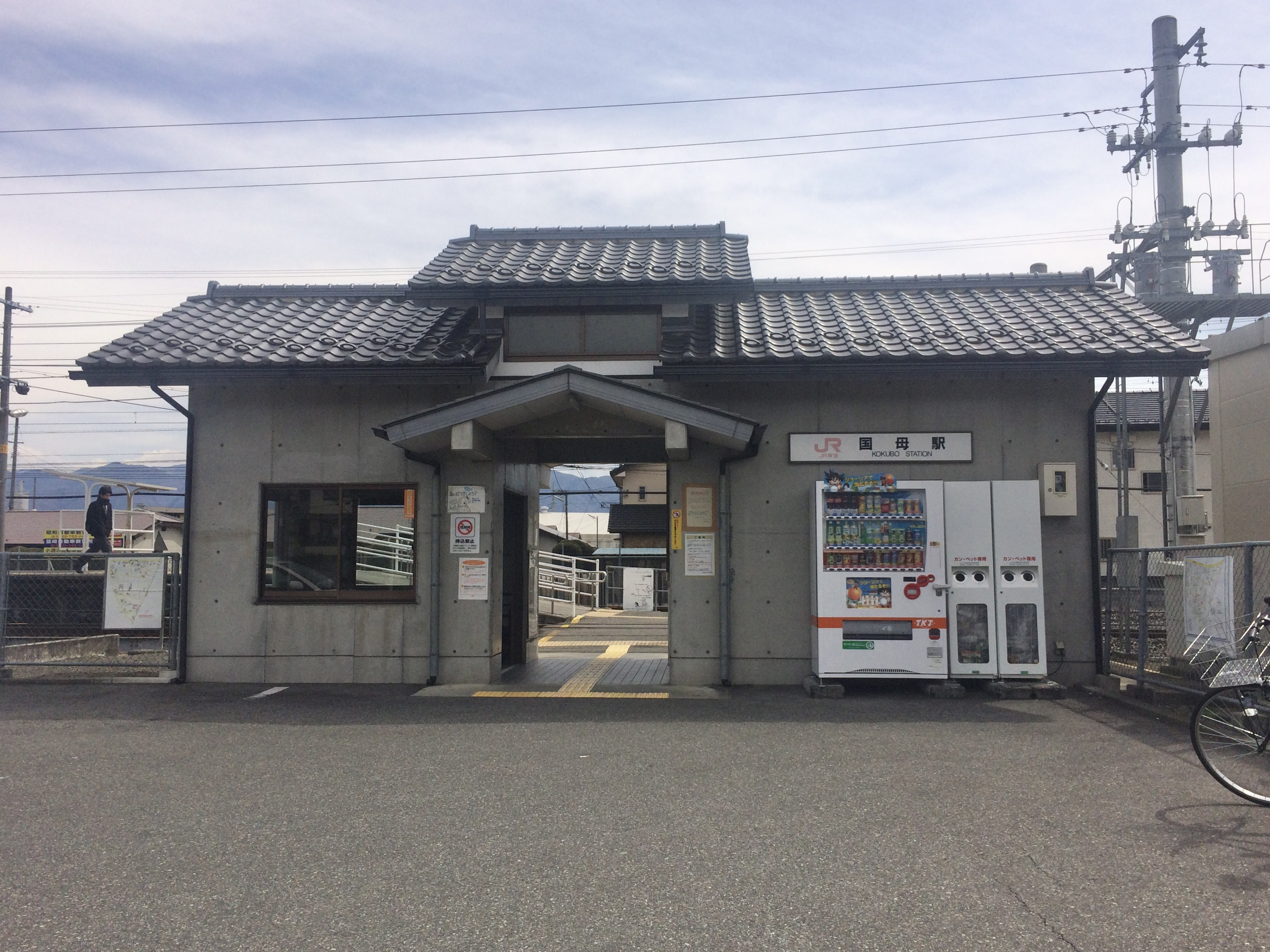
- JR Kokubo Station, March 2017

General information
- Location: 310 Saijō, Shōwa-machi, Nakakoma-gun, Yamanashi-ken; Japan
- Coordinates: 35.6304°N 138.5520°E
- Operator: JR Central
- Line: Minobu Line
- Distance: 81.2 kilometers from Fuji
- Platforms: 1 island platform

Other information
- Status: Unstaffed

History
- Opened: March 30, 1928

Passengers
- 2016: 438 daily
Location
- Location within Yamanashi Prefecture Location within Japan

Kokubo Station (国母駅, Kokubo-eki) is a train station on the Minobu Line of Central Japan Railway Company (JR Central) located in the town of Shōwa, Nakakoma District, Yamanashi Prefecture, Japan. Although officially in the town of Shōwa, the border with the city of Kōfu runs through the middle of the station.

== Lines ==
Kokubo Station is served by the Minobu Line and is located 81.2 kilometers from the southern terminus of the line at Fuji Station.

== Layout ==
Kokubo Station has one island platform connected to the station building by a level crossing. The station is unattended.

=== Platforms ===
1	■ Minobu Line	For Kōfu
2	■ Minobu Line	For Fuji, Minobu

== Adjacent stations ==
«	Service	»
Minobu Line
Limited Express Fujikawa: Does not stop at this station
Jōei	Local	Kai-Sumiyoshi

== History ==
Kokubo Station was opened on March 30, 1928, as a passenger station on the Fuji-Minobu Line. The line came under control of the Japanese Government Railways on May 1, 1941. The JGR became the JNR (Japan National Railway) after World War II. The station has been unattended since June 1983. Along with the division and privatization of JNR on April 1, 1987, the station came under the control of the Central Japan Railway Company..

== Surrounding area ==
- Kokubo Post Office

== See also ==
- List of railway stations in Japan
