= Dragon King (disambiguation) =

The Dragon King or Dragon Kings (also Dragon Gods(s)), are deities in Chinese tradition (Taoism).

Dragon King(s) in Hinduism and Buddhism refer to the Nagarajas. The Dragon King in Japanese tradition is Ryū-ō aka Ryūjin ("Dragon god") of Ryūgū-jō, sometimes equated with the sea-god Watatsumi.

Dragon King may also refer to:

== Comics ==
- Dragon King (DC Comics)
- Dragon King, an enemy of comics superheroine Spider-Girl

== Games ==
- Dragon Kings, fictional characters in Exalted
- Dragon Kings (Dark Sun), an accessory for Dungeons & Dragons
- Onaga or the Dragon King, a Mortal Kombat character
- Dragon king, a playing piece in Shogi
  - Ryūō ('Dragon King'), an annual Japanese professional shogi tournament and the title of its winner
- Dragon King: The Fighting Game, the working title of the original prototype for the 1999 fighting game Super Smash Bros.

== Novels ==
- The Dragon King (adventure book), by Trevor Baxendale, 2008
- The Dragon King (novel), by R. A. Salvatore, 1996
- The Dragon King trilogy, a series of novels written by Stephen R. Lawhead, 1982-1984 (the first being In the Hall of the Dragon King, 1982)

== Other uses ==
- Dark Kingdom: The Dragon King, a 2004 German television film
- Druk Gyalpo ('Dragon King'), the head of state of the Kingdom of Bhutan
- Dragon king theory, a statistical metaphor
- Operation Dragon King, a 1978 military operation in northern Arakan, Burma

== See also ==
- Dragon (disambiguation)
- Ryūō (disambiguation)
- Japanese dragon
- List of water deities
