= Futaba, Yamanashi =

Dissolved municipality in Yamanashi prefecture, Japan

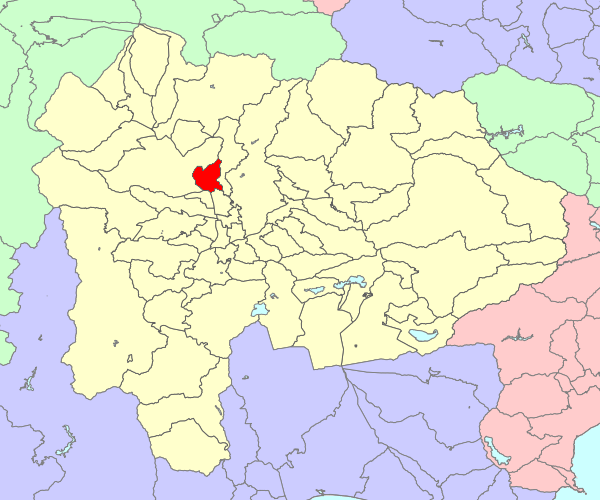
Map of former Futaba Town

Futaba (双葉町, Futaba-chō) was a town located in Kitakoma District, Yamanashi Prefecture, Japan.

As of 2003, the town had an estimated population of 13,483 and a density of 714.90 persons per km^{2}. The total area was 18.86 km^{2}.

== History ==
On September 1, 2004, Futaba, along with the towns of Ryūō and Shikishima (both from Nakakoma District), was merged to create the city of Kai.
