= Tatomi, Yamanashi =

Dissolved municipality in Yamanashi prefecture, Japan

Tatomi (田富町, Tatomi-chō) was a town located in Nakakoma District, Yamanashi Prefecture, Japan.

As of 2003, the town had an estimated population of 16,934 and a population density of 1,678.30 persons per km^{2}. The total area was 10.09 km^{2}.

On February 20, 2006, Tatomi, along with the town of Tamaho (also from Nakakoma District), and the village of Toyotomi (from Higashiyatsushiro District), was merged to create the city of Chūō.
