= Shikishima, Yamanashi =

Dissolved municipality in Yamanashi prefecture, Japan

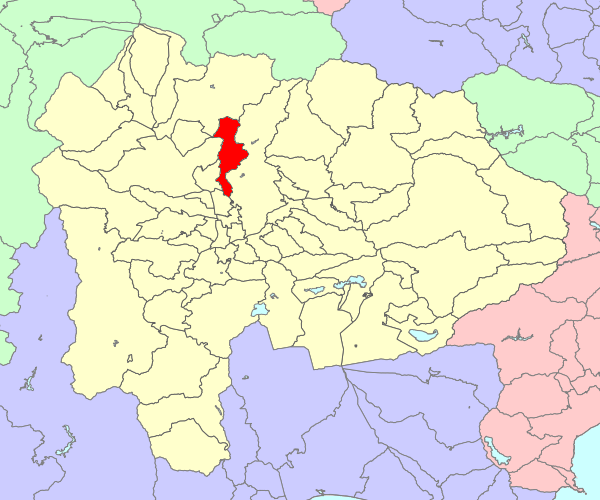
Map of former Shikishima Town

Shikishima (敷島町, Shikishima-machi) was a town located in Nakakoma District, Yamanashi Prefecture, Japan.

As of 2003, the town had an estimated population of 18,986 and a density of 471.35 persons per km^{2}. The total area was 40.28 km^{2}.

On September 1, 2004, Shikishima, along with the town of Futaba (from Kitakoma District), and the town of Ryūō (also from Nakakoma District), was merged to create the city of Kai.
