= Tamaho, Yamanashi =

Dissolved municipality in Yamanashi prefecture, Japan

Tamaho (玉穂町, Tamaho-chō) was a town located in Nakakoma District, Yamanashi Prefecture, Japan.

As of 2003, the town had an estimated population of 10,612 and a population density of 1,291.00 persons per km^{2}. The total area was 8.22 km^{2}.

On February 20, 2006, Tamaho, along with the town of Tatomi (also from Nakakoma District), and the village of Toyotomi (from Nishiyatsushiro District), was merged to create the city of Chūō.
