= Ryūō, Yamanashi =

Former municipality in Nakakoma district, Yamanashi prefecture, Japan

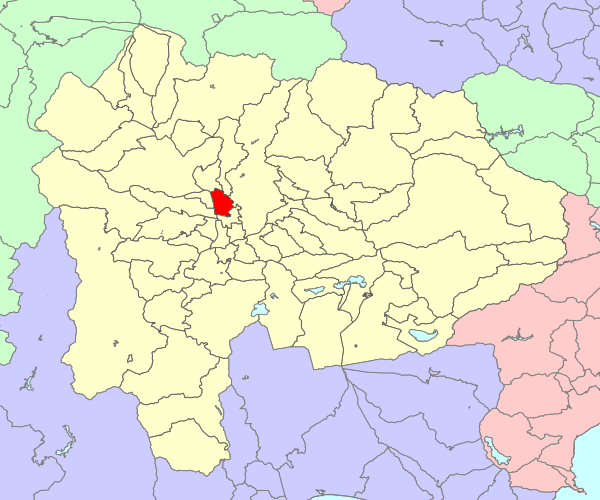
Map of former Ryūō Town

Ryūō (竜王町, Ryūō-machi) was a town located in Nakakoma District, Yamanashi Prefecture, Japan.

As of 2003, the town had an estimated population of 40,969 and a density of 3,200.70 persons per km^{2}. The total area was 12.80 km^{2}.

On September 1, 2004, Ryūō, along with the town of Futaba (from Kitakoma District) and the town of Shikishima (also from Nakakoma District), was merged to create the city of Kai.

Photographs of the skyline were used as temporary backdrops for the unfinished video game Dragon King: The Fighting Game (格闘ゲーム竜王, Kakutō Gēmu Ryūō), which would eventually become Super Smash Bros.
