= Chūō, Yamanashi =

Chūō 中央市
- City
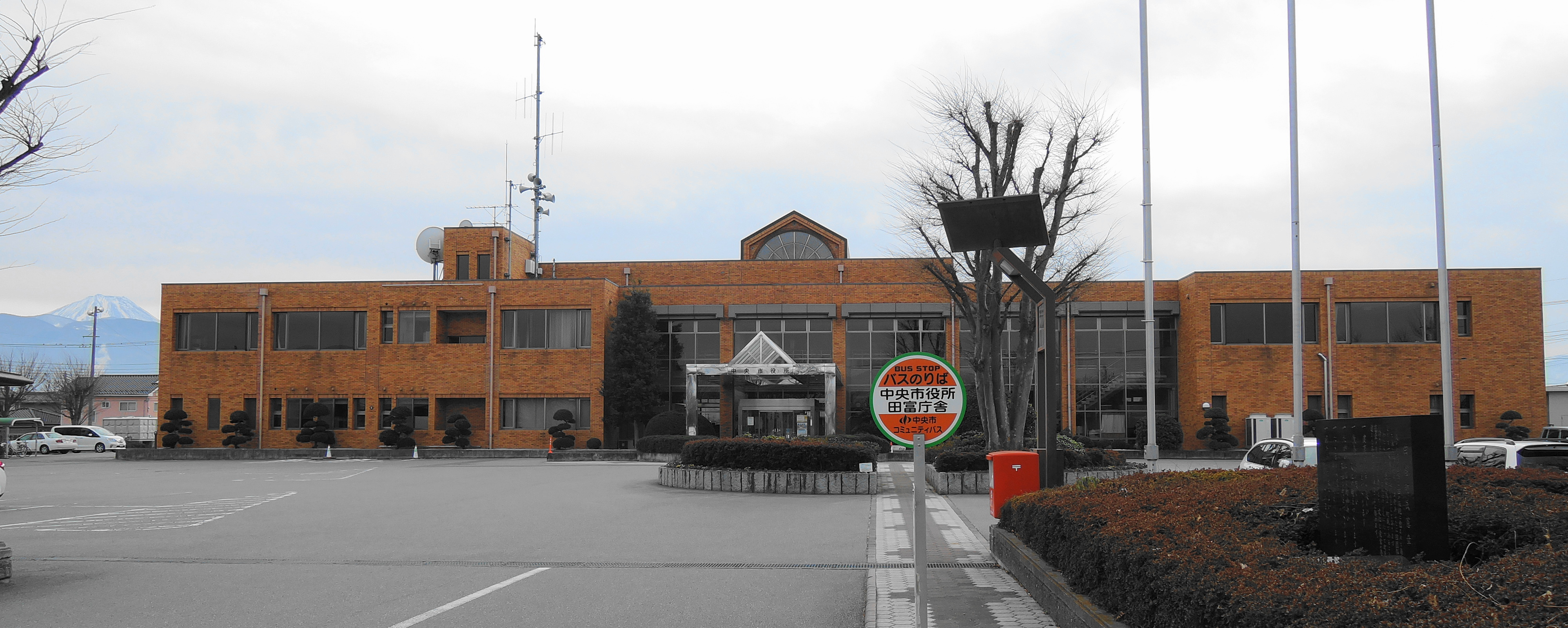
- Chūō City Hall

- Flag Seal

- Location of Chūō in Yamanashi Prefecture

- Coordinates: 35°35′58.6″N 138°38′2.1″E
- Country: Japan
- Region: Chūbu (Tōkai)
- Prefecture: Yamanashi Prefecture

Area
  - Total: 31.69 km^{2} (12.24 sq mi)

Population (October 1, 2020)
  - Total: 30,660
  - Density: 967.5/km^{2} (2,506/sq mi)
- Time zone: UTC+9 (Japan Standard Time)
- Phone number: 055-274-1111
- Address: Usuiahara 301-1, Chūō City, Yamanashi 409-3892
- Website: Official website

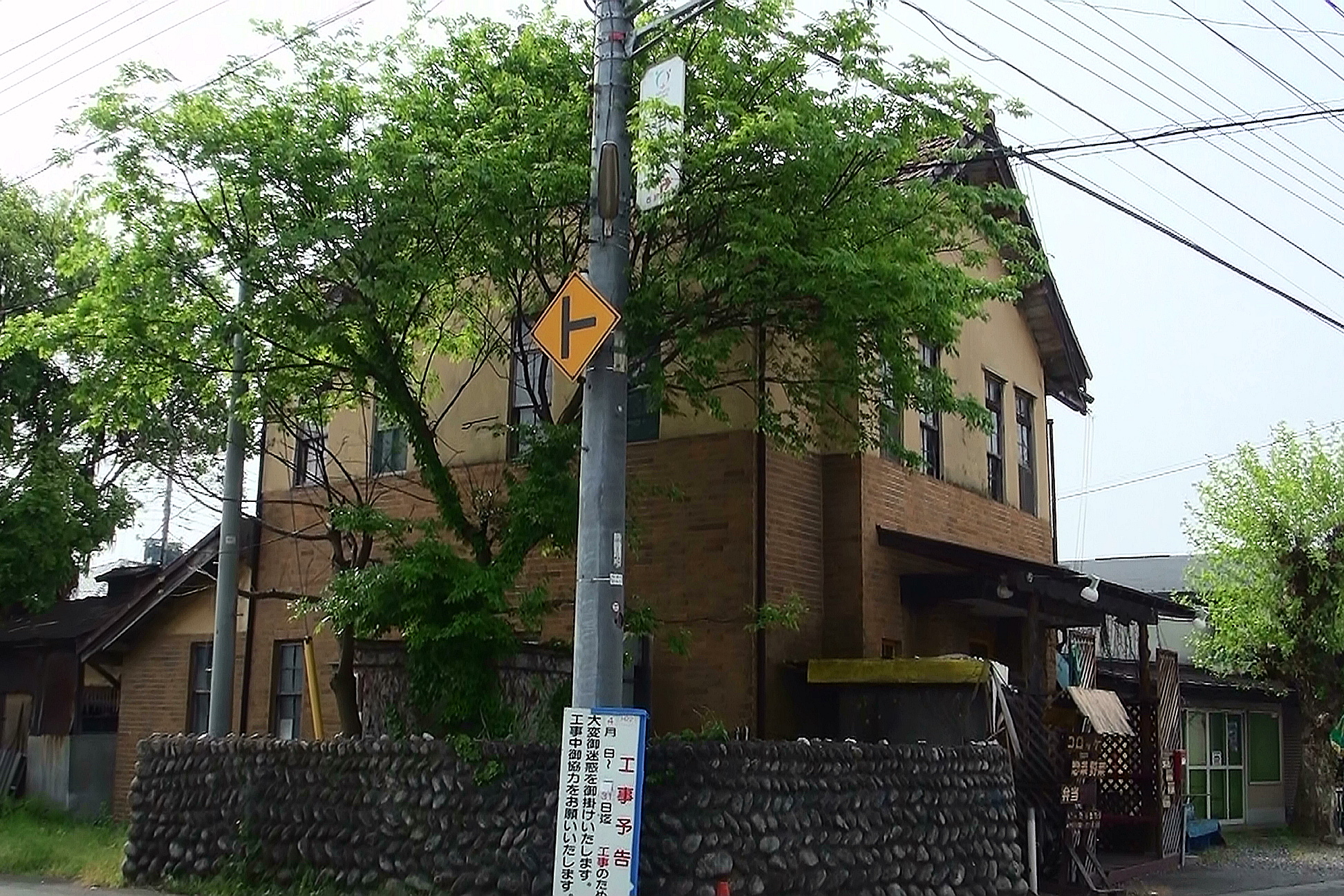
Koikawa Post Office in Chūō, Yamanashi

Chūō (中央市, Chūō-shi; Japanese pronunciation: [c̟͡ɕɨ̀ɨ́.ó̞ò̞(.ɕì), -ó̞ó̞, c̟͡ɕɨ́ɨ́-]) is a city located in Yamanashi Prefecture, Japan. As of 1 October 2020, the city had an estimated population of 30,660 in 13,954 households, and a population density of 970 persons per km^{2}. The total area of the city is 31.69 square kilometres (12.24 sq mi).

== Geography ==
Chūō is located near the geographic center of the Kōfu Plateau of central Yamanashi Prefecture, hence its name which means "centre" in Japanese. The Fuji River flows through the city.

=== Surrounding municipalities ===
Yamanashi Prefecture

- Ichikawamisato
- Kōfu
- Minami-Alps
- Shōwa

=== Climate ===
The city has a climate characterized by hot and humid summers, and relatively mild winters (Köppen climate classification Cfa). The average annual temperature in Chūō is 14.6 °C. The average annual rainfall is 1339 mm with September as the wettest month. The temperatures are highest on average in August, at around 26.8 °C, and lowest in January, at around 2.9 °C.

== Demographics ==
Per Japanese census data, the population of Chūō has recently plateaued after several decades of growth.

Historical population
Year	Pop.	±%
1940	11,589	—
1950	14,335	+23.7%
1960	12,538	−12.5%
1970	11,747	−6.3%
1980	16,812	+43.1%
1990	25,868	+53.9%
2000	30,769	+18.9%
2010	31,322	+1.8%
2020	31,216	−0.3%

== History ==
The modern city of Chūō was established on February 20, 2006, from the merger of the towns of Tamaho and Tatomi (both from Nakakoma District), and the village of Toyotomi (from Higashiyatsushiro District).

== Government ==
Chūō has a mayor-council form of government with a directly elected mayor and a unicameral city legislature of 18 members.

== Economy ==
The economy of Chūō is dominated by agriculture, with rice, corn and tomatoes as the major cash crops.

== Education ==
- University of Yamanashi – Medical School campus
- Chūō has six public elementary schools and three public middle schools operated by the city government. The city does not have any high schools.

== Transportation ==
=== Railway ===
- Central Japan Railway Company - Minobu Line
  - Higashi-Hanawa - Koikawa

=== Highway ===
- Chūō Expressway
- National Route 140

== Notable people from Chūō ==
- Masao Inoue, Japanese professional wrestler (Pro Wrestling Noah)
- Hidehiro Sugai, Japanese footballer currently playing as a left-back for Kashima Antlers of J1 League
- Shingo Takagi, Japanese professional wrestler (New Japan Pro-Wrestling)
