= Kai, Yamanashi =

Kai 甲斐市
- City
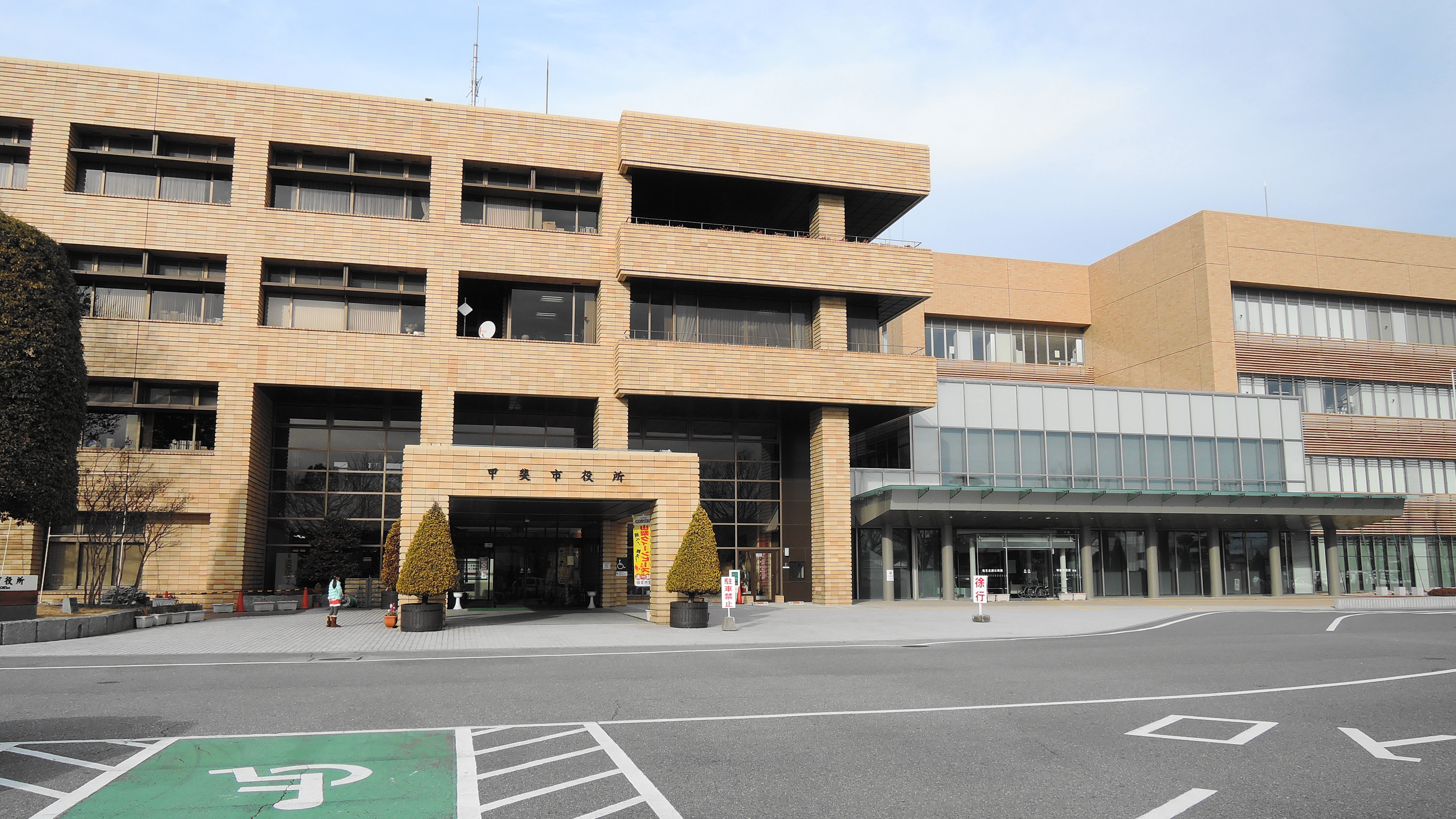
- Kai City Hall

- Flag Emblem

- Location of Kai in Yamanashi Prefecture

- Coordinates: 35°39′38.9″N 138°30′56.8″E
- Country: Japan
- Region: Chūbu (Tōkai)
- Prefecture: Yamanashi Prefecture

Area
  - Total: 71.95 km^{2} (27.78 sq mi)

Population (December 31, 2021)
  - Total: 73,626
  - Density: 1,023/km^{2} (2,650/sq mi)
- Time zone: UTC+9 (Japan Standard Time)
- City symbols
  - Tree: Zelkova serrata
  - Flower: Sakura
- Phone number: 055-276-2111
- Address: 2610 Shinohara, Kai-shi, Yamanashi 400-0395
- Website: Official website

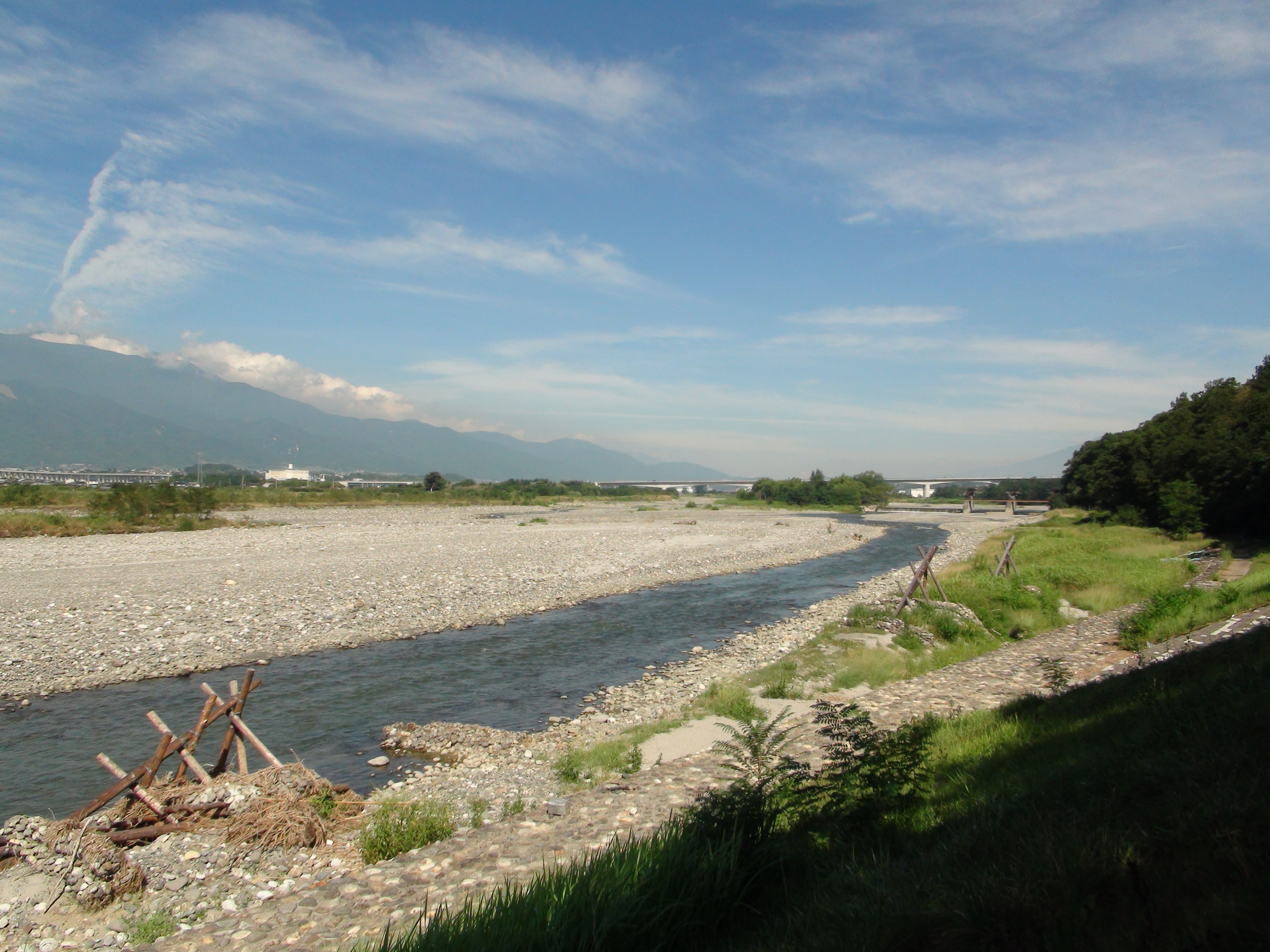
Shingen Embankment and Kamanashi River

Kai (甲斐市, Kai-shi; Japanese pronunciation: [kä́(.)ì, kä̀.í.ɕì] (Note: The placename is only pronounced like this with an accent. The common noun meaning "worthwhileness" is pronounced [kä̀í] without an accent.)) is a city located in Yamanashi Prefecture, Japan. As of 31 December 2021, the city had an estimated population of 73,626, and a population density of 1,100 persons per km^{2}. The total area of the city is 71.95 square kilometres (27.78 sq mi).

== Geography ==
Kai is located in central Yamanashi Prefecture, orientated north–south along the banks of the Fuji River.

=== Surrounding municipalities ===
Yamanashi Prefecture

- Hokuto
- Kōfu
- Minami-Alps
- Nirasaki
- Shōwa

=== Climate ===
The city has a climate characterized by hot and humid summers, and relatively mild winters (Köppen climate classification Cfa). The average annual temperature in Kai is 14.3 °C. The average annual rainfall is 1240 mm with September as the wettest month. The temperatures are highest on average in August, at around 26.7 °C, and lowest in January, at around 2.4 °C.

== Demographics ==
Per Japanese census data, the population of Kai more than tripled between 1960 and 2000 and has grown at a slower pace since.

Historical population
| Year | Pop. | ±% |
|---|---|---|
| 1940 | 17,777 | — |
| 1950 | 24,497 | +37.8% |
| 1960 | 22,951 | −6.3% |
| 1970 | 27,075 | +18.0% |
| 1980 | 45,337 | +67.4% |
| 1990 | 60,765 | +34.0% |
| 2000 | 71,706 | +18.0% |
| 2010 | 73,807 | +2.9% |
| 2020 | 75,313 | +2.0% |

== History ==
The area of present-day Kai was part of ancient Kai Province and have numerous Jomon period ruins. During the Sengoku period, warlord Takeda Shingen built embankments on the Kamanashi River for flood control and to open up new rice lands. During the Edo period, all of Kai Province was tenryō territory under direct control of the Tokugawa shogunate.

The city of Kai was established on September 1, 2004, from the merger of the town of Futaba (from Kitakoma District), and the towns of Ryūō and Shikishima (both from Nakakoma District). It takes its name from the old name for Yamanashi Prefecture, Kai Province.

== Government ==
Kai has a mayor-council form of government with a directly elected mayor and a unicameral city legislature of 19 members.

== Education ==
Kai has eleven public elementary schools and five public middle schools operated by the city government and one public high school operated by the Yamanashi Prefectural Board of Education.

== Transportation ==
=== Railway ===
- East Japan Railway Company - Chūō Main Line
  - Ryūō - Shiozaki

=== Highway ===
- Chūō Expressway
- Chūbu-Ōdan Expressway
- National Route 20
- National Route 52

== Sister cities ==
- Keokuk, Iowa, United States

== Notable people ==
- Youichi Imamura – professional racecar driver
- Shin Nakagomi – professional baseball player
- Karin Ogino – former idol
