= Nakakoma District, Yamanashi =

District in Yamanashi prefecture, Japan

Coordinates: 35.6251°N 138.5350°E

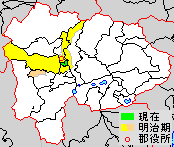
Map showing original extent of Nakakoma District in Yamanashi Prefecture: * yellow - areas formerly within the district borders during the early Meiji period * green - current borders: 1. Shōwa-machi

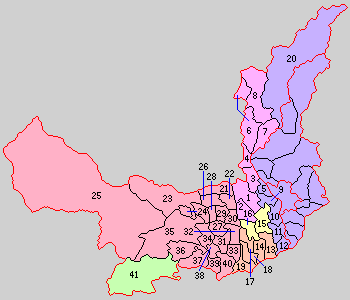
Colored areas are in this district.

Nakakoma (中巨摩郡, Nakakoma-gun) is a district located in Yamanashi Prefecture, Japan.

As of 1 October 2020, the district has a population of 20,909 with a density of 2,386 persons per km^{2}. The total area is 9.08 km^{2}.

== Municipalities ==
The district consists of one town:

- Shōwa (Note: Classified as a town.)

== History ==
=== District Timeline ===
Nakakoma District was founded from the split of Koma District during the early Meiji period establishment of the municipalities system on July 22, 1878 and initially consisted of 52 villages.

=== Recent mergers ===
- On April 1, 2003 - The towns of Shirane, Wakakusa, Kushigata and Kōsai, and the villages of Hatta and Ashiyasu were merged to form the new city of Minami-Alps.
- On September 1, 2004 - The towns of Ryūō and Shikishima were merged with the town of Futaba (from Kitakoma District) to form the new city of Kai.
- On February 20, 2006 - The towns of Tamaho and Tatomi were merged with the village of Toyotomi (from Higashiyatsushiro District) to form the new city of Chūō.
