= Shōwa, Yamanashi =

Shōwa 昭和町
- Town
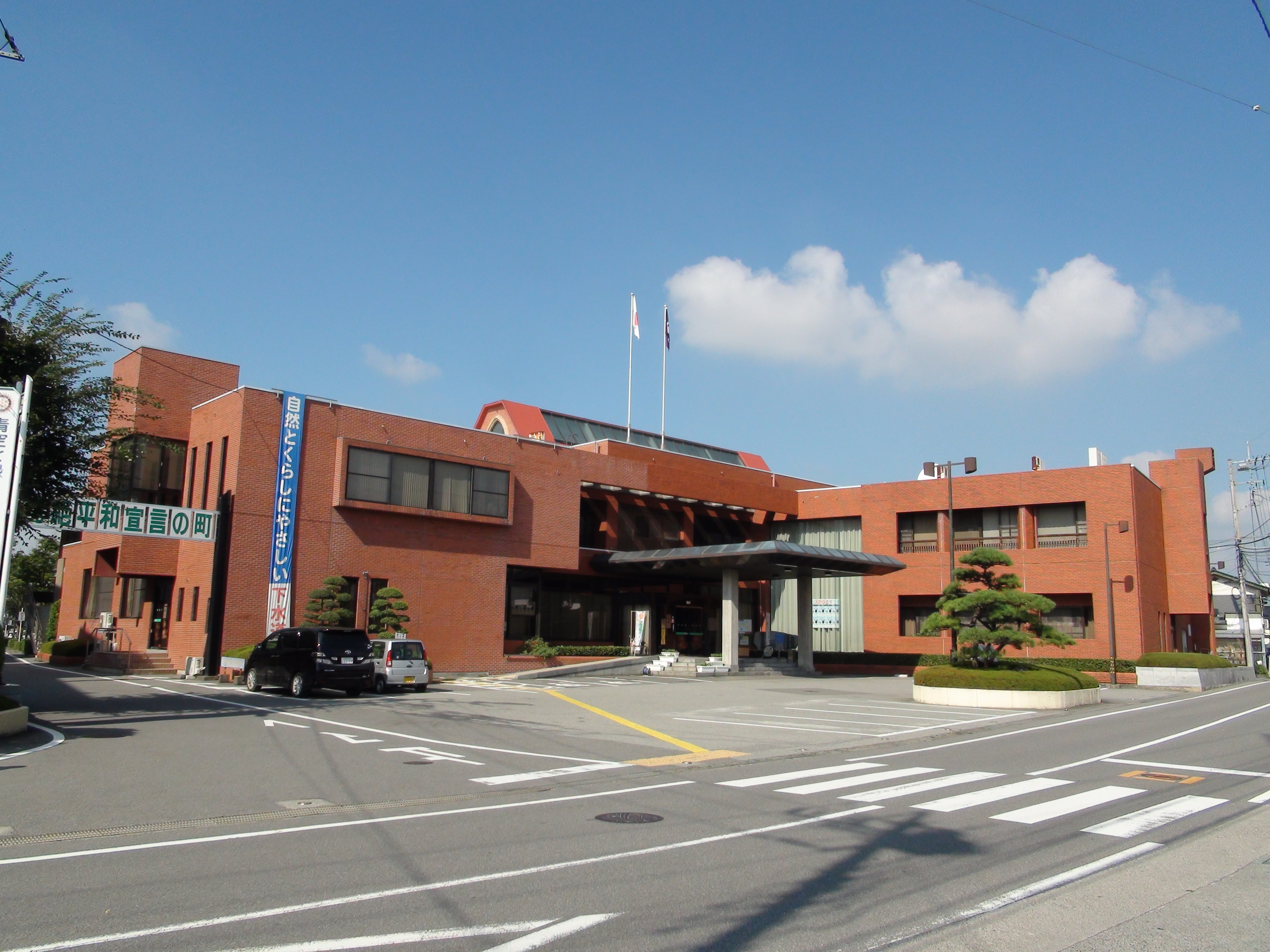
- Showa town hall

- Flag Seal

- Location of Shōwa in Yamanashi Prefecture

- Coordinates: 35°38′N 138°32′E
- Country: Japan
- Region: Chūbu; Tōkai
- Prefecture: Yamanashi
- District: Nakakoma

Area
  - Total: 9.08 km^{2} (3.51 sq mi)

Population (May 31, 2019)
  - Total: 20,338
  - Density: 2,240/km^{2} (5,800/sq mi)
- Time zone: UTC+9 (Japan Standard Time)
- Symbols
  - Tree: Camellia
  - Flower: Astragalus
  - Bird: Eurasian skylark
- Phone number: 055-275-2111
- Address: 542-2 Oshikoshi, Shōwa chō, Nakakoma -gun, Yamanashi-ken 409-3880 409-3880
- Website: Official website

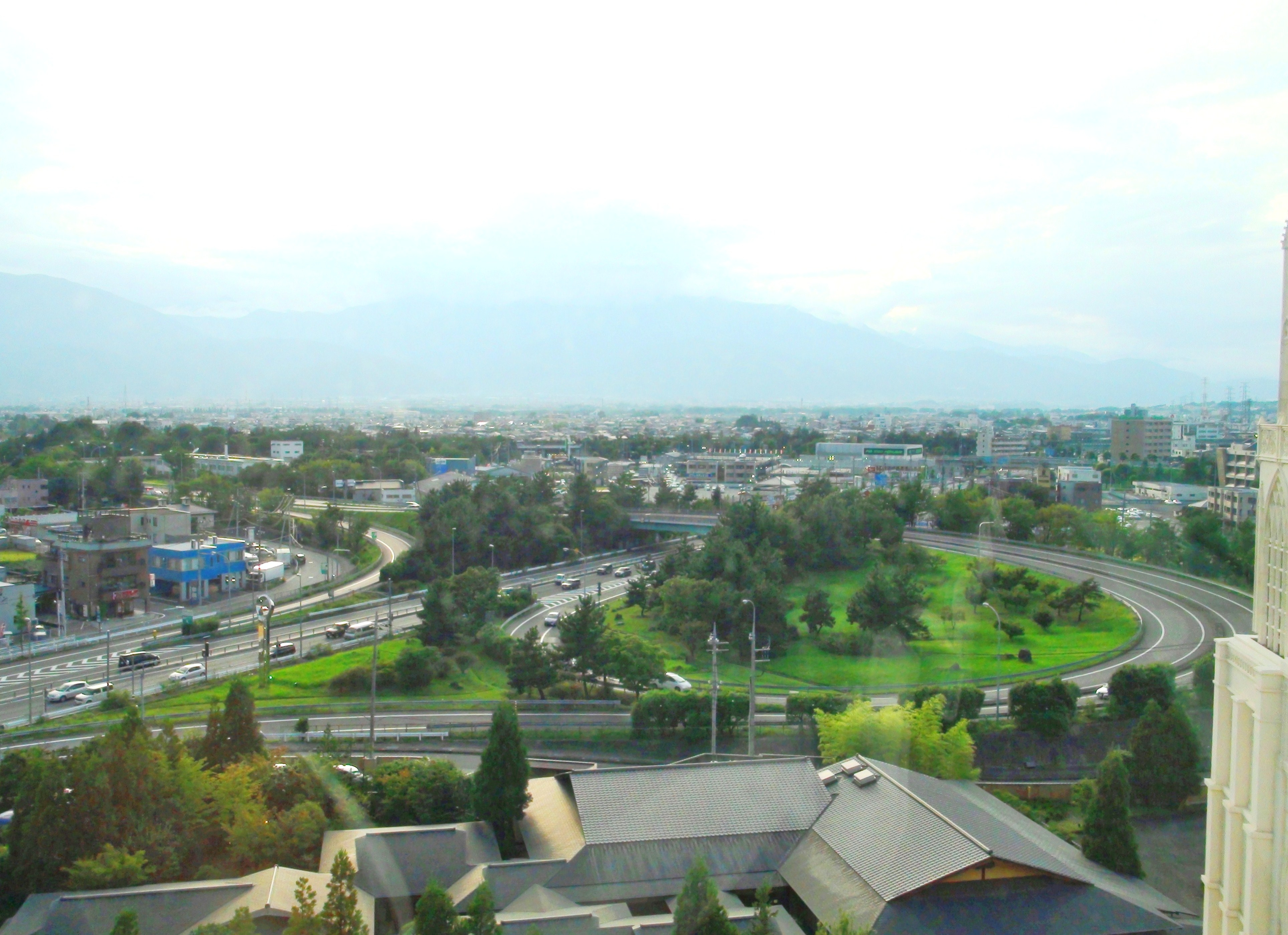
Kofu-Showa Interchange, Route 20

Shōwa (昭和町, Shōwa-chō) is a town located in Yamanashi Prefecture, Japan. As of 31 May 2019, the town had an estimated population of 20,338 in 8768 households and a population density of 2200 per km^{2}. The total area of the town is 9.08 square kilometres (3.51 sq mi).

== Geography ==
Shōwa is located in central Yamanashi Prefecture, southwest of Kōfu, the prefectural capital. Japan National Route 20 marks the boundary with Kōfu. Shōwa-dōri is the main road that runs through the middle of Shōwa, despite being called Shōwa Bypass by residents of the town. The Chūō Expressway also cuts over Shōwa running from north to south. The town is part of the greater Kōfu urban area and many "Kōfu" branches of businesses are in fact in Showa, for instance Aeon mall and Toho cinema. The border between Kōfu and Shōwa is heavily built up and indistinct.

=== Neighboring municipalities ===
Yamanashi Prefecture

- Chūō
- Kai
- Kōfu
- Minami-Alps

=== Climate ===
The town has a climate characterized by characterized by hot and humid summers, and relatively mild winters (Köppen climate classification Cfa). The average annual temperature in Shōwa is 14.5 °C. The average annual rainfall is 1273 mm with September as the wettest month. At the beginning of October, 2020 the daily temperature ranged from 26.0 °C to nightly low of 15 °C

== Demographics ==
Per Japanese census data, the population of Shōwa has grown rapidly over the past 50 years.

Historical population
Year	Pop.	±%
1940	4,200	—
1950	5,538	+31.9%
1960	5,011	−9.5%
1970	5,662	+13.0%
1980	8,751	+54.6%
1990	12,548	+43.4%
2000	15,937	+27.0%
2010	17,653	+10.8%
2020	20,909	+18.4%

== History ==
The area of present-day Shōwa was part of a shōen in the late Heian period controlled by Minamoto no Yoshikiyo, the ancestor of the Takeda clan. In the Edo period, along with the rest of Kai Province, the area was tenryō territory controlled directly by the Tokugawa shogunate. After the Meiji restoration, the area was organized into villages within Nakakoma District, Yamanashi with the establishment of the modern municipalities system on July 1, 1889. Shōwa village was established in 1942 by the merger of Saijō, Jōei and Oshihara villages within Nakakoma District. The village was elevated to town status in June 1971.

== Education ==
Shōwa has three elementary Schools (Jōei, Oshihara and Saijōo) and one junior high school (Oshihara) operated by the town government, and one public high school operated by the Yamanashi Prefectural Board of Education. The local town promotes adult night classes and classes for pensioners. These include Japanese language for foreign residents.

== Transportation ==
=== Railway ===
- Central Japan Railway Company - Minobu Line
  - Jōei - Kokubo

=== Highway ===
- Chūō Expressway
