= Donation box =

Way of collecting donations

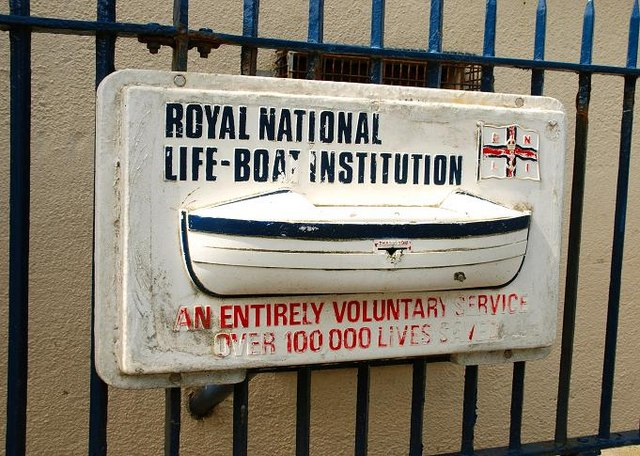
Outdoor donation box for the RNLI at Portrush, Cornwall, UK

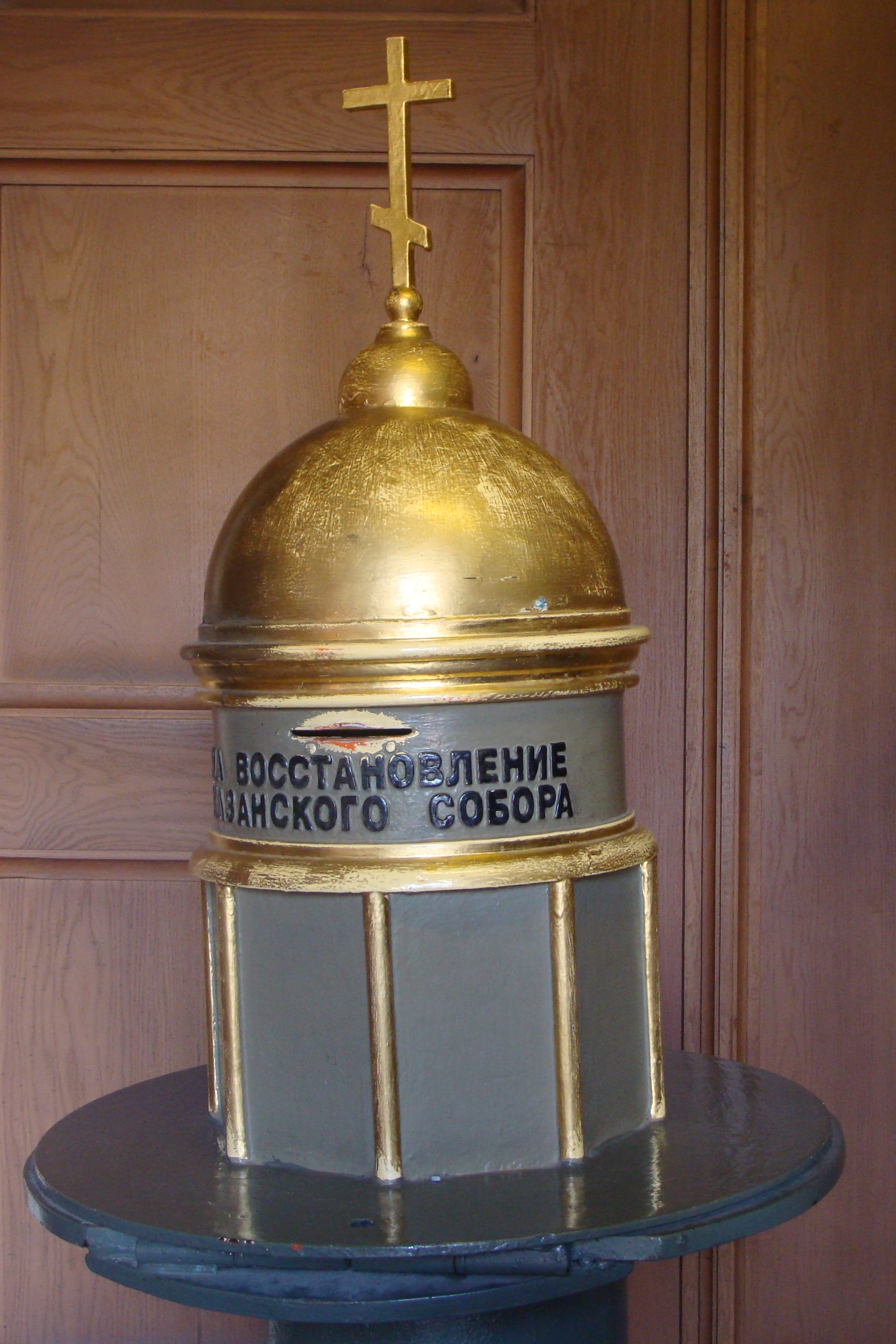
Indoor donation box "For the restoration of the Kazan Cathedral, Saint Petersburg

A donation box or collecting box is a receptacle for receiving donations. These are typically found in public places, as a means of generating additional revenue in small increments. Churches, libraries, museums, and many non-profit organizations make use of donation boxes.

In churches it is common to find a Mite box or Alms Box, and in Shinto shrines a Saisen-bako.
