= Coins as votive offering =

Wish-making customs

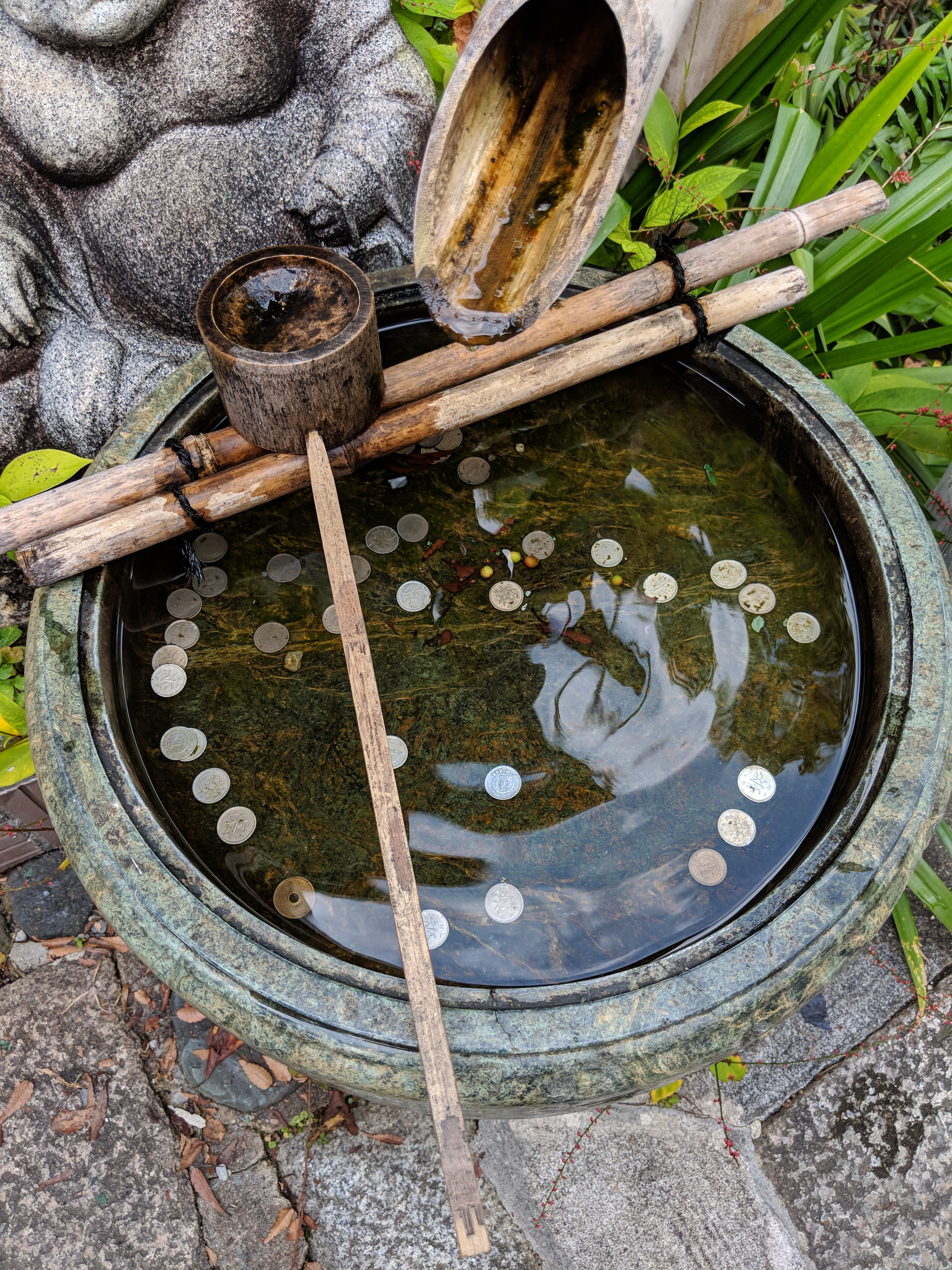
Small Japanese yen coins at the receiving point

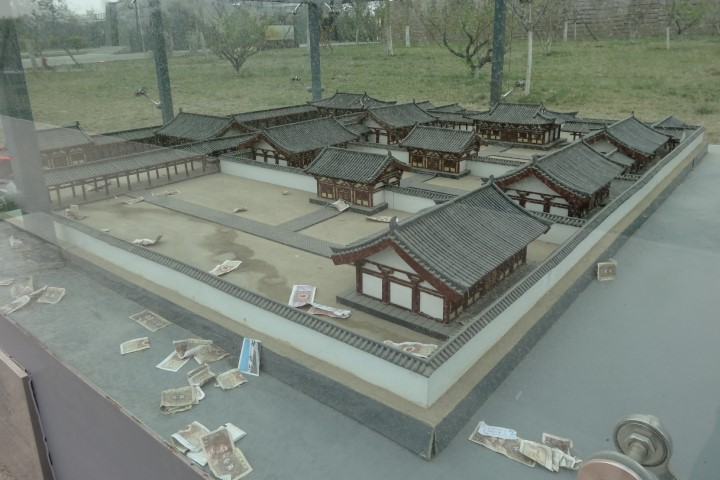
Money in glass display cabinet of hall model at the Daming Palace National Heritage Park.

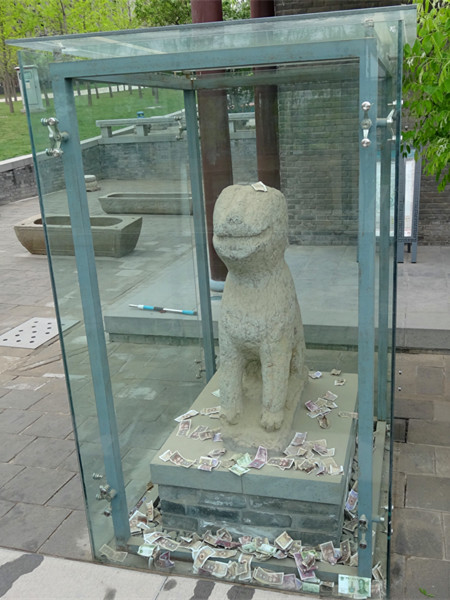
Money in Glass Display Cabinet of Stone Statue at Qin Er Shi Mausoleum

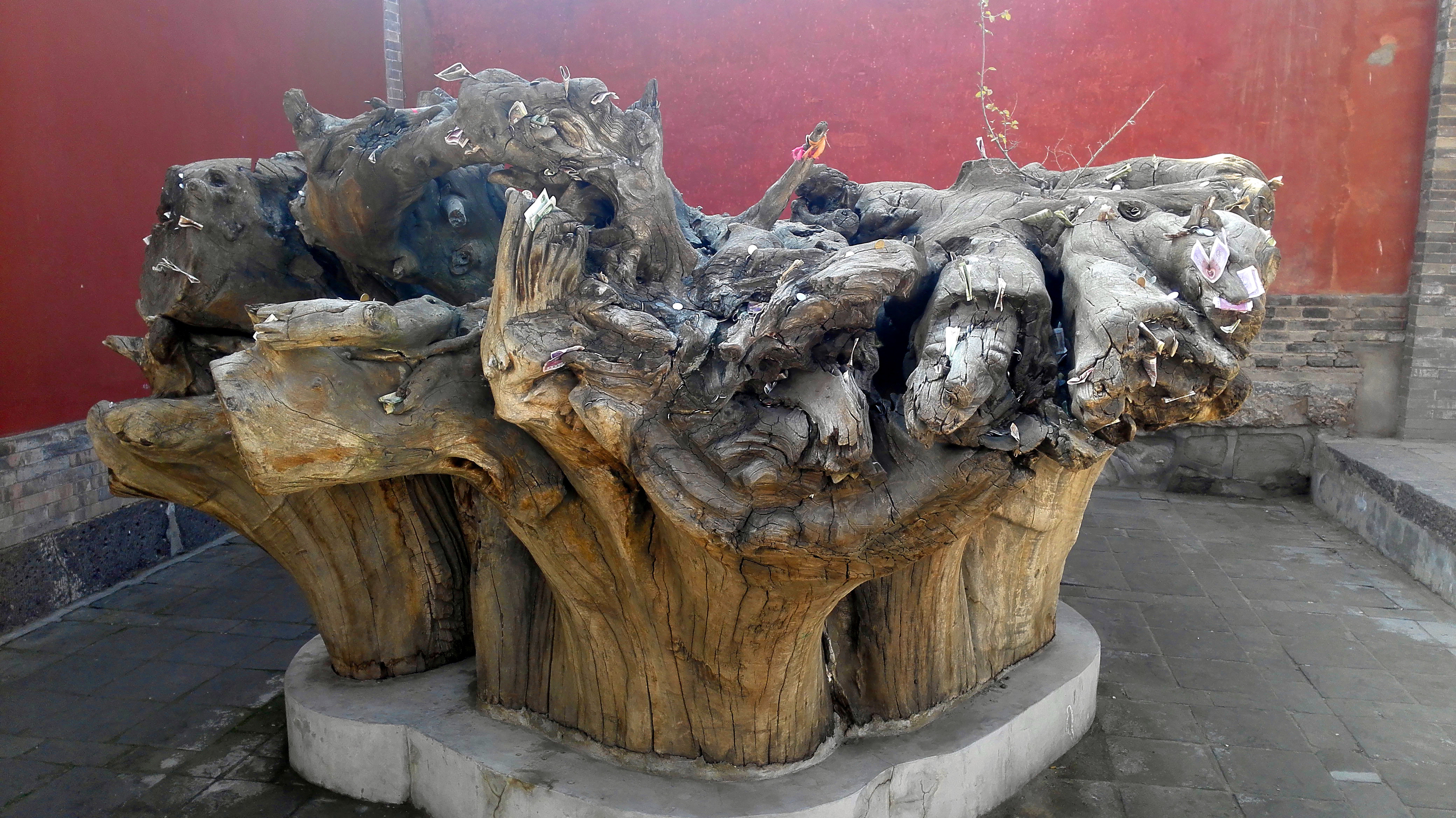
A tree root with a large amount of coins stuffed inside the Dazhao Temple in Hohhot

In many cultures, coins are used as votive offerings, usually through the act of throwing coins at or in specific objects such as rivers, lakes, ponds, wells, fountains, statues, bells, vehicles, and other objects to pray for blessings, avert disasters, and make wishes.

The coin offering is sometimes accompanied by a throwing game, such as aiming the coin at a specific target like a censer, a bell, or a designated spot, such as inside an incense burner or through the eyes of a statue.

== China ==
=== The influence of religious beliefs ===
In the Tang Dynasty text "Chao Ye Qian Zai," it is recorded that "In the regions of Bingzhou and Shouyang, there is a Jealous Maiden Spring with a temple dedicated to a deity. The water of the spring is crystal clear to a depth of a thousand feet. Worshippers throw in coins and sheep bones, which can be seen clearly in the water."

At the beginning of the late Qing Dynasty, some religious sites began to set up coin games to entertain visitors. The opera artist Wu Mei visited White Cloud Temple and saw a chime hanging under a bridge arch over a dry pool. Visitors would throw coins at the chime, and hitting it was considered bringing "great luck". Published in 1935, the Cultural Relics in the Old Capital specifically mentioned that there were no steps to get under the bridge to collect the coins. During the ten-day temple fair in the first month of the lunar year, visitors could throw tens of thousands of coins into the pool, which was enough for the whole years operation of the Taoist temple.

Influenced by the practices at White Cloud Temple, other temples around Beijing have also begun to set up games to raise money from visitors and pilgrims. With the development of tourism, these games have spread to religious sites across mainland China. Many attractions, such as Jade Emperor Peak, have dedicated staff to help visitors easily exchange coins.

Animals believed to possess spirituality in zoos, or historical relics with auspicious connotations, are often bombarded with a large number of coins or notes. This blind faith-based practice not only increases the burden on staff at these attractions but also damages the appearance of historical sites and disrupts the living environment of animals.

=== Western cultural influences ===
The 1953 romantic comedy "Roman Holiday" was released in mainland China in 1986 after being dubbed by Changchun Film Studio. Not only did the female protagonist's hairstyle and clothing become a fashion trend at the time, but the scene of tossing a coin and making a wish at the Trevi Fountain also became a classic memory of love and romance for a generation. Inspired by the film, some tourist attractions renamed their existing pools such as life release ponds "Wishing Pools", or constructed new ones.

Many tourists proactively throw coins into any water-filled receptacle within scenic areas. Apart from designated wishing wells, fountains, water tanks, and fish ponds all become targets. This practice is not limited to religious sites like Buddhist temples and Taoist shrines; coins are also thrown in places where such acts of prayer are inappropriate, such as the pool in the Peace Park west of the Memorial Hall of the Victims in Nanjing Massacre by Japanese Invaders, the showcases of dinosaur fossil skeletons at the National Natural History Museum of China or of the Terra Cotta Warriors at the Shaanxi History Museum.

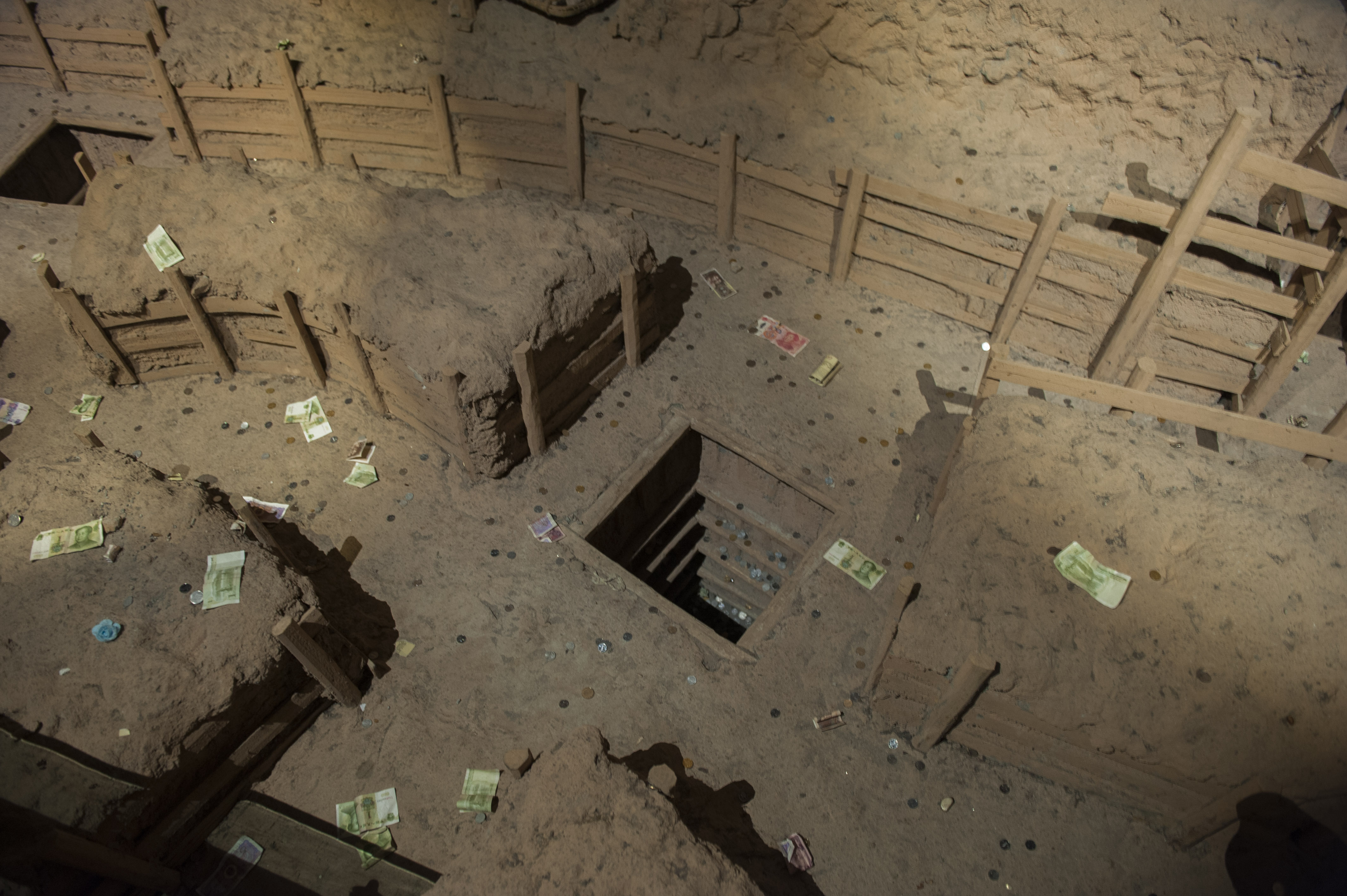
Coins of the Copper Mine Model in Tonglushan, Hubei Provincial Museum

=== Negative effects ===
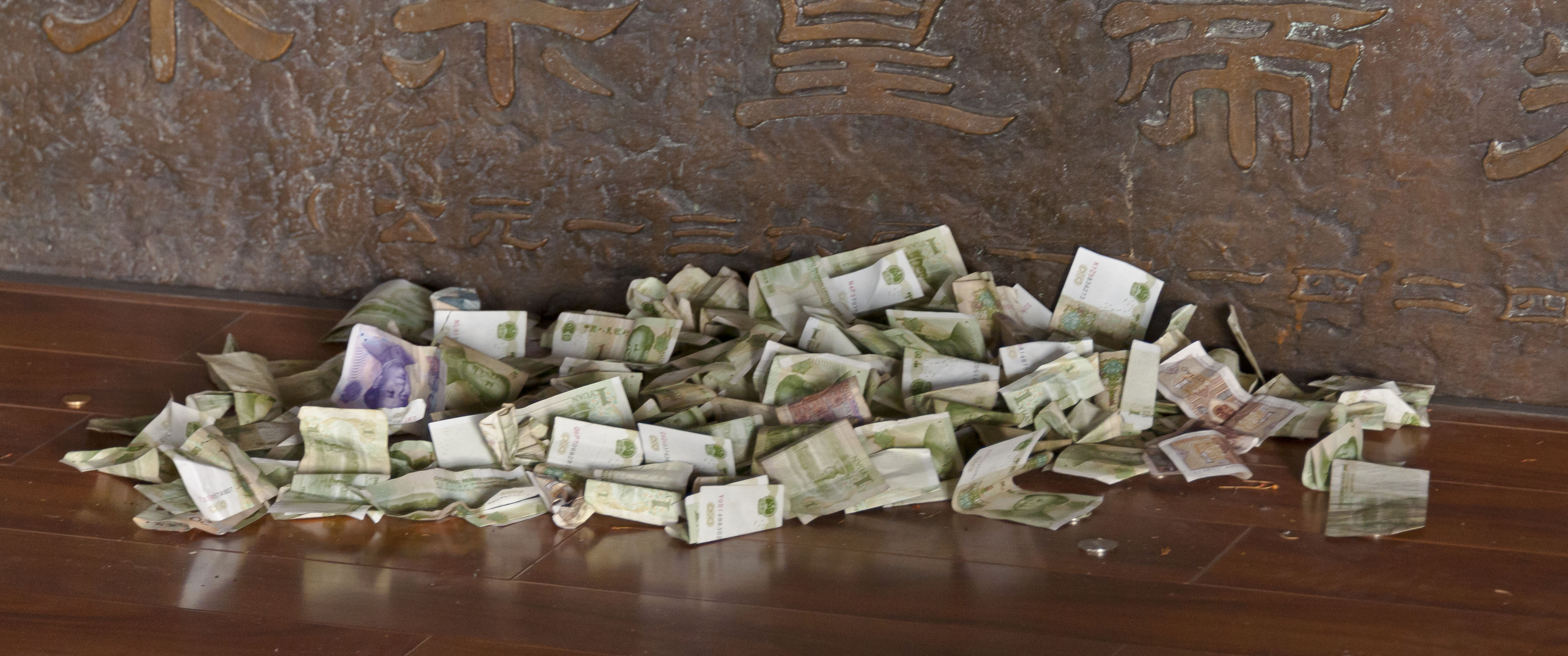
The change in front of the bronze statue of Emperor Yongle Zhu Di at the Ling'en Palace, Ming Dynasty

In January 2016, according to a report by West China City Daily, a hanging coffin from the Three Gorges area exhibited in the Wushan Museum in Chongqing was filled with Renminbi banknotes thrown in by visitors, completely obscuring the ancient human remains inside.

During the Spring Festival in January 2017, hundreds of coins were thrown by visitors into the Yangtze alligator pool and the alligator snapping turtle exhibit pool at Shanghai Zoo. According to interviews conducted by reporters, some tourists were imitating the practice of tossing coins for good luck at temples, hoping to receive blessings from the long-lived animals. However, other tourists threw coins to rouse the less active animals during the winter and test their reactions.

On March 5, 2017, a 20-year-old sea turtle died from suffocation after ingesting coins thrown by tourists at Hunan Martyr's Park Aquarium, Changsha City.

=== Coins thrown into airplane engines ===
On June 27, 2017, a China Southern Airlines flight from Shanghai Pudong Airport to Guangzhou was delayed when an elderly woman in her eighties was spotted tossing coins into the aircraft's engine for good luck during boarding. This incident garnered significant social attention after being reported. A commentary in the Beijing News compared coin-tossing for blessings to the medieval Catholic Church's practice of selling indulgences, arguing that both share a similar logic and are essentially bad habits that violate order and rules.

On July 27, 2017, when boarding a Shenzhen Airlines flight from Nanning with a stopover in Wuhan en route to Shenyang, a man stood on the boarding stairs and threw coins towards the direction of the aircraft engine. Subsequently, the flight was canceled for aircraft inspection. The individual Li's actions necessitated aircraft maintenance, leading to flight cancellation and passenger delays, and resulting in an economic loss exceeding 70,000 yuan. Shenzhen Airlines sued Li, seeking full compensation for the economic loss. After two trials the two parties reached a settlement, with Li agreeing to compensate the airline with over 50,000 yuan.

On October 18, 2017, during Lucky Air flight 8L9960 from Anqing to Kunming, a passenger at Anqing Airport threw an object towards the aircraft's engine. Airport maintenance staff promptly stopped the person and thoroughly inspected the aircraft, finding a coin on ground near the engine. The police detained and investigated the involved passenger. To ensure flight safety, Lucky Air canceled all its flights for the day and conducted a comprehensive engine inspection. On February 17, 2019, during Lucky Air flight 8L9960 from Anqing to Kunming, personnel conducting a pre-flight check discovered two coins near the left engine. Following inquiries made over the in-flight broadcast, a 28-year-old male passenger admitted having thrown coins for luck. This incident resulted in direct economic losses exceeding 140,000 yuan. On March 10, Lucky Air flight 8L9616 from Jinan to Chengdu encountered a similar incident. During boarding at Jinan, flight attendants observed two female passengers tossing coins outside the jet bridge. The passengers involved were promptly handed over to airport security, and the incident caused a two-hour flight delay.

On April 2, 2019, at Wuhan Tianhe International Airport, a man, following his mother-in-law's advice, threw three coins from the boarding bridge toward the ground beneath for "good luck," causing a 30-minute delay for over a hundred passengers. The man was subsequently detained for 10 days as an administrative penalty.

On April 16, 2019, while boarding Tianjin Airlines flight GS6681 from Hohhot to Chifeng, a 66-year-old passenger threw six coins towards the aircraft engine for good luck from near the boarding stair car. She was subsequently given a 10-day administrative detention.

On April 20, 2019, China Southern Airlines flight CZ8427 from Nanning to Bangkok was delayed because a passenger tossed six coins toward the aircraft's nose at the door-bridge junction. All coins were recovered, but the flight was delayed by 78 minutes for the inspection. The passenger was subsequently detained by police.

On June 4, 2019, a warning sign at Sanya Phoenix Airport stating "Throwing coins at an aircraft for good luck is an illegal act that jeopardizes safety and harms your own blessings" has appeared online, sparking renewed public discussion.

On October 29, 2023, at 9:00 a.m., during boarding for China Southern Airlines flight CZ3121 from Guangzhou Baiyun to Beijing Daxing, maintenance staff spotted a passenger throwing coins towards the aircraft. Immediate safety checks were conducted, and two coins were found near the belly of the aircraft. Subsequently, China Southern Airlines conducted a comprehensive inspection, which caused the delay of the flight. The passenger involved was taken away by airport police for further investigation.

On March 6, 2024, China Southern Airlines flight CZ8805 from Sanya to Beijing was delayed by 4 hours because a passenger threw coins toward the aircraft. The individual involved was taken away by airport police for investigation.

=== Remedial measures ===
Attitudes towards tourists' coin tossing behavior vary among different non-religious scenic spots. The Ming Tombs Scenic Area takes a stance of neither encouraging nor prohibiting this behavior, implementing a set of regulations known as the "Tourist Coin Tossing Management Regulations" to govern the handling of coins tossed by visitors. Staff at the scenic area conduct centralized cleaning after closing hours, typically collecting and counting coins every 10 days during peak season and every 15 days during off-peak season, resulting in an annual collection of over a hundred thousands Yuan. According to the scenic area's regulations, this money cannot be used for staff salaries or bonuses but can be utilized for infrastructure development within the scenic area and for small-scale restoration projects not covered by national cultural heritage preservation funds. On the other hand, Yonghe Temple in Beijing considers coin tossing disruptive to the order of the scenic area and highly damaging to artifacts. To protect the cultural relics, the management of Yonghe Temple has installed fences, cautionary lines, warning signs, and even glass covers around the artifacts. However, these measures have not yielded ideal results.

== Western countries ==
The Trevi Fountain in Rome is known for a custom where people toss coins for good luck. According to legend, throwing a coin into the Trevi Fountain ensures that travelers will return to Rome one day. Approximately €3,000 are thrown into the fountain each day. In 2016, an estimated $1.5 million worth of coins were collected from the fountain. These coins are used to fund a charity supermarket in Rome. Attempts to retrieve the coins from the fountain are illegal, still, there have been occasional efforts to do so. There have been reports that the mayor of Rome once considered using the coins from the fountain to pay off the city's debts.

In Las Vegas, luck is crucial to many visitors and many coins are tossed into fountains. While some of these coins are retrieved by passersby or lost in drainage systems, the majority are collected and donated to charity. The Bellagio Hotel alone donates around $12,000 annually from the coins collected from its musical fountain.

== India ==
Indians often throw coins into sacred rivers like the Ganges and Yamuna. Many people follow this tradition without knowing its origins, believing that throwing coins into the river brings blessings. However, some analyses suggest that this custom began because rivers were vital sources of drinking water in ancient India. Ancient Indian coins were frequently made of copper or copper alloys, and copper has disinfectant properties. Thus, throwing copper coins into the river was believed to help maintain the cleanliness of the water, making it safer for drinking.

Collecting coins from rivers is permitted. Due to the prevalence of steel coins in modern India, many impoverished individuals use magnets to gather coins from riverbeds, while others dive directly into severely polluted rivers like the Ganges for this purpose.

== Thailand ==
In March 2017, a 25-year-old turtle in a pond in Thonburi, Thailand, developed a swollen stomach which caused a cracked shell due to ingesting a large quantity of coins tossed into the water by visitors seeking good luck. The turtle underwent surgery to remove 915 coins weighing 5 kilograms. Unfortunately, it succumbed to post-operative complications two weeks later. After its death, the turtle was preserved and is now on display at Chulalongkorn University. On June 14, the university held a traditional Buddhist ceremony for its spiritual benefit.

== Japan ==
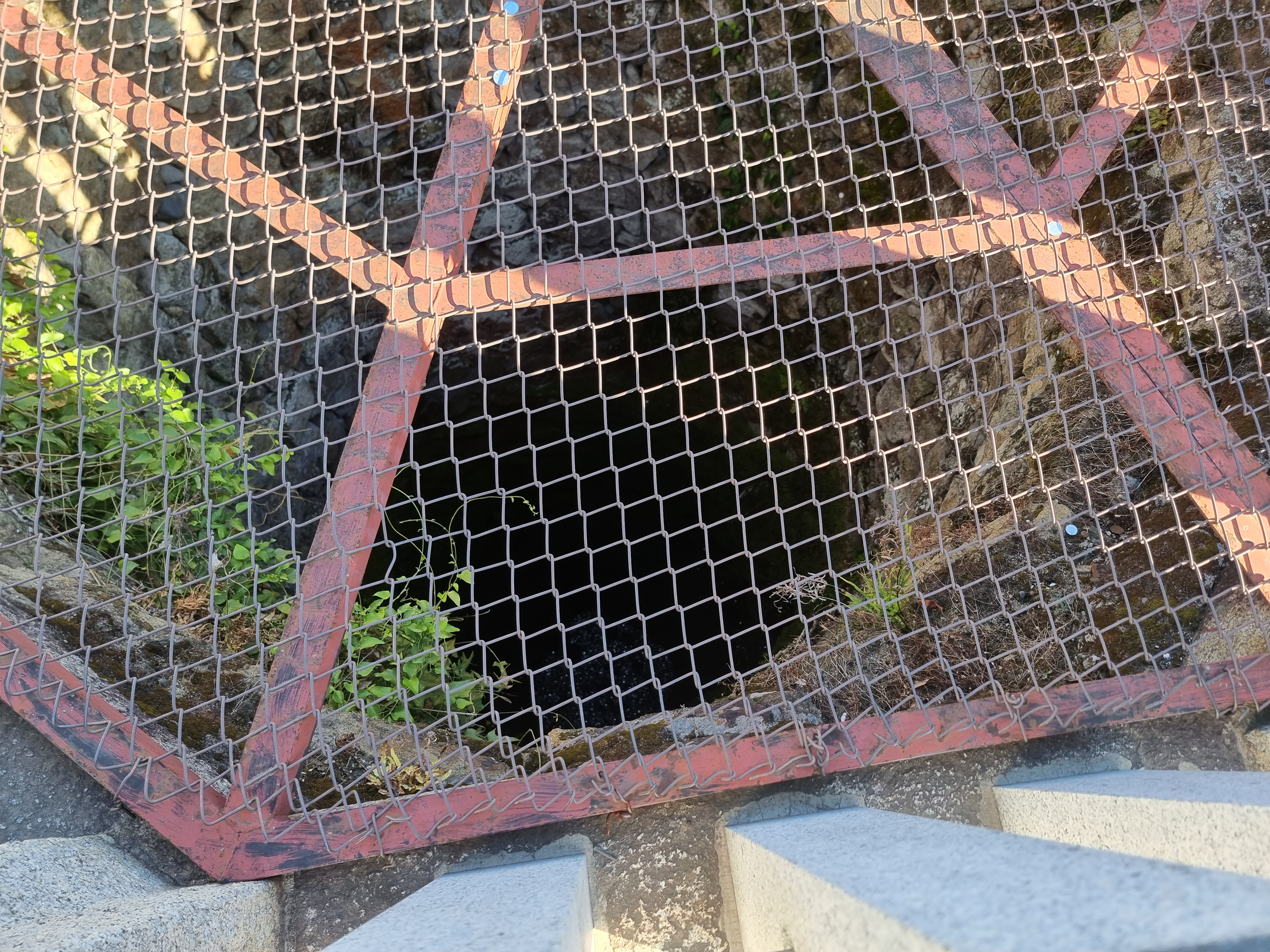
Outside the well

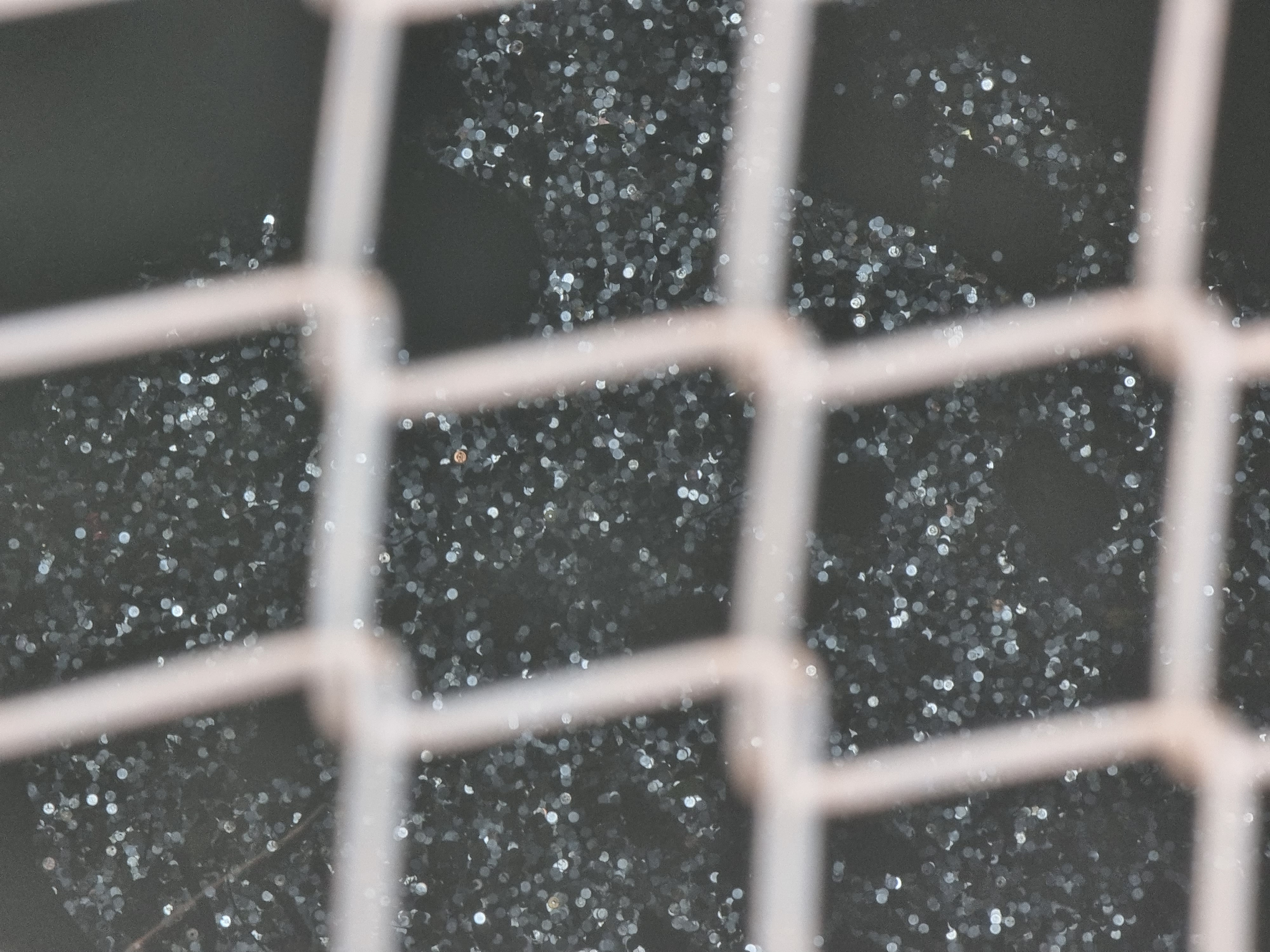
Bottom of well

Coins thrown into the well at Himeji Castle.

In Japan, due to the auspicious pronunciation of "goen" (meaning fate or destiny), the 5-yen coin is often referred to as "fukusen" or "lucky money." Many tourist attractions have designated areas for washing these "lucky coins." In Japanese tradition, there is a custom of offering money (known as "saisen") to temples and shrines, typically by placing coins in offertory boxes, often using 5-yen coins. However, throwing coins into ponds was not traditionally common. With the increase in foreign tourists, many ponds at tourist sites have accumulated large amounts of coins. Despite some locations prohibiting the throwing of coins into their ponds, many foreign visitors still engage in this practice. For example, at the Oshino Hakkai ponds near Mount Fuji, authorities retrieved 6,300 yen in 1-yen coins, 27,025 yen in other denominations, along with 307 coins of RMB and Hong Kong dollars in July 2015.

== See also ==
- Jew with a coin
- Amulet
