= Oshino, Yamanashi =

Oshino 忍野村
- Village
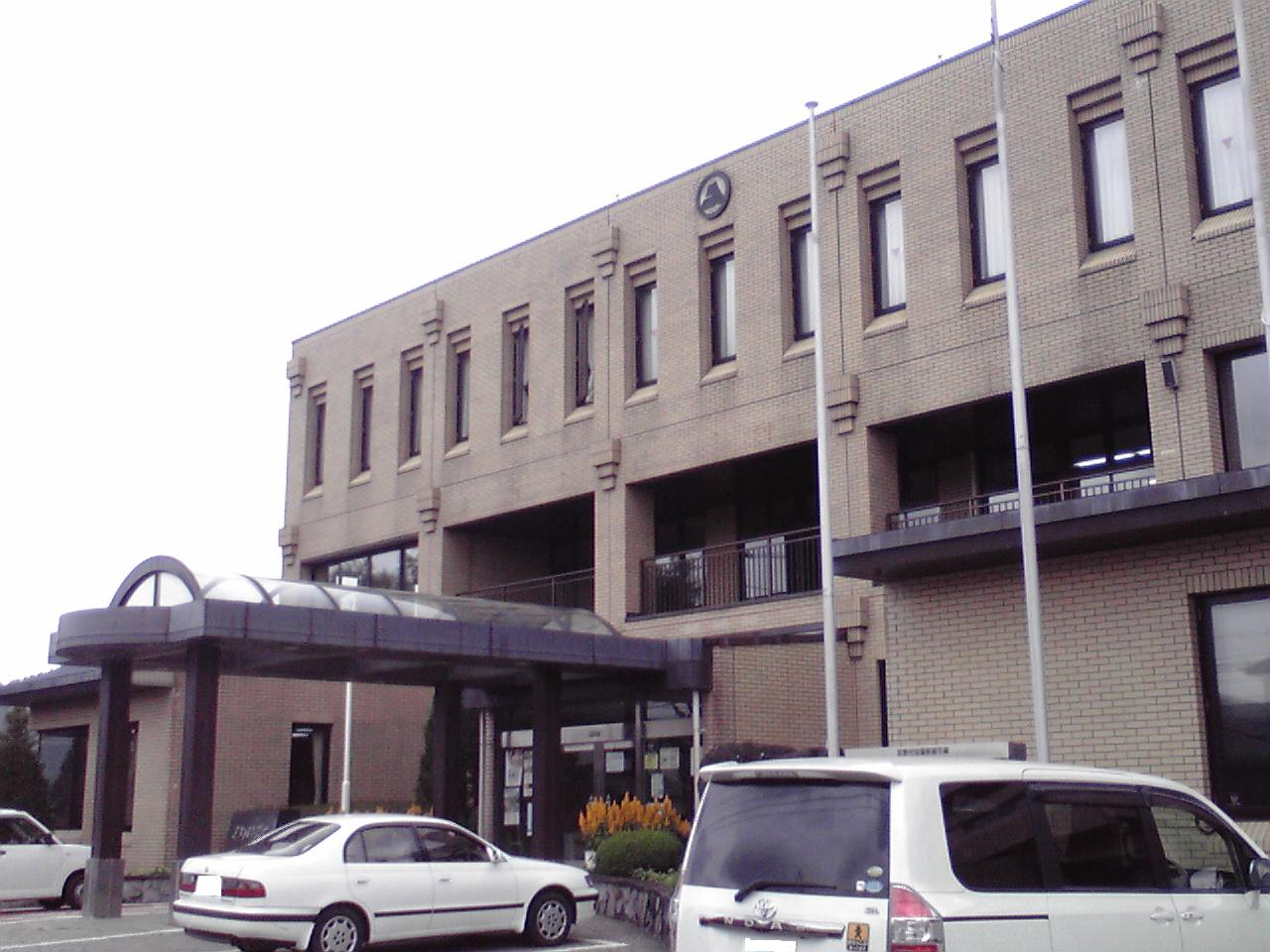
- Oshino Village Office

- Flag Seal

- Location of Oshino in Yamanashi Prefecture

- Coordinates: 35°27′36.1″N 138°50′52.3″E
- Country: Japan
- Region: Chūbu; Tōkai
- Prefecture: Yamanashi Prefecture
- District: Minamitsuru

Area
  - Total: 25.05 km^{2} (9.67 sq mi)

Population (May 31, 2015)
  - Total: 9,710
  - Density: 388/km^{2} (1,000/sq mi)
- Time zone: UTC+9 (Japan Standard Time)
- Symbols
  - Tree: Taxus cuspidata
  - Flower: Rose
  - Bird: Barn swallow
  - Mammal: Squirrel
- Phone number: 0555-84-3111
- Address: 1514 Shinobugusa Oshino-mura Minimitsuru-gun, Yamanashi-ken 401-0511
- Website: Official website

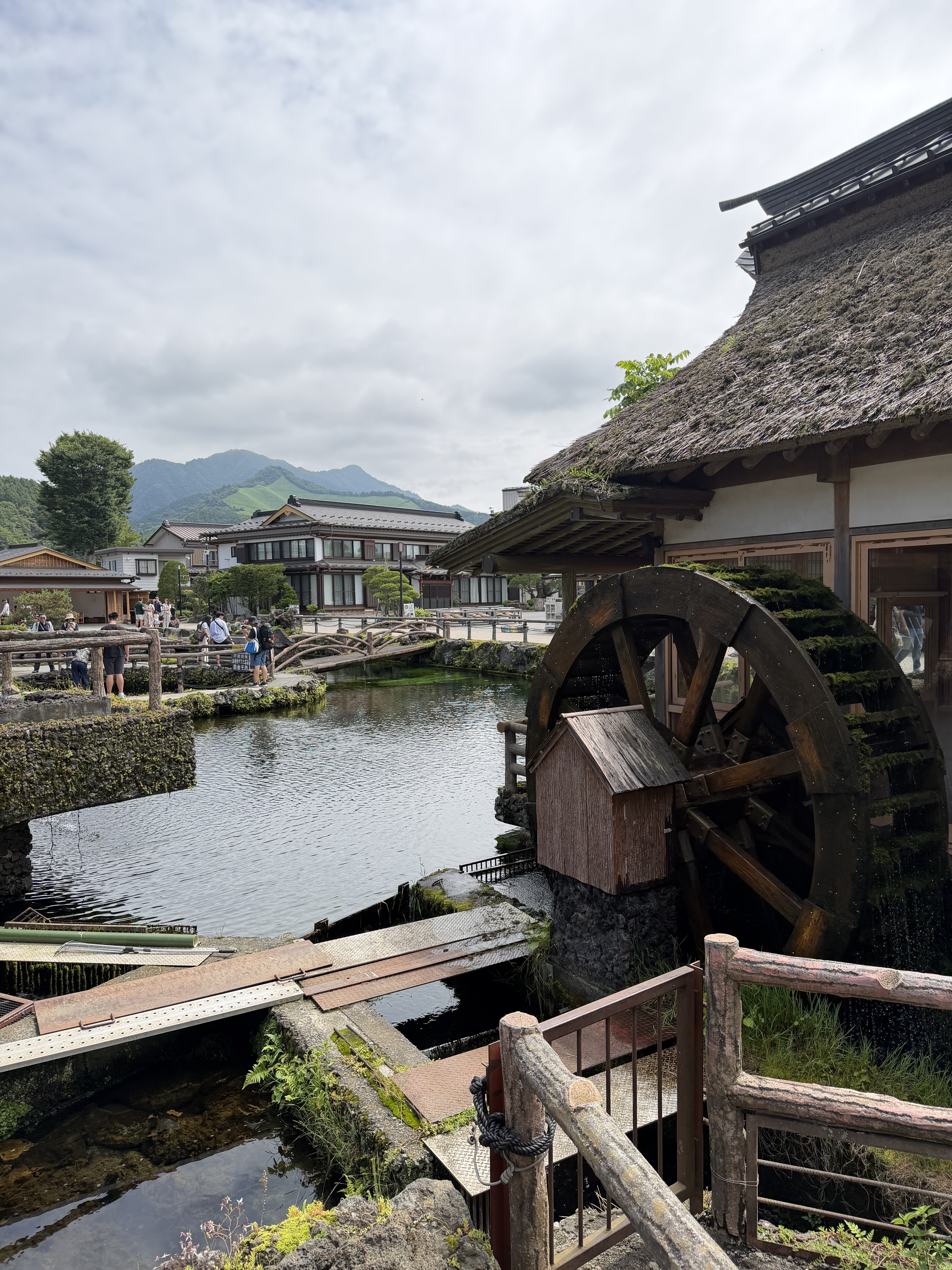
Water wheel in Nigori-ike Pond

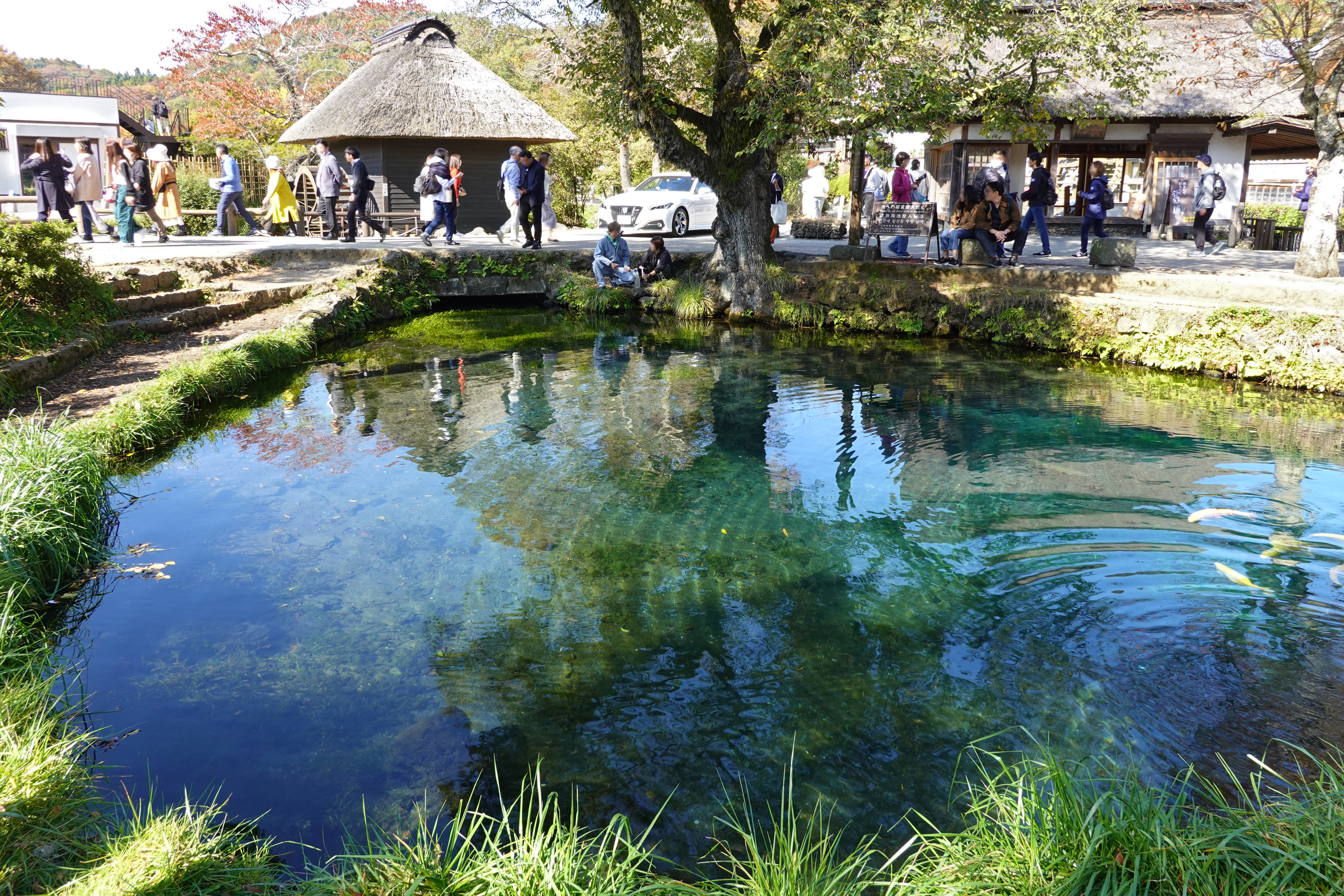
Oshino Hakkai

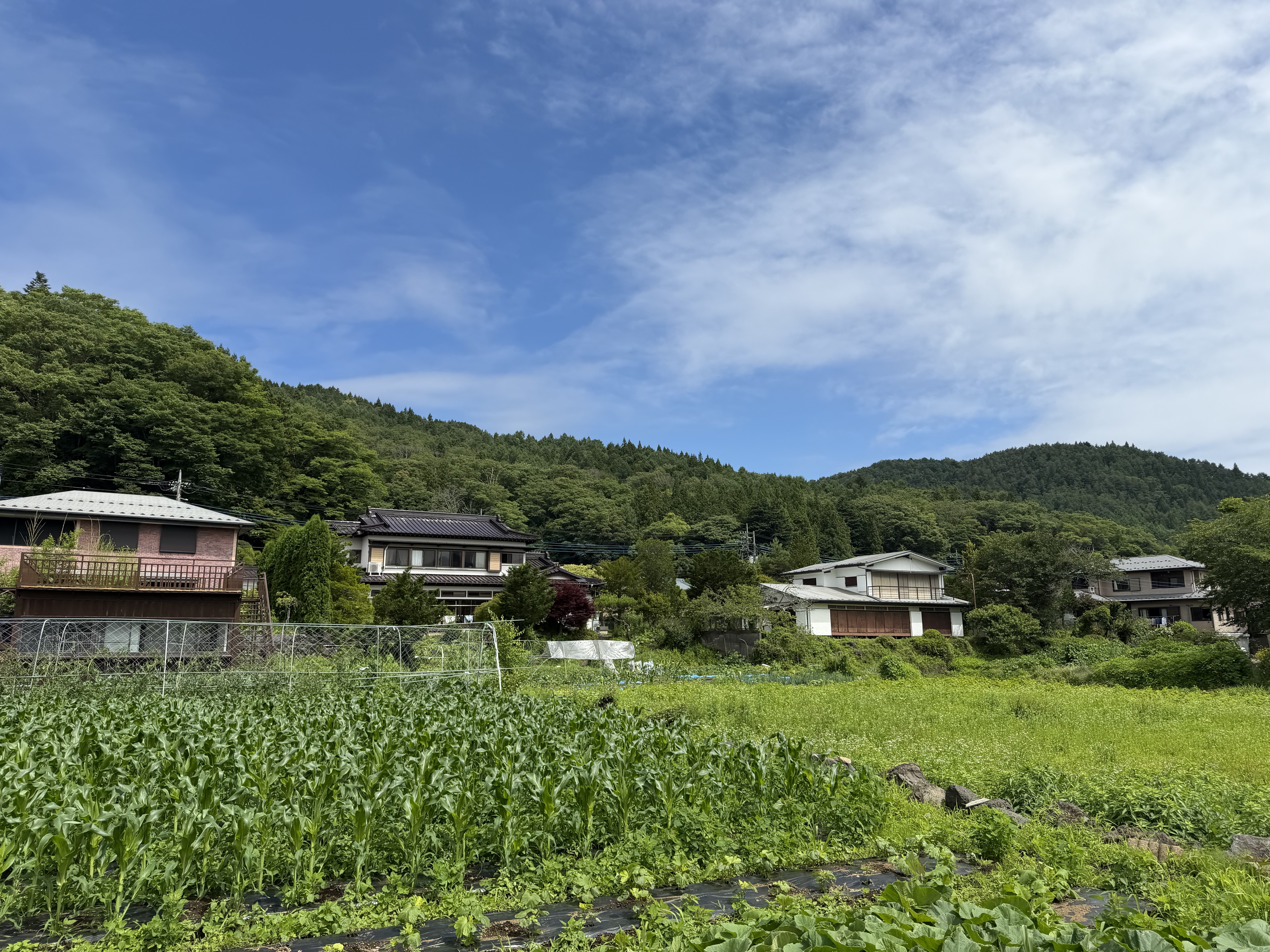
Houses behind a farm in Oshino, Yamanashi

Oshino (忍野村, Oshino-mura) is a village in Yamanashi Prefecture, Japan. As of 30 September 2020, the village has an estimated population of 9,817 in 4236 households, and a population density of 391,8 persons per km^{2}. The total area of the village is 25.05 square kilometres (9.67 sq mi).

== Geography ==
Oshino is located in southeastern Yamanashi Prefecture, in the foothills of Mount Fuji. The village is noted for its abundant spring water from Mount Fuji.

=== Neighboring municipalities ===
- Yamanashi Prefecture
  - Fujiyoshida
  - Tsuru
  - Yamanakako

=== Climate ===
The village has a climate characterized by hot and humid summers, and relatively mild winters (Köppen climate classification Cfb). The average annual temperature in Oshino is 9.4 °C. The average annual rainfall is 1804 mm with September as the wettest month.

== Demographics ==
Per Japanese census data, the population of Oshino has grown steadily over the past 80 years.

Historical population
Year	Pop.	±%
1940	3,284	—
1950	4,590	+39.8%
1960	5,034	+9.7%
1970	5,689	+13.0%
1980	6,077	+6.8%
1990	7,968	+31.1%
2000	8,367	+5.0%
2010	8,635	+3.2%
2020	9,237	+7.0%

== History ==
During the Edo period, all of Kai Province was tenryō territory under direct control of the Tokugawa shogunate. With the establishment of the modern municipalities system in the early Meiji period on April 1, 1889, the village of Oshino was created within Minamitsuru District, Yamanashi Prefecture.

== Economy ==
The world headquarters of FANUC are located in Oshino. The Japan Ground Self-Defense Force Camp Kita-Fuji is located in Oshino.

== Education ==
Oshino has one public elementary school and one public junior high school operated by the village government. The village does not have a high school.

== Transportation ==
=== Railway ===
Oshino is not serviced by rail transportation. The nearest railway station is Fujisan on the Fujikyuko Line in Fujiyoshida.

=== Highway ===
The village is also not serviced by the national highway network.

== Sister cities ==
- Charnay-lès-Mâcon, Saône-et-Loire, Bourgogne, France,

== Local attractions ==
- Oshino Hakkai, the Eight Springs of Mount Fuji
