= Oshino Hakkai =

Springs in Oshino, Yamanashi, Japan

Coordinates: 35.460139°N 138.832889°E

Oshino Hakkai (Japanese: 忍野八海, literally Eight Seas in Oshino) are the eight springs found in Oshino, Yamanashi, Japan. The aquifer water from Mount Fuji comes out to the ground to form these springs. They are a Natural monument of Japan, part of the Mount Fuji World Heritage Site, and one of Yamanashi Prefecture's important tourist attractions.

== Gallery ==
The traditional eight springs are called:

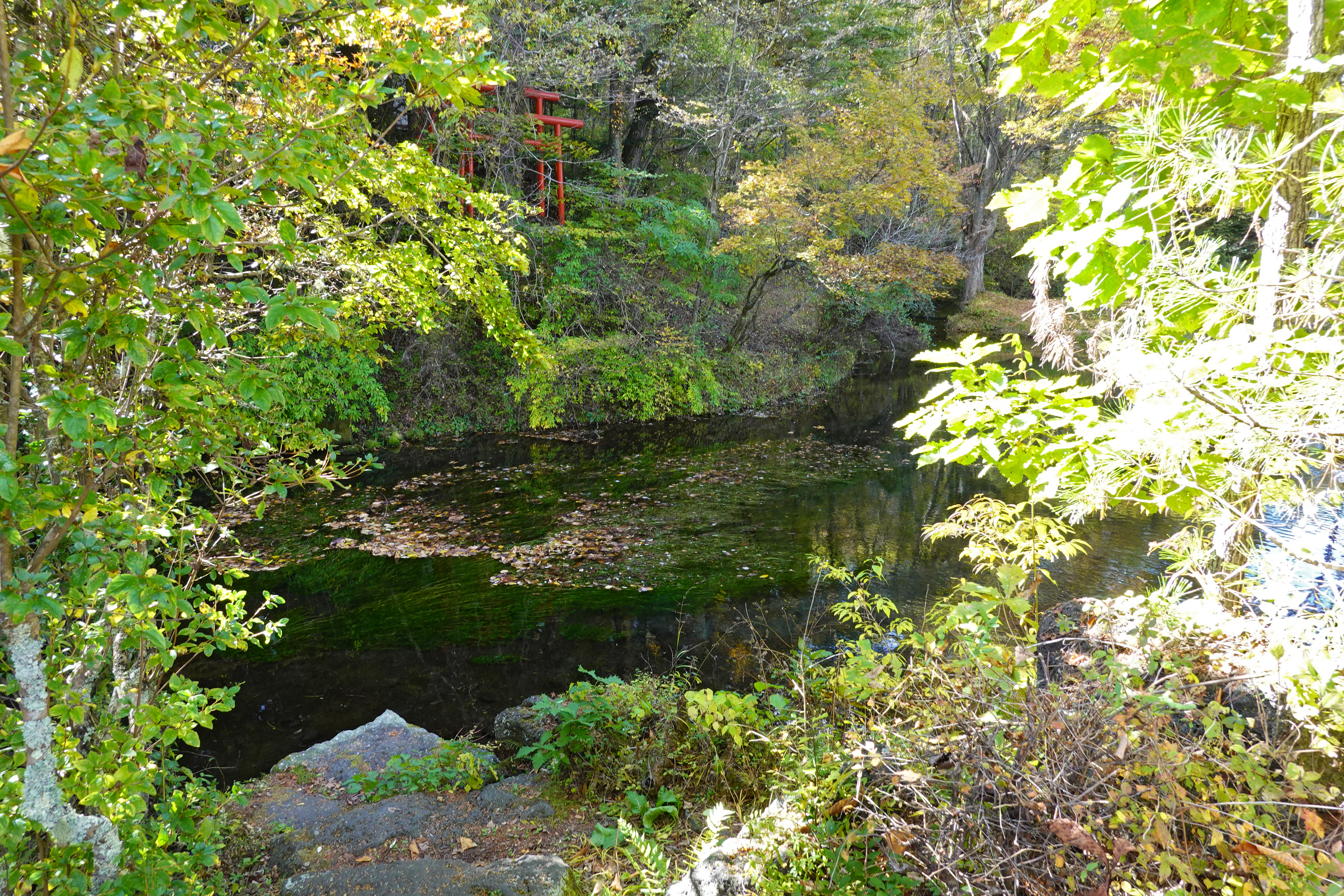
Deguchiike Pond (出口池)

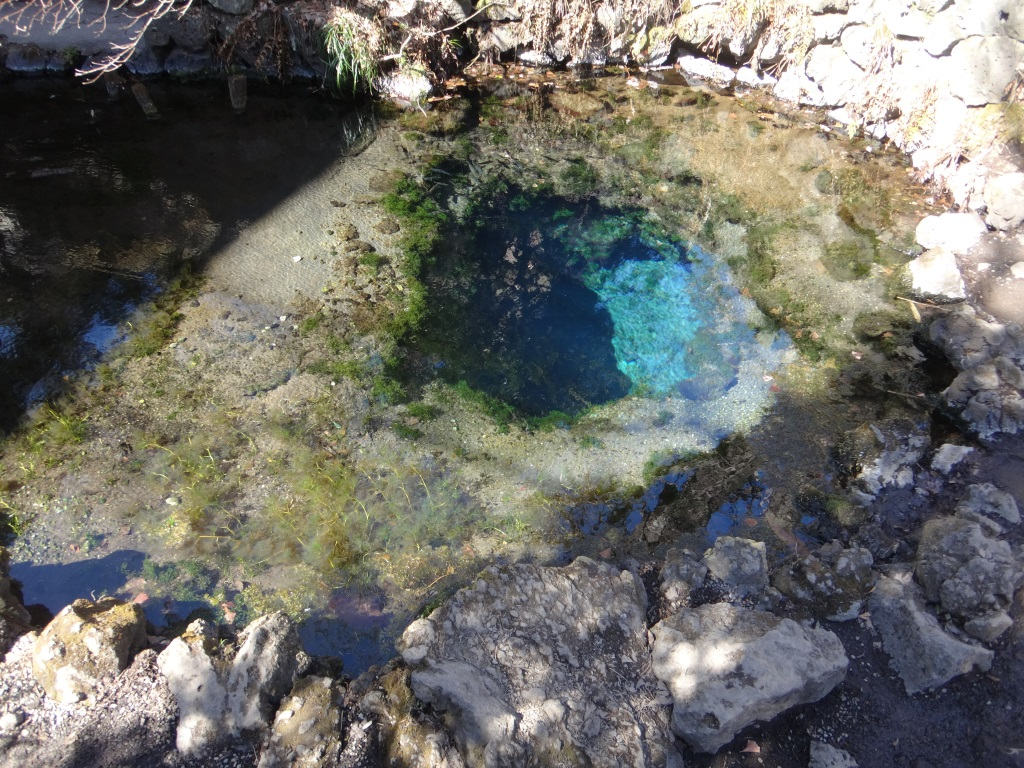
Okamaike Pond (お釜池)

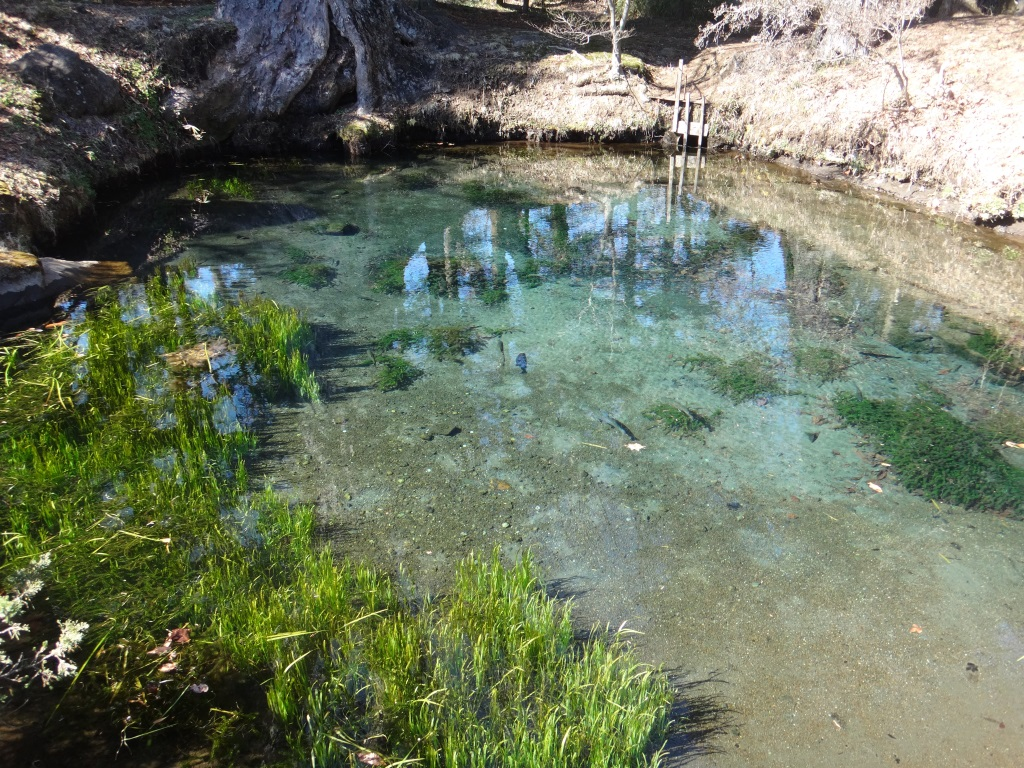
Sokonashiike Pond (底抜池)

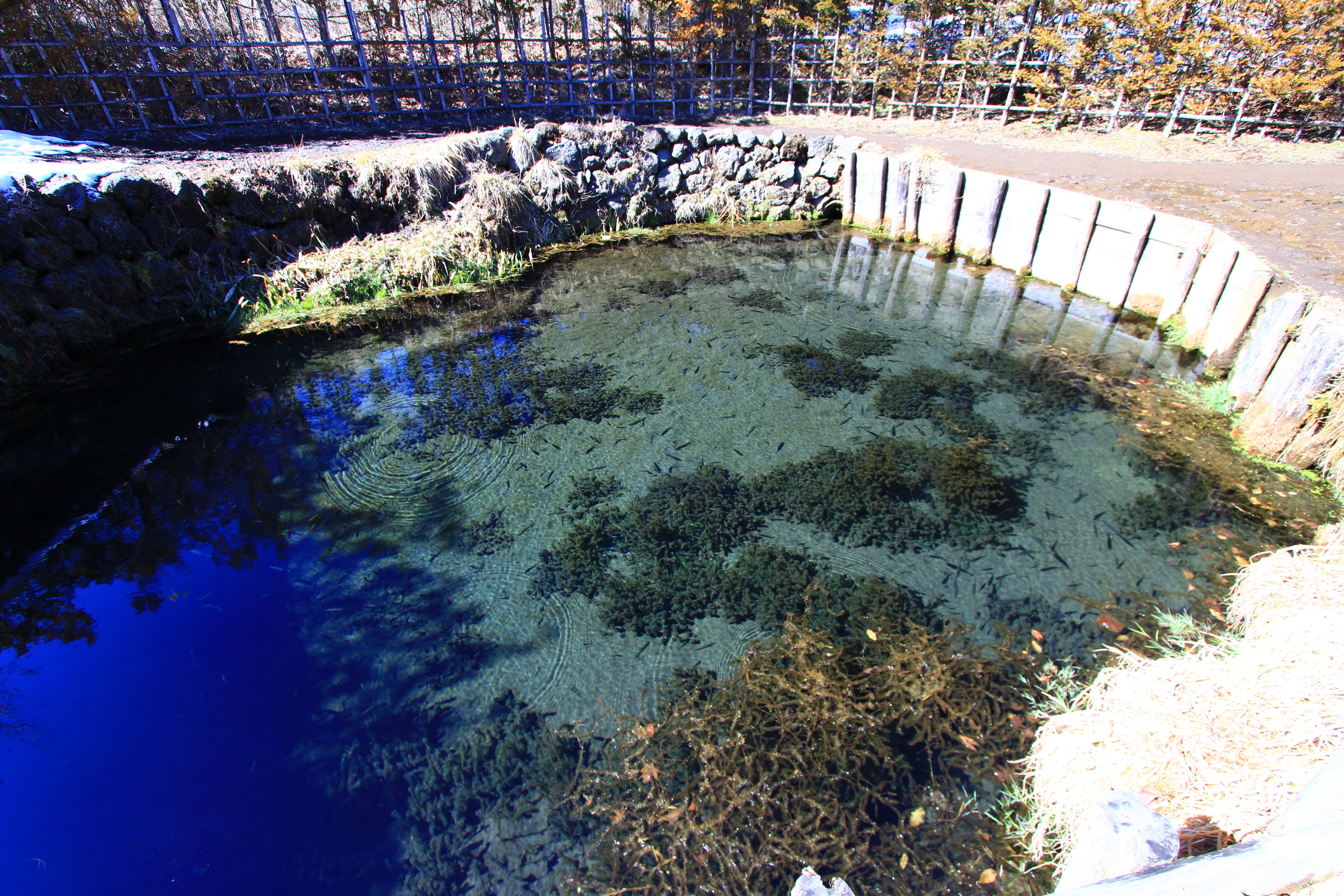
Chōshiike Pond (銚子池)

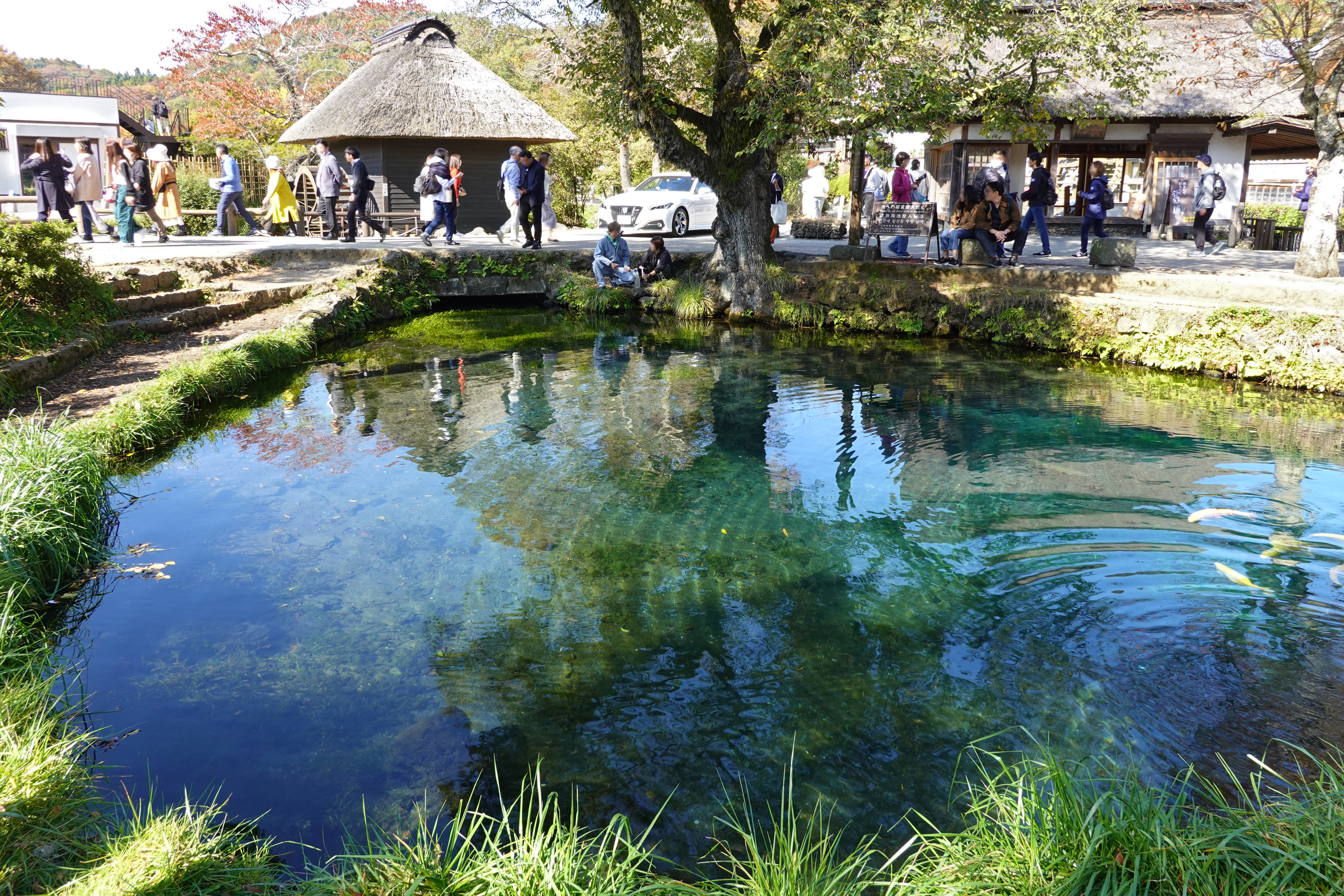
Wakuike Pond (湧池)

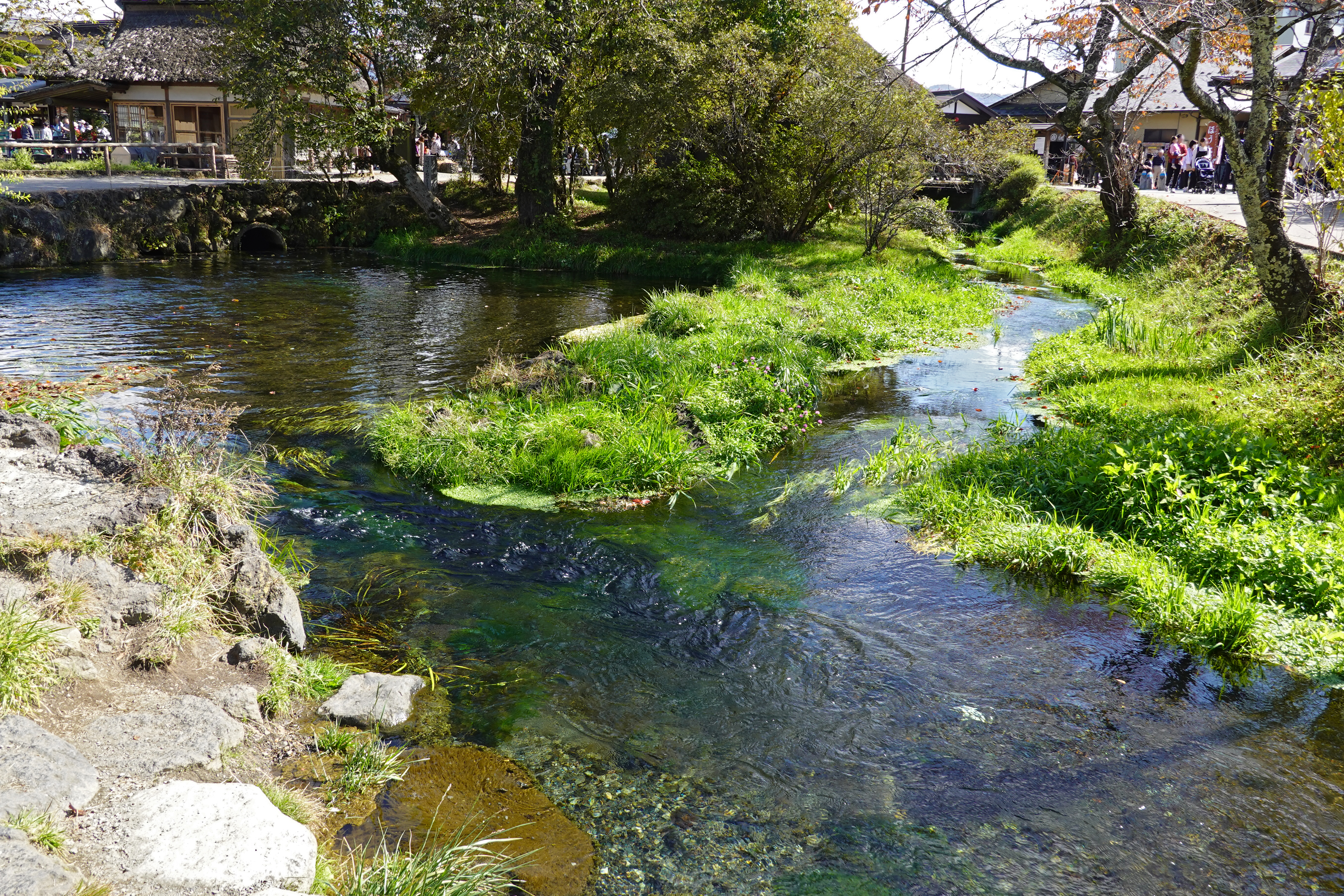
Nigoriike Pond (濁池)

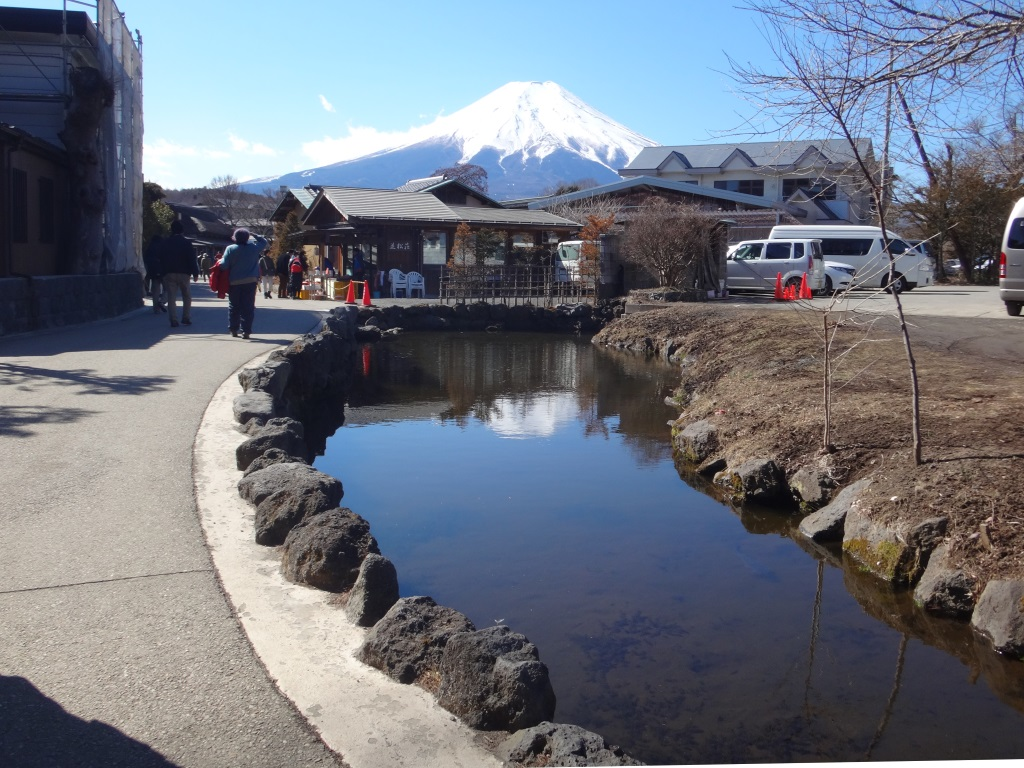
Kagamiike Pond (鏡池)

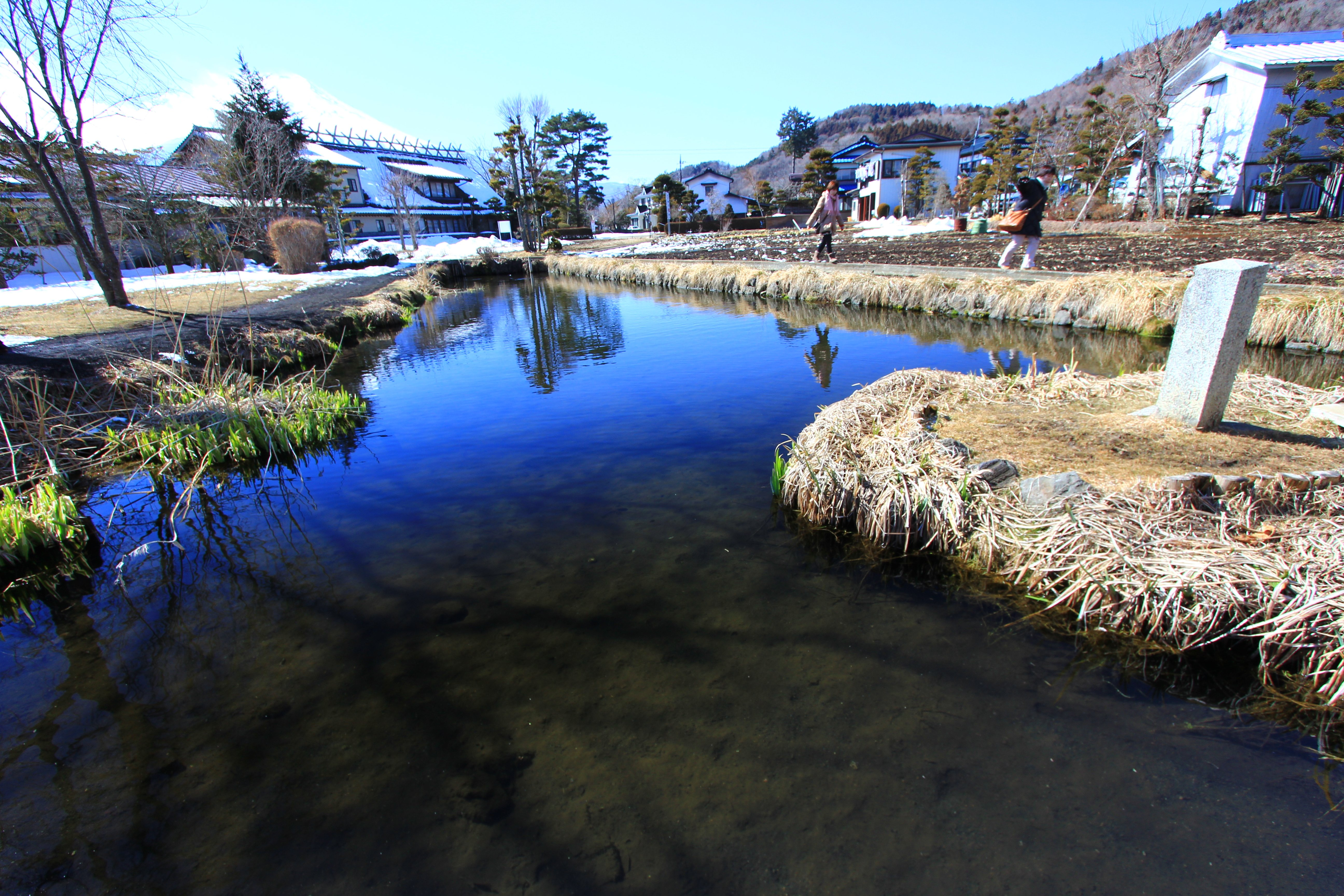
Shōbuike Pond (菖蒲池)

== See also ==
- Fuji Five Lakes
- Fuji-Hakone-Izu National Park
