= Saisen =

Money offered to the gods

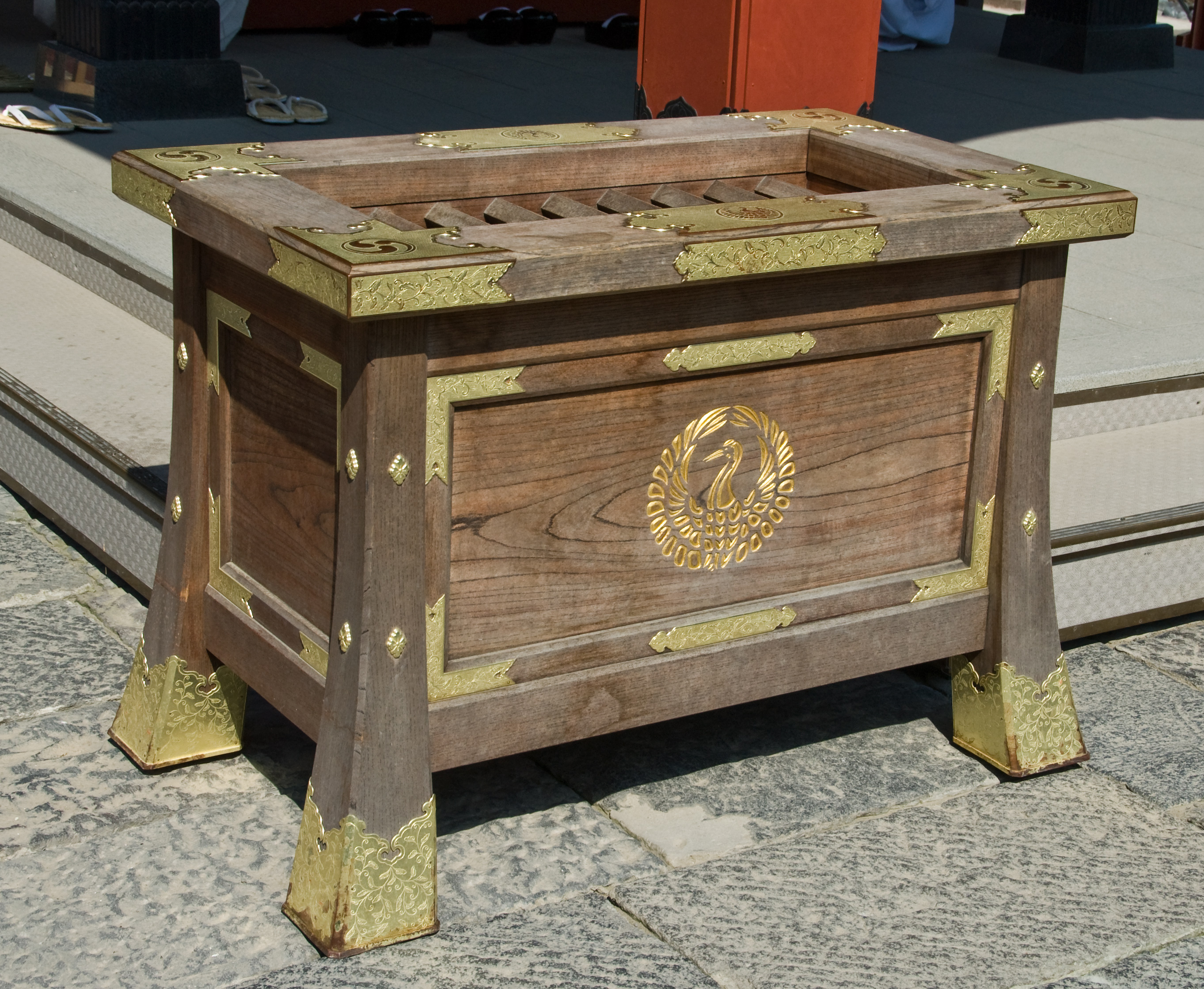
A saisenbako

In Japanese, saisen (賽銭) is money offered to the gods or bodhisattvas. Commonly this money is put in a saisen box (賽銭箱, saisen-bako), a common item at Shinto shrines and Buddhist temples in Japan.

== Form ==
Used to collect offerings, a saisen box is typically a wooden coin box, with a grate for the top cover. This design allows coins to be tossed in, while still preventing the money from being retrieved easily. Some have grates made of round bars, or have borders that slope downward, allowing the money to slide into the box easily.

== Offerings ==
The amount of money offered is usually small, often in coin format. Five yen coins are a popular offering at saisen boxes due to the pun between five yen, go-en (五円), and the concept of an unseen connection between humans who know each other, go-en (御縁).

== Theft ==
Saisen boxes always have locks, but thefts of saisen are on the rise. Some shrine priests have caught thieves in the act, while others take preventive measures by adding covers to the saisen boxes.

== Gallery ==
After offering a small amount of money, Japanese people clasp their hands in prayer.

Saisen-bako at Shinto shrine in Japan

Saisen-bako at small Shinto shrine in Japan

Saisen-bako at Buddhist temples in Japan

== See also ==
- Mite box
- Offertory
- Coins as votive offering

== Citations ==
- Iwanami Kōjien (広辞苑) Japanese dictionary, 6th Edition (2008), DVD version
