= Futamatao Station =

Railway station in Ōme, Tokyo, Japan

JC66 Futamatao Station 二俣尾駅
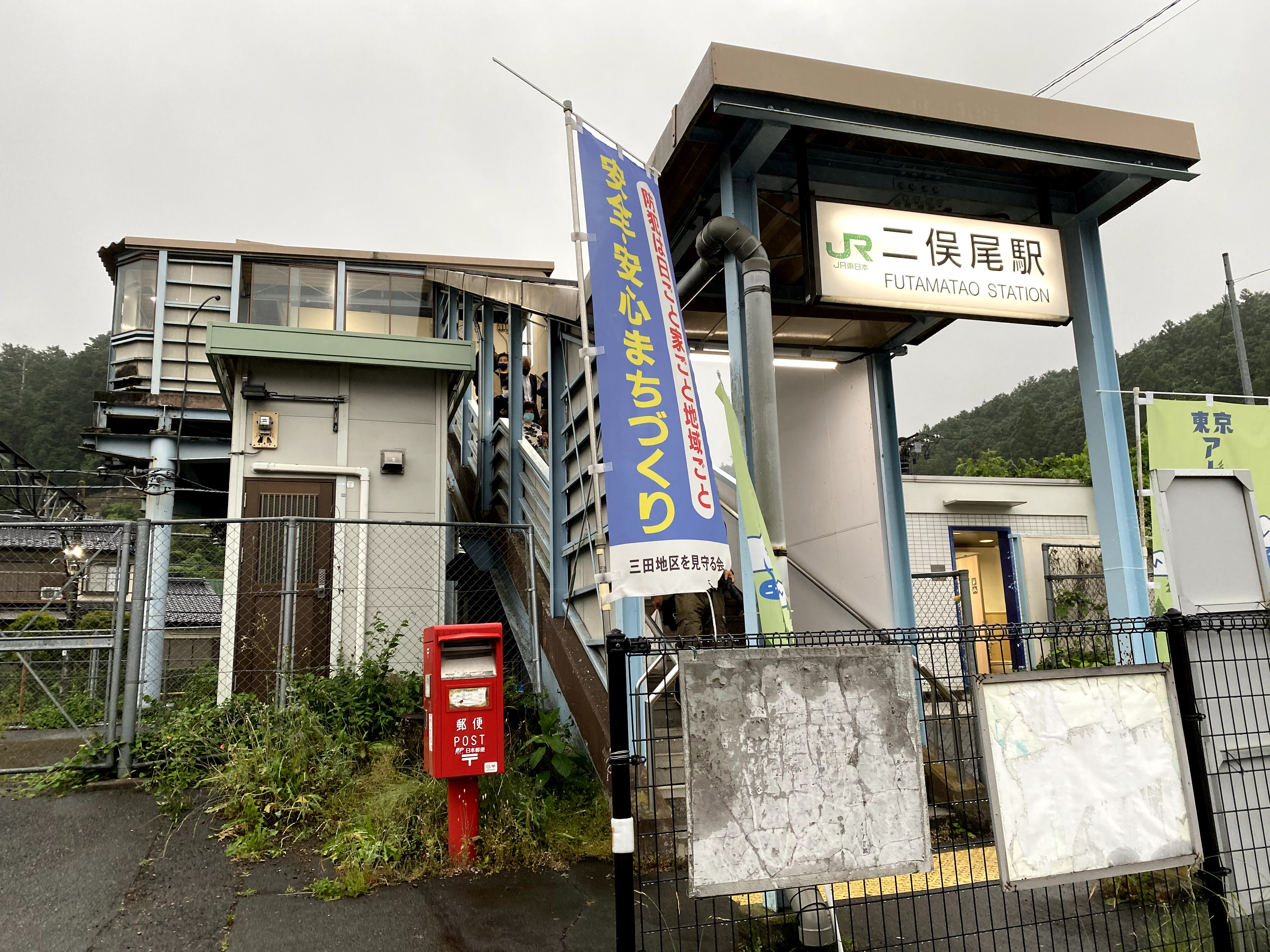
- Futamatao Station in May 2021

General information
- Location: 4-Futamatao, Ōme-shi, Tokyo-to 198-0171; Japan
- Coordinates: 35.8037°N 139.2159°E
- Operator: JR East
- Line: Ōme Line
- Distance: 23.6 km from Tachikawa
- Platforms: 1 island platform
- Tracks: 2

Other information
- Status: Unstaffed
- Station code: JC66
- Website: Official website

History
- Opened: 1 January 1920

Passengers
- FY2014: 475

Services
Preceding station	JR East	Following station
Ikusabata JC67 towards Oku-Tama	Ōme Line Rapid Local	Ishigamimae JC65 towards Tachikawa
Location
- Location within Tokyo Location within Japan

Futamatao Station (二俣尾駅, Futamatao-eki) is a passenger railway station located in the city of Ōme, Tokyo, Japan, operated by East Japan Railway Company (JR East).

== Lines ==
Futamatao Station is served by the Ōme Line, and is located 23.6 kilometers from the starting point of the line at Tachikawa Station.

== Station layout ==
This station consists of a single island platform serving two tracks, connected to the station building by a footbridge. The station is unattended.

=== Platforms ===
(South Exit side)	Ōme Line	for Mitake and Okutama
(North Exit side)	Ōme Line	for Ōme, Tachikawa, Shinjuku, and Tokyo

== History ==
The station opened 1 January 1920 as part of the Ome Electric Railway (青梅電気鉄道). The Ome Electric Railway was nationalized on 1 April 1944, and absorbed into the Japanese National Railways (JNR). With the privatization of Japanese National Railways (JNR) on 1 April 1987, the station came under the control of JR East.

== Passenger statistics ==
In fiscal 2014, the station was used by an average of 475 passengers daily (boarding passengers only).

== Surrounding area ==
- National Route 411
- Tama River
- Yoshikawa Eiji Memorial Museum

== See also ==
- List of railway stations in Japan
