= Ishigamimae Station =

Railway station in Ōme, Tokyo, Japan

JC65 Ishigamimae Station 石神前駅
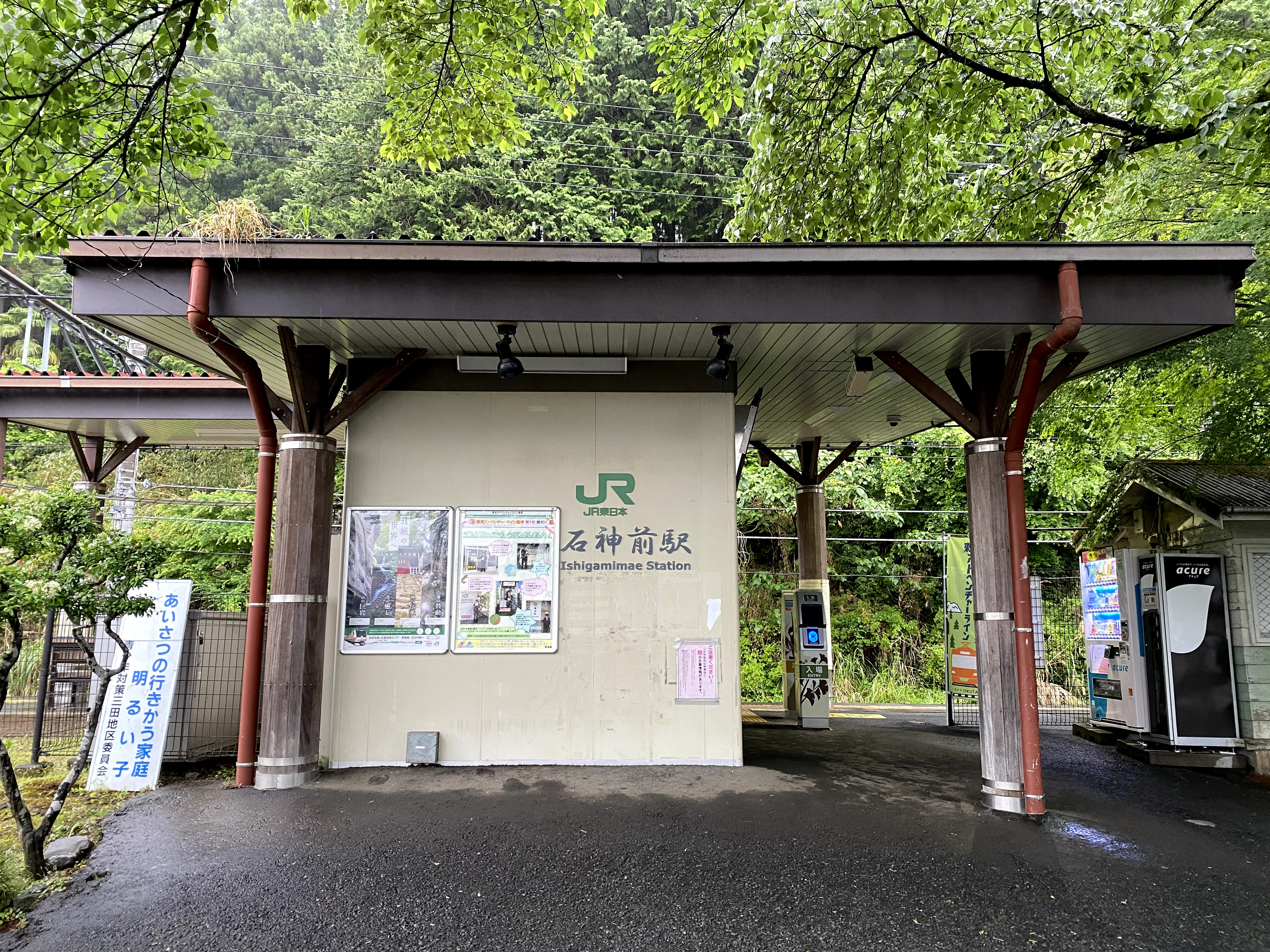
- Station building in May 2021

General information
- Location: 1-Futamatao, Ōme-shi, Tokyo （東京都青梅市二俣尾一丁目） Japan
- Coordinates: 35.7966°N 139.2253°E
- Operator: JR East
- Line: Ōme Line
- Distance: 22.4 km from Tachikawa
- Platforms: 1 side platform

Other information
- Status: Unstaffed
- Station code: JC65
- Website: Official website

History
- Opened: 13 October 1928
- Former names: Rakuraku-en (to 1944); Mitamura (to 1947)

Passengers
- FY2010: 301

Services
Preceding station	JR East	Following station
Futamatao JC66 towards Oku-Tama	Ōme Line Rapid Local	Hinatawada JC64 towards Tachikawa
Location
- Location within Tokyo Location within Japan

Ishigamimae Station (石神前駅, Ishigamimae-eki) is a passenger railway station located in the city of Ōme, Tokyo, Japan, operated by the East Japan Railway Company (JR East).

== Lines ==
Ishigamimae Station is served by the Ōme Line, located 22.4 kilometers from the terminus of the line at Tachikawa Station.

== Station layout ==
This station consists of a single side platform serving a single bi-directional track. The station is unattended.

=== Platform ===
/	Ōme Line	for Mitake and Okutama for Ōme, Tachikawa, Shinjuku, and Tokyo

== History ==
The station opened on 13 October 1928 as the Rakuraku-en stop (楽々園停留場). It was nationalized on 1 April 1944 and was renamed Mitamura Station (三田村駅) at that time. It was renamed to its present name on 1 March 1947. It became part of the East Japan Railway Company (JR East) with the breakup of the Japanese National Railways in 1987.

== Passenger statistics ==
In fiscal 2010, the station was used by an average of 504 passengers daily (boarding passengers only).

== Surrounding area ==
- National Route 411
- Tama River

== See also ==
- List of railway stations in Japan
