= Ikusabata Station =

Railway station in Ōme, Tokyo, Japan

JC67 Ikusabata Station 軍畑駅
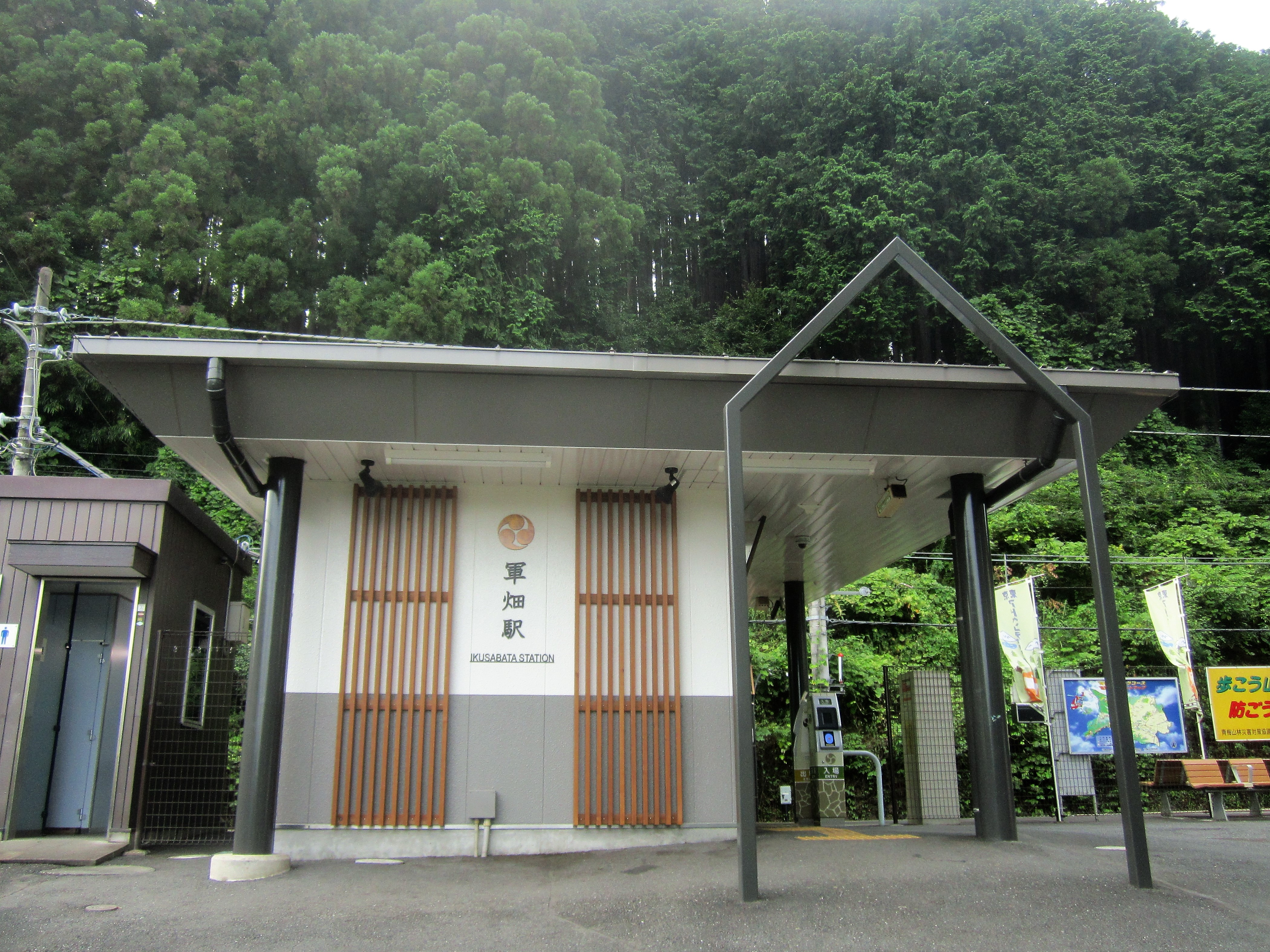
- Ikusabata Station entrance, August 2020

General information
- Location: 1-Sawai, Ōme-shi, Tokyo-to 198-0172; Japan
- Coordinates: 35.8075°N 139.2074°E
- Operator: JR East
- Line: Ōme Line
- Distance: 24.5 km from Tachikawa
- Platforms: 1 side platform

Other information
- Status: Unstaffed
- Station code: JC67
- Website: Official website

History
- Opened: 1 September 1929

Passengers
- FY2010: 238

Services
Preceding station	JR East	Following station
Sawai JC68 towards Oku-Tama	Ōme Line Rapid Local	Futamatao JC66 towards Tachikawa
Location
- Location within Tokyo Location within Japan

Ikusabata Station (軍畑駅, Ikusabata-eki) is a passenger railway station located in the city of Ōme, Tokyo, Japan, operated by the East Japan Railway Company (JR East).

== Lines ==
Ikusabata Station is served by the Ōme Line, located 24.5 kilometers from the terminus of the line at Tachikawa Station.

== Station layout ==
The station has one side platform serving a single bi-directional track. The station is unattended.

=== Platform ===
/	Ōme Line	for Mitake and Okutama for Ōme, Tachikawa, Shinjuku, and Tokyo

== History ==
The station opened on 1 September 1929. It was nationalized on 1 April 1944. It became part of the East Japan Railway Company (JR East) with the breakup of the Japanese National Railways on 1 April 1987.

== Passenger statistics ==
In fiscal 2010, the station was used by an average of 238 passengers daily (boarding passengers only).

== Surrounding area ==
- National Route 411
- Tama River

== See also ==
- List of railway stations in Japan
