= Sawai Station =

Railway station in Ōme, Tokyo, Japan

JC68 Sawai Station 沢井駅
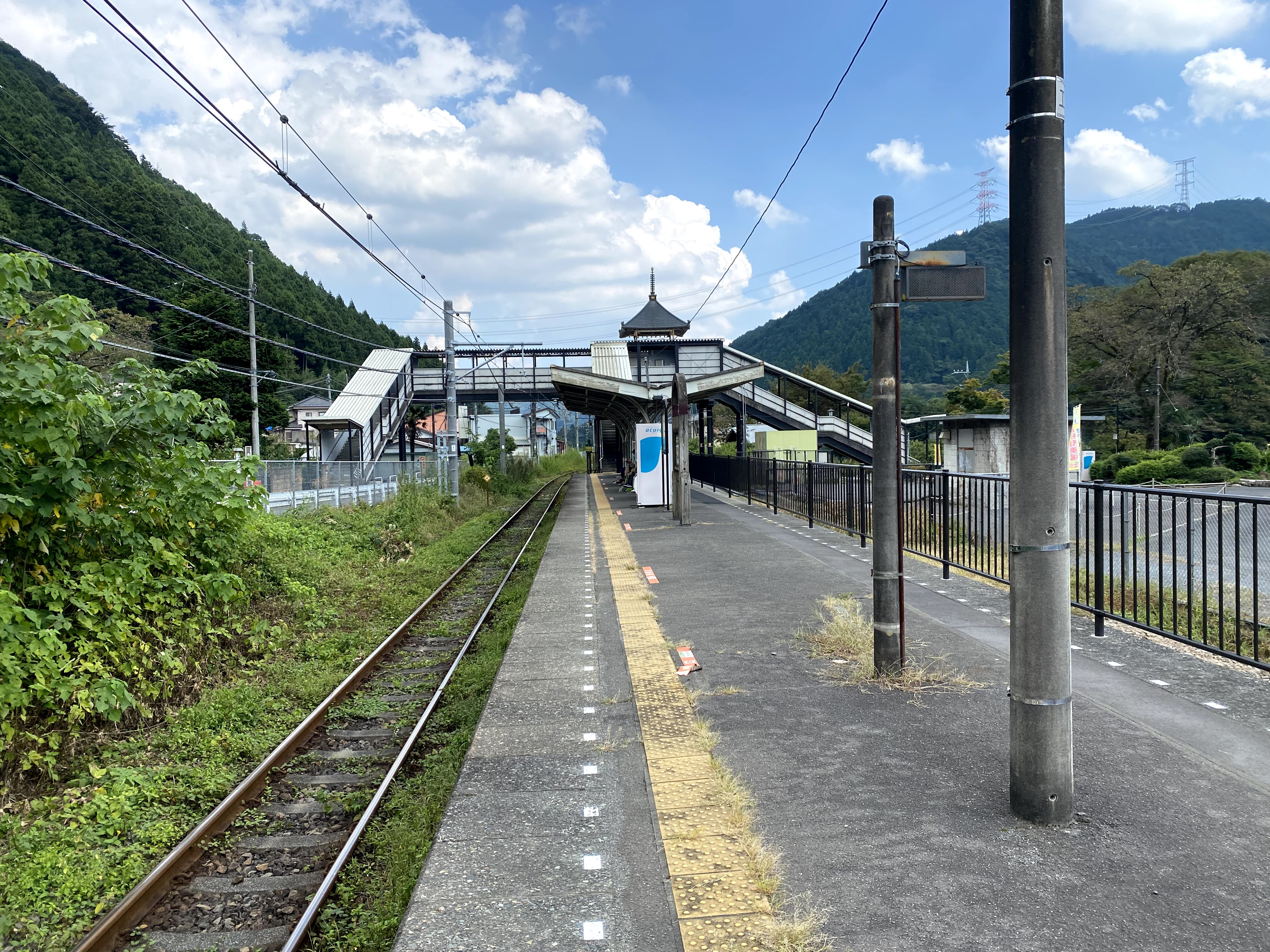
- Platform view, looking east, September 2021

General information
- Location: Sawai 2-chōme, Ōme-shi, Tokyo-to 198-0172; Japan
- Coordinates: 35°48′21″N 139°11′36″E
- Operator: JR East
- Line: Ōme Line
- Distance: 25.9 km from Tachikawa
- Platforms: 1 island platform

Other information
- Status: Unstaffed
- Station code: JC68
- Website: Official website

History
- Opened: 1 September 1929

Passengers
- FY2010: 274

Services
Preceding station	JR East	Following station
Mitake JC69 towards Oku-Tama	Ōme Line Rapid Local	Ikusabata JC67 towards Tachikawa
Location
- Location within Tokyo Location within Japan

Sawai Station (沢井駅, Sawai-eki) is a passenger railway station located in the city of Ōme, Tokyo, Japan, operated by the East Japan Railway Company (JR East).

== Lines ==
Sawai Station is served by the Ōme Line, located 25.9 kilometers from the terminus of the line at Tachikawa Station.

== Station layout ==
This station consists of a single platform and a single track. The station is unstaffed.

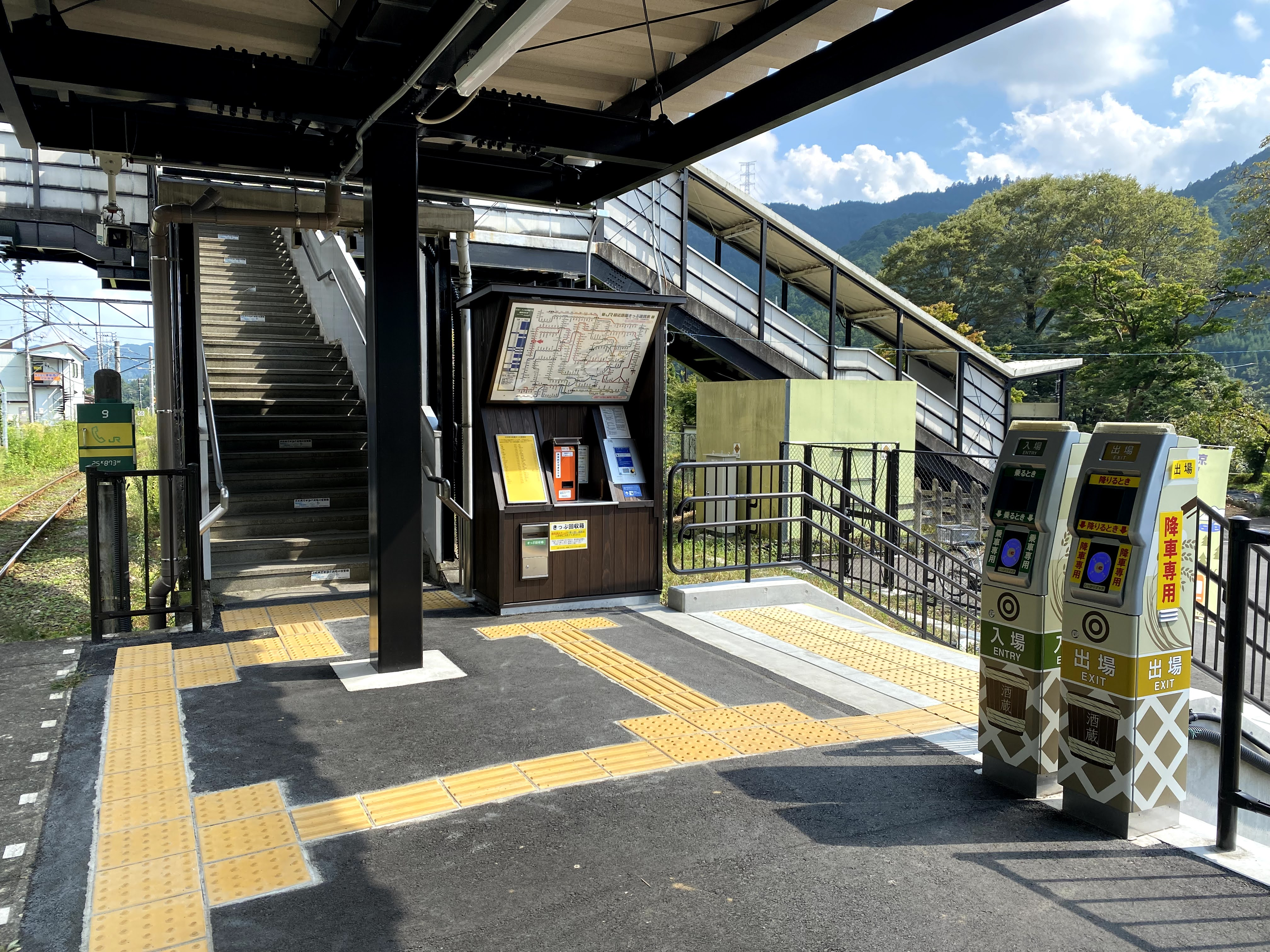
Ticket gate

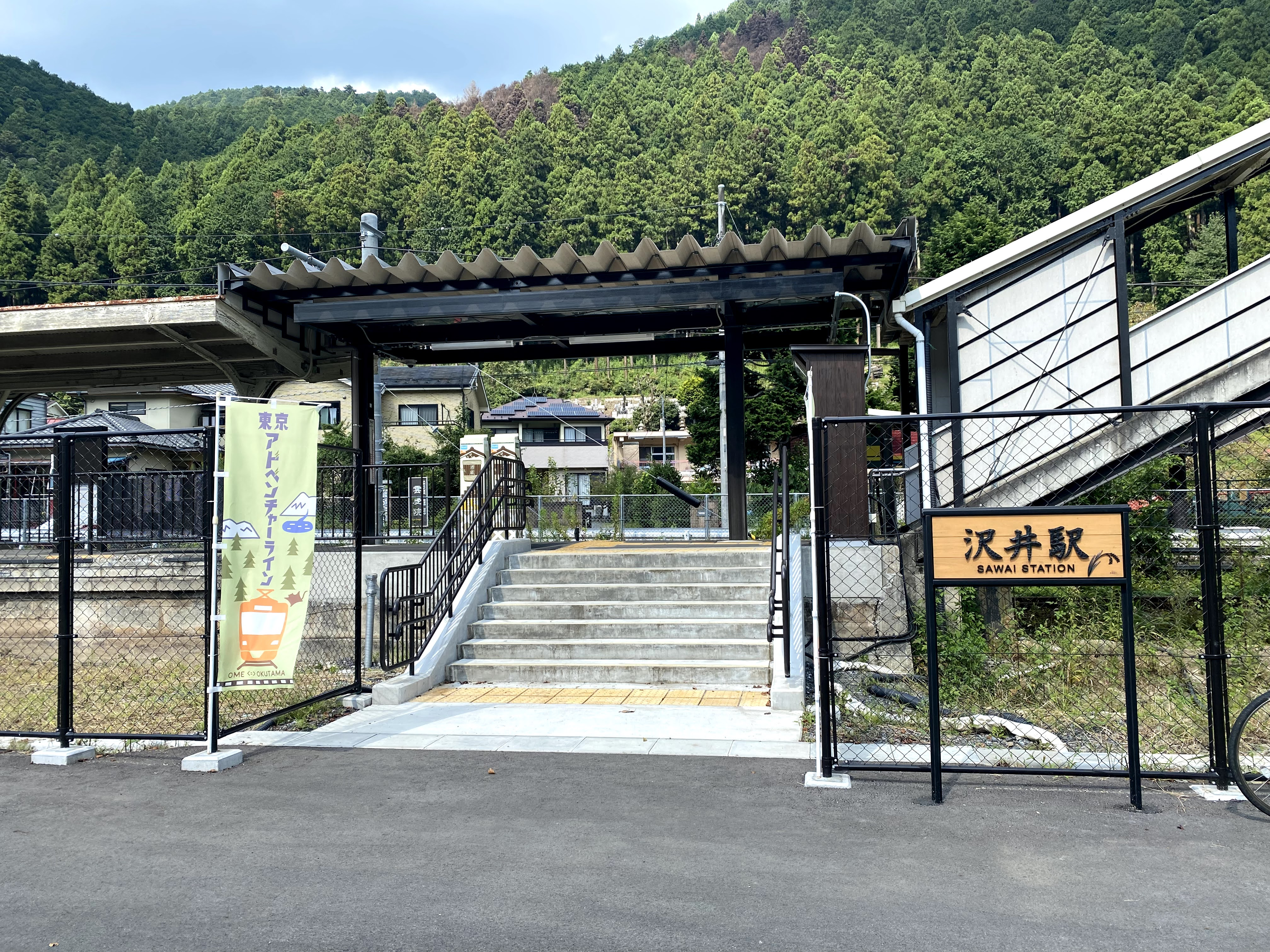
A station entrance, September 2021

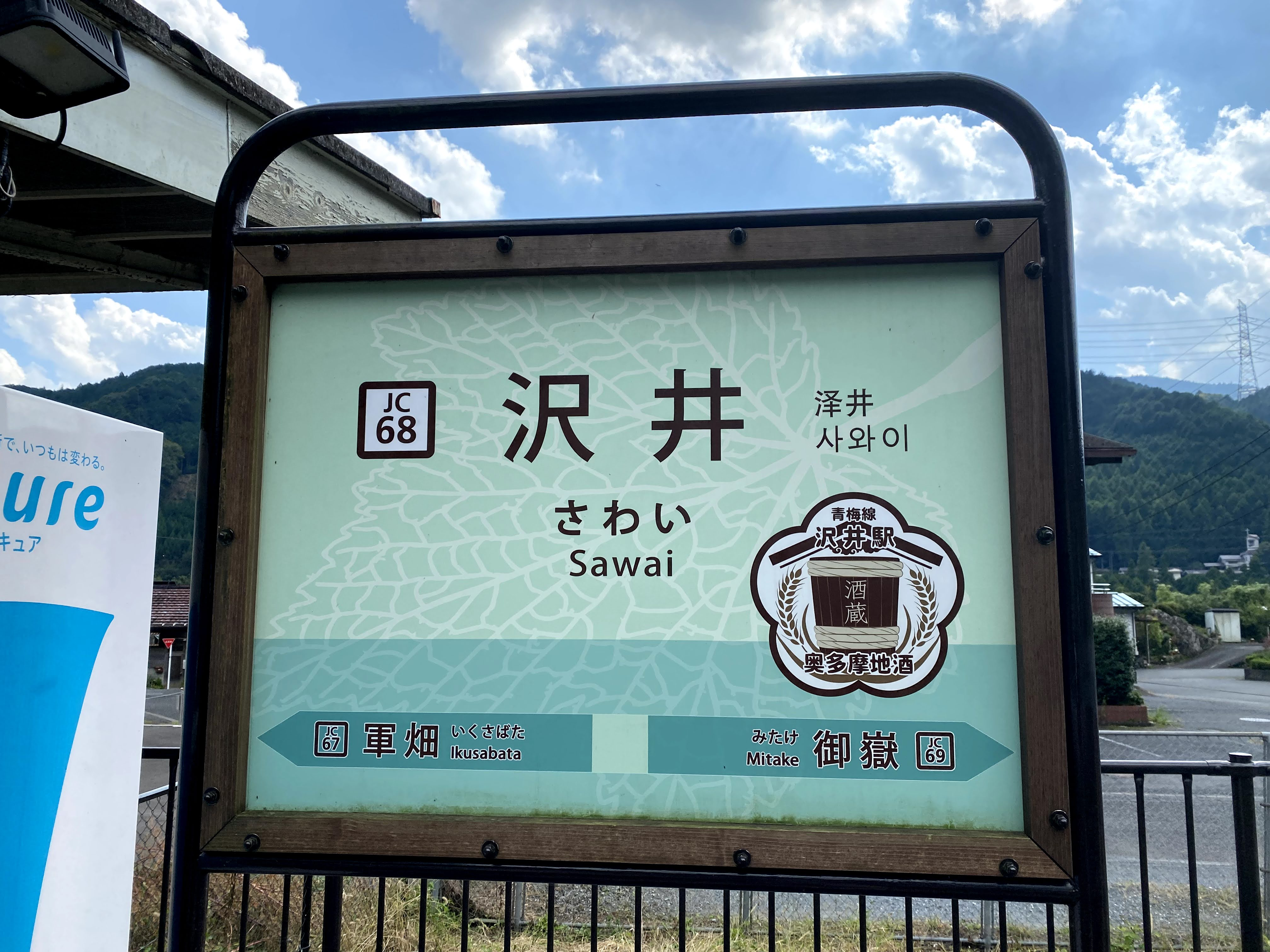
Name sign

=== Platforms ===
(South Exit side)	Ōme Line	for Mitake and Okutama
(North Exit side)	Ōme Line	for Ōme, Tachikawa, Shinjuku, and Tokyo

== History ==
The station opened on 1 September 1929. It was nationalized in April 1944. It became part of the East Japan Railway Company (JR East) with the breakup of the Japanese National Railways on 1 April 1987.

== Passenger statistics ==
In fiscal 2010, the station was used by an average of 274 passengers daily (boarding passengers only).

== Surrounding area ==
- National Route 411
- Tama River

== See also ==
- List of railway stations in Japan
