= Hinatawada Station =

Railway station in Ōme, Tokyo, Japan

JC64 Hinatawada Station 向和田駅
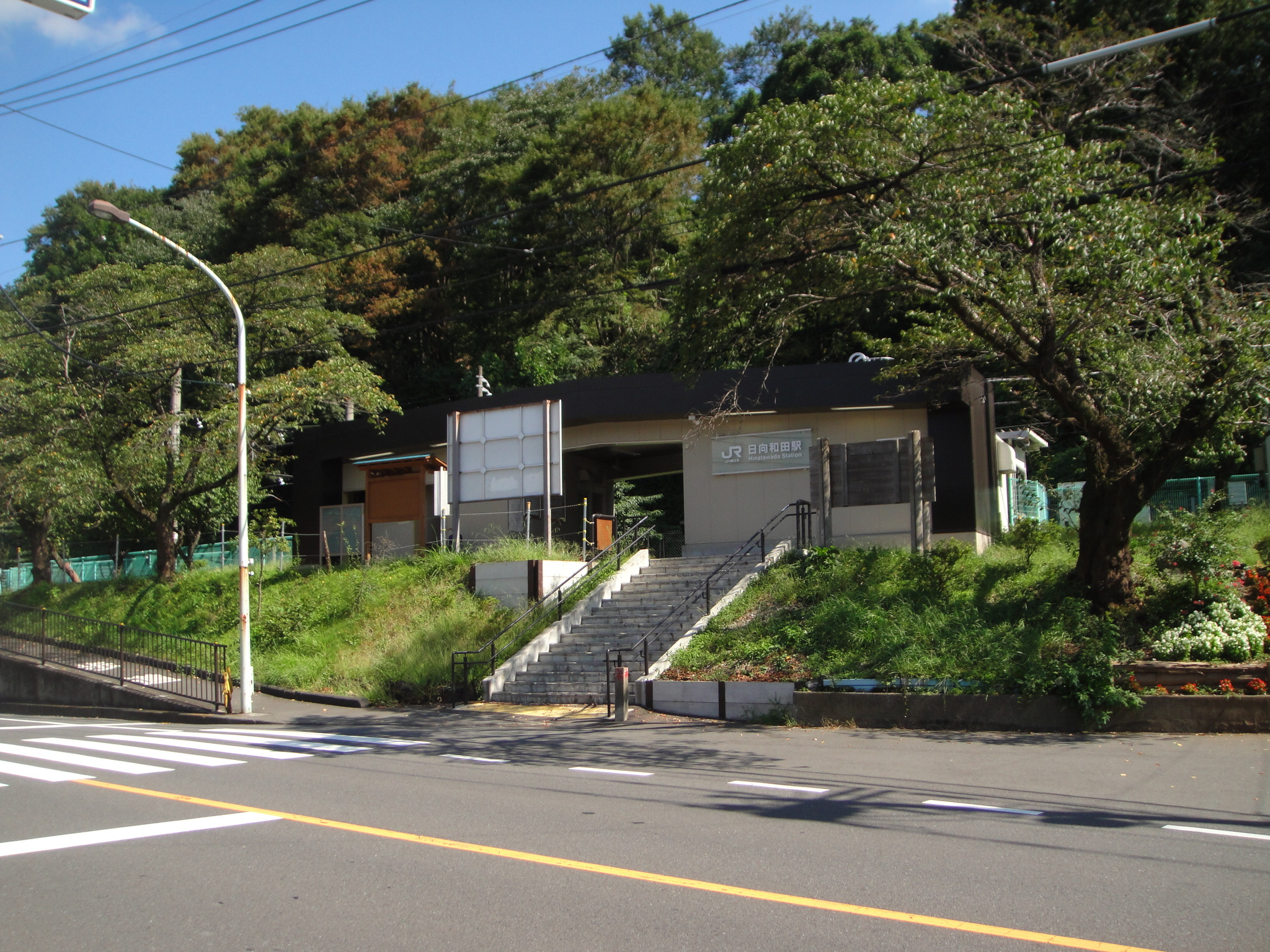
- Station building

General information
- Location: 3-Hinatawada, Ōme-shi, Tokyo-to 198-0046; Japan
- Coordinates: 35.7885°N 139.2294°E
- Operator: JR East
- Line: Ōme Line
- Distance: 21.4 km from Tachikawa
- Platforms: 1 side platform

Other information
- Status: Unstaffed
- Station code: JC64
- Website: Official website

History
- Opened: 28 December 1895

Passengers
- FY2014: 893

Services
Preceding station	JR East	Following station
Ishigamimae JC65 towards Oku-Tama	Ōme Line Rapid Local	Miyanohira JC63 towards Tachikawa
Location
- Location within Tokyo Location within Japan

Hinatawada Station (日向和田駅, Hinatawada-eki) is a passenger railway station located in the city of Ōme, Tokyo, Japan, operated by the East Japan Railway Company (JR East).

== Lines ==
Hinatawada Station is served by the Ōme Line, located 21.4 kilometers from the terminus of the line at Tachikawa Station.

== Station layout ==
This station consists of a single side platform serving a single bi-directional track. The station is unattended.

=== Platform ===
/	Ōme Line	for Mitake and Okutama for Ōme, Tachikawa, Shinjuku, and Tokyo

== History ==
Hinatawada Station opened on 28 December 1895. It was nationalized in 1944. It became part of the East Japan Railway Company (JR East) with the breakup of the Japanese National Railways in 1987.

== Passenger statistics ==
In fiscal 2014, the station was used by an average of 893 passengers daily (boarding passengers only).

== Surrounding area ==
- Japan National Route 411
- Tama River

== See also ==
- List of railway stations in Japan
