= Ōme Plum Park =

Park in Ōme, Tokyo, Japan

- 青梅市梅の公園
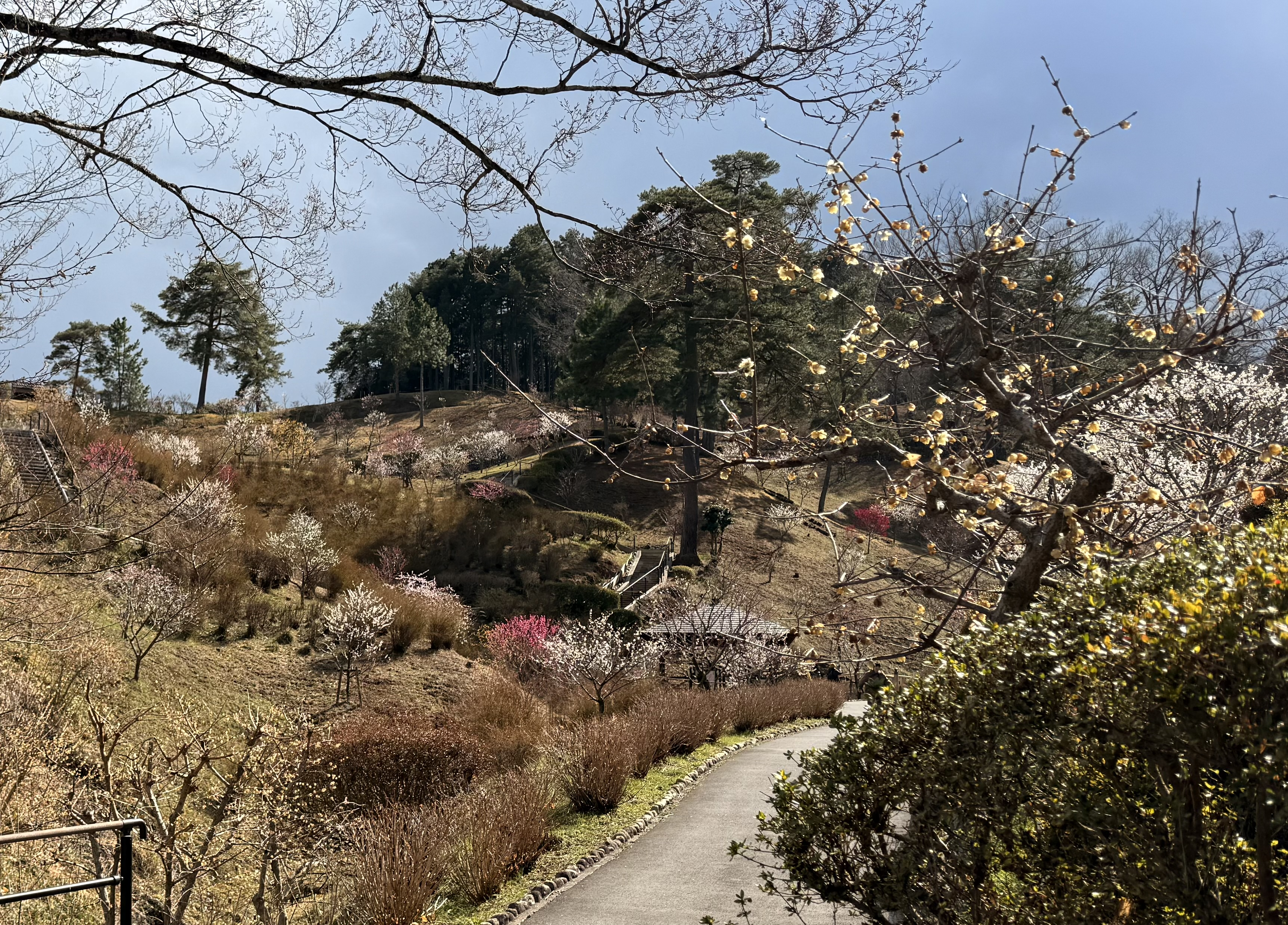
- Ōme Plum Park in early spring

- Location within Tokyo
- Type: Urban park
- Location: 4-527 Baigō, Ōme, Tokyo, Japan
- Coordinates: 35°47′7.34″N 139°13′10.23″E
- Area: 4 hectares (9.9 acres)
- Operator: Ōme City
- Status: Open year-round
- Public transit: Hinatawada Station (JR Ōme Line)

Ōme Plum Park (青梅市梅の公園, Ōme-shi Ume no Kōen) is a public park located in the Baigō district of Ōme, Tokyo, Japan. The park is renowned for its large collection of plum trees and is a popular destination for plum blossom viewing during early spring.

== History and significance ==
The Baigō area has long been associated with plum trees and recognized as such. In February 2009, Ōme Plum Park was voted first among approximately 90 plum-viewing spots across Japan in a Nikkei newspaper reader poll. However, in the early 2010s, a disease significantly damaged many of the original trees, forcing the city government to announce the removal of all the trees.

In 2016, a large-scale replanting effort was initiated. By 2019, around 1,200 new plum trees representing 144 varieties had been planted, helping to restore the park's reputation as one of Tokyo's premier hanami locations.

== Features ==
Ōme Plum Park is home to approximately 1,200 plum trees, including early-, mid-, and late-blooming varieties, which allow for a prolonged viewing season from February to March. The park's hillside location offers scenic views of the surrounding area, and seasonal flowers such as wintersweet, narcissus, and azaleas add to its appeal.

== Yoshino Baigō Ume Matsuri ==
Every year from late February to late March, the park serves as the main venue for the Yoshino Baigō Ume Matsuri (Plum Blossom Festival), a seasonal celebration featuring local music, dance performances, and food stalls.

== Access ==
Ōme Plum Park is located at 4-527 Baigō, Ōme City, Tokyo. It is approximately a 15-minute walk from Hinatawada Station on the Ōme Line.

== See also ==
- Hanami
- List of parks and gardens in Tokyo
