= Miyanohira Station =

Railway station in Ōme, Tokyo, Japan

JC63 Miyanohira Station 宮ノ平駅
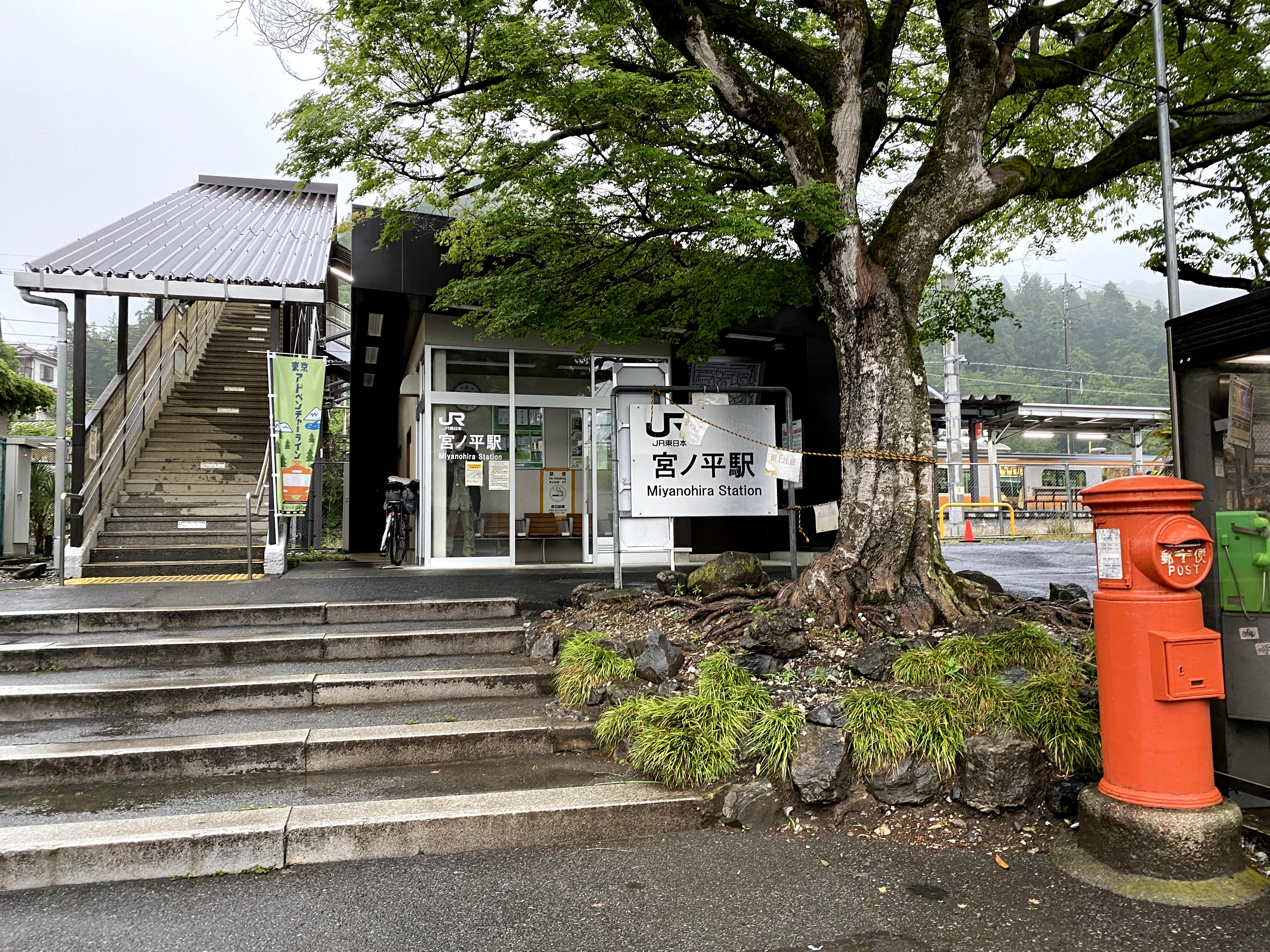
- Miyanohira Station, May 2021

General information
- Location: 2-Hinatawada, Ōme-shi, Tokyo-to 198-0046; Japan
- Coordinates: 35.7877°N 139.2373°E
- Operator: JR East
- Line: Ōme Line
- Distance: 20.6 km from Tachikawa
- Platforms: 1 island platform

Other information
- Status: Unstaffed
- Station code: JC63
- Website: Official website

History
- Opened: 1 April 1914

Passengers
- FY2010: 504

Services
Preceding station	JR East	Following station
Hinatawada JC64 towards Oku-Tama	Ōme Line Rapid Local	Ōme JC62 towards Tachikawa
Location
- Location within Tokyo Location within Japan

Miyanohira Station (宮ノ平駅, Miyanohira-eki) is a passenger railway station located in the city of Ōme, Tokyo, Japan, operated by the East Japan Railway Company (JR East).

== Lines ==
Miyanohira Station is served by the Ōme Line, located 20.6 kilometers from the terminus of the line at Tachikawa Station.

== Station layout ==
The station has one island platform serving two tracks. The station is unattended.

=== Platforms ===
1	Ōme Line	for Mitake and Okutama
2	Ōme Line	for Ōme, Tachikawa, Shinjuku, and Tokyo

== History ==
The station opened on 1 April 1914. It was nationalized in 1944. It became part of the East Japan Railway Company (JR East) with the breakup of the Japanese National Railways in 1987. A new station building was completed in 2009.

== Passenger statistics ==
In fiscal 2010, the station was used by an average of 504 passengers daily (boarding passengers only).

== Surrounding area ==
- Tama River

== See also ==
- List of railway stations in Japan
