= Higashi-Ōme Station =

Railway station in Ōme, Tokyo, Japan

JC61 Higashi-Ōme Station 東青梅駅
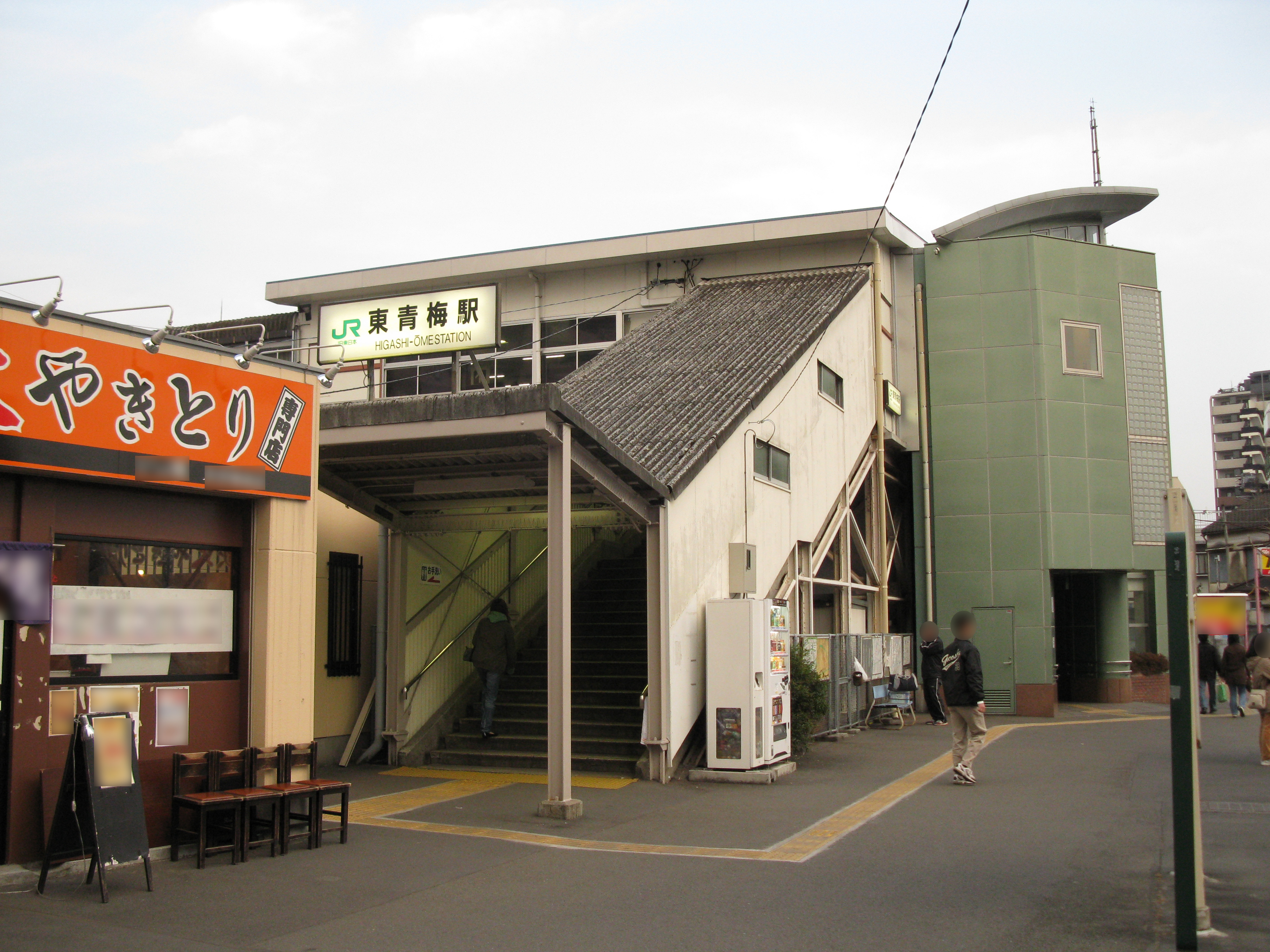
- Southern entrance of Higashi-Ōme Station, February 2009

General information
- Location: 1-9-1 Higashi-Ōme, Ōme-shi, Tokyo-to 198-0042; Japan
- Coordinates: 35.7899°N 139.2731°E
- Operator: JR East
- Line: Ōme Line
- Distance: 17.2 km from Tachikawa
- Platforms: 1 side platform
- Tracks: 1

Other information
- Status: Staffed
- Station code: JC61
- Website: Official website

History
- Opened: 1 October 1932

Passengers
- FY2019: 6,493

Services
Preceding station	JR East	Following station
Ōme One-way operation	Ōme Line Commuter Special Rapid	Kabe JC60 towards Tachikawa
Ōme JC62 Terminus	Ōme Line Ōme Special Rapid	Kabe JC60 towards Tachikawa
Ōme JC62 Terminus	Ōme Line Commuter Rapid	Kabe One-way operation
Ōme JC62 towards Oku-Tama	Ōme Line Rapid Local	Kabe JC60 towards Tachikawa
Location
- Location within Tokyo Location within Japan

Higashi-Ōme Station (東青梅駅, Higashi-Ōme-eki) is a passenger railway station located in the city of Ōme, Tokyo, Japan, operated by the East Japan Railway Company (JR East).

== Lines ==
Higashi-Ōme Station is served by the Ōme Line, located 17.2 kilometers from the terminus of the line at Tachikawa Station.

== Station layout ==
The station has one side platform serving a single bidirectional track, with an elevated station building. The station is staffed.

Before 14 May 2023, the station previously had 1 island platform serving two tracks. In preparation for Green Car's entry into service, the station was converted to single track as a result of platform extension, with track 1 got removed and track 2 became a bidirectional track which no longer having the track number. The platform was then extended to accommodate up to 12-car trains. This also caused the starting location for Ōme line's single-track section had been relocated to another nearby level crossing outside the station just before trains entering from double-tracked section.

== History ==
The station opened on 1 October 1932. It was nationalized in 1944. It became part of the East Japan Railway Company (JR East) with the breakup of the Japanese National Railways in 1987.

== Passenger statistics ==
In fiscal 2019, the station was used by an average of 6,493 passengers daily (boarding passengers only).

== Surrounding area ==
- Tama River
- former Ōme Kaidō highway

== See also ==
- List of railway stations in Japan
