= Kabe Station (Tokyo) =

Railway station in Ōme, Tokyo, Japan

JC60 Kabe Station 河辺駅
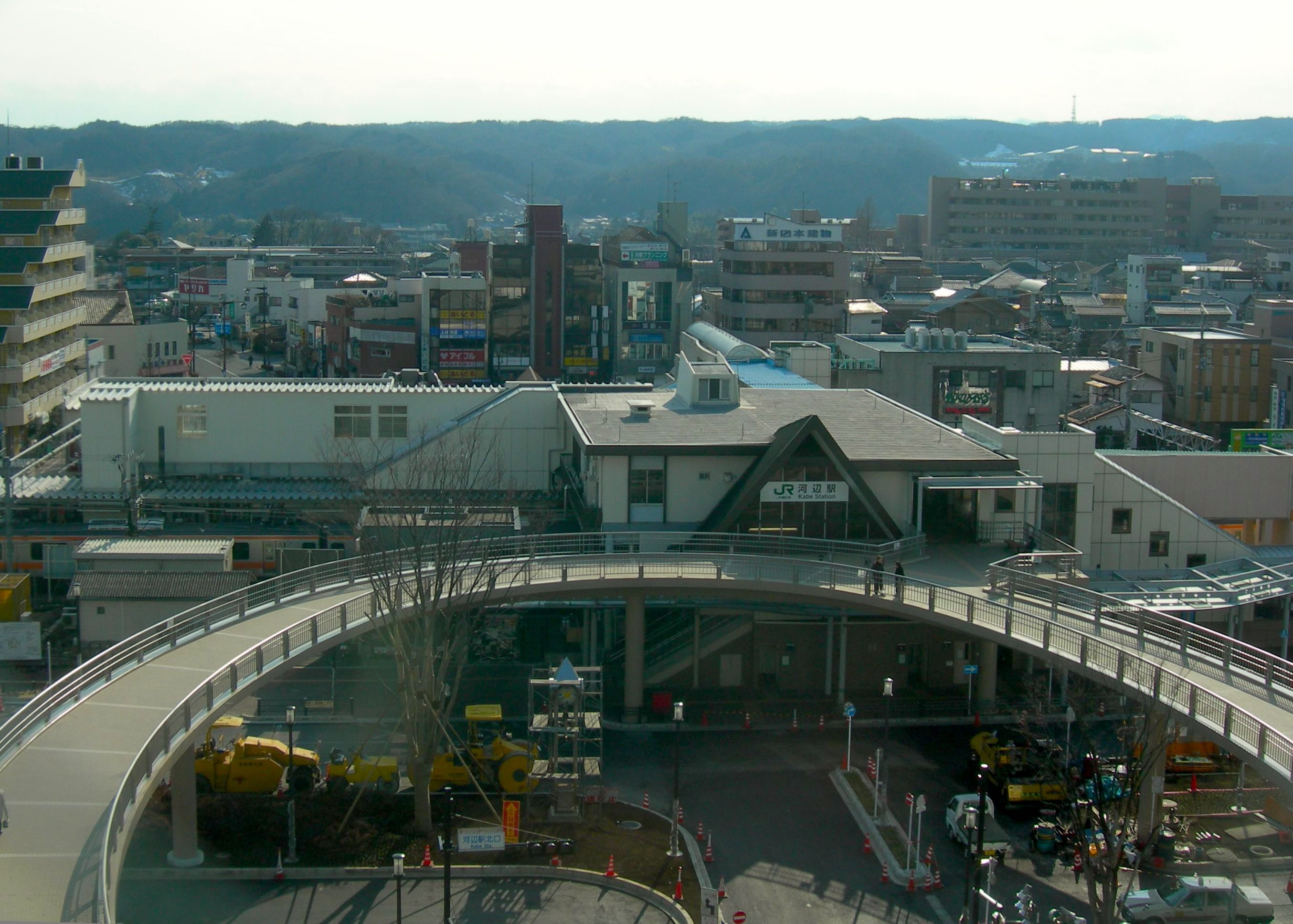
- Northern view of Kabe Station, February 2008

General information
- Location: 5-29-29 Kabe-machi, Ōme-shi, Tokyo-to 198-0036; Japan
- Coordinates: 35°47′05″N 139°17′03″E
- Operator: JR East
- Line: Ōme Line
- Distance: 15.9 km from Tachikawa
- Platforms: 1 island platform

Other information
- Status: Staffed
- Station code: JC60
- Website: Official website

History
- Opened: 20 February 1927

Passengers
- FY2019: 13,417 daily

Services
| Preceding station | JR East | Following station |
|---|---|---|
| Higashi-Ōme One-way operation | Ōme Line Commuter Special Rapid | Ozaku JC59 towards Tachikawa |
| Higashi-Ōme JC61 towards Ōme | Ōme Line Ōme Special Rapid | Ozaku JC59 towards Tachikawa |
| Higashi-Ōme JC61 towards Ōme | Ōme Line Commuter Rapid | Ozaku One-way operation |
| Higashi-Ōme JC61 towards Oku-Tama | Ōme Line Rapid Local | Ozaku JC59 towards Tachikawa |
Location
- Location within Tokyo Location within Japan

Kabe Station (河辺駅, Kabe-eki) is a passenger railway station located in the city of Ōme, Tokyo, Japan, operated by the East Japan Railway Company (JR East).

== Lines ==
Kabe Station is served by the Ōme Line, located 15.9 kilometers from the terminus of the line at Tachikawa Station.

== Station layout ==
The station has one island platform serving two tracks, with an elevated station building located above the platform, and a side platform for select trains. The station is staffed.

=== Platforms ===
| 1 | Ōme Line | for Ōme and Okutama |
| 2 | Ōme Line | for Tachikawa, Shinjuku, and Tokyo |

| 3 | Ōme Line |

== History ==
The station opened on 20 February 1927. It was nationalized in 1944. It became part of the East Japan Railway Company (JR East) with the breakup of the Japanese National Railways in 1987.

As a result of platform extension work on the Chūō and Ōme Lines, the Ōme Line has experienced various closures along its route to lengthen the platforms of its stations. During these periods, Kabe Station has served as a terminus for services bound for Tokyo. 15 October 2022 and 13 May 2023 are two instances of this occurring.

== Passenger statistics ==
In fiscal 2019, the station was used by an average of 13,417 passengers daily (boarding passengers only).

== Surrounding area ==
- Meisei University
- Shiofune Kannon

== See also ==
- List of railway stations in Japan
