= Kabe Station =

Kabe Station is the name of two train stations in Japan:

- Kabe Station (Hiroshima) (可部駅)
- Kabe Station (Tokyo) (河辺駅)
