= Ōme =

Ōme 青梅市
- City
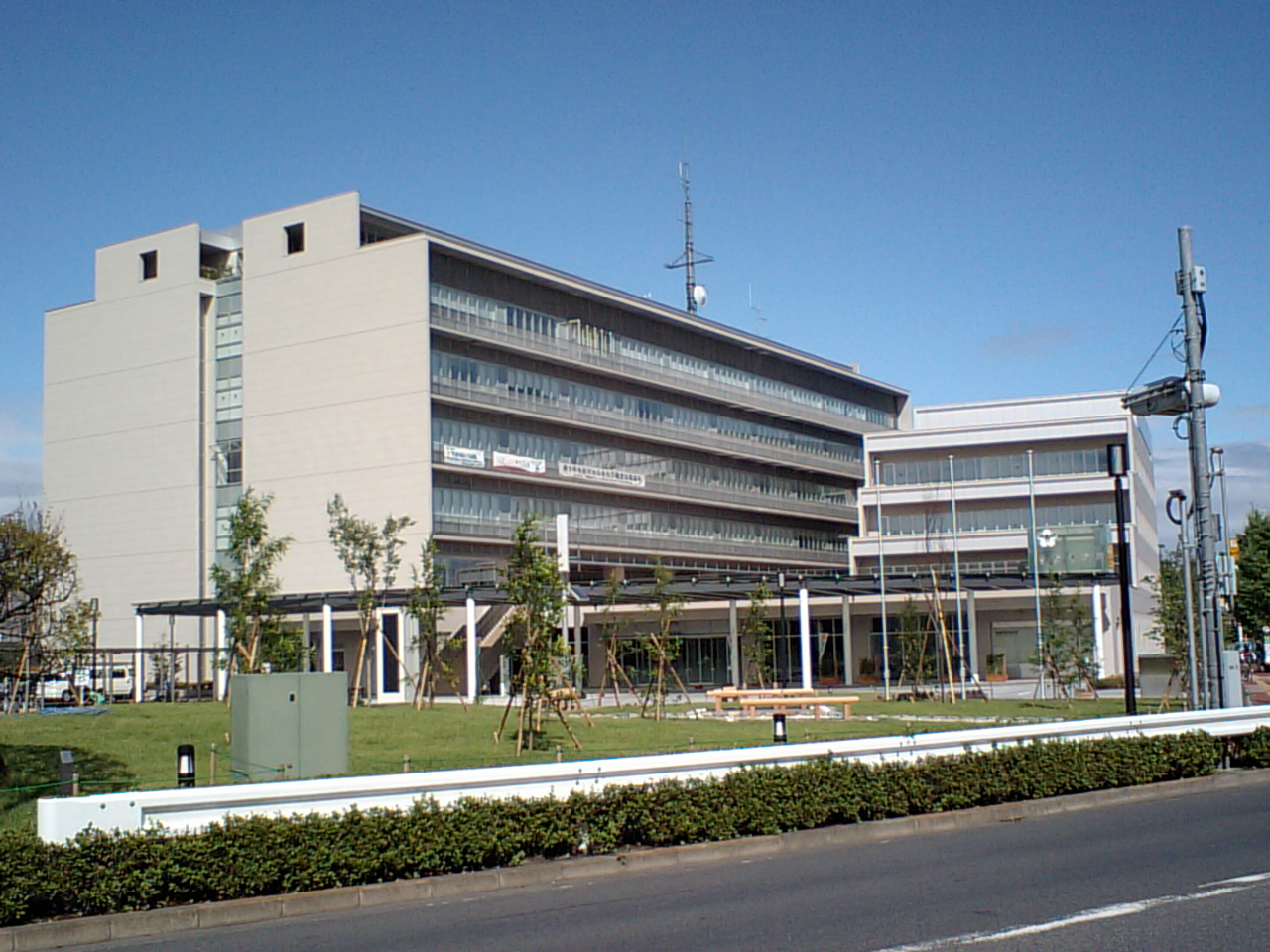
- Ōme City Hall

- Flag Seal

- Location of Ōme in Tokyo

- Coordinates: 35°47′16.7″N 139°16′33″E
- Country: Japan
- Region: Kantō
- Prefecture: Tokyo
- First official recorded: 91 BC (official)
- Town settled: April 1, 1889
- City settled: April 1, 1951

Government
  - Mayor: Toshiaki Ōsemachi (from November 2023)

Area
  - Total: 103.31 km^{2} (39.89 sq mi)

Population (March 2021)
  - Total: 131,895
  - Density: 1,276.7/km^{2} (3,306.6/sq mi)
- Time zone: UTC+9 (Japan Standard Time)
- Phone number: 0428-22-111
- Address: 1-11-1 Higashi-ome, Ome-shi, Tokyo 198-8701
- Climate: Cfa
- Website: Official website
- Symbols
- Bird: Cettia diphone
- Flower: Prunus mume
- Tree: Cryptomeria japonica

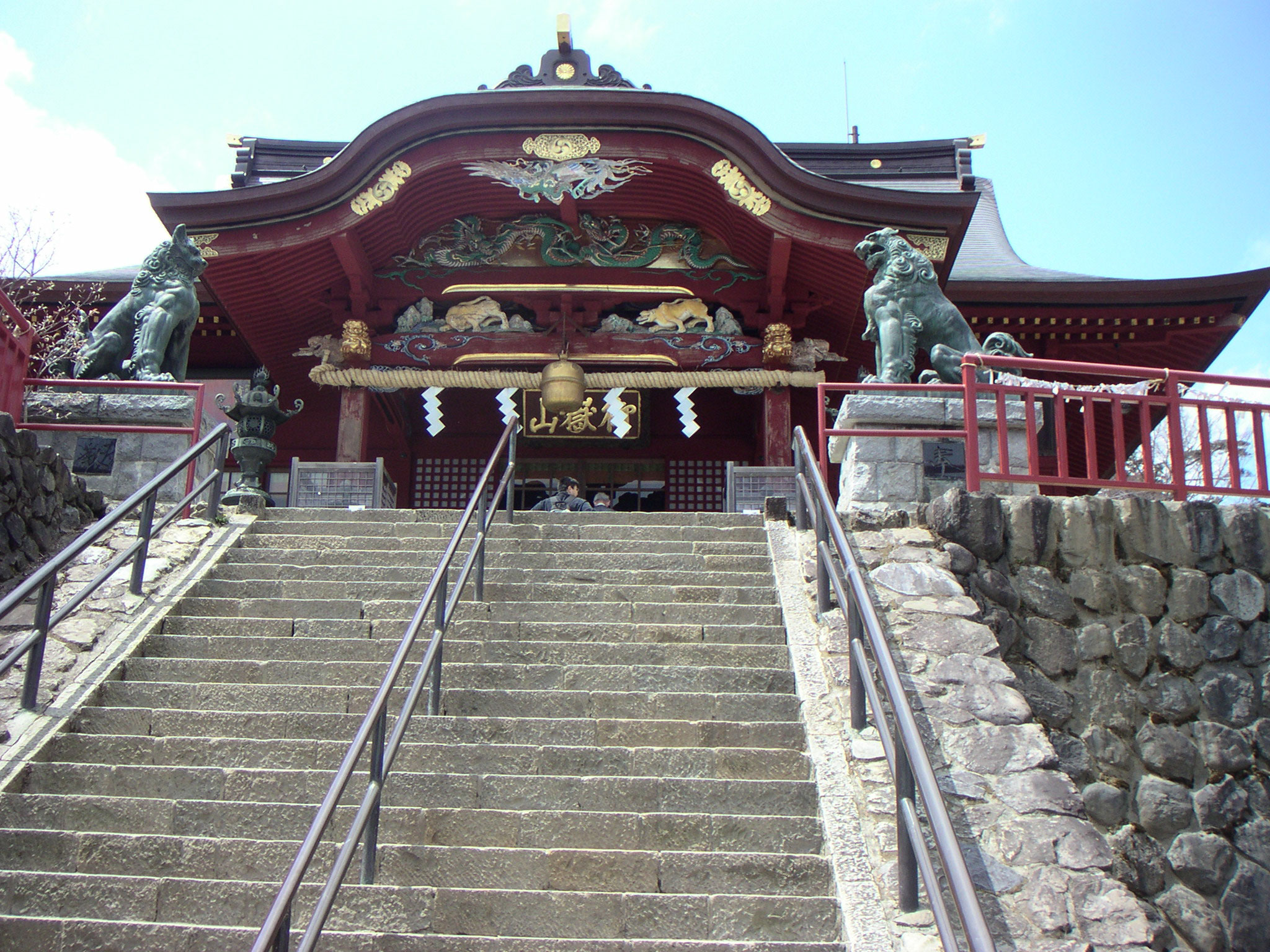
Mitake shrine

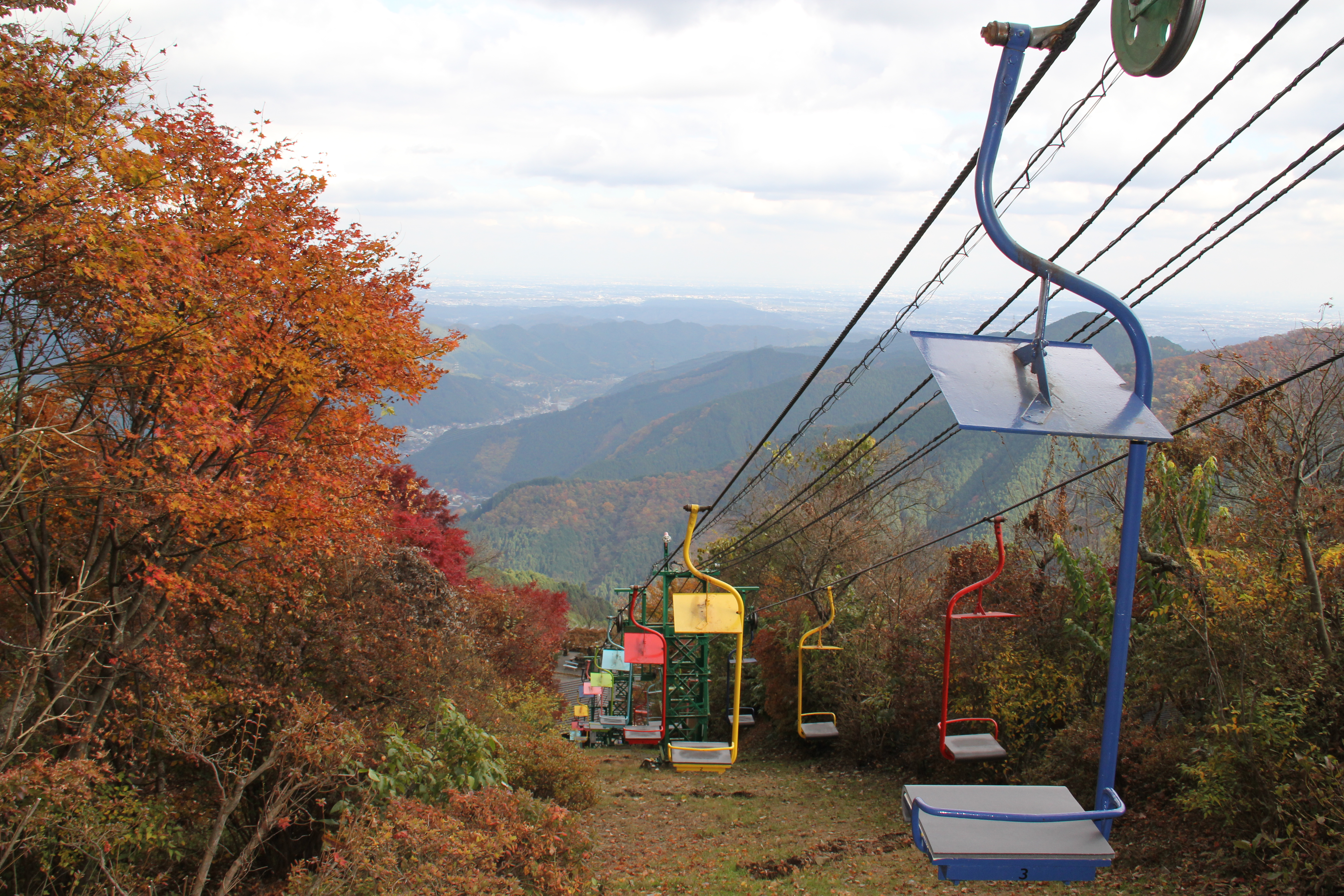
Mitakesan chairlift

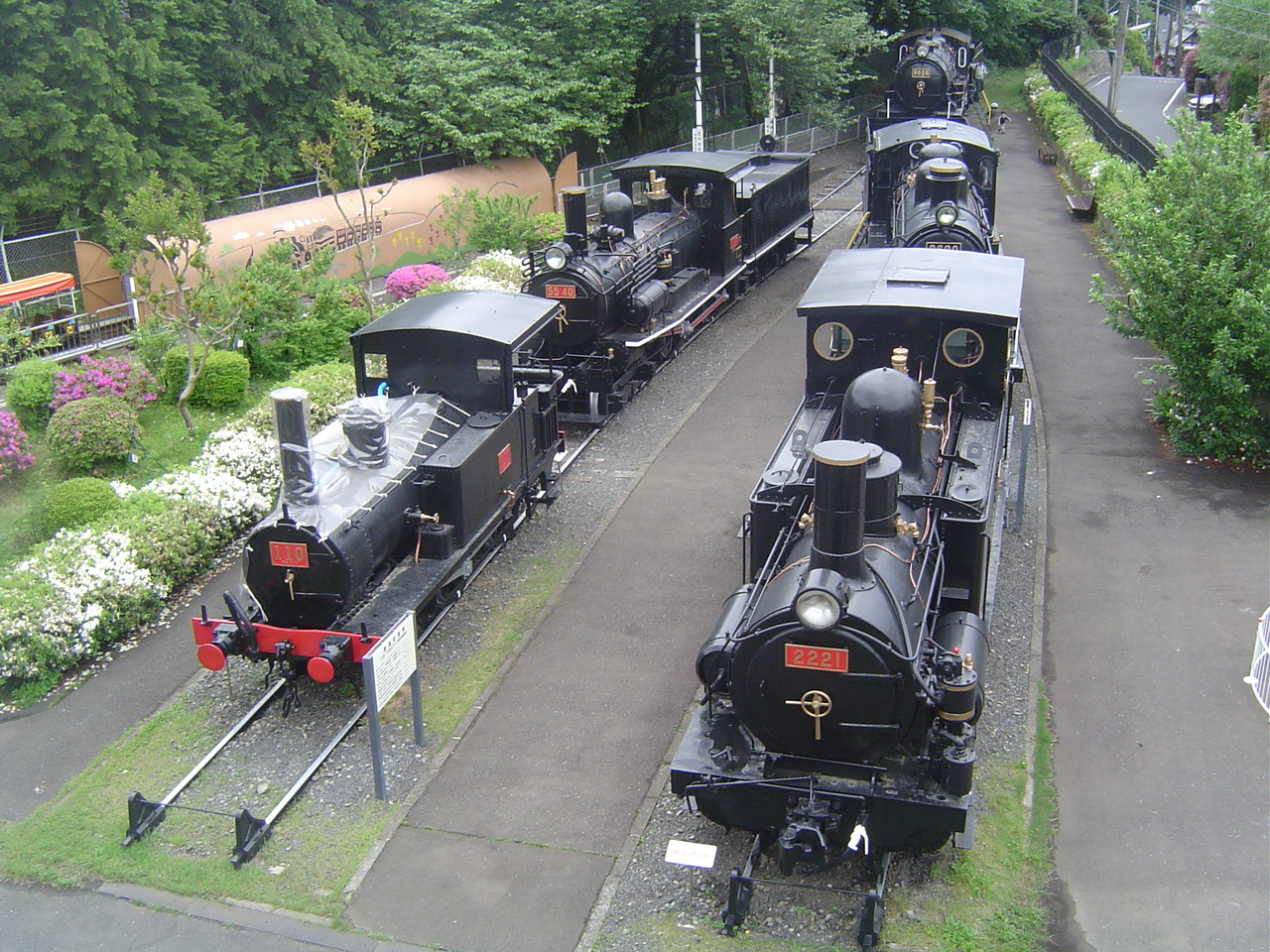
OmeRailwayPark

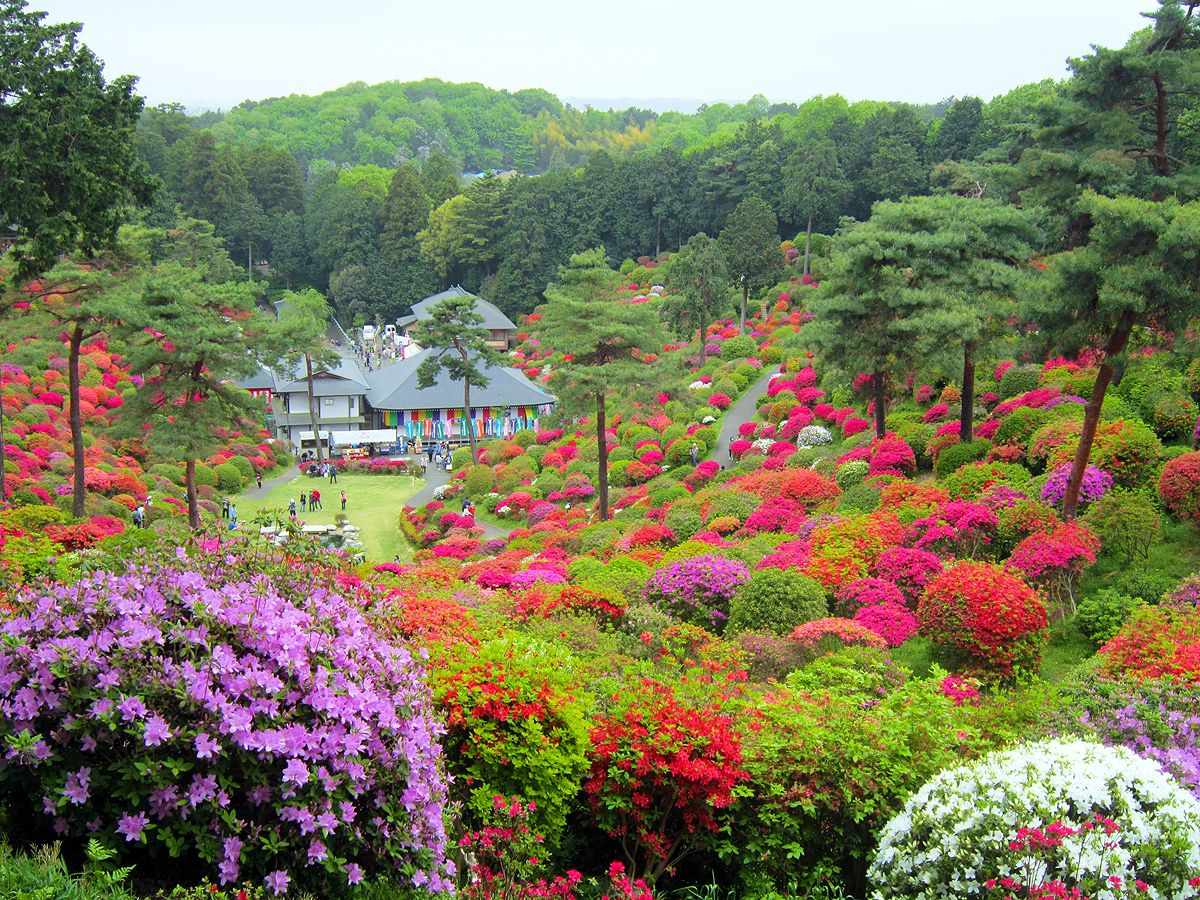
Shiofune Kannon-ji

Ōme (青梅市, Ōme-shi; Japanese pronunciation: [ó̞ò̞.mè̞, ò̞ó̞.mé̞.ɕì, ó̞ó̞.mé̞-]) is a city located in the western portion of the Tokyo Metropolis, Japan. As of 1 May 2023, the city had an estimated population of 131,128, and a population density of 1300 persons per km^{2}. The total area of the city is 103.31 square kilometres (39.89 sq mi).

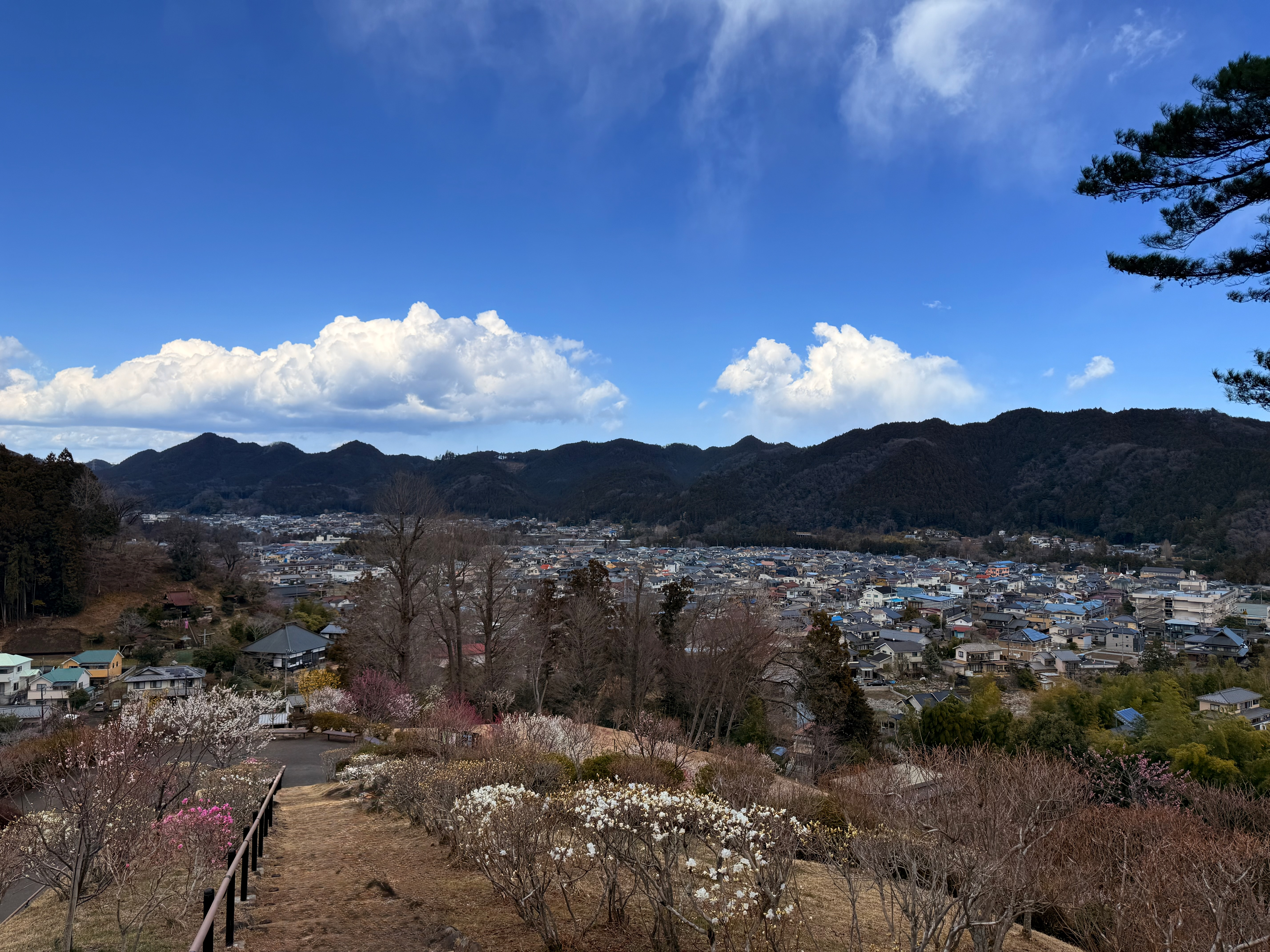
View of Ome from Plum Park.

== Geography ==
Ōme is located in the Okutama Mountains of western Tokyo, bordered by Saitama Prefecture to the north. The Tama River runs from west to east almost in the center of the city area, and the Kasumi River and Naruki River, which are tributaries of the Iruma River (Arakawa River system), also flow from west to east in the north. The geography changes from the flat land in the east to the hills and mountains in the west. The highest point is 1,084 meters on Mount Nabewariyama on the right bank of the Tama River in the western end of the city.

=== Surrounding municipalities ===
Saitama Prefecture

- Hanno to the north
- Iruma to the east

Tokyo Metropolis

- Akiruno to the south
- Hamura to the southeast
- Hinode to the south
- Okutama to the west

=== Climate ===
Ōme has a humid subtropical climate (Köppen Cfa) characterized by warm summers and cool winters with light to no snowfall. The average annual temperature in Ōme is 12.3 °C. The average annual rainfall is 1998 mm with September as the wettest month. The temperatures are highest on average in August, at around 23.8 °C, and lowest in January, at around 0.7 °C.

Climate data for Ōme (1991−2020 normals, extremes 1976−present)
Month	Jan	Feb	Mar	Apr	May	Jun	Jul	Aug	Sep	Oct	Nov	Dec	Year
Record high °C (°F)	18.7 (65.7)	24.0 (75.2)	27.6 (81.7)	32.7 (90.9)	34.7 (94.5)	37.0 (98.6)	40.8 (105.4)	39.6 (103.3)	36.8 (98.2)	33.2 (91.8)	26.4 (79.5)	26.2 (79.2)	40.8 (105.4)
Mean daily maximum °C (°F)	9.2 (48.6)	10.0 (50.0)	13.4 (56.1)	18.8 (65.8)	23.3 (73.9)	25.6 (78.1)	29.6 (85.3)	31.0 (87.8)	26.8 (80.2)	21.2 (70.2)	16.1 (61.0)	11.5 (52.7)	19.7 (67.5)
Daily mean °C (°F)	3.2 (37.8)	4.1 (39.4)	7.6 (45.7)	12.9 (55.2)	17.7 (63.9)	21.0 (69.8)	24.8 (76.6)	25.9 (78.6)	22.1 (71.8)	16.5 (61.7)	10.7 (51.3)	5.6 (42.1)	14.3 (57.7)
Mean daily minimum °C (°F)	−2.3 (27.9)	−1.3 (29.7)	2.2 (36.0)	7.2 (45.0)	12.5 (54.5)	17.0 (62.6)	21.1 (70.0)	22.0 (71.6)	18.3 (64.9)	12.4 (54.3)	5.9 (42.6)	0.3 (32.5)	9.6 (49.3)
Record low °C (°F)	−9.3 (15.3)	−9.2 (15.4)	−7.4 (18.7)	−2.5 (27.5)	3.5 (38.3)	8.9 (48.0)	12.5 (54.5)	15.0 (59.0)	8.0 (46.4)	1.4 (34.5)	−3.5 (25.7)	−6.8 (19.8)	−9.3 (15.3)
Average precipitation mm (inches)	49.8 (1.96)	45.2 (1.78)	90.1 (3.55)	108.4 (4.27)	124.4 (4.90)	176.0 (6.93)	197.9 (7.79)	212.9 (8.38)	234.2 (9.22)	208.6 (8.21)	71.3 (2.81)	44.6 (1.76)	1,563.3 (61.55)
Average precipitation days (≥ 1.0 mm)	4.3	4.8	8.8	9.0	10.0	12.8	12.9	11.5	12.3	10.6	7.0	4.6	108.6
Mean monthly sunshine hours	202.2	181.8	178.7	182.8	184.8	124.4	148.1	170.4	130.4	134.0	161.5	187.7	1,986.8
Source: JMA

== Demographics ==
Per Japanese census data, the population of Ōme saw strong growth throughout the late 20th century but has begun to decline in the early 21st. According to the Ministry of Health, Labor and Welfare's National Institute of Population and Social Security Research, Ōme's population is expected to fall to 104,000 by 2040, a decline of 25.3% from 139,000 in 2010.

Historical population
Year	Pop.	±%
1920	33,097	—
1930	37,422	+13.1%
1940	39,231	+4.8%
1950	53,166	+35.5%
1960	56,896	+7.0%
1970	70,954	+24.7%
1980	98,990	+39.5%
1990	125,960	+27.2%
2000	141,394	+12.3%
2010	139,339	−1.5%
2020	133,535	−4.2%

== History ==
The area of present-day Ōme was part of ancient Musashi Province. Ōme developed in the Edo period as a post station on the Ōme Kaidō highway. In the post-Meiji Restoration cadastral reform of July 22, 1878, the area became part of Nishitama District in Kanagawa Prefecture. The town of Ōme was created on April 1, 1889, with the establishment of modern municipalities system. Nishitama District was transferred to the administrative control of Tokyo Metropolis on April 1, 1893. Ōme was elevated to city status on April 1, 1951, by merging with the neighboring villages of Kasumi and Chōfu. Later in 1955, four additional villages (Yoshida, Mita, Kosoki, and Nariki) merged with Ōme.

== Government ==
Ōme has a mayor-council form of government with a directly elected mayor and a unicameral city council of 24 members. Ōme contributes one member to the Tokyo Metropolitan Assembly. In terms of national politics, the city is part of Tokyo 25th district of the lower house of the Diet of Japan.

== Education ==
- Meisei University - Ōme campus

The city has two public high schools operated by the Tokyo Metropolitan Board of Education.

- Ome Sogo High School
- Tama High School

Tokyo Metropolis also operates one special education school for handicapped students.

- Seiho Gakuen School

Ōme has 17 public elementary schools and 11 public junior high schools operated by the city government.

Municipal junior high schools:

- No. 1 (第一中学校)
- No. 2 (第二中学校)
- No. 3 (第三中学校)
- No. 6 (第六中学校)
- No. 7 (第七中学校)
- Fukiage (吹上中学校)
- Higashi (東中学校)
- Izumi (泉中学校)
- Kasumidai (霞台中学校)
- Nishi (西中学校)
- Shinmachi (新町中学校)

Municipal elementary schools:

- No. 1 (第一小学校)
- No. 2 (第二小学校)
- No. 3 (第三小学校)
- No. 4 (第四小学校)
- No. 5 (第五小学校)
- No. 6 (第六小学校)
- No. 7 (第七小学校)
- Fujihashi (藤橋小学校)
- Fukiage (吹上小学校)
- Higashi ("East") (東小学校)
- Imai (今井小学校)
- Kabe (河辺小学校)
- Kasumidai (霞台小学校)
- Nariki (成木小学校)
- Shinmachi (新町小学校)
- Tomoda (友田小学校)
- Wakakusa (若草小学校)

== Transportation ==
=== Railway ===
JR East – Ōme Line

- Kabe - Higashi-Ōme - Ōme - Miyanohira - Hinatawada - Ishigamimae - Futamatao - Ikusabata - Sawai - Mitake
- Mitake Tozan Railway

=== Highway ===
- Ken-Ō Expressway

== Sister cities ==
- Boppard, Germany
- Ome, Italy

== Local attractions ==
- Mitake Shrine
- Mount Mitake
- Ome Marathon
- Ome Railway Park
- Ome Kimono Museum
- Ōme Plum Park
- Ome Plum Park (Japanese Wikipedia)
