= Ōme Line =

Railway line in Tokyo, Japan

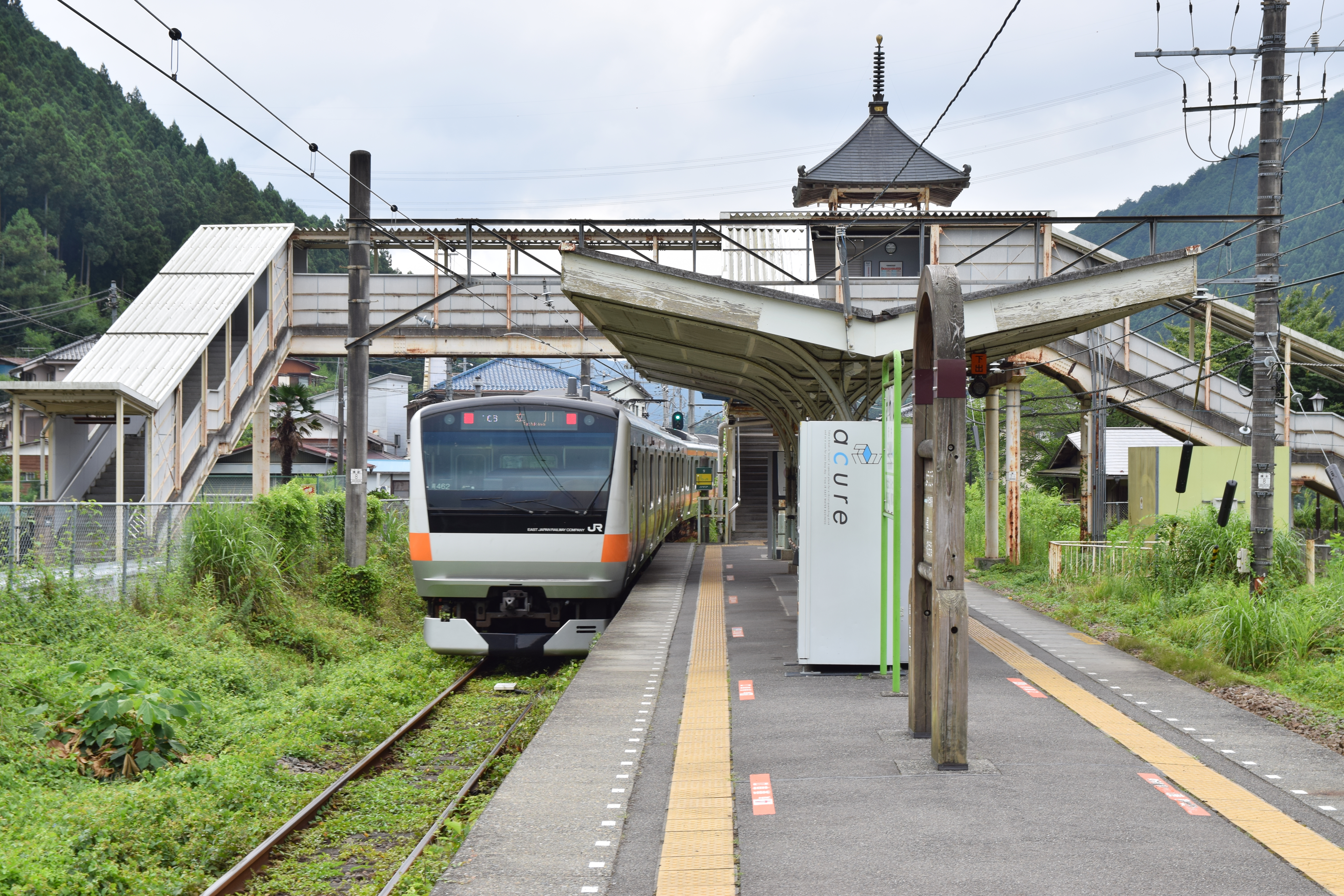
- An E233 series EMU at Sawai Station

Overview
- Other name: Tokyo Adventure Line (Ōme - Okutama)
- Native name: 青梅線
- Owner: JR East
- Locale: Tokyo
- Termini: Tachikawa; Oku-Tama
- Stations: 25

Service
- Type: Heavy rail
- Operator(s): JR East, JR Freight

History
- Opened: November 19, 1894; 131 years ago

Technical
- Line length: 37.2 km (23.1 mi)
- Track gauge: 1,067 mm (3 ft 6 in)
- Electrification: 1,500 V DC overhead catenary
Route map

The Ōme Line (青梅線, Ōme-sen) is a railway line operated by East Japan Railway Company (JR East) in western Tokyo, Japan. It links Tachikawa and the Chūō Line with the town of Okutama. Many Chūō Line trains operate via the Ōme Line to Ōme Station, providing a direct service to Tokyo Station.

The section between Ōme and Oku-Tama is now nicknamed as the "Tokyo Adventure Line (東京アドベンチャーライン)".

== Services ==
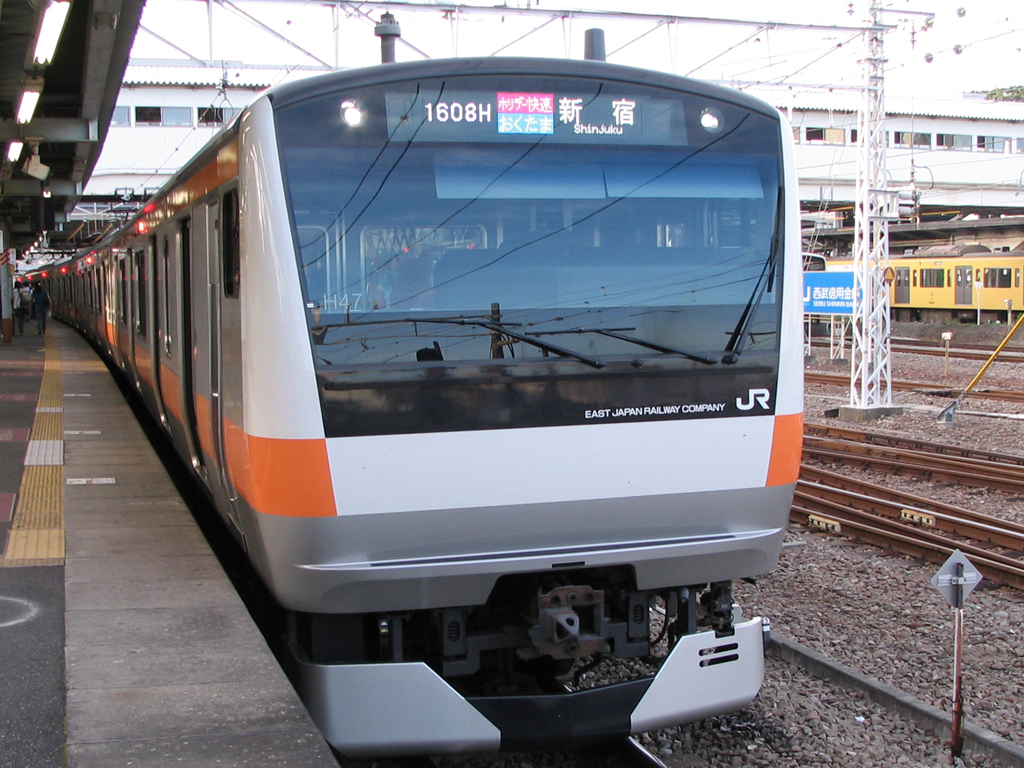
A Shinjuku-bound Holiday Rapid Okutama (E233 series EMU) at Haijima Station

=== Ōme Line Local ===
Local trains stop at all stations. However, they rarely run along the entire Ōme Line, with services splitting at Ōme Station.

=== Through services ===
The Ōme Line, at times, runs through services along the Chūō Rapid, Itsukaichi. Supplemental trains during the peak season may also run along the Nambu Line. Trains that operate only on the Ōme Line have "Ōme-Itsukaichi Line" displayed at the front.

- Chūō - Ōme Line through service: Some Chūō Line trains operate through service to the Ōme Line via Tachikawa. Most through services only go as far as Ōme, and stop at all stations on the Ōme Line, except the Holiday Rapid Okutama (See below). There are two other through service variations which uses the Ōme Line as an intermediate line, which are shown below.
- Ōme - Itsukaichi Line through service: Some Itsukaichi Line operate through service to the Ōme Line via Haijima. They operate between Musashi-Itsukaichi and Tachikawa. Note that these trains do not go on the Chūō Line.

=== Holiday Rapid Okutama ===
Holiday Rapid Okutama services run on weekends from Shinjuku Sta. and to Tokyo. It is necessary to change trains at Ōme Station.

=== Abolished ===
==== Ōme Limited Express ====
Before 15 March 2025, the Ōme Limited Express (特急おうめ) was a limited express train service for commuters on the Chūō Rapid Line and Ōme Line. The train operated on weekdays only. Prior to 16 March 2019, this train operated as the Ōme Liner (青梅ライナー).

==== Through services ====
  - Chūō - Ōme - Hachiko Line through service: As mentioned above, there were through services from Tokyo on the Chūō Line to the Hachiko Line, via the Ōme Line. These trains had been run from/to Hakonegasaki or Komagawa since March 1996 until March 2022. But, this though-service was discontinued on March 2022. Because Hachiko Line has began One-person operation since 2022.
  - Chūō - Ōme - Itsukaichi Line through service: At rush hours, few Chūō Line trains run through services between Tokyo and the Itsukaichi Line via Haijima. These services are always joined with another through service train, which couples / decouples at Haijima. During morning rush, some trains from Musashi-Itsukaichi on the Itsukaichi Line, and another train from Ōme on the Ōme Line, or from Hakonegasaki / Komagawa on the Hachiko Line, couple at Haijima, and head for Tokyo. During evening rush, the reverse occurs.

== Station list ==
- All stations are located in Tokyo.
- Local, rapid, and special rapid trains stop at all stations.
- On the track column, stations where trains can pass one another are marked "◇", "∨", and "∧", and those where trains cannot pass each other at stations marked "｜". Stations marked "∥" are double-tracked.

No.	Station	Japanese	Distance (km)		Holiday Rapid	Transfers	Track	Location
No.	Station	Japanese	Between stations	Total	Okutama	Transfers	Track	Location
JC19	Tachikawa	立川	-	0.0	●	Chūō Line; Nambu Line; Tama Toshi Monorail Line (Tachikawa-Kita, Tachikawa-Minami)	∥	Tachikawa
JC51	Nishi-Tachikawa	西立川	1.9	1.9	●		∥	Tachikawa
JC52	Higashi-Nakagami	東中神	0.8	2.7	｜		∥	Akishima
JC53	Nakagami	中神	0.9	3.6	｜		∥	Akishima
JC54	Akishima	昭島	1.4	5.0	｜		∥	Akishima
JC55	Haijima	拝島	1.9	6.9	● (Connect with relay trains to Musashi Itsukaichi Sta.)	Itsukaichi Line; ■ Hachikō Line; Haijima Line	∥	Akishima
JC56	Ushihama	牛浜	1.7	8.6	｜		∥	Fussa
JC57	Fussa	福生	1.0	9.6	●		∥	Fussa
JC58	Hamura	羽村	2.1	11.7	｜		∥	Hamura
JC59	Ozaku	小作	2.4	14.1	｜		∥	Hamura
JC60	Kabe	河辺	1.8	15.9	｜		∨	Ōme
JC61	Higashi-Ōme	東青梅	1.3	17.2	｜		｜	Ōme
JC62	Ōme	青梅	1.3	18.5	● (Connect with relay trains to Okutama)		◇	Ōme
JC63	Miyanohira	宮ノ平	2.1	20.6	｜		◇	Ōme
JC64	Hinatawada	日向和田	0.8	21.4	｜		｜	Ōme
JC65	Ishigamimae	石神前	1.0	22.4	｜		｜	Ōme
JC66	Futamatao	二俣尾	1.2	23.6	｜		◇	Ōme
JC67	Ikusabata	軍畑	0.9	24.5	｜		｜	Ōme
JC68	Sawai	沢井	1.4	25.9	｜		◇	Ōme
JC69	Mitake	御嶽	1.3	27.2	● (Relay trains)	Mitake Tozan Railway: Cable car (Takimoto via bus)	◇	Ōme
JC70	Kawai	川井	2.8	30.0	｜		｜	Okutama, Nishitama District
JC71	Kori	古里	1.6	31.6	｜		◇	Okutama, Nishitama District
JC72	Hatonosu	鳩ノ巣	2.2	33.8	｜		◇	Okutama, Nishitama District
JC73	Shiromaru	白丸	1.4	35.2	｜		｜	Okutama, Nishitama District
JC74	Oku-Tama	奥多摩	2.0	37.2	● (Relay trains)		∧	Okutama, Nishitama District

== Rolling stock ==
- E233-0 series

Services on the Ōme Line between Ōme Sta. and Tachikawa Sta. are usually formed of E233-0 series 10-car / 6+4 car EMUs. In other, this line between Ōme Sta. and Okutama Sta. are always formed E233-0 series 4 car which are corresponded to One-person operation. One-person operation trains named P-formation. In past, while 209-1000 series trains usually only ran on the Chuo Line (Rapid) between Tokyo and Takao stations, on rare occasions (such as a shortage of train sets due to an accident) they may also run on the Ome Line as far as Ome station. Due to the lack of passenger-operated door controls on these sets all doors open at each station on these sets.

== History ==
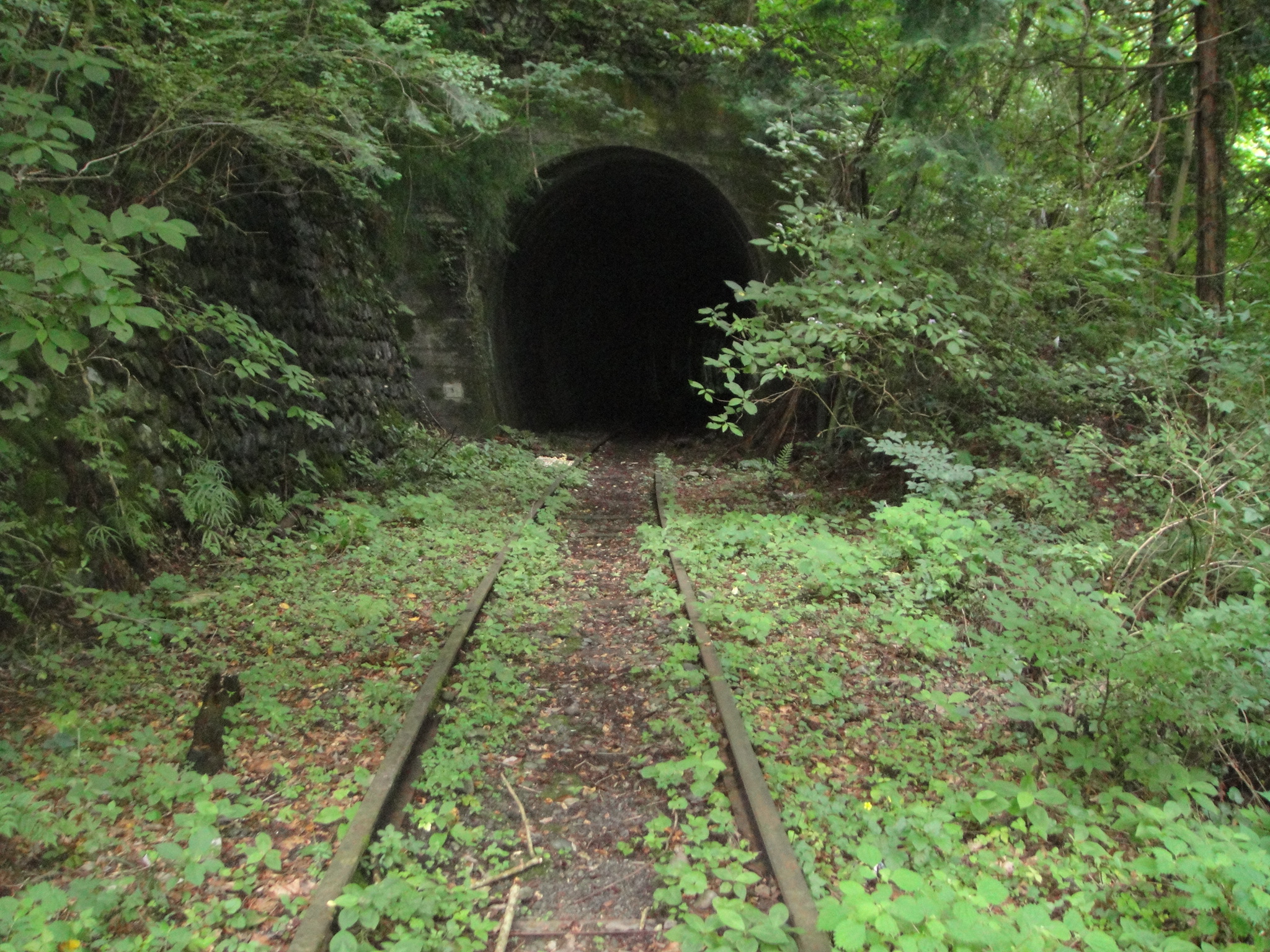
No. 1 Hikawa tunnel on the Ogouchi dam line (now Mizune Freight Line)

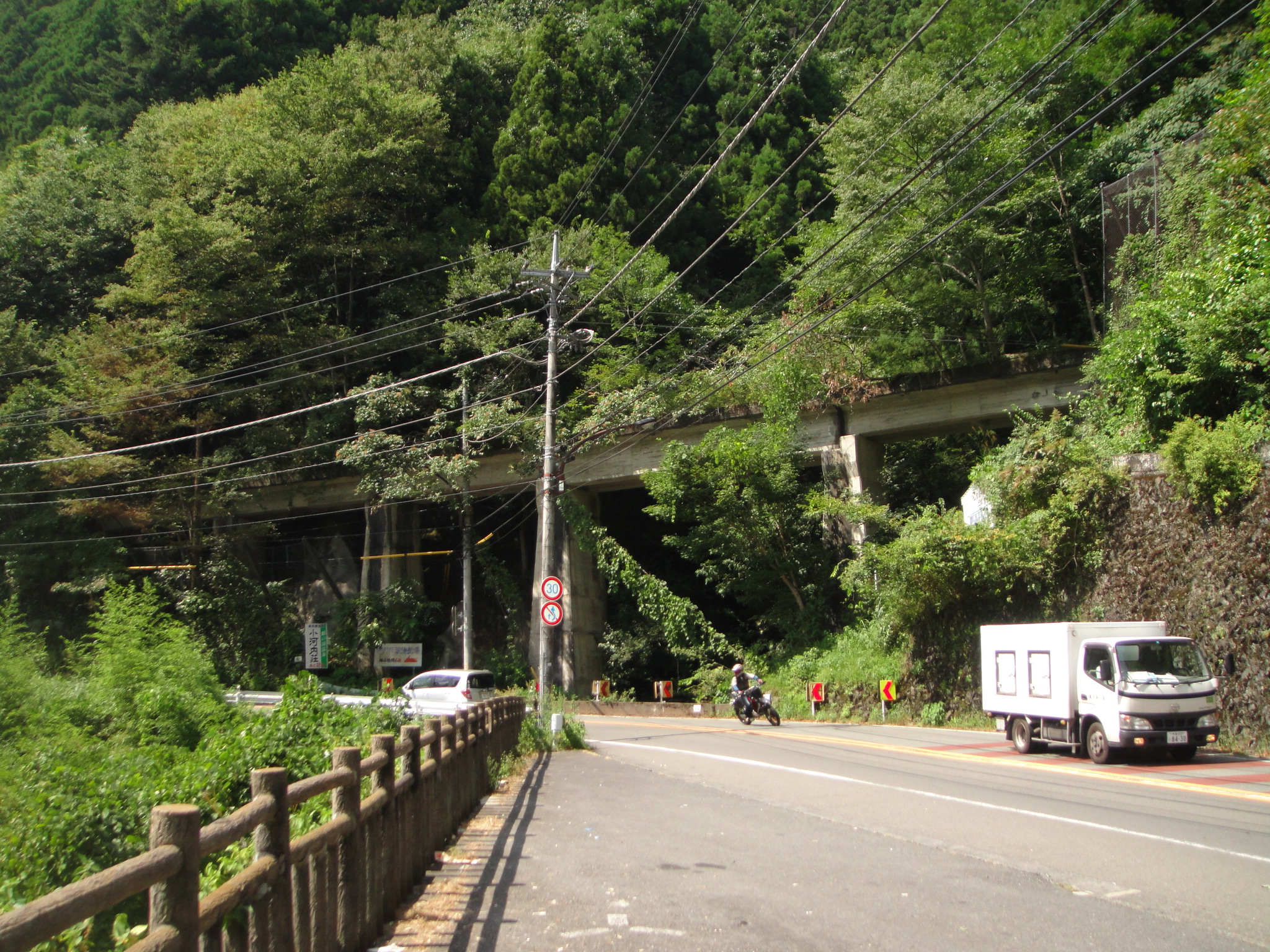
No. 1 Mizune bridge on the Ogouchi dam line (now Mizune Freight Line)

The section between Tachikawa and Ōme was opened in 1894 by the Ōme Railway as a 762 mm (2 ft 6 in) gauge line, extended 2 km as a freight-only section to Hinatawada the following year. Passenger services were extended to Hinatawada in 1898, and the line was converted to 1,067 mm (3 ft 6 in) in 1908. A further freight-only section opened to Miyanohira in 1914, and to Futamatao in 1920. Passenger services were extended to Miyanohira in 1923, the same year the entire line was electrified at 1,200 V DC. The line was further extended to Mitake in 1929, when the company changed its name to the Ōme Electric Railway Co. and the voltage raised to 1,500 V DC in 1930. Passenger services were extended to Mitake in 1935.

The company was nationalized on 1 April 1944, the same year that the Tachikawa to Nagakami section was double-tracked.

The Okutama Electric Railway was constructing a line from Mitake to Hikawa (now Okutama) when it was nationalised, and the line opened on 1 July 1944, creating the present-day Ōme Line.

The Nakagami to Haijima section was double-tracked in 1946, and direct services to Tokyo commenced in 1949. The Haijima to Higashi-Ōme section was double-tracked between 1961 and 1962, CTC signalling was commissioned in 1971, and freight services ceased in 1998.

On 20 August 2016, station numbering was introduced to the Ōme Line, with stations being assigned station numbers between JC51 (Nishi-Tachikawa) and JC74 (Oku-Tama).

From the timetable revision on 18 March 2023, operation on the Ōme Line has been almost completely divided at Ōme Station, with very few trains operating along the entire length of the line. And then, One-person operation began between Ōme Sta. and Okutama Sta., by which, Through-service from/to Shinjuku Sta. via Chuo Line of Holiday Rapid Okutama was discontinued. But, Ōme Line between Ōme Sta. and Okutama Sta. has been run by Rapid trains which connect with Holiday Rapid Okutama. So, it is necessary for us to change trains from Shinjuku to Okutama and from Okutama to Tokyo at Ōme Station.

In February 2015, JR East announced plans to introduce Green (first class) cars on Chuo Line (Rapid) and through-running Ome Line services from fiscal 2020. They planned to add two bilevel Green cars to 10- and 6-car E233-0 series EMU sets, forming 12- and 8-car sets. Work was undergoing to lengthen station platforms and depot facilities to handle the longer trains. Since 15 March 2025, Green cars service has been operating on trains which are 12-Car formation between Ōme Sta. and Tokyo Sta. via Chuo Line.

=== Former connecting lines ===
- Oku-Tama Station: The Tokyo Waterworks Bureau operated a 7 km line to the Ogouchi dam during its construction between 1952 and 1957. It featured 23 tunnels and 23 bridges. In 1963, it was transferred to the Seibu Railway. After that the Okutama Limestone Quarrying Co. got it from Seibu Railway in 1978. Tokyo-to Senyōsen Ogouchi Line(東京都専用線小河内線) is now known as the Mizune Freight Line, and it is not discontinued, but unused as of 2026.
