= Mitake Station (Tokyo) =

Railway station in Ōme, Tokyo, Japan

JC69 Mitake Station 御嶽駅
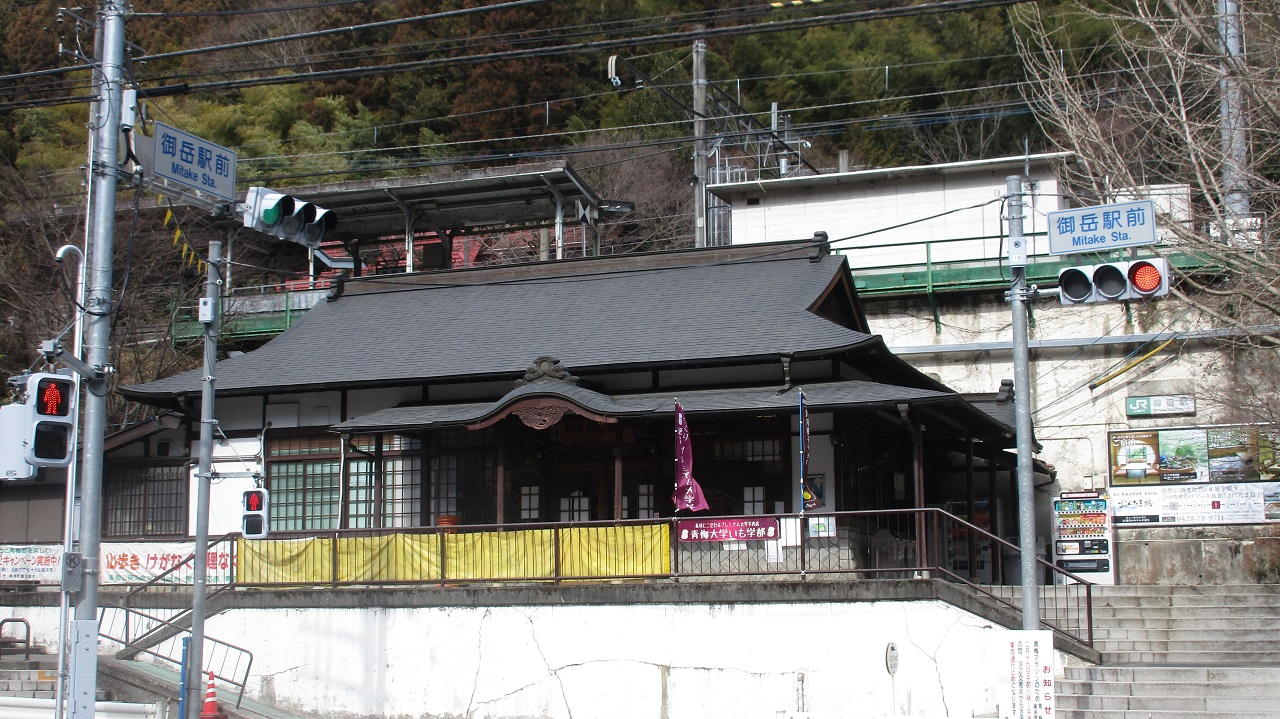
- Mitake Station, February 2017

General information
- Location: 1310 Mitake-honcho, Ōme-shi, Tokyo-to 198-0173; Japan
- Coordinates: 35.8014°N 139.1825°E
- Operator: JR East
- Line: Ōme Line
- Distance: 27.2 km from Tachikawa
- Platforms: 1 island platform

Other information
- Status: Unstaffed
- Station code: JC69
- Website: Official website

History
- Opened: 1 September 1929

Passengers
- FY2014: 683

Services
Preceding station	JR East	Following station
Kawai JC70 towards Oku-Tama	Ōme Line Rapid Local	Sawai JC68 towards Tachikawa
Location
- Location within Tokyo Location within Japan

Mitake Station (御嶽駅, Mitake-eki) is a passenger railway station located in the city of Ōme, Tokyo, Japan, operated by the East Japan Railway Company (JR East). It is notable for the distinctive pagoda-style roof on the station building.

== Lines ==
Mitake Station is served by the Ōme Line, located 27.2 kilometers from the terminus of the line at Tachikawa Station.

== Station layout ==
The station has one island platform serving two tracks, connected to the station building by an underground passage. The station is unattended

=== Platforms ===
1	Ōme Line	for Okutama
2	Ōme Line	for Ōme, Tachikawa, Shinjuku, and Tokyo

== History ==
The station opened on 1 September 1929. It was nationalized on 1 April 1944. It became part of the East Japan Railway Company (JR East) with the breakup of the Japanese National Railways on 1 April 1987.

== Passenger statistics ==
In fiscal 2014, the station was used by an average of 683 passengers daily (boarding passengers only).

== Surrounding area ==
- Mount Mitake (Tokyo)
- Tama River
- former Ōme Kaidō highway

== Bus routes ==
- Toei Bus
  - 梅76 - For Ōme Station (Runs on holidays only)
- Nishi Tokyo Bus
  - Cable shita (Mitake Tozan Railway Takimoto Station is located near this bus stop)

== See also ==
- List of railway stations in Japan
