= Japan National Route 411 =

Road in Japan

National Route 411
- 国道411号
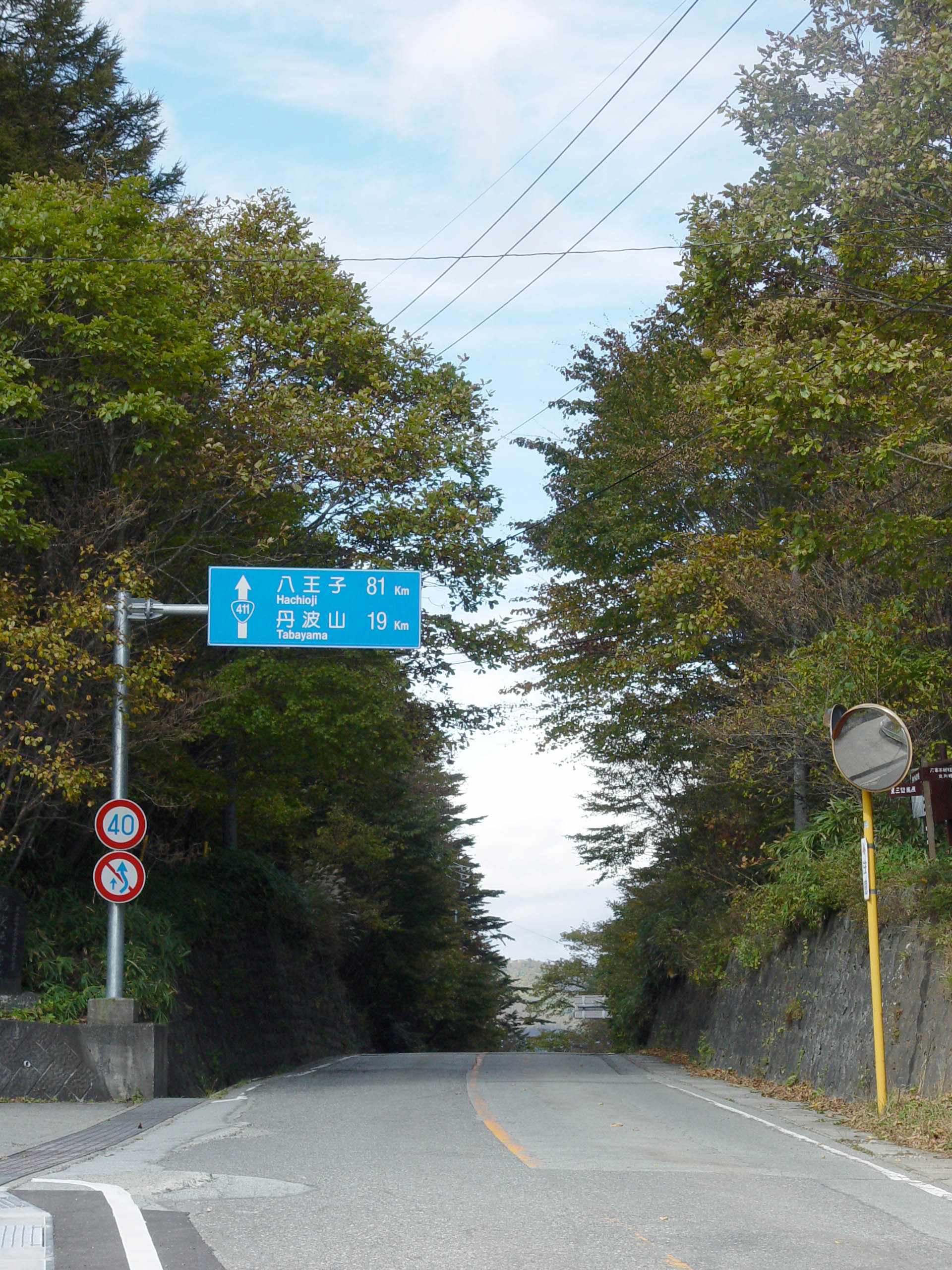

Route information
- Length: 118.5 km (73.6 mi)
- Existed: 1982–present

Major junctions
- West end: National Route 52 National Route 358, in Kōfu
- East end: National Route 16 in Hachiōji

Location
- Country: Japan

Highway system
- National highways of Japan; Expressways of Japan
← National Route 410	→ National Route 412

National Route 411 is a national highway of Japan connecting Hachiōji and Kōfu in Japan, with a total length of 118.5 km (73.63 mi).
