= Ōme Station =

Railway station in Ōme, Tokyo, Japan

JC62 Ōme Station 青梅駅
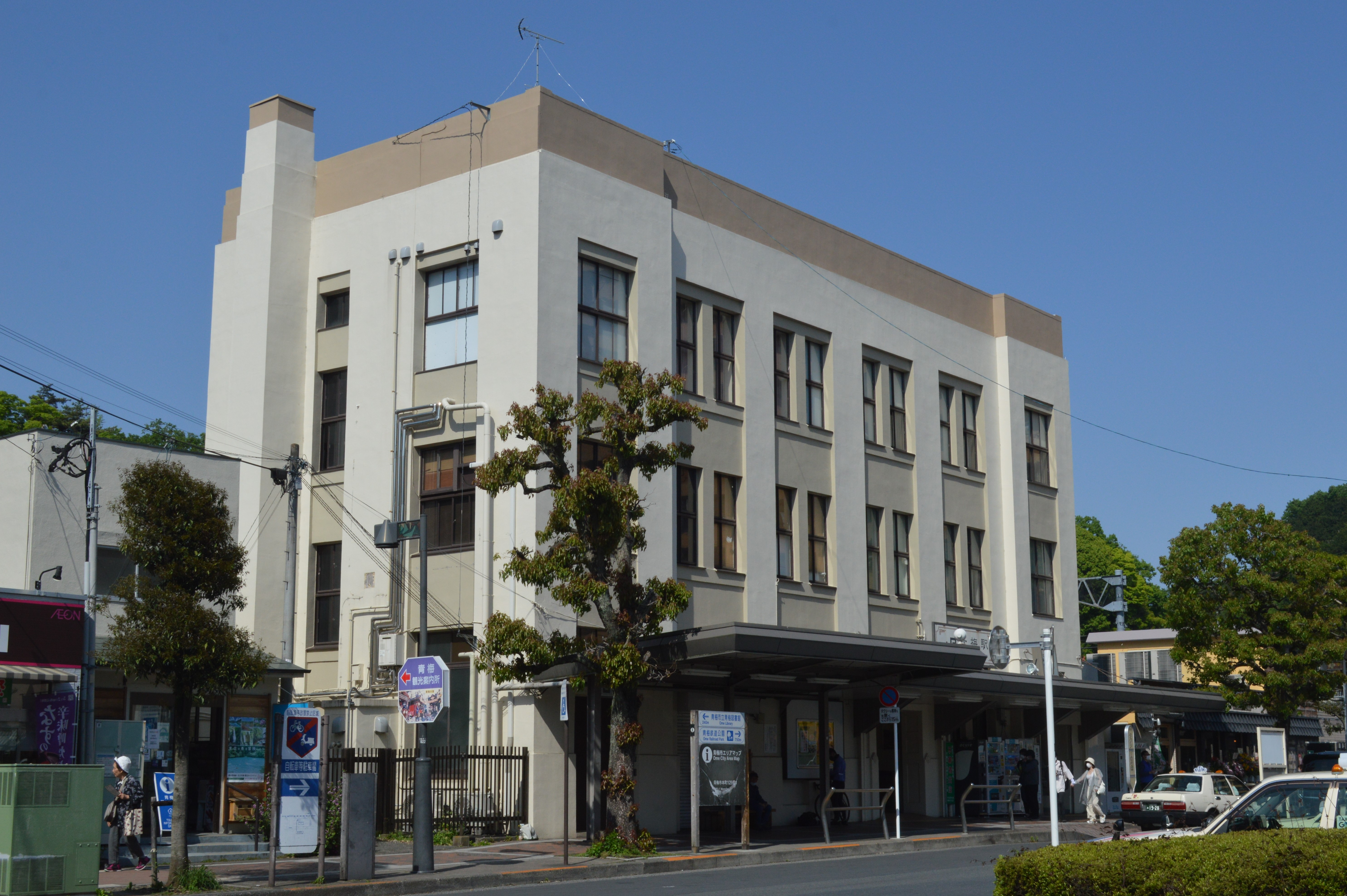
- Ōme Station, 2022

General information
- Location: 192 Honcho, Ōme-shi, Tokyo-to 198-0083; Japan
- Coordinates: 35.7906°N 139.2582°E
- Operator: JR East
- Line: Ōme Line
- Distance: 18.5 km from Tachikawa
- Platforms: 1 island platform

Other information
- Status: Staffed (Midori no Madoguchi)
- Station code: JC62
- Website: Official website

History
- Opened: 19 November 1894

Passengers
- FY2024: 10,962 (daily)

Services
Preceding station	JR East	Following station
Terminus	Ōme Line Commuter Special Rapid Ōme Special Rapid	Higashi-Ōme JC61 towards Tachikawa
Terminus	Ōme Line Commuter Rapid	Higashi-Ōme One-way operation
Miyanohira JC63 towards Oku-Tama	Ōme Line Rapid Local	Higashi-Ōme JC61 towards Tachikawa
Location
- Location within Tokyo Location within Japan

Ōme Station (青梅駅, Ōme-eki) is a passenger railway station located in the city of Ōme, Tokyo, Japan, operated by the East Japan Railway Company (JR East).

== Lines ==
Ōme Station is served by the Ōme Line, it is 18.5 kilometres from the terminus of the line at Tachikawa Station.

== Station layout ==
The station has two island platforms serving four tracks, with a station building connected to the platforms by an underground passage. The station has a Midori no Madoguchi staffed ticket office. The theme song from Himitsu no Akko-chan is used as a departure melody.

=== Platforms ===
1,2	Ōme Line	for Haijima, Tachikawa, Shinjuku, and Tokyo for Mitake and Okutama

3	Ōme Line	for Mitake and Okutama

4	Ōme Line	for Haijima, Tachikawa, Shinjuku, and Tokyo

== History ==
Ōme Station opened on 19 November 1894. It was nationalized in 1944. It became part of the East Japan Railway Company (JR East) with the break-up of the Japanese National Railways in 1987.

== Passenger statistics ==
During FY2024, the station was used on average by 10,962 passengers daily.

Fiscal Year	Daily Average (Note: Data published by the Ministry of Land, Infrastructure, Transport and Tourism state the number of passengers boarding and disembarking by station in a given year. FY2024 covers the period from 1 April 2024 to 31 March 2025. Data published by individual railways directly may state the number boarding only.)
2024	10,962
2023	10,698
2022	10,382
2021	9972
2020	9764
2019	12,994
2018	12,994
2017	13,470
2016	13,718
2015	13,738
2014	14,192
2013	13,986
2012	13,902
2011	14,288

== Surrounding area ==
- Ome Railway Park

== See also ==
- List of railway stations in Japan
