= Tachikawa Station =

Railway station in Tachikawa, Tokyo, Japan

JC19 JN26 Tachikawa Station 立川駅
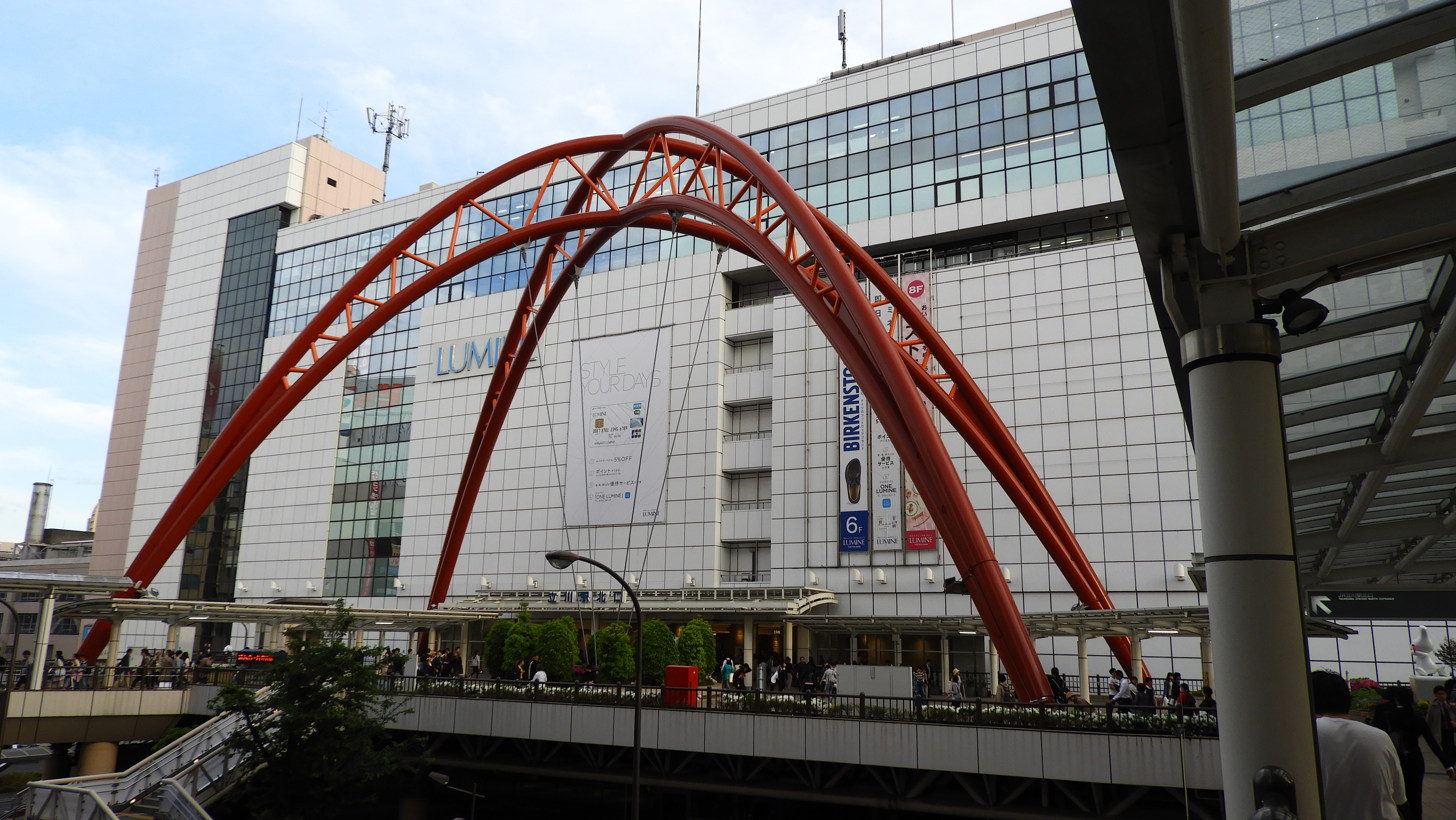
- Lumine Department Store above Tachikawa Station

General information
- Location: 2-1-1 Akebono-cho, Tachikawa City, Tokyo; Japan
- Coordinates: 35°41′54″N 139°24′50″E
- Operator: JR East
- Lines: Chūō Main Line; Chuo Line (Rapid); Nambu Line; Ome Line
- Platforms: 4 island platforms
- Tracks: 8

Construction
- Structure type: At grade

Other information
- Status: Staffed ( "Midori no Madoguchi" )
- Website: Official website

History
- Opened: 11 April 1889; 137 years ago

Passengers
- FY2024: 308,182 (daily) ▲2.29%

Services
Preceding station	JR East	Following station
Hachiōji JC22 towards Hakuba	Azusa	Shinjuku towards Chiba or Tokyo
Hachiōji JC22 towards Ryūō	Kaiji	Shinjuku towards Tokyo
Hachiōji JC22 towards Ōtsuki	Fuji Excursion	Shinjuku Terminus
Hino JC20 towards Shiojiri	Chūō Main Line Local	Terminus
Hachiōji One-way operation	Chūō Line Commuter Special Rapid	Kokubunji JC16 towards Tokyo
Hino JC20 towards Ōtsuki	Chūō Line Chūō Special Rapid	Kokubunji JC16 towards Tokyo
through to Ōme Line	Chūō Line Ōme Special Rapid	Kokubunji JC16 towards Tokyo
Hino JC20 towards Ōtsuki	Chūō Line Commuter Rapid	Kokubunji One-way operation
Hino JC20 towards Ōtsuki	Chūō Line Rapid	Kunitachi JC18 towards Tokyo
Hino JC20 towards Hachiōji	Musashino	Kunitachi JC18 towards Ōmiya
Nishi-Tachikawa One-way operation	Ōme Line Commuter Special Rapid	through to Chūō Line
Nishi-Tachikawa JC51 towards Ōme	Ōme Line Ōme Special Rapid Commuter Rapid	through to Chūō Line
Nishi-Tachikawa JC51 towards Oku-Tama	Ōme Line Rapid	through to Chūō Line
Nishi-Tachikawa JC51 towards Oku-Tama	Ōme Line Local	Terminus
Terminus	Nambu Line Rapid	Bubaigawara JN21 towards Kawasaki
Terminus	Nambu Line Local	Nishi-Kunitachi JN25 towards Kawasaki
Location
- Location within Special wards of Tokyo Location within Japan

Tachikawa Station (立川駅, Tachikawa-eki) is a junction passenger railway station located in the city of Tachikawa, Tokyo, Japan, operated by the East Japan Railway Company (JR East).

== Lines ==
Tachikawa Station is served by the Chūō Main Line, and is located 37.1 kilometers from the starting point of the line at Tokyo Station. It is also a terminus for both the Ōme Line and Nambu Lines. Although the Itsukaichi Line does not reach Tachikawa, a few trains on that line continue along the Ome Line tracks to serve this station.

== Station layout ==
This station consists of four ground-level island platforms serving eight tracks, with an elevated station building located above the platforms. The station has a "Midori no Madoguchi" staffed ticket office. Tachikawa-Minami Station and Tachikawa-Kita Station on the Tama Toshi Monorail Line flank Tachikawa Station, and are connected to it by decks. The Lumine department store occupies the upper floors of the station building.

=== Platforms ===
1,2	Ōme Line	for Haijima, Ome, Oku-Tama; Itsukaichi Line for Musashi Itsukaichi (via Haijima) (Starting service here)
3	■ Chūō Line	for Mitaka, Shinjuku, Tokyo; Chūō Line Limited Express Azusa, Super Azusa, Kaiji, Narita Express
4	Chūō Line (Rapid)	for Mitaka, Shinjuku, Tokyo (Starting service here)
4	Ōme Line	for Haijima, Ome, Oku-Tama; Itsukaichi Line for Musashi Itsukaichi (via Haijima) (Early morning)
5	■ Chūō Line	Chūō Line (Rapid): for Hachioji, Takao, Otsuki; Chūō Main Line: for Otsuki, Kofu and Matsumoto (Starts service here)
5	Chūō Line (Rapid)	for Mitaka, Shinjuku, Tokyo (Starts service here)
5	Ōme Line	for Haijima, Ome, Oku-Tama; Itsukaichi Line for Musashi Itsukaichi (via Haijima) ■ Hachikō Line for Komagawa (via Haijima) (Trains from the Chūō Line through service to Ōme Line will stop at this platform)
6	■ Chūō Line	Chūō Line (Rapid): for Hachioji, Takao, Otsuki; Chūō Main Line: for Otsuki, Kofu and Matsumoto; Chūō Line Limited Express Azusa, Super Azusa, Kaiji, Narita Express
6	Ōme Line	for Haijima, Ome, Oku-Tama; Itsukaichi Line for Musashi Itsukaichi (via Haijima) ■ Hachikō Line for Komagawa (via Haijima) (Trains from the Chūō Line through service to Ōme Line will also stop at this platform)
7,8	Nambu Line	for Fuchūhonmachi, Noborito, Kawasaki

=== Track layout ===
Track layout around Tachikawa Station
	Nambu Line to Kawasaki	Chūō Main Line to Takao, Otsuki, Kofu, Matsumoto
Chūō Main Line to Shinjuku, Tokyo		Chūō Main Line to Takao, Otsuki, Kofu, Matsumoto
	Ōme Line to Haijima, Ome, Oku-Tama

== History ==
The Kōbu Railway, which later became the Chūō Main Line, opened the station on April 11, 1889. The Ōme Railway (presently the Ōme Line) and the Nambu Railway (presently the Nambu Line) were connected to the station on November 19, 1894, and December 11, 1929, respectively.

The Itsukaichi Line was also connected to the station from July 13, 1930, to October 11, 1944, via a separate track between Tachikawa and Haijima, which was closed following the integration of the operation of the Ōme and Itsukaichi lines under the Japanese Government Railways in April 1944.

With the privatization of Japanese National Railways (JNR) on April 1, 1987, the station came under the control of JR East.

== Passenger statistics ==
In fiscal 2019, the station was used by an average of 166,636 passengers daily (boarding passengers only), making it the 16th busiest station in the JR East network. The passenger figures for previous years are as shown below.

Fiscal year	Daily average
2000	132,672
2005	150,009
2010	157,517
2015	163,903
2020	122,033

== See also ==
- List of railway stations in Japan
