= Nishi Tokyo Bus =

Japanese bus company

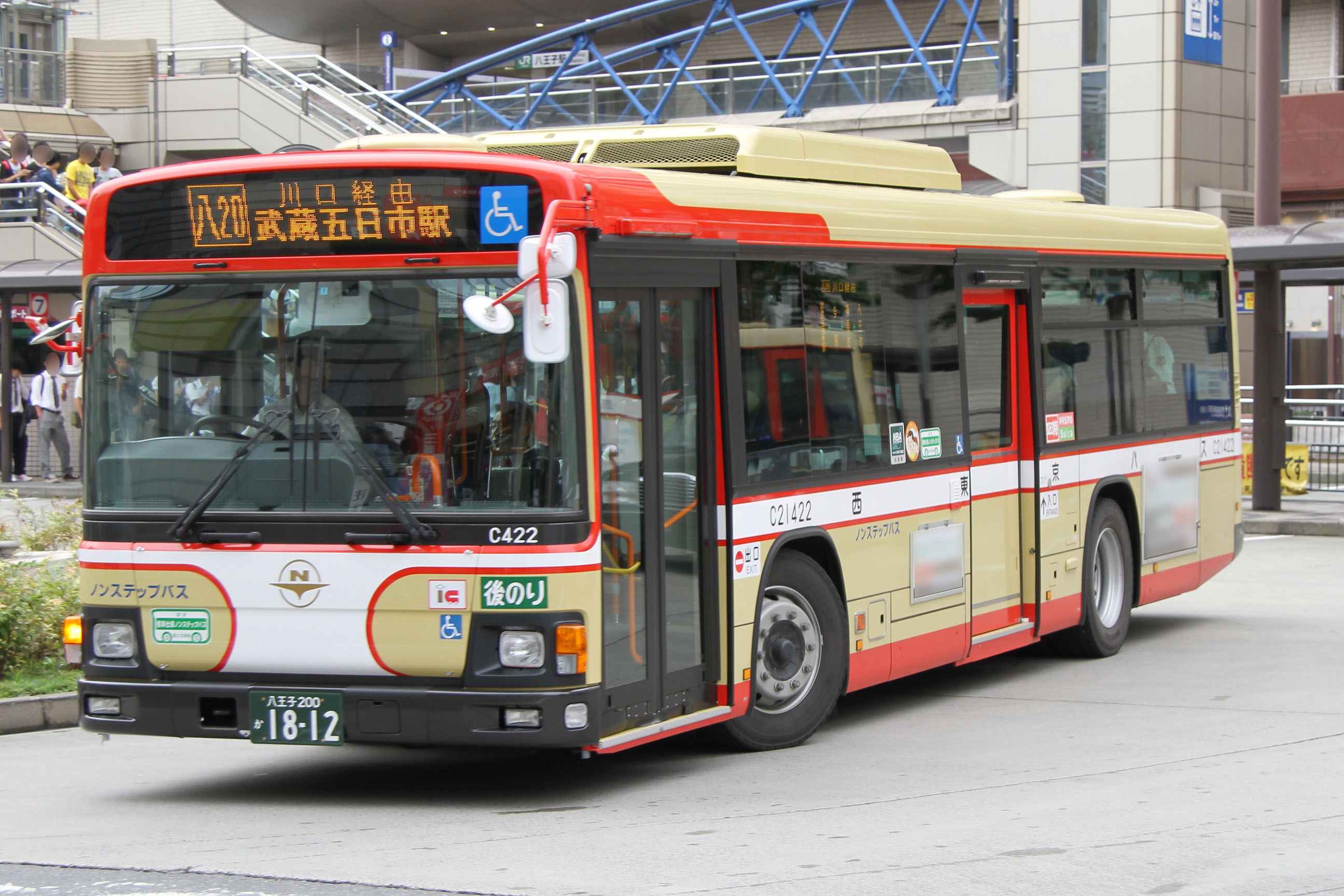
- A Nishi Tokyo Bus car in Hachioji
- Founded: 1963
- Headquarters: Hachiōji, Tokyo, Japan
- Service area: Western Tokyo
- Service type: Bus
- Stations: 4 depots, 2 branch offices
- Fleet: 340 buses (as of July 2007)
- Fuel type: Diesel fuel
- Operator: Nishi Tokyo Bus Co., Ltd.
- Website: http://www.nisitokyobus.co.jp

Nishi Tokyo Bus Co., Ltd. (西東京バス株式会社, Nishi Tōkyō Basu Kabusiki-gaisha) is a bus-operating company in western Tama Area, mainly in Hachioji and Akiruno, Tokyo, Japan. It has Tama Bus Co., Ltd. (多摩バス株式会社, Tama Basu Kabushiki-gaisha) in a subsidiary which once took charge of bus routes in western Hachioji area and Ome area, and expressway bus routes. Although it now belongs to Keio Group, it was originally a bus section of Ome Electric Railway Co. (present JR Ōme Line).

== History ==
Nishi Tokyo Bus is a company established by a merger of Takao Jidōsha Co.(高尾自動車), Okutama Shinkō Co.(奥多摩振興) and Goō Jidōsha Co.(五王自動車) in 1963.

Takao Jidōsha's first route is between Hachiōji Station - Mount Takao foot which started operation in 1916. This is in only three years, after the Keio Denki Kidō (present Keio Corporation) operates around a bus for the first time (temporarily to railroad opening of traffic) in Tokyo in 1913, and in continuous operation, this became the first in the Tokyo-fu. Since This route competed with the route of Hachiōji Shigai Jidōsha (present Keio Dentetsu Bus Hachioji office) which started operation in 1923, Takao Jidōsha established the new route between Hachiōji Station - Kawarajuku, Ongata Village (present Hachioji City) in 1932, extended to Shimo-Ange (下案下) by 1924, and it became the prime route of Takao Jidōsha. It entered under the influence of Keio Teito Electric Railway (present Keio Corporation) in 1955.

Okutama Shinkō is the company which Ome Electric Railway Co. established in 1928 by setting development of an area along the railroad line as the main purpose. The first bus line in Ome and Okutama area is between Futamatao Station (destination station of Ome Electric Railway of those days) and Hatonosu Station which was started operation by Okutama Jidōsha Co. in 1922. Ome Electric Railway purchased the Okutama Jidōsha in 1930, and it extended to Hikawa (Oku-Tama Station) in August of the same year. Although the railroad section of Ome Electric Railway was nationalized (present JR Ome Line) and the bus section operated by Ome Electric Railway succeedingly in April, 1944, all the bus enterprises of the Ome Electric Railway were transferred to the Okutama Shinkō, its subsidiary in April, 1946. Okutama Shinkō entered under the influence of Keio Teito Electric Railway in 1956.

In 1920, Ishikawa Jidōsha was replaced with the stagecoach which operated between Imaguma, Kawaguchi-mura (present Hachioji) - Hachioji (Hiraokachō) until then, and started operation of the bus of track reconstruction between Itsukaichi - Hachioji. It extended to Hachioji station in 1924, and the company name was changed into Goō Jidōsha Shōkai (it incorporated in 1947 and was re-change to Goō Jidōsha). It entered under the influence of Keio Teito Electric Railway in 1961.

The three companies which used as the influence of Keio Teito Electric Railway, moved to the joint head office of the Keio Line Higashi-Hachioji station (present Keio Hachioji station) next door in April, 1963 for merger preparation aiming at rationalization of bus operation, Okutama Shinkō merged other two companies on October 1, and Nishi Tokyo Bus launched. The symbol of a company is what designed the initial of Nishi Tokyo "NT" in the circle, and T imagined speediness and the feather of a bird, and it is published in the front of all the vehicles of a general route vehicle until it continues up to now. Since the number of routes increased rapidly by "bed-town"-izing of Hachioji and advance of educational facilities such as universities, and it became impossible to be unable to respond by at the existing office after the 1970s, Narahara Office was established newly in 1971 and Ongata Office is established newly in 1992.

Tama bus was split up by whole ownership and change of jurisdiction and commission of operation of an unprofitable route were started on April 1, 1999. Thereby, Ome Office was transferred to the Tama bus from 1999 to 2000, and Ongata Office from 2000 to 2005. On August 5, 2008, the official website of Nishi Tokyo Bus announced that it unified the bus division of Tama Bus and succeeded all the routes which Tama bus operated from the first bus on September 1 of the same year, in order to attain improvement in convenience and the increase in efficiency of business operation. Although Tama bus which business was transferred remains as a company, and will concentrate on enterprises, such as lease, management, etc. of land and a building, from now on.

On September 30, 2007, a smart card "PASMO" was introduced into the some area around Hachioji, and was introduced also into all the remaining areas on January 25, 2009.

== Depots ==
- Head Office - 1-7, Myōjinchō 3-chōme, Hachioji, Tokyo, Japan
- Narahara Bus Office (楢原営業所) - 591-1, Naraharachō, Hachioji, Tokyo, Japan
  - Nakano Gakuen Branch Office (中野学園車庫) - 1100, Tobukimachi, Hachioji, Tokyo, Japan
- Itsukaichi Bus Office (五日市営業所) - 24, Tateyadai, Akiruno, Tokyo, Japan
  - Hikawa Branch Office (氷川車庫) - 213, Hikawa, Okutama, Tokyo, Japan
- Ome Bus Office (青梅営業所) - 3-3, Suehirochō 1-chōme, Ome, Tokyo, Japan
- Ongata Bus Office (恩方営業所) - 281-1, Shimo-Ongatamachi, Hachioji, Tokyo, Japan

Ome and Ongata depots were depots of Tama Bus till August 31, 2008.

== Major routes ==
=== Expressway bus routes ===
All expressway bus routes were operated by Tama Bus till August 31, 2008.

Route name	Japanese	Terminals		via	Co-operator(s)	History	Notes
Hachiōji - Shibuya - Kaga Line	八王子・渋谷 - 金沢・加賀線	Hachiōji Station	Kagaonsen Station	Shibuya Mark City, Kanazawa Station, Komatsu Station	Hokuriku Railroad	Started as Hachioji - Kanazawa Line on August 3, 1992; changed to Shibuya - Kaga Line on July 6, 2007; changed to current route on Mar. 1, 2010 (also started the service in the daytime).	
"Twinkle"	ツィンクル号	Shinjuku Highway Bus Terminal	Abenobashi Station	Hachiōji Station, Ibaraki Station, Osaka Station	Kintetsu Bus	Started on December 6, 1989 and on November 9, 1990 as Hachioji-Osaka Line "Trendy". Two routes merged on Dec. 1, 2006.	
"Hello Bridge"	ハローブリッジ号	Hachiōji Station	Marugame Station	Shinjuku Highway Bus Terminal, Yokohama Station, Takamatsu Station	Shikoku Kōsoku Bus	Started as Shinjuku - Takamatsu Line on October 14, 1989; changed to Hachiōji - Shinjuku - Yokohama - Marugame Line on Dec. 1, 2008	
"Orange Liner Ehime"	オレンジライナーえひめ号	Shinjuku Highway Bus Terminal	Yawatahama	Chuo Expwy Hino B.S., Dōgo Onsen, Matsuyamashi Station	Iyo Railway	Started on May 2, 1990; extended to Yawatahama on Sep. 1, 2008.	
Hachiōji - Haneda Airport Line	八王子 - 羽田空港線	Takao Station, Hachiōji Station	Haneda Airport	Chuo Expwy Hino B.S.	Airport Transport Service, Keio Bus Minami	Started on Nov. 23 2003	
Hachiōji - Narita Airport Line	八王子 - 成田空港線	Hachiōji Station	Narita Airport		Airport Transport Service	Started the joint operation with Airport Transport Service on Mar. 17, 2008	
Ōme - Haneda Airport Line	青梅 - 羽田空港線	Kabe Station	Haneda Airport	Ozaku Station, Hamura Station, Fussa Station		Started on Mar. 26, 2011	

==== Defunct route ====
Route name	Japanese	Terminals		via	Co-operator(s)	History	Notes
"New Epoch"	ニューエポック号	Hachioji Station	Sendai Station		Miyagi Transportation	Started on August 7, 1990; discontinued on Aug. 31, 1996.	
"Kyoto"	きょうと号	Hachioji Station	Kyoto Station	Sanjō Station	Keihan Bus	Started on June 22, 1990; discontinued on March 30, 2007.	
"Trendy"	トレンディ号	Hachioji Station	Abenobashi Station	Ibaraki Station, Osaka Station	Kintetsu Bus	Started on November 9, 1990; merged with the "Twinkle" route on Dec. 1, 2006.	
"Casual Twinkle"	カジュアル・ツィンクル号	Shinjuku Highway Bus Terminal	Abenobashi Station	Ibaraki Station, Osaka Station	Kintetsu Bus	Started on March 22, 2002; withdrew on Apr. 24, 2008.	Discount route.

=== Regular routes ===
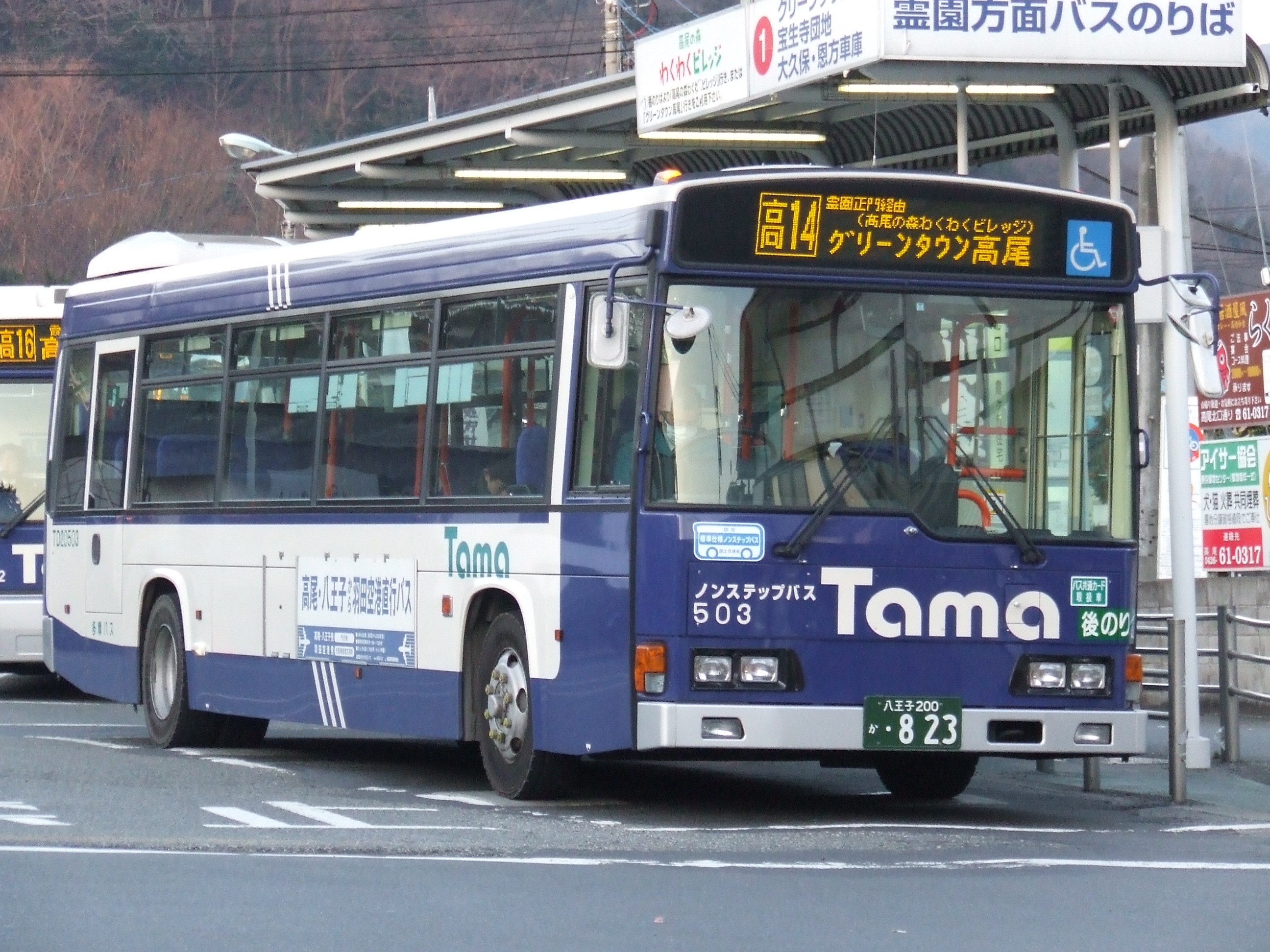
A former Tama Bus car

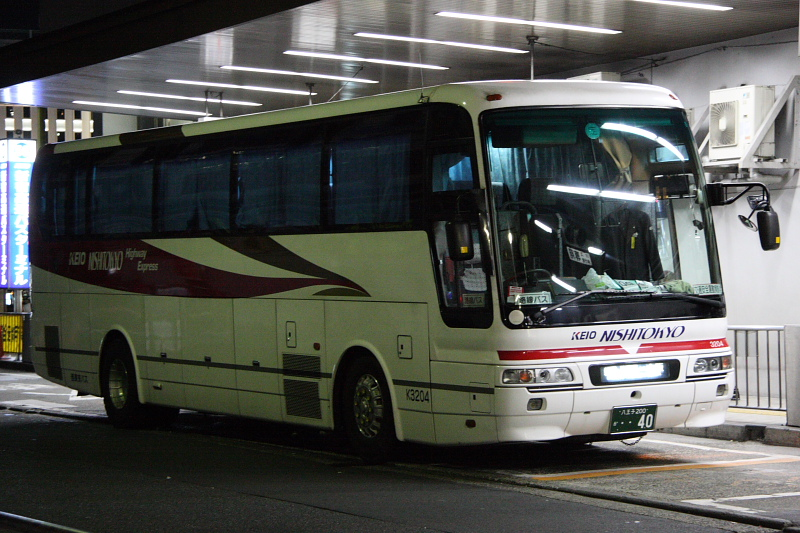
A Nishi Tokyo Bus expressway route car

- From Hino Station
  - for Utsugidai (宇津木台) via Komiyamachi (小宮町)
  - for Hachiōji Station via Komiya Station Entrance (小宮駅入口)
- From Keio Hachiōji Station and JR Hachiōji Station
  - for Utsugidai via By-pass Ōya (バイパス大谷) and via Kita-Hachiōji Station (北八王子駅)
  - for Junshin Academy (純心女子学園) and Tobuki (戸吹) via Sanyū (左入)
  - for Soka University Daimon (創価大学大門), Junshin Academy and Tobuki via Babayato (馬場谷戸)
  - for Soka University Eikō Gate and Tobuki via Hiyodoriyama-tunnel (ひよどり山トンネル) and Roadside Station Hachiōji-Takiyama (道の駅八王子滝山)
  - for Narahara Bus Office (楢原町) via Jinja-mae (神社前)
  - for Imaguma (今熊) and Musashi-Itsukaichi Station (武蔵五日市駅) via Naraharachō and Kawaguchi Elementary School (川口小学校)
  - for Tokyo Summerland (サマーランド) and Akigawa Station (秋川駅) via Naraharachō and Tobuki-Yuttarikan (戸吹湯ったり館)
  - for Narahara Bus Office and Kogakuin University (工学院大学) via Nishi-Nakano (西中野)
  - for Matsue-Jūtaku (松枝住宅) via City Hall east(市役所入口・元本郷公園東) and Yokokawachō-Jūtaku (横川町住宅) and Izumichō-Jūtaku (泉町住宅)
  - for Hōshōji-Danchi (宝生寺団地) via Yotsuya (四谷)
  - for Ōkubo (大久保) via Yotsuya and Odano (小田野)
  - for Ongata-Bus Terminal (恩方ターミナル) via Yotsuya and Ongata-Eigyōsho (恩方営業所)
  - for Takao Station South Exit (高尾駅南口) via Yotsuya and Motohachi Branchi Office (元八事務所)
- From Nishi-Hachiōji Station
  - for Narahara Bus Office via Hachiōji City Hall (八王子市役所) and Nishi-Nakano
  - for Matsue-Jūtaku via City Hall east and Yokokawachō-Jūtaku and Izumichō-Jūtaku
  - for Ongata-Terminal via Yotsuya and Uenohara (上野原)
  - for Green Town Takao (グリーンタウン高尾) and Takao Station North Exit via Chuo Expressway Moto-Hachioji Bus Stop (中央道八王子バス停下)
- From Takao Station North Exit
  - for Ongata-Shako via Reien-Seimon (霊園正門)
  - for Homest Town (ホーメストタウン) via Shiroyama-Ōhashi (城山大橋)
  - for Hōshōji-Danchi via Reien-Seimon
  - for Takao-no-mori Wakuwaku Village (高尾の森わくわくビレッジ) via Reien-Seimon
  - for Ōkubo and Jinba-Plateau-Shita (陣馬高原下) via Reien-Seimon
  - for Miyamachō (美山町) via Reien-Seimon and Ongata Bus Terminal
- From Haijima Station
  - for Kyorin University (杏林大学) via Takatsuki (高月) and Tobuki
  - for Junshin Academy via Takatsuki
- From Fussa Station
  - for Akigawa Station and Musashi-Itsukaichi Station via Akiruno City Office (あきる野市役所)
  - for Hinode-Orikaeshijō (日の出折返場) via Akigawa Station and Æon Mall Hinode Shopping mall (イオンモール日の出)
  - for Soka University and Junshin Academy via Takatsuki
  - for Ozaku Station West (小作駅西口) via Hamura Station West (羽村駅西)
- From Hamura Station
  - Shimmachi 9-chome circulation (新町9丁目循環)
- From Ozaku Station
  - Mitsuhara Circulation (三ツ原循環)
  - for Sugao High School (菅生高校) via Tomoda (友田)
  - for Ōme Station (青梅駅) via Tomoda
  - for Akigawa Station via Sugasebashi (菅瀬橋)
- From Mitake Station
  - for Mitake tozan railway Takimoto station (ケーブル下)
- From Oku-Tama Station
  - for Kamihinata (上日向) and Seitōbashi (清東橋) via Kawai Station
  - for Higashi-Nippara (東日原) and Nippara-Shōnyūdō (鍾乳洞)
  - for Lake Okutama (奥多摩湖), Tozura (留浦), Kamosawa-Nishi (鴨沢西) and Taba (丹波)
  - for Minetani (峰谷) via Lake Okutama
  - for Kosuge (小菅) via Lake Okutama
  - for Kosugenoyu Hot spring(小菅の湯)
- From Akigawa Station
  - for Sugao High School
- From Musashi-Itsukaichi Station
  - for Matsuo (松尾) and Tsurutsuru-Onsen (つるつる温泉) via Sajigami (幸神)
  - for Akikawa-keikoku Seotonoyu (秋川渓谷瀬音の湯), Hossawa Fall Ent.(払沢の滝入口), Kazuma (数馬), Kami-Yōsawa (上養沢), Koiwa (小岩) and Fujikura (藤倉) via Jūrigi (十里木)
  - for Tomin no mori (都民の森)

=== Community Bus routes ===
- Hachi-Bus (はちバス, Hachibasu) in Hachioji City
- Runo-Bus (るのバス, Runobasu) in Akiruno City
- Hamurun (はむらん, Hamuran) in Hamura City
- Hinode Utopia-go (日の出ユートピア号, Hinode Yūtopiagō) in Hinode Town - defunct on Jun. 9, 2008.

== Buses ==
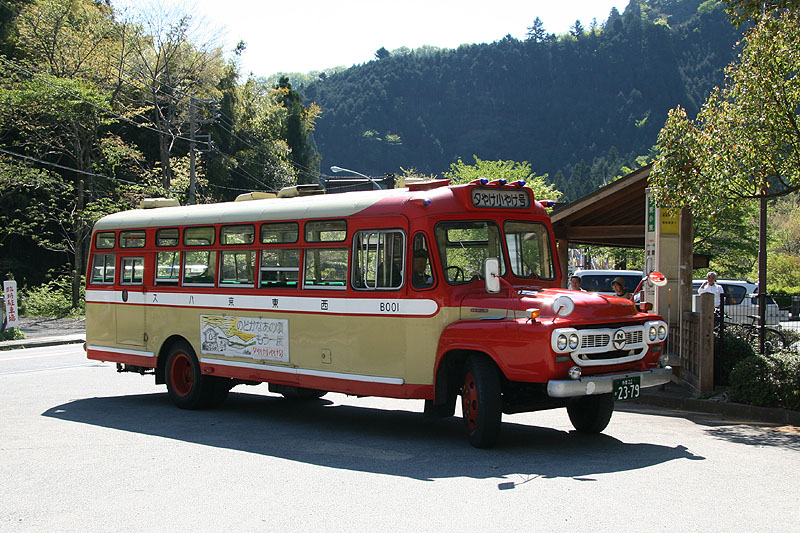
BXD50 bonnet bus made in 1967

Nishi Tokyo Bus owns the buses below:

- Hino Motors
  - Blue Ribbon II non-step
  - Rainbow RJ middle-size bus
  - Rainbow HR / Rainbow II middle-size non-step bus
  - S'elega for expressway bus routes
- Isuzu
  - Erga non-step
  - Erga Mio non-step
  - BXD50 bonnet bus - It was operated as "Yūyake-Koyake-go" till May, 2007.
- Mitsubishi Fuso
  - Aero Queen for expressway bus routes
- Nissan Diesel
  - JP, a middle-size bus with long body.
  - UA non-step
  - RA non-step and one-step with FLENDS system (low emission technology)

== See also ==
- List of bus operating companies in Japan (east)
- Keio Corporation
- Keio Dentetsu Bus
