= Nippara cave =

Cave in Tokyo, Japan

Nippara Shōnyūdō
- 日原鍾乳洞
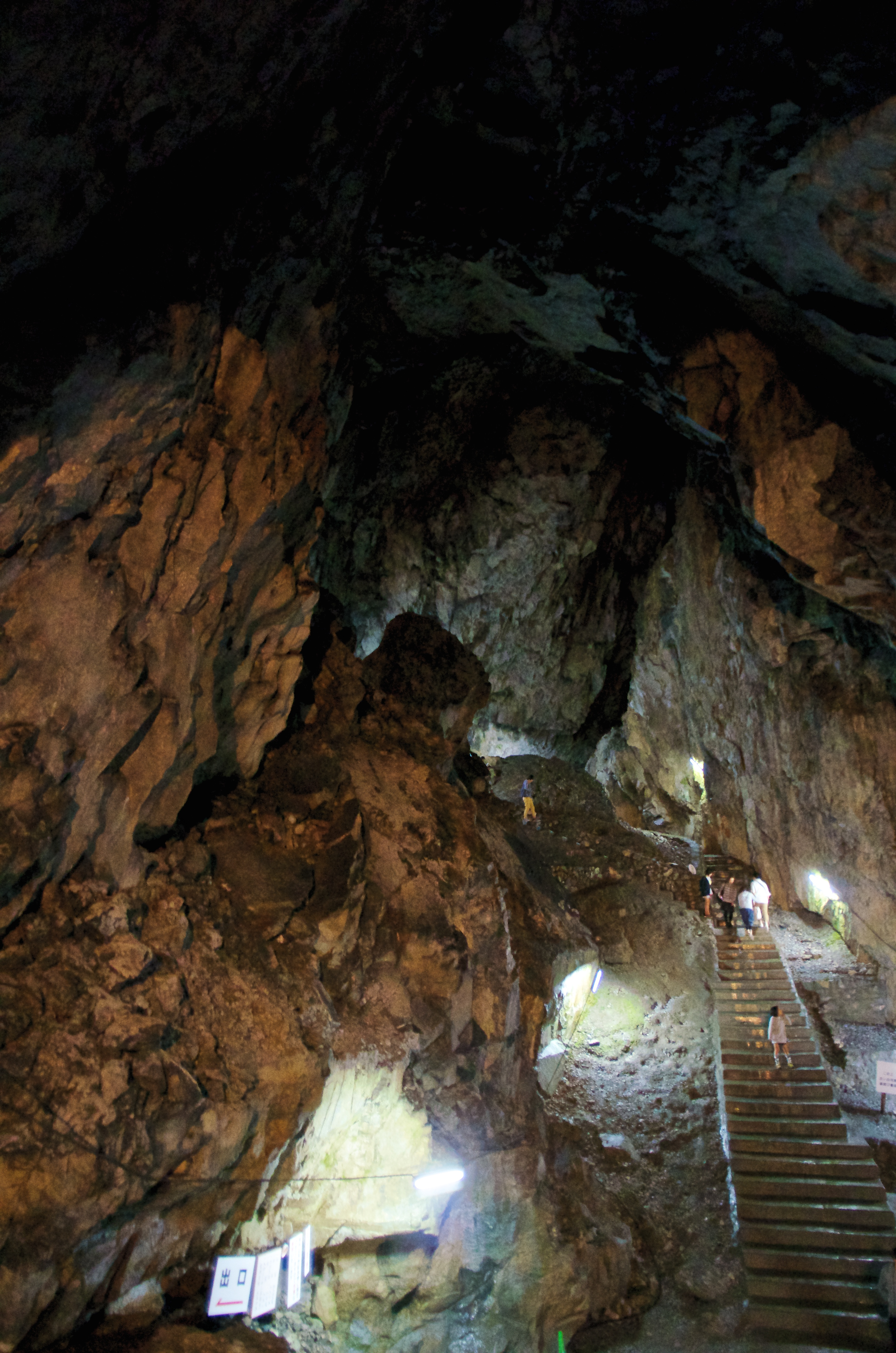
- Limestone cave

- Location within Tokyo Location within Japan
- Location: 1052 Nippara, Nishitama District, Tokyo, Japan
- Coordinates: 35.852611°N 139.040444°E
- Geology: Solutional cave

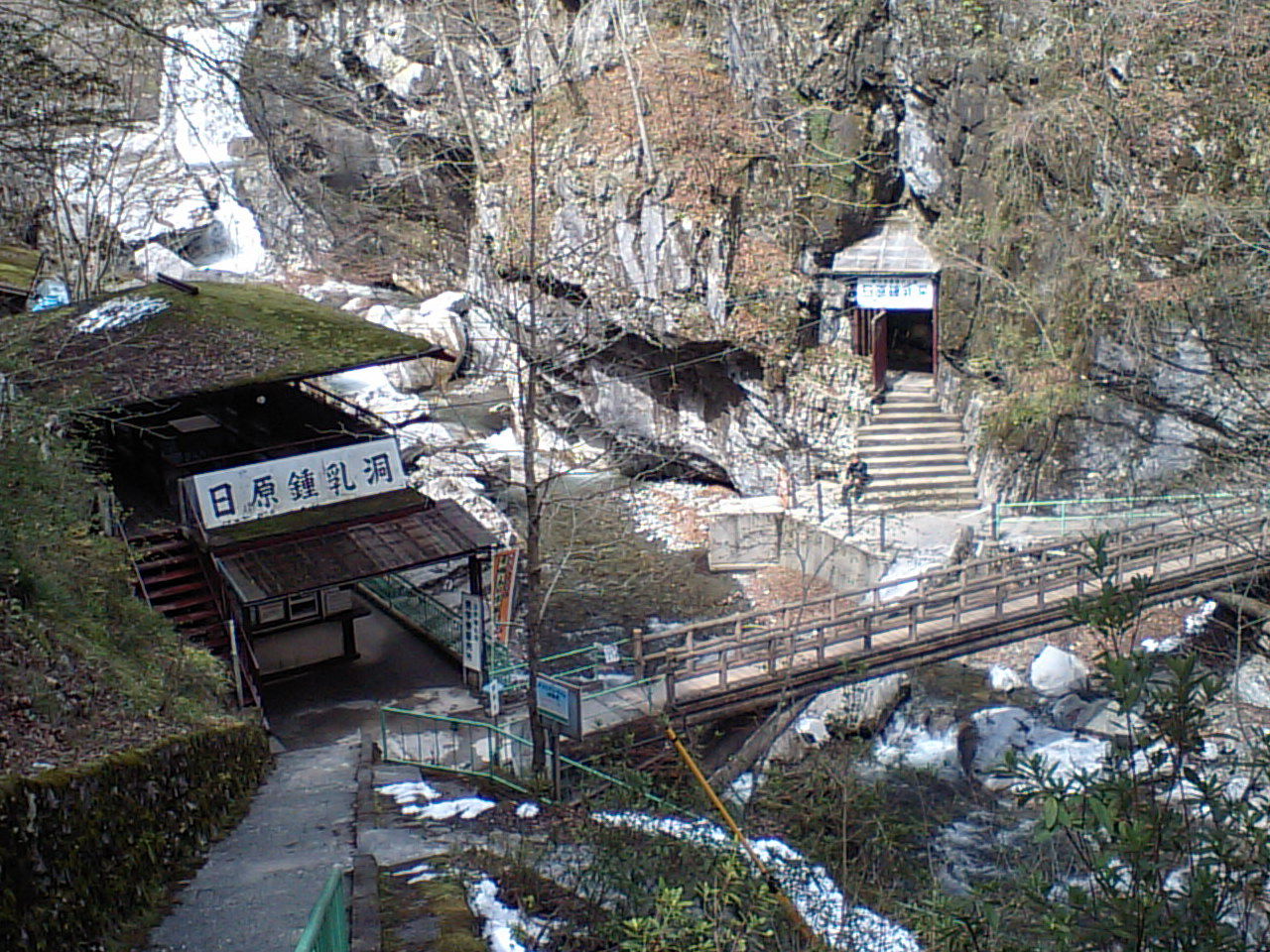
Entrance

Nippara Shōnyūdō (Japanese: 日原鍾乳洞, lit. 'Nippara limestone cave'), located in Nippara, Okutama, Nishitama District, Tokyo, Japan, is a limestone cave. It is over 1270m long from the entrance to the end, and it measures 134m from the depths to the ceiling. It has been registered a natural monument in Tokyo; equally large as Roukokudō, the two caves are known as one of the largest caves in the Kanto region. The cave flourished as a sacred mountain in the past and is a well-known tourist site as of modern times. The cave is opened throughout almost the entire year excluding between 30 December and 3 January.

== Outline ==
In the cave, there are stratums from the Paleozoic era. The temperature in the cave stays at eleven degrees Celsius throughout the year. The Shingū Dō reaches 527 meters in depth, being of largest scale in the cave.

There are many mineral formations of stalagmite and stalactite, which are named Kongōzue (金剛杖) by practitioners of Shugendō in the Edo era.

== Access ==
The cave is open to public from 9 a.m. to 5 p.m. between 1 April and 30 November, and from 9 a.m. to 4:30 p.m. between 1 December and 31 March.

=== Fees ===
As of 2020, the cave is operated by Nippara Hoshōkai and there are entrance fees to enter the cave.

Age group	Regular fee (per person)	Discounted fees for groups of 25 or more (per person)
Adult	800 yen	700 yen
Junior Highshool Students	600 yen	500 yen
Elementary School Students	500 yen	400 yen

=== Transportation ===
It takes about 30 minutes to travel to the cave by Nishi Tokyo Bus from Okutama Station of the JR East Ōme Line. Nippara Shōnyūdō bus stop is the closest bus stop to the cave. However, the route bus does not stop at this stop on holidays. On holidays, the nearest bus stop is Higashi-Nippara, which is about a 20 minute-walk away from the cave.

The Tokyo Metropolitan Route 204 passes through around the cave, but the road is narrow and curved, and has falling rocks.

== See also ==
- Chichibu Tama Kai National Park
- Mount Kumotori
