= Hamura Station =

Railway station in Hamura, Tokyo, Japan

JC58 Hamura Station 羽村駅
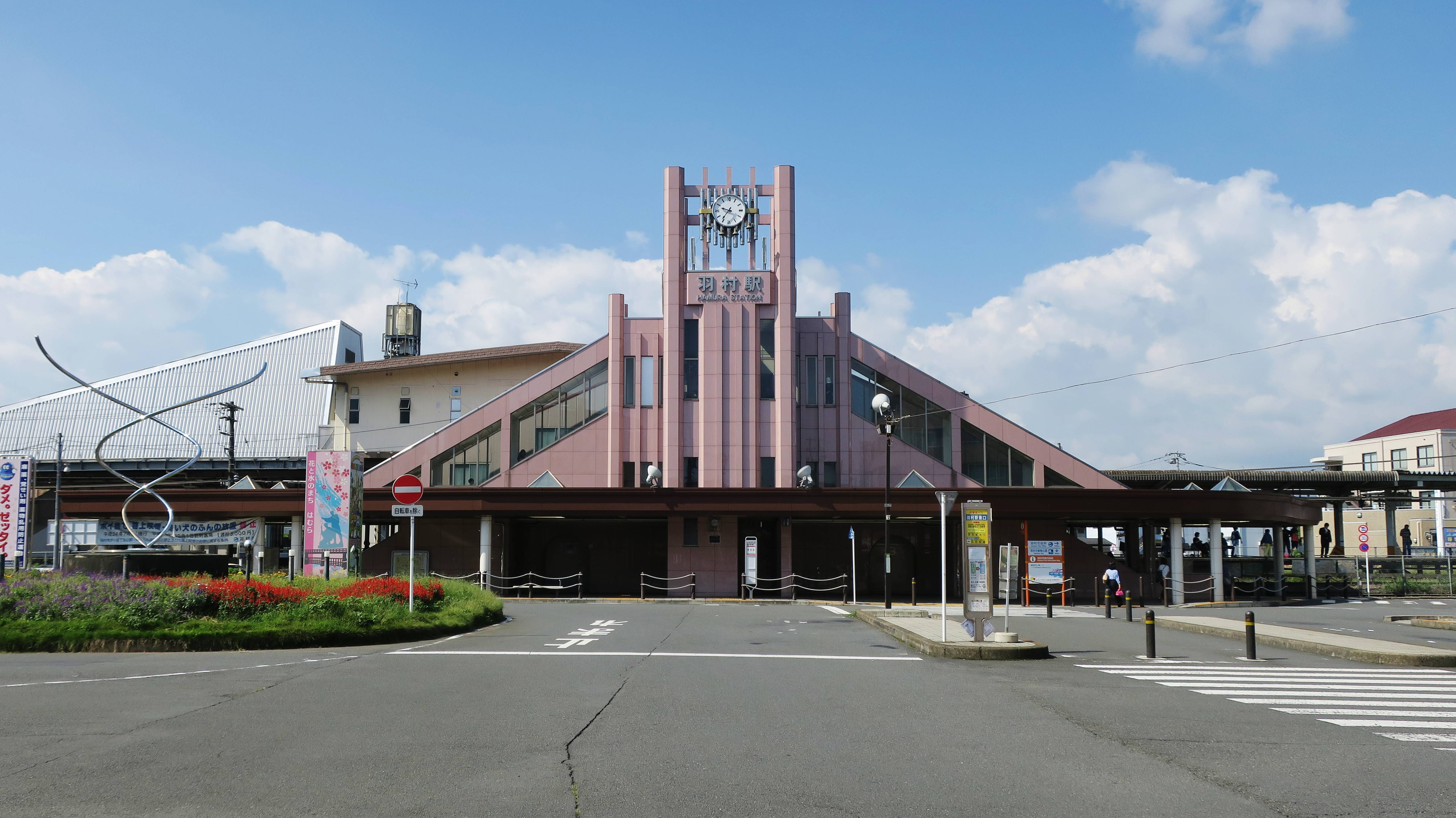
- The east side of Hamura Station in September 2017

General information
- Location: 1-7 Hanehigashi, Hamura-shi, Tokyo 205-0014; Japan
- Coordinates: 35.7580°N 139.3159°E
- Operator: JR East
- Line: Ōme Line
- Distance: 11.7 km from Tachikawa
- Platforms: 1 island platform
- Tracks: 2

Other information
- Status: Staffed
- Website: Official website

History
- Opened: 19 November 1894

Passengers
- FY2019: 13,687 daily

Services
Preceding station	JR East	Following station
Ozaku One-way operation	Ōme Line Commuter Special Rapid	Fussa JC57 towards Tachikawa
Ozaku JC59 towards Ōme	Ōme Line Ōme Special Rapid	Fussa JC57 towards Tachikawa
Ozaku JC59 towards Ōme	Ōme Line Commuter Rapid	Fussa One-way operation
Ozaku JC59 towards Oku-Tama	Ōme Line Rapid Local	Fussa JC57 towards Tachikawa
Location
- Location within Tokyo Location within Japan

Hamura Station (羽村駅, Hamura-eki) is a passenger railway station located in the city of Hamura, Tokyo, Japan, operated by East Japan Railway Company (JR East).

== Lines ==
Hamura Station is served by the Ōme Line, and is located 11.7 kilometers from the starting point of the line at Tachikawa Station.

== Station layout ==
This station has a single ground-level island platform serving two tracks, with an elevated station building above the platform. The station is staffed.

=== Platforms ===
1	Ōme Line	for Ōme and Okutama
2	Ōme Line	for Tachikawa, Shinjuku, and Tokyo

== History ==
The station opened on 19 November 1894. With the privatization of Japanese National Railways (JNR) on 1 April 1987, the station came under the control of JR East.

== Passenger statistics ==
In fiscal 2019, the station was used by an average of 13,687 passengers daily (boarding passengers only).

The passenger figures for previous years are as shown below.

Fiscal year	Daily average
2005	14,527
2010	13,970
2015	13,893

== Surrounding area ==
- Tama River
- Hamura City Hall

== See also ==
- List of railway stations in Japan
