= Kori Station =

Railway station in Okutama, Tokyo, Japan

JC71 Kori Station 古里駅
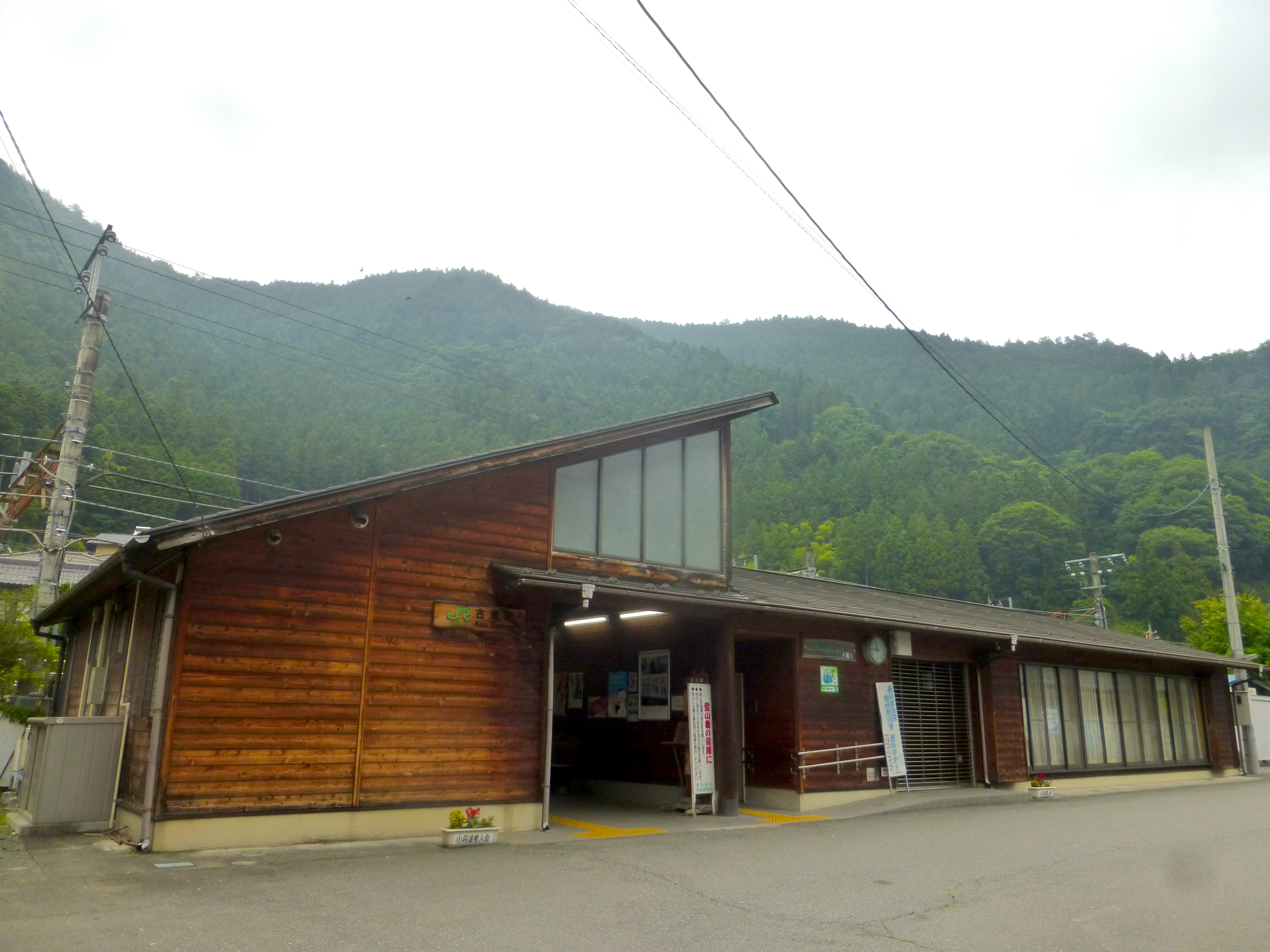
- Kori Station, June 2018

General information
- Location: 501 Kotamba, Okutama-machi, Nishitama-gun Tokyo 198-0105; Japan
- Coordinates: 35.8162°N 139.1515°E
- Operator: JR East
- Line: Ōme Line
- Distance: 31.6 km from Tachikawa
- Platforms: 2 side platforms

Other information
- Status: Unstaffed
- Station code: JC71
- Website: Official website

History
- Opened: 1 July 1944

Passengers
- FY2014: 255

Services
Preceding station	JR East	Following station
Hatonosu JC72 towards Oku-Tama	Ōme Line Rapid Local	Kawai JC70 towards Tachikawa
Location
- Location within Tokyo Location within Japan

Kori Station (古里駅, Kori-eki) is a passenger railway station in the town of Okutama, Tokyo, Japan, operated by the East Japan Railway Company (JR East).

== Lines ==
Kori Station is served by the Ōme Line, located 31.6 kilometers from the terminus of the line at Tachikawa Station.

== Station layout ==
The station consists of two side platforms serving two tracks. The station can accommodate trains up to 6-car lengths. The station is unattended.

=== Platforms ===
1	Ōme Line	for Okutama
2	Ōme Line	for Ōme, Tachikawa, Shinjuku, and Tokyo

== History ==
The station opened on 1 July 1944. With the privatization of Japanese National Railways (JNR) on 1 April 1987, the station came under the control of JR East.

== Passenger statistics ==
In fiscal 2014, the station was used by an average of 683 passengers daily (boarding passengers only).

The passenger figures for previous years are as shown below.

Fiscal year	Daily average
2005	335
2010	293

== See also ==
- List of railway stations in Japan
