= Ozaku Station =

Railway station in Hamura, Tokyo, Japan

JC59 Ozaku Station 小作駅
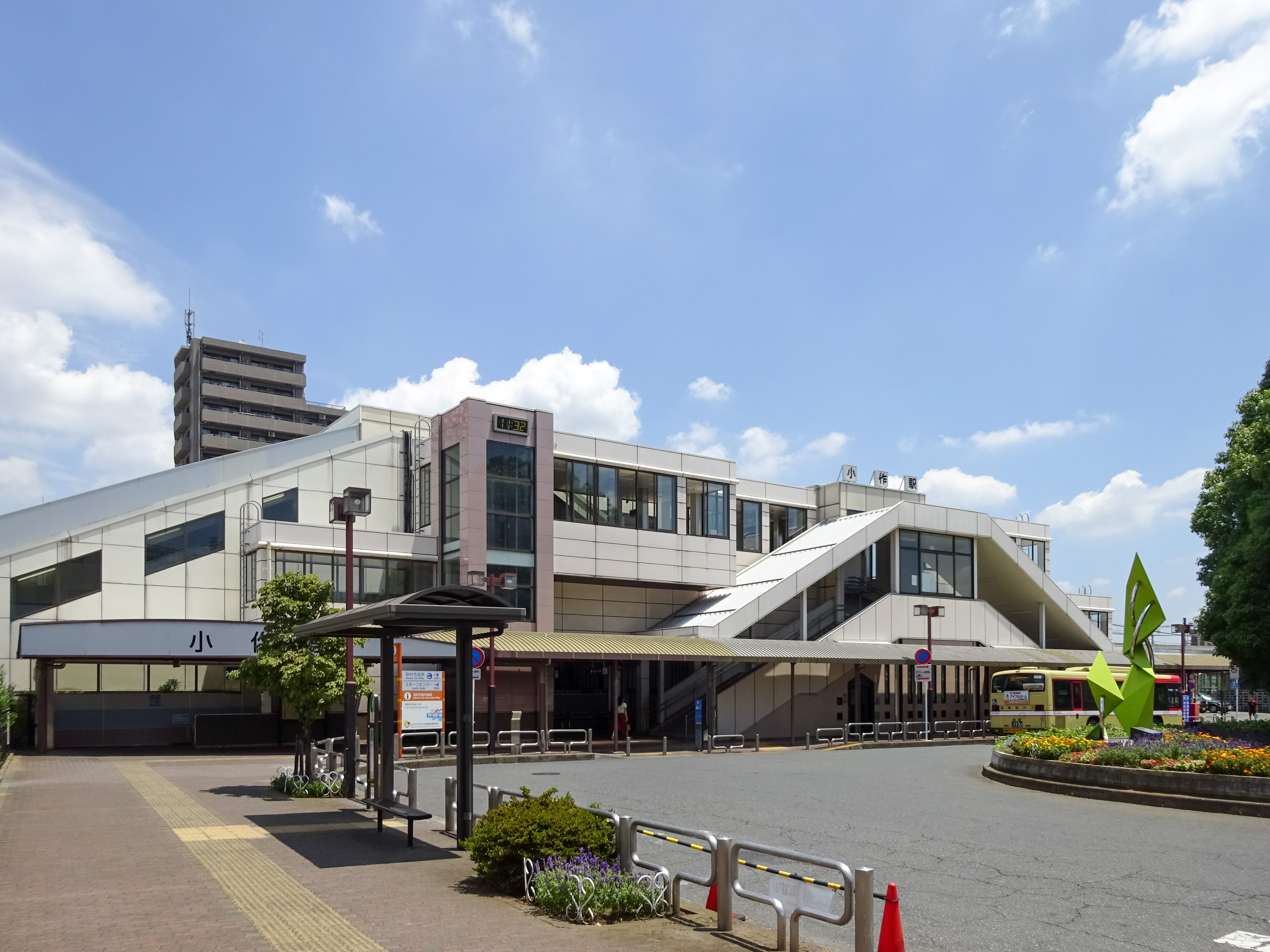
- Ozaku Station west exit in July 2017

General information
- Location: 5-35-1 Ozakudai, Hamura-shi, Tokyo 205-0001; Japan
- Coordinates: 35°46′34.6872″N 139°18′6.94″E
- Operator: JR East
- Line: Ōme Line
- Distance: 14.1 from Tachikawa
- Platforms: 2 side platforms
- Tracks: 2

Other information
- Status: Staffed
- Website: Official website

History
- Opened: 19 November 1894

Passengers
- FY2019: 16,111

Services
Preceding station	JR East	Following station
Kabe One-way operation	Ōme Line Commuter Special Rapid	Hamura JC58 towards Tachikawa
Kabe JC60 towards Ōme	Ōme Line Ōme Special Rapid	Hamura JC58 towards Tachikawa
Kabe JC60 towards Ōme	Ōme Line Commuter Rapid	Hamura One-way operation
Kabe JC60 towards Oku-Tama	Ōme Line Rapid Local	Hamura JC58 towards Tachikawa
Location
- Location within Tokyo Location within Japan

Ozaku Station (小作駅, Ozaku-eki) is a passenger railway station situated in the city of Hamura, Tokyo, Japan, operated by the East Japan Railway Company (JR East).

== Lines ==
Ozaku Station is served by the Ōme Line, and is located 14.1 kilometers from the starting point of the line at Tachikawa Station.

== Station layout ==
This station consists of a two opposed ground-level side platforms serving two tracks, with an elevated station building above the tracks and then the platforms. The station is staffed.

=== Platforms ===
1	Ōme Line	for Tachikawa, Shinjuku, and Tokyo
2	Ōme Line	for Ōme and Okutama

== History ==
The station was first opened on 19 November 1894. With the privatization of Japanese National Railways (JNR) on 1 April 1987, the station came under the control of JR East. A new station building was completed in March 1993.

== Passenger statistics ==
In fiscal 2019, the station was used by an average of 16,111 passengers daily (boarding passengers only).

The passenger figures for previous years are as shown below.

Fiscal year	Daily average
2005	18,070
2010	17,451
2015	17,408

== Surrounding area ==
- Musashino Park

== See also ==
- List of railway stations in Japan
