= Shiromaru Station =

Railway station in Okutama, Tokyo, Japan

JC73 Shiromaru Station 白丸駅
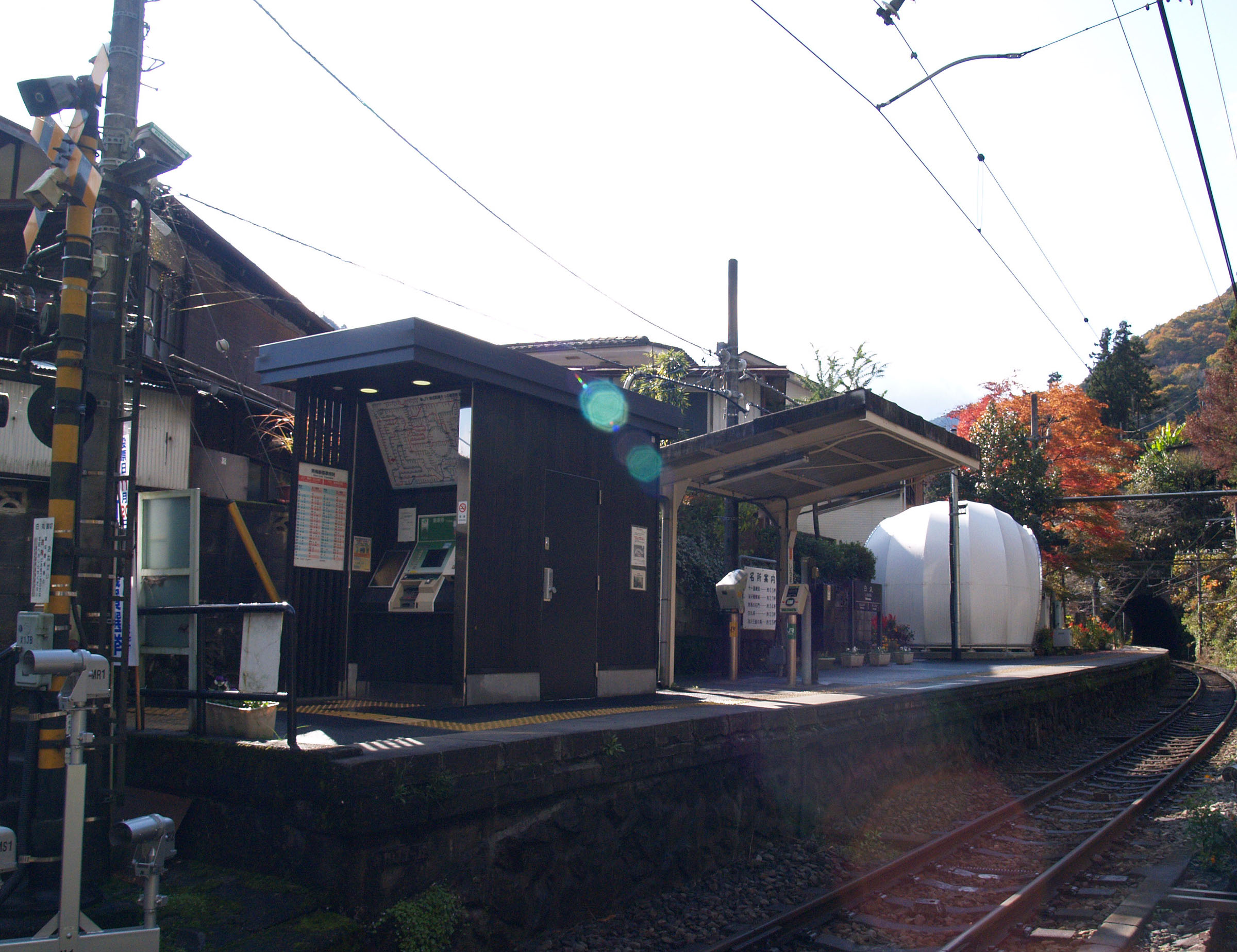
- Shiromaru Station, November 2011

General information
- Location: 62 Shiromaru, Okutama-machi, Nishitama-gun, Tokyo 198-0107; Japan
- Coordinates: 35.8116°N 139.1147°E
- Operator: JR East
- Line: Ōme Line
- Distance: 35.2 km from Tachikawa
- Platforms: 1 side platform

Other information
- Status: Staffed
- Station code: JC73
- Website: Official website

History
- Opened: 1 July 1944

Passengers
- FY2010: 74

Services
Preceding station	JR East	Following station
Oku-Tama JC74 Terminus	Ōme Line Rapid Local	Hatonosu JC72 towards Tachikawa
Location
- Location within Tokyo Location within Japan

Shiromaru Station (白丸駅, Shiromaru-eki) is a passenger railway station in the town of Okutama, Tokyo, Japan, operated by the East Japan Railway Company (JR East).

== Lines ==
Shiromaru Station is served by the Ōme Line, located 35.2 kilometers from the terminus of the line at Tachikawa Station.

== Station layout ==
The station has one side platform serving one bi-directional track. This platform can only accommodate trains for 4-car length. The station is unattended.

=== Platform ===
/	Ōme Line	for Okutama for Ōme, Tachikawa, Shinjuku, and Tokyo

== History ==
The station opened on 1 July 1944. It became part of the East Japan Railway Company (JR East) with the breakup of the Japanese National Railways on 1 April 1987.

== Passenger statistics ==
In fiscal 2010, the station was used by an average of 74 passengers daily (boarding passengers only).

== Surrounding area ==
- National Route 246
- Tama River
- Shiromaru Dam

== See also ==
- List of railway stations in Japan
