= Okutama, Tokyo =

Okutama 奥多摩町
- Town
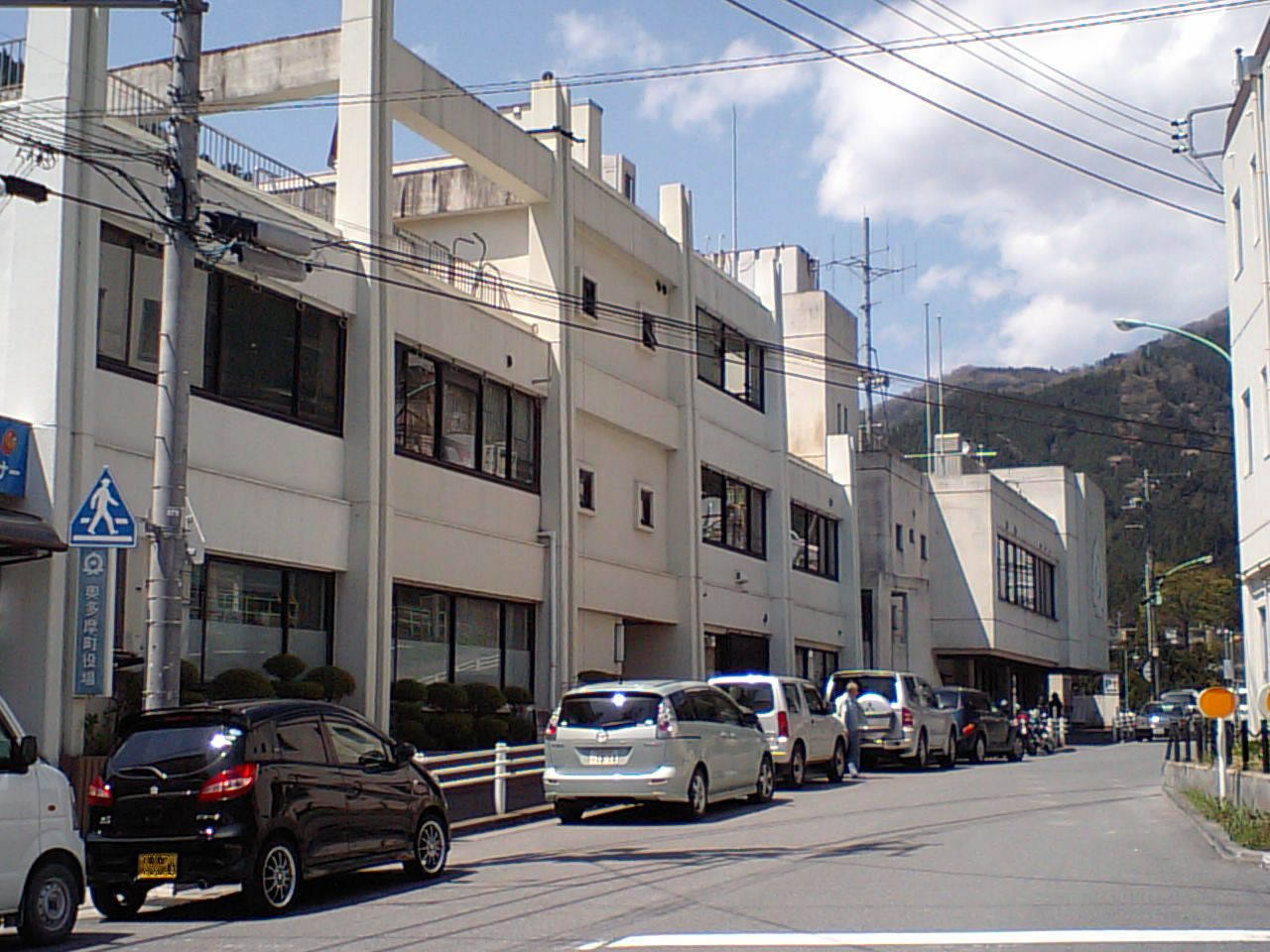
- Okutama Town Hall

- Flag Seal

- Location of Okutama in Tokyo

- Okutama (Tokyo)
- Coordinates: 35°48′34.4″N 139°5′46.3″E
- Country: Japan
- Region: Kantō
- Prefecture: Tokyo
- District: Nishitama
- First official recorded: 1st century AD (official)
- Hikawa town settled: February 11, 1940
- Current name was changed: April 1, 1955

Government
  - Mayor: Nobumasa Morooka (from May 2020)

Area
  - Total: 225.53 km^{2} (87.08 sq mi)

Population (April 2021)
  - Total: 4,949
  - Density: 21.94/km^{2} (56.83/sq mi)
- Time zone: UTC+9 (Japan Standard Time)
- Phone number: 042-557-0501
- Address: 215-6 Hikawa, Okutama-machi, Nishitama-gun, Tokyo 198-0212
- Climate: Cfa
- Website: Official website
- Symbols
- Bird: Copper pheasant
- Flower: Azalea
- Tree: Cryptomeria

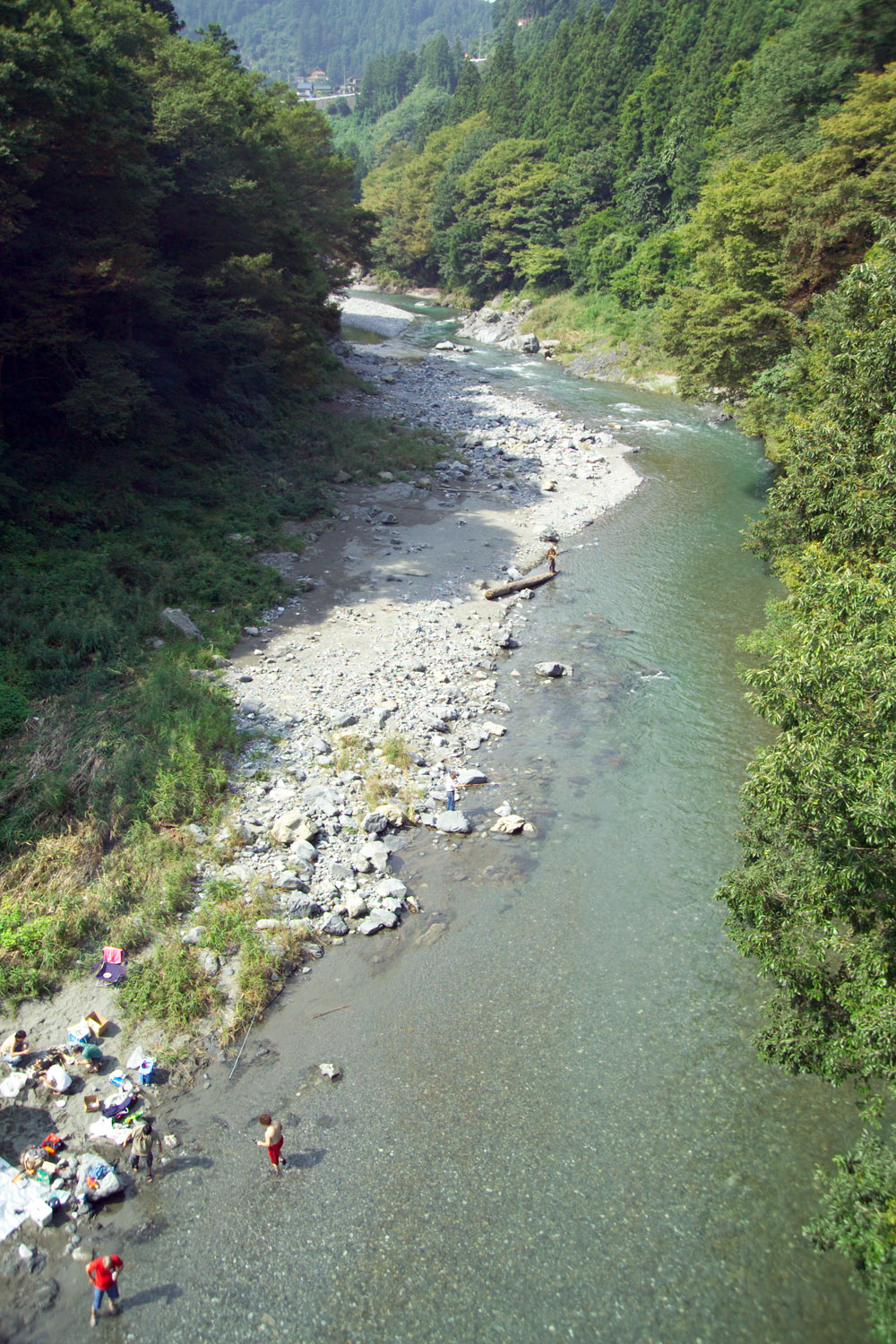
Fishing is popular in Okutama.

Okutama (奥多摩町, Oku-Tama-machi) is a town located in the western portion of Tokyo Metropolis, Japan, at a distance of roughly 60 kilometres (37 mi) west-northwest of Tokyo Imperial Palace. As of 1 April 2021, the town had an estimated population of 4,949, and a population density of 22 persons per km^{2}. The total area of the town is 225.53 square kilometres (87.08 sq mi).

== Geography ==
Okutama is located in the Okutama Mountains of far western Tokyo. It is geographically the largest municipality in Tokyo. Mount Kumotori, Tokyo's highest peak at 2017 m, divides Okutama from the Okuchichibu region of the neighboring Saitama and Yamanashi Prefectures. Tokyo's northernmost and westernmost points lie in Okutama, as does Lake Okutama, an important source of water for Tokyo, situated above the Ogōchi Dam in the town.

=== Mountains ===
- Mount Kumotori
  Mount Kumotori, at 2017 m is the highest mountain in Tokyo and the westernmost place of Tokyo. Many plants grow here during the summer, most notably the tsuga. From the summit, there is a clear view of Mount Fuji and the Okuchichibu Mountains.
- Mount Mitō
  Because it was forbidden to enter Mount Mitō during the Edo period, there are still many forests of enormous beech trees. Mount Fuji and Mount Kumotori can be seen from the summit, and it attracts many visitors especially during autumn. It is one of the Three Mountains of Okutama.
- Mount Odake (Tokyo)
  Mount Ōdake is one of the Three Mountains of Okutama. From the summit at 1266 m, Mount Fuji can be seen to the south and Mount Gozen to the west.
- Mount Kawanori
  From Mount Kawanori, all mountains in Okutama can be seen. Also, the Hyakuhiro Waterfall is located here.
- Mount Gozen
  Mount Gozen is well known for its oddly perfectly triangular shape. Like Mount Mitō, it attracts visitors in the fall.

=== Rivers ===
- Tama River
  The Tama River, with a length of 138 km, is the longest river in the prefecture. It flows through the entire prefecture, and the upstream of the river is located in Okutama.
- Hinohara River
  The Hinohara River is a rather short and small river located in the western portion of Tokyo.

=== Lakes ===
- Lake Okutama
- Lake Shiromaru
  Lake Shiromaru is a rather infamous dam on the Tama River. It has a height of 30.3 m, a length of 61 m, and a volume of 14,161 m^{3}.

=== Surrounding municipalities ===
Saitama Prefecture

- Chichibu
- Hannō

Tokyo Metropolis

- Akiruno
- Hinohara
- Ōme

Yamanashi Prefecture

- Kosuge
- Uenohara
- Tabayama

=== Climate ===
Okutama has a humid subtropical climate (Köppen Cfa) characterized by warm summers and cool winters with light to no snowfall. The average annual temperature in Okutama is 10.6 °C. The average annual rainfall is 2091 mm with September as the wettest month. The temperatures are highest on average in August, at around 22.1 °C, and lowest in January, at around minus 1.1 °C.

Climate data for Lake Okutama (1991−2020 normals, extremes 1976−present)
Month	Jan	Feb	Mar	Apr	May	Jun	Jul	Aug	Sep	Oct	Nov	Dec	Year
Record high °C (°F)	17.8 (64.0)	20.9 (69.6)	22.9 (73.2)	30.6 (87.1)	33.0 (91.4)	34.3 (93.7)	36.3 (97.3)	36.4 (97.5)	35.0 (95.0)	30.2 (86.4)	24.0 (75.2)	22.8 (73.0)	36.4 (97.5)
Mean daily maximum °C (°F)	6.8 (44.2)	7.6 (45.7)	10.9 (51.6)	16.5 (61.7)	21.1 (70.0)	23.4 (74.1)	27.4 (81.3)	28.5 (83.3)	24.3 (75.7)	18.8 (65.8)	14.0 (57.2)	9.3 (48.7)	17.4 (63.3)
Daily mean °C (°F)	1.5 (34.7)	2.2 (36.0)	5.5 (41.9)	10.8 (51.4)	15.6 (60.1)	18.9 (66.0)	22.6 (72.7)	23.5 (74.3)	19.8 (67.6)	14.3 (57.7)	8.8 (47.8)	3.9 (39.0)	12.3 (54.1)
Mean daily minimum °C (°F)	−2.4 (27.7)	−1.9 (28.6)	1.0 (33.8)	5.8 (42.4)	10.9 (51.6)	15.3 (59.5)	19.3 (66.7)	20.1 (68.2)	16.6 (61.9)	10.9 (51.6)	5.0 (41.0)	0.1 (32.2)	8.4 (47.1)
Record low °C (°F)	−9.3 (15.3)	−11.6 (11.1)	−8.1 (17.4)	−3.8 (25.2)	0.7 (33.3)	7.5 (45.5)	12.4 (54.3)	13.2 (55.8)	6.2 (43.2)	1.0 (33.8)	−2.1 (28.2)	−6.9 (19.6)	−11.6 (11.1)
Average precipitation mm (inches)	49.5 (1.95)	45.9 (1.81)	88.5 (3.48)	106.3 (4.19)	118.7 (4.67)	163.2 (6.43)	205.6 (8.09)	217.4 (8.56)	270.2 (10.64)	215.4 (8.48)	68.9 (2.71)	43.7 (1.72)	1,608 (63.31)
Average precipitation days (≥ 1.0 mm)	4.8	5.3	9.7	9.5	10.5	13.4	14.7	12.8	12.5	10.7	6.9	4.5	115.3
Mean monthly sunshine hours	206.5	187.7	173.0	178.4	172.2	104.2	124.8	144.6	104.5	128.7	164.5	186.5	1,874.6
Source: JMA

== Demographics ==
Per Japanese census data, the population of Okutama peaked around the year 1950 and has declined by more than two-thirds since then.

Historical population
Year	Pop.	±%
1920	9,514	—
1930	10,896	+14.5%
1940	12,543	+15.1%
1950	16,287	+29.8%
1960	13,785	−15.4%
1970	11,733	−14.9%
1980	9,808	−16.4%
1990	8,752	−10.8%
2000	7,575	−13.4%
2010	6,045	−20.2%
2020	4,750	−21.4%

== History ==
=== Prehistory ===
People began settling in Okutama from before the Jōmon Period and many archaeological sites have been found with ancient pottery. During the Yayoi period, rice cultivation began in the flatter lands of present-day Okutama, but most of the area remained covered by forests and only small flat lands existed.

=== Premodern period ===
During the Edo period, the area included in present-day Okutama was divided into 16 villages within Musashi Province. In each village, there was one person who served as the mayor, another who served as the leader of a particular group, and another who served as a representative for the farmers. Also, entering Mount Takanosu was forbidden for people of low rank during this time. This was because the people of high rank (government officials and such) hunted with hawks at the mountain, and the officials wanted to keep the hunting grounds for themselves.

=== Modern period ===
With the start of the Meiji period, the area of Okutama became part of Nirayama Prefecture except for Kotaba village, which was merged into Maebashi Domain, which then became part of Gunma Prefecture. While Kotaba village was turned into part of Maebashi city, the Okutama area was divided into three villages of Hikawa, Kori, and Ogouchi with the establishment of the modern municipalities system on April 1, 1889. In 1940, Hikawa was elevated to town status. In 1955, Hikawa town, Ogouchi village and Kori village were united, forming the town of Okutama.

=== Japan Airlines Flight 123 ===
On 12 August 1985 Japan Airlines Flight 123 suffered a catastrophic failure, losing a massive chunk of its vertical stabilizer. An anonymous person took a photo of the Boeing 747 six minutes before it crashed into a ridge on Mount Takamagahara. The photo clearly shows the vertical stabilizer to be mostly missing.

== Government ==
Okutama has a mayor-council form of government with a directly elected mayor and a unicameral town council of 12 members. Okutama, collectively with the municipalities of Akiruno, Fussa, Hamura, Hinode, Hinohara and Mizuho, contributes two members to the Tokyo Metropolitan Assembly. In terms of national politics, the city is part of Tokyo 25th district of the lower house of the Diet of Japan.

== Economy ==
Seasonal tourism, forestry and charcoal production are mainstays of the local economy.

== Education ==
Okutama has two public elementary schools and one public junior high school operated by the town government.

- Okutama Junior High School (奥多摩中学校)
- Hikawa Elementary School (氷川小学校)
- Kori Elementary School (古里小学校)

Okutama JHS was formed by the merger of Hikawa JHS (氷川中学校) and Kori JHS (古里中学校) in 2015.

The town does not have a high school.

== Transportation ==
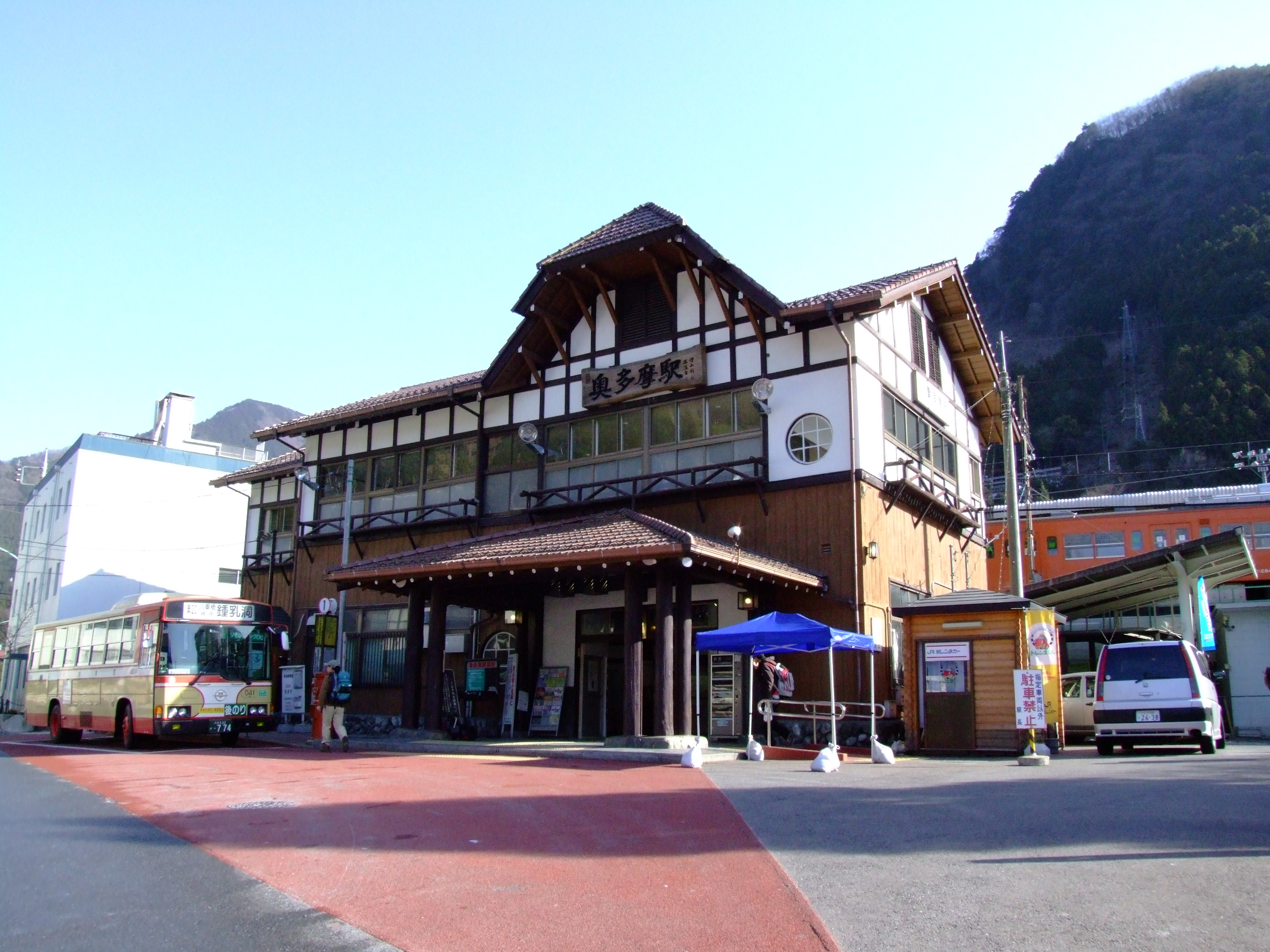
Oku-Tama Station

=== Railway ===
The East Japan Railway Company serves the town. The Ōme Line, which connects the town with Tachikawa, terminates at Oku-Tama Station.

JR East – Ōme Line

- Kawai - Kori - Hatonosu - Shiromaru - Oku-Tama

=== Bus ===
The Nishi Tokyo Bus Co. carries passengers to Lake Okutama, the Nippara Limestone Cave, Tabayama village and Kosuge village (both in Yamanashi Prefecture) from Oku-Tama Station.

=== Highway ===
- National Highways
  - National Route 139
  - National Route 411
- Prefectural Roads
  - Tokyo Prefectural Road 184 Okutama-Akiruno
  - Tokyo Prefectural Road 204 Nippara Limestone Cave
  - Tokyo Prefectural Road 205
  - Tokyo Prefectural Road 206 Kawano-Kamikawa

== Sister city relations ==
- Chun'an, Zhejiang, China

== Local attractions ==
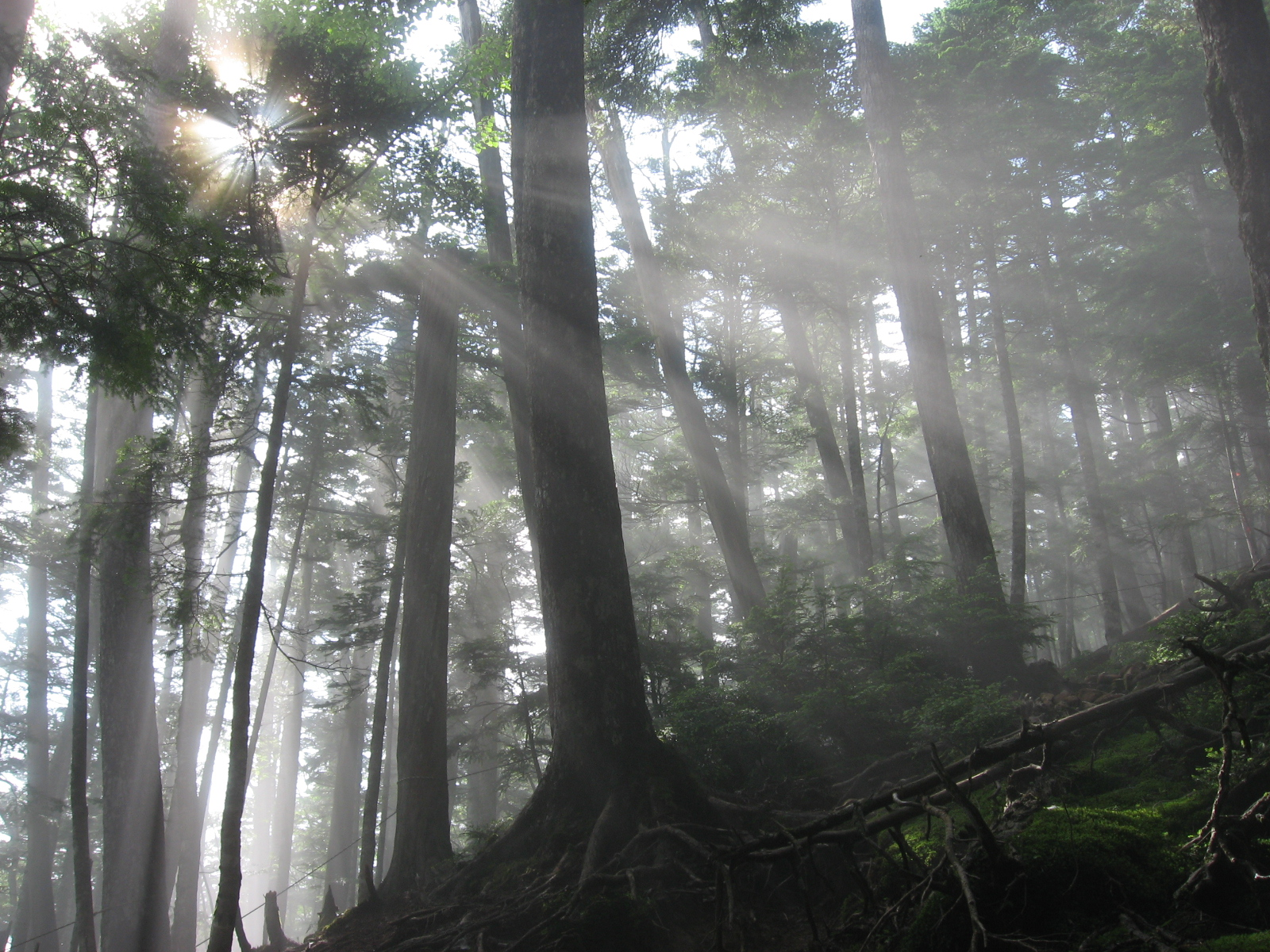
A forest in the Okuchichibu Mountains

All of the town is located in Chichibu Tama Kai National Park.

- Lake Okutama
  Lake Okutama plays a major role in providing drinking water for the people of Tokyo. The largest lake in Tokyo, it also has a large dam.
- Mount Takanosu
  During the Edo Period, the people of low rank were forbidden to enter Mount Takanosu, because it was a hawk hunting ground for the government and military officials. Now, it is open to hikers, and has an elevation of 1736.6 m.
- Tsurunoyu Onsen
  Until the construction of Ogouchi Dam, there was a spa town for Tsurunoyu Onsen. (It is now in the depths of the dam.) Now, there are a few inns that use the hot water from the hot spring for their spas. The hot spring is located about 20 minutes by bus from Oku-Tama Station.
- Hyakuhiro Waterfall

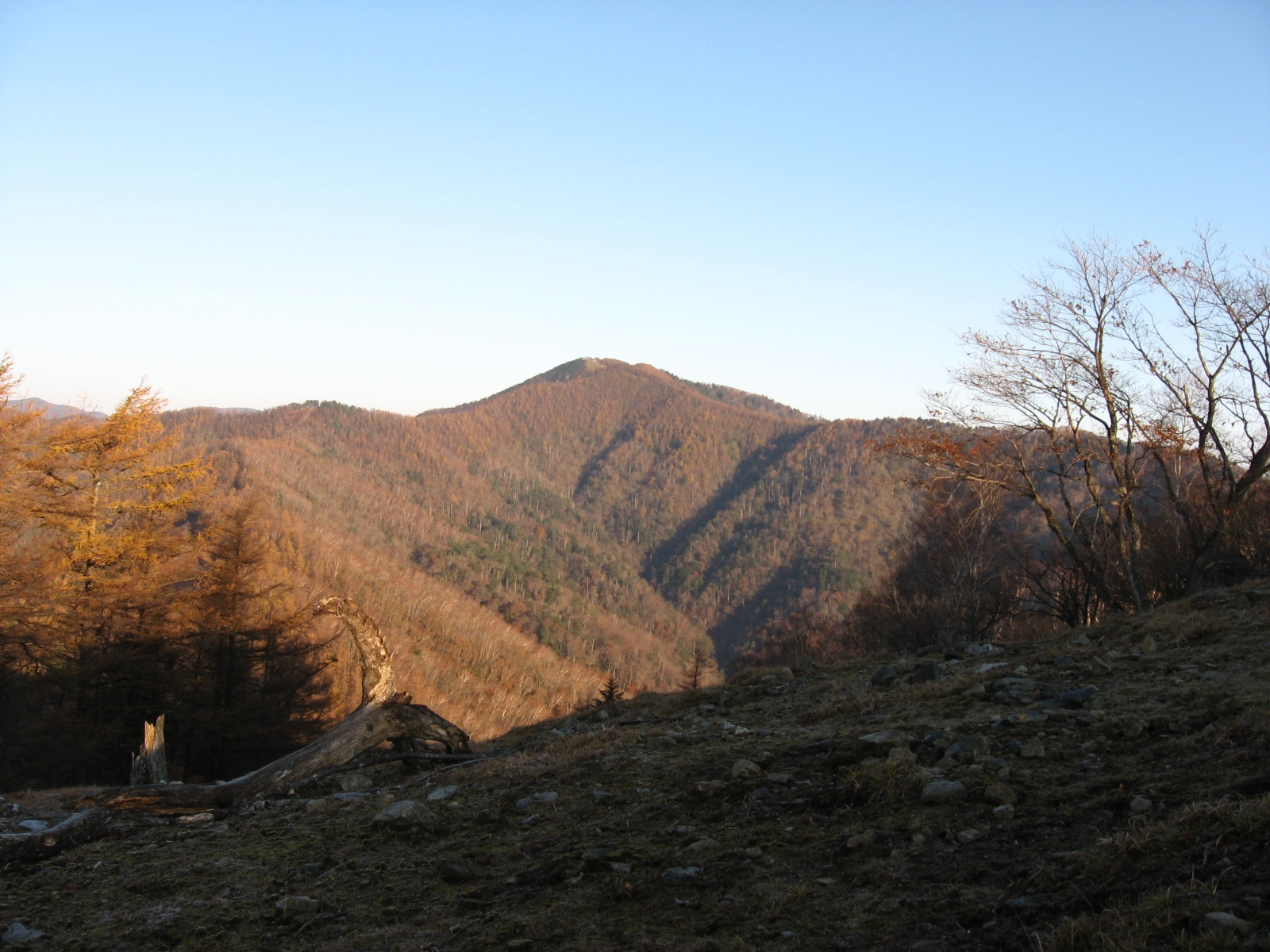
View of Mount Kumotori from Mount Nanatsuishi

- Hyakuhiro Waterfall, with a height of 40 m, is a famous waterfall in the Okutama area. Located in Mount Kawanori, it is part of the Nippara River.
- Nippara Cave
  Nippara Cave is the second largest limestone cave in the Kantō region after the Fujido Cave in Gunma Prefecture, and attracts many visitors from around Japan.
- Okuchichibu Mountains
  The Okuchichibu Mountains stretch from Nagano's Nobeyama region to Okutama and a portion of Saitama Prefecture and Yamanashi Prefecture. The highest mountain is Mount Kurogane (Yamanashi Prefecture), at 2232 m, and the lowest is Mount Azumaya (Saitama Prefecture), at 772 m.
- Okutama Onsen
  Okutama Onsen is a hot spring located in the town.
