= Hamura, Tokyo =

Hamura 羽村市
- City
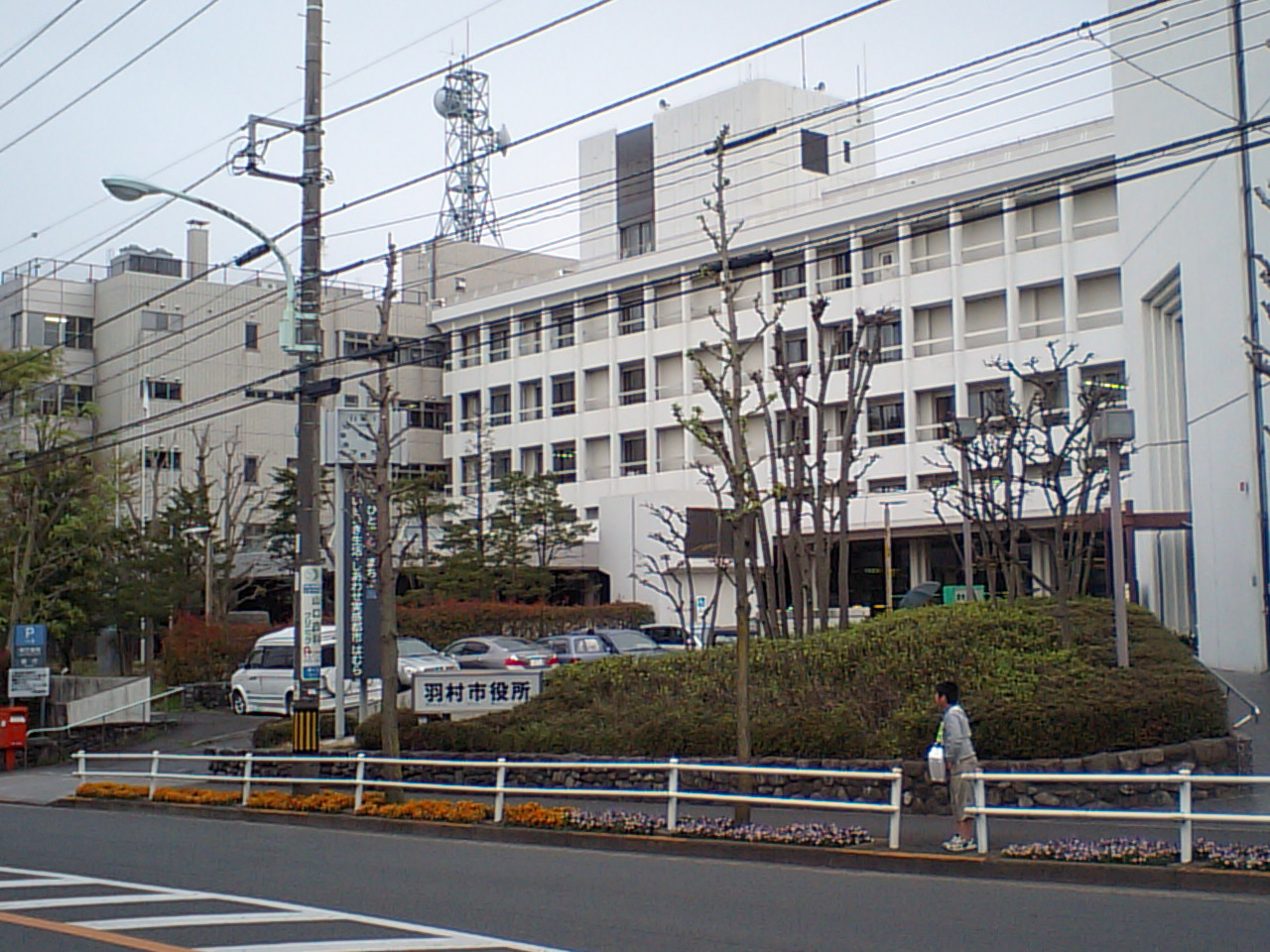
- Hamura City Hall

- Flag Seal

- Location of Hamura in Tokyo Prefecture

- Coordinates: 35°46′1.8″N 139°18′39.4″E
- Country: Japan
- Region: Kantō
- Prefecture: Tokyo

Area
  - Total: 9.90 km^{2} (3.82 sq mi)

Population (October 1, 2020)
  - Total: 54,326
  - Density: 5,490/km^{2} (14,200/sq mi)
- Time zone: UTC+9 (Japan Standard Time)
- City symbols
  - Tree: Ginkgo
  - Flower: Sakura
  - Bird: Brown hawk owl
- Phone number: 042-555-1111
- Address: 5-2-1 Midorigaoka, Hamura-shi, Tokyo-to 205-8601
- Website: Official website

Hamura (羽村市, Hamura-shi) is a city located in the western portion of the Tokyo Metropolis, Japan. As of 1 May 2010, the neighborhood had an estimated population of 57,174, and a population density of 5770 persons per km^{2}. The total area of the city was 9.90 square kilometres (3.82 sq mi).

== Geography ==
Hamura is approximately in the west-center of Tokyo Metropolis, on the Musashino Terrace. It flanks the Tama River about 50 kilometres (31 mi) upriver from the mouth.

Hamura is composed of the following neighborhoods: Fujimidaira, Futabacho, Gonokami, Hane, Hanehigashi, Kawasaki, Midorigaoka, Ozakudai, Shinmeidai, Tamagawa, Yokotakichinai.

=== Surrounding municipalities ===
Tokyo Metropolis

- Akiruno
- Fussa
- Mizuho
- Ōme

=== Climate ===
Hamura has a humid subtropical climate (Köppen Cfa) characterized by warm summers and cool winters with light to no snowfall. The average annual temperature in Hamura is 13.4 °C. The average annual rainfall is 1998 mm with September as the wettest month. The temperatures are highest on average in August, at around 25.0 °C, and lowest in January, at around 1.7 °C.

== Demographics ==
Per Japanese census data, the population of Hamura increased rapidly in the 1960s and 1970s, but has remained relatively steady in recent decades.

Historical population
Year	Pop.	±%
1920	5,113	—
1930	5,800	+13.4%
1940	5,878	+1.3%
1950	8,373	+42.4%
1960	11,003	+31.4%
1970	22,783	+107.1%
1980	42,017	+84.4%
1990	52,103	+24.0%
2000	56,013	+7.5%
2010	57,032	+1.8%
2020	54,326	−4.7%

== History ==
The area of present-day Hamura has been inhabited since Japanese Paleolithic times, and numerous remains from the Jōmon, Yayoi and Kofun periods have been discovered. During the Nara period, it became part of ancient Musashi Province. The Tamagawa Josui, an artificial waterway completed in 1653 to divert water from the Tama River and carry it as drinking water to Edo, begins in what is now part of Hamura.

In the post-Meiji Restoration cadastral reform of April 1, 1889, several hamlets (one of which was named Hane-mura) merged to form Nishitama Village in Nishitama District, at that time part of Kanagawa Prefecture. The entire district was transferred to the control of Tokyo Prefecture on April 1, 1893. In 1956, Nishitama Village became the town of Hamura. On November 1, 1991, Hamura was elevated to city status.

== Government ==
Hamura has a mayor-council form of government with a directly elected mayor and a unicameral city council of 18 members. Hamura, collectively with Fussa, Akiruno, Mizuho, Hinode, Hinohara, and Okutama contributes two members to the Tokyo Metropolitan Assembly. In terms of national politics, the city is part of Tokyo 25th district of the lower house of the Diet of Japan.

== Economy ==
Hamura is primary a regional commercial center, and a bedroom community for central Tokyo and neighbouring Ōme. Several electronic companies have light industrial or logistical facilities in Hamura. Hino Motors and Toyota have a plant and test track in the city.

== Education ==
Hamura has seven public elementary schools and three public middle schools operated by the city government. The city has one high school operated by the Tokyo Metropolitan Government Board of Education. There is also one special education school for the handicapped.

Public junior high schools:

- Hamura No. 1 (羽村第一中学校)
- Hamura No. 2 (羽村第二中学校)
- Hamura No. 3 (羽村第三中学校)

Public elementary schools:

- Fujimi (富士見小学校)
- Hamura Higashi (羽村東小学校)
- Hamura Nishi (羽村西小学校)
- Musashino (武蔵野小学校)
- Ozakudai (小作台小学校)
- Sakae (栄小学校)
- Shorin (松林小学校)

The United States Department of Defense Education Activity (DoDEA) operates the following schools on Yokota Air Base and in the municipality of Hamura for children of United States military personnel:

- Yokota West Elementary School

For secondary levels, U.S. military-dependent children are directed to Yokota Middle School and Yokota High School, both on base, but in Fussa instead of Hamura.

== Transportation ==
=== Railway ===
JR East – Ōme Line

- Hamura - Ozaku

=== Highway ===
- National Route 16

== Local attractions ==
- Aso Shrine
- Hamura Diversion Weir
- Hamura Zoo

== Notable people from Hamura ==
- Shinji Jojo, professional soccer player
- Shizuka Kudo, actress, singer
- Hiroomi Tosaka, singer and actor
