= Kawai Station (Tokyo) =

Railway station in Okutama, Tokyo, Japan

JC70 Kawai Station 川井駅
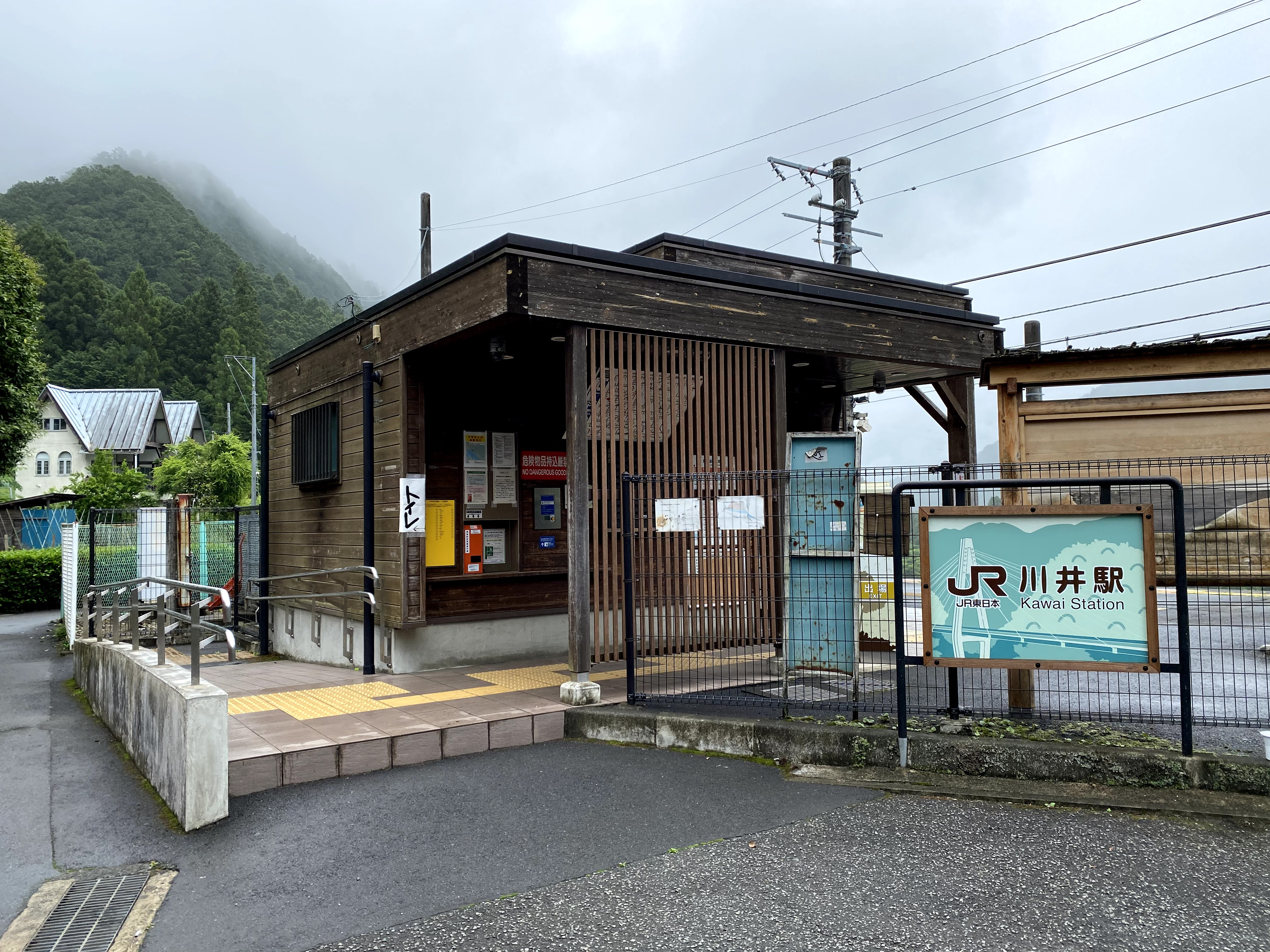
- Kawai Station building in May 2021

General information
- Location: 278 Kawai, Okutama-machi, Nishitama-gun, Tokyo 198-0102; Japan
- Coordinates: 35.8135°N 139.1645°E
- Operator: JR East
- Line: Ōme Line
- Distance: 30.0 km from Tachikawa
- Platforms: 1 side platform

Other information
- Status: Unstaffed
- Station code: JC70
- Website: Official website

History
- Opened: 1 July 1944

Passengers
- FY2010: 233

Services
Preceding station	JR East	Following station
Kori JC71 towards Oku-Tama	Ōme Line Rapid Local	Mitake JC69 towards Tachikawa
Location
- Location within Tokyo Location within Japan

Kawai Station (川井駅, Kawai-eki) is a passenger railway station in the town of Okutama, Tokyo, Japan, operated by the East Japan Railway Company (JR East).

== Lines ==
Kawai Station is served by the Ōme Line, located 30.0 kilometers from the terminus of the line at Tachikawa Station.

== Station layout ==
The station has one side platform, serving a single bi-directional track. The station is unattended.

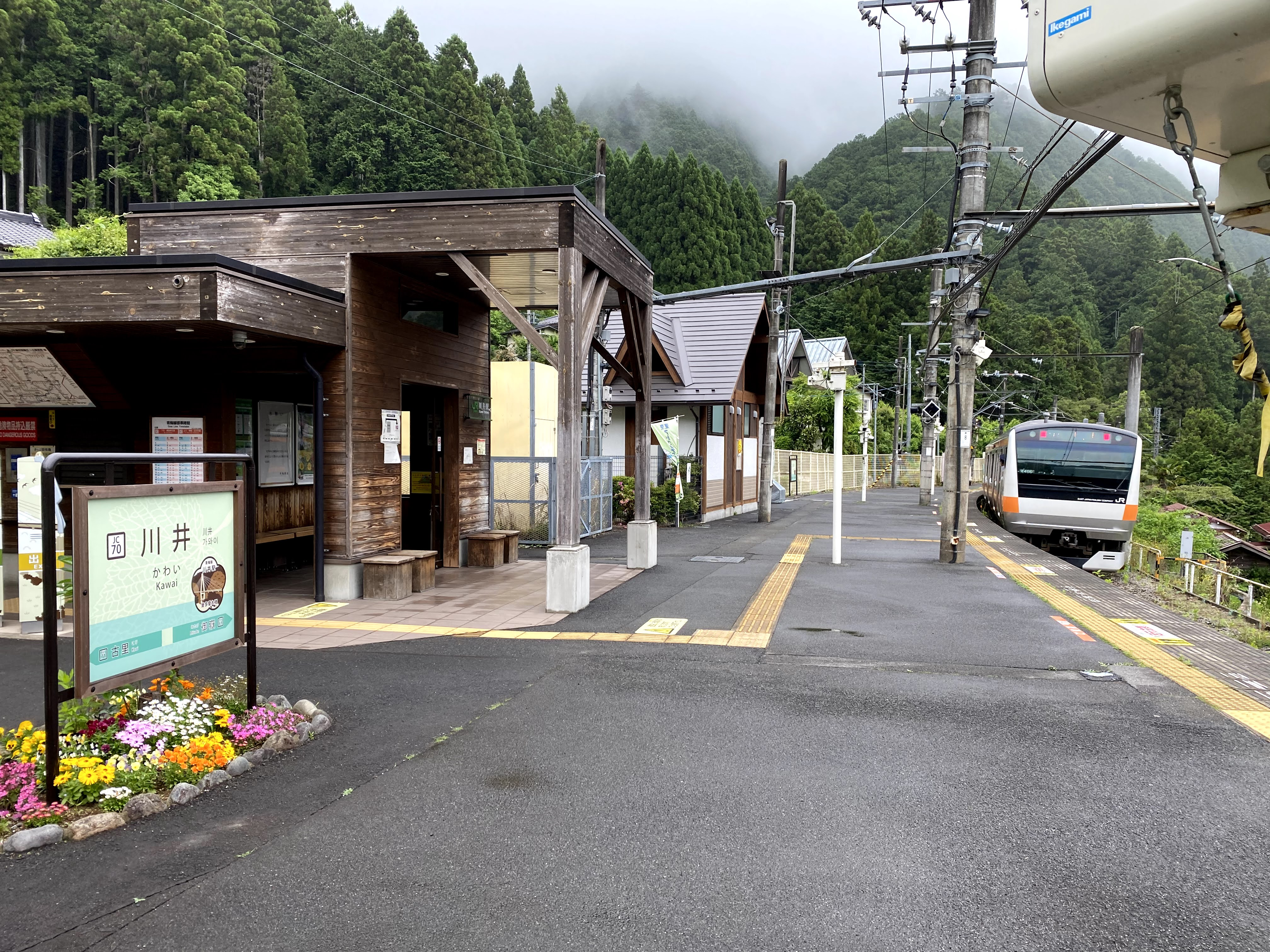
Station Platform in May 2021

=== Platform ===
/	Ōme Line	for Okutama for Ōme, Tachikawa, Shinjuku, and Tokyo

== History ==
The station opened on 1 July 1944. It became part of the East Japan Railway Company (JR East) with the breakup of the Japanese National Railways on 1 April 1987.

== Passenger statistics ==
In fiscal 2010, the station was used by an average of 233 passengers daily (boarding passengers only).

== Surrounding area ==
- National Route 411
- Tama River

== See also ==
- List of railway stations in Japan
