= Oku-Tama Station =

Railway station in Okutama, Tokyo, Japan

JC74 Oku-Tama Station 奥多摩駅
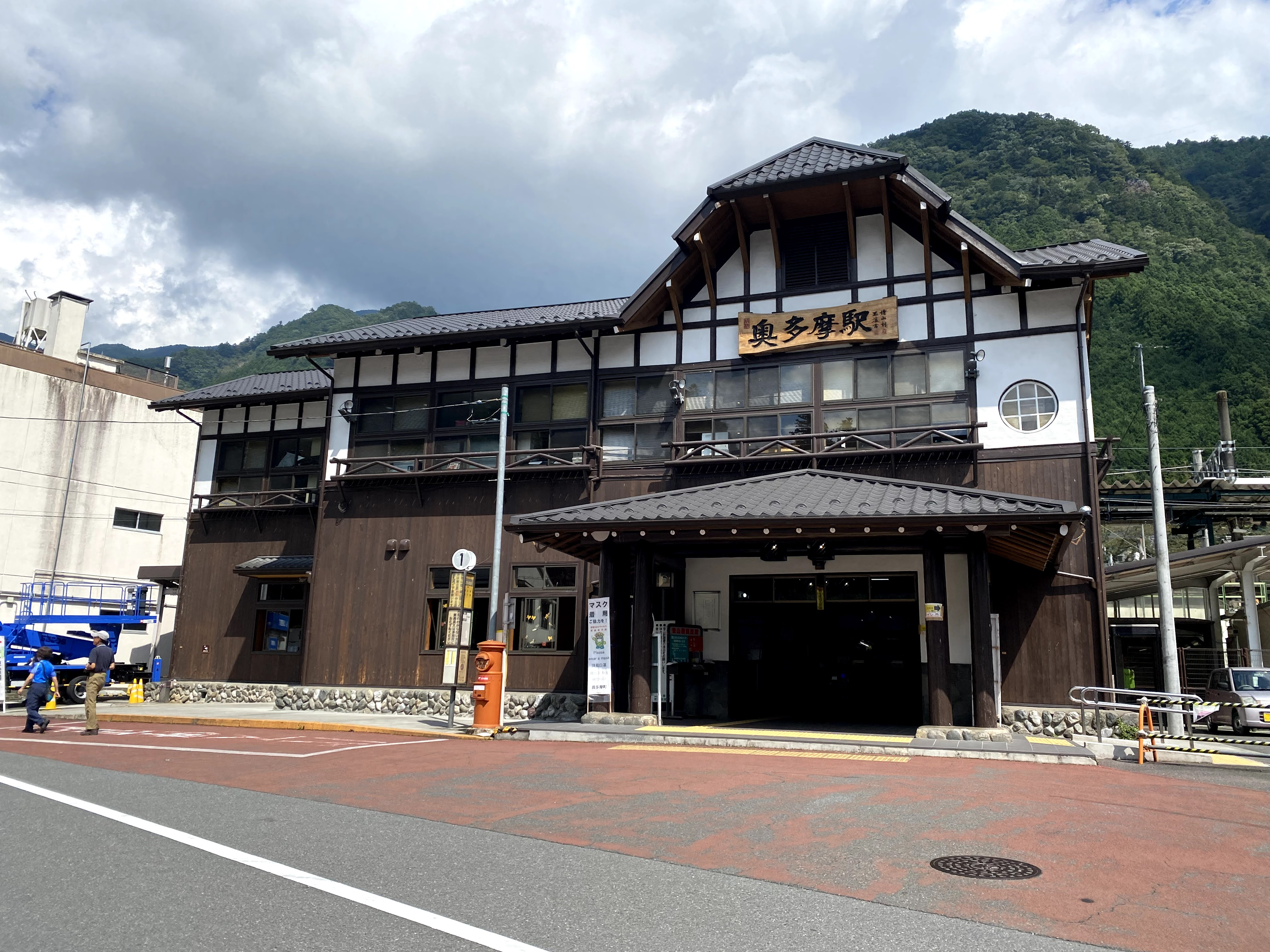
- Oku-Tama Station in September 2021

General information
- Location: 210 Hikawa, Okutama-machi, Nishitama-gun, Tokyo 198-0212; Japan
- Coordinates: 35°48′32.8572″N 139°5′47.81″E
- Operator: JR East
- Line: Ōme Line
- Distance: 37.2 km from Tachikawa
- Platforms: 1 island platform

Other information
- Status: Staffed
- Station code: JC74
- Website: Official website

History
- Opened: 1 July 1944
- Former names: Hikawa Station (until 1971)

Passengers
- FY2024: 1,788 (daily)

Services
Preceding station	JR East	Following station
Terminus	Ōme Line Rapid Local	Shiromaru JC73 towards Tachikawa
Location
- Location within Tokyo Location within Japan

Oku-Tama Station (奥多摩駅, Oku-Tama-eki) is a passenger railway station in the town of Okutama, Tokyo, Japan, operated by the East Japan Railway Company (JR East). It is the western-most station in the Tokyo Metropolis.

== Lines ==
Oku-Tama Station is the western terminus of the Ōme Line, located 37.2 kilometers from the starting point of the line at Tachikawa Station.

== Station layout ==
The station has one island platform serving two dead-headed tracks. The station is attended.

=== Platforms ===
1-2	Ōme Line	for Ōme, Tachikawa, Shinjuku, and Tokyo

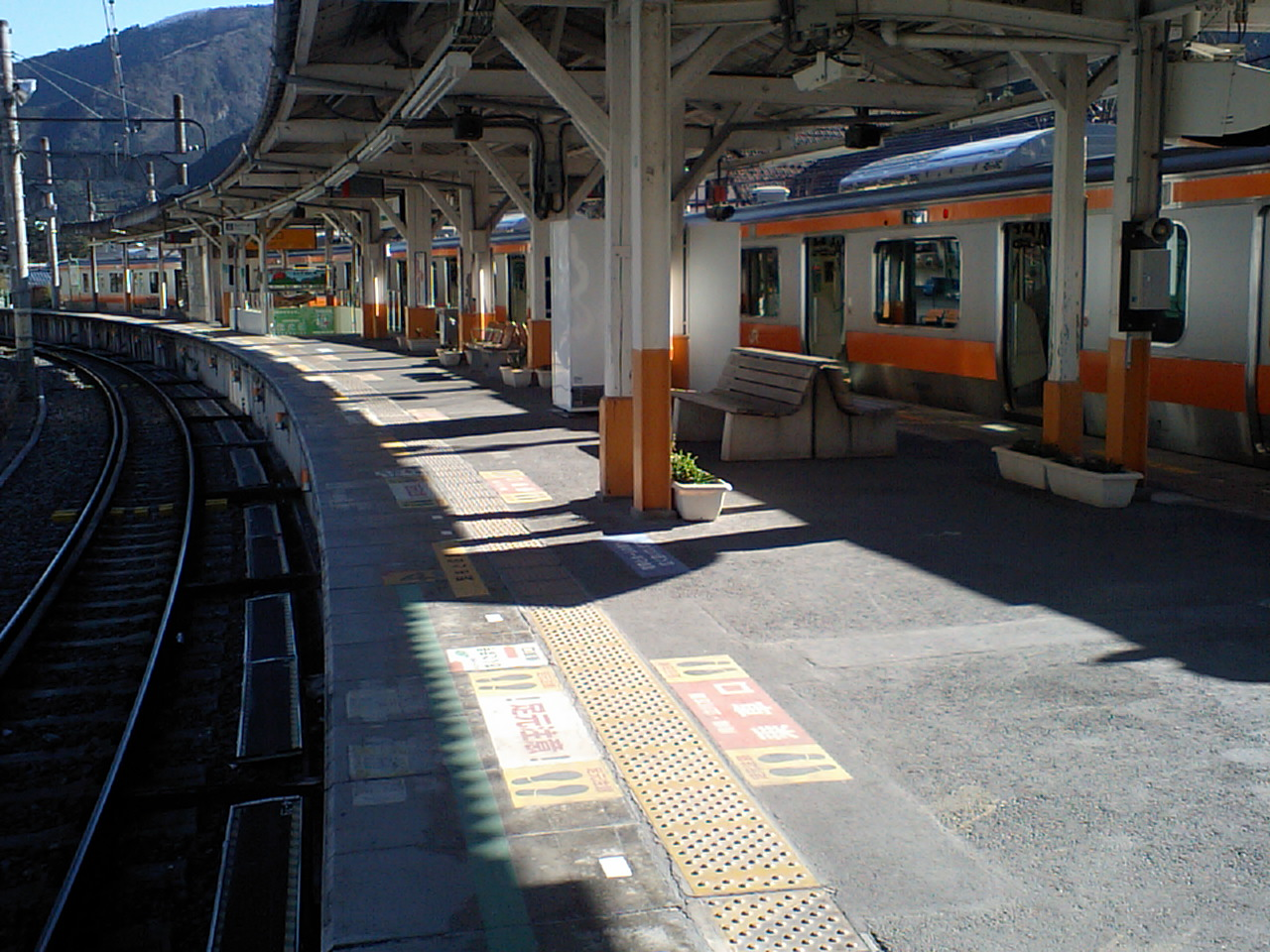
The curved island platform.

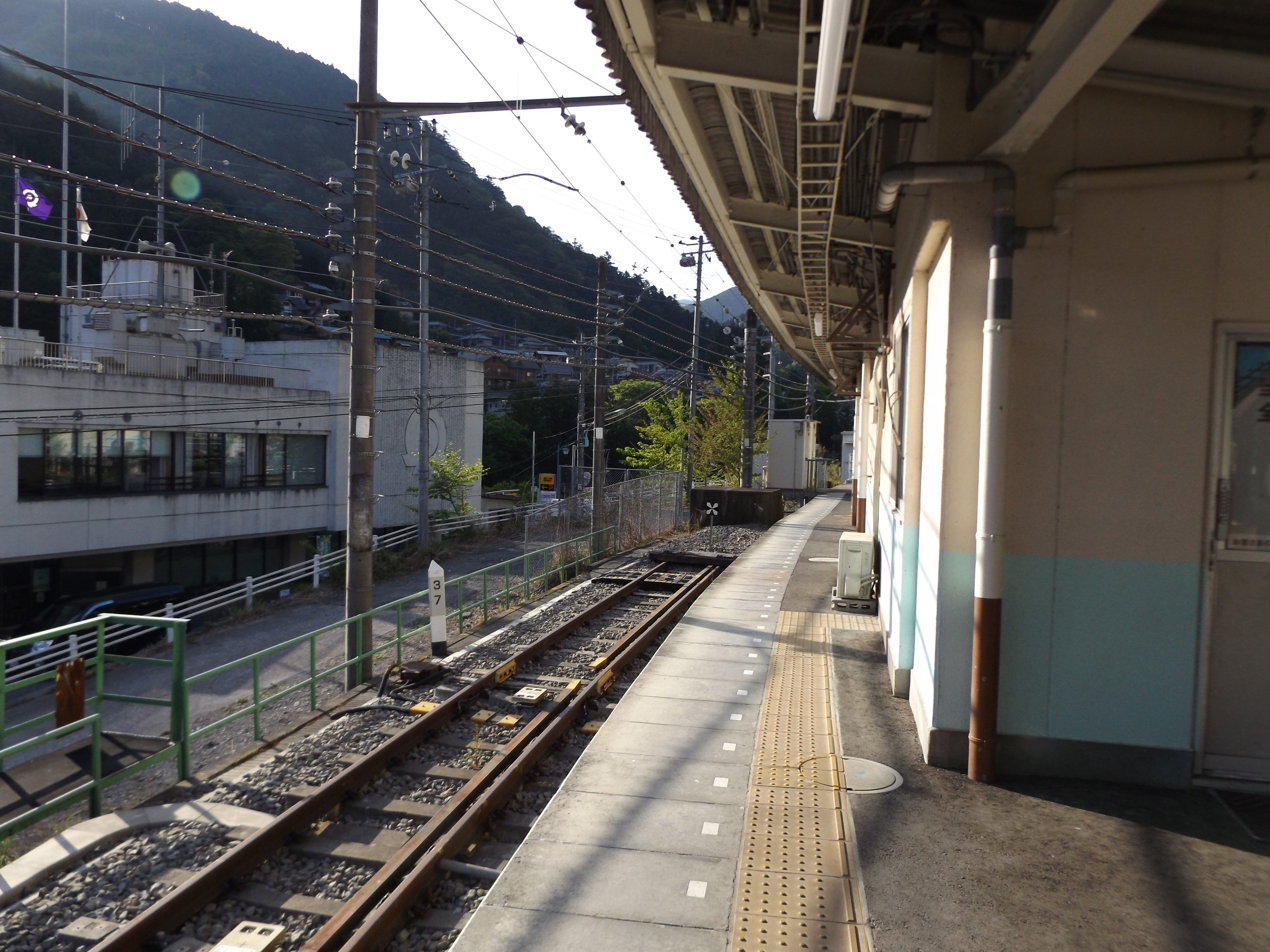
Dead end of track 1

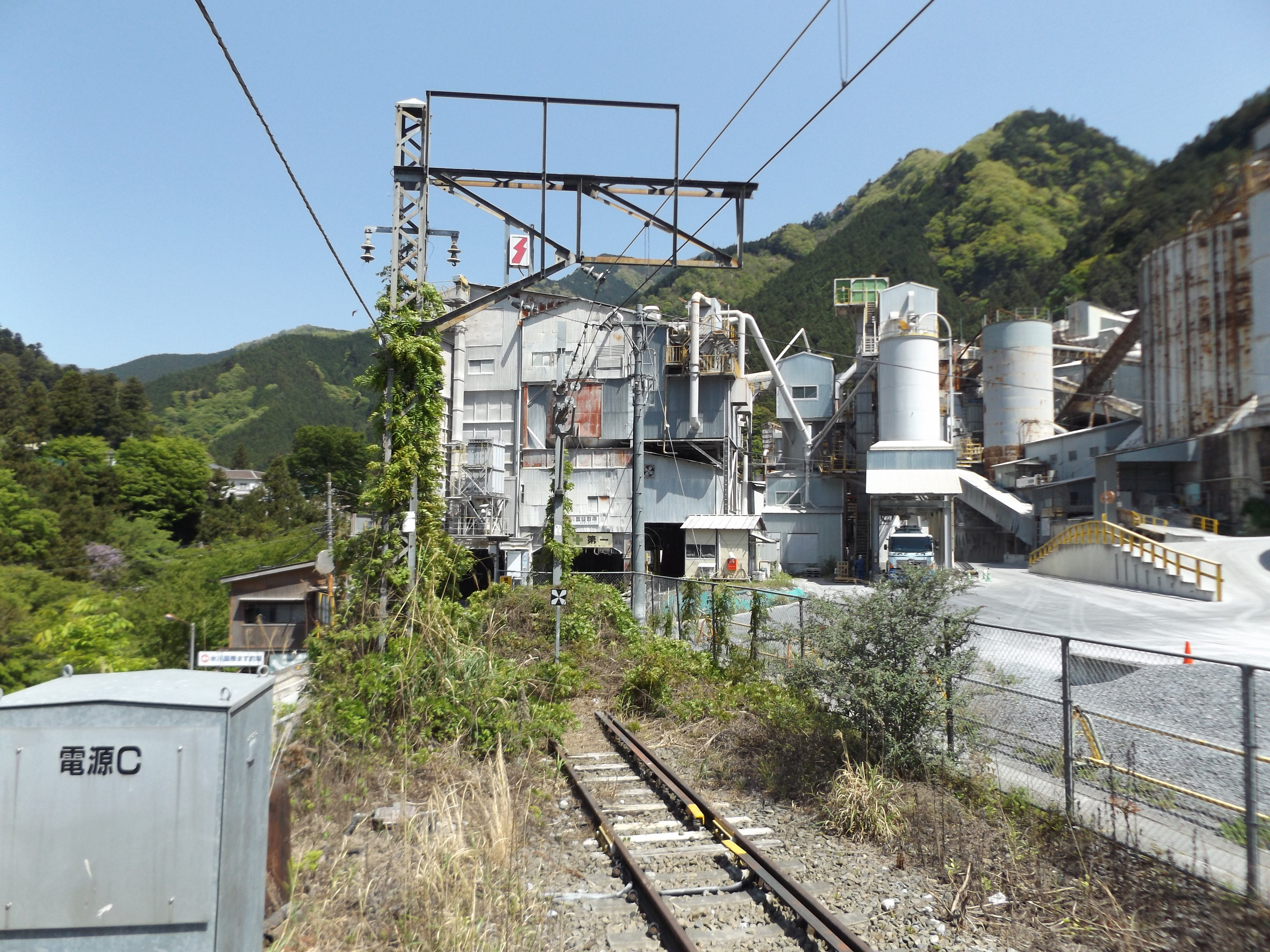
Dead end of track 2

Holiday Rapid Okutama trains and irregular trains are departed/arrived from/at Track 2. The departure melodies are Donguri Korokoro, and differ between Track 1 and 2.

== History ==
The station opened on 1 July 1944 as Hikawa Station (氷川駅). It was renamed Oku-Tama Station on 1 February 1971. It became part of the East Japan Railway Company (JR East) with the breakup of the Japanese National Railways (JNR) on 1 April 1987.

== Route buses ==
There are bus stops in Hikawa barn which Nishi Tokyo Bus has in the front of the station.

Bus stop	No	Via	Destination	Company	Note
1	[奥20]	Kawanori-bashi	Nippara Shōnyūdō	Nishi Tokyo Bus	Runs only on weekdays for Nippara Shōnyūdō
1	[奥21]	Kawanori-bashi	Higashi-Nippara	Nishi Tokyo Bus	
2	[奥09]	Lake Okutama・Mineya-bashi・Miyama-bashi	Kamozawa-nishi	Nishi Tokyo Bus	
2	[奥10]	Lake Okutama・Mineya-bashi・Miyama-bashi	Tabayama	Nishi Tokyo Bus	
2	[奥11]	Lake Okutama・Mineya-bashi・Miyama-bashi	Tozura	Nishi Tokyo Bus	
2	[奥12]	Lake Okutama・Mineya-bashi・Miyama-bashi	Kosuge-no-Yu	Nishi Tokyo Bus	
2	[奥12]	Lake Okutama・Mineya-bashi・Miyama-bashi・Mount Daibosatsu Higashiguchi	Kosuge-no-Yu	Nishi Tokyo Bus	
2	[奥14]	Lake Okutama・Mineya-bashi	Mineya	Nishi Tokyo Bus	
2	[奥15]	Umekubo・Sōdake	Lake Okutama	Nishi Tokyo Bus	
3番	[奥30]	Kamba・Shiromaru Station・Hatonosu Station・Kori Station・Kawai Station (Tokyo)	Kami-Hinata	Nishi Tokyo Bus	
3番	[奥31]	Kamba・Shiromaru Station・Hatonosu Station・Kori Station・Kawai Station (Tokyo)	Seitō-bashi	Nishi Tokyo Bus	
3番	[奥32] (circular-route)	Nagahata・Kamba・Moegi-no-Yu	Okutama Station	Nishi Tokyo Bus	

== Passenger statistics ==
During FY2023, the station was used on average by 1,740 passengers daily. In FY2024, the average increased to 1,788 daily. (Note: Data published by the Ministry of Land, Infrastructure, Transport and Tourism state the number of passengers boarding and disembarking by station in a given year. FY2024 covers the period from 1 April 2024 to 31 March 2025. Data published by individual railways directly may state the number boarding only.)

Fiscal Year	Daily Average
2024	1788
2023	1740
2022	1614
2021	1560
2020	1398
2019	1868
2018	1868
2017	1858
2016	1932
2015	1784
2014	1838
2013	1770
2012	1754
2011	1804

== Surrounding area ==
- Okutama Town Hall
- Tama River
- National Route 411

== See also ==
- List of railway stations in Japan
