= Hatonosu Station =

Railway station in Okutama, Tokyo, Japan

JC72 Hatonosu Station 鳩ノ巣駅
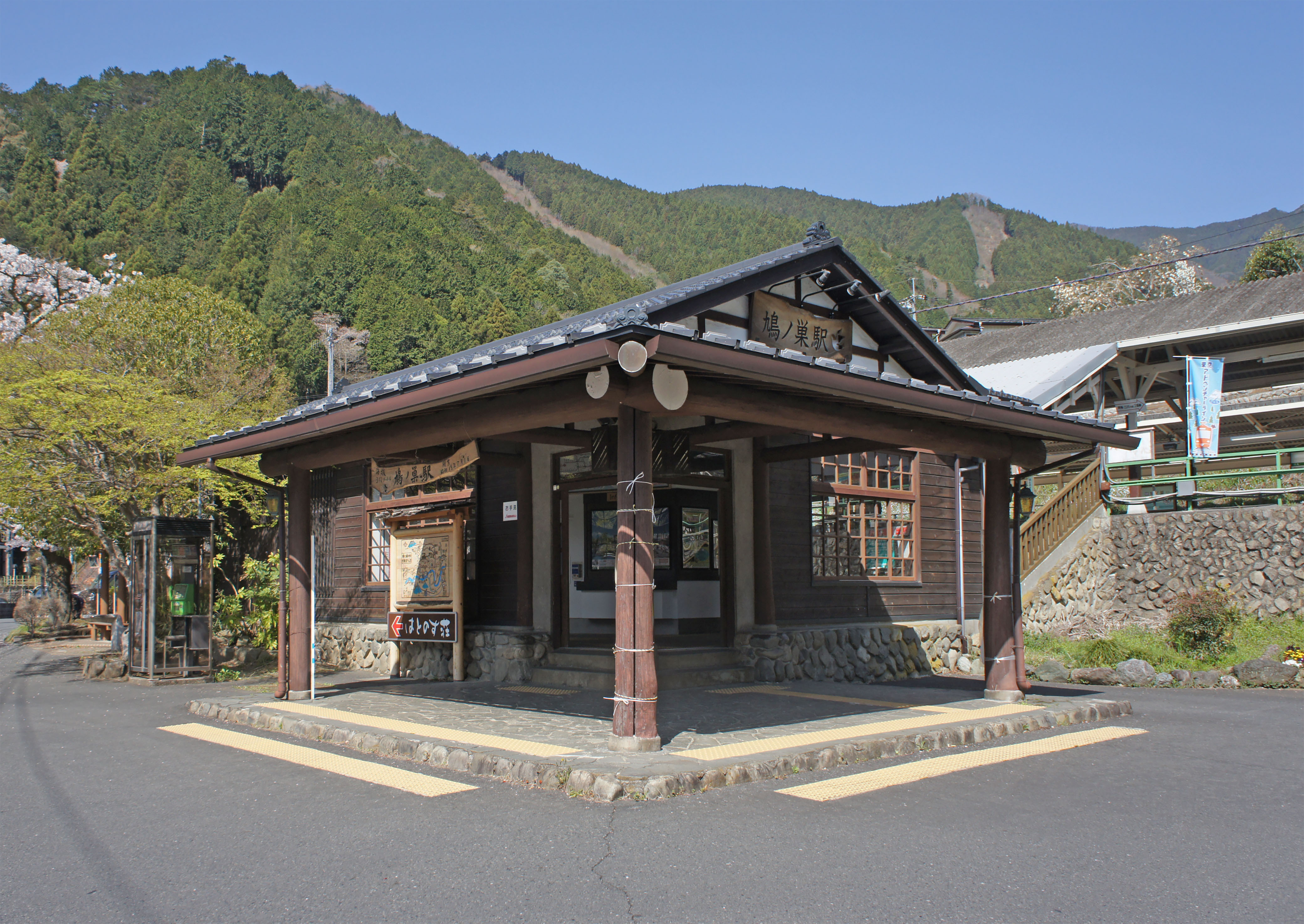
- Hatonosu Station, April 2022

General information
- Location: 390 Tanazawa, Okutama-machi, Nishitama-gun, Tokyo 198-0106; Japan
- Coordinates: 35.8149°N 139.1291°E
- Operator: JR East
- Line: Ōme Line
- Distance: 33.8 km from Tachikawa
- Platforms: 2 side platforms

Other information
- Status: Unstaffed
- Station code: JC72
- Website: Official website

History
- Opened: 1 July 1944

Passengers
- FY2014: 181

Services
Preceding station	JR East	Following station
Shiromaru JC73 towards Oku-Tama	Ōme Line Rapid Local	Kori JC71 towards Tachikawa
Location
- Location within Tokyo Location within Japan

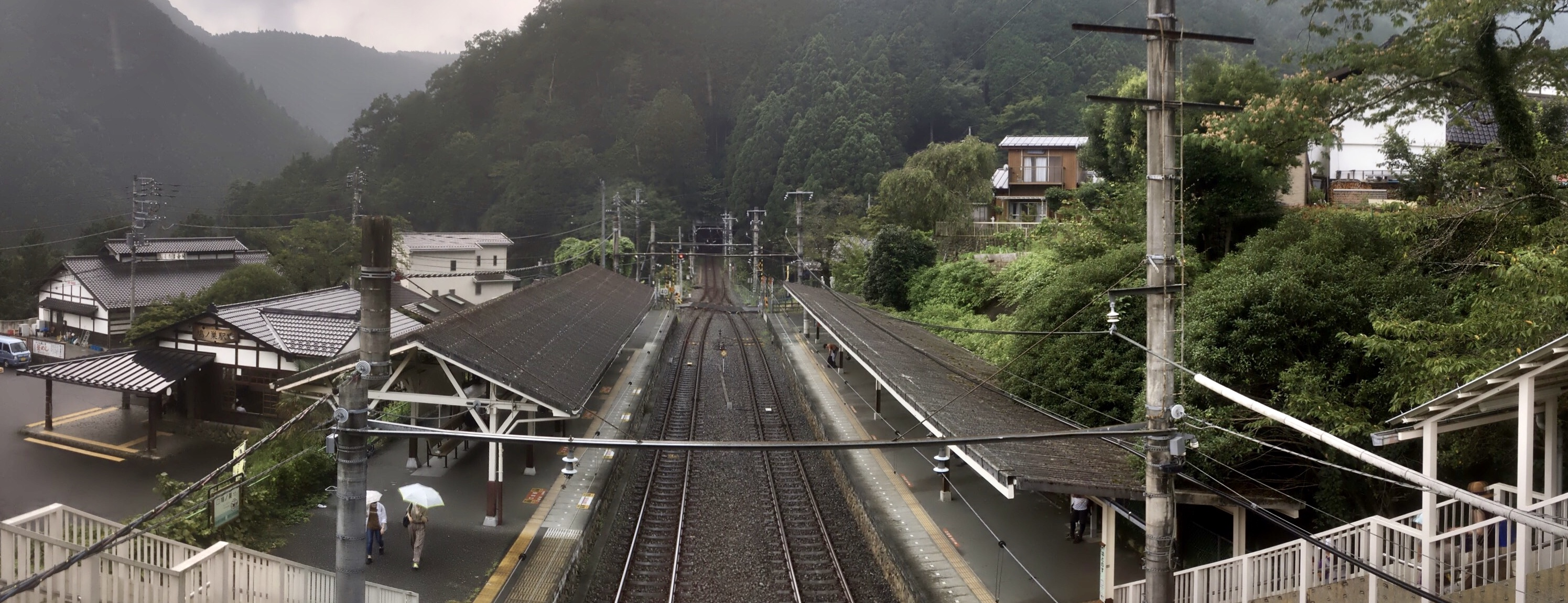
Hatonosu Station building (left) and the platforms, August 2020

Hatonosu Station (鳩ノ巣駅, Hatonosu-eki) is a passenger railway station in the town of Okutama, Tokyo, Japan, operated by the East Japan Railway Company (JR East).

== Lines ==
Hatonosu Station is served by the Ōme Line, located 33.8 kilometers from the terminus of the line at Tachikawa Station.

== Station layout ==
The station has two opposed side platforms serving two tracks. This station can only accommodate trains of 4-car lengths. The station is unattended.

=== Platforms ===
1	Ōme Line	for Okutama
2	Ōme Line	for Ōme, Tachikawa, Shinjuku, and Tokyo

== History ==
The station opened on 1 July 1944. It became part of the East Japan Railway Company (JR East) with the breakup of the Japanese National Railways on 1 April 1987.

== Passenger statistics ==
In fiscal 2014, the station was used by an average of 181 passengers daily (boarding passengers only).

The passenger figures for previous years are as shown below.

Fiscal year	Daily average
2005	235
2010	212

== Surrounding area ==
- National Route 411
- Shiromasu Dam
- Hatonosu Valley

== See also ==
- List of railway stations in Japan
