= Lake Okutama =

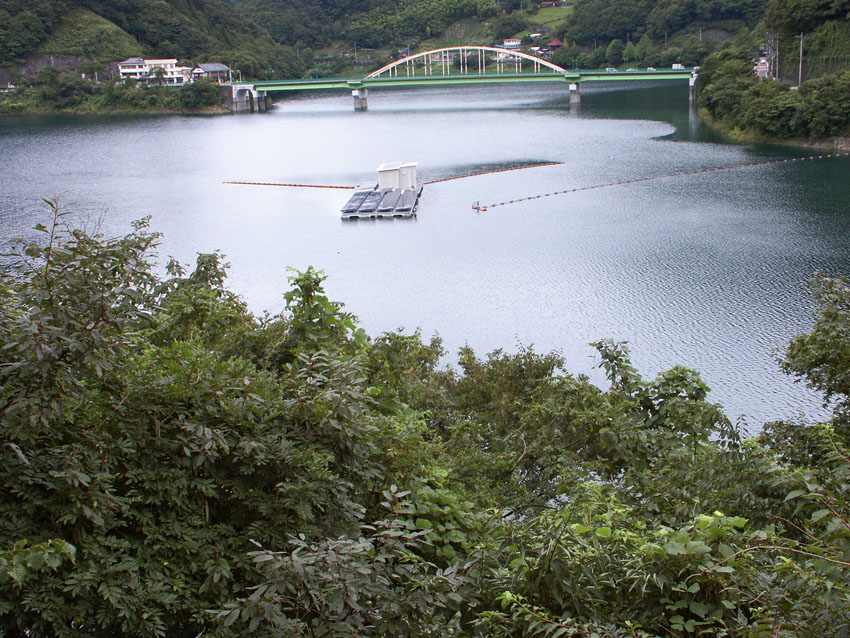

- Location within Japan
- Coordinates: 35°47′N 139°02′E
- Lake type: reservoir
- Primary inflows: Tama River, Kosuge River
- Primary outflows: Tama River
- Basin countries: Japan
- Surface area: 4.25 km^{2} (1.64 sq mi)
- Max. depth: 142 m (466 ft)
- Surface elevation: 526.5 m (1,727 ft)

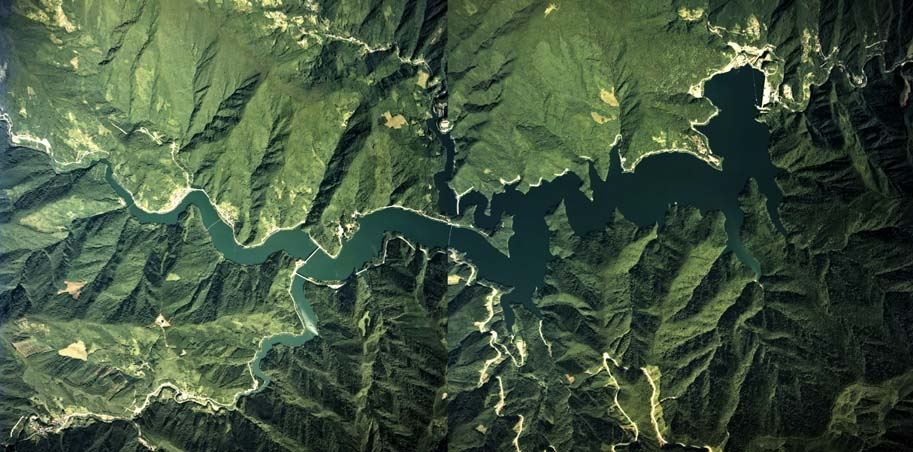
Aerial photo of Lake Okutama.

Lake Okutama (奥多摩湖, Okutama-ko) is in Tokyo and Yamanashi Prefectures in Japan. Lying above the Ogōchi Dam, it is also known as the Ogōchi Reservoir. Lake Okutama is an important source of drinking water for Tokyo.

== Description ==
The lake occupies part of the town of Okutama in Nishitama District, Tokyo and the village of Tabayama in Kitatsuru District, Yamanashi.

The Taba (Tama) River feeds Lake Okutama at its western end. From the southwest, the Kosuge River also flows into the lake. The Tama River drains the lake at the eastern end. The surroundings are famous for cherry blossoms in the spring.

=== Ogōchi Dam ===
- Dam height: 148 m
- Dam length: 353 m
- Greatest depth: 142 m
- Mean depth: 43.6 m
- Circumference when full: 45.37 km
- Altitude of surface when full: 526.5 m
- Area of surface when full: 4.25 km^{2}
- Capacity: 185,400,000 m^{3}
- Completion: 1957
- Displaced: 945 households
- Died during construction: 87 people
