= Mitake =

Mitake can refer to

Companies:

- Mitake Tozan Railway, a Japanese transport company in Ōme, Tokyo, Japan

Locations:

- Mitake Castle, a Sengoku period yamashiro-style Japanese castle
- Mitake, Gifu, a town located in Kani District, Gifu Prefecture, Japan
- Mitake, Nagano, a former village located in Kiso District, Nagano, Japan
- Mitake-juku, the forty-ninth of the sixty-nine stations of the Nakasendō
- Mitake, Shūnan, Yamaguchi, a small community within Shūnan, Yamaguchi Prefecture
- Mount Mitake (Tokyo), a mountain in Tokyo, Japan
- Mount Mitake (Hyōgo), a mountain located about 50 km (31 mi) north of Kobe in Hyōgo Prefecture, Japan

Transportation:

- Mitake Station (Gifu), a train station on the Meitetsu Hiromi Line in Mitake, Gifu Prefecture, Japan
- Mitake Station (Tokyo), a train station on the Ōme Line in Tokyo, Japan

== People ==
- Akira Mitake (見岳 章; born 1956), Japanese composer
- Kazuya Mitake (御嶽 和也; born 1951), Japanese former volleyball player

== Fictional characters ==
- Ran Mitake (美竹 蘭), a character in the media franchise BanG Dream!

== Recreation ==
- Mitake rock climbing, a bouldering area near Mitake station, Tokyo, Japan

== See also ==
- 2924 Mitake-mura, a main belt asteroid discovered in 1977 by Hiroki Kosai and Kiichiro Hurukawa
- Grifola frondosa, also known as maitake, which is often misspelled mitake
- Ran Mitake, a character from the series BanG Dream!
