= Mount Odake (Tokyo) =

Mountain in Tokyo Japan

- Mount Nabekamuri
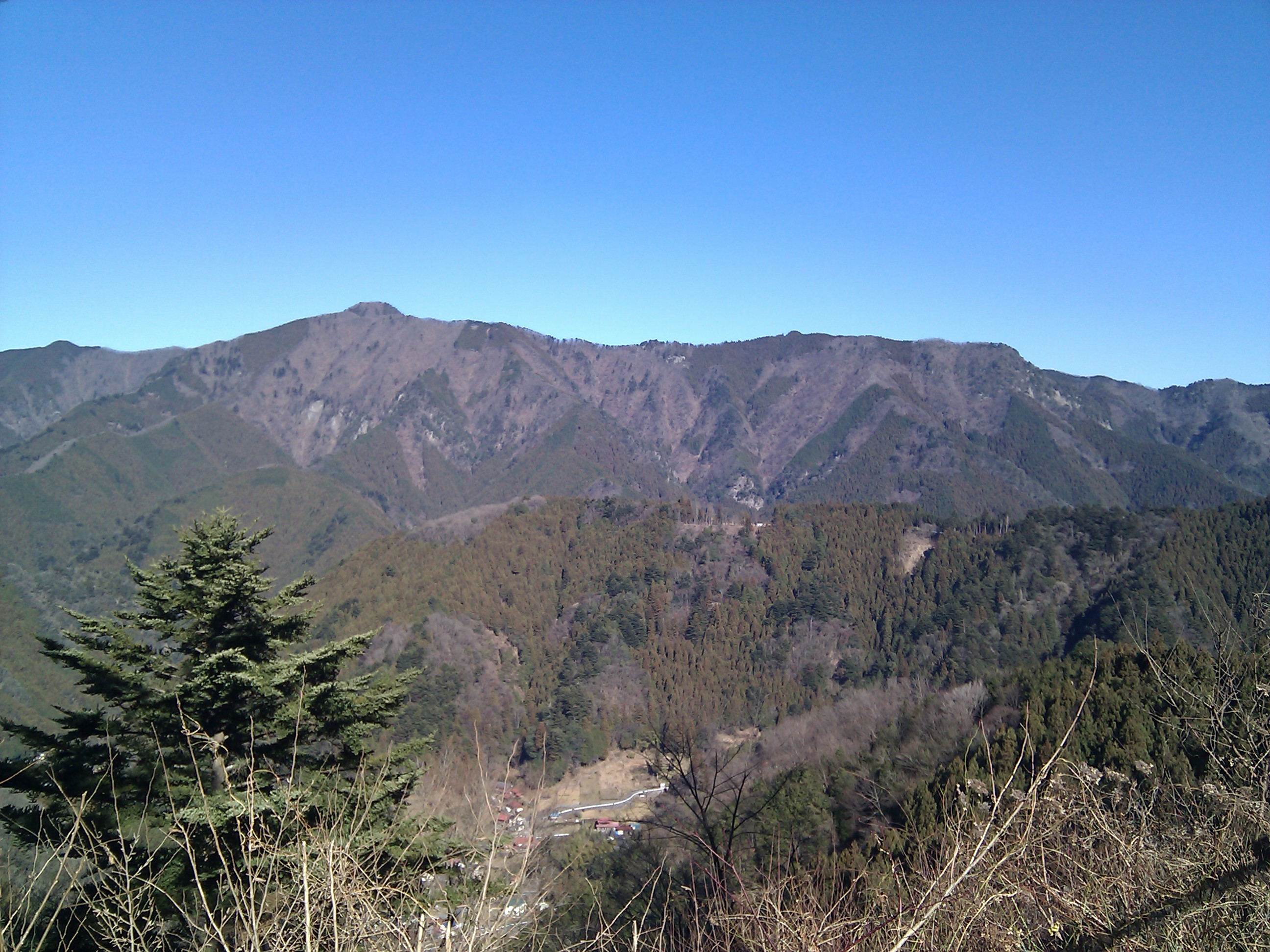
- Mount Odake from the SSW

Highest point
- Elevation: 1,266.4 m (4,155 ft)
- Prominence: 269 m (883 ft)
- Parent peak: Mount Odake
- Coordinates: 35°45′54″N 139°07′49″E

Naming
- Native name: 大岳山 Oodakesan (Japanese)

Geography
- Location within Japan
- Location: Nishitama District, Tokyo, Japan

Mount Odake (大岳山, Oodakesan) 1,266 m (4,154 ft)) is a mountain located within the Nishi-Okutama District, in the village of Hinohara and the town of Okutama, Tokyo, in western Tokyo, Japan, and located within Chichibu Tama Kai National Park.

The mountain has several hiking routes, and is one of the 200 most famous mountains in Japan (日本二百名山 Nihon 200 meizan), and one of the 100 Famous Mountains in Kanto.

== Climbing ==
One of the most frequently used trails begins at Mitakesan Station (御岳山駅, Mitakesan-eki) (831 m (2,726 ft)), the upper station on the Mitake Tozan Railway, a 2-station funicular operated by the Keio Group. Because of its relatively convenient access from central Tokyo, this trail can be crowded, especially on weekends or holidays. The trail winds through Mitakesan village towards Mount Mitake (Tokyo) (929 m (3,048 ft)) and Musashi-Mitake Shrine. It takes approximately 2 hours from Mitakesan Station to the summit of Mount Odake. The trail is well-groomed throughout the year, and approximately the first 1/3 of the trail is paved. Some chain work is required in later sections. It is also possible to hike the entire route from JR Mitake station, adding an approximate 90 minutes of time, crossing the Tama River on a footbridge.

From the summit of Mount Odake, it is possible to continue to Mount Nokogiri (1,109 m (3,638 ft)) and eventually to descend to Oku-Tama Station (343 m (1,125 ft)). This portion of the trail is entirely unpaved, and has many uneven sections, with several chain and ladder sections as well. This trail, from Mitakesan Station through to Oku-Tama Station, takes approximately 5-6 hours. Several hiking websites rate this trail 3 out 5 for difficulty. Many climbers hike the trail in reverse, starting at Oku-Tama Station, and this has greater elevation gains.

== See also ==
- Okutama
- Chichibu Tama Kai National Park
