= Tamagawa brothers =

The Tamagawa brothers, Shōemon (庄右衛門) and Seiemon (清右衛門), were two Japanese engineers who played a crucial part in the construction of the Tamagawa Aqueduct during the Edo period.

== Construction of the Tamagawa Aqueduct ==
The Tamagawa Aqueduct, a 43-kilometer (27-mile) long channel, brought fresh water from the Tama River to Edo, significantly improving the city's water supply and sanitation. The brothers successfully completed the aqueduct in just 18 months.

== Recognition and Legacy ==
In recognition of their achievement, the brothers were awarded the surname "Tamagawa" by the shogunate, a significant honor for commoners at the time.
