= Chichibu Tama Kai National Park =

National park in Kantō, Japan

Chichibu-Tama-Kai National Park
- 秩父多摩甲斐国立公園
- IUCN category II (national park)
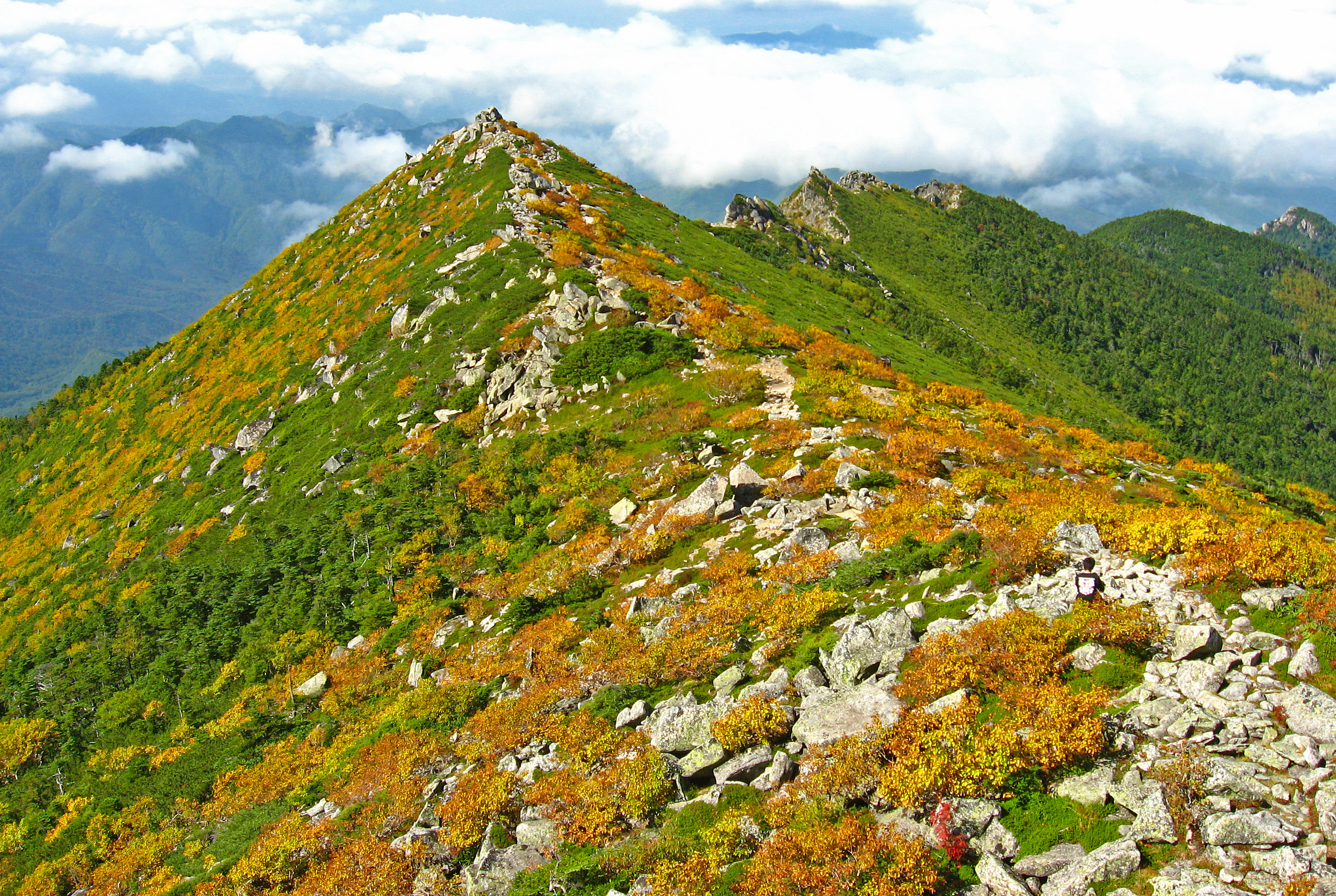
- Mount Kimpu

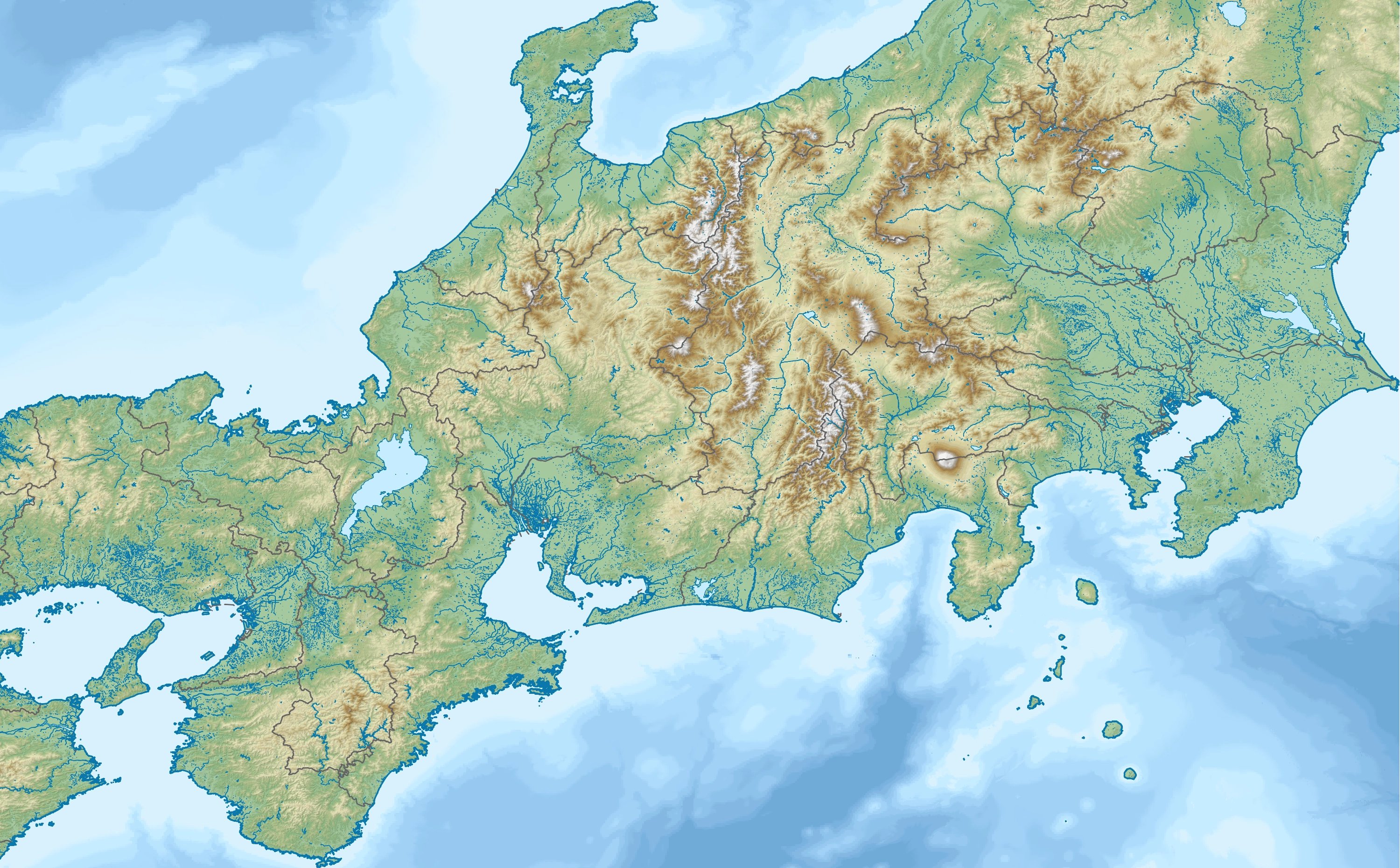
- Location within Central Japan Location within Japan
- Location: Kantō and Chūbu regions, Honshū, Japan
- Coordinates: 35°54′N 138°43′E
- Area: 1,216 km^{2} (470 sq mi)
- Established: July 10, 1950

Chichibu-Tama-Kai National Park (秩父多摩甲斐国立公園, Chichibu Tama Kai Kokuritsu Kōen) is a national park in Japan at the intersection of Saitama, Yamanashi, Nagano and Tokyo Prefectures.

With eight peaks over 2000 m scattered over 1250 km^{2}, there are numerous hiking trails and ancient shrines. The best known landmarks are Mount Mitsumine (三峰山, Mitsumine-san), home to the 2000-year-old Mitsumine Shrine; and Mount Mitake, with the Musashi-Mitake Shrine. The park has sources of major rivers such as the Arakawa River, Shinano River, Tama River, and Fuefuki River (Fuji River).

== Popular areas ==
=== Tokyo Metropolis side ===
The major points of interest are Mount Mitake (929 m (3,048 ft)), Mount Odake (1,266 m (4,154 ft))and Mount Mito (1,528 m (5,013 ft)).

Mount Mitake is positioned on the eastern border of the national park. It has been worshiped as a sacred mountain from the time of antiquity. On its peak stands a Shinto shrine, Musashi-Mitake Shrine (武蔵御嶽神社, Musashi Mitake Jinja), which was established during the reign of Emperor Sujin in 90 B.C. The building houses a Zaōgonge Statue made in 736. At present, a cable-car service allows visitors easy access.

Mount Mito consists of three peaks: the Western Peak (1,527 m), Central Peak (1,531 m), and Eastern Peak (1,528 m). The mountain is part of a northern section of the Oku-takao Ridge (奥高尾縦走路, Oku-takao Jūsōro) that runs northeast from Mount Takao, Hachiōji, Tokyo. The mountain is famous for its forest of Fagus japonica and was voted to be one of the best 100 mountains in Japan in 1997. It is also the source of the Aki River, a major tributary of the Tama River.

=== Saitama Prefecture side ===
The main attractions are the Tochimoto Sekisho Historical Site (栃本関所跡, Tochimoto Sekisho-ato) and Nakatsu Canyon (中津峡, Nakatsu-kyō).

The location of the Tochimoto Sekisho Historical Site sits at the junction of the Chichibu Trail that goes through the Karisaka Pass toward Kōshū and the Shinshū Route heading for Shinshū through the Jūmonji Pass. Although the site at present is located in a small settlement on the mountains, at its heyday, many travelers went through this location. The historic site offers a glimpse of that period when the path was frequented by travelers.

Nakatsu Canyon is a canyon that extends roughly 10 km and is carved by the Nakatsu River, a tributary of the Arakawa River. In particular, around in November many visitors are attracted to this location for fall foliage.

=== Yamanashi Prefecture side ===
Major attractions include the Daibosatsu Pass (大菩薩峠, Daibosatsu-tōge), Mitake Shosēn Gorge (御岳昇仙峡, Mitake Shosēn-kyō), and Nishizawa Canyon (西沢渓谷, Nishizawa-keikoku).

The Daibosatsu Pass is a pass that is famous from the novel The Sword of Doom by Kaizan Nakazato. The pass resides between Kōshū, Yamanashi and Kosuge, Yamanashi and rises to 1897 m. North of the pass along the ridge stands Mount Daibosatu (大菩薩嶺, Daibosatsu-rei), 2,057 m in height above sea level. The pass is sometimes called the “Hagiwara Road”, “Daibosatu Road”, or “Oume Way”. Historically, it was used as an important but most strenuous leg of the Oume Route, an alternate route to Kōshū Kaidō, which connects Musashi Province and Kai Province. In 1878, a renovation to the nearby Yanagisawa Pass shifted traffic away from the Daibosatsu Pass. In recent years, a mountain hut has been constructed. The ridge provides magnificent vistas with a grass land with fireweed flowers. Around May and October the site is visited by many hikers to see fireweed flowers and autumn foliage with the cable car extending to the Kamihikawa Pass.

The Mitake Shosēn Gorge is a gorge carved by a tributary of the Fuefuki River located on the northern side of the Kōfu Basin. It is often shortened to the Shosēn Gorge. Granite rocks curved into various shapes by the river embellish the gorge. In 2008, the location was ranked in the best 100 waterways by the Ministry of the Environment. The location is inhabited by a large population of birds. Visitors started to come to the gorge through the Kōshū Kaidō during the Edo period. In 1964 and in 1972 opened Shosēn Gorge Ropeway and Mitake Shosēn Gorge Turnpike, respectively, making it a major tourist destination year around. During the holidays seasons, traffic jam on the turnpike and difficulty with parking due to limited availability often take place. In 1992, the Shosēnkyō Museum of Art, which mainly displays shadow play and kirigami exhibits, was built nearby.

The Nishisawa Canyon is a canyon carved by the Fuefuki River located upstream of Hirose Lake. It is situated at the northern part of Yamanashi Prefecture to the northeast of Hirose Lake, to the north of Mount Kurogane, to the east of Mt. Kokushi, Mt. Kita Okusenjō, and Mt. Okusenjō, and to the south of Mt. Tosaka and Mt. Kobushi. The entrance to the canyon is located along National Route 140. In the proximity a rest area, the Roadside Station Mitomi, and the Karisaka Tunnel. The canyon features falls and stream pools with a well-maintained trail. Toward the end of the trail is the Nanatsugama-godan Fall (七ツ釜五段ノ滝), one of the best 100 falls in Japan. A portion of old railway tracks, Shirnrin Railway, is visible on the opposite side of the river.

=== Nagano Prefecture side ===
The major point of interest is the Chikuma River Upstream Course (千曲川源流コース). The popular route is a mountainous trail stretching from Mōkiba (毛木場) to Mount Kobushi (甲武信岳). Mōkiba is famous for azaleas in June and an entrance to the Jūmonji Pass (十文字峠). Mount Kobushi is a mountain that sits between the border between Saitama Prefecture and Nagano Prefecture, rising to 2,475 m above sea level. One theory for the origins of the name accounts that the three characters Ko (甲), Bu (武), and Shin (信) stand for the initial characters of the old provinces Kōshū (甲州), Bushū (武州), and Shinshū (信州). The mountain is also known as the source of the Chikuma River, the Nagano Prefecture portion of the Shinano River.

== Visitor centers ==
There are three visitor centers Mitake Visitor Center, Okutama Visitor Center, and Yama-no-furusato Visitor Center.

== See also ==
- List of national parks of Japan
- Okuchichibu Mountains
