= Futomani =

Shinto system of divination

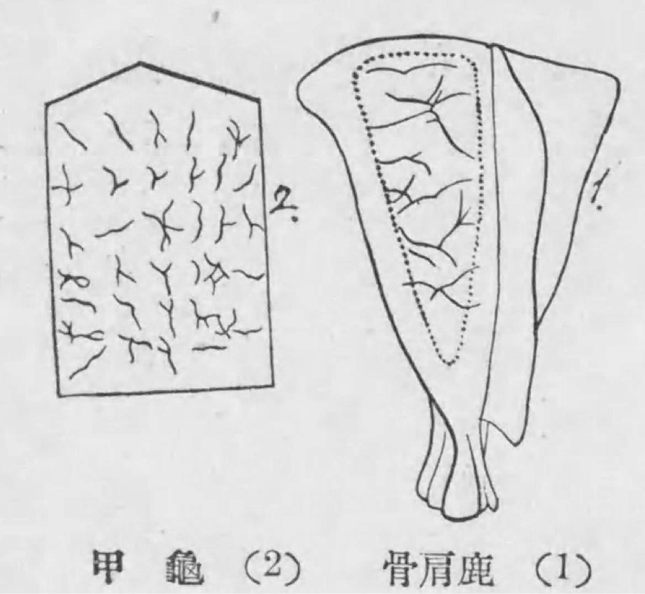
Kiboku and Futomani

Futomani (太占) is a traditional Shinto system of divination. Practitioners attempt to foresee future events by interpreting the pattern of cracks made by heating the shoulder-blade of a stag. The practice is thought to predate the introduction of divination by tortoiseshell, which was imported from China; archaeological evidence suggests it originated as early as the Jōmon period.

The kami most commonly associated with futomani is Uraniwa-no-Kami (占庭の神; lit. "Divination Divinity"), also known as Futonorito-no-Mikoto (太祝詞の命; lit. "Thick Congratulatory Address [of] Life"), a special kami of divination.

Futomani is still practiced at the Shinto shrine on Mount Mitake as an annual event.

In aikido, futomani is considered an important adjunct to kotodama practice.

== See also ==
- Glossary of Shinto
- Oracle bones
