= Tamagawa Aqueduct =

Aqueduct in Tokyo, Japan

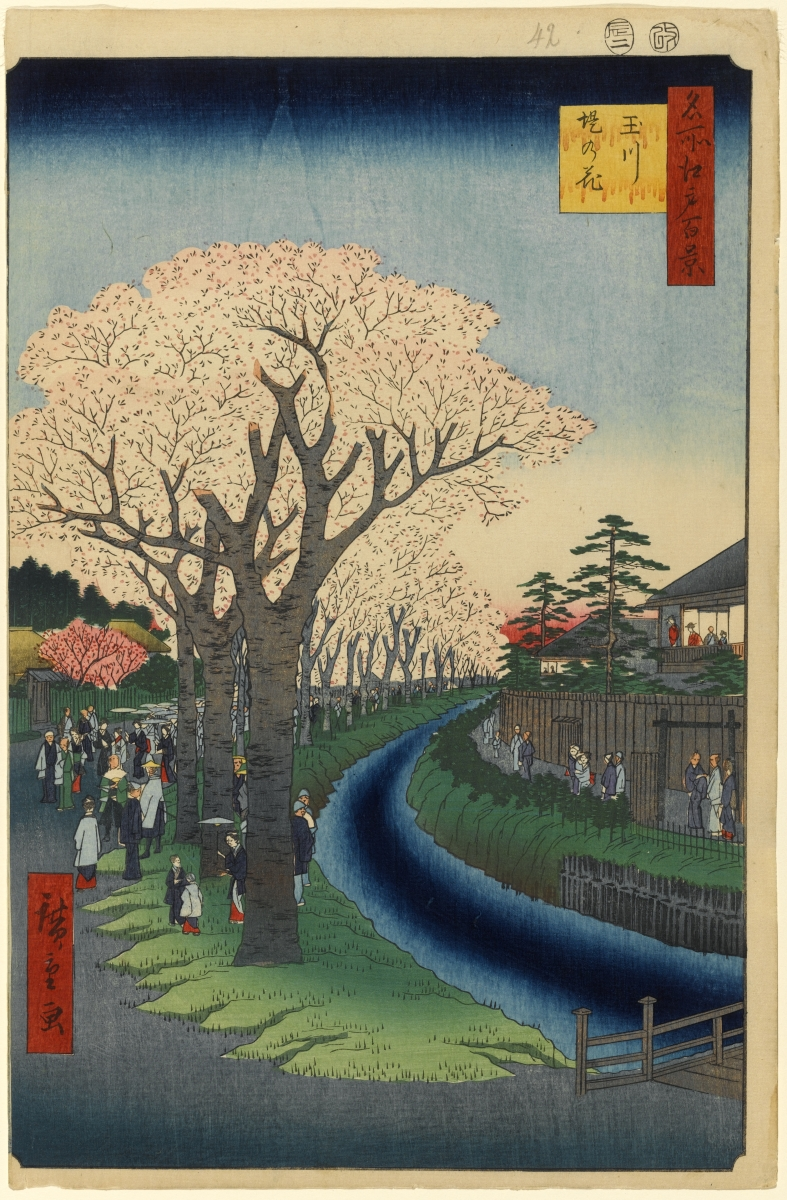
Cherry blossoms in Tamagawa-zutsumi by Hiroshige

The Tamagawa Aqueduct (玉川上水, Tamagawa Jōsui) is a historic 43‑kilometre, gravity‑fed waterway constructed in 1653–54 under the Tokugawa shogunate to transport water from the Tama River into Edo. Originally built to supply drinking water and irrigation for rural villages on the Musashino Plateau through numerous branch canals, the aqueduct remained central to Edo's water infrastructure for more than two centuries. In the present day, parts of the original route—especially the upstream segment—continue to serve as one of several raw‑water intake routes in Tokyo's municipal water‑supply system.

== History ==
The impetus for the aqueduct came from severe water shortages in Edo. As Edo's population expanded under the sankin-kōtai system and other demographic pressures, the city's first major water supply, the Kanda Aqueduct, proved insufficient. The Tokugawa shogunate commissioned two townsmen–engineer brothers, Shōemon and Seiemon (庄右衛門 and 清右衛門), to lead the project.

Construction began in April 1653. By November of the same year, the open-cut segment from Hamura to Yotsuya-Ōkido (四谷大木戸, one of the Edo's Great Wooden-gates, at Yotsuya) was completed — a remarkable achievement in just eight months. The full aqueduct, including its underground conduits, was fully operational by June 1654. In recognition of their success, the brothers were granted the family name “Tamagawa” (玉川) by the shogunate.

Over the Edo period, the aqueduct supported a large part of the city. Wooden and stone conduits branched off from the main channel, delivering water to samurai residences and commoner row houses. According to historical accounts, the water utility system of Edo under Tamagawa Jōsui contributed to public health by providing reliable, fresh water to a city of more than one million people.

In addition to supplying the city, more than 30 branch canals (bunsui, 分水) were built from the main aqueduct, delivering water to agricultural areas. These branches included important supply channels such as the Nobidome Yosui, which irrigated the Musashino Plateau, thereby enabling farmland development around Edo.

== Engineering and Structure ==
The aqueduct is engineered around a very gentle gradient—approximately 92 meters of elevation difference over its entire 43 km length. This gradient allows water to flow by gravity alone, without the need for mechanical pumping.

The upstream portion from Hamura is largely an open-cut earth channel, dug through the Musashino Plateau. In contrast, once the canal approaches the dense urban area of Edo, the water is carried in buried wooden and stone conduits beneath streets and residential areas. These conduits distribute water efficiently throughout the city core.

The earth embankments alongside the waterway were later reinforced and stabilized, and in the 18th century (from around 1737), yamazakura (山桜, wild cherry) trees were planted along significant portions of the embankment, creating a tree-lined corridor that still survives in part today.

== Modern use ==
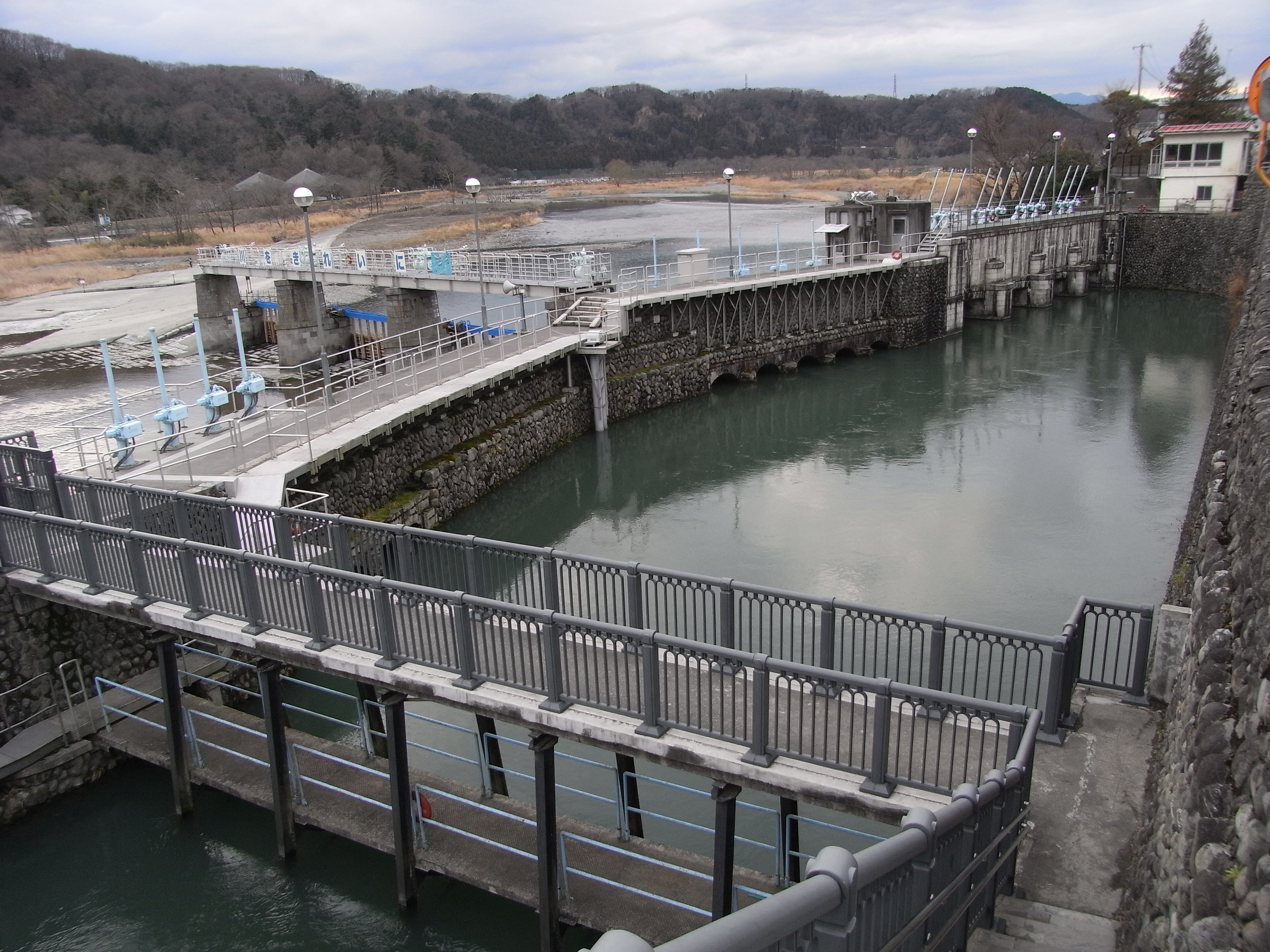
Water intake at Hamura, Tokyo

After the Meiji Restoration, the Tamagawa Aqueduct gradually became integrated into Tokyo's emerging modern water-supply infrastructure. For many years, water was channeled toward the Yodobashi Purification Plant, supporting the growing urban demand.

In more recent decades, particularly from 1986, portions of the aqueduct—especially in the midstream area—were revitalized through water-management projects such as Tokyo's “Clear‑Stream Revival,” using highly treated reclaimed water to restore flow.

Today, the aqueduct's upstream section (from Hamura to near Kodaira) continues to operate as a raw-water intake route for Tokyo's modern water system, coexisting with green space and walking trails.

== Conservation and heritage ==
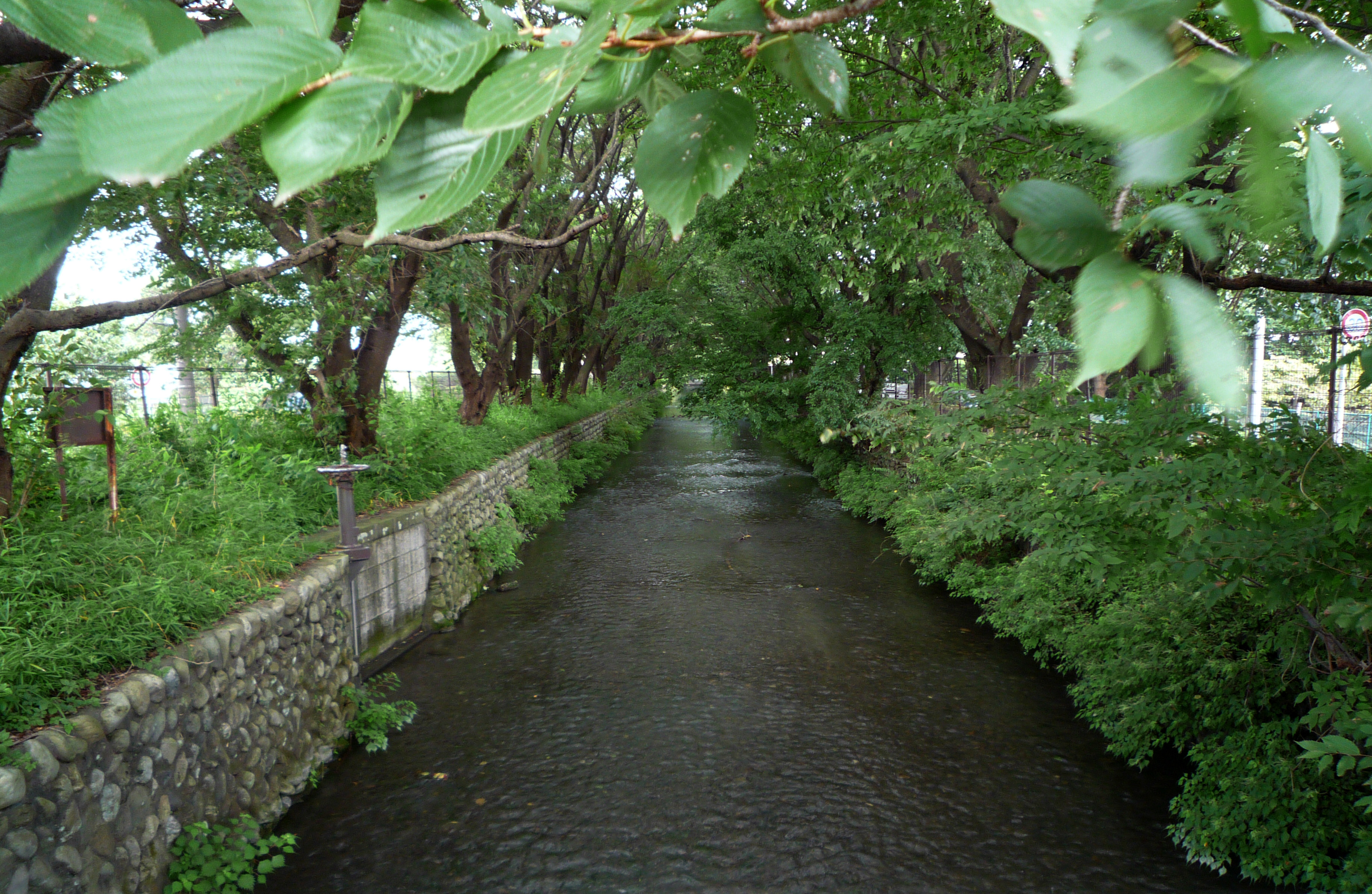
Tamagawa Aqueduct viewed from Mikage Bridge, in Sunagawa‑chō, Tachikawa, Tokyo(approx. 35.78214 N, 139.395055 E)

Tokyo Metropolitan Government's Bureau of Waterworks has adopted a long-term Historic Site Preservation & Utilization Plan for the Tamagawa Aqueduct, recognizing it as both vital infrastructure and a cultural green corridor.

The midstream section (approximately 18 km between Kodaira monitoring station and Asama Bridge) has been divided into seven conservation zones based on topography, vegetation condition, and heritage values.

Conservation measures include slope stabilization, embankment reinforcement, and careful management of tree growth, especially of large aged trees, all while preserving the aesthetic cherry-tree rows along historic embankments.

To maintain open dialogue with local communities, the Bureau holds meetings for residents in the canal's midstream areas, such as Mitaka and Suginami, to discuss ongoing conservation work.

An expert advisory committee composed of civil engineers, historians, and conservationists has been convened to guide the preservation plan.

== Cultural and social significance ==
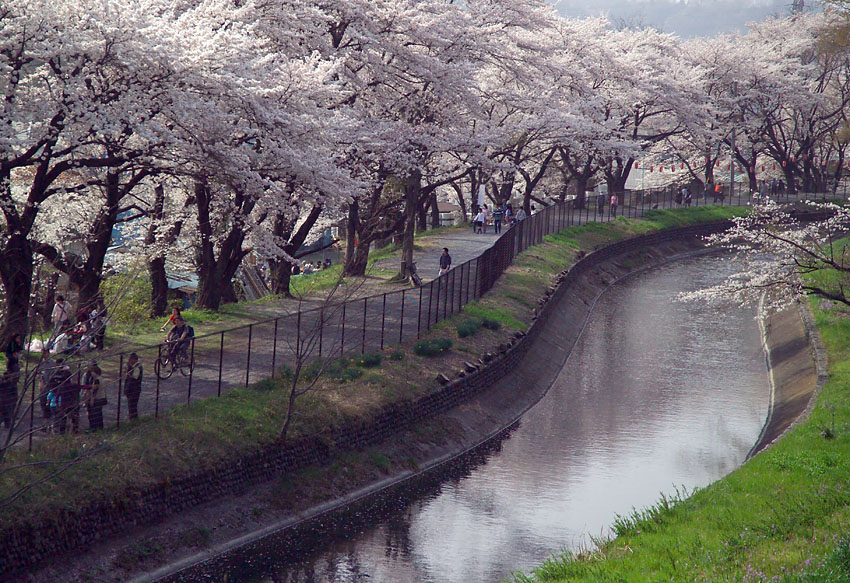
Tamagawa Aqueduct in Hamura 35°44′57.84″N 139°18′59.49″E

The aqueduct remains an emblem of Edo-period ingenuity in water management and technology. Its historically exposed earthworks and canal embankments are valued as a civil engineering heritage site.

The wooded embankments, lined with wild cherry trees (yamazakura, 山桜), form a green corridor that is popular with walkers, bird watchers, and history enthusiasts.

In 2003, a large portion of the open‑cut canal (around 30 km) was designated a National Historic Site, recognizing its importance as both a waterway and a cultural landscape.

== Legacy ==
Over the centuries, the Tamagawa Aqueduct has bridged past and present. As a functional piece of water‑supply infrastructure, it still contributes to Tokyo's water system, and as a cultural landscape, it remains a living reminder of Edo‑period urban planning. Its preservation continues to benefit both the city's residents and visitors as a green, historical corridor — a testament to the enduring legacy of Edo's water‑infrastructure vision.

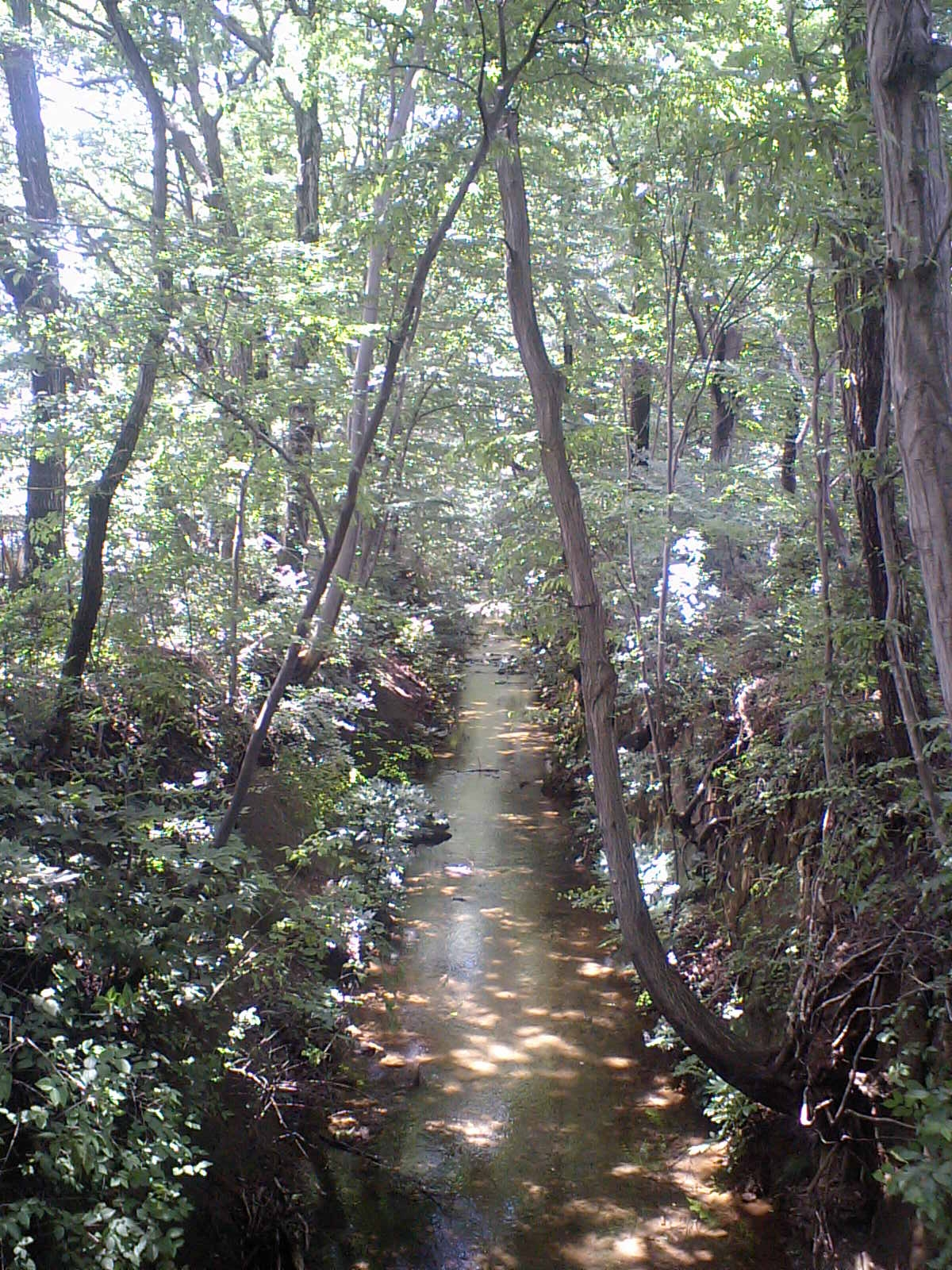
Tamagawa Aqueduct in Tachikawa 35°43′41.74″N 139°25′48.59″E

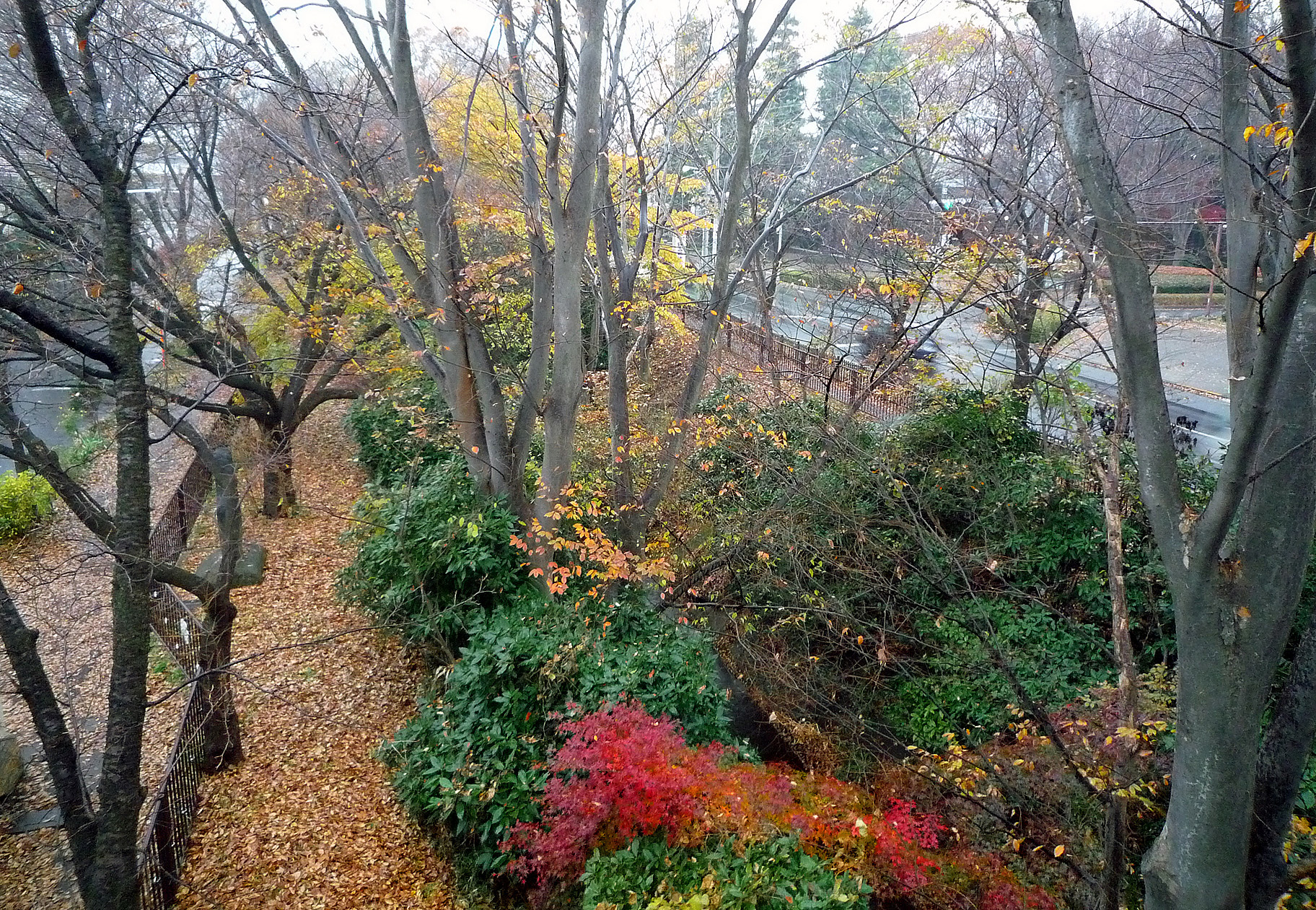
Tamagawa Aqueduct in Koganei 35°42′45.46″N 139°31′05.36″E

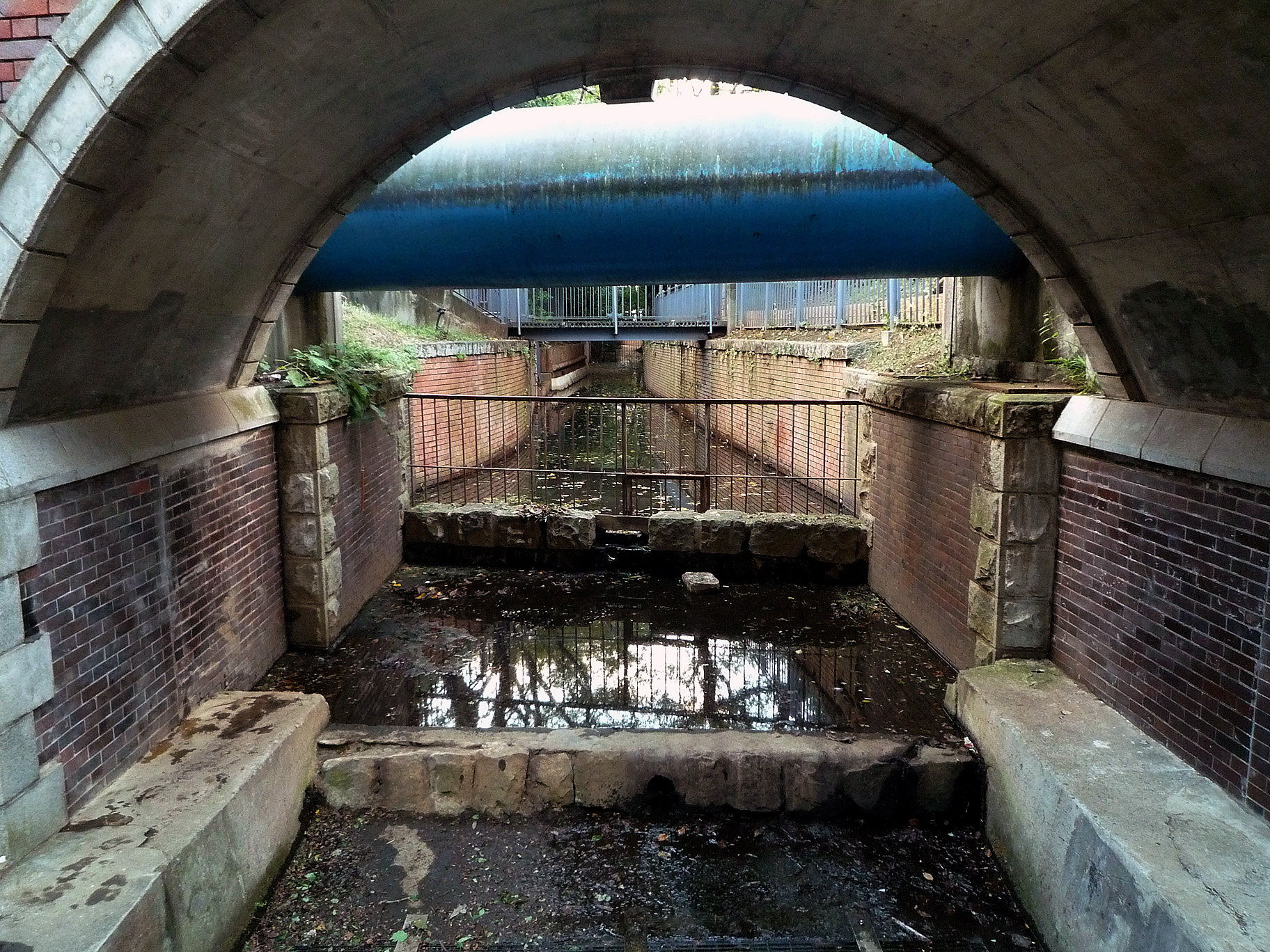
Tamagawa Aqueduct near Daitabashi Station, Setagaya 35°40′15.96″N 139°39′36.21″E
