= Musashino Plateau =

Large tableland in Kantō region, Japan

Musashino Plateau 武蔵野台地
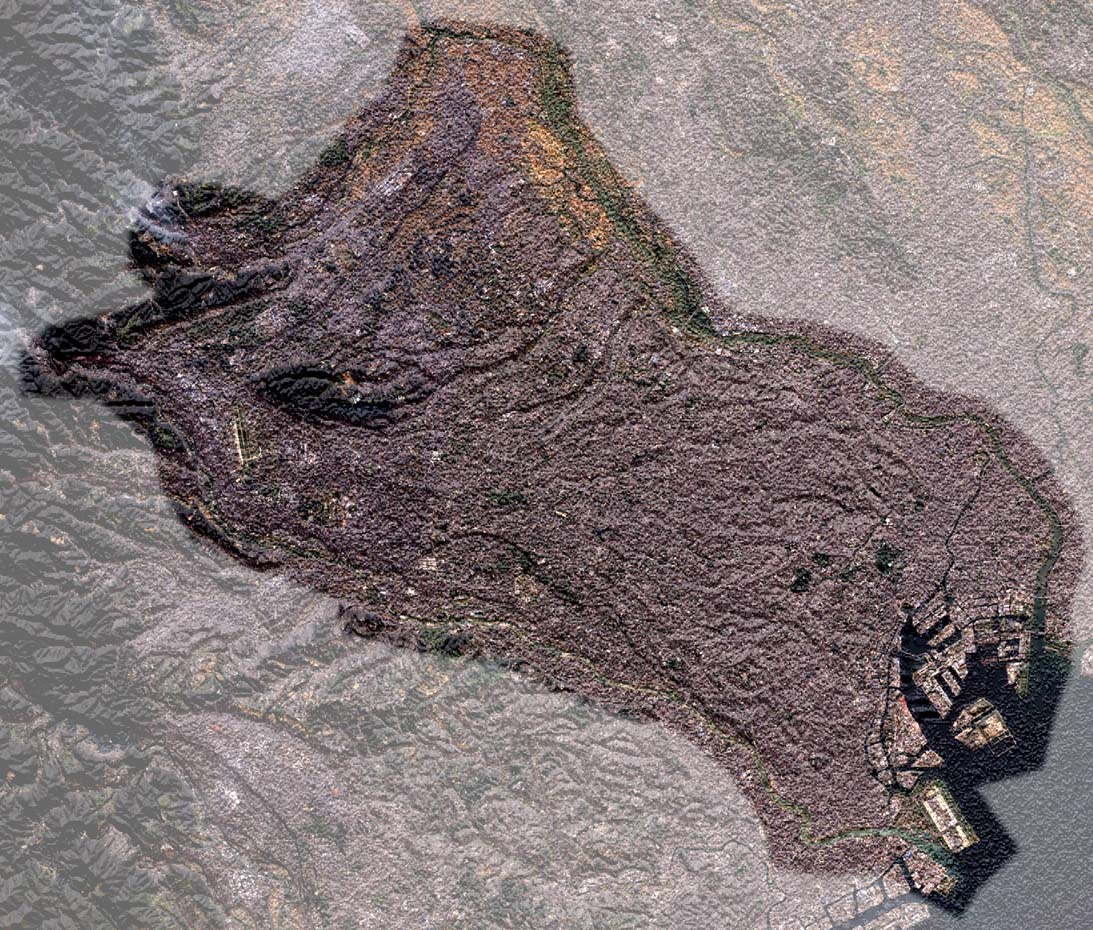
- Musashino Plateau and riverbank lowlands of the Arakawa and Tama rivers, northwest of Tokyo Bay.

The Musashino Plateau (武蔵野台地, Musashino daichi), also translated from Japanese as Musashino Platform and also named Musashino Region, is a large tableland that sits between the Arakawa and Tama rivers in the Kantō region of Honshu, Japan. The plateau consists of an alluvial fan formed by the ancient Tama River, covered by a layer of loam formed from volcanic ash.

== Location ==
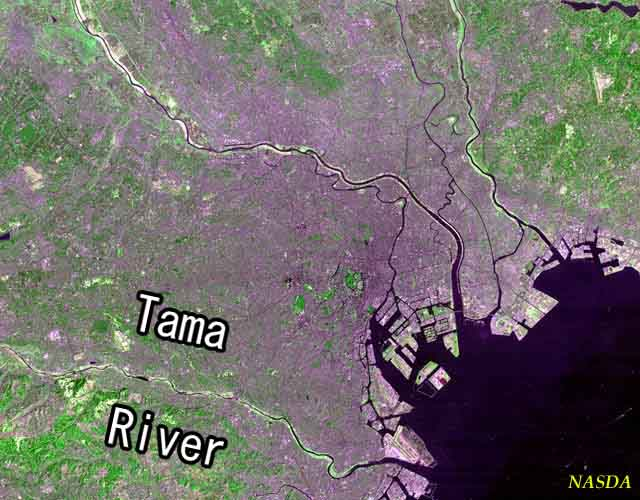
Tama River, in a Landsat photo of the Tokyo area.

The plateau is part of the Kantō Plain. It sits northwest of Tokyo Bay, in the southwest of the plain. Its northern section is in southern Saitama Prefecture. Much of Tokyo, between the Tama River to the south and the Arakawa River to the north, is built on the plateau.

== Origin ==
The Tama River carved the Okutama Mountains and deposited a large alluvial fan that spread out from Ōme. The fan is the base layer of the Musashino Plateau, and is covered by the Kantō Loam Formation, which is 5 to 15 meters thick. The loam is primarily andesite or basaltic sandy mud formed from volcanic ash that the wind carried west from Mount Fuji.

Two types of developed fluvial terraces (river terraces) are found on the plateau. One is formed by the flow of the Tama River on the south side. The lowest terrace (low surface) is the Tachikawa terrace, and the terrace one step higher than that (high surface) is the Musashino terrace. The other is in the north and is thought to be a remnant of the former Tama River channel.
