= Tama River =

River in Kantō, Japan

Coordinates: 35°31′18″N 139°47′54″E

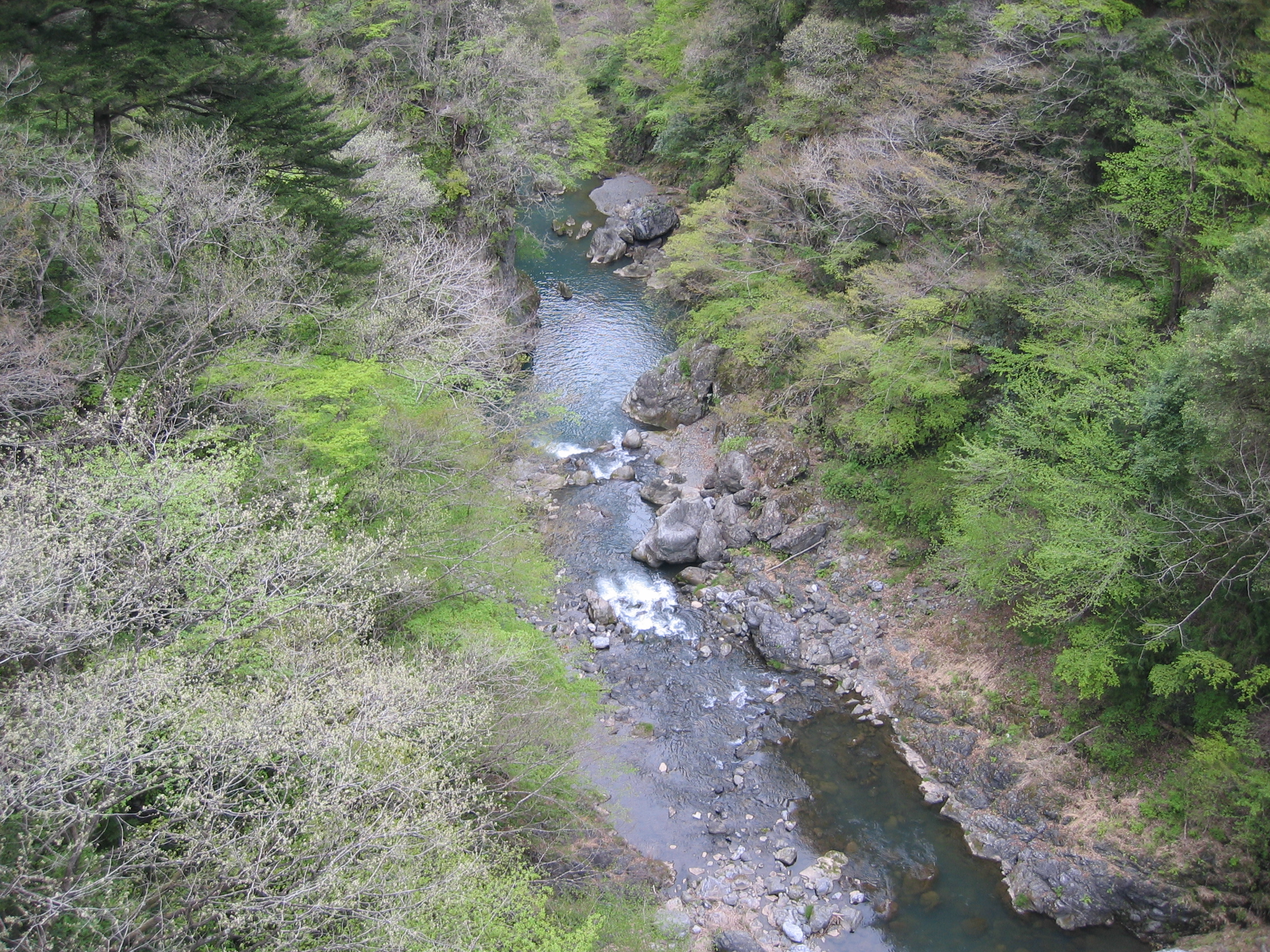

- Location within Japan

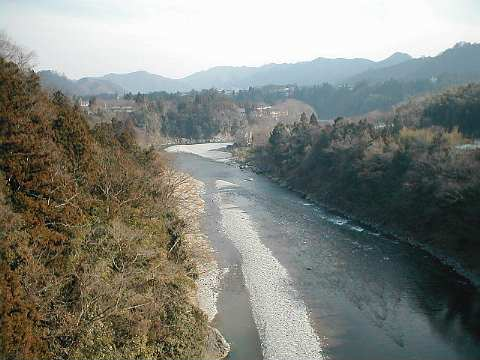
Tama River near the city of Ōme in western Tokyo

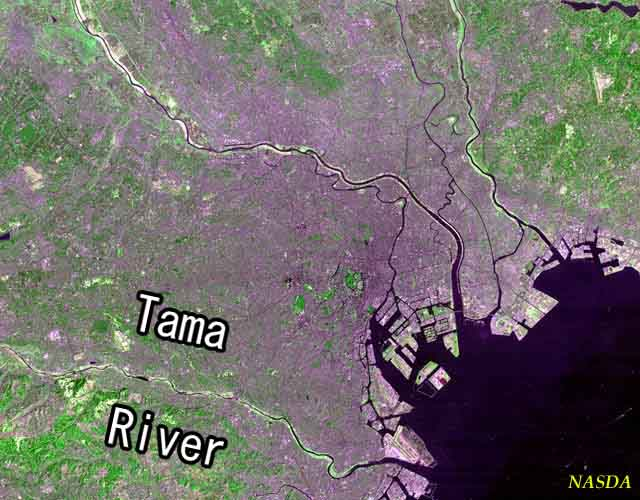
Tama River, in a Landsat photo of the Tokyo area

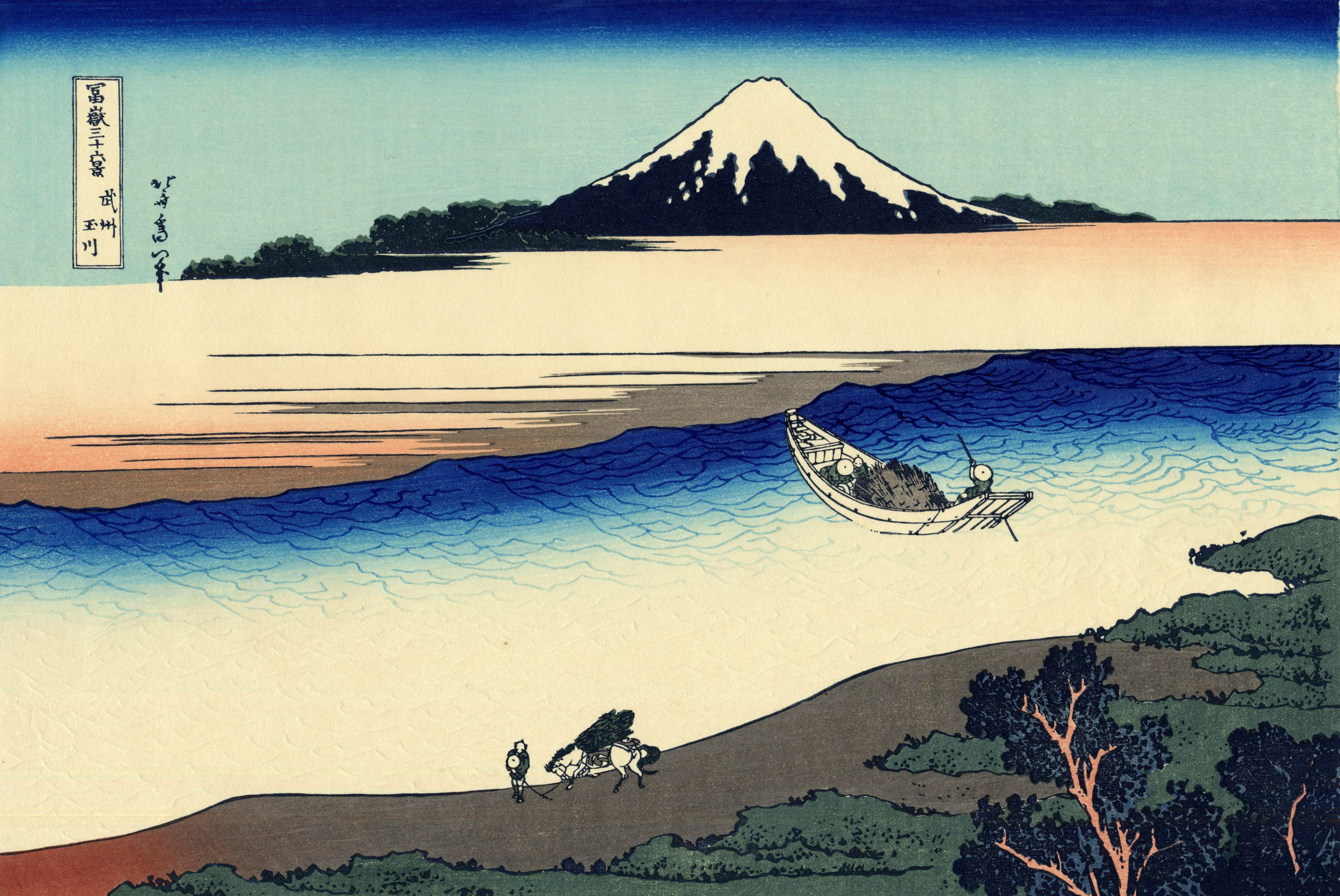
Woodblock printing by Hokusai

The Tama River (多摩川, Tama-gawa) is a major river in Yamanashi, Kanagawa and Tokyo Prefectures on Honshū, Japan. It is officially classified as a Class 1 river by the Japanese government. It is 138 kilometres (86 mi) long, and has a 1,240 square kilometres (480 sq mi) basin.

The river flows through the Greater Tokyo Area, on the dividing line between Tokyo and Kanagawa Prefectures. In Tokyo, its banks are lined with parks and sports fields, making the river a popular picnic spot.

== Course ==
The Tama's source is on Mt. Kasatori in Koshu in Yamanashi Prefecture. From there, it flows eastward into mountainous western Tokyo, where the Ogōchi Dam forms Lake Okutama. Below the dam, it takes the name Tama and flows eastwards through Chichibu Tama Kai National Park to the city of Ōme. It then flows southeast between Tama Hills and Musashino Terrace. At Hamura is the source of the historic Tamagawa Aqueduct built by the Tamagawa brothers in 1653 to supply water to Edo (present day Tokyo). Further downstream, the river forms the boundary between Tokyo and the city of Kawasaki in Kanagawa Prefecture. Its mouth on the heavily industrialised Tokyo Bay is next to Haneda Airport.

== Flooding ==
Tama River is very prone to flooding, and has wrought havoc on surrounding areas throughout history. On occasions the river even changed its course after massive floods, sometimes dividing pre-existing settlements in two. As a result, there are several locations where the place names on opposing sides of the river are the same, such as Todoroki. The current course was set as a result of a 1590 flood.

Levees have been in place for hundreds of years, but floodwaters have breached them numerous times in history. Extensive engineering projects in the early 20th century have dramatically reduced the amount of flood damage, although a 1974 typhoon caused floodwaters to burst a levee in Komae, washing away 19 houses. The levees have not been breached since 1974. Projects to further upgrade the levees have been underway since 1990.

As with most major rivers in Japan, the levees are built some distance away from the river itself to accommodate the extra floodwater. The open expanse between the levees and the river in the middle is covered in grass and shrubbery, forming a useful belt of greenery and wide open space which is used as playing fields in many places. Despite this extra space, the large amount of floodwater produced by Typhoon Hagibis in October 2019 flooded areas of Kawasaki City's Musashi-Kosugi Station and nearby areas, causing infrastructural damage and power outages.

== Wildlife ==
Rapid post-war urbanization of surrounding areas took its toll on Tama River, whose water quality in the urban areas plummeted from the 1950s onwards rendering it uninhabitable for most species. Pollution control measures and the river's official designation as a wildlife protection zone have now led to the return of many species.

Carp, rainbow trout, cherry salmon, iwana (char), ugui (big-scaled redfin) and ayu all inhabit Tama River in sufficient numbers for limited commercial fishing to take place in upstream areas. Recent moves to fit weirs with fish ladders have resulted in a steep increase in the numbers of ayu migrating upstream. Other fish, such as loach inhabit the river, as do crabs, turtles and crayfish.

Japanese cormorants, kingfishers, white wagtails, eastern spot-billed ducks, grey herons, little egrets, Japanese white-eyes, mandarin ducks, and black-headed gulls are among birds often seen at the river. Various types of ducks have made a comeback after the 1969 designation of the river as a wildlife protection zone. The expanse of greenery between the levees and the river itself attract additional wildlife.

In the summer of 2002, Tama-chan, a normally arctic male bearded seal first spotted in the Tama River by the Maruko Bridge, became a major nationwide celebrity.

In recent years the Tama River has been settled by a larger number of non-native species including red-eared slider turtles and tropical fish like piranhas. It is assumed that life for tropical fish became possible because of higher water temperature of river due to global warming and waste water from sewage treatment plants. Those higher temperatures now allow tropical pet fish abandoned by their owners to survive the cold Japanese winters. In the early 2000s, a Kawasaki man named Mitsuaki Yamasaki established a "fish shelter" to house pet fish that owners would otherwise dump into the river.

A large number of stray cats live along the river.

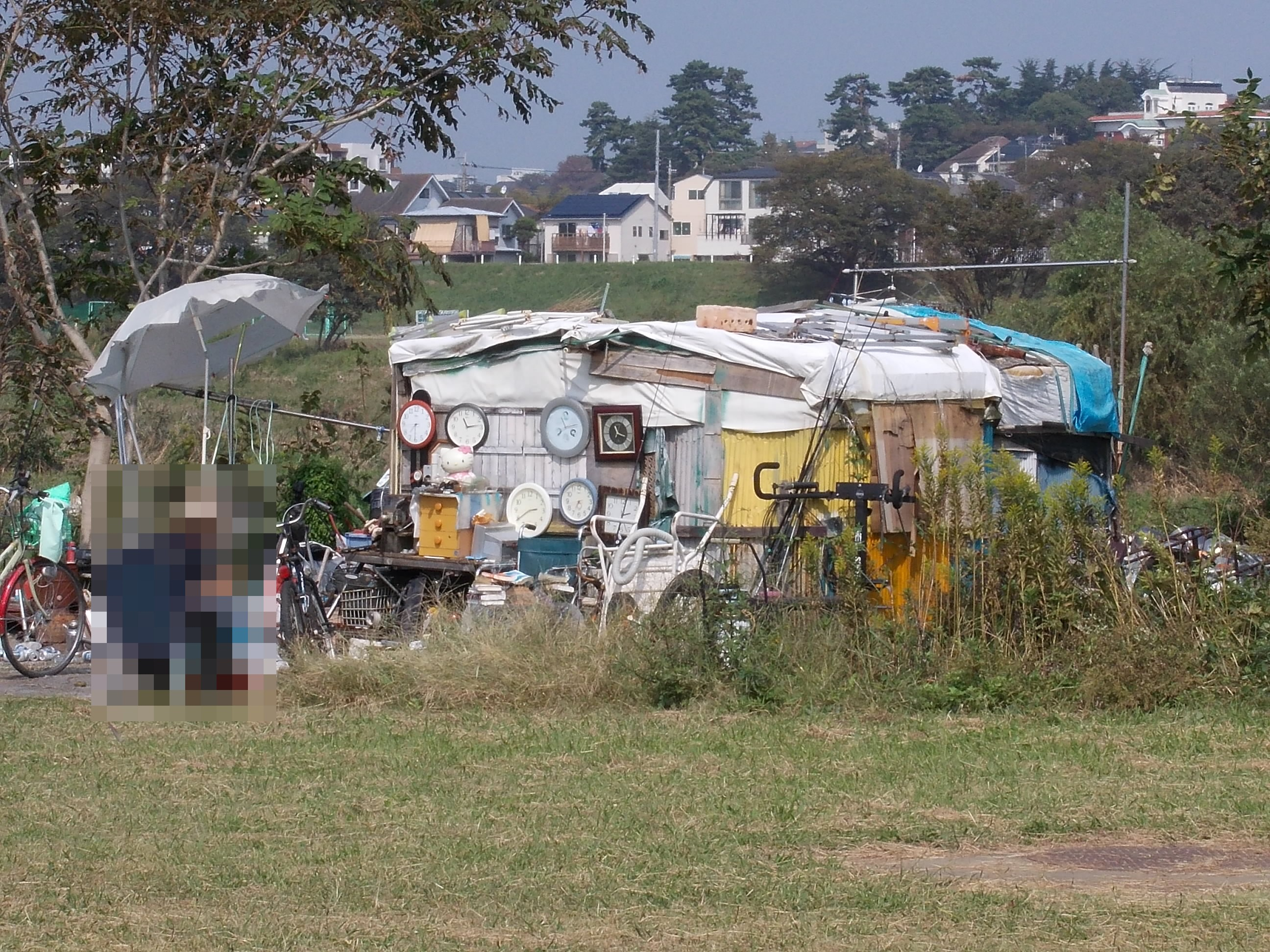
Hut of bohemian in the river basin of Tama River

== Recreation ==
Near the outskirts of Tokyo, the river is a popular kayaking spot, with the Japan National Slalom Kayak competitions being held on the Tama River where it passes through Mitake.

This section of river is used for white water rafting and hydrospeeding destination due to its accessibility from Tokyo. Companies operate seasonally from early spring until late autumn.

The boulders on the riverbed around Mitake also form one of Tokyo's premier climbing (bouldering) spots. Some of Japan's famous boulder problems can be found here, on boulders such as 'Ninja rock' and 'Deadend'.

Further down, sports fields appear on both banks of the river, with many teams practicing or playing a range of sports here on a regular basis, including baseball, soccer and rugby union. (There is a rugby club named after the river, called Tamariba Club.) There are also many playgrounds, park spaces and golf driving ranges found on the side of the river as it passes through the city.

A bike path and running track travels the length of the river through urban Tokyo, extending to the river mouth in Tokyo bay.

== Redevelopment ==
The areas around Tama River on both sides have generally been suburban in nature, with a few low to mid-rise office buildings. High-rises were virtually nonexistent until the late 2000s, with the bottoming of Tokyo's two-decade-long real estate bubble collapse. This has changed with increased rail passenger services due to double tracking and line extensions and thru-services. The skyline has visibly changed at Futako-Tamagawa Station and Musashi-Kosugi Station but there are also renewed developments from Keio-Tamagawa Station area downstream as the combination of urban convenience and wide open river space is an uncommon amenity in Tokyo's typically claustrophobic urban area.

== Other names ==
- Ichinose-gawa (Ichinose River) – its upper stream
- Taba-gawa (Taba River) – its upper stream
- Rokugo-gawa (Rokugo River) – near its mouth

== Gallery ==
Wildlife along the Tama river

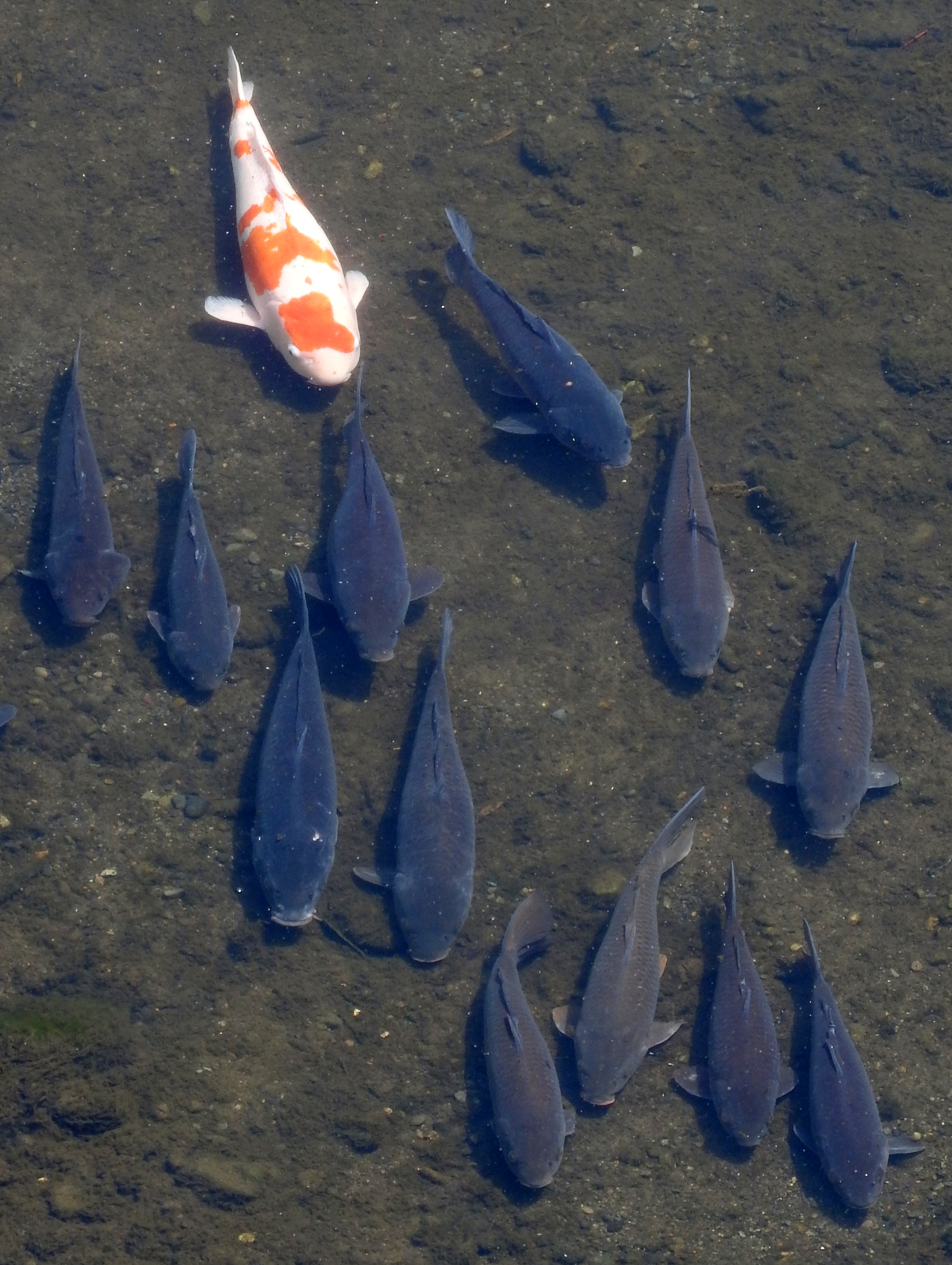
A school of carp swimming in the river

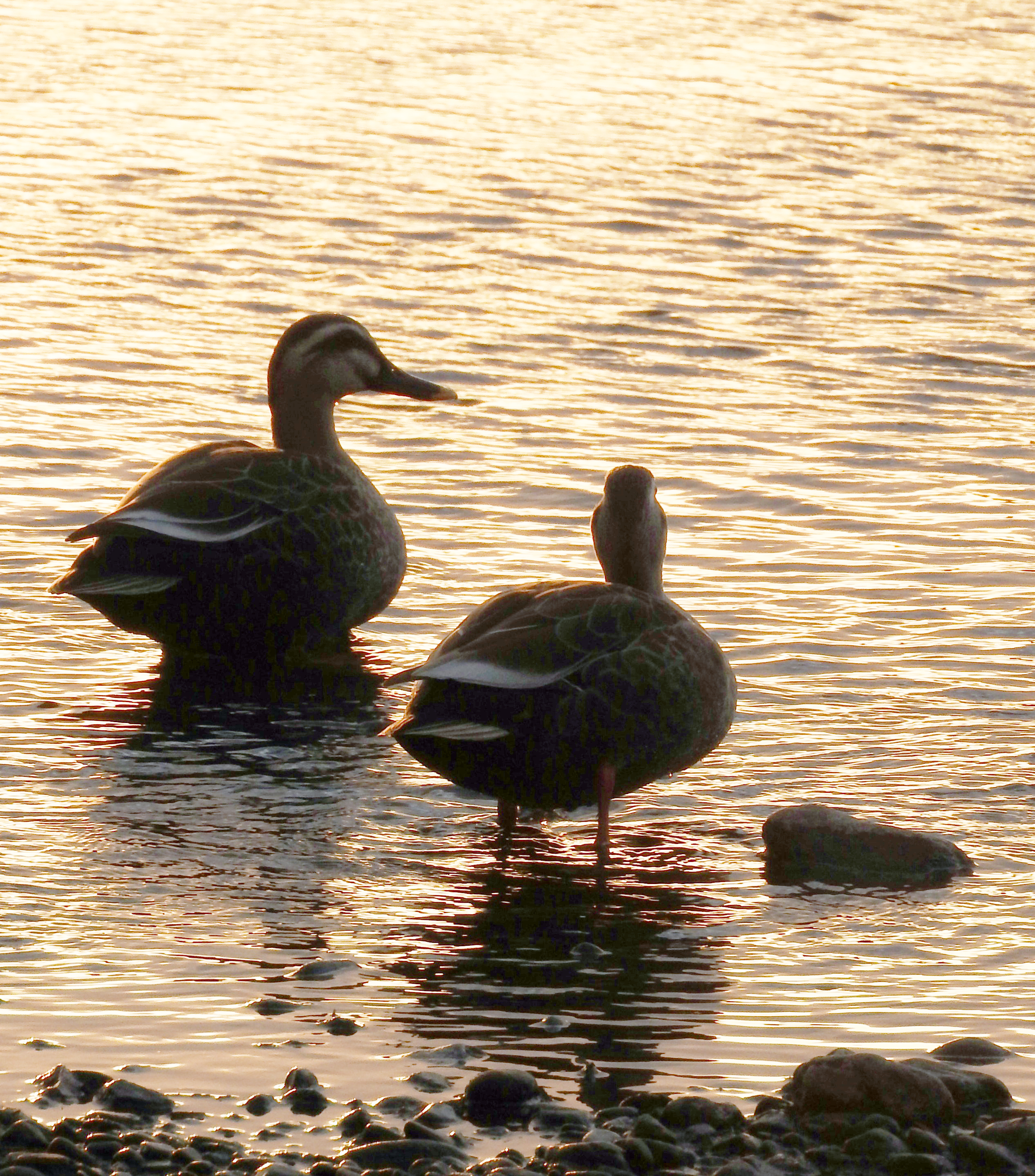
A pair of eastern spot-billed ducks in the river

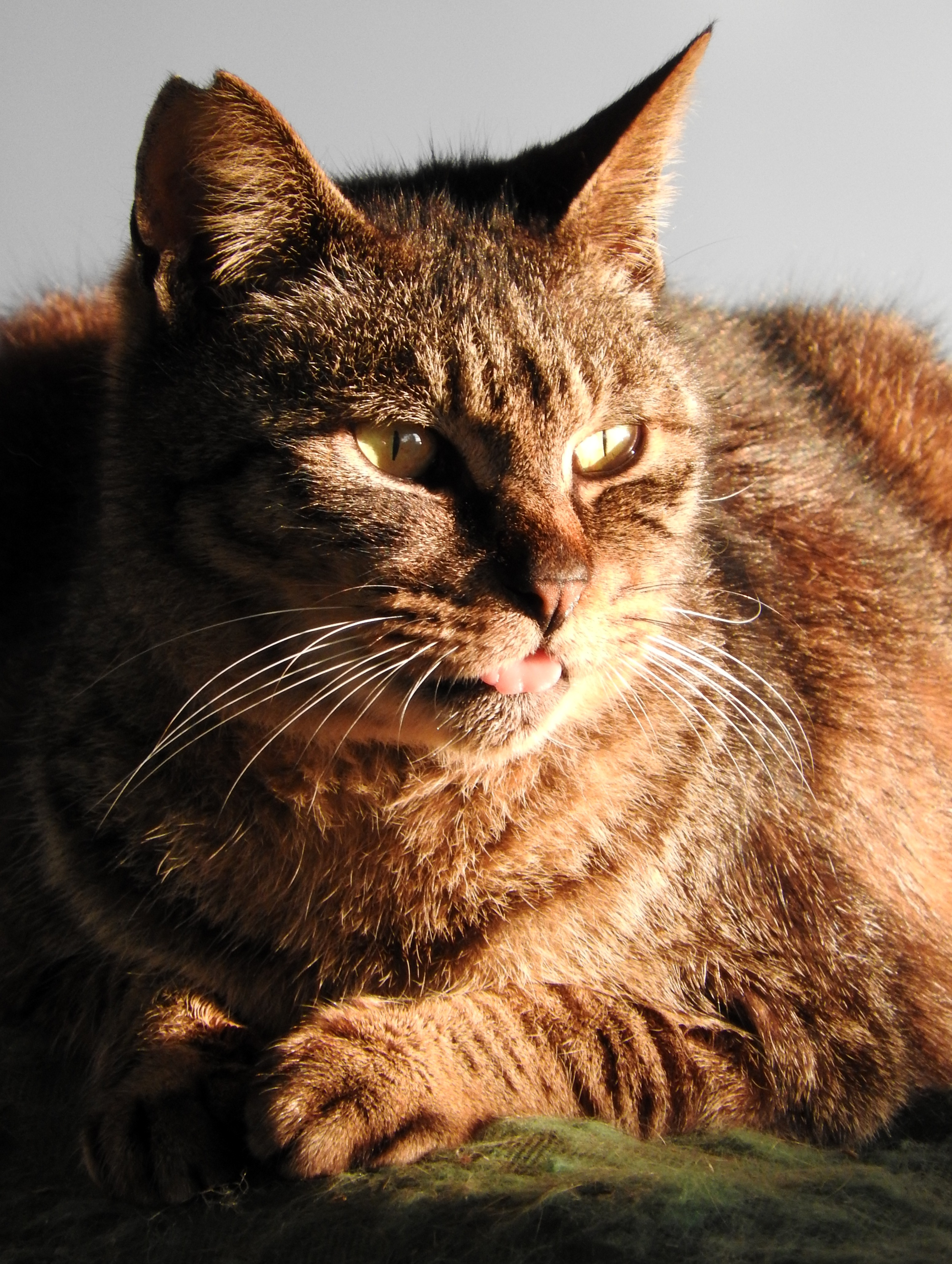
A stray cat resting by the river

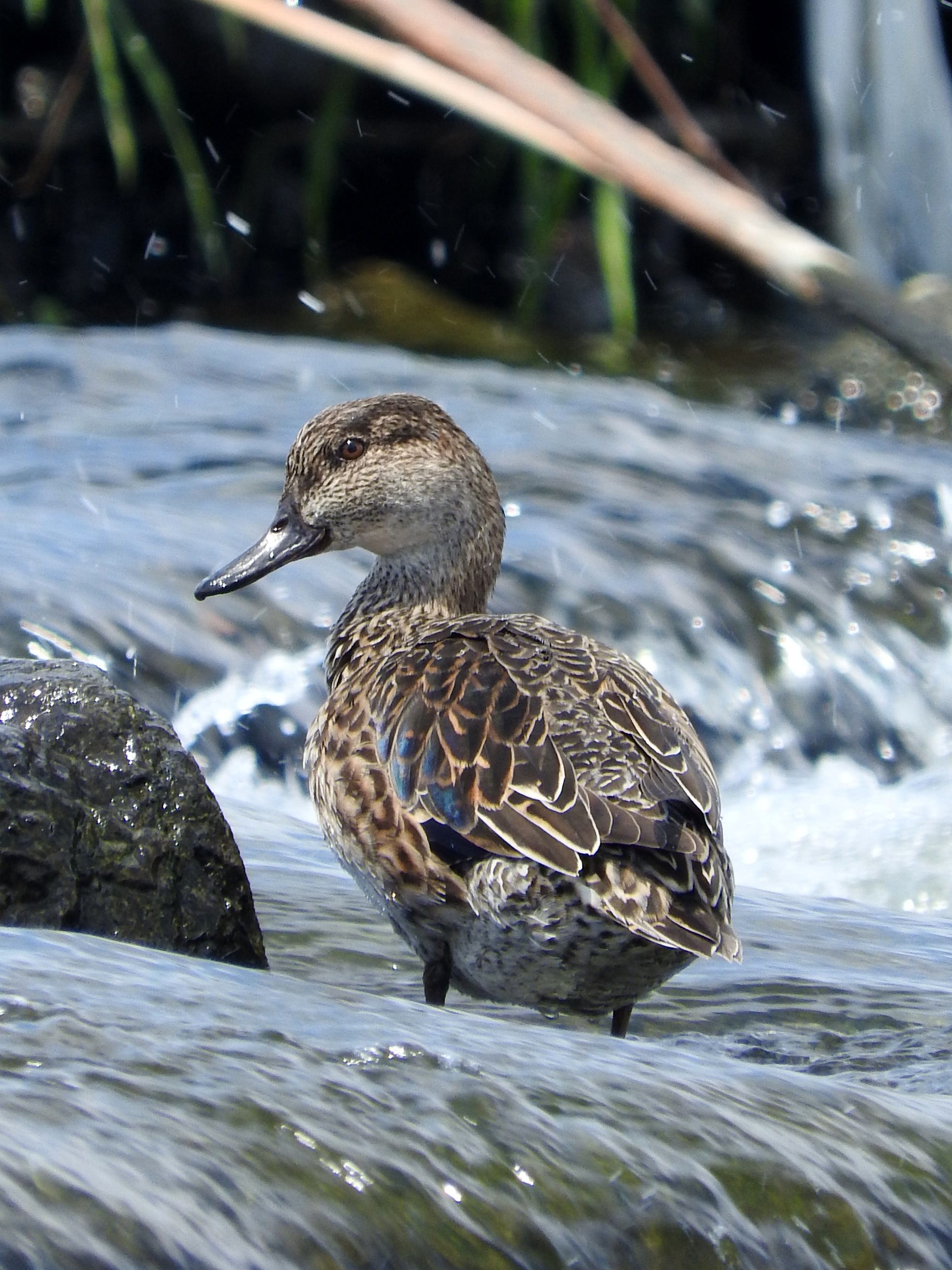
A female Eurasian teal in the river

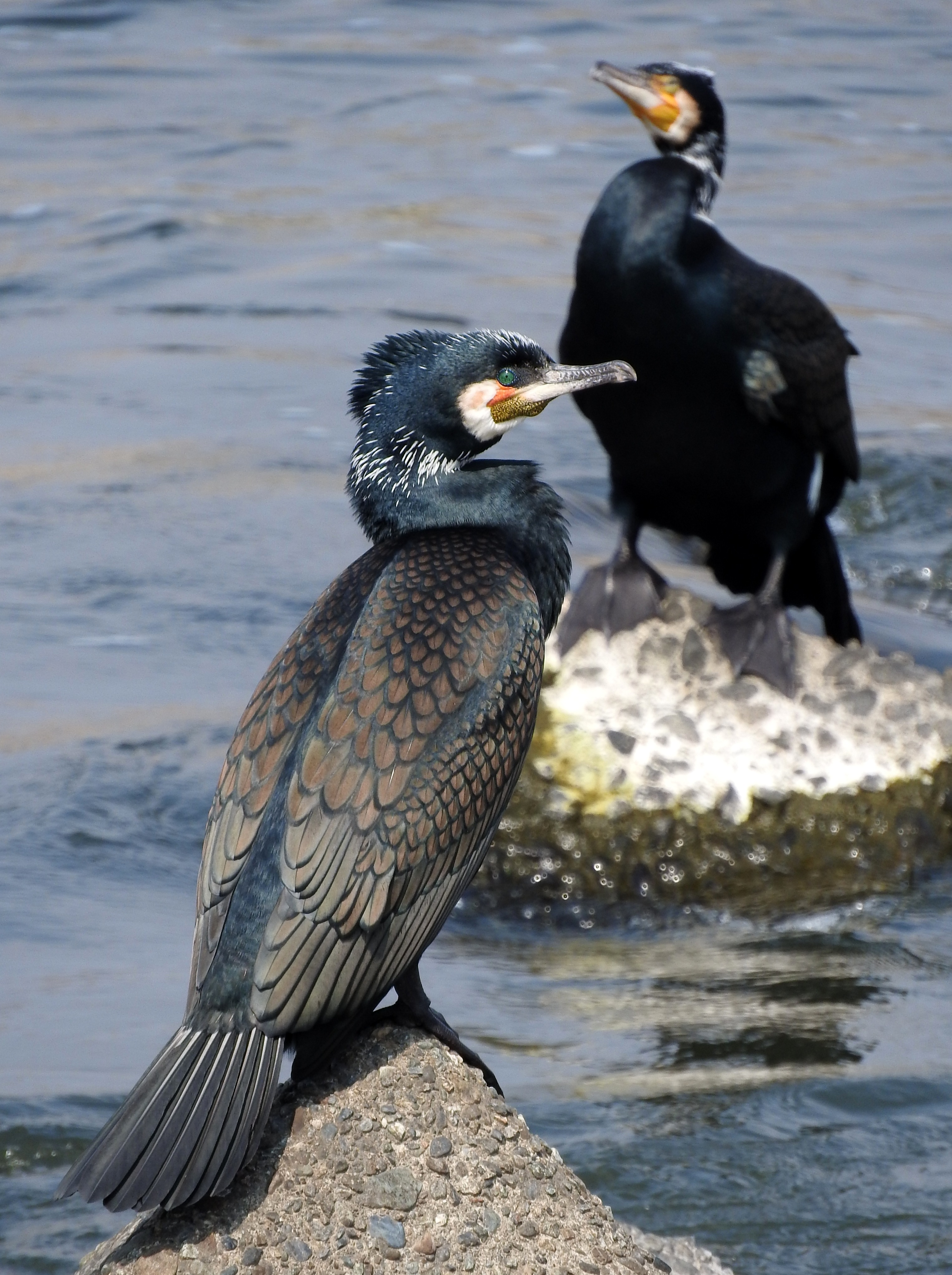
A pair of great cormorants at the river

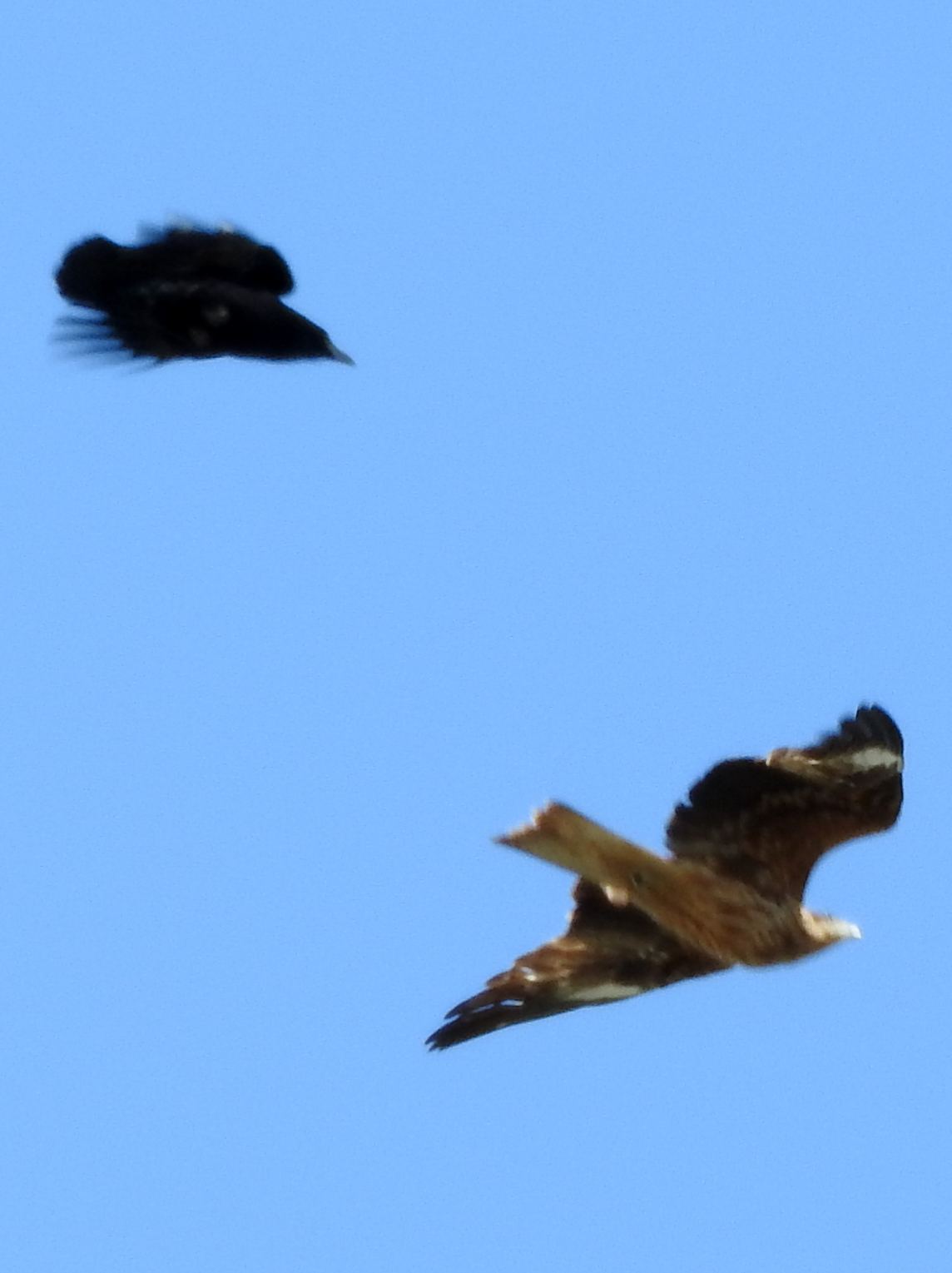
A crow chasing a black kite over the river

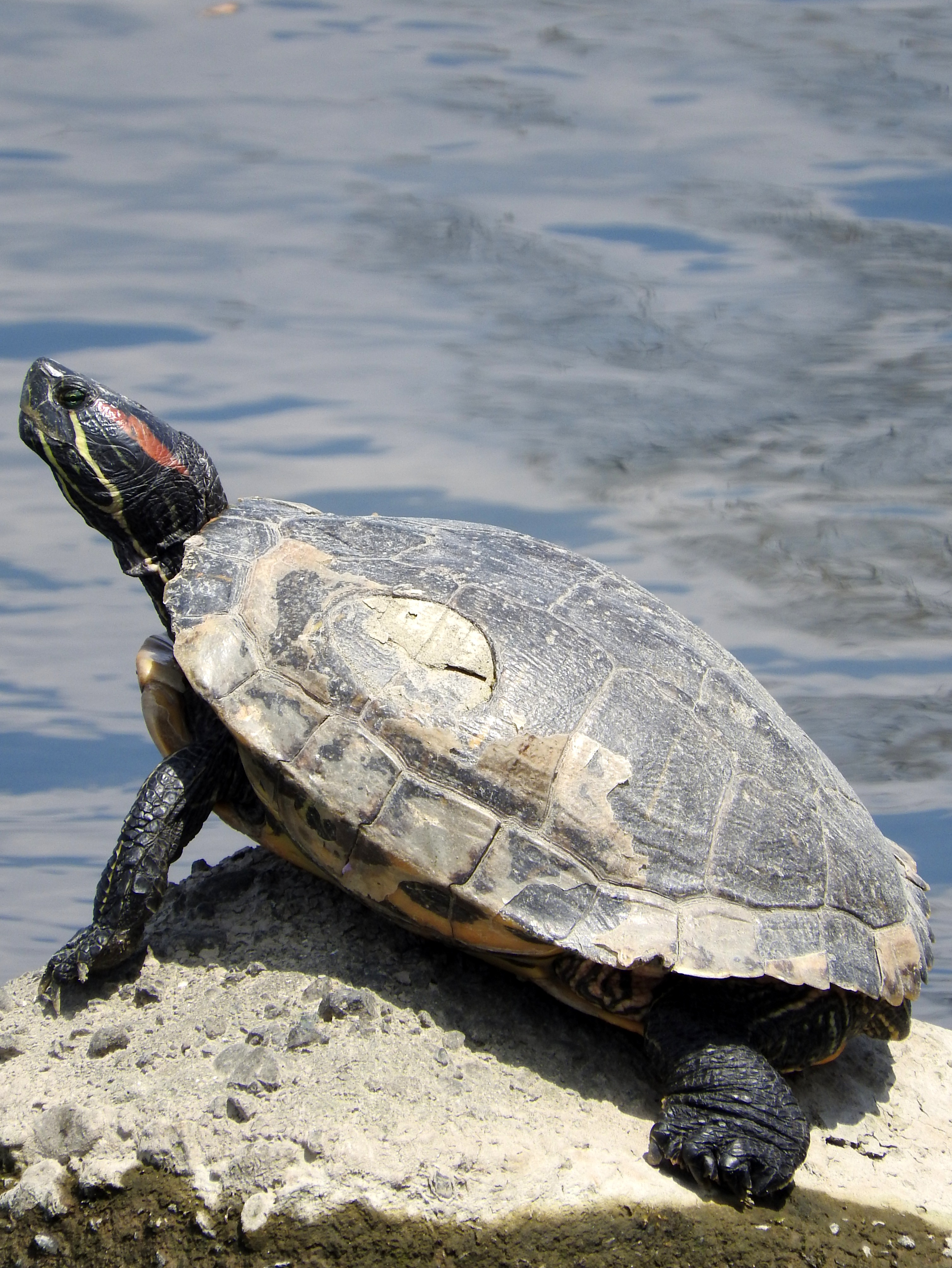
A red-eared slider turtle at the river

== Man-made lakes ==
- Lake Okutama
- Shiromaru Lake

== In popular culture and media ==
The live-action outdoor night scenes from the opening FMV sequence of the original Resident Evil video game (known in Japan as "BIOHAZARD", where initial development and filming of all FMV scenes took place) were filmed near a riverbank of Tama, in heavily grassed parts of the shore's premises, roughly 20 kilometers (12.4 miles) away from Tokyo, sometime in late August/early September 1995. Filming at Tama was done in roughly 12 hours and lasted from 17:00 to 05:00 the next day. Glen Snyder's photobook "Clouds" captures life on the banks of the Tama river.

The asteroid 1089 Tama was named after the Tama River.

The river was featured heavily in the manga and anime series 365 Days to the Wedding.

== See also ==
- Japanese cruiser Tama
- Aki River – a tributary of the Tama
