= Mount Mitake (Tokyo) =

Mountain near Tokyo, Japan

Coordinates: 35°47′N 139°09′E

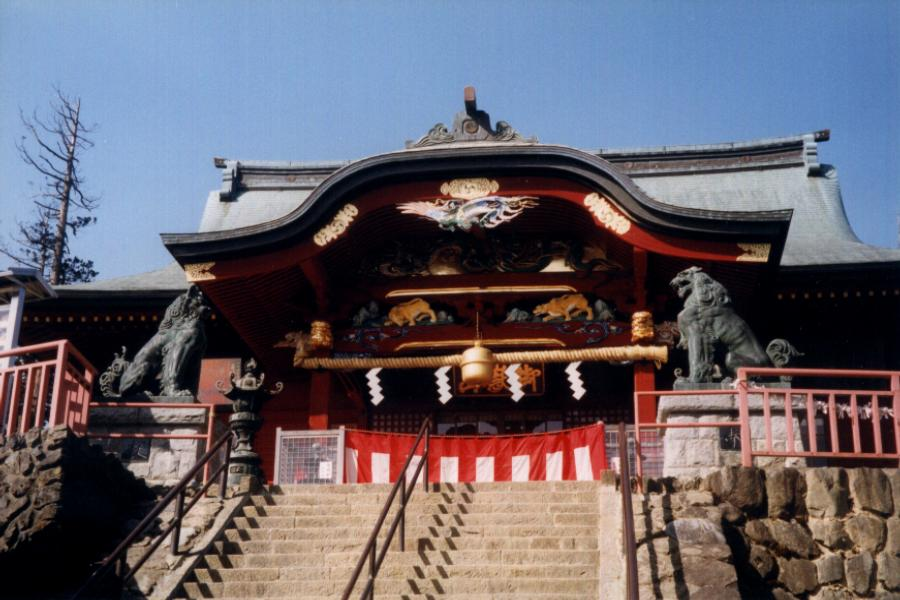
The shrine on Mount Mitake

Mount Mitake (御岳山, Mitake-san) is a mountain in the Chichibu Tama Kai National Park near Tokyo, Japan. It stands 929 m (3,048 ft) tall. On the mountain is a Shinto shrine where practices such as Futomani divination take place.

It is one of the many highlights of the Chichibu Tama Kai National Park, which covers more than 1,250 km^{2} (483 mi^{2}) of forested mountains, hills, gorges and some rural towns in the prefectures of Yamanashi, Saitama, Nagano and Tokyo.

The trip from Tokyo's Shinjuku Station to Mitake Station on the Ōme Line takes about 95 minutes.

A shuttle bus, located 50 meters to the left of Mitake Station, travels to Takimoto village every half-hour between 07:30 to 18:00. From Takimoto village, the Mitake-Tozan Railway cable car operates every half-hour between 07:30 to 18:30 and leads to Mitake village at its top. Mitake summit and the Musashi-Mitake Shrine (武蔵御嶽神社 (Musashi Mitake Jinja)) can then be reached by trail—approximately 1000 meters. Hikers heading to Mount Odake (Tokyo) often start here.

Many hikers access the mountain via Kori Station (two stops past Mitake Station from Ome). There is a hiking trail that takes approximately two and half hours to reach the summit, which passes Otsukayama (920 metres).

There is also a festival every year on May 8.
