= Mitake rock climbing =

The rock climbing (bouldering) in Mitake is centered on the riverbed of Tama River

Some of Japan's famous boulder problems can be found in the Mitake area. On boulders such as "Ninja Rock" and "Deadend"

The rock consists of limestone/ chert. With boulders between a few feet till 20 feet tall. The boulders are graded according to the Japanese Dankyu grading system. With problems ranging between Fb3 and Fb8B.

In 2001 Dai Koyamada made the first ascent of Kanimushi 8B, the hardest problem in Mitake.

Mitake is easily accessed by train from Tokyo. Taking the Ome line from Tachikawa station to Mitake Station (Tokyo)
