= Mitake Tozan Railway =

Japanese transport company

Coordinates: 35°47′32.6″N 139°9′28.6″E

Mitake Tozan Railway Co., Ltd
- Native name: 御岳登山鉄道株式会社
- Company type: Kabushiki gaisha
- Industry: Rail transport
- Founded: 20 November 1927
- Headquarters: Ōme, Tokyo, Japan
- Services: Mitake Tozan Funicular; Mitakesan Chairlift
- Owner: Keio Corporation (41.68%); Musashi Mitake Shrine (23.50%)
- Website: www.mitaketozan.co.jp

The Mitake Tozan Railway (御岳登山鉄道, Mitake Tozan Tetsudō; "Mitake Mountain Railway") is a Japanese transport company in Ōme, Tokyo. It belongs to the Keio Group. The company operates a funicular line and a chairlift, both in Mount Mitake. The company was founded in 1927.

== Funicular line ==
Mitake Tozan Funicular
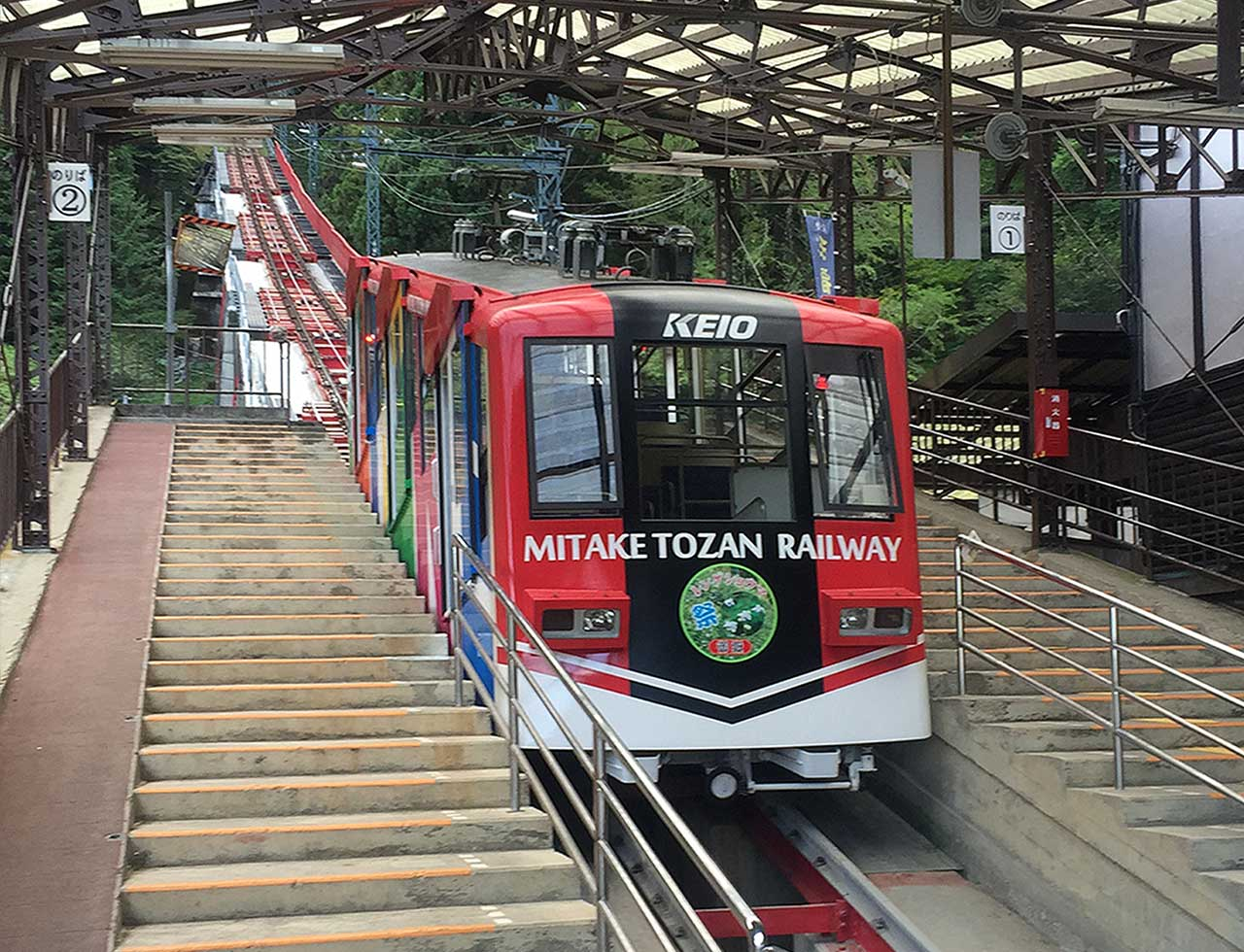

Overview
- Native name: 御岳登山ケブル
- Termini: Takimoto Station (elevation: 407.6m); Mitakesan Station (elevation: 831.0m)
- Stations: 2

Service
- Type: Funicular

Technical
- Line length: 1.0 km (0.62 mi)
- Track gauge: 1,049mm

The funicular line is commonly known as Mitake Tozan Cable (御岳登山ケーブル, Mitake Tozan Kēburu). The difference in elevation between the two stations is 424 m (1,390 ft). Construction began in 1930, and operation started in 1935. In 1944, it was suspended due to World War II and partially scrapped for material, with operation only starting again in 1951.

In 1991, the gauge was changed from the original 1,067mm to 1,049mm because the rail profile was increased.

Three generations of vehicles have been used on the route. The original Ko-1 type (コー1系) was replaced with the Ko-2 type (コー2系) in 1968, which was in turn replaced in 2008.

Pasmo and Suica IC cards are accepted as payment methods.

=== Mitakesan Station ===
This station is the ground station. It is made up of a single track, two platforms and a kiosk which is located outside of the ticket hall.

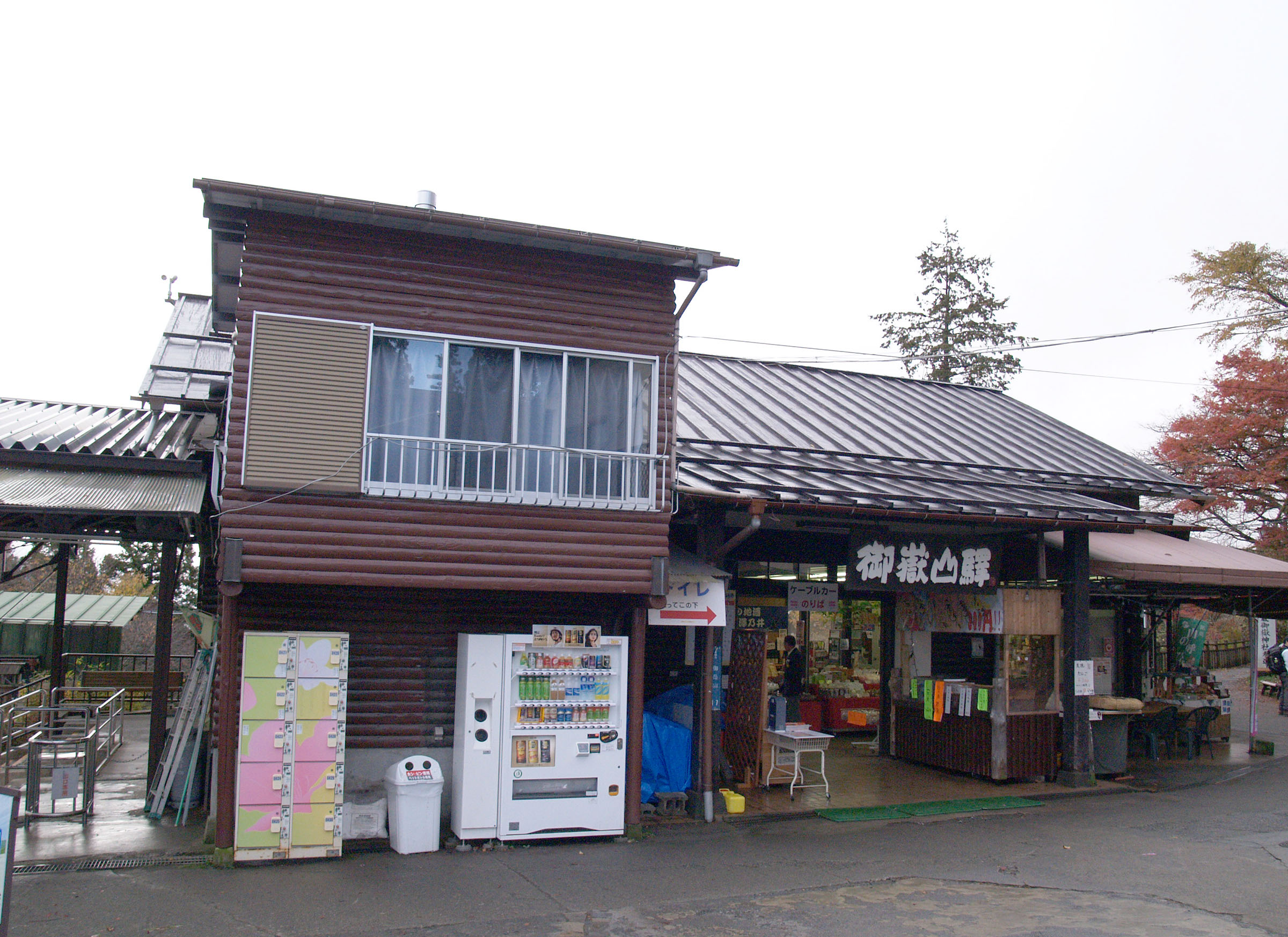
Mitakesan Station

=== Takimoto Station ===
This station is the ground station. It is made up of a single track, two platforms and a kiosk which is located outside of the ticket hall. A bus stop is located near this station with bus services to Mitake Station operated by Nishi Tokyo Bus which is owned by Keio Group.

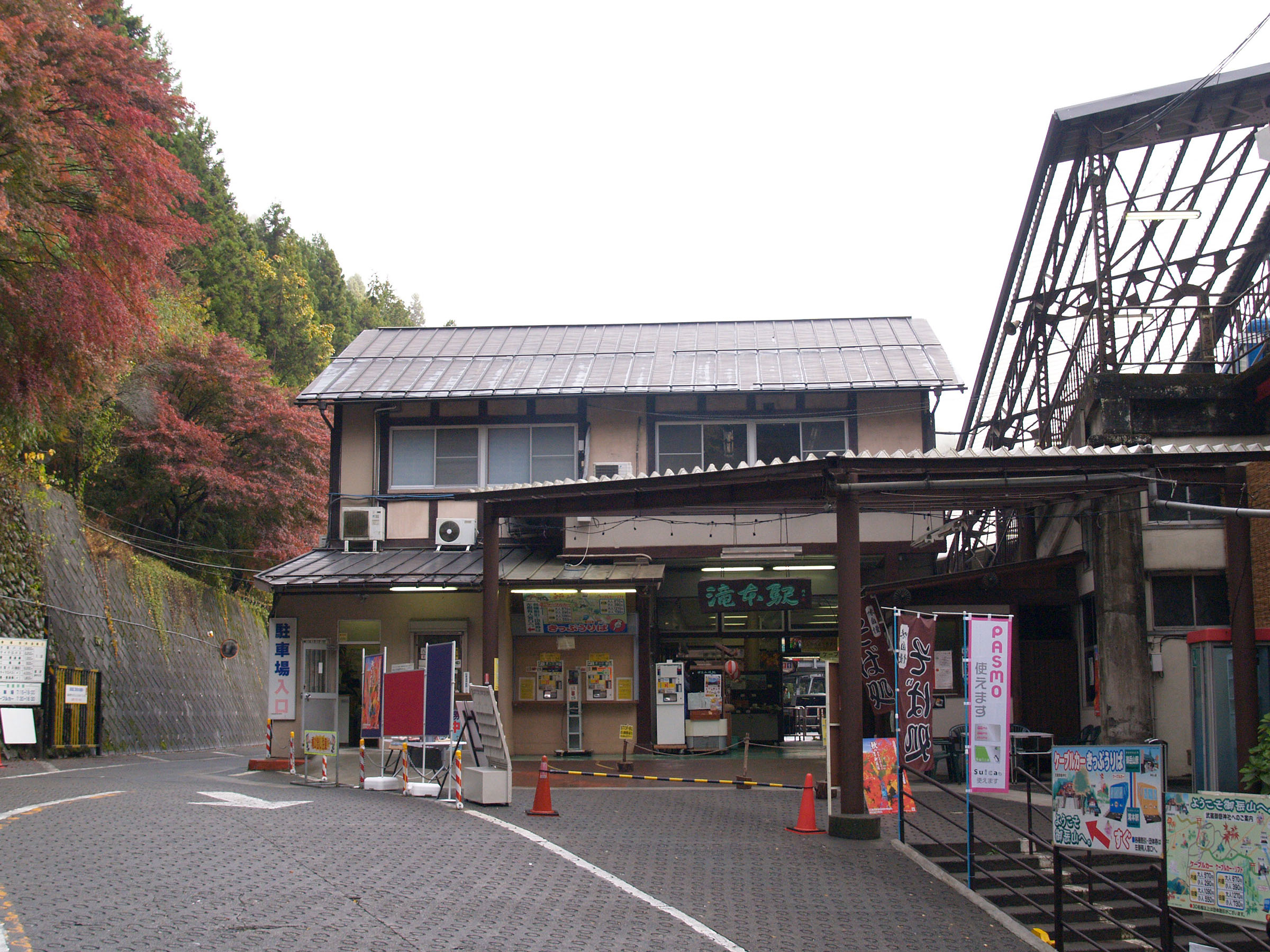
Takimoto Station

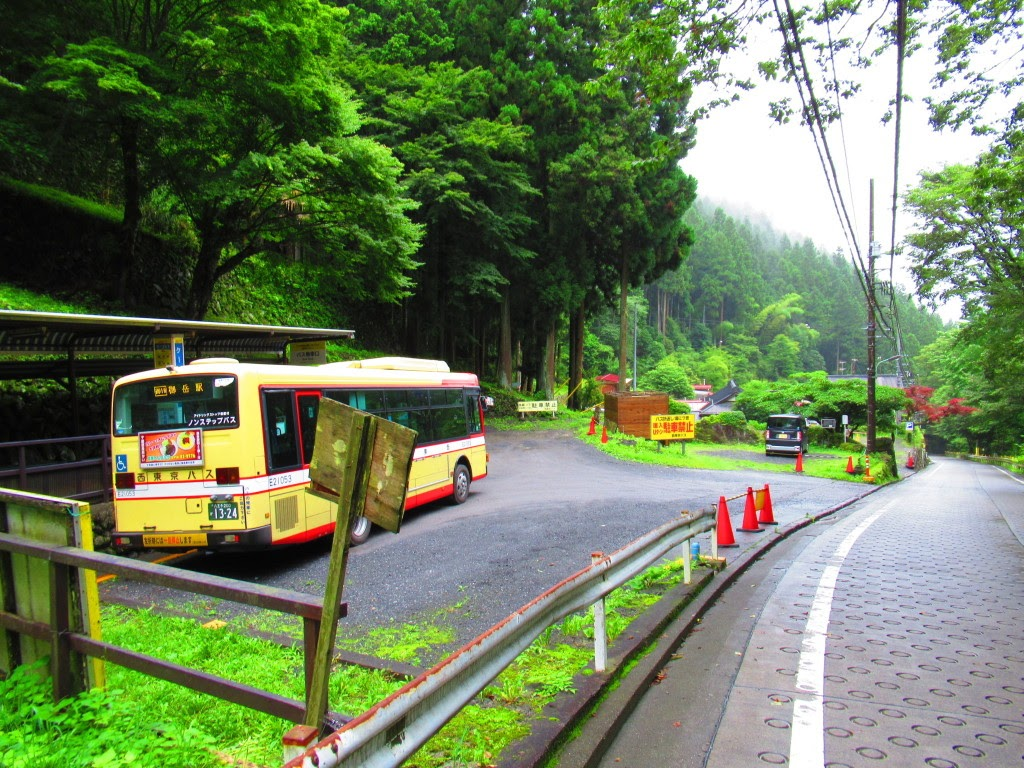
Bus stop

== Chairlift ==
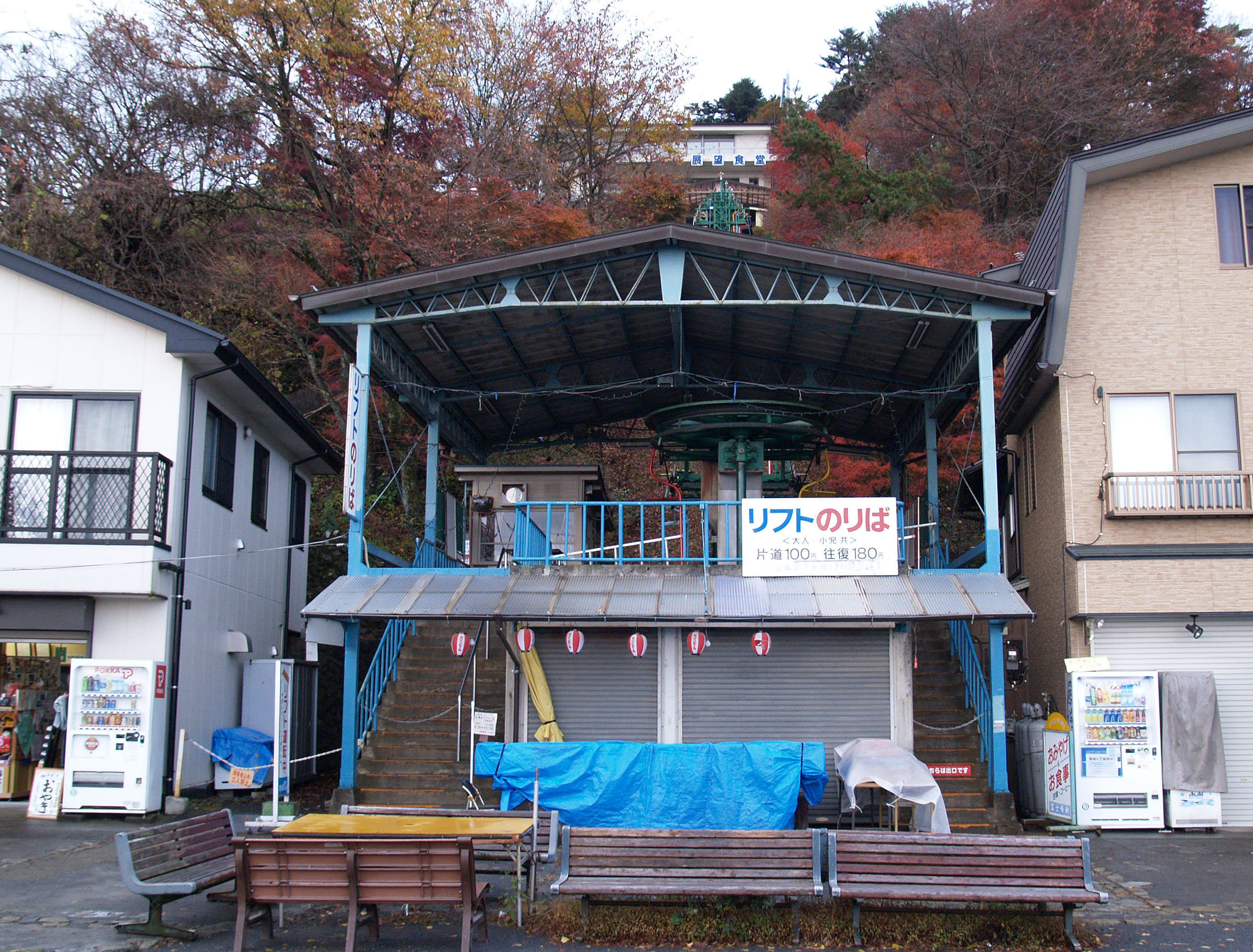
Mitake Daira station

The company also operates a chairlift. Its stations are called Mitake Daira (immediately next to the funicular's Mitake station) and Daitenbōdai and it was opened in 1958.

== See also ==
- List of funicular railways
- List of railway companies in Japan
- List of railway lines in Japan
