= Higashi-Nakagami Station =

Railway station in Akishima, Tokyo, Japan

JC52 Higashi-Nakagami Station 東中神駅
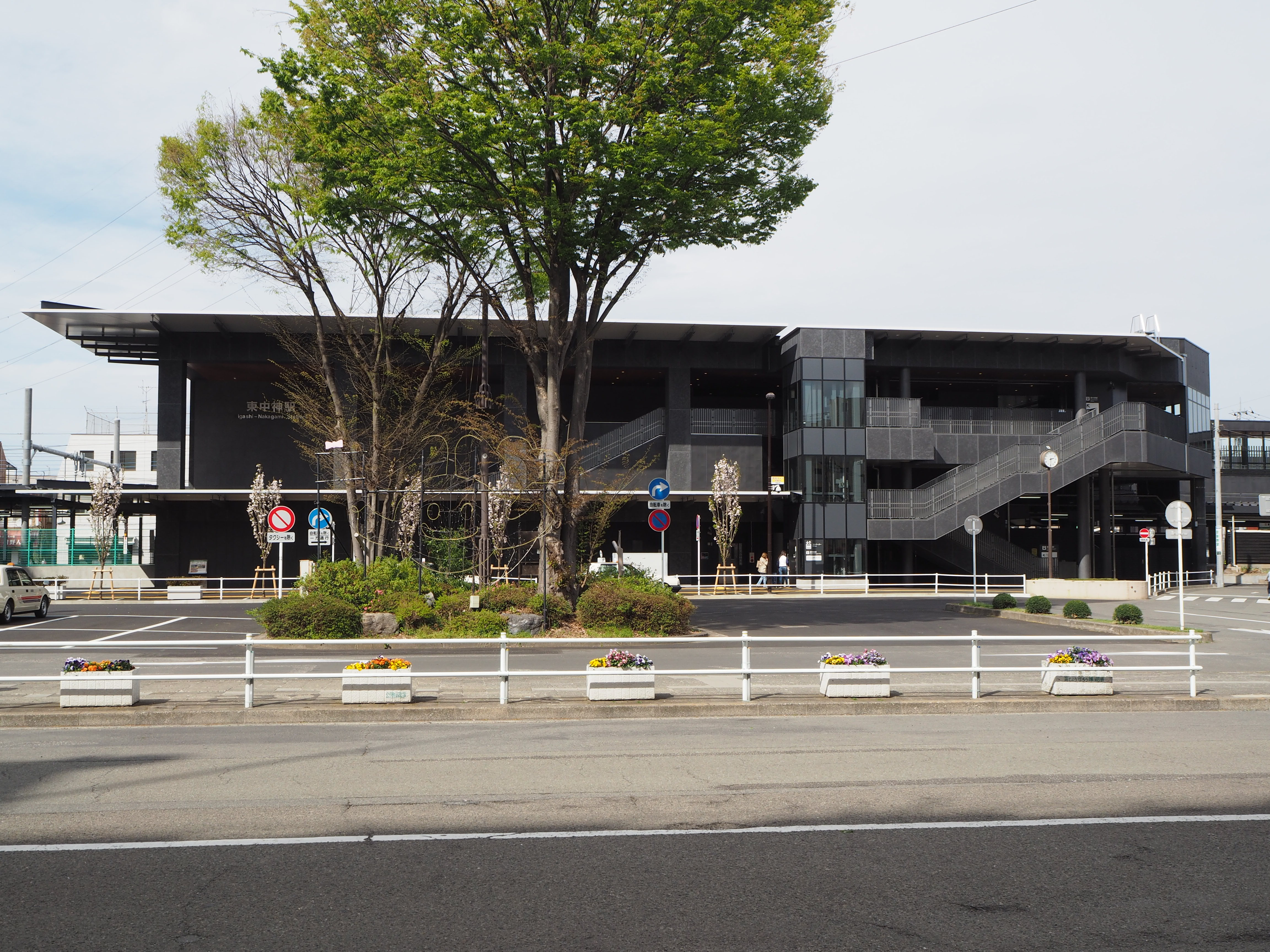
- Higashi-Nakagami Station, in April 2018

General information
- Location: 1-7-1 Tamagawa-cho, Akishima-shi, Tokyo 196-0034; Japan
- Coordinates: 35°42′22.8204″N 139°23′3.02″E
- Operator: JR East
- Line: Ōme Line
- Distance: 2.7 from Tachikawa
- Platforms: 2 side platforms
- Tracks: 2

Other information
- Status: Staffed
- Station code: JC52
- Website: Official website

History
- Opened: 1 July 1942
- Rebuilt: 2018

Passengers
- FY2019: 7,186

Services
Preceding station	JR East	Following station
Nakagami One-way operation	Ōme Line Commuter Special Rapid	Nishi-Tachikawa JC51 towards Tachikawa
Nakagami JC53 towards Ōme	Ōme Line Ōme Special Rapid	Nishi-Tachikawa JC51 towards Tachikawa
Nakagami JC53 towards Ōme	Ōme Line Commuter Rapid	Nishi-Tachikawa One-way operation
Nakagami JC53 towards Oku-Tama	Ōme Line Rapid Local	Nishi-Tachikawa JC51 towards Tachikawa
Location
- Location within Tokyo Location within Japan

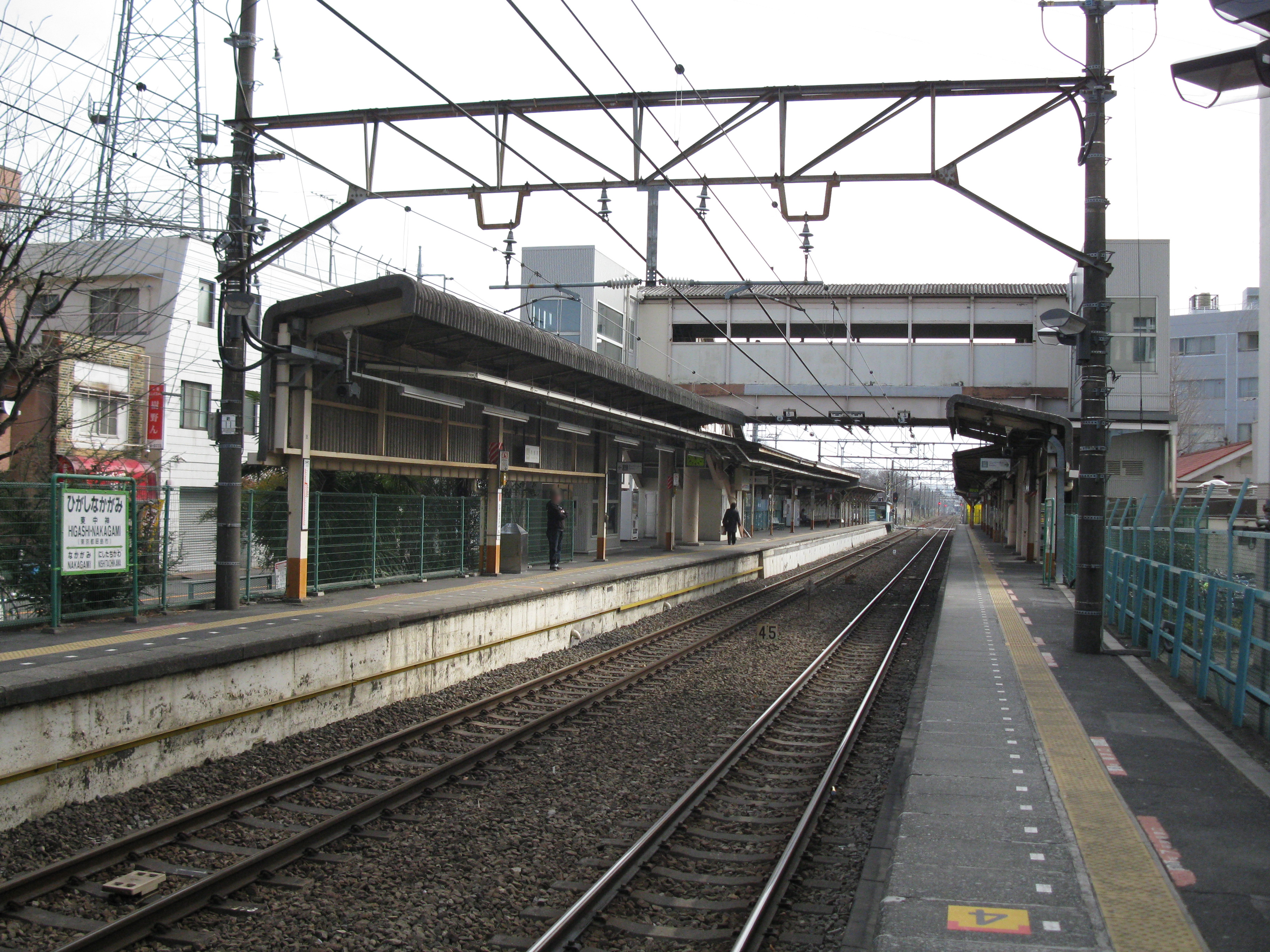
Higashi-Nakagami Station platforms in 2009

Higashi-Nakagami Station (東中神駅, Higashi-Nakagami-eki) is a passenger railway station located in the city of Akishima, Tokyo, Japan, operated by East Japan Railway Company (JR East).

== Lines ==
Higashi-Nakagami Station is served by the Ōme Line, and is located 2.7 kilometers from the starting point of the line at Tachikawa Station.

== Station layout ==
This station consists of two side platforms serving two tracks, connected by an elevated station building. The station is staffed.

=== Platforms ===
1	Ōme Line	for Ōme, Okutama, and Musashi-Itsukaichi
2	Ōme Line	for Tachikawa, Shinjuku, and Tokyo

== History ==
The station opened on 1 July 1942. With the privatization of Japanese National Railways (JNR) on 1 April 1987, the station came under the control of JR East.

== Passenger statistics ==
In fiscal 2019, the station was used by an average of 7,186 passengers daily (boarding passengers only).

The passenger figures for previous years are as shown below.

Fiscal year	Daily average
2005	7,098
2010	7,021
2015	7,079

== Surrounding area ==
- Showa Memorial Park
- Akishima Middle School

== See also ==
- List of railway stations in Japan
