= Tokyo Metropolitan Tachikawa Junior College =

Public junior college in Akishima, Tokyo, Japan

- 東京都立立川短期大学
- Type: Public
- Established: 1950
- Location: Akishima, Tokyo, Japan

Tokyo Metropolitan Tachikawa Junior College (東京都立立川短期大学, Tokyo Toritsu Tachikawa Tanki Daigaku) is a public junior college in Akishima, Tokyo, Japan.

== History ==
The predecessor of the school was founded in 1947 in Tachikawa, Tokyo.

The private junior college opened in 1950. It became a public junior college in 1959. It moved to Akishima in 1969.

The junior college closed in 2008.

== Academic departments ==
- Food nutrition
- Home economics

== Advanced courses ==
- Food nutrition
- Home economics

== See also ==
- Tokyo Metropolitan University
- Tokyo Metropolitan College of Commerce
