= Tokyo Metropolitan School of Shoka =

- 東京都立商科短期大学
- Type: private
- Established: 1954
- Location: Akishima, Tokyo, Japan
- Campus: Akishima, Tokyo Chūō, Tokyo
- Website: http://www.tmu.ac.jp/university/philosophy_history/history.html

Tokyo Metropolitan School of Shoka (東京都立商科短期大学, Tokyo Toritsu Shōka Tanki Daigaku) is a public junior college in Akishima, Tokyo, Japan.

== History ==
- The Junior College was set up in 1954 at Koto, Tokyo.
- 1969 new Campus was set up at Akishima, Tokyo.
- 1996 the Junior College was combined with Tokyo Metropolitan Tachikawa Junior College.

== Names of Academic department ==
- Commerce
  - Daytime course
  - Evening course
- Economics

== Advanced course ==
- No

== See also ==
- Tokyo Metropolitan University
- Tokyo Metropolitan Tachikawa Junior College
