= Nishi-Tachikawa Station =

Railway station in Tachikawa, Tokyo, Japan

JC51 Nishi-Tachikawa Station 西立川駅
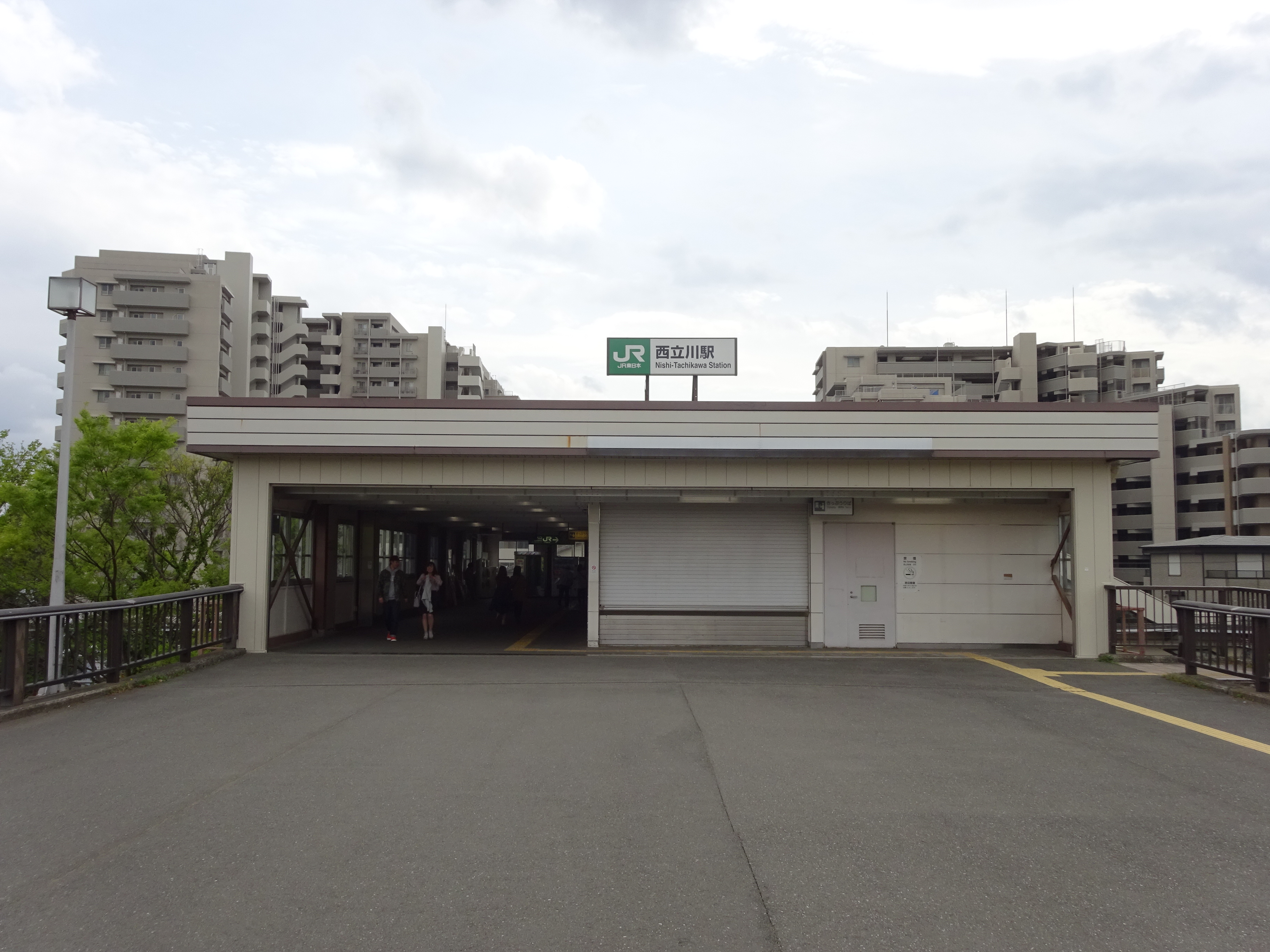
- Nishi-Tachikawa Station Park exit, April 2018

General information
- Location: 1-36 Fujimi-cho, Tachikawa-shi, Tokyo 190-0013; Japan
- Coordinates: 35°42′12.9239″N 139°23′37.24″E
- Operator: JR East
- Line: Ōme Line
- Distance: 1.9 km from Tachikawa
- Platforms: 1 island platform
- Tracks: 2

Other information
- Status: Staffed
- Website: Official website

History
- Opened: 15 November 1931

Passengers
- FY2019: 6,661

Services
Preceding station	JR East	Following station
Higashi-Nakagami One-way operation	Ōme Line Commuter Special Rapid	Tachikawa JC19 Terminus
Higashi-Nakagami JC52 towards Ōme	Ōme Line Ōme Special Rapid	Tachikawa JC19 Terminus
Higashi-Nakagami JC52 towards Ōme	Ōme Line Commuter Rapid	Tachikawa One-way operation
Higashi-Nakagami JC52 towards Oku-Tama	Ōme Line Rapid Local	Tachikawa JC19 Terminus
Location
- Location within Tokyo Location within Japan

Nishi-Tachikawa Station (西立川駅, Nishi-Tachikawa-eki) is a passenger railway station located in the city of Tachikawa, Tokyo, Japan, operated by East Japan Railway Company (JR East).

== Lines ==
Nishi-Tachikawa Station is served by the Ōme Line, and is located 1.9 kilometers from the starting point of the line at Tachikawa Station.

== Station layout ==
This station consists of a single island platform serving two tracks. The station is staffed.

=== Platforms ===
1	Ōme Line	for Ōme, Okutama, and Musashi-Itsukaichi
2	Ōme Line	for Tachikawa, Shinjuku, and Tokyo

== History ==
Nishi-Tachikawa Station opened on 15 November 1931. With the privatization of Japanese National Railways (JNR) on 1 April 1987, the station came under the control of JR East.

== Passenger statistics ==
In fiscal 2019, the station was used by an average of 6,661 passengers daily (boarding passengers only).

== Surrounding area ==
- Showa Memorial Park

== See also ==
- List of railway stations in Japan
