= Nakagami Station =

Railway station in Akishima, Tokyo, Japan

JC53 Nakagami Station 中神駅
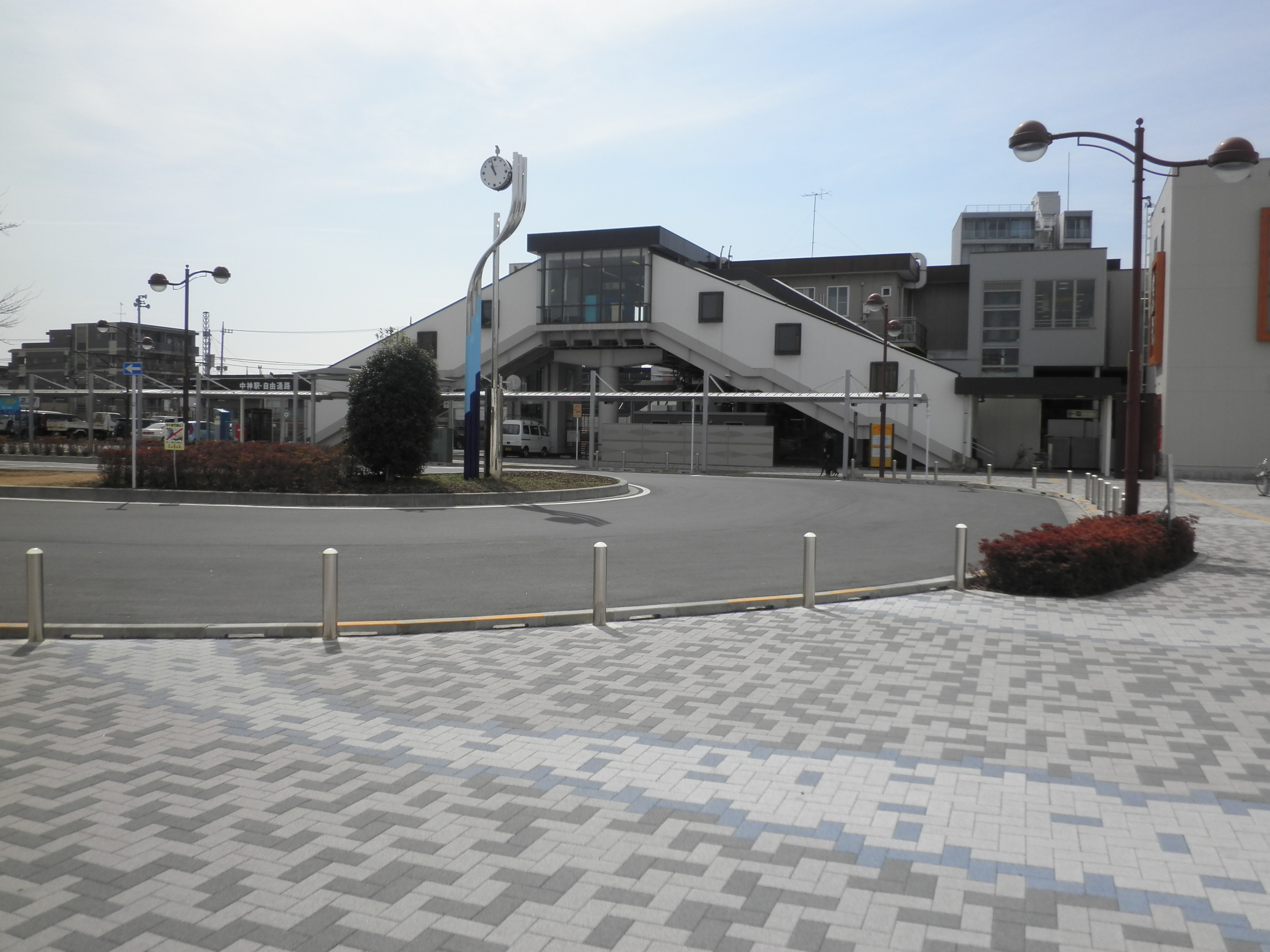
- Nakagami Station north exit, in March 2011

General information
- Location: 1-1-9 Asahi-machi, Akishima-shi, Tokyo 196-0022; Japan
- Coordinates: 35°42′32.6124″N 139°22′32.92″E
- Operator: JR East
- Line: Ōme Line
- Distance: 3.6 from Tachikawa
- Platforms: 2 side platforms
- Tracks: 2

Other information
- Status: Staffed
- Station code: JC53
- Website: Official website

History
- Opened: 18 July 1908

Passengers
- FY2019: 11,447

Services
Preceding station	JR East	Following station
Akishima One-way operation	Ōme Line Commuter Special Rapid	Higashi-Nakagami JC52 towards Tachikawa
Akishima JC54 towards Ōme	Ōme Line Ōme Special Rapid	Higashi-Nakagami JC52 towards Tachikawa
Akishima JC54 towards Ōme	Ōme Line Commuter Rapid	Higashi-Nakagami One-way operation
Akishima JC54 towards Oku-Tama	Ōme Line Rapid Local	Higashi-Nakagami JC52 towards Tachikawa
Location
- Location within Tokyo Location within Japan

Nakagami Station (中神駅, Nakagami-eki) is a passenger railway station located in the city of Akishima, Tokyo, Japan, operated by East Japan Railway Company (JR East).

== Lines ==
Nakagami Station is served by the Ōme Line, and is located 3.6 kilometers from the starting point of the line at Tachikawa Station.

== Station layout ==
This station consists of two opposed side platforms serving two tracks, connected to the station building by a footbridge. The station is staffed.

=== Platforms ===
1	Ōme Line	for Ōme, Okutama, and Musashi-Itsukaichi
2	Ōme Line	for Tachikawa, Shinjuku, and Tokyo

== History ==
The station opened on 18 July 1908 as a station on the Ōme Electric Railway. The line was nationalized on 1 April 1944. With the privatization of Japanese National Railways (JNR) on 1 April 1987, the station came under the control of JR East.

== Passenger statistics ==
In fiscal 2019, the station was used by an average of 11,447 passengers daily (boarding passengers only).

The passenger figures for previous years are as shown below.

Fiscal year	Daily average
2005	9,822
2010	10,140
2015	10,895

== Surrounding area ==
- Nakagami Station Shopping District

== See also ==
- List of railway stations in Japan
