= Akishima Station =

Railway station in Akishima, Tokyo, Japan

JC54 Akishima Station 昭島駅
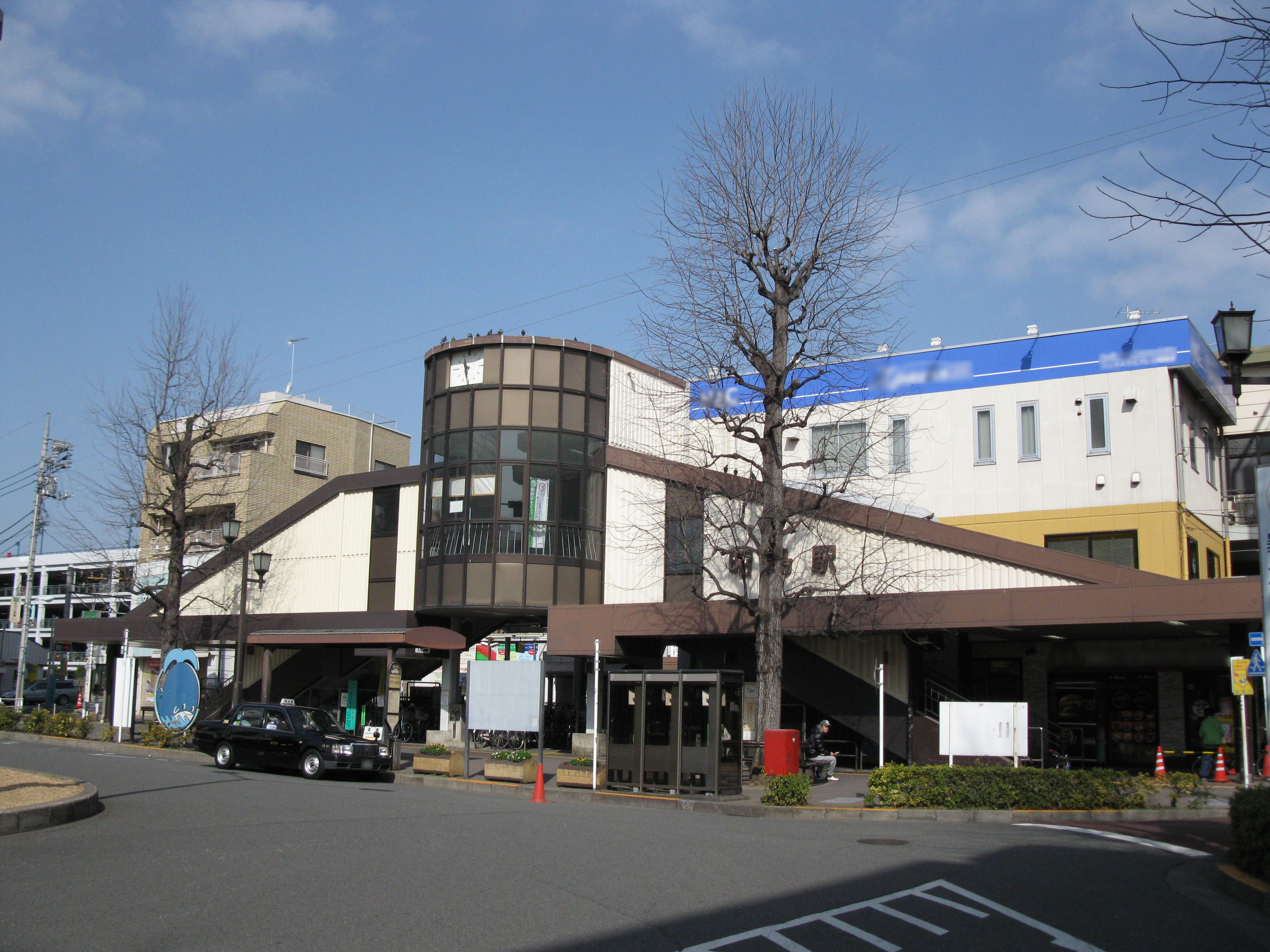
- Akishima Station south entrance in February 2009

General information
- Location: 2 Shōwa-chō, Akishima-shi, Tokyo 196-0015; Japan
- Coordinates: 35°42′48.7548″N 139°21′39.2544″E
- Operator: JR East
- Line: Ōme Line
- Distance: 5.0 km from Tachikawa
- Platforms: 1 island platform
- Tracks: 2

Other information
- Status: Staffed
- Station code: JC54
- Website: Official website

History
- Opened: 25 December 1938
- Former names: Shōwa-mae Station (to 1959)

Passengers
- 25,970

Services
Preceding station	JR East	Following station
Haijima One-way operation	Ōme Line Commuter Special Rapid	Nakagami JC53 towards Tachikawa
Haijima JC55 towards Ōme	Ōme Line Ōme Special Rapid	Nakagami JC53 towards Tachikawa
Haijima JC55 towards Ōme	Ōme Line Commuter Rapid	Nakagami One-way operation
Haijima JC55 towards Oku-Tama	Ōme Line Rapid Local	Nakagami JC53 towards Tachikawa
Location
- Location within Tokyo Location within Japan

Akishima Station (昭島駅, Akishima-eki) is a passenger railway station located in the city of Akishima, Tokyo, Japan, operated by East Japan Railway Company (JR East).

== Lines ==
Akishima Station is served by the Ōme Line from Tachikawa to Ōme, with direct services to and from Tokyo via the Chūō Line (Rapid). It is located 5.0 kilometers from the starting point of the line at Tachikawa Station.

== Station layout ==
The station consists of a single island platform serving two tracks, with an elevated station building located above the tracks and platforms. The station is staffed.

=== Platforms ===
1	Ōme Line	for Ōme, Okutama, and Musashi-Itsukaichi
2	Ōme Line	for Tachikawa, Shinjuku, and Tokyo

== History ==
The station opened on 25 December 1938 as Shōwa-mae Station (昭和前駅). It was renamed Akishima Station on 1 October 1959. With the privatization of Japanese National Railways (JNR) on 1 April 1987, the station came under the control of JR East.

== Passenger statistics ==
In fiscal 2019, the station was used by an average of 26,016 passengers daily (boarding passengers only).

The passenger figures for previous years are as shown below.

Fiscal year	Daily average
2005	24,170
2010	25,921
2015	26,403

== Surrounding area ==
- Showa Aircraft Industry
- Akishima Post Office

== See also ==
- List of railway stations in Japan
