= Showa Memorial Park =

Park in Tokyo, Japan

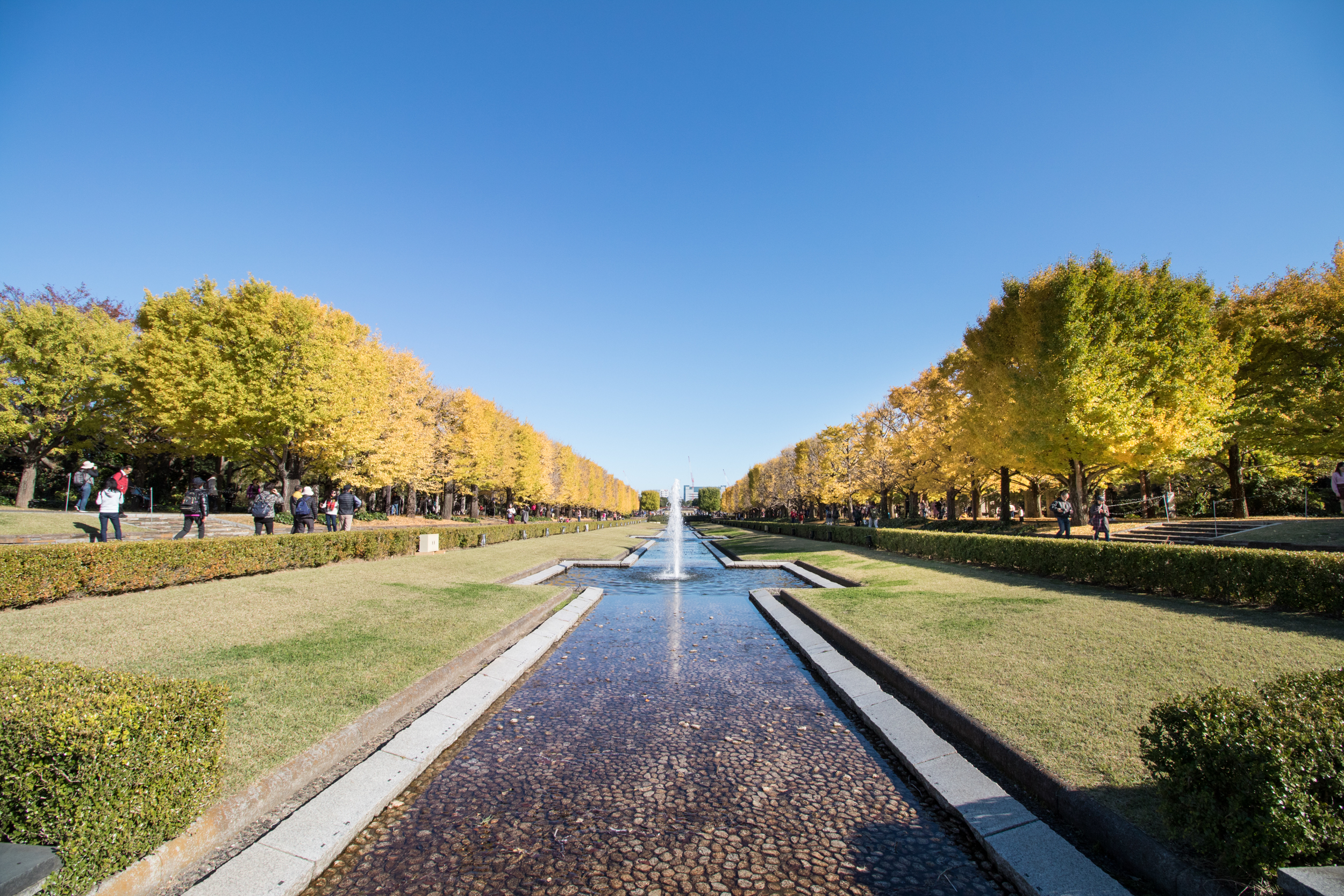
- A view of the park
- Interactive map of Showa Memorial Park
- Location: Akishima and Tachikawa, Tokyo, Japan
- Coordinates: 35°42′36″N 139°23′42″E
- Area: 165.3 ha (408 acres)
- Created: 26 October 1983
- Public transit: Nishi-Tachikawa Station

Showa Commemorative National Government Park (国営昭和記念公園, Kokuei Shōwa Kinen Kōen) is a national government park in Akishima and Tachikawa, Tokyo, Japan. It is the largest park in Tokyo, covering 165.3 ha (408 acres).

Formerly a Japanese military airbase and in the postwar era operated by the US military, Tachikawa Airfield was returned to the Japanese government in 1977. Part of the airfield remains a Japan Ground Self Defense Force base, while the remainder of the airfield was used to establish Showa Commemorative Park in 1983 as part of a project to commemorate the emperor's Golden Jubilee. There is a small museum dedicated to the Showa emperor.

Bicycles may be rented in the park, which has an 11 kilometer bike trail with parking areas at all locations. There is also an outdoor barbecue area.

In December, the park has illuminations including Christmas lighting.

The park can be best accessed from Nishi-Tachikawa Station on the JR Ome line or via a 15- to 20-minute walk from JR's Tachikawa Station or Seibu's Musashi-Sunagawa Station.

== Gallery ==
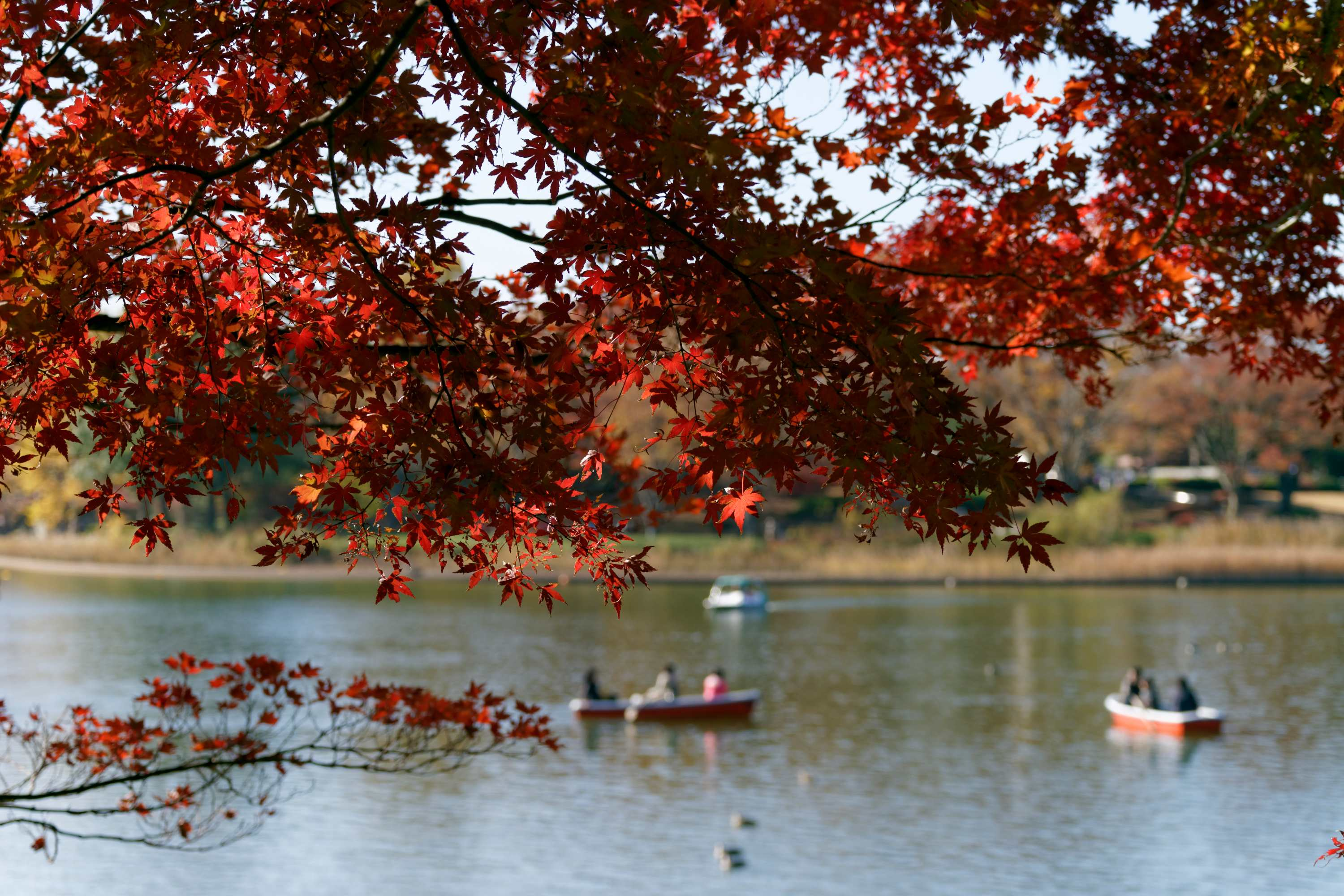

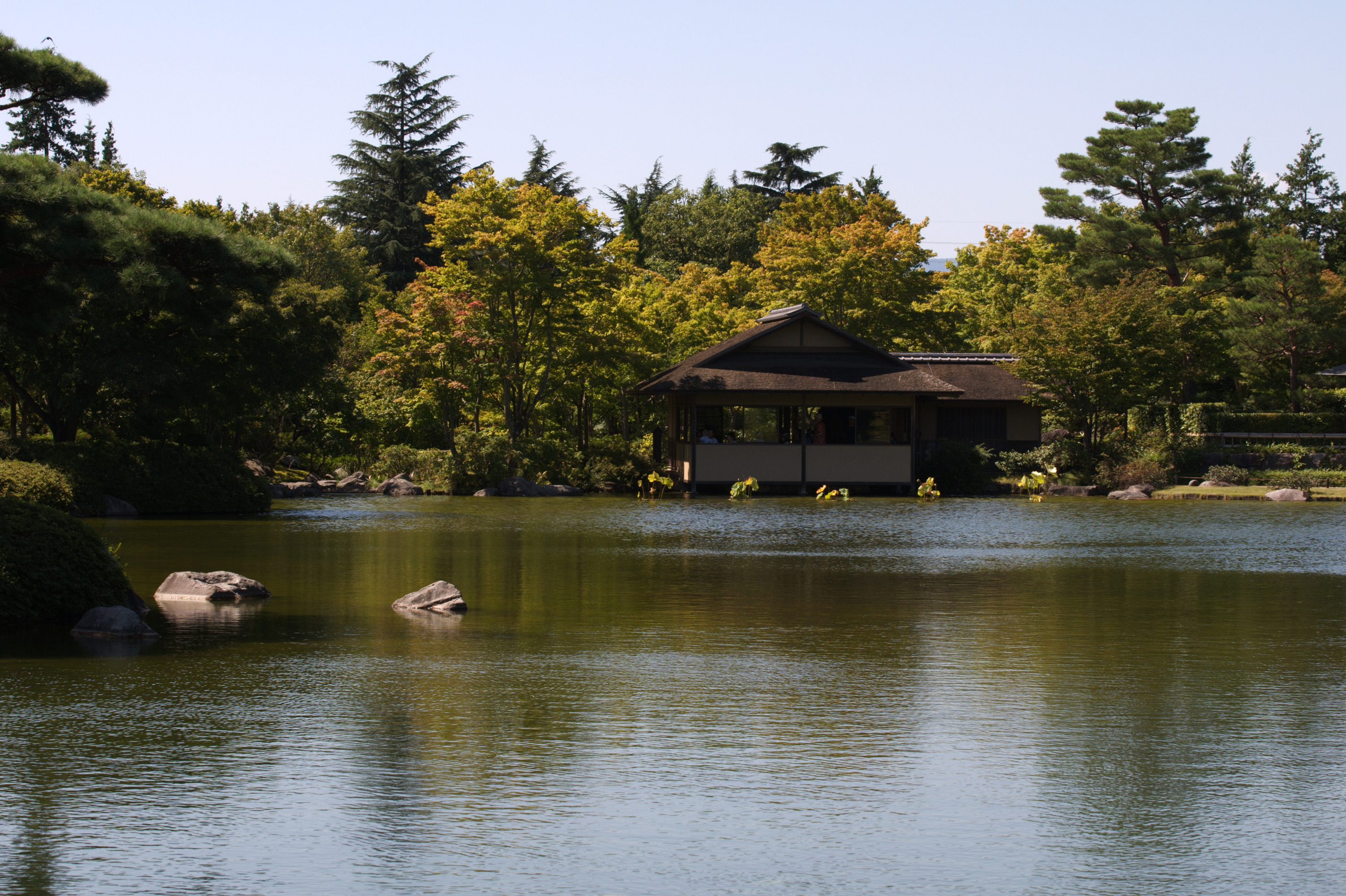
Japanese garden

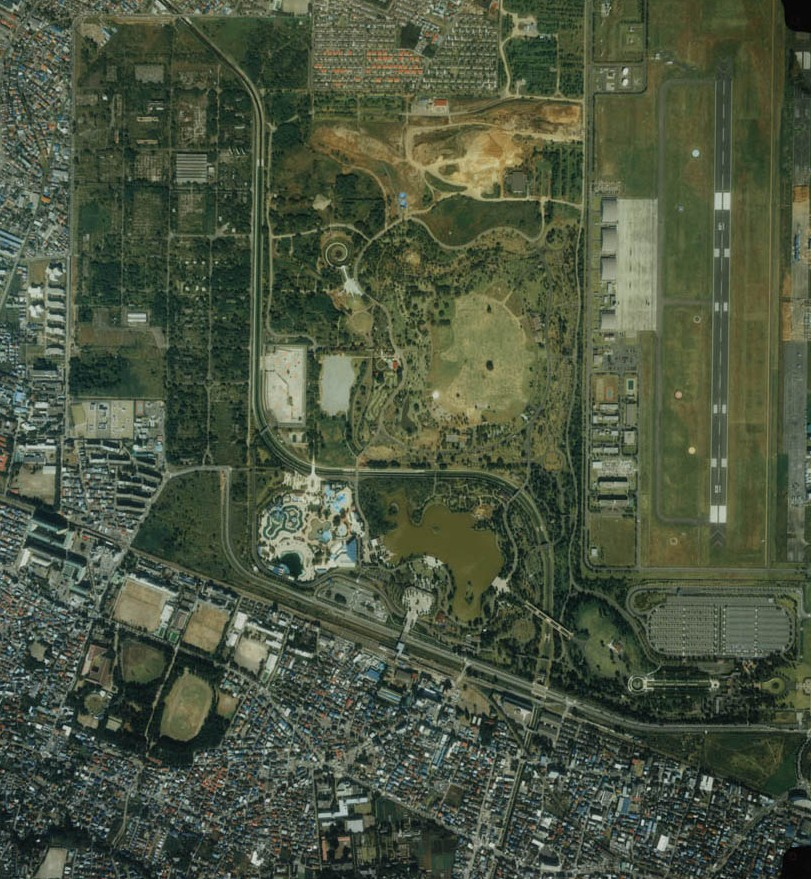
Satellite view in 1989

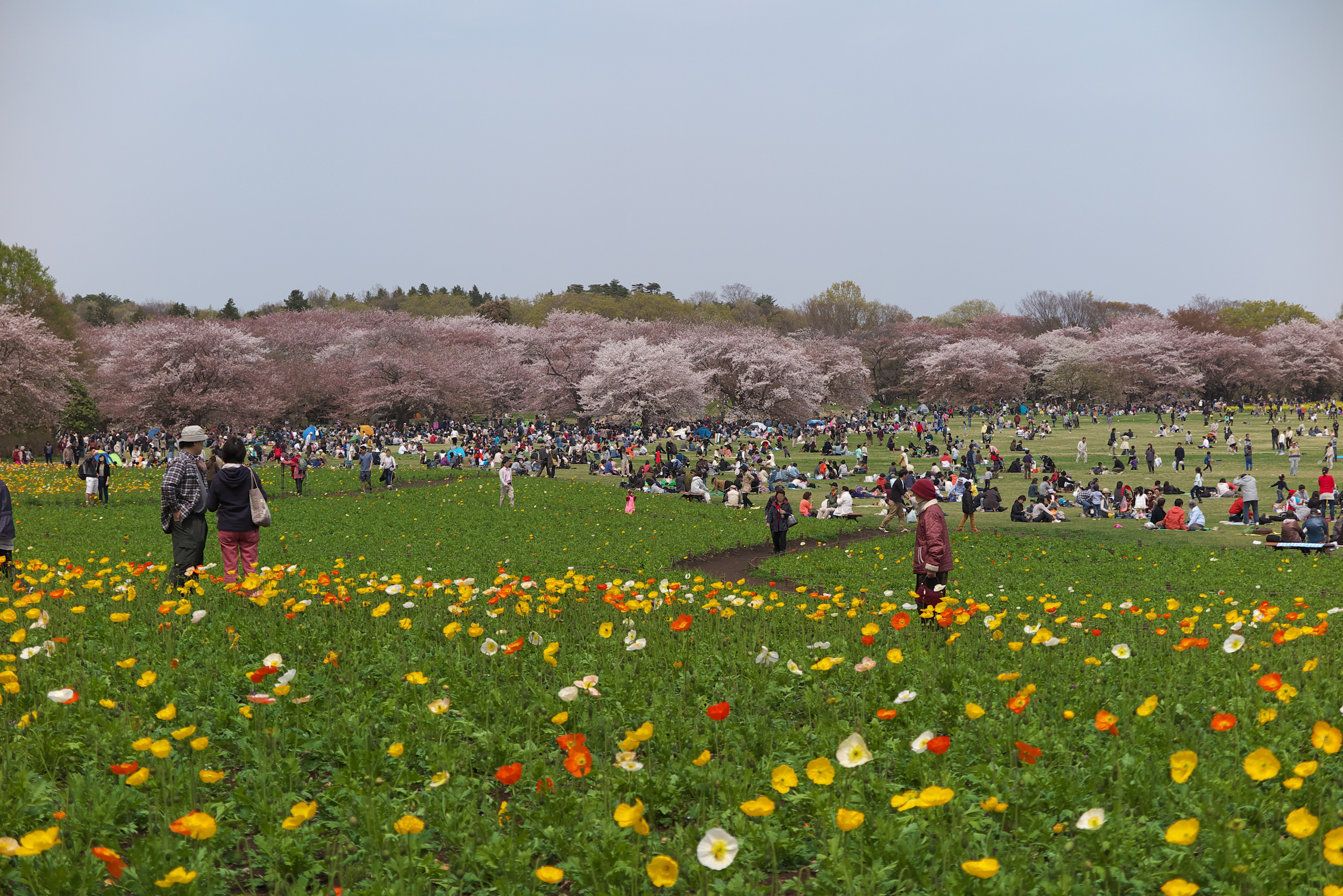

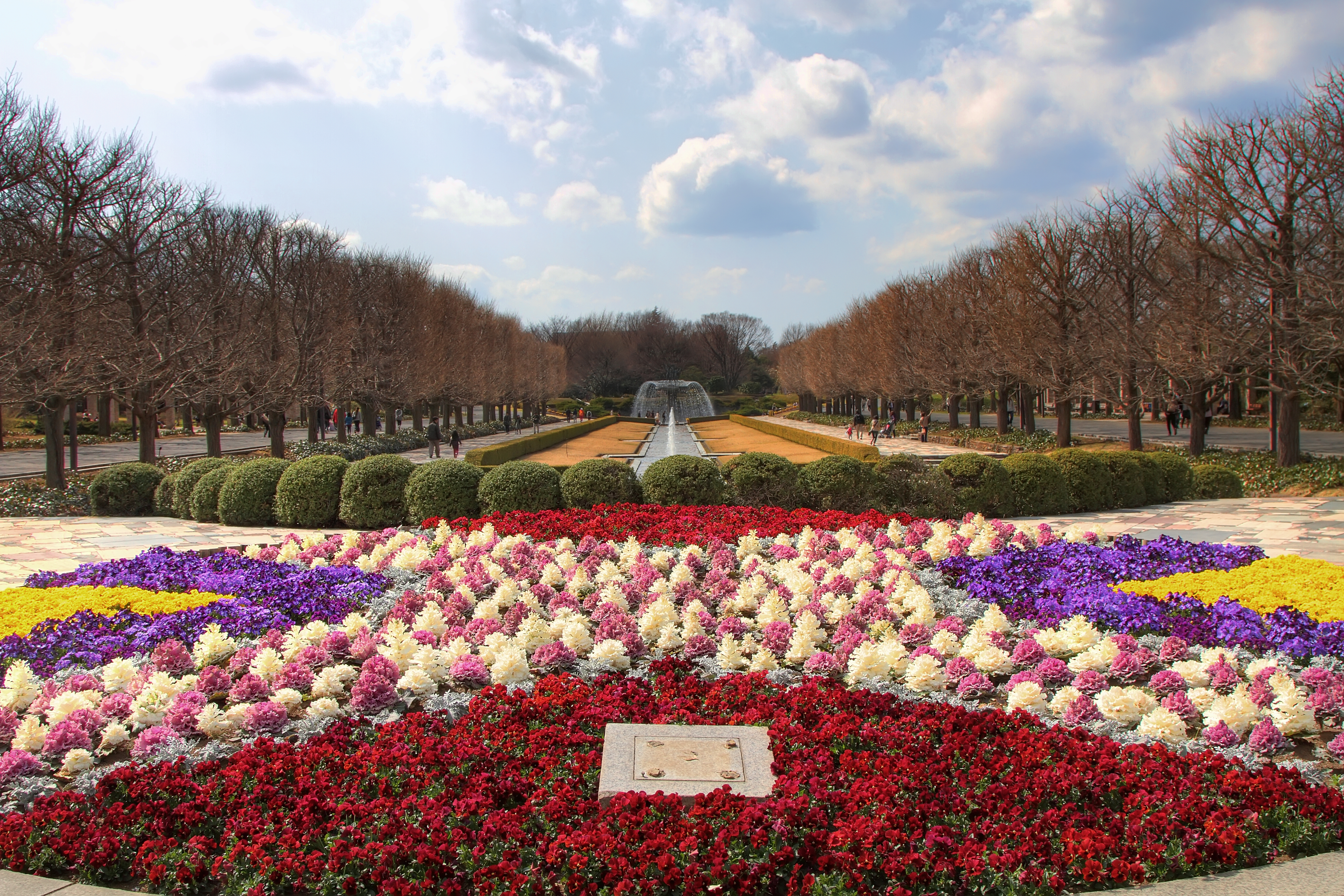

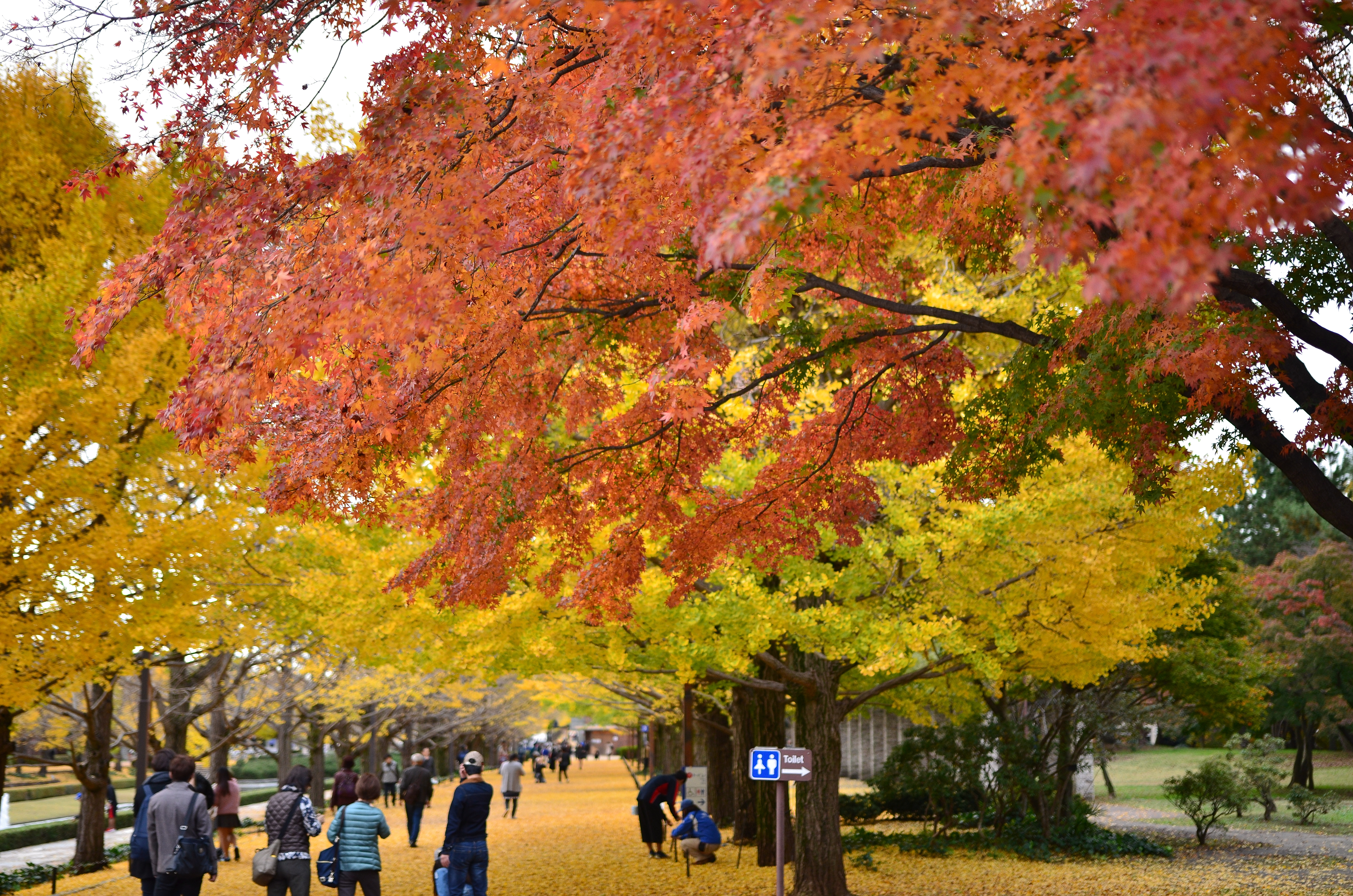

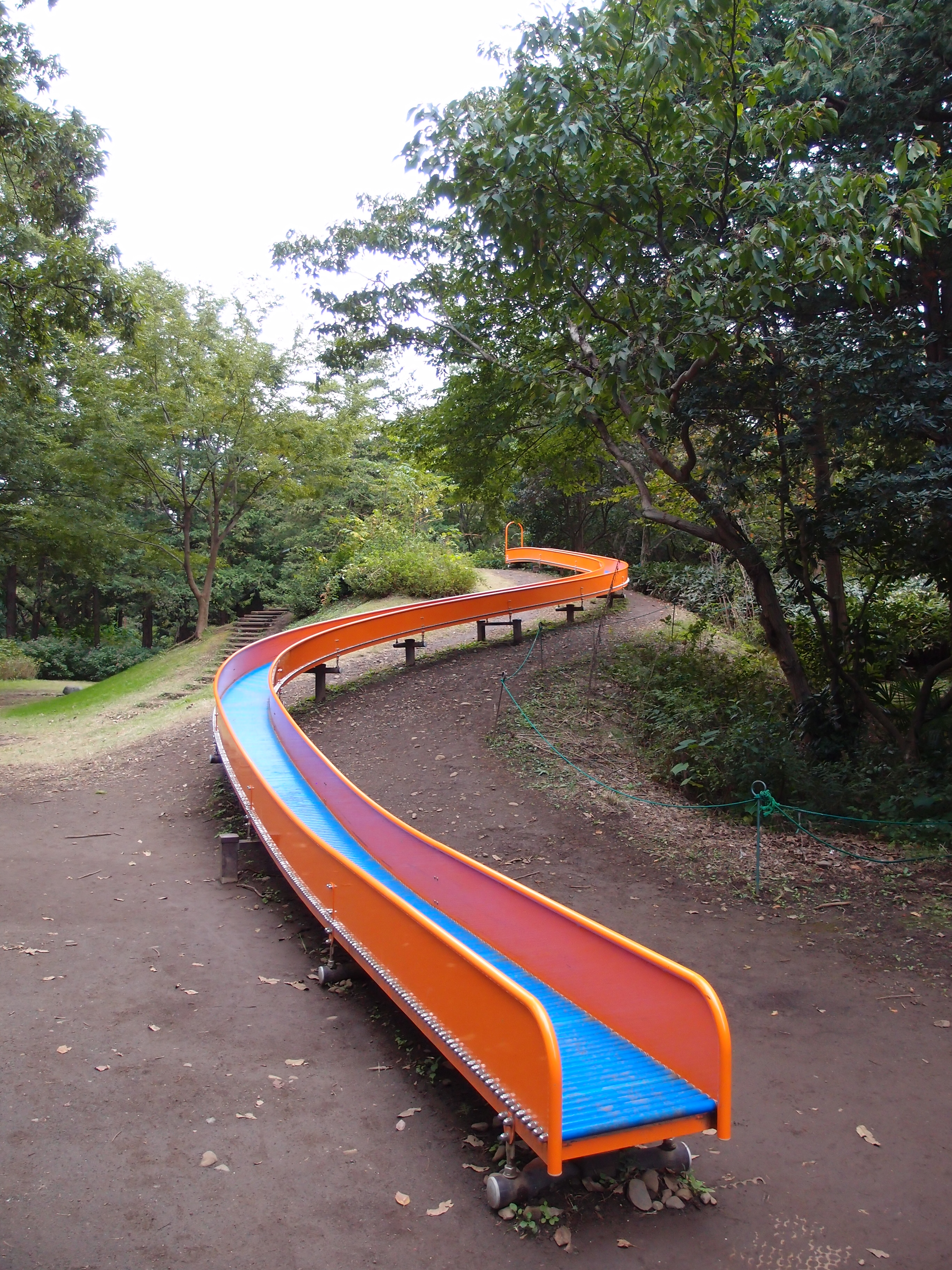

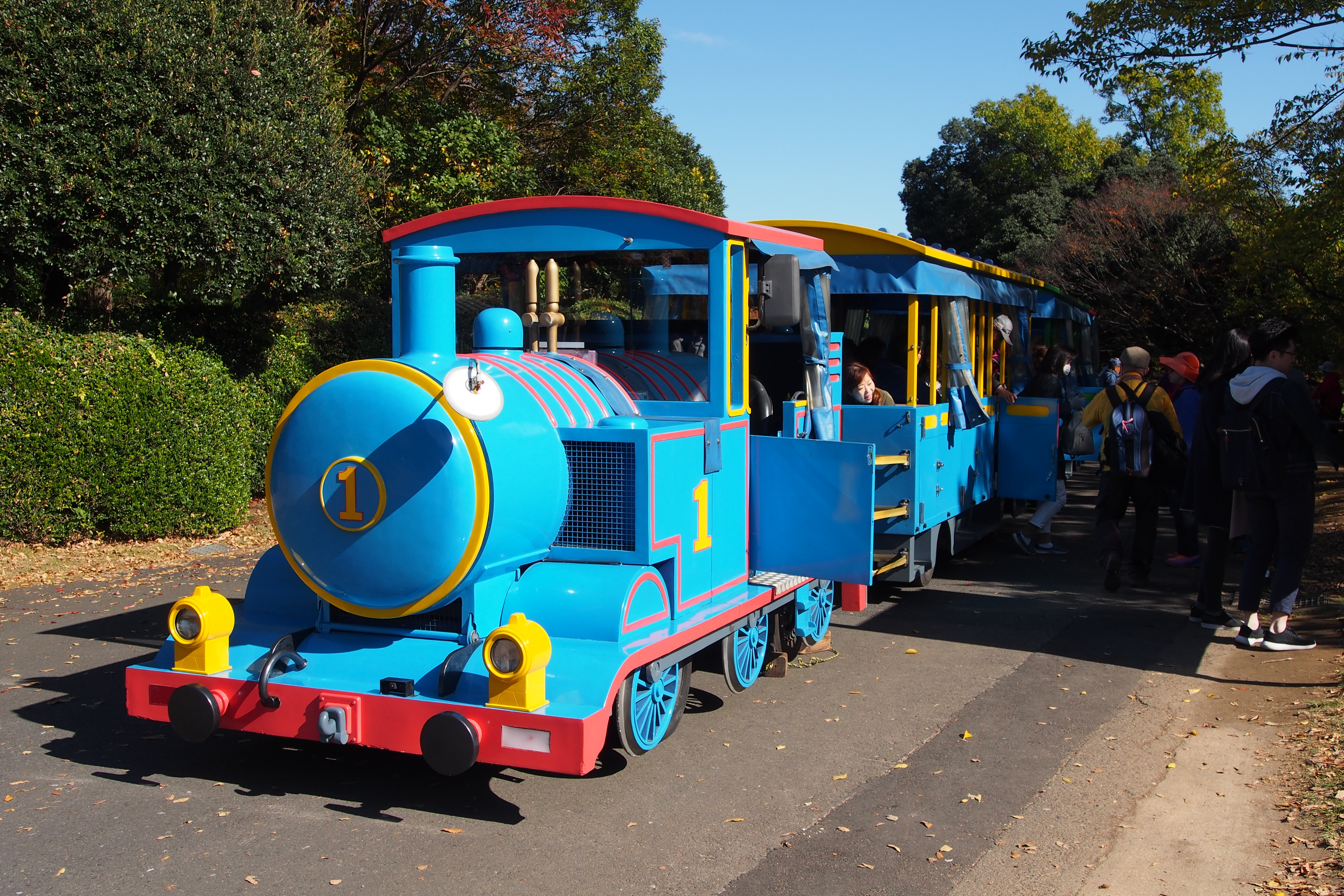

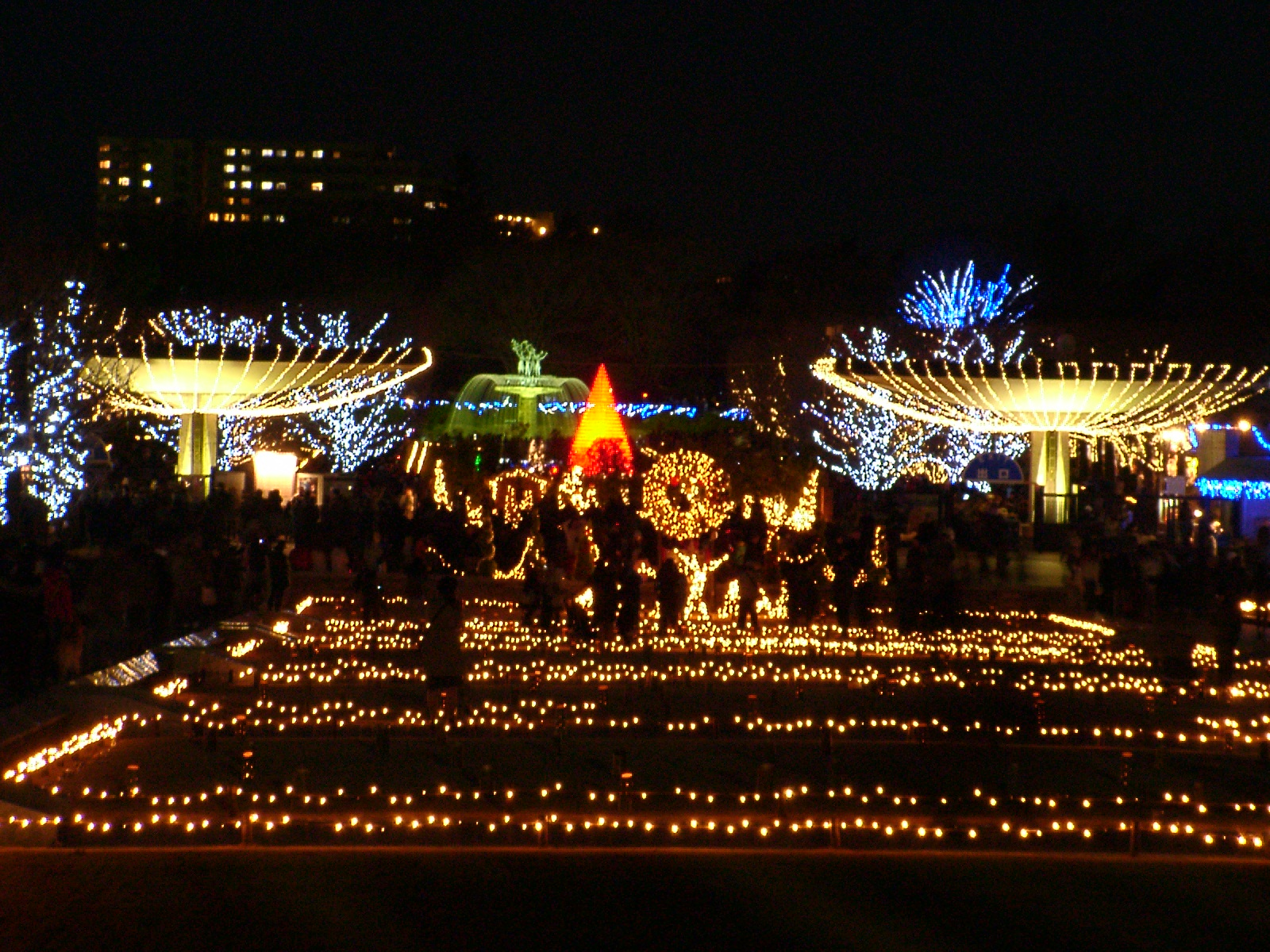
