= Akishima =

Akishima 昭島市
- City
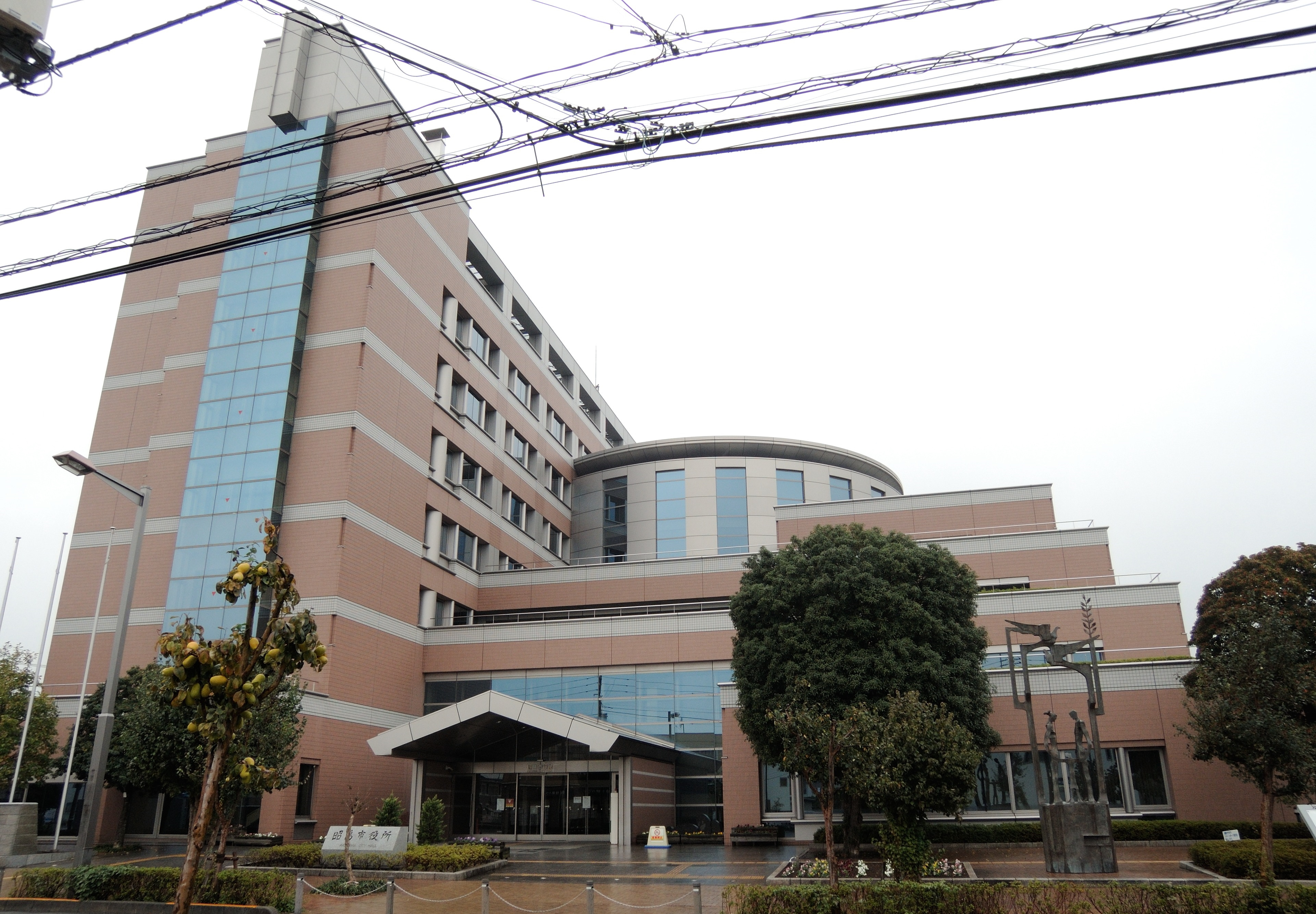
- Akishima City Hall

- Flag Seal

- Location of Akishima in Tokyo Metropolis

- Coordinates: 35°42′20.4″N 139°21′12.7″E
- Country: Japan
- Region: Kantō
- Prefecture: Tokyo

Government
  - Mayor: Joichi Kitagawa (since October 2000)

Area
  - Total: 17.34 km^{2} (6.70 sq mi)

Population (April 2021)
  - Total: 113,542
  - Density: 6,548/km^{2} (16,960/sq mi)
- Time zone: UTC+9 (Japan Standard Time)
- Tree: Osmanthus
- Flower: Azalea
- Phone number: 042-544-5111
- Address: 1-17-1 Tanaka-cho, Akishima-shi, Tokyo-to 196-8511
- Website: Official website

Akishima (昭島市, Akishima-shi; Japanese pronunciation: [ä̀.k̟ʲi̥.ɕí.mä́(.ɕì)]) is a city located in the western portion of the Tokyo Metropolis, Japan. As of 1 April 2021, the city had an estimated population of 113,542, and a population density of 6500 persons per km^{2}. The total area of the city is 17.34 square kilometres (6.70 sq mi).

== Geography ==
Akishima is located on the left bank of the Tama River, about 35 kilometers west of central Tokyo. The Tamagawa Aqueduct flows in the northern part of the city. The city area generally slopes gently from northwest to southeast toward the Tama River, which flows to the south of the city. The altitude of the city area is 170.72 meters above sea level at the highest point and 76.68 meters at the lowest point. With the JR East Ome Line running east to west through the city as a boundary, housing estates, industrial parks, golf courses, and the Showa Memorial Park occupy a large area in the north. In the south, residential areas occupy a large proportion of the city area.

=== Surrounding municipalities ===
Tokyo Metropolis

- Fussa
- Hachiōji
- Hino
- Tachikawa

=== Climate ===
Akishima has a humid subtropical climate (Köppen Cfa) characterized by warm summers and cool winters with light to no snowfall. The average annual temperature in Akishima is 13.9 °C. The average annual rainfall is 1998 mm with September as the wettest month. The temperatures are highest on average in August, at around 25.4 °C, and lowest in January, at around 2.5 °C.

== Demographics ==
Per Japanese census data, the population of Akishima has increased steadily over the past century.

Historical population
Year	Pop.	±%
1920	5,896	—
1930	7,500	+27.2%
1940	13,936	+85.8%
1950	31,692	+127.4%
1960	44,805	+41.4%
1970	75,662	+68.9%
1980	89,344	+18.1%
1990	105,372	+17.9%
2000	106,532	+1.1%
2010	112,297	+5.4%
2020	113,949	+1.5%

== History ==
The area of present-day Akishima was part of ancient Musashi Province, and a center for sericulture. In the post–Meiji Restoration cadastral reform of July 22, 1878, the area became part of Kitatama District in Kanagawa Prefecture. Haiji, Nakagami, and Sotoyatsu villages were created on April 1, 1889, with the establishment of the modern municipalities system. The entire district was transferred to the control of Tokyo Metropolis on April 1, 1893. The latter two villages merged on January 1, 1928, to form Shōwa Village. Following the dedication of Tachikawa Airfield, which was established in 1922, the surrounding area developed in the 1930s with large-scale munitions factories for aircraft manufacturing for the Imperial Japanese Army.

Shōwa was elevated to town status on January 1, 1941, and through merger with the village of Haiji on May 1, 1954, became the city of Akishima. The name comes from the kun'yomi of the first kanji in the name of the former town of Shōwa, and the on'yomi of the second kanji in the name of the former village of Haijima.

== Government ==
Akishima has a mayor-council form of government with a directly elected mayor and a unicameral city council of 22 members. Akishima contributes one member to the Tokyo Metropolitan Assembly. In terms of national politics, the city is part of Tokyo 25th district of the lower house of the Diet of Japan.

== Economy ==
Akishima was developed as an industrial suburb of Tokyo, and still has large factories operated by Hoya Corporation, JEOL, Japan Aviation Electronics, Fostex, Shōwa Aircraft Industry Co., and others. The city is also a bedroom community for the Tokyo metropolitan area.

== Education ==
Akishima has two public high schools operated by the Tokyo Metropolitan Board of Education.

- Haijima High School
- Showa High School

Akishima has 13 public elementary schools and six public junior high schools operated by the city government.

Municipal junior high schools:

- Fukujima Junior High School (福島中学校)
- Haijima Junior High School (拝島中学校)
- Seisen Junior High School (清泉中学校)
- Showa Junior High School (昭和中学校)
- Tamabe Junior High School (多摩辺中学校)
- Zuiun Junior High School (瑞雲中学校)

Municipal elementary schools:

- Azuma Elementary School (東小学校)
- Fujimigaoka Elementary School (富士見丘小学校)
- Hajima No. 1 Elementary School (拝島第一小学校)
- Hajima No. 2 Elementary School (拝島第二小学校)
- Hajima No. 3 Elementary School (拝島第三小学校)
- Koka Elementary School (光華小学校)
- Kyosei Elementary School (共成小学校)
- Musashino Elementary School (武蔵野小学校)
- Nakagami Elementary School (中神小学校)
- Seirin Elementary School (成隣小学校)
- Tamagawa Elementary School (玉川小学校)
- Tanaka Elementary School (田中小学校)
- Tsutsuji Gaoka Elementary School (つつじが丘小学校)

Former municipal elementary schools:

- Hajima No. 4 Elementary School (拝島第四小学校) – Merged into Hajima No. 1 in 2015 (Heisei 27)
- Tsutsuji Gaoka Kita Elementary School (つつじが丘北小学校) – Merged into Tsutsuji Gaoka in 2016 (Heisei 28)
- Tsutsuji Gaoka Minami Elementary School (つつじが丘南小学校) – Merged into Tsutsuji Gaoka in 2016 (Heisei 28)

The city also has one combined private elementary, junior high, and high school: Keimei Gakuen.

== Transportation ==
=== Railroads ===
JR East – Ōme Line

- Higashi-Nakagami – Nakagami – Akishima – Haijima

JR East – Hachikō Line

- Haijima

JR East – Itsukaichi Line

- Haijima

– Seibu Haijima Line

- Haijima

=== Highway ===
- National Route 16

== Local attractions ==
- Showa Memorial Park
- Tamagawa Aqueduct
- Hajima Daishi Buddhist temple

== Notable people ==
- Satoshi Koizumi, professional soccer player
- Aja Kong, professional wrestler
- Takao Koyama, screenwriter and novelist
- Sota Miura, professional soccer player
- Naoto Sago, karateka wrestler
- Ryo Yoshizawa, actor
