= Demographics of Japan =

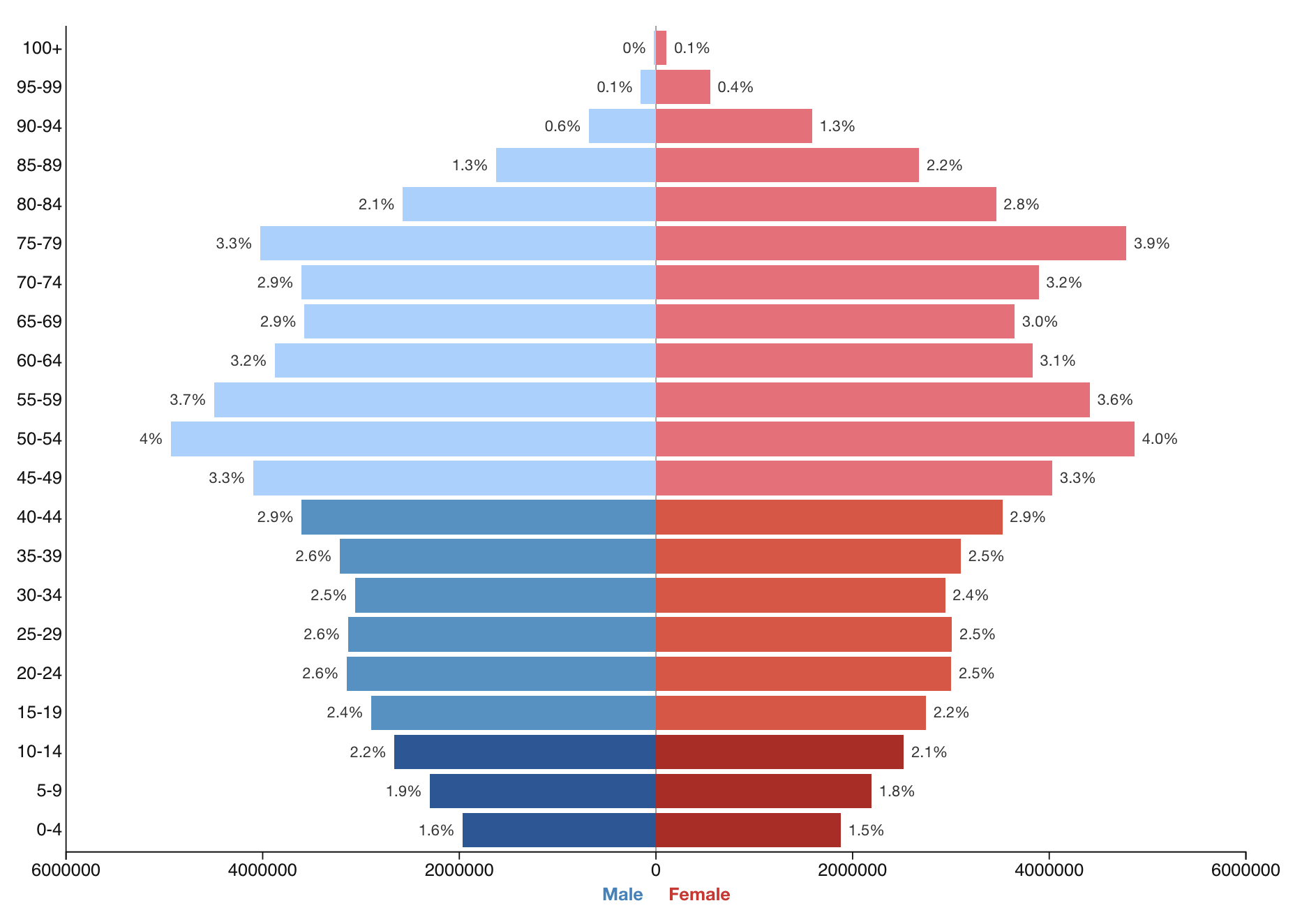
- Population pyramid of Japan in 2026
- Population: ▼122,690,000 (October 2026) (12th)
- Density: 343.28/km^{2} (889.1/sq mi) (2022)
- Growth rate: ▼ –0.44% (2024)
- Birth rate: ▼5.8 births/1,000 population (2023 est.)
- Death rate: ▲12.7 deaths/1,000 population (2023 est.)
- Life expectancy: ▲84.83 years
  - male: ▲81 years
  - female: ▲87 years
- Fertility rate: ▼1.14 children born/woman (2024)
- Infant mortality: ▼1.9 deaths/1,000 live births
- Net migration rate: ▲0.74 migrant(s)/1,000 population
- Immigrant share: 2.8% (2024)

Age structure
- 0–14 years: ▼11.2% (2025 est.)
- 15–64 years: 58.8% (2025 est.)
- 65 and over: ▲30.0% (2025 est.)

Sex ratio
- Total: 0.95 male(s)/female (2022 est.)
- At birth: 1.06 male(s)/female

Nationality
- Nationality: Japanese
- Major ethnic: Japanese (97.5%); Yamatos (N/D); Ryukyuans (N/D); Ainus (N/D)
- Minor ethnic: Han Chinese (0.6%); Viets (0.4%); Koreans (0.3%); Other groups (1.2%)

Language
- Official: Japanese
- Spoken: Languages of Japan

Japan's population history

The demography of Japan is monitored by the National Institute of Population and Social Security Research (IPSS) and Statistics Bureau. In April 2025, Japan's population was roughly 123.4 million people, and peaked at 128.5 million people in 2010. It is the 6th-most populous country in Asia, and the 12th-most populous country in the world.

In 2024, the median age of Japanese people was projected to be 49.9 years, the highest level since 1950, compared to 29.8 for India, 38.9 for the United States and 40.2 for China. Japan has the second highest median age in the world, behind only Monaco. An improved quality of life and regular health checks are two reasons why Japan has one of the highest life expectancies in the world.

The life expectancy from birth in Japan improved significantly after World War II, rising 20 years between 1945 and 1955. As life expectancy rises further, Japan expects to experience difficulties caring for the older generations in the future. Shortages in the service sector are already a major concern, with demand for nurses and care workers increasing.

The fertility rate among Japanese women was around 1.4 children per woman from 2010 to 2018. From then until 2022, the fertility rate declined to 1.2. Apart from a small baby boom in the early 1970s, the crude birth rate in Japan has been declining since 1950. It reached its current lowest point of 5.8 births per thousand people in 2023. With a falling birth rate and a large share of its inhabitants reaching old age, Japan's population is expected to continue declining, a trend that has been seen since 2010.

Japanese is a major language of the Japonic language family spoken by Japanese people, which is separated into several dialects, with the Tokyo dialect considered Standard Japanese. Japanese has around 128 million speakers, primarily in Japan, the only country where it is the national language, and within the Japanese diaspora across the globe.

The sex ratio in Japan in 2021 was 95.38 males per 100 females. There are 61.53 million males and 64.52 million females in Japan. The female percentage of the population was 51.18%, compared to 48.82% male population. Japan has 2.98 million more females than males.

== Historical overview ==
Historical population
Year	Pop.	±% p.a.
1920	55,963,053	—
1925	59,736,822	+1.31%
1930	64,450,005	+1.53%
1935	69,254,148	+1.45%
1940	73,114,308	+1.09%
1945	71,998,104	−0.31%
1950	83,199,637	+2.93%
1955	89,275,529	+1.42%
1960	93,418,501	+0.91%
1965	98,274,961	+1.02%
1970	103,720,060	+1.08%
1975	111,939,643	+1.54%
1980	117,060,396	+0.90%
1985	121,048,923	+0.67%
1990	123,611,167	+0.42%
1995	125,570,246	+0.31%
2000	126,925,843	+0.21%
2005	127,767,994	+0.13%
2010	128,057,352	+0.05%
2015	127,094,745	−0.15%
2020	126,146,099	−0.15%
2025	123,049,524	−0.50%
2026	122,690,000	−0.29%
Population size may be affected by changes in administrative divisions.

In 2025, Japan was the world's twelfth-most populous country. Japan's population had declined by 0.8 percent from the time of the 2012 census, the first time it had declined since the 1945 census.

Since 2010, Japan has experienced net population loss due to falling birth rates and minimal immigration, despite having one of the highest life expectancies in the world, at 85.00 years in 2016. It stood at 81.25 in 2006. Using the annual estimate for October of each year, the population peaked in 2008 at 128,083,960 and had fallen by 2,983,352 by October 2021.

Based on 2012 data from the National Institute of Population and Social Security Research, Japan's population will keep declining by about one million people every year in the coming decades, which would leave it with a population of around 70 million by 2060 and 42 million by early 22nd century if the current projections do not change. More than 40% of the population is expected to be over the age of 65 in 2060.

In 2021, the population declined by 644,000, the largest drop on record since 1945 and also reflecting a record low of 831,000 births. In 2013, more than 20 percent of the population of Japan were aged 65 and over. Many reasons are behind the decline, including the declining birthrates, and the ratio of men to women since the last measurements from 2006 and 2010. According to the Japanese Health Ministry, the population is estimated to drop from its current state of 125.58 million to 86.74 million by 2060.

In July 2000, the population consisted of 47,062,743 households, with 78.7% in urban areas. Japan has a high population density of 329.5 people per square kilometer. There are 1,523 persons per square kilometer of habitable land.

Japan dropped steadily from the 5th most populous country in the world to the 12th over the period of 1964 to 2023. Between 2010 to 2015, Japan's population shrank by almost a million, and Japan lost a half-million in 2022 alone. The number of Japanese citizens decreased by 801,000 to 122,423,038 in 2022 from a year earlier, which was the most severe decrease and the first time all 47 prefectures have suffered a decline since the launch of the poll in 1968. In early 2010, Japan's population reached 128,057,352. In the 2010s, the long-lasting effects of Japanese economic crisis during the Great Recession strongly slowed down immigration rates in Japan.

In March 2011, Japan was hit by an earthquake and tsunami, which caused the meltdown of the Fukushima nuclear plant. These disasters resulted in 20,000 deaths, a reduction of about 1.39 years in the average life expectancy, a decrease in birth rates, and the steepest decrease in immigration rates since the Chernobyl disaster in 1986.

From January 2020 to the end of September 2021 and as a direct effect of COVID-19 pandemic, Japan registered at least 112,000 excess deaths, a reduction of about 2.6 years in the average life expectancy, a noticeable decrease in birth rates and a marked decrease in immigration rates. The overall effect was a record population decline of 798,214 persons in that year. The excess mortality rate for all causes has been estimated at between 100,000 and 130,000 deaths. It is the largest population decline recorded since World War I (1914–1918), Spanish flu pandemic (1918–1920), Great Kanto earthquake (1923), Showa Recession and Depression of 1930s, and Asia-Pacific War in World War II (1937–1945).

A 2023 demographic study found that the Japanese population, including foreign residents, declined from 128 million people in 2010 to 124.3 million people in 2023, with a decrease of almost 511,000 people in one year.

View source data.
View source data.
View source data.
View source data.
View source data.

== Population ==
=== Census ===
Japan collects census information every five years, with censuses conducted by the Statistics Bureau of the Ministry of Internal Affairs. The latest population census reflects the situation in 2020.

=== Population density ===
A map of Japan's population density by municipality, July 2025.

In 2025, Japan's population density was 338 people per square kilometer (875 people per square mile). It ranks 41st in a list of countries by population density. Between 1955 and 1989, land prices in the six largest cities increased by 15,000%, +12% per year compounded. Urban land prices generally increased 40% from 1980 to 1987. In the six largest cities, the price of land doubled over that period. For many families, this trend put housing in central cities out of reach.

The result was lengthy commutes for many workers in the big cities, especially in Tokyo area/Kanto Region, where daily commutes of two hours each way are common. In 1991, as the bubble economy started to collapse, land prices began a steep decline, and within a few years fell 60% below their peak. After a decade of declining land prices, residents began moving back into central city areas, especially Tokyo's 23 wards, as evidenced by 2005 census figures. Despite nearly 70% of Japan being covered by forests, parks in many major cities—especially Tokyo and Osaka—are smaller and scarcer than in major West European or North American cities. As of 2014, parkland per inhabitant in Tokyo is 5.78 square meters, which is roughly half of the 11.5 square meters of Madrid.

National and regional governments devote resources to making regional cities and rural areas more attractive by developing transportation networks, social services, industry, and educational institutions to try to decentralize settlement and improve the quality of life. Nevertheless, major cities, especially Tokyo, Yokohama and Fukuoka, and to a lesser extent Kyoto, Osaka and Nagoya, remain attractive to young people seeking education and jobs.

=== Urban distribution ===
By 2015 census, the % of the population living in:
1. Kantō region (34.5%)
2. Keihanshin (16.3%)
3. Tōkai region (11.8%)
4. Kyushu region (11.4%)
5. Rest of Japan (26.0%)

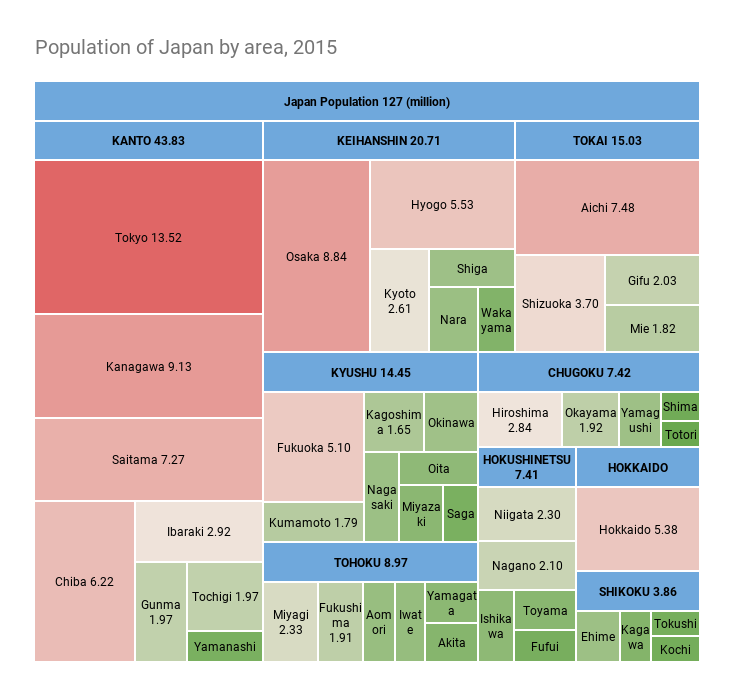
Japan's population distribution by regions (blue shades) and prefectures (red: most populous; green: less). KANTO, KEIHANSHIN and TOKAI are the three largest metropolitan areas, which have about 2/3 of Japan's population. Out of 47 prefectures, 13 are red and 34 are green. Japan's population has been decreasing since 2011. Only 8 prefectures increased their population compared to 2010, due to internal migration to large cities.

External images
- Views of the World
- Japan Gridded Population Cartogram
- Japan Gridded Population

Japan has a high population concentration in urban areas on the plains since 75% of Japan's land area is made up of mountains, and also Japan has a forest cover rate of 68.5% (the only other developed countries with such a high forest cover percentage are Finland and Sweden). The 2010 census shows 90.7% of the total Japanese population live in cities.

Japan is an urban society with about only 5% of the labor force working in agriculture. Many farmers supplement their income with part-time jobs in nearby towns and cities. About 80 million of the urban population is heavily concentrated on the Pacific shore of Honshu.

Metropolitan Tokyo–Yokohama, with its population of 35 million residents, is the world's most populous city. Japan faces the same problems that confront urban industrialized societies throughout the world: overcrowded cities and congested highways.

=== Age structure ===
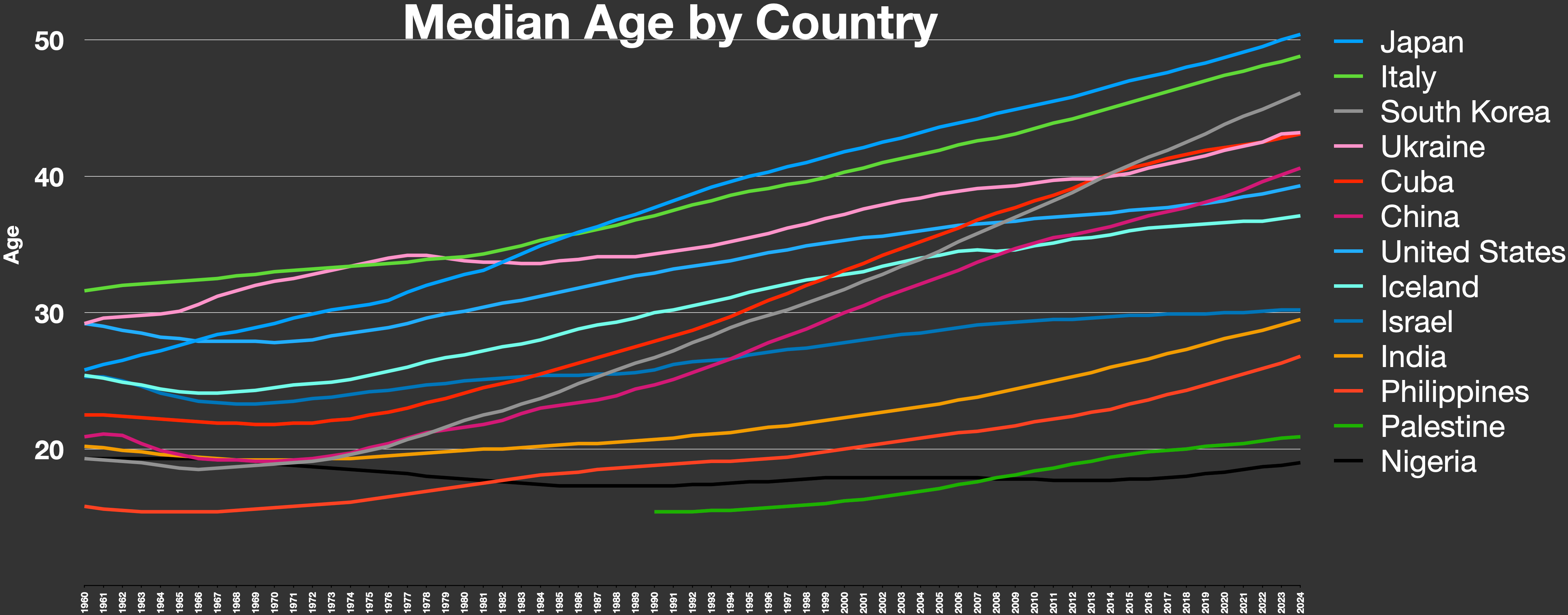
The median age by country, 2024. Japan has the highest listed age

The age structure of Japan is highly unique and is characterized by a "super-aged" society and it is the oldest population structure in the world. This demographic profile results from the combination of a high life expectancy and a persistently low total fertility rate (TFR). The age distribution is often described as a constrictive or inverted pyramid shape, with a narrow base (few young people) and a large bulge in the middle and upper ages.

Overview of the changing age distribution 1935–2025
Year	Total population (census; thousands)	Population by age (%)		
Year	Total population (census; thousands)	0–14	15–64	65+
1935	69,254	36.9%	58.5%	4.7%
1940	73,114	36.1%	59.2%	5.7%
1945	71,998	36.8%	58.1%	5.1%
1950	83,199	35.4%	59.6%	4.9%
1955	89,275	33.4%	61.2%	5.3%
1960	93,418	30.2%	64.1%	5.7%
1965	98,274	25.7%	68.0%	6.3%
1970	103,720	24.0%	68.9%	7.1%
1975	111,939	24.3%	67.7%	7.9%
1980	117,060	23.5%	67.3%	9.1%
1985	121,048	21.5%	68.2%	10.3%
1990	123,611	18.2%	69.5%	12.0%
1995	125,570	15.9%	69.4%	14.5%
2000	126,925	14.6%	67.9%	17.3%
2005	127,767	13.7%	65.8%	20.1%
2010	128,057	13.2%	63.7%	23.1%
2015	127,094	12.6%	60.7%	26.6%
2020	126,226	12.0%	59.3%	28.8%
2025	122,973	10.9%	59.8%	29.4%

Population projections for Japan (National Institute of Population and Social Security Research, 2023)
Population pyramids of Japan 2065 (middle-birth, middle-death scenario case)

Japan demographic transition 1888–2019

Japan's population is aging faster than that of any other nation. The population of those 65 years or older roughly doubled in 24 years, from 7.1% of the population in 1970 to 14.1% in 1994. The same increase took 61 years in Italy, 85 years in Sweden, and 115 years in France. In 2014, 26% of Japan's population was estimated to be 65 years or older, and the Health and Welfare Ministry has estimated that over-65s will account for 40% of the population by 2060. The demographic shift in Japan's age profile has triggered concerns about the nation's economic future and the viability of its welfare state.

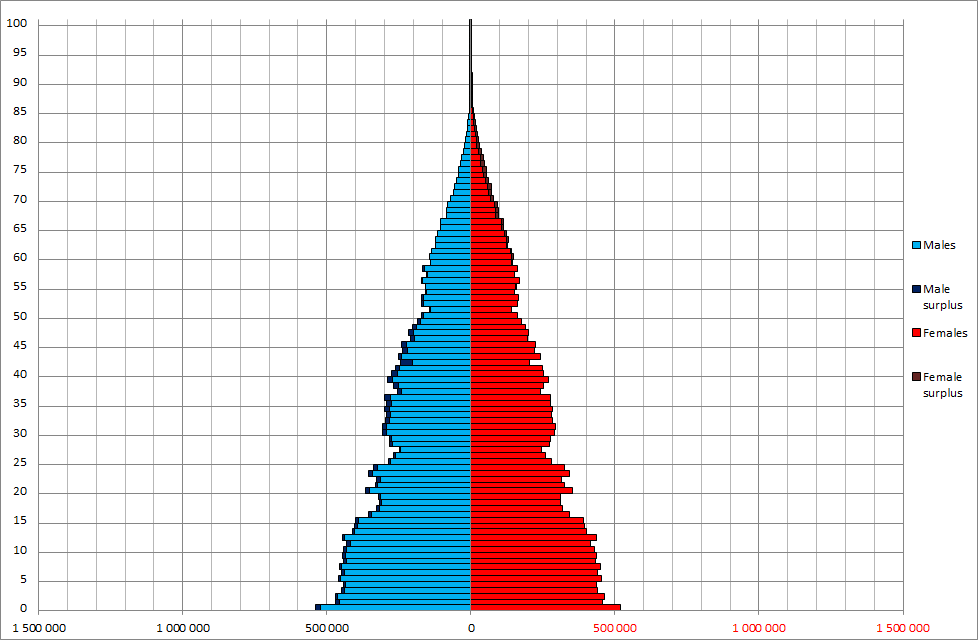
1888

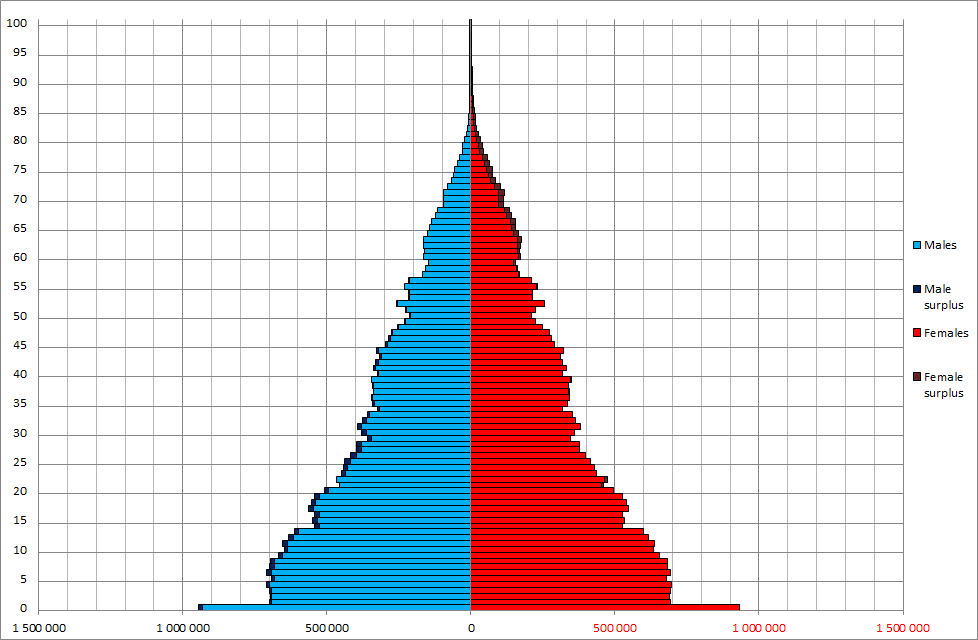
1920 (1st national census of population)

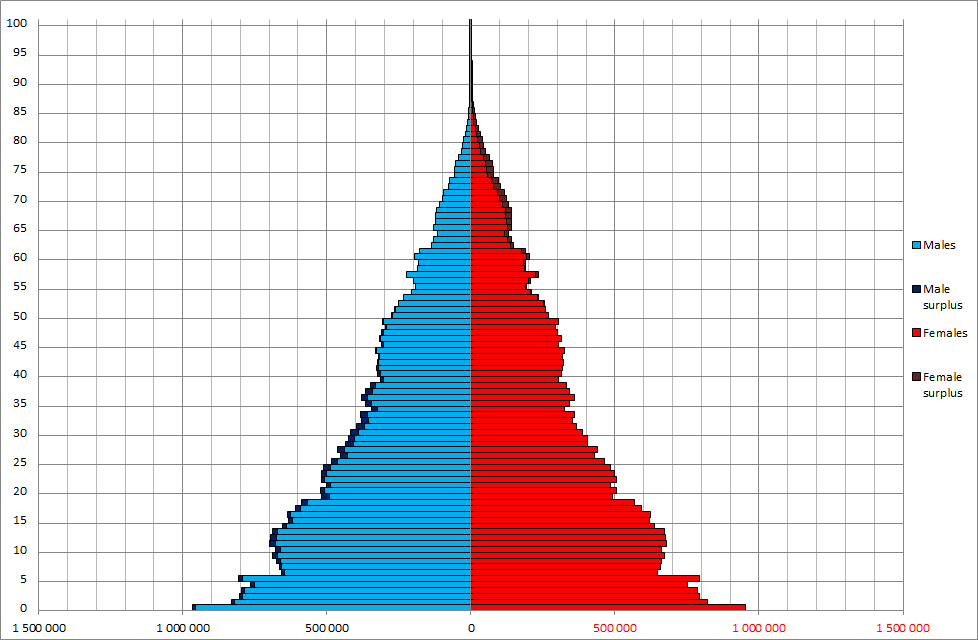
1925 (2nd national census of population)

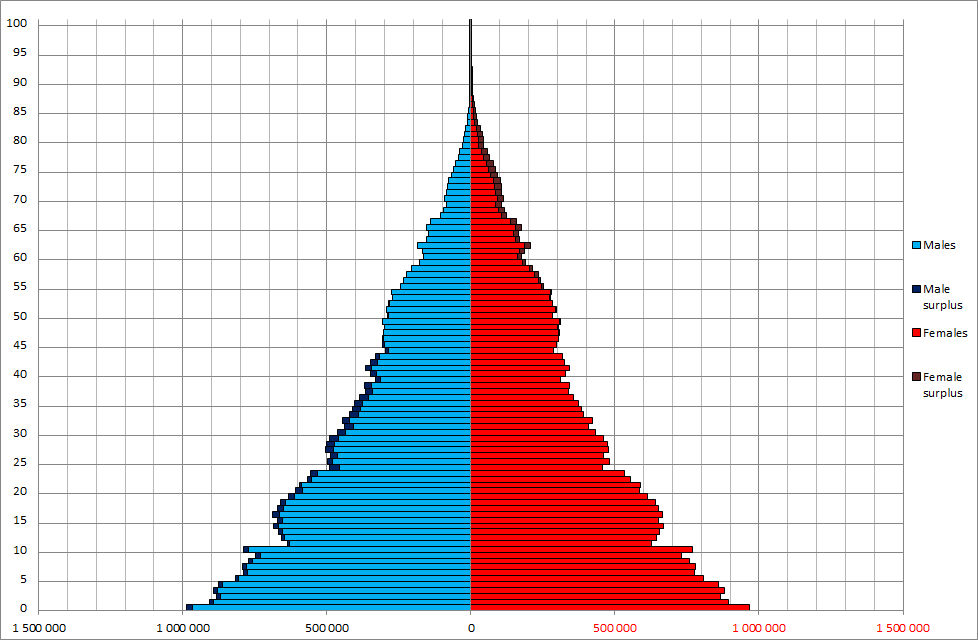
1930 (3rd national census of population)

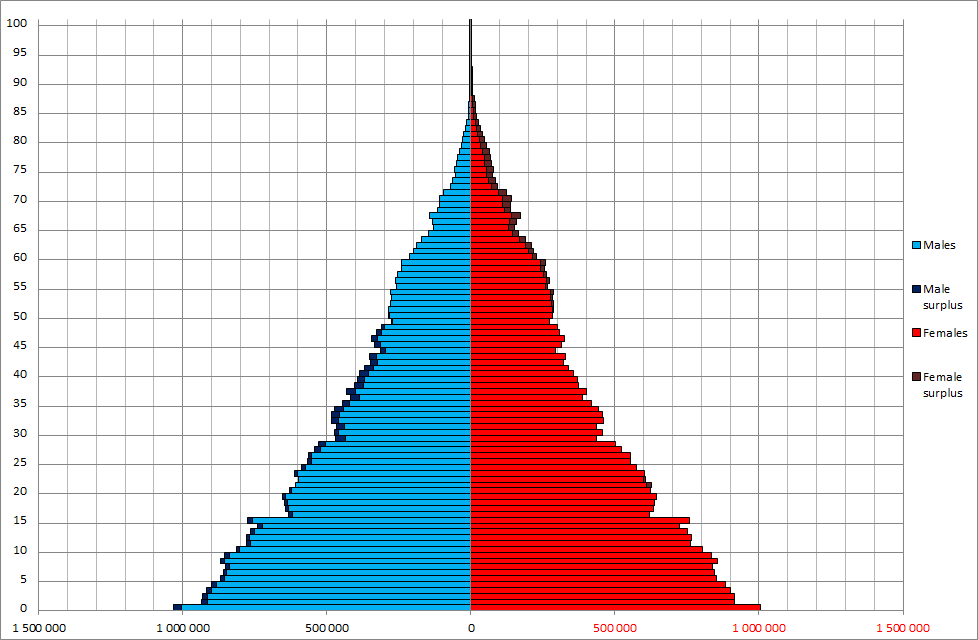
1935 (4th national census of population)

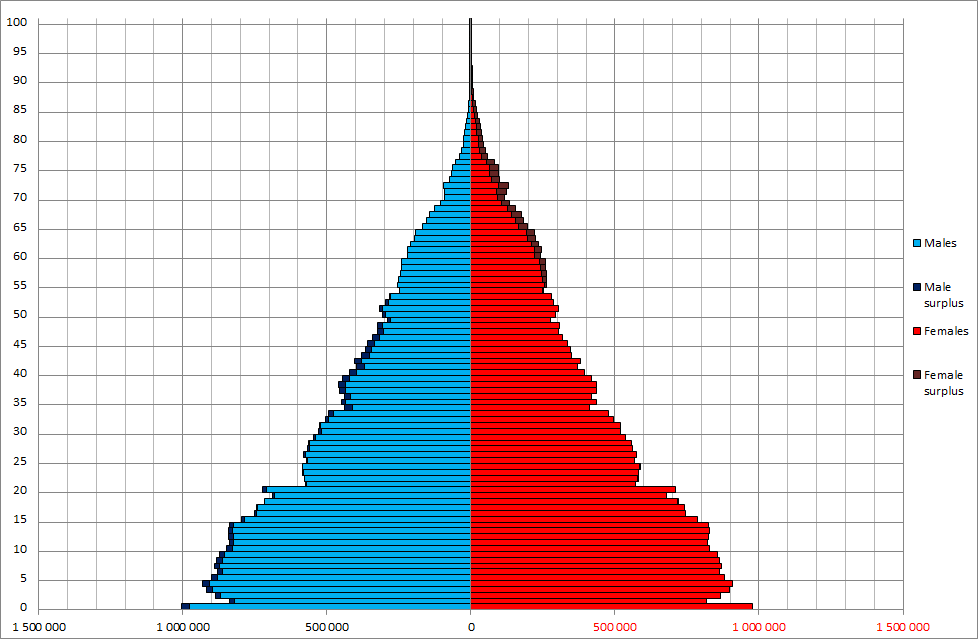
1940 (5th national census of population)

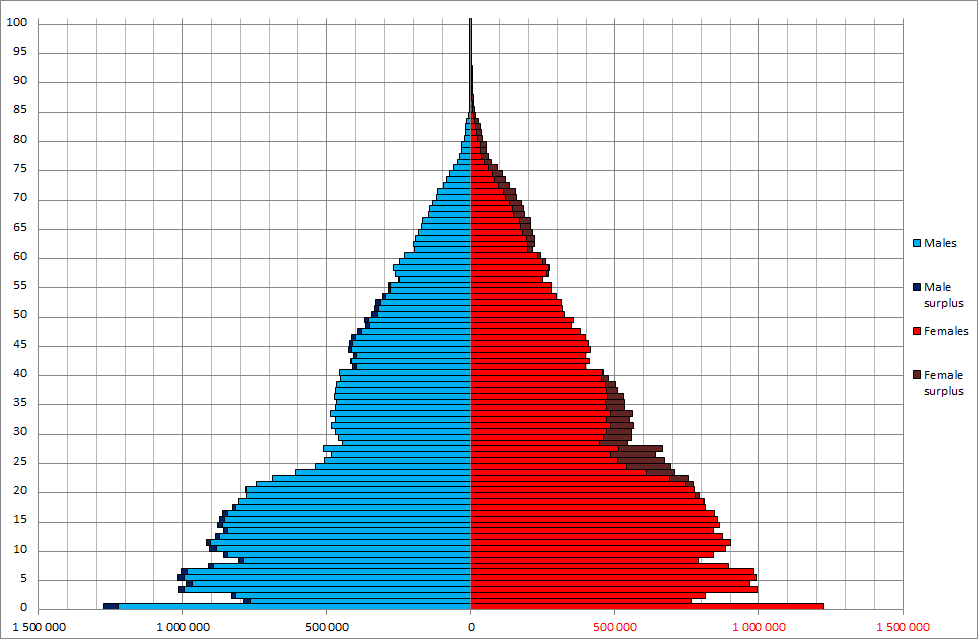
1947 (6th national census of population)

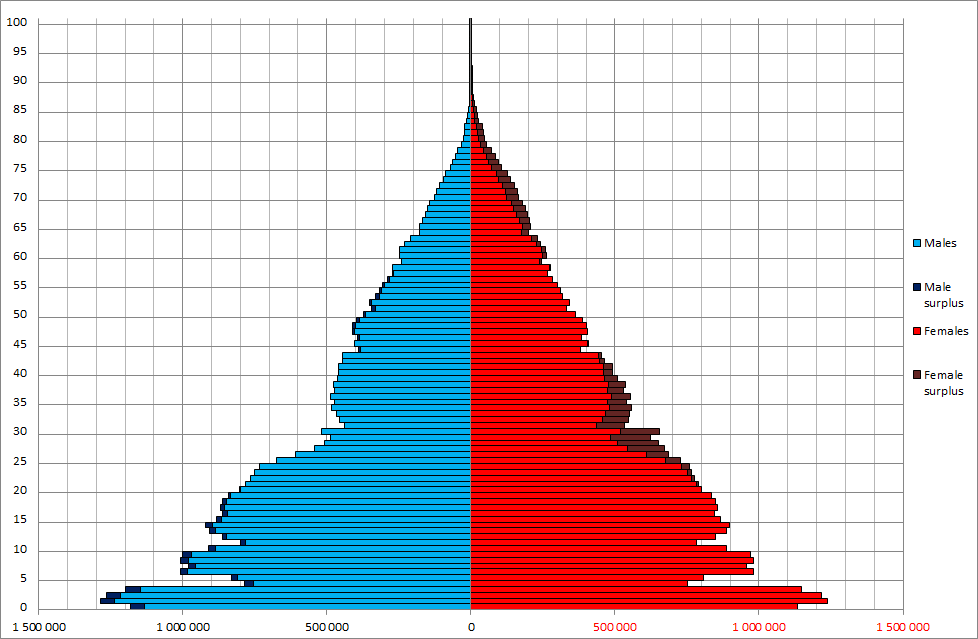
1950 (7th national census of population)

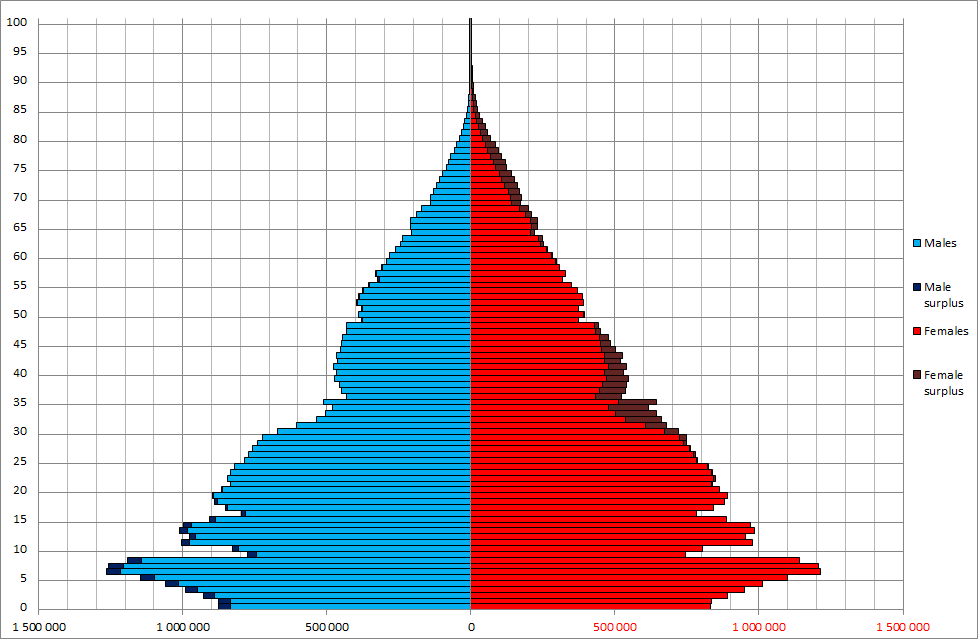
1955 (8th national census of population)

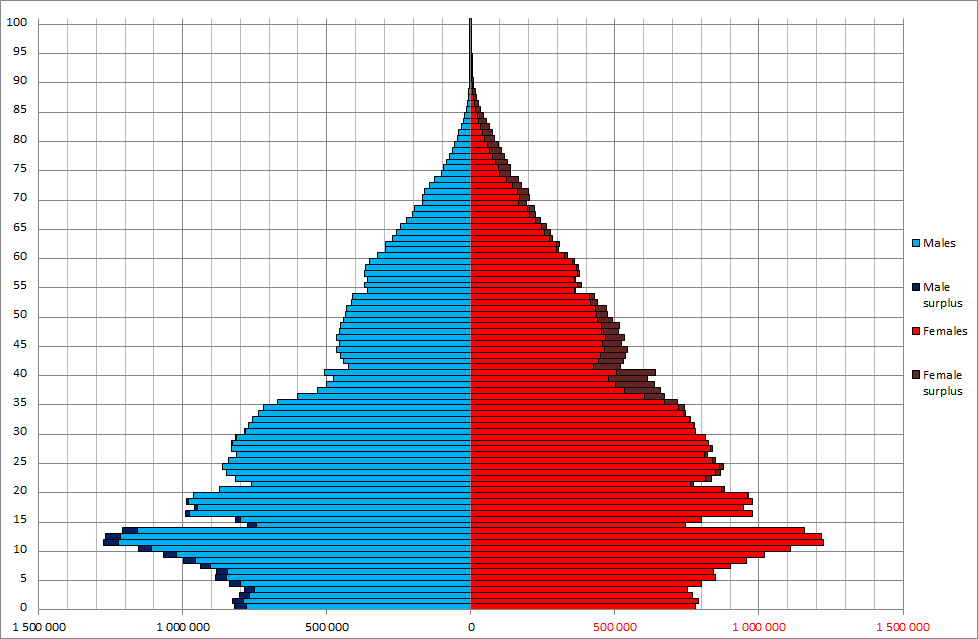
1960 (9th national census of population)

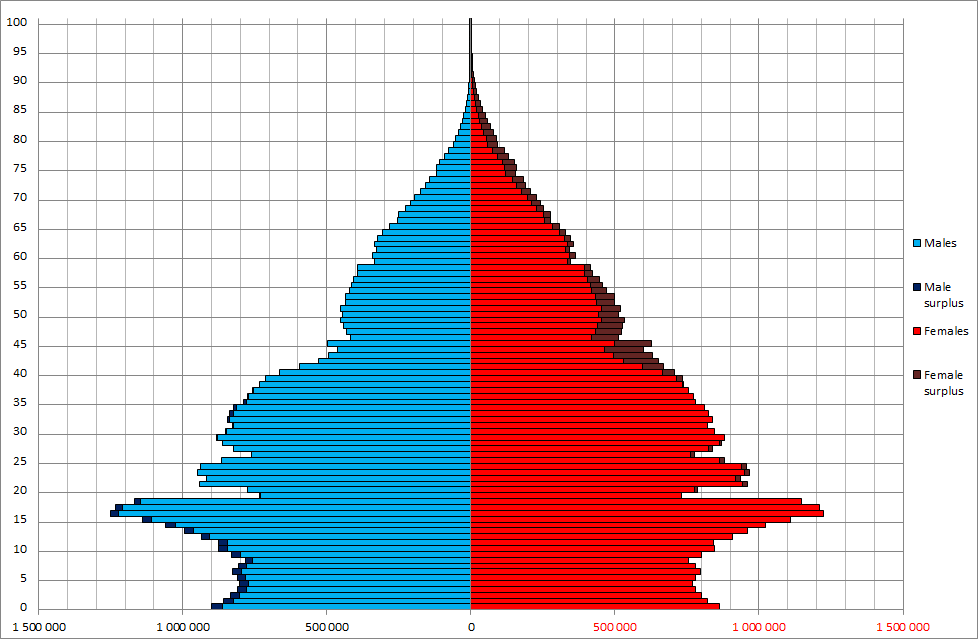
1965 (10th national census of population)

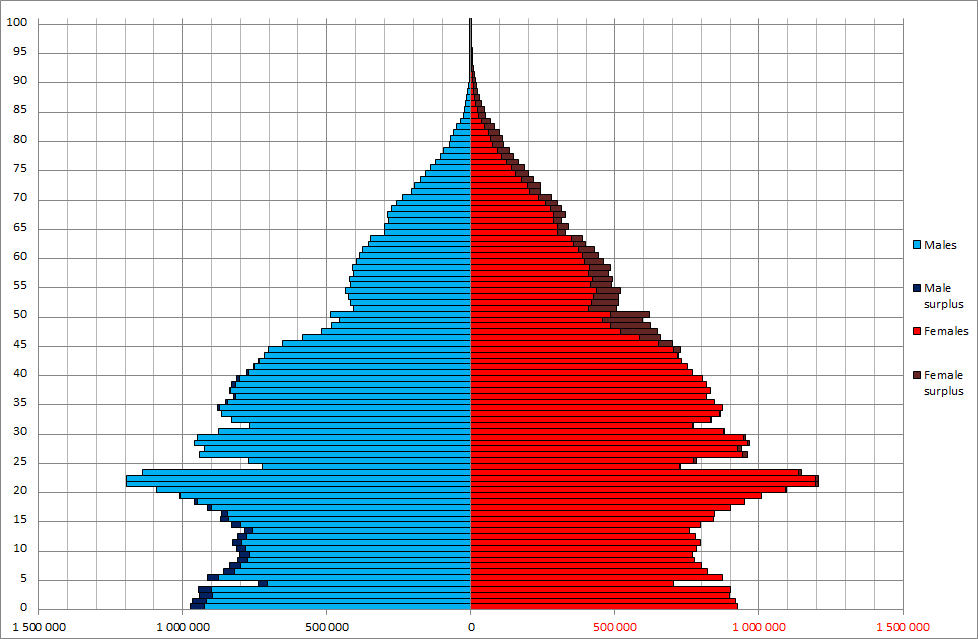
1970 (11th national census of population)

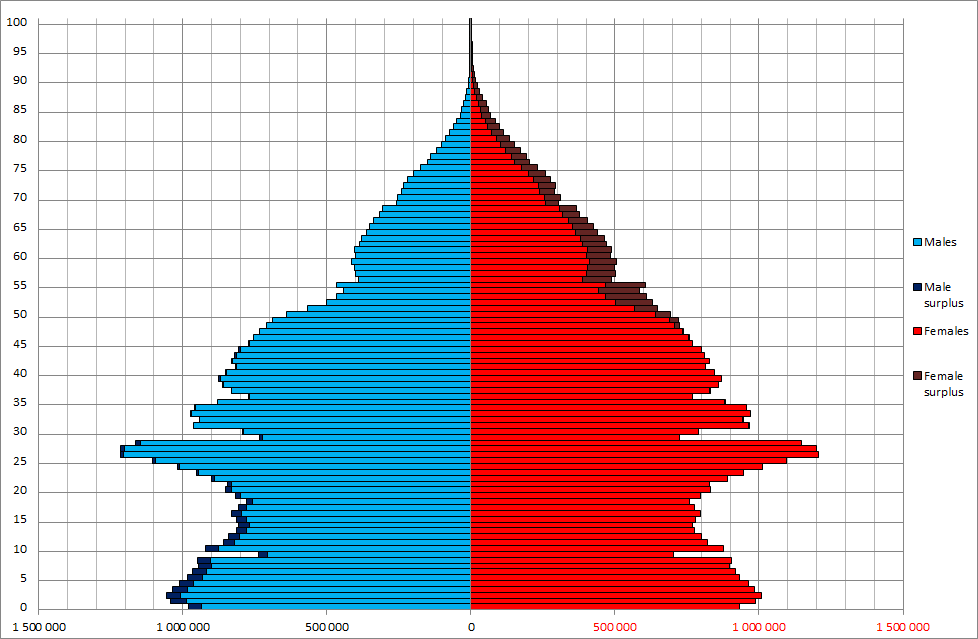
1975 (12th national census of population)

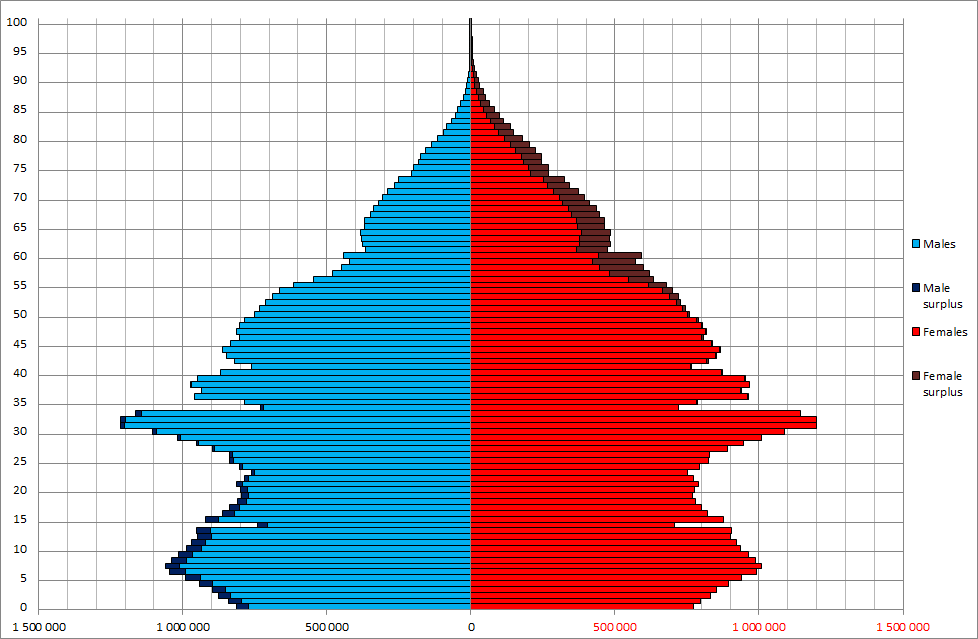
1980 (13th national census of population)

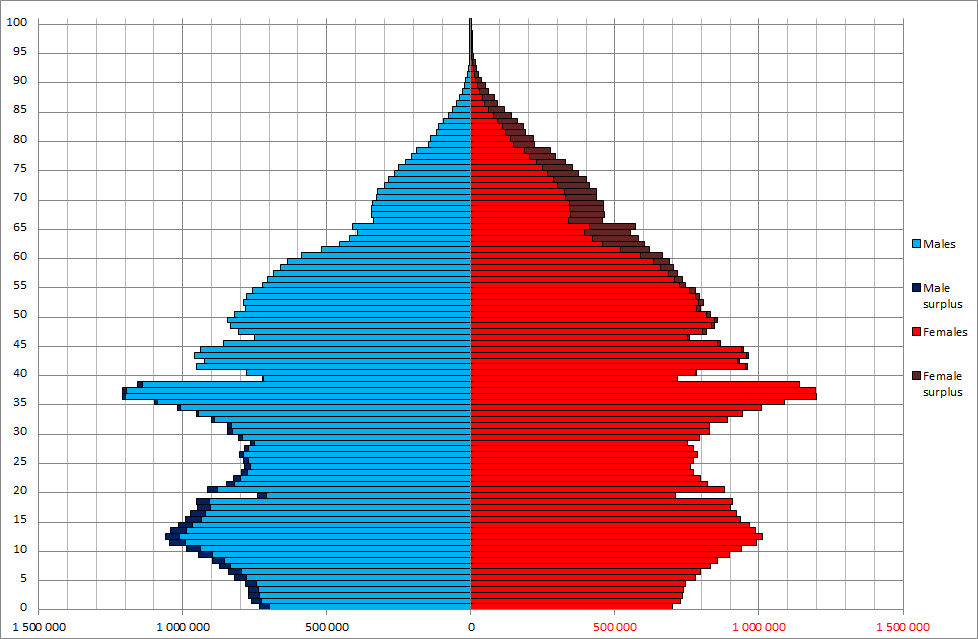
1985 (14th national census of population)

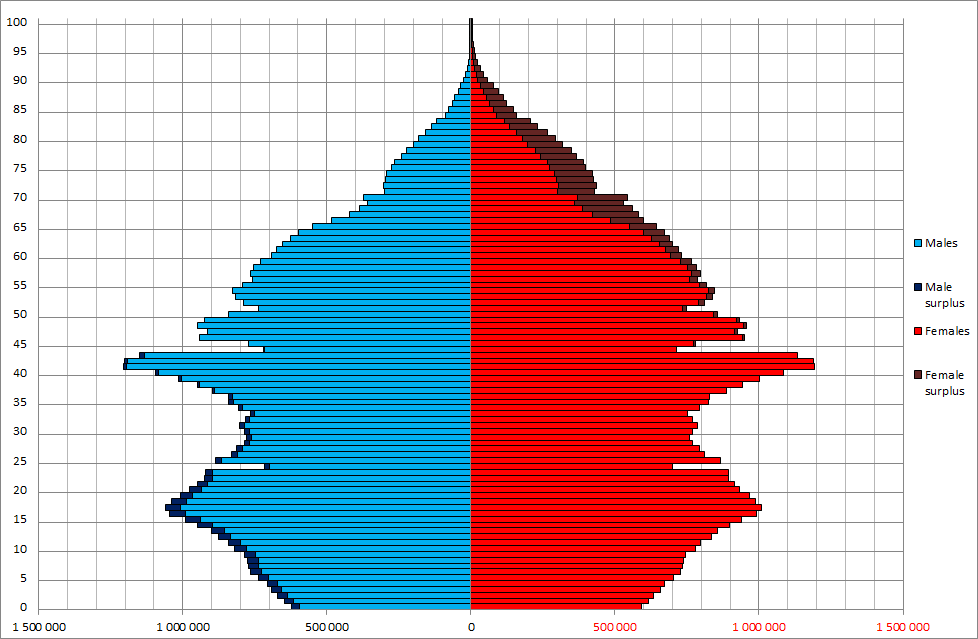
1990 (15th national census of population)

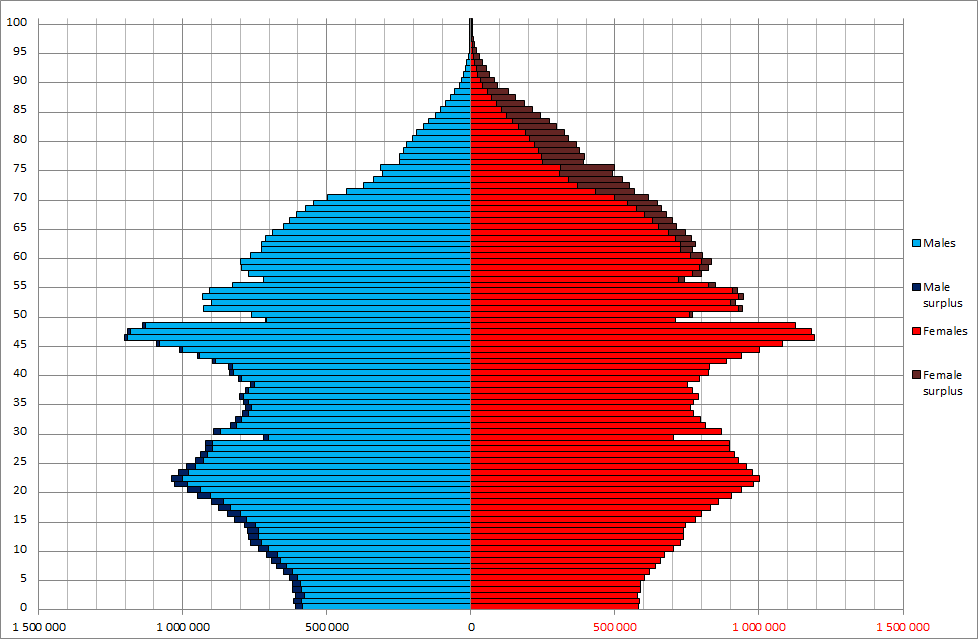
1995 (16th national census of population)

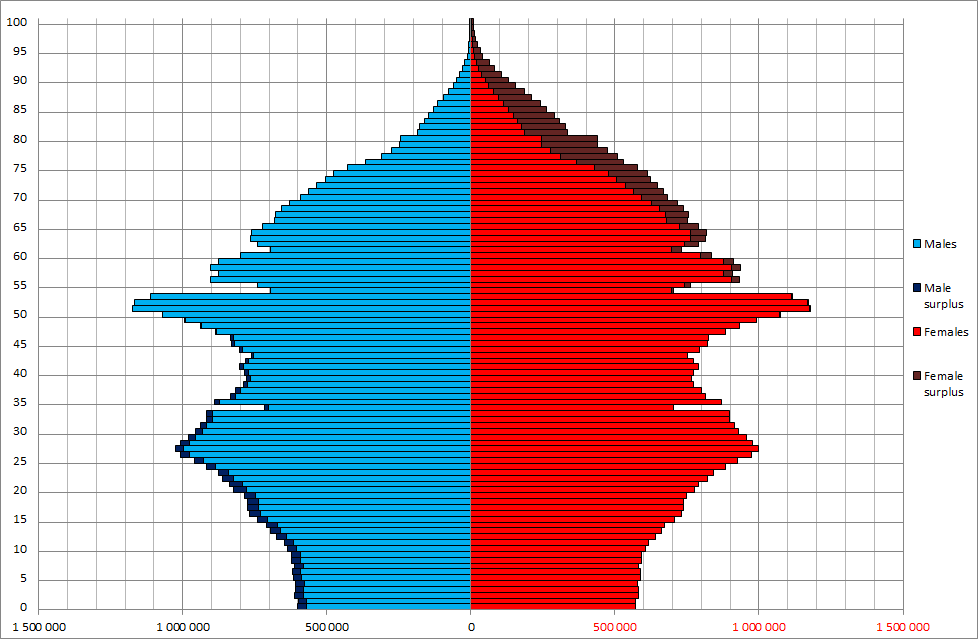
2000 (17th national census of population)

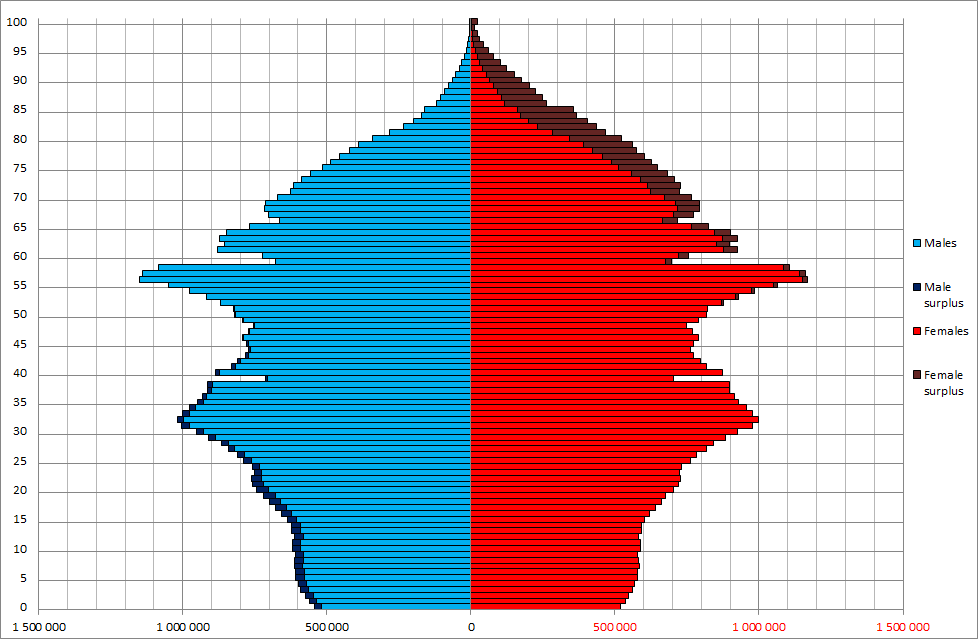
2005 (18th national census of population)

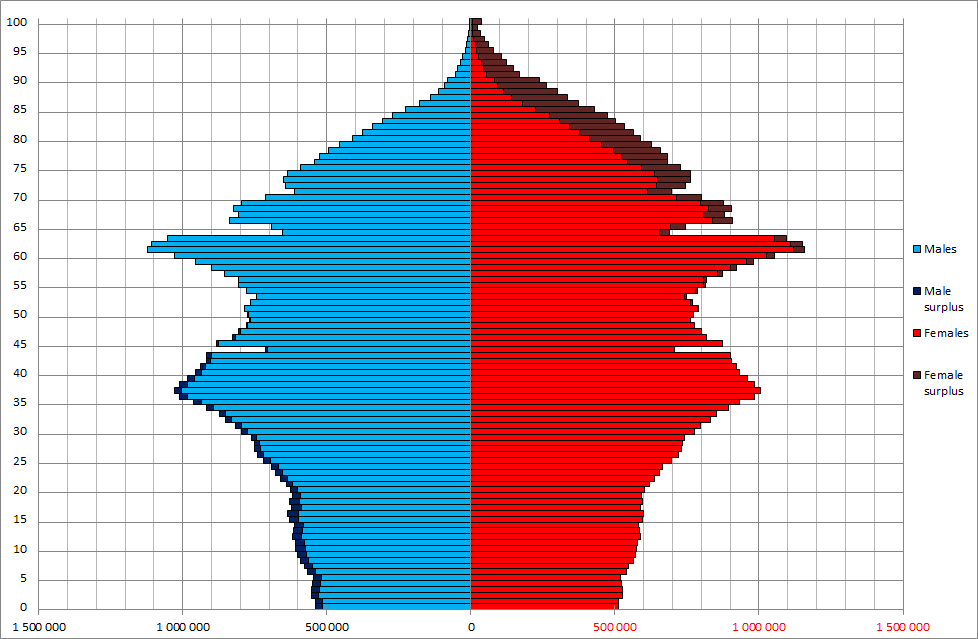
2010 (19th national census of population)

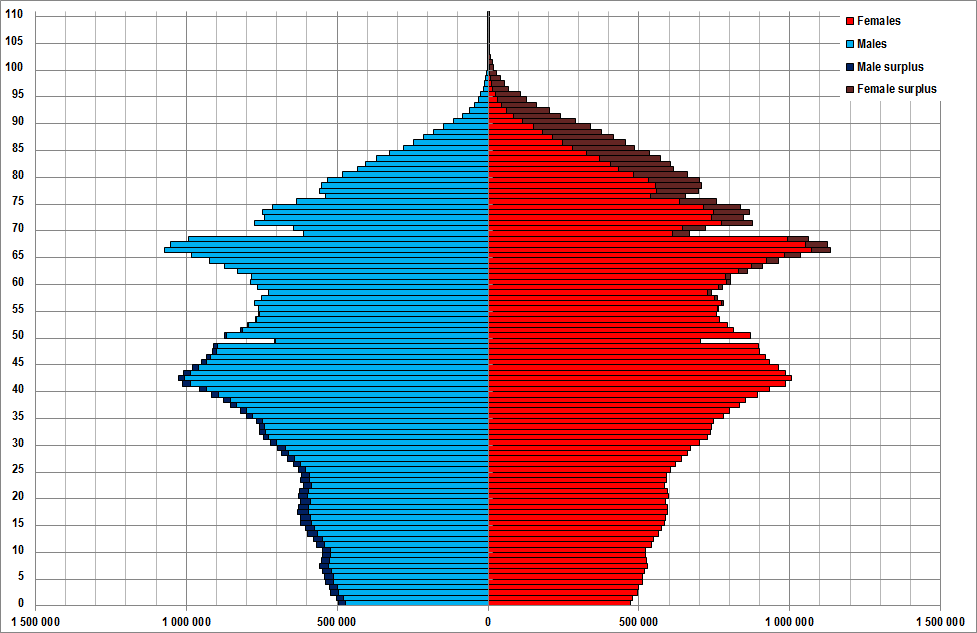
2015 (20th national census of population)

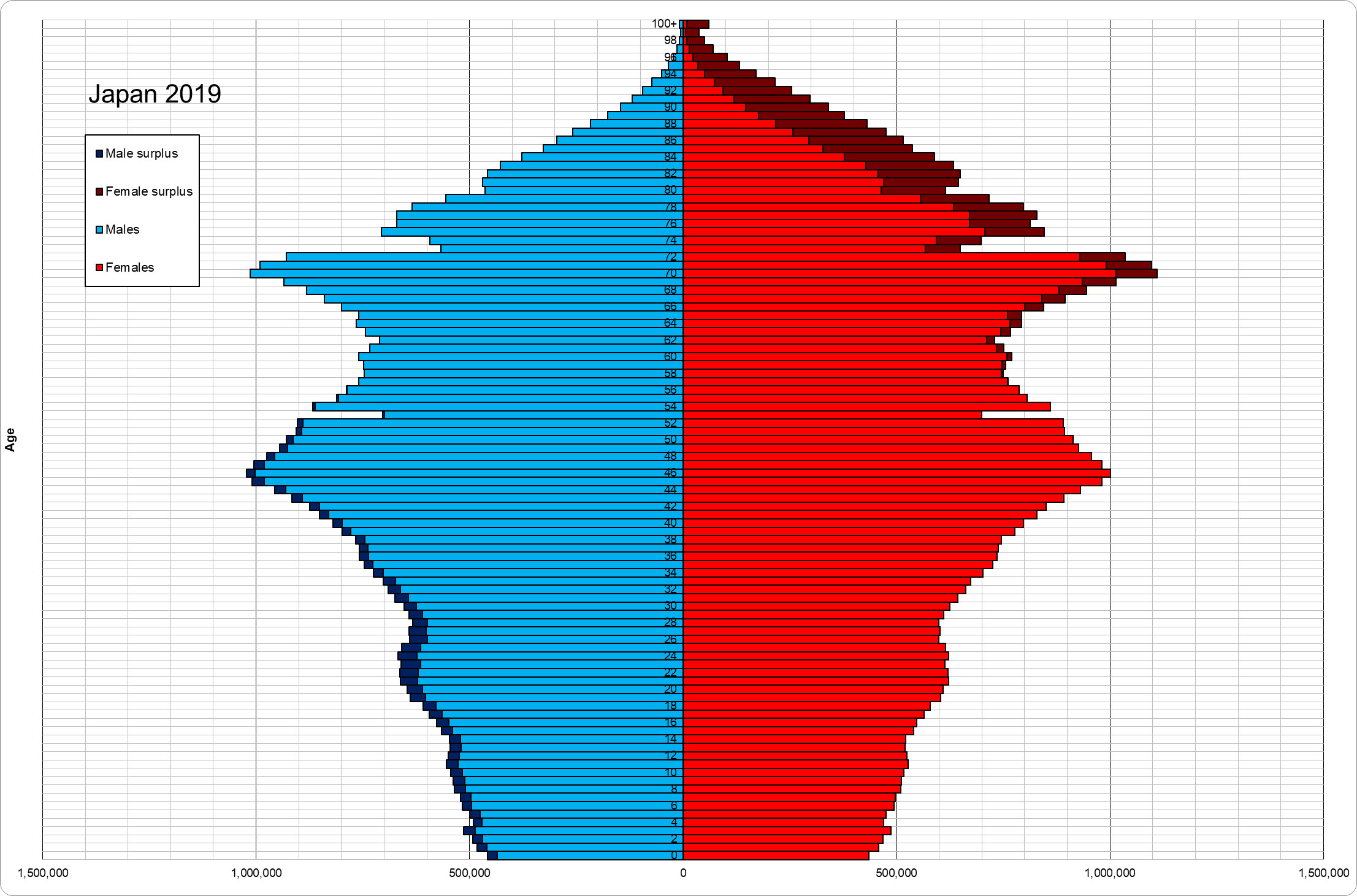
2019 estimate

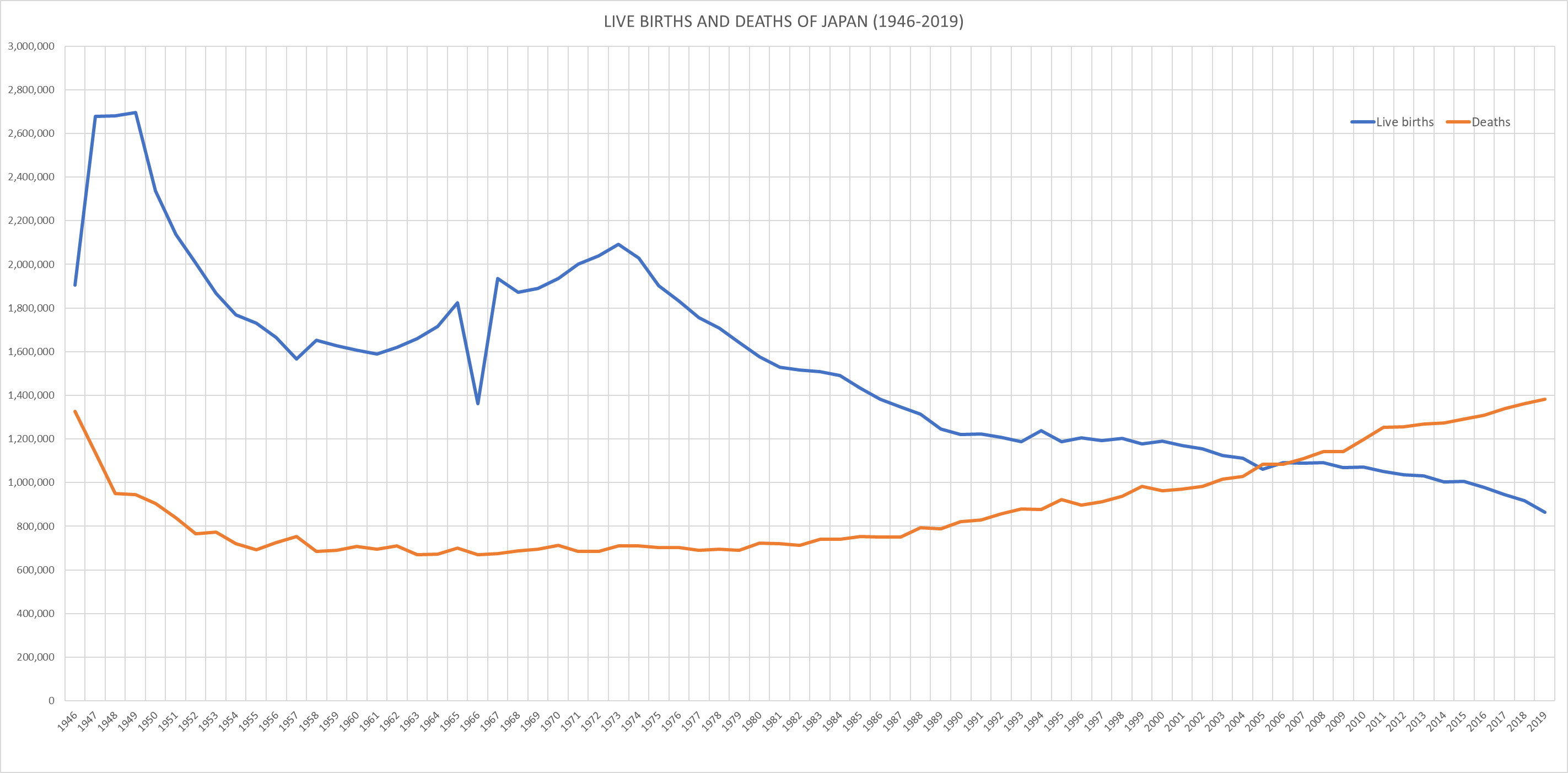
Live births and deaths of Japan (1946–2019)

=== Population pyramids by prefecture ===
Population pyramids of Japan's prefectures in 2020

Tokyo

Nagasaki

Hiroshima

Hokkaido

Kyoto

Aichi

Fukushima

Osaka

Okinawa

Aomori

Akita

Chiba

Ibaraki

Miyagi

Yamagata

Iwate

Fukuoka

Yamaguchi

Saga

Okayama

Toyama

Hyogo

Ishikawa

Niigata

Fukui

Ehime

Tokushima

Kagawa

Miyazaki

Kumamoto

Kagoshima

Kochi

Yamanashi

Oita

Kanagawa

Shizuoka

Mie

Wakayama

Saitama

Nara

Tochigi

Nagano

Gunma

Shiga

Gifu

Tottori

Shimane
Population estimates by sex and age group (01.VII.2020) (Because of rounding, totals are not in all cases the sum of the respective components. Estimates or projections based on the 2015 population census.):

Age group	Male	Female	Total	%
Total	61 226 000	64 610 000	125 836 000	100
0–4	2 406 000	2 288 000	4 694 000	3.73
5–9	2 580 000	2 462 000	5 042 000	4.01
10–14	2 736 000	2 605 000	5 341 000	4.24
15–19	2 932 000	2 792 000	5 724 000	4.55
20–24	3 298 000	3 089 000	6 386 000	5.07
25–29	3 240 000	3 036 000	6 275 000	4.99
30–34	3 391 000	3 244 000	6 635 000	5.27
35–39	3 767 000	3 665 000	7 432 000	5.91
40–44	4 289 000	4 183 000	8 472 000	6.73
45–49	4 954 000	4 847 000	9 801 000	7.79
50–54	4 353 000	4 305 000	8 658 000	6.88
55–59	3 905 000	3 913 000	7 818 000	6.21
60–64	3 674 000	3 770 000	7 443 000	5.91
65–69	4 047 000	4 305 000	8 351 000	6.64
70–74	4 288 000	4 798 000	9 086 000	7.22
75–79	3 193 000	3 953 000	7 145 000	5.68
80–84	2 239 000	3 159 000	5 398 000	4.29
85–89	1 323 000	2 394 000	3 717 000	2.95
90–94	506 000	1 316 000	1 822 000	1.45
95–99	97 000	421 000	519 000	0.41
100+	10 000	66 000	76 000	0.06
Age group	Male	Female	Total	Percent
0–14	7 722 000	7 355 000	15 077 000	11.98
15–64	37 801 000	36 843 000	74 644 000	59.32
65+	15 703 000	20 412 000	36 115 000	28.70

=== Sex ratio ===
Age group	2006	2020
At birth	1.05	1.06
0–15	1.05	1.06
15–64	1.01	1.01
65+	0.73	0.78
Total	0.95	0.94

== Vital statistics ==
Japanese birth and death rates from 1950 to 2023.

Births and total fertility rate of Japan, 1900 to 2020

=== Statistics since 1873 ===
Source: National Institute of Population and Social Security Research (IPSS) and Statistics Bureau of Japan Figures for 1947–1972 do not include Okinawa Prefecture.

Notable events in Japanese demographics:

- 1877–1879, 1885–1886, 1890–1896 – Major cholera outbreaks
- 1904–1905 – Russo-Japanese War
- 1923 – Great Kanto earthquake
- 1937–1945 – Second Sino-Japanese War and Pacific War
- 1947–1949 – Post-World War II baby boom
- 1948 – Abortion act came into force
- 1906, 1966 – Year of the Fire Horse

Year	Average population (Oct 1)	Live births	Deaths	Natural change	Crude rates (per 1000)				Total fertility rate (Note: In fertility rates, 2.1 and above is a stable population and have been marked blue, 2 and below leads to an aging population and a reducing population.)	Net change	Infant mortality rate (per 1000 births)	Life expectancy	
Year	Average population (Oct 1)	Live births	Deaths	Natural change	Births	Deaths	Natural change	Migration	Total fertility rate	Net change	Infant mortality rate (per 1000 births)	Males	Females
1873	34,806,000	809,000	660,694	148,306	23.1	18.9	4.3		3.41				
1874	34,985,000	836,000	696,653	139,347	23.8	19.8	4.0	1.3	3.52	179,000			
1875	35,316,000	869,000	654,562	214,438	24.6	18.5	6.1	2.1	3.74	331,000			
1876	35,555,000	903,000	613,022	289,978	25.4	17.2	8.2	−1.5	3.75	239,000			
1877	35,870,000	891,000	620,306	270,694	24.8	17.3	7.5	0.1	3.67	315,000			
1878	36,166,000	875,000	603,277	271,723	24.2	16.7	7.5	2.5	3.58	296,000			
1879	36,464,000	877,000	721,147	155,853	24.0	19.8	4.3	3.6	3.55	298,000			
1880	36,649,000	884,000	603,055	281,945	24.1	16.5	7.7	−2.7	3.59	185,000			
1881	36,965,000	941,000	686,064	254,936	25.5	18.6	6.9	1.7	3.77	316,000			
1882	37,259,000	923,000	668,342	254,658	24.8	17.9	6.8	1.4	3.67	294,000			
1883	37,569,000	1,005,000	676,369	328,631	26.8	18.0	8.7	−1.3	3.96	310,000			
1884	37,962,000	975,000	705,126	269,874	25.7	18.6	7.1	3.2	3.80	393,000			
1885	38,313,000	1,025,000	886,824	138,176	26.7	23.1	3.6	1.3	3.98	351,000			
1886	38,541,000	1,051,000	938,343	112,657	27.3	24.3	2.9	3.1	4.04	228,000			
1887	38,703,000	1,058,000	753,456	304,544	27.3	19.5	7.9	−4.0	4.04	162,000			
1888	39,029,000	1,173,000	752,834	420,166	30.0	19.3	10.8	−1.1	4.43	326,000			
1889	39,473,000	1,210,000	808,680	401,320	30.7	20.5	10.2	1.7	4.54	444,000			
1890	39,902,000	1,145,000	823,718	321,282	28.7	20.6	8.1	2.1	4.18	429,000			
1891	40,251,000	1,087,000	853,139	233,861	27.0	21.2	5.8	4.2	3.99	349,000			
1892	40,508,000	1,207,000	886,988	320,012	29.8	21.9	7.9	−0.3	4.40	257,000			
1893	40,860,000	1,178,000	937,644	240,356	28.8	22.9	5.9	4.5	4.26	352,000			
1894	41,142,000	1,209,000	840,768	368,232	29.4	20.4	8.9	−1.3	4.35	282,000			
1895	41,557,000	1,246,000	852,422	393,578	30.0	20.5	9.5	1.1	4.36	415,000			
1896	41,992,000	1,282,000	912,822	369,178	30.5	21.7	8.8	3.1	4.51	435,000			
1897	42,400,000	1,334,000	876,837	457,163	31.5	20.7	10.8	−1.9	4.66	408,000			
1898	42,886,000	1,370,000	894,524	475,476	31.9	20.9	11.1	0.3	4.72	486,000			
1899	43,400,000	1,386,981	932,087	454,894	32.0	21.5	10.5	1.4	4.73	514,000	153.8		
1900	43,847,000	1,420,534	910,744	509,790	32.4	20.8	11.6	−1.4	4.69	447,000	155.0		
1901	44,359,000	1,501,591	925,810	575,781	33.9	20.9	13.0	−1.5	5.01	512,100	149.9		
1902	44,964,000	1,510,853	959,126	551,709	33.6	21.3	12.3	1.2	4.97	605,000	154.0		
1903	45,546,000	1,489,816	931,008	558,808	32.0	20.0	13.5	0.5	4.83	582,000	152.4		
1904	46,135,000	1,440,371	955,400	484,971	30.6	21.2	10.7	2.3	4.61	589,000	151.9		
1905	46,620,000	1,452,770	1,004,661	448,109	30.6	21.9	10.1	0.8	4.52	485,000	151.7		
1906	47,038,000	1,394,295	955,256	439,039	29.0	20.0	10.6	−0.5	4.38	418,000	153.6		
1907	47,416,000	1,614,472	1,016,798	597,674	33.2	21.0	13.9	−4.7	5.03	378,000	151.3		
1908	47,965,000	1,662,815	1,029,447	633,368	33.7	20.9	14.5	−1.8	5.13	549,000	158.0		
1909	48,554,000	1,693,850	1,091,264	602,586	33.9	21.9	13.8	−0.3	5.16	589,000	167.3		
1910	49,184,000	1,712,857	1,064,234	648,623	33.9	21.1	14.5	−0.4	5.01	630,000	161.2		
1911	49,852,000	1,747,803	1,043,906	703,897	34.1	20.4	15.5	−0.7	5.19	668,000	158.4		
1912	50,577,000	1,737,674	1,037,016	700,658	33.4	20.0	15.3	−0.5	5.08	725,000	154.2		
1913	51,305,000	1,757,441	1,027,257	730,184	33.3	19.5	15.6	0	5.07	728,000	152.1		
1914	52,039,000	1,808,402	1,101,815	706,587	33.8	20.6	14.9	0.5	5.14	734,000	158.5		
1915	52,752,000	1,799,326	1,093,793	705,533	33.2	20.2	14.4	0.1	4.91	713,000	160.4		
1916	53,496,000	1,804,822	1,187,832	616,990	32.9	21.6	12.7	2.4	4.98	744,000	170.3		
1917	54,134,000	1,812,413	1,199,669	612,744	32.7	21.6	12.5	0.5	4.95	738,000	173.2		
1918	54,739,000	1,791,992	1,493,162	298,830	32.2	26.7	6.4	5.7	4.83	605,000	188.6		
1919	55,033,000	1,778,685	1,281,965	496,720	31.6	22.8	10.2	−3.7	4.77	294,000	170.5		
1920	55,963,053	2,025,564	1,422,096	603,468	36.2	25.4	12.0	5.9	5.35	930,053	165.7		
1921	56,666,000	1,990,876	1,288,570	702,306	35.1	22.7	12.4	0.0	5.22	702,947	168.3		
1922	57,390,000	1,969,314	1,286,941	682,373	34.3	22.4	11.9	0.7	5.12	724,000	166.4		
1923	58,119,000	2,043,297	1,332,485	710,812	35.2	22.9	12.2	0.3	5.26	729,000	163.4		
1924	58,876,000	1,998,520	1,254,946	743,574	33.9	21.3	12.6	0.2	5.07	757,000	156.2		
1925	59,736,822	2,086,091	1,210,706	875,395	34.9	20.3	14.5	−0.2	5.10	860,822	142.4		
1926	60,741,000	2,104,405	1,160,734	943,671	34.6	19.1	15.5	1.0	5.19	1,004,178	137.5		
1927	61,659,300	2,060,737	1,214,323	846,414	33.4	19.7	13.7	1.2	5.00	918,000	141.6		
1928	62,595,300	2,135,852	1,236,711	899,141	34.1	19.8	14.4	0.6	5.09	936,000	136.7		
1929	63,461,000	2,077,026	1,261,228	815,798	32.7	19.9	12.9	0.8	4.87	866,000	142.1		
1930	64,450,005	2,085,101	1,170,867	914,234	32.4	18.2	14.2	1.2	4.70	989,005	124.1		
1931	65,457,500	2,102,784	1,240,891	861,893	32.1	19.0	13.2	2.3	4.76	1,006,995	131.5		
1932	66,433,800	2,182,742	1,175,344	1,007,398	32.9	17.7	15.2	−0.5	4.86	343,000	117.5		
1933	67,431,600	2,121,253	1,193,987	927,266	31.5	17.7	13.8	1.1	4.63	990,000	121.3		
1934	68,308,900	2,043,783	1,234,684	809,099	29.9	18.1	11.9	1.0	4.39	890,000	124.8		
1935	69,254,148	2,190,704	1,161,936	1,028,768	31.6	16.8	14.9	−1.2	4.59	574,148	106.7		
1936	70,113,600	2,101,969	1,230,278	871,691	30.0	17.5	12.4	−0.2	4.34	345,852	116.7	46.92	49.63
1937	70,630,400	2,180,734	1,207,899	972,835	30.9	17.1	13.7	−6.5	4.45	770,000	105.8		
1938	71,012,600	1,928,321	1,259,805	668,516	27.2	17.7	9.4	−4.1	3.88	230,000	114.4		
1939	71,379,700	1,901,573	1,268,760	632,813	26.6	17.8	8.8	−3.7	3.80	340,000	106.2		
1940	71,993,000	2,115,867	1,186,595	929,272	29.4	16.4	12.9	−4.4	4.11	2,184,308	90.0		
1941	71,678,000	2,277,283	1,149,559	1,127,724	31.1	15.7	15.4	−20.0	4.36	−364,308	84.1		
1942	72,386,000	2,233,660	1,166,630	1,067,030	30.3	15.8	14.4	−5.0	4.18	700,000	85.5		
1943	72,887,700	2,253,535	1,213,811	1,039,724	30.3	16.3	13.9	−7.4	4.11	530,000	86.6		
1944	73,064,000	2,149,843	1,279,639	870,204	29.2	17.4	11.8	−9.5	3.95	−115,000			
1945	71,998,104	1,685,583	2,113,798	–428,215	23.2	29.2	−5.9	−8.7	3.11	−1,866,896			
1946	73,114,000	1,905,809	1,326,592	579,217	25.3	17.6	7.7	7.5	3.37	3,301,896			
1947	78,101,000	2,678,792	1,138,238	1,540,554	34.3	14.6	19.7	47.1	4.541	2,725,000	76.7	50.06	53.96
1948	80,002,500	2,681,624	950,610	1,731,014	33.7	12.0	21.8	2.2	4.400	1,475,000	61.7	55.6	59.4
1949	81,772,600	2,696,638	945,444	1,751,194	33.2	11.6	21.5	0.2	4.316	1,800,000	62.5	56.2	59.8
1950	83,199,637	2,337,507	904,876	1,432,631	28.2	10.9	17.3	−0.1	3.650	1,899,637	60.1	58.0	61.5
1951	84,541,000	2,137,689	838,998	1,298,691	25.4	10.0	15.4	0.5	3.262	1,035,363	57.5	59.57	62.97
1952	85,808,000	2,005,162	765,068	1,240,094	23.5	8.9	14.5	0.3	2.976	1,268,000	49.4	61.9	65.5
1953	86,981,000	1,868,040	772,547	1,095,493	21.5	8.9	12.6	0.9	2.695	1,192,000	48.9	61.9	65.7
1954	88,239,000	1,769,580	721,491	1,048,089	20.1	8.2	11.9	2.4	2.481	1,281,000	44.6	63.41	67.69
1955	89,275,529	1,730,692	693,523	1,037,169	19.4	7.8	11.7	0	2.370	1,299,529	39.8	63.60	67.75
1956	90,172,000	1,665,278	724,460	940,818	18.5	8.1	10.5	−0.5	2.223	677,471	40.6	63.59	67.54
1957	90,928,000	1,566,713	752,445	814,268	17.3	8.3	9.0	−0.6	2.043	781,000	40.0	63.24	67.60
1958	91,767,000	1,653,469	684,189	969,280	18.1	7.5	10.6	−1.4	2.110	812,000	34.5	64.98	69.61
1959	92,641,000	1,626,088	689,959	936,129	17.6	7.5	10.1	−0.7	2.039	888,000	33.7	65.21	69.88
1960	93,418,501	1,606,041	706,599	899,442	17.3	7.6	9.7	−1.3	2.004	984,501	30.7	65.32	70.19
1961	94,287,000	1,589,372	695,644	893,728	17.0	7.4	9.6	−0.3	1.961	1,524,499	28.6	66.03	70.79
1962	95,181,000	1,618,616	710,265	908,351	17.1	7.5	9.6	−0.2	1.976	889,000	26.4	66.23	71.16
1963	96,156,000	1,659,521	670,770	988,751	17.4	7.0	10.4	−0.1	2.005	980,000	23.2	67.21	72.34
1964	97,182,000	1,716,761	673,067	1,043,694	17.8	6.9	10.8	−0.2	2.049	1,014,000	20.4	67.67	72.87
1965	98,274,961	1,823,697	700,438	1,123,259	18.7	7.1	11.5	−0.3	2.139	448,961	18.5	67.74	72.92
1966	99,036,000	1,360,974	670,342	690,632	13.8	6.8	7.1	0.7	1.578	1,515,039	19.3	68.35	73.61
1967	100,196,000	1,935,647	675,006	1,260,641	19.4	6.7	12.7	−1.0	2.226	935,000	14.9	68.91	74.15
1968	101,331,000	1,871,839	686,555	1,185,284	18.5	6.8	11.8	−0.5	2.134	1,336,000	15.3	69.05	74.30
1969	102,536,000	1,889,815	693,787	1,196,028	18.5	6.8	11.7	0.1	2.131	1,111,000	14.2	69.18	74.67
1970	103,720,060	1,934,239	712,962	1,221,277	18.7	6.9	11.9	−0.4	2.135	548,060	13.1	69.31	74.66
1971	105,145,000	2,000,973	684,521	1,316,452	19.1	6.5	12.6	1.0	2.157	1,976,940	12.4	70.17	75.58
1972	107,595,000	2,038,682	683,751	1,354,931	19.2	6.4	12.8	10.4	2.142	1,491,000	11.7	70.50	75.94
1973	109,104,000	2,091,983	709,416	1,382,567	19.2	6.5	12.7	1.2	2.140	1,521,000	11.3	70.70	76.02
1974	110,573,000	2,029,989	710,510	1,319,479	18.4	6.4	12.0	1.4	2.049	1,453,000	10.8	71.16	76.31
1975	111,939,643	1,901,440	702,275	1,199,165	17.0	6.3	10.7	1.5	1.909	1,777,643	10.0	71.73	76.89
1976	113,094,000	1,832,617	703,270	1,129,347	16.3	6.2	10.0	0.2	1.852	835,357	9.3	72.15	77.35
1977	114,165,000	1,755,100	690,074	1,065,026	15.4	6.1	9.4	0.1	1.800	1,097,000	8.9	72.69	77.95
1978	115,190,000	1,708,643	695,821	1,012,822	14.9	6.1	8.8	0.1	1.792	662,000	8.4	72.97	78.33
1979	116,155,000	1,642,580	689,664	952,916	14.2	6.0	8.2	0.1	1.769	962,000	7.9	73.46	78.89
1980	117,060,396	1,576,889	722,801	854,088	13.6	6.2	7.3	0.4	1.747	1,104,396	7.5	73.35	78.76
1981	117,902,000	1,529,455	720,262	809,193	13.0	6.1	6.9	0.3	1.741	621,604	7.1	73.79	79.13
1982	118,728,000	1,515,392	711,883	803,509	12.8	6.0	6.8	0.2	1.770	821,000	6.6	74.22	79.66
1983	119,536,000	1,508,687	740,038	768,649	12.7	6.2	6.5	0.3	1.800	796,000	6.2	74.20	79.78
1984	120,305,000	1,489,780	740,247	749,533	12.5	6.2	6.3	0.2	1.811	654,000	6.0	74.54	80.18
1985	121,049,000	1,431,577	752,283	679,294	11.9	6.3	5.6	0.5	1.764	755,923	5.5	74.78	80.48
1986	121,660,000	1,382,946	750,620	632,326	11.4	6.2	5.2	−0.2	1.723	670,077	5.2	75.23	80.93
1987	122,239,000	1,346,658	751,172	595,486	11.1	6.2	4.9	−0.1	1.690	863,000	5.0	75.61	81.39
1988	122,745,000	1,314,006	793,014	520,992	10.8	6.5	4.3	−0.1	1.656	565,000	4.8	75.54	81.30
1989	123,205,000	1,246,802	788,594	458,208	10.2	6.4	3.7	0	1.572	609,000	4.6	75.91	81.77
1990	123,611,000	1,221,585	820,305	401,280	10.0	6.7	3.3	0	1.543	455,167	4.6	75.92	81.90
1991	124,101,000	1,223,245	829,797	393,448	9.9	6.7	3.2	0.8	1.533	511,833	4.4	76.11	82.11
1992	124,567,000	1,208,989	856,643	352,346	9.8	6.9	2.9	0.9	1.502	453,000	4.5	76.09	82.22
1993	124,928,000	1,188,282	878,532	309,750	9.6	7.1	2.5	0.4	1.458	431,000	4.3	76.25	82.51
1994	125,265,000	1,238,328	875,933	362,395	10.0	7.1	2.9	−0.2	1.500	452,000	4.2	76.57	82.98
1995	125,570,000	1,187,064	922,139	264,925	9.6	7.4	2.2	0.3	1.423	213,000	4.3	76.38	82.85
1996	125,859,000	1,206,555	896,211	310,344	9.7	7.2	2.5	−0.2	1.425	285,000	3.8	77.01	83.59
1997	126,157,000	1,191,665	913,402	278,263	9.5	7.3	2.2	0.2	1.388	300,000	3.7	77.19	83.82
1998	126,472,000	1,203,147	936,484	266,663	9.6	7.5	2.1	0.4	1.384	343,000	3.6	77.16	84.01
1999	126,767,000	1,177,669	982,031	195,638	9.4	7.8	1.6	0.8	1.342	231,000	3.4	77.10	83.99
2000	127,076,000	1,190,547	961,653	228,894	9.5	7.7	1.8	0.6	1.359	212,000	3.2	77.72	84.60
2001	127,291,000	1,170,662	970,331	200,331	9.3	7.7	1.6	0.1	1.334	306,000	3.1	78.07	84.93
2002	127,435,000	1,153,855	982,379	171,476	9.2	7.8	1.4	−0.2	1.319	296,000	3.0	78.32	85.23
2003	127,619,000	1,123,610	1,014,951	108,659	8.9	8.0	0.9	0.6	1.291	273,000	3.0	78.36	85.33
2004	127,687,000	1,110,721	1,028,602	82,119	8.8	8.2	0.6	−0.1	1.289	43,000	2.8	78.64	85.59
2005	127,768,000	1,062,530	1,083,796	−21,266	8.4	8.6	−0.2	0.8	1.260	12,000	2.8	78.56	85.52
2006	127,901,000	1,092,674	1,084,451	8,223	8.7	8.6	0.1	−0.0	1.317	81,000	2.6	79.00	85.81
2007	128,033,000	1,089,818	1,108,334	−18,516	8.6	8.8	−0.2	0.2	1.337	147,000	2.6	79.19	85.99
2008	128,084,000	1,091,156	1,142,407	−51,251	8.7	9.1	−0.4	−0.2	1.367	62,000	2.6	79.29	86.05
2009	128,032,000	1,070,036	1,141,865	−71,829	8.5	9.1	−0.6	−0.9	1.368	−52,000	2.4	79.59	86.44
2010	128,057,352	1,071,305	1,197,014	−125,709	8.5	9.5	−1.0	1.4	1.387	25,352	2.3	79.64	86.39
2011	127,834,000	1,050,807	1,253,068	−202,261	8.3	9.9	−1.6	−0.4	1.393	−222,648	2.3	79.44	85.90
2012	127,593,000	1,037,232	1,256,359	−219,127	8.2	10.0	−1.8	−0.4	1.405	−241,000	2.2	79.93	86.37
2013	127,414,000	1,029,817	1,268,438	−238,621	8.2	10.1	−1.9	1.7	1.427	−179,000	2.1	80.19	86.56
2014	127,237,000	1,003,609	1,273,025	−269,416	8.0	10.1	−2.1	2.0	1.423	−177,000	2.1	80.48	86.77
2015	127,094,745	1,005,721	1,290,510	−284,789	8.0	10.3	−2.3	1.0	1.451	−142,245	1.9	80.75	86.98
2016	127,042,000	977,242	1,308,158	−330,916	7.8	10.5	−2.7	1.2	1.442	−52,745	2.0	80.98	87.14
2017	126,919,000	946,146	1,340,567	−394,421	7.6	10.8	−3.2	2.1	1.428	−123,000	1.9	81.09	87.26
2018	126,749,000	918,397	1,362,482	−444,085	7.4	11.0	−3.6	3.0	1.416	−170,000	1.9	81.25	87.32
2019	126,555,000	865,239	1,381,093	−515,854	7.0	11.2	−4.2	1.8	1.361	−194,000	1.9	81.41	87.45
2020	126,146,099	840,832	1,372,648	−531,816	6.8	11.1	−4.3	1.0	1.330	−408,901	1.8	81.64	87.74
2021	125,502,000	811,604	1,439,809	−628,205	6.6	11.7	−5.1	2.3	1.303	−644,099	1.7	81.47	87.57
2022	124,947,000	770,759	1,569,050	−798,291	6.1	12.5	−6.4	1.9	1.257	−555,000	1.8	80.74	86.88
2023	124,352,000	727,277	1,575,936	−848,659	5.8	12.7	−6.9	0.9	1.201	−595,000	1.8	81.09	87.14
2024	123,802,000	686,061	1,605,298	−919,237	5.5	12.9	−7.4	3.0	1.147	−550,000	1.8	81.09	87.13
2025	123,049,524	671,236	1,589,489	−918,253	5.5	12.9	−7.4	1.3	1.135	–752,476	1.9	81.35	87.33
2026	122,690,000									–359,524			

View source data.

=== Current vital statistics ===
Period	Live births	Deaths	Natural increase
January–August 2025	464,517	1,079,279	−614,762
January–August 2026	464,110	1,025,118	−561,008
Difference	▼ −407 (−0.1%)	▼ −54,161 (−5.0%)	▲ +53,754

=== Total fertility rate by prefecture ===
2025
Prefecture	TFR
Okinawa	1.52
Miyazaki	1.46
Fukui	1.45
Nagasaki	1.42
Shimane	1.41
Kagawa	1.40
Kumamoto	1.40
Tottori	1.38
Saga	1.38
Kagoshima	1.38
Shiga	1.34
Tokushima	1.33
Oita	1.33
Yamaguchi	1.32
Toyama	1.31
Ishikawa	1.30
Kochi	1.29
Ehime	1.28
Hiroshima	1.27
Mie	1.26
Nagano	1.25
Wakayama	1.24
Hyogo	1.23
Gifu	1.23
Okayama	1.23
Yamanashi	1.23
Shizuoka	1.21
Fukuoka	1.21
Aichi	1.20
Gunma	1.18
Nara	1.17
Ibaraki	1.15
Yamagata	1.15
Tochigi	1.14
Fukushima	1.14
Japan	1.14
Osaka	1.13
Niigata	1.13
Iwate	1.12
Aomori	1.10
Chiba	1.07
Saitama	1.06
Akita	1.05
(Kanagawa Prefecture) Kanagawa	1.05
Kyoto	1.03
Hokkaido	1.00
Miyagi	1.00
Tokyo	0.96

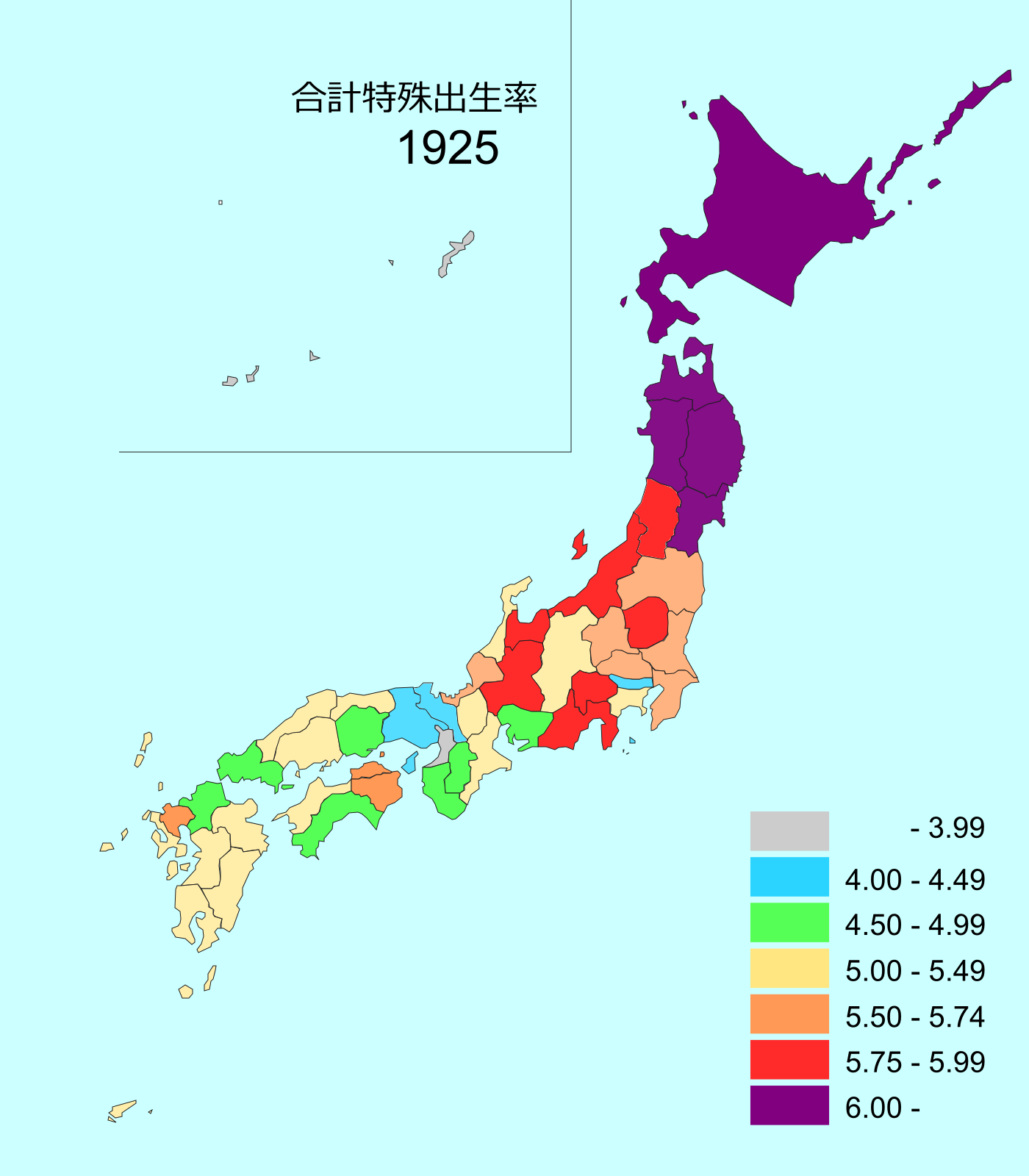
The map of total fertility rates by prefecture in 1925 shows a clear trend of lower fertility in the west and higher in the east.

The Total Fertility Rate (TFR) exhibits notable regional disparities across Japan's prefectures. Historically, Tohoku and Hokkaido regions have maintained the highest TFR, while Okinawa and Kyushu regions have generally recorded the lowest.

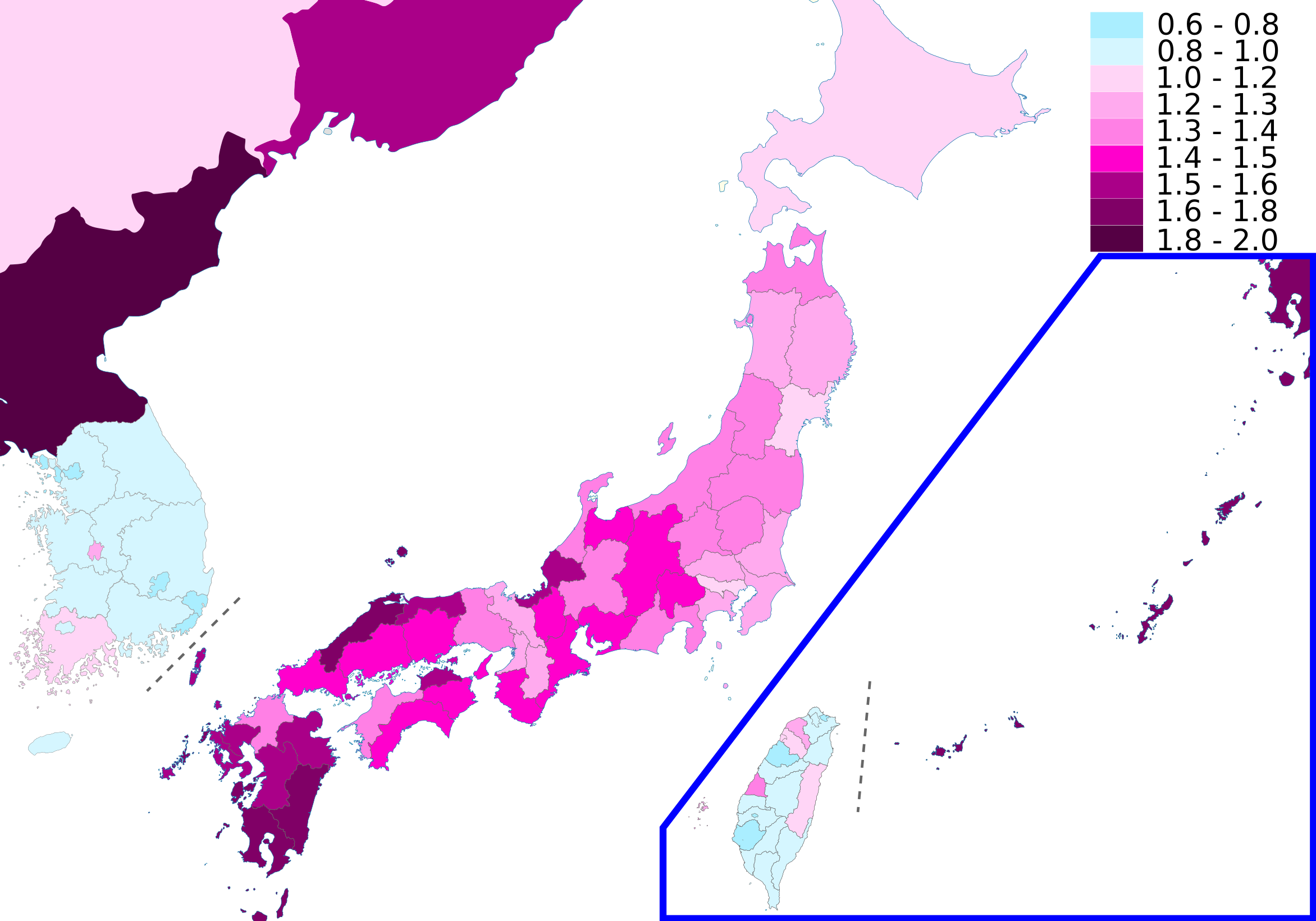
A map of East Asia by total fertility rate (TFR) in 2021. Japan's TFR in 2012 was estimated at 1.41 children per woman, increasing slightly from 1.32 in the 2001–05 period. In 2012, the highest TFR was 1.90, in Okinawa, and the lowest was 1.09, in Tokyo. TFR by prefecture for 2000–05, as well as future estimates, have been released.

In the 1970s, Akita Prefecture registered the nation's lowest rate (1.88, compared to Tokyo's 1.96). In recent years, this pattern has largely persisted. In 2021, Okinawa Prefecture led the nation with a TFR of 1.80, followed by Kagoshima and Miyazaki Prefectures. Tokyo Metropolis recorded the lowest TFR at 1.08, with Miyagi Prefecture and Hokkaido following.

The specific causes underlying these regional variations in birth rates are complex and not fully elucidated. For instance, the contrast between the high birth rates observed in the Kyushu and Okinawa regions and the low rates in Hokkaido and Tōhoku is often attributed to a combination of socio-economic and cultural factors. These include the prevalence of living with or near parents (multi-generational households), regional values concerning childbirth and child-rearing, and specific local traditions.

In large urban areas, including the Tokyo metropolitan area and other designated cities, the average age at first marriage and the average age at first birth are significantly higher than the respective prefectural and national averages. This delay in life milestones is considered a primary contributor to the lower birth rates observed in these regions. The rate of college graduates, particularly for women, is typically higher in these urban centers. This leads to an observed negative correlation between TFR and college graduates rates, suggesting that higher educational attainment is associated with lower fertility rates at the regional level.

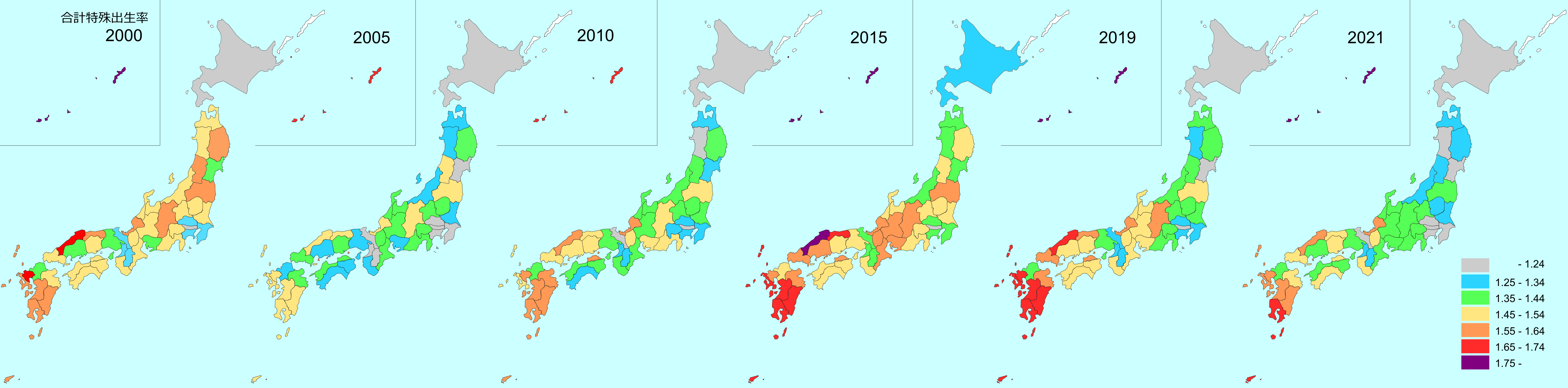
Total Fertility Rate by Prefecture, 2000 to 2021

=== Total fertility rate ===
==== Total Fertility rate before 1873 ====
Japan's total fertility rate, 1800 to 2016

Source: Our world in data

The total fertility rate (TFR) in Japan before 1873 fluctuated. Several estimates for the period of the early to mid-19th century range from around 3.6 to 4.8 children per woman. During the 17th and 18th centuries, local studies suggest TFR was even lower in some areas, with completed family sizes often averaging 3 to 4 children.

Years	1800	1801	1802	1803	1804	1805	1806	1807	1808	1809	1810
Total Fertility Rate in Japan	4.08	4.11	4.14	4.17	4.20	4.22	4.25	4.28	4.31	4.34	4.37

Years	1811	1812	1813	1814	1815	1816	1817	1818	1819	1820
Total Fertility Rate in Japan	4.00	4.43	4.43	4.44	4.44	4.45	4.45	4.45	4.46	4.46

Years	1821	1822	1823	1824	1825	1826	1827	1828	1829	1830
Total Fertility Rate in Japan	4.47	4.47	4.48	4.48	4.48	4.49	4.49	4.50	4.50	4.51

Years	1831	1832	1833	1834	1835	1836	1837	1838	1839	1840
Total Fertility Rate in Japan	4.51	4.51	4.52	4.52	4.53	4.53	4.54	4.54	4.55	4.56

Years	1841	1842	1843	1844	1845	1846	1847	1848	1849	1850
Total Fertility Rate in Japan	4.58	4.59	4.60	4.61	4.62	4.64	4.65	4.66	4.67	4.68

Years	1851	1852	1853	1854	1855	1856	1857	1858	1859	1860
Total Fertility Rate in Japan	4.70	4.71	4.72	4.73	4.74	4.76	4.77	4.78	4.79	4.80

Years	1861	1862	1863	1864	1865	1866	1867	1868	1869	1870
Total Fertility Rate in Japan	4.82	4.83	4.84	4.70	4.55	4.41	4.27	4.13	3.98	3.84

Years	1871	1872	1873
Total Fertility Rate in Japan	3.70	3.56	3.41

In 2023, Japan's total fertility rate was 1.20, among the lowest in the world and far below the replacement rate of 2.1. In January 2023, Japanese Prime Minister Fumio Kishida pledged to take urgent steps to tackle Japan's declining birth rate, calling it "now or never" for Japan's aging society. He planned to double the budget for child-related policies by June 2023 and to set up a new government agency in April.

The number of births by age groups in Japan, 1975 to 2007

=== Life expectancy ===
Life expectancy in Japan, 1865 to 2023.

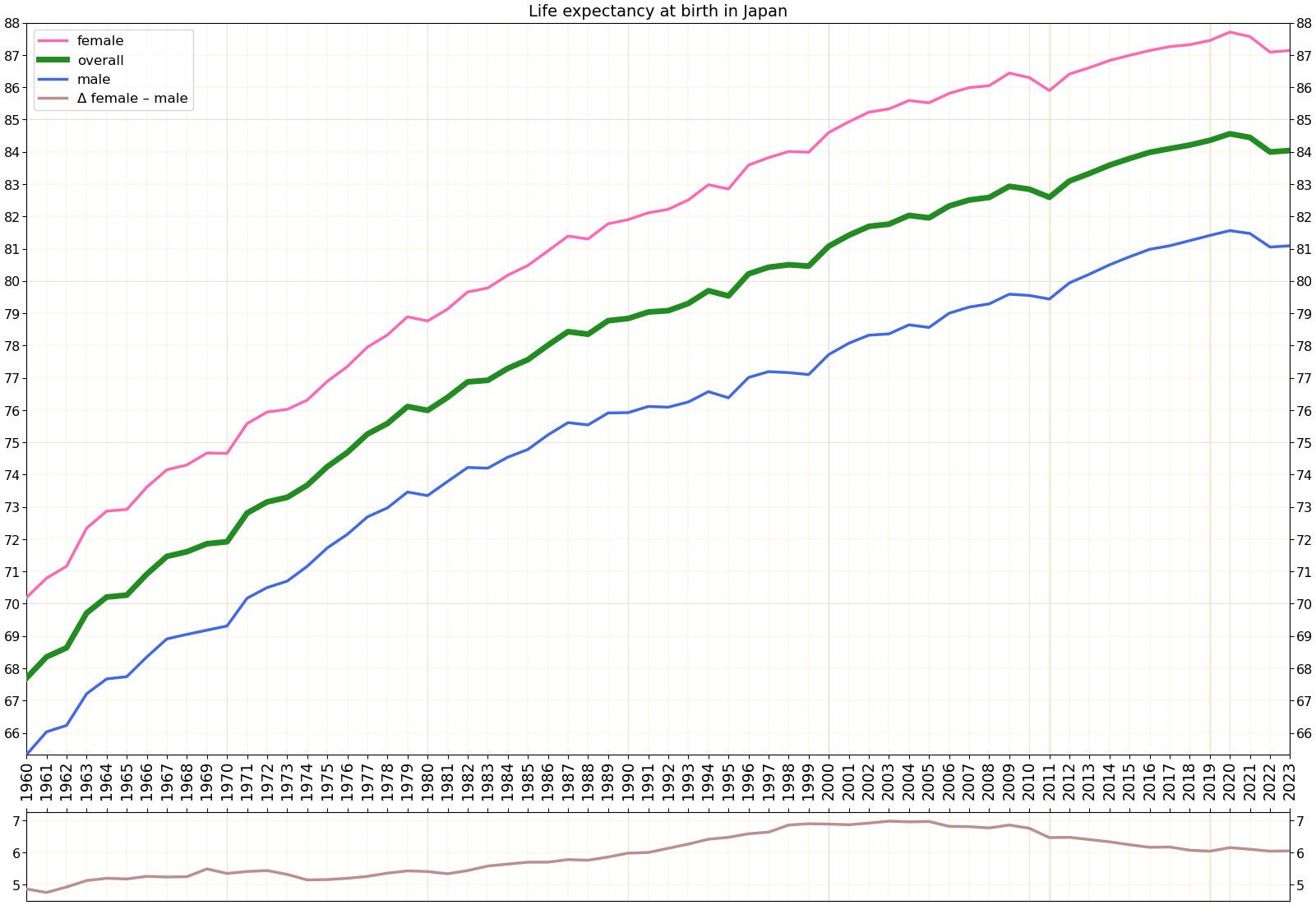
Life expectancy in Japan by gender, 1960 to 2023.

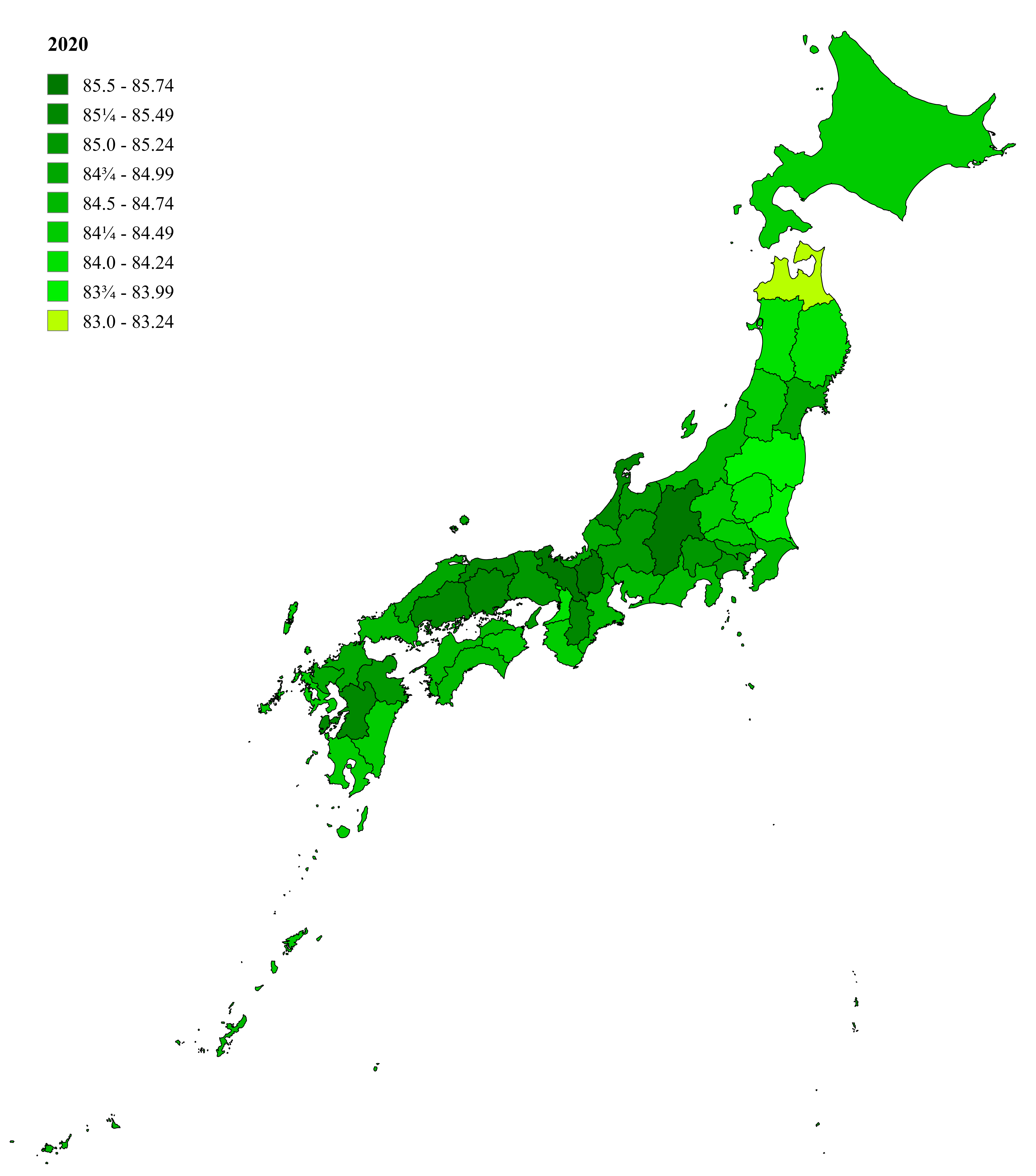
A map of life expectancy in Japan, 2020.

Japan consistently ranks among the highest in the world for overall life expectancy, holding the top position for women and one of the highest for men. As of 2024 data, life expectancy is approximately 87.13 years for females and 81.09 years for males. Historically, life expectancy was much lower, with a significant increase after World War II.

Before World War II, Japan's life expectancy was significantly lower than its current, world-leading figures, but it was already steadily improving from the late 19th century onward. Throughout the first half of the 20th century, life expectancy remained under 50 years for both men and women. The progress during this period was primarily driven by initial reductions in mortality from infectious and parasitic diseases.

Following the end of World War II, Japan experienced a rapid and sustained increase in longevity, driven initially by a sharp decline in infectious disease mortality and later by advancements in chronic disease management. universal health coverage and government-led campaigns targeting non-communicable diseases (NCDs), notably through salt-reduction efforts to combat stroke.

Age	2010				2020				2023			
Age	overall	male	female	sex gap	overall	male	female	sex gap	overall	male	female	sex gap
0	82.95	79.51	86.24	6.73	84.71	81.58	87.73	6.15	84.14	81.10	87.16	6.06
1	82.14	78.71	85.43	6.72	83.86	80.73	86.89	6.16	83.29	80.25	86.31	6.06
5	78.22	74.79	81.49	6.70	79.91	76.78	82.92	6.14	79.35	76.30	82.37	6.07
10	73.25	69.82	76.53	6.71	74.93	71.80	77.95	6.15	74.37	71.33	77.39	6.06
15	68.28	64.86	71.55	6.69	69.96	66.83	72.98	6.15	69.41	66.36	72.43	6.07
20	63.36	59.95	66.61	6.66	65.03	61.92	68.03	6.11	64.49	61.45	67.50	6.05
25	58.49	55.13	61.69	6.56	60.15	57.07	63.11	6.04	59.60	56.59	62.59	6.00
30	53.62	50.30	56.78	6.48	55.26	52.20	58.19	5.99	54.71	51.73	57.67	5.94
35	48.77	45.48	51.89	6.41	50.38	47.35	53.27	5.92	49.84	46.88	52.76	5.88
40	43.95	40.69	47.03	6.34	45.52	42.52	48.39	5.87	44.99	42.06	47.88	5.82
45	39.20	35.98	42.21	6.23	40.72	37.74	43.55	5.81	40.19	37.29	43.03	5.74
50	34.54	31.39	37.46	6.07	36.00	33.06	38.77	5.71	35.46	32.60	38.25	5.65
55	30.00	26.95	32.80	5.85	31.39	28.52	34.08	5.56	30.86	28.06	33.56	5.50
60	25.62	22.71	28.22	5.51	26.91	24.15	29.45	5.30	26.38	23.69	28.94	5.25
65	21.41	18.70	23.74	5.04	22.58	19.99	24.90	4.91	22.06	19.54	24.40	4.86
70	17.38	14.92	19.37	4.45	18.47	16.11	20.48	4.37	17.95	15.66	19.98	4.32
75	13.59	11.40	15.21	3.81	14.62	12.56	16.24	3.68	14.13	12.15	15.77	3.62
80	10.22	8.36	11.40	3.04	11.08	9.36	12.28	2.92	10.65	9.01	11.85	2.84
85	7.38	5.94	8.08	2.14	7.98	6.61	8.77	2.16	7.61	6.34	8.38	2.04
90	5.11	4.14	5.47	1.33	5.53	4.54	5.94	1.40	5.19	4.29	5.59	1.30
95	3.48	2.89	3.63	0.74	3.75	3.11	3.91	0.80	3.50	2.95	3.65	0.70
100	2.38	2.09	2.43	0.34	2.52	2.19	2.58	0.39	2.36	2.08	2.40	0.32
105	1.73	1.61	1.74	0.13	1.79	1.65	1.80	0.15	1.69	1.58	1.69	0.11
110	1.36	1.34	1.36	0.02	1.39	1.34	1.39	0.05	1.33	1.30	1.33	0.03

Data source: National Institute of Population and Social Security Research

==== Historical data ====
Sources: Our World In Data and the United Nations.

1865–1949

Years	1865	1870	1875	1880	1885	1890	1895	1900	1905	1910	1915	1920	1922	1927	1935	1945	1947	1948	1949	1950
Life expectancy in Japan	36.4	36.6	36.8	37.0	37.3	37.7	38.1	38.6	39.2	40.0	40.9	42.0	42.6	45.7	48.2	30.5	51.7	56.8	57.7	59.2

1950–2020

Period	Life expectancy in years	Period	Life expectancy in years
1950–1955	62.8	1985–1990	78.5
1955–1960	66.4	1990–1995	79.4
1960–1965	69.2	1995–2000	80.5
1965–1970	71.4	2000–2005	81.8
1970–1975	73.3	2005–2010	82.7
1975–1980	75.4	2010–2015	83.3
1980–1985	77.0	2015–2020	84.4

Source: UN World Population Prospects

=== Marriages and divorce ===
The percentage of births to unmarried women in selected countries, 1980 and 2007. As can be seen in the figure, Japan has not followed the trend of other industrialized countries of children born outside of marriage to the same degree.

Many Japanese lead a sexless marriage. Japan has the lowest level of couples having sex at 45 times per year, well below the global average of 103 times. With reasons of "tired" and "bored with intercourse" usually given as an answer. Despite this, Japan ranks as number two globally on the amount spent on pornography, after South Korea.

Marriage and divorce statistics

Marriages in Japan, 1975 to 2020

The marriage rate per 1,000 people in Japan, 1978 to 2020

The average age of first marriage in Japan, 1975 to 2020

The number of divorces in Japan, 1975 to 2020

Divorce rates per 1,000 of the total population, 1978 to 2020

== Ethnic groups ==
Naturalized Japanese citizens and native-born Japanese nationals with a multi-ethnic background are all considered to be Japanese in the population census of Japan.

=== Discrimination against ethnic minorities ===
Three native Japanese minority groups can be identified. The largest are the hisabetsu buraku or "discriminated communities", also known as the burakumin. These descendants of premodern outcast hereditary occupational groups, such as butchers, leatherworkers, funeral directors, and certain entertainers, may be considered a Japanese analog of India's Dalits. Historically, discrimination against these occupational groups was based on Buddhist prohibitions on killing and Shinto notions of pollution, and it was also a feature of governmental social control.

During the Edo period, such people were required to live in special buraku and, like the rest of the population, they were bound by sumptuary laws which were based on the inheritance of social class. The Meiji government abolished most of the derogatory names which were applied to these discriminated communities in 1871, but the new laws had little effect on the social discrimination which was faced by the former outcasts and their descendants. However, the laws eliminated the economic monopoly which they had on certain occupations. The buraku continued to be treated as social outcasts and some casual interactions with the majority caste were perceived taboo until the era after World War II.

Estimates of their number range from 2 to 4 million, about 4% of the national population in 2022. Although the members of these marginalized communities are physically indistinguishable from other Japanese, most of them live in urban ghettoes or they live in the traditional special hamlets which are located in rural areas, and as a result, membership in a marginalized group can be surmised from the location of a family's home, a family's occupation, the dialect which a family speaks, or the mannerisms which a family uses when it communicates with people. Checks on the backgrounds of families which were designed to ferret out buraku were commonly performed as a condition of marriage arrangements and employment applications, but in Osaka, they have been illegal since 1985.

Among the hisabetsu buraku, past and current discrimination against them has resulted in lower educational attainments and it has also resulted in a lower socioeconomic status, by contrast, the majority of Japanese have higher educational attainments and they also have a higher economic status. Movements with objectives which range from "liberation" to the encouragement of integration have attempted to change this situation, with some success. Nadamoto Masahisa of the Buraku History Institute estimates that as of 1998, between 60 and 80% of burakumin married a non-burakumin.

=== Ryukyuans ===
One of the largest minority groups among Japanese citizens is the Ryukyuan people. They are primarily distinguished by their use of several distinct Ryukyuan languages, though use of Ryukyuan is dying out. The Ryukyuan people and language originated in the Ryukyu Islands, which are in Okinawa prefecture and Kagoshima Prefecture.

=== Ainu ===
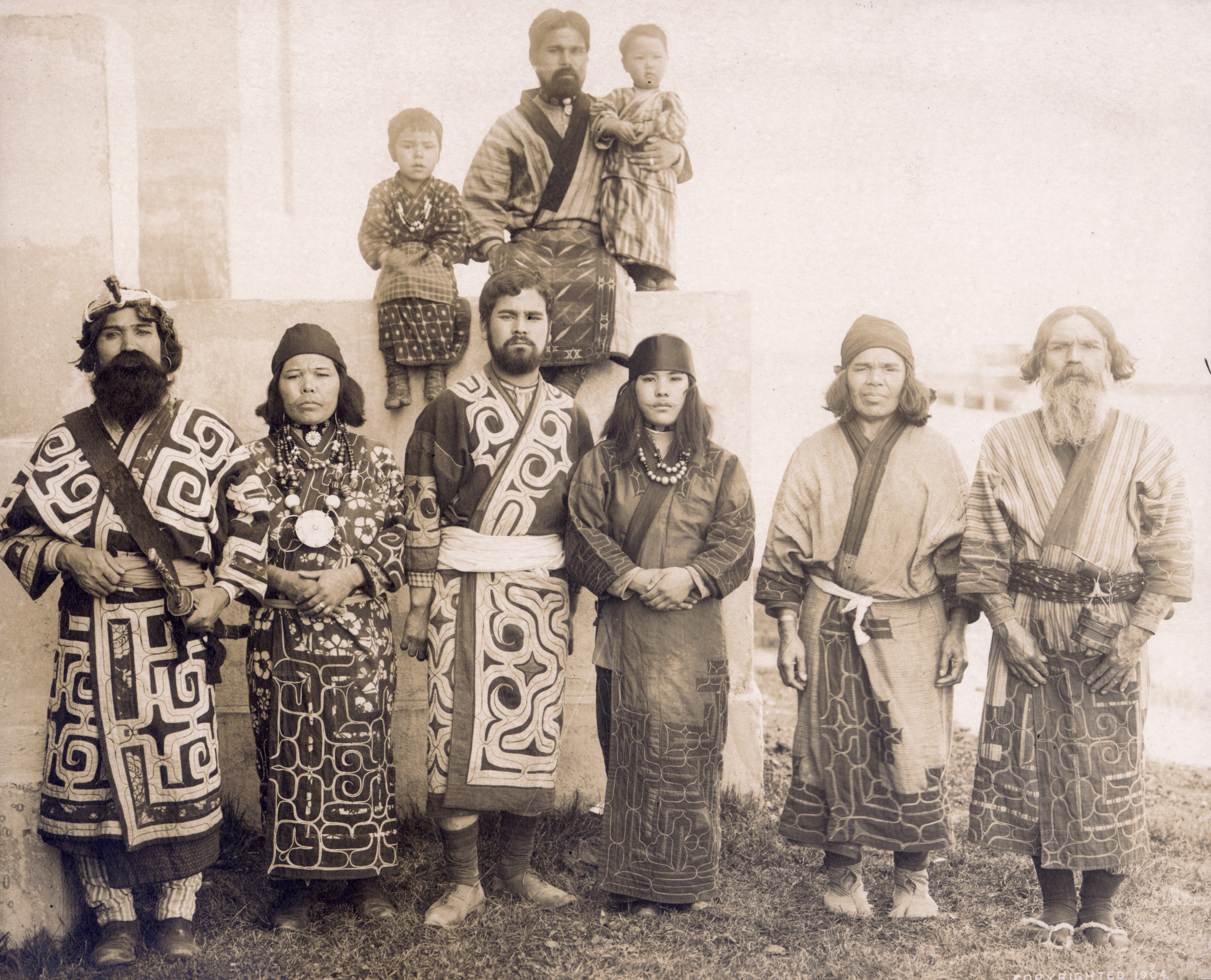
A group of Japanese Ainu in 1904

The third largest minority group among Japanese citizens is the Ainu, whose language is an isolate. Historically, the Ainu were an indigenous hunting and gathering population who occupied most of northern Honshū as late as the Nara period (A.D. 710–94). As Japanese settlement expanded, the Ainu were pushed northward, by the Tokugawa shogunate, the Ainu were pushed into the island of Hokkaido.

Characterized as remnants of a primitive circumpolar culture, the fewer than 20,000 Ainu in 1990 were considered racially distinct and thus not fully Japanese. Disease and a low birth rate had severely diminished their numbers over the past two centuries, and intermarriage had brought about an almost completely mixed population.

Although no longer in daily use, the Ainu language is preserved in epics, songs, and stories transmitted orally over succeeding generations. Distinctive rhythmic music and dances and some Ainu festivals and crafts are preserved, but mainly in order to take advantage of tourism.

=== Hāfu ===
Hāfu (a kana rendition of "half") is a term used for people who are biracial and ethnically half Japanese. Of the one million children born in Japan in 2013, 2.2% had one or two non-Japanese parents.^{[70]} In 2016, one in forty-nine babies born in Japan were born into families with one non-Japanese parent. Most intermarriages in Japan are between Japanese men and women from other Asian countries, including China, the Philippines and South Korea. Southeast Asia also has significant populations of people with half-Japanese ancestry, particularly in the Philippines, Indonesia, Malaysia, Singapore and Thailand.

In the 1940s, biracial Japanese children (Ainoko), specifically Amerasian children, encountered social problems such as poverty, perception of impurity and discrimination due to negative treatment in Japan. In the 21st century, discrimination against hāfu occurs based on how different their identity, behavior and appearance is from a typical Japanese person.

== Languages ==
The most widely-spoken language in Japan is Japanese, which is separated into several dialects, of which the Tokyo dialect considered to be Standard Japanese.

In addition to the Japanese language, Ryūkyūan languages are spoken in Okinawa and parts of Kagoshima in the Ryūkyū Islands. Along with Japanese, these languages are part of the Japonic language family, but they are separate languages, and are not mutually intelligible with Japanese, or with each other. All of the spoken Ryukyuan languages are classified by UNESCO as endangered.

In Hokkaidō, there is the Ainu language, which is spoken by the Ainu people, who are the indigenous people of the island. The Ainu languages, of which Hokkaidō Ainu is the only extant variety, are isolated and do not fall under any language family. Ever since the Meiji period, Japanese has become widely used among the Ainu people and consequently Ainu languages have been classified critically endangered by UNESCO.

Languages such as Orok, Evenki and Nivkh spoken in formerly Japanese controlled southern Sakhalin are becoming more endangered. After the Soviet Union took control of the region, speakers of these languages and their descendants migrated to mainland Japan and still exist in small numbers.

The Japanese society of Yamato people is linguistically homogeneous with small populations of Koreans (0.9 million), Chinese/Taiwanese (0.65 million), Filipino (306,000 some being Japanese Filipino; children of Japanese and Filipino parentage). This can be also said for Brazilians (300,000, many of whom are ethnically Japanese) as well as Peruvians and Argentineans of both Latin American and Japanese descent. Japan has indigenous minority groups such as the Ainu and Ryukyuans, who generally speak Japanese.

== Citizenship ==
Japanese citizenship is conferred jure sanguinis, and monolingual Japanese-speaking minorities often reside in Japan for generations under permanent residency status without acquiring citizenship in their country of birth, although legally they are allowed to do so. This is because Japanese law does not recognize dual citizenship after the age of adulthood, and so people becoming naturalized Japanese citizens must relinquish their previous citizenship upon reaching the age of 22 years.

People taking Japanese citizenship must take a name using one or more of the Japanese character sets (hiragana, katakana, kanji). Names written in the Western alphabet, Korean alphabet, Arabic characters, etc., are not acceptable as legal names. Chinese characters are usually legally acceptable, as nearly all Chinese characters are recognized as valid by the Japanese government. Transliterations of non-Japanese names using katakana (e.g. スミス "Sumisu" for "Smith") are also legally acceptable.

However, some naturalizing foreigners feel that becoming a Japanese citizen should mean that they have a Japanese name and that they should abandon their foreign name, and some foreign residents do not wish to do this—although most Special Permanent Resident Koreans and Chinese already use Japanese names. Nonetheless, some 10,000 Zainichi Koreans naturalize every year. Approximately 98.6% of the population are Japanese citizens, and 99% of the population speak Japanese as their first language. Non-ethnic Japanese in the past, and to an extent in the present, also live in small numbers in the Japanese archipelago.

== Religion ==
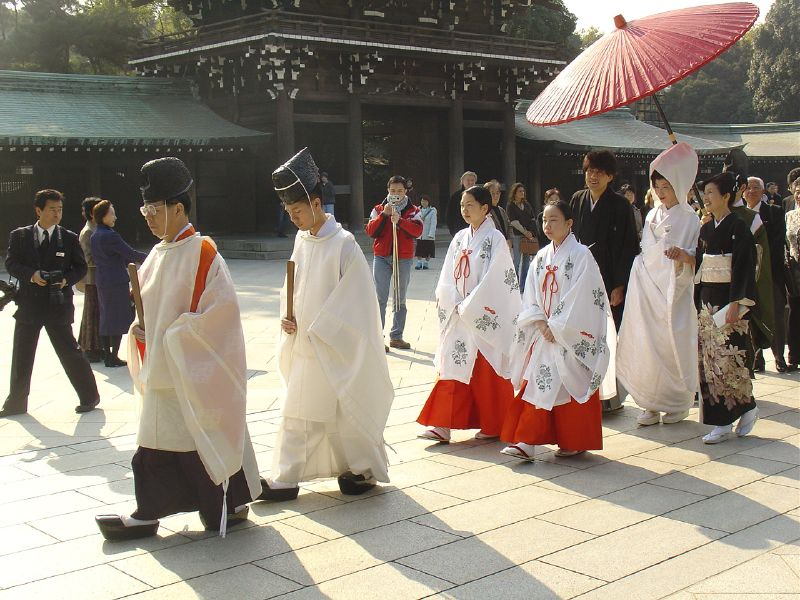
A Shinto wedding at the Meiji Shrine

Religion in Japan, 2020.
1. Buddhism (55.7%)
2. New Religion (26.2%)
3. Christianity (2.18%)
4. Shintoism (2.12%)
5. Chinese folk religion (0.48%)
6. Islam (0.15%)
7. None (12.9%)
8. Other (0.23%)

Shinto and Buddhism are Japan's two major religions. They have co-existed for more than a thousand years. Most Japanese people generally do not exclusively identify themselves as adherents of one religion, but rather incorporate various elements in a syncretic fashion. There are small Christian and other minorities as well, with the Christian population dating to as early as the 1500s, as a result of European missionary work before sakoku was implemented from 1635 to 1853.

== Migration ==
=== Internal migration ===
In the 1980s, between 6 million and 7 million people moved their residences each year. About 50% of these moves were within the same prefecture. The others were relocations from one prefecture to another. During Japan's economic development in the twentieth century, and especially during the 1950s and 1960s, migration was characterized by urbanization as people from rural areas in increasing numbers moved to the larger metropolitan areas in search of better jobs and education. Out-migration from rural prefectures continued in the late 1980s, but more slowly than in previous decades.

In the 1980s, government policy provided support for new urban development away from the large cities, particularly Tokyo, and assisted regional cities to attract young people to live and work there. Regional cities offered familiarity to those from nearby areas, lower costs of living, shorter commutes, and, in general, a more relaxed lifestyle than could be had in larger cities. Young people continued to move to large cities to attend universities and find work, but some returned to regional cities, a pattern known as U-turn, or to their prefecture of origin (referred to as "J-turn"), or even moved to a rural area for the first time ("I-turn").

In the 1980s, significant numbers of people left the largest central cities, Tokyo and Osaka, to move to suburbs within their metropolitan areas. In 1988, more than 500,000 people left Tokyo, which experienced a net loss through migration of nearly 73,000 for the year. Osaka had a net loss of nearly 36,000 in the same year.

With a decreasing total population, internal migration results in only eight prefectures showing an increase in population. These are Okinawa (2.9%), Tokyo (2.7%), Aichi (1.0%), Saitama (1.0%), Kanagawa (0.9%), Fukuoka (0.6%), Shiga (0.2%), and Chiba (0.1%).

=== Emigration ===
In 1975, about 663,300 Japanese were living abroad, approximately 75,000 of whom had permanent foreign residency, more than six times the number who had that status. In 1990, more than 200,000 Japanese went abroad for extended periods of study, research, or business assignments. As the government and private corporations have stressed internationalization, greater numbers of individuals have been directly affected, decreasing Japan's historical insularity. By the late 1980s, these problems, particularly the bullying of returnee children in schools, had become a major public issue both in Japan and in Japanese communities abroad.

Countries with significant populations of Japanese nationals in 2024
Country	Expatriates	Permanent expatriates
United States	413,380	230,378
Australia	104,141	64,070
China	97,538	5,992
Canada	77,294	52,457
Thailand	70,421	2,554
United Kingdom	64,066	29,449
Brazil	46,577	42,017
Germany	43,513	18,738
South Korea	43,064	16,631
France	37,056	15,585
Singapore	32,565	4,852
Taiwan	21,696	7,128
New Zealand	20,318	12,200
Malaysia	20,025	2,009
Vietnam	17,410	515
Indonesia	14,934	1,809
Switzerland	12,085	7,936
Italy	11,937	6,577
Netherlands	10,656	2,928
Argentina	10,528	10,177

Note: The above data shows the number of Japanese nationals living overseas. It was published by the Ministry of Foreign Affairs of Japan.

=== Immigration ===
According to the Japanese immigration centre, the number of foreign residents in Japan has steadily increased, and the number of foreign residents exceeded 4,125,395 people in December 2025.

In December 2025, the number of foreigners in Japan was 4,125,395. This includes 356,579 Filipinos, many of whom are married to Japanese nationals and possessing some degree of Japanese ancestry, 930,428 Chinese, 681,100 Vietnamese, 407,341 South Koreans, 300,992 Nepalis and 266,069 Indonesians. Chinese, Vietnamese, Koreans, Filipinos, Nepalis and Indonesians account for about 71.33% of foreign residents in Japan.

The current issue of the shrinking workforce in Japan alongside its aging population has resulted in a recent need to attract foreign labour to Japan. Reforms which took effect in 2015 relaxed visa requirements for "Highly Skilled Foreign Professionals" and create a new type of residence status with an unlimited period of stay.

The number of naturalized individuals peaked in 2003 at 17,633, before declining to 9,258 by 2025. Most of the decline is accounted for by a steep reduction in the number of Japan-born Koreans taking Japanese citizenship. Historically the bulk of those taking Japanese citizenship have not been foreign-born immigrants, but Japanese-born descendants of Koreans and Taiwanese who lost their citizenship in the Japanese Empire in 1947 as part of the American Occupation policy for Japan.

Japanese statistical authorities do not collect information on ethnicity, only nationality. As a result, both native and naturalized Japanese citizens are counted in a single group. Although official statistics therefore show homogeneity, other analyses describe the population as "multi-ethnic".

=== Net Migration ===
Net Migration to Japan (2001–present)
Year	Net Migration
2001	145,781
2002	−50,788
2003	67,832
2004	−35,076
2005	−52,729
2006	1,221
2007	3,598
2008	−44,626
2009	−123,748
2010	14
2011	−78,984
2012	−78,805
2013	14,378
2014	36,386
2015	94,438
2016	133,892
2017	150,727
2018	161,456
2019	208,783
2020	41,907
2021	−35,188
2022	175,115
2023	242,131
2024	339,843

==== Foreign residents ====
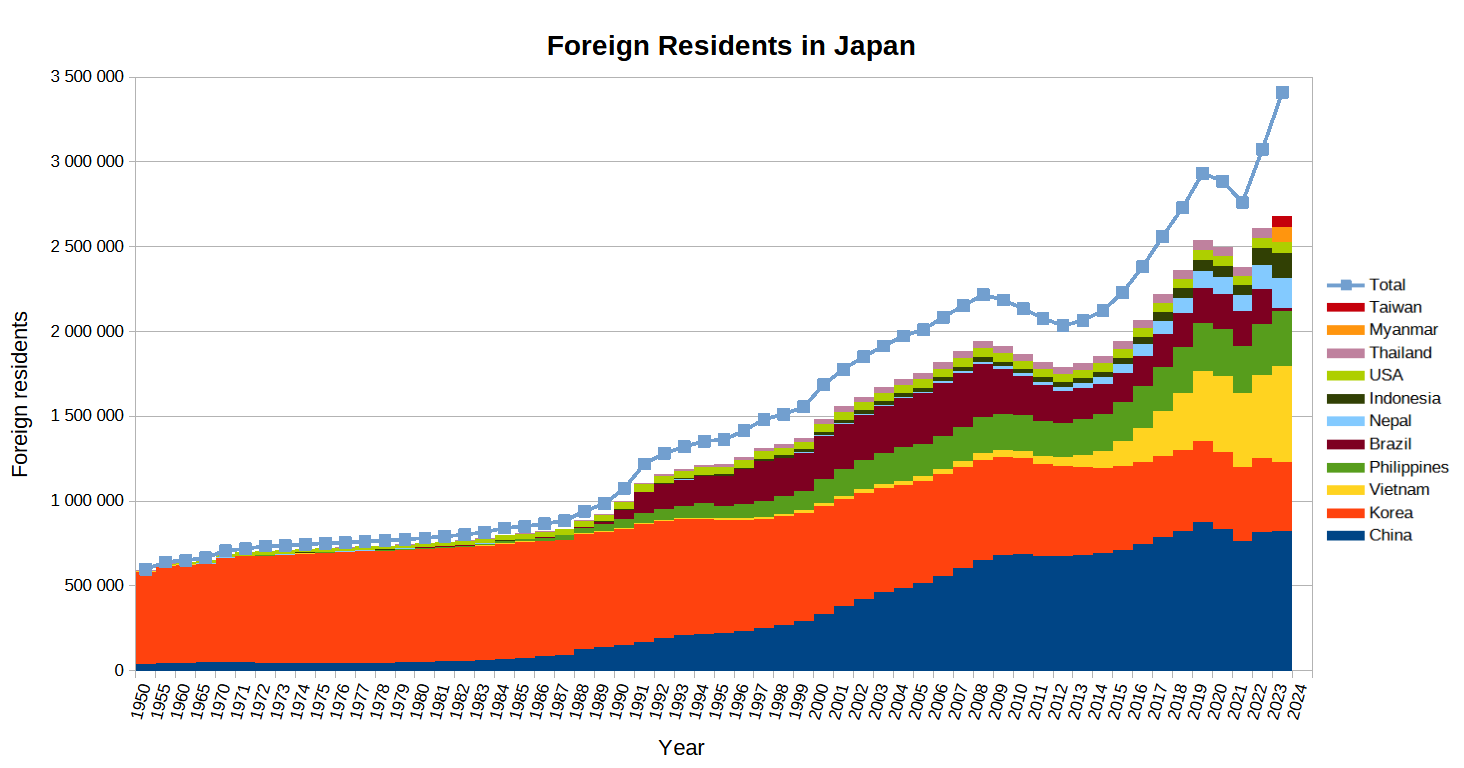
Foreign residents in Japan by source country, 1950–2024

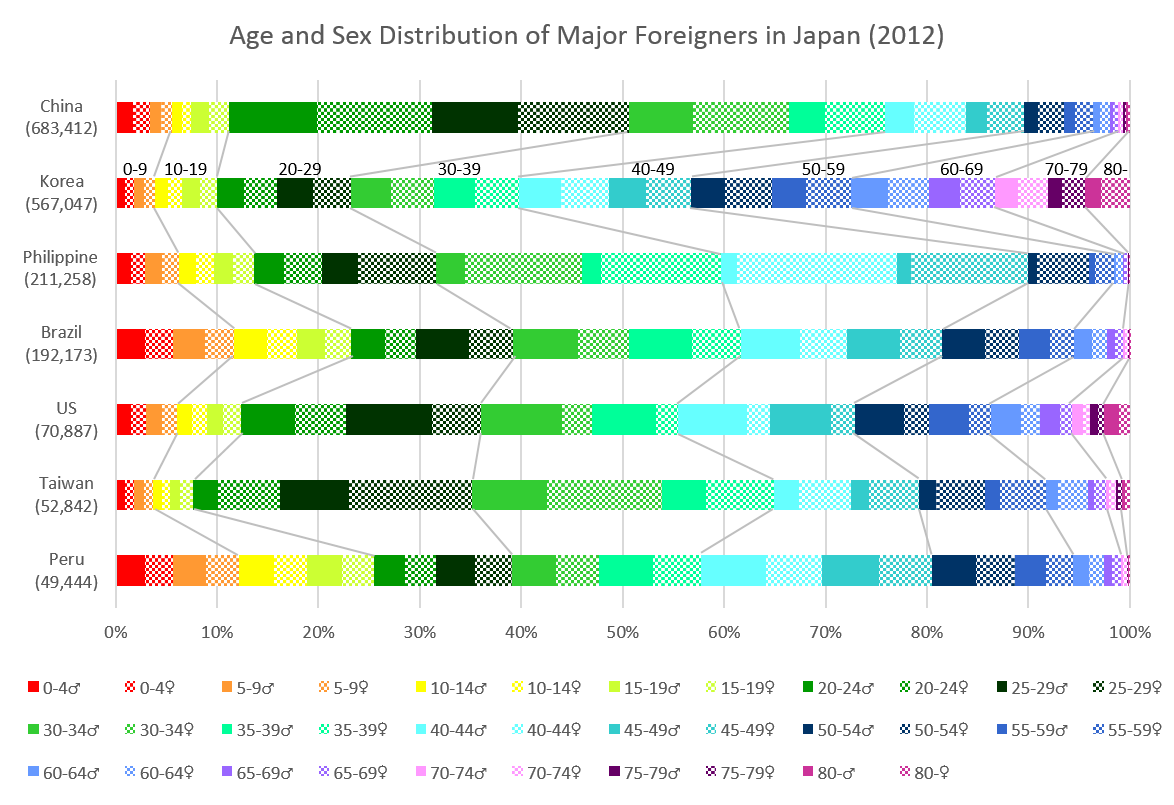
The age and sex distribution of major foreign cohorts in Japan, 2012

In December 2025, there were 4,125,395 foreign residents in Japan, representing 3.35% of the Japanese population. Foreign Army personnel, of which there were up to 430,000 from the SCAP (post-occupation, United States Forces Japan) and 40,000 BCOF in the immediate post-war years, have not been at any time included in Japanese foreign resident statistics. Most foreign residents in Japan come from other Asian countries, particularly from China, Vietnam, South Korea, the Philippines, Nepal, and Indonesia.

A number of long-term resident Koreans in Japan today retain familial links with the descendants of Koreans, that either immigrated voluntarily or were forcibly relocated during the Japanese occupation of Korea. Within this group, a number hold Special Permanent Resident status, granted under the terms of the June 1965 Normalisation Treaty between South Korea and Japan. In many cases special residents, despite being born in Japan and speaking Japanese, have chosen not to take advantage of the mostly automatic granting of citizenship to special resident applicants.

In 1947, the Japanese government started to repatriate Korean nationals, who had nominally been granted Japanese citizenship during the years of military occupation. When the Treaty of San Francisco came into force many ethnic Koreans lost their Japanese citizenship from April 1952, and with it the right to welfare grants, to hold a government job of any kind or to attend Japanese schools. In 1953, the government contrived, with the help of the Red Cross, a scheme to "repatriate" Korean residents, who mainly were from the Southern Provinces, to their "home" of North Korea. Between 1959 and 1984, 93,430 people used this route, of whom 6,737 were Japanese or Chinese dependents. Most of these departures – 78,276 – occurred before 1962.

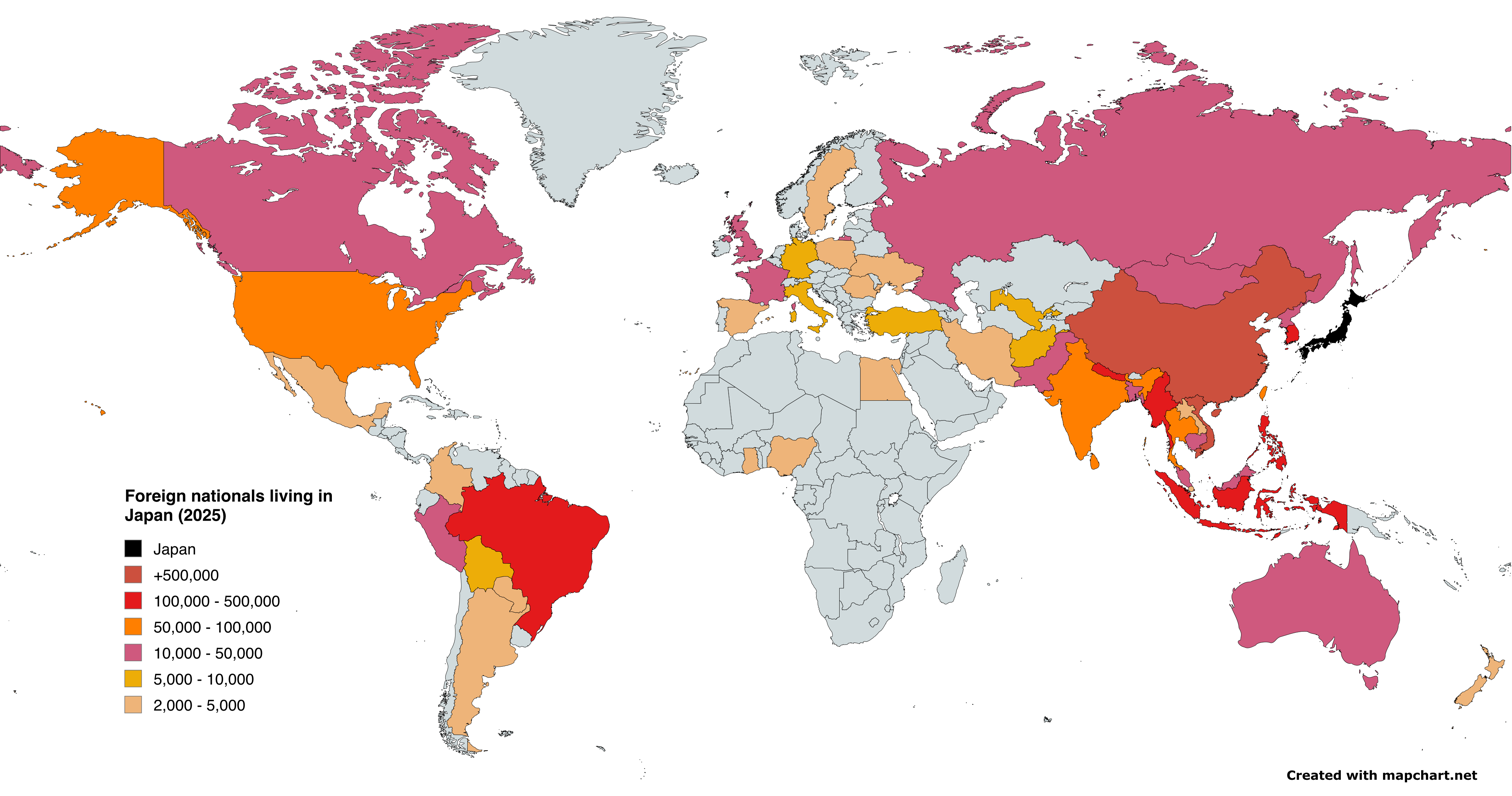
Foreign-born population by citizenship in 2025.

Japan's population in December 2025.
1. Japanese nationals (96.7%)
2. Foreign nationals (3.35%)

All non-Japanese without special residential status (people whose residential roots go back to before WWII) are required by law to register with the government and carry alien registration cards. From the early 1980s, a civil disobedience movement encouraged refusal of the fingerprinting that accompanied registration every five years.

Opponents of fingerprinting argued that it was discriminatory because the only Japanese who were fingerprinted were criminals. The courts upheld fingerprinting, but the law was changed so that fingerprinting was done once rather than with each renewal of the registration, which until a law reform in 1989 was usually required every six months for anybody from the age of 16. Those refusing fingerprinting were denied re-entry permits, thus depriving them of freedom of movement.

Of these foreign residents below, the new wave which started in 2014, came to Japan as students or trainees. These foreigners are registered under student visa or trainee visa, which gives them the student residency status. Most of these new foreigners are under this visa. Almost all of these foreign students and trainees will return to their home country after three to four years (one valid period); few students extend their visa. Vietnamese make up the largest increase. Burmese, Cambodians, Filipinos and Chinese are also increasing.

Asian migrant wives of Japanese men have also contributed to the foreign-born population in Japan. Many young single Japanese male farmers choose foreign wives, mainly from the Philippines, Sri Lanka, Thailand, China and South Korea, due to a lack of interest from Japanese women living a farming life. Migrant wives often travel as mail-order brides as a result of arranged marriages with Japanese men.

Country region groups	Number	Percentage of	
Country region groups	Number	Foreign citizens	Total population
Asians	3,601,581	87.3%	2.92%
South Americans	277,196	6.72%	0.23%
Europeans	108,466	2.63%	0.09%
North Americans	90,294	2.19%	0.07%
African	28,309	0.69%	0.02%
Oceania	19,099	0.46%	0.02%
Total (as of 2025)	4,125,395	100%	3.35%

=== Table: numbers of foreign nationals in Japan ===
Country	1990	2000	2005	2010	2015	2020	2025	Main article								
Country	1990	2000	2005	2010	2015	2020	2025	China	137,499	335,575	519,561	687,156	665,847	778,112	930,428	Chinese people in Japan
Vietnam	6,316	16,908	28,932	41,781	146,956	448,053	681,100	Vietnamese people in Japan								
South Korea	681,838	635,269	598,687	565,989	457,772	426,908	407,341	Koreans in Japan								
Philippines	38,925	144,871	187,261	210,181	229,595	279,660	356,579	Filipinos in Japan								
Nepal	399	3,649	6,953	17,525	54,775	95,982	300,992	Nepalis in Japan								
Indonesia	2,781	19,346	25,097	24,895	35,910	66,832	266,069	Indonesians in Japan								
Brazil	14,258	254,394	302,080	230,552	173,437	208,538	210,014	Brazilians in Japan								
Myanmar	894	4,851	5,342	8,577	13,737	35,049	182,567	Burmese people in Japan								
Sri Lanka	1,064	5,655	9,013	9,097	13,152	29,290	79,128	Sri Lankans in Japan								
Taiwan					48,723	55,872	73,256	Taiwanese in Japan								
United States	34,900	44,856	49,390	50,667	52,271	55,761	69,787	Americans in Japan								
Thailand	5,542	29,289	37,703	41,279	45,379	53,379	67,097	Thais in Japan								
India	2,926	10,064	16,988	22,497	26,244	38,558	58,999	Indians in Japan								
Peru	4,121	46,171	57,728	54,636	47,721	48,256	49,020	Peruvian migration to Japan								
Bangladesh	2,205	7,176	11,015	10,175	10,835	17,463	44,938	Bangladeshis in Japan								
Pakistan	1,875	7,498	8,789	10,299	12,708	19,103	34,911	Pakistanis in Japan								
Cambodia	1,148	1,761	2,263	2,683	6,111	16,659	28,957	Cambodians in Japan								
United Kingdom	9,272	16,525	17,494	16,044	15,826	16,891	22,428	Britons in Japan								
North Korea					33,939	27,214	22,201	Koreans in Japan								
Mongolia	23	1,209	3,762	4,949	6,590	13,504	21,359	Mongolians in Japan								
France	2,881	5,371	7,337	9,060	10,672	12,264	17,088	French people in Japan								
Australia	3,073	9,188	11,277	9,756	9,843	9,758	13,776	Australians in Japan								
Canada	4,172	10,088	12,022	9,995	9,538	10,103	13,034	Canadians in Japan								
Malaysia	4,309	8,386	7,910	8,364	8,738	10,318	12,266	Malaysians in Japan								
Russia	340	4,893	7,110	7,814	8,092	9,249	12,187	Russians in Japan								
Germany	3,410	4,295	5,356	5,971	6,336	6,114	9,417	Germans in Japan								
Turkey	190	1,424	2,275	2,547	4,157	6,212	7,919	Turks in Japan								
Uzbekistan	113	184	495	832	1,503	3,632	7,362	Uzbeks in Japan								
Bolivia	238	3,915	6,139	5,720	5,412	6,119	6,898	Bolivians in Japan								
Afghanistan	128	430	593	1,148	2,639	3,509	6,887	Afghans in Japan								
Italy	890	1,579	2,083	2,731	3,536	4,263	5,961	Italians in Japan								
Laos	864	1,677	2,393	2,639	2,592	2,903	4,993	Laotians in Japan								
Nigeria	140	1,741	2,389	2,729	2,638	3,315	4,807	Nigerians in Japan								
Iran	988	6,167	5,227	4,841	3,996	4,121	4,431	Iranians in Japan								
Ukraine	892	1,004	1,784	1,507	1,699	1,865	4,258	Ukrainians in Japan								
Spain	827	1,338	1,585	1,907	2,495	3,240	4,424	Spaniards in Japan								
New Zealand	967	3,264	3,824	3,250	3,152	3,280	4,212	New Zealanders in Japan								
Singapore	1,042	1,940	2,283	2,512	2,501	2,958	4,007	Singaporean in Japan								
Mexico	691	1,740	1,825	1,956	2,141	2,714	3,954	Mexicans in Japan								
Argentina	1,704	3,072	3,834	3,181	2,630	2,966	3,678	Argentines in Japan								
Ghana	518	1,657	1,824	1,883	2,235	2,005	3,541	Ghanaians in Japan								
Colombia	373	2,496	2,902	2,606	2,268	2,482	2,848	Colombians in Japan								
Egypt	344	1,103	1,366	1,593	2,005	2,027	2,601	Egyptians in Japan								
Romania	42	2,449	3,574	2,409	2,408	2,250	2,321	Romanians in Japan								
Paraguay	672	1,678	2,287	2,098	1,880	2,131	2,288	Paraguayans in Japan								
Sweden	586	1,158	1,136	1,553	1,805	1,514	2,135	Swedes in Japan								
Poland	359	742	870	978	1,653	1,408	2,080	Poles in Japan								
Netherlands	749	904	1,079	1,099	1,129	1,294	1,954	Dutch in Japan								
South Africa	108	353	564	570	691	1,020	1,826	South Africans in Japan								
Cameroon	6	100	214	343	473	1,059	1,882	Cameroonians in Japan								
Syria	70	135	158	188	477	970	1,701	Syrians in Japan								
Ireland	671	974	1,094	1,061	1,026	1,128	1,526	Irish people in Japan								
Switzerland	980	907	971	1,089	1,023	1,076	1,412	Swiss in Japan								
Chile	263	652	712	680	639	886	1,315	Chilean in Japan								
Total foreign residents	984,455	1,686,444	2,011,555	2,134,151	2,232,189	2,887,116	4,125,395									

==== Foreign residents in 2015 ====
There was an increase of 110,358 foreign residents from 2014 to 2015. Vietnamese made the largest proportion of these new foreign residents. Nepalese, Filipino, Chinese and Taiwanese are also significant in numbers. Together these countries made up 91,126 or 82.6% of all new residents from 2014 to 2015. The majority of these immigrants will only remain in Japan for a maximum of five years, as many of them have entered Japan in order to complete trainee programmes. Once they complete their programmes, they will be required to return to their home countries.

In December 2014, there were 2,121,831 foreigners residing in Japan, 677,019 of whom were long-term residents in Japan. The majority of long-term residents were from Asia, totalling 478,953. Chinese made up the largest portion of them with 215,155, followed by Filipinos with 115,857, and Koreans with 65,711. Thai, Vietnamese, and Taiwanese long-term residents totaled 47,956. Those from other Asian countries totaled 34,274. The Korean figures do not include zainichi Koreans with tokubetsu eijusha ("special permanent resident") visas, of whom there were 354,503, of a total of 358,409 of all nationalities with such visas. The number of permanent residents declined over the previous five years due to high cost of living.

==== Foreign residents in 2021 ====
In 2019, the number of foreign residents of Japan reached a high of 2.93 million before falling to 2.76 million at the end of 2021. The number of foreign workers was 1.46 million in 2018. 29.7% were in the manufacturing sector. 389,000 are from Vietnam and 316,000 are from China.

In April 2019, Japan's revised immigration law was enacted. The revision clarifies and better protects the rights of foreign workers. Japan formally accepts foreign blue-collar workers. This helps reduce labour shortage in certain sectors of the economy. The reform changes the status of foreign workers to regular employees and they can obtain permanent residence status.

The reform includes a new visa status called tokutei gino (特定技能, "designated skills"). In order to qualify, applicants must pass a language and skills test, level N4 or higher of the Japanese-Language Proficiency Test. In the old "Technical Trainee programme" a foreign employee was tied to their employer. This caused numerous cases of exploitation. The revision gives foreign workers more freedom to leave and change their employer.

Japanese nationality data mapped in prefectures in 2020

Japanese nationality (96.3% total)

Foreign nationality (1.9% total) (Note: The proportion of foreign nationals is most likely higher due to those that did not declare a nationality. The Statistics of Foreign Residents estimated that there was a total of 2,887,116 (2.3% of the total population) foreign nationals in December 2020, while in the 2020 census carried out in October enumerated 2,402,460 foreign nationals.)

No nationality stated (1.7% total)

== See also ==
- Demographic history of Japan before the Meiji Restoration
- Demography of the Empire of Japan
- Elderly people in Japan
- Largest cities in Japan by population by decade
- Demographics of Tokyo
