= Tokyo 7th district (1947–1993) =

Constituency of the House of Representatives in the Diet of Japan

Tokyo 7th district was a constituency of the House of Representatives in the Diet of Japan (national legislature). Between 1947 and 1993 it elected five, later four representatives by single non-transferable vote. It initially consisted of mainland Western Tokyo as a whole, namely the cities of Hachiōji and Tachikawa and the Nishitama, Minamitama and Kitatama districts of Tokyo.

For the election of 1976, Western parts were split off to form the new 11th district. As of 1993, the 7th district consisted of the cities of Tachikawa, Musashino, Mitaka, Akishima, Koganei, Kodaira, Higashimurayama, Kokubunji, Kunitachi, Tanashi, Hōya, Higashiyamato, Kiyose, Higashikurume and Musashimurayama. Following the redistricting, the ruling Liberal Democratic Party (LDP) never managed to have more than one of their candidates elected as center-left to left parties dominated the vote. In the 1986 election, the LDP stopped nominating two candidates and Kiyoshi Ozawa (later minister during the coalition with the Socialist Party) became the party's only candidate in Tokyo 7th district.

Since the electoral reform of 1994 the area is distributed over several single-member districts. The four last representatives for Tokyo 7 all ran again in the election of 1996, the first under the new system: Naoto Kan won the 18th district, Yuriko Ōno the 20th district; Kiyoshi Ozawa ran, but lost the 21st district to Democrat Jōji Yamamoto, and Kōichirō Watanabe failed to win the 19th district against Democratic newcomer Yoshinori Suematsu.

== Summary of results during the 1955 party system ==
General election		1958	1960	1963	1967	1969	1972	1976	1979	1980	1983	1986	1990	1993
LDP & conservative independents		2	3	2	2	2	2	1	1	1	1	1	1	1
Opposition	center-left	0	0	0	1	2	1	1	1	2	2	2	2	3
Opposition	JSP	3	2	3	2	0	1	1	1	1	0	0	1	0
Opposition	JCP	0	0	0	0	1	1	1	1	0	1	1	0	0
Seats up		5						4						

== Elected Representatives ==
election year	highest vote (top tōsen)	2nd	3rd	4th	5th
1947	Tenkōkō Sonoda (JSP)	Chōjirō Kurihara (JLP)	Yoshio Namiki (DP)	Hideo Yamahana (JSP)	Tatsuo Yatsunami (DP)
1949	Chōjirō Kurihara (DLP)	Kazuyoshi Dobashi (JCP)	Tokuyasu Fukuda (DLP)	Tenkōkō Sonoda (Workers and Farmers Party)	Yoshio Namiki (DP)
1952	Kōichi Nakamura (JSP, right)	Yoshio Namiki (Progressive Party)	Hideo Yamahana (JSP, left)	Tomejirō Ōkubo (LP)	Chōjirō Kuriyama (LP)
1953	Kōichi Nakamura (JSP, right)	Yoshio Namiki (Progressive Party)	Hideo Yamahana (JSP, left)	Tokuyasu Fukuda (Yoshida LP)	Kunitoshi Tsukumo (Yoshida LP)
1955	Yoshio Namiki (JDP)	Kōichi Nakamura (JSP, right)	Hideo Yamahana (JSP, left)	Shigeo Kizaki (JDP)	Tokuyasu Fukuda (LP)
1958	Tokuyasu Fukuda (LDP)	Kōichi Nakamura (JSP)	Shūichi Hōjō (JSP)	Hideo Yamahana (JSP)	Yoshiyasu Hosoda (LDP)
1960	Hideo Yamahana (JSP)	Kōichi Nakamura (JSP)	Tokuyasu Fukuda (LDP)	Kunitoshi Tsukumo (LDP)	Yoshiyasu Hosoda (LDP)
1963	Tokuyasu Fukuda (LDP)	Shōzō Hasegawa (JSP)	Kōichi Nakamura (JSP)	Shōji Koyama (LDP)	Hideo Yamahana (JSP)
1967	Tokuyasu Fukuda (LDP)	Kiyoshi Ōno (Kōmeitō)	Shōzō Hasegawa (JSP)	Shōji Koyama (LDP)	Hideo Yamahana (JSP)
1969	Tokuyasu Fukuda (LDP)	Kazuyoshi Dobashi (JCP)	Kiyoshi Ōno (Kōmeitō)	Shōji Koyama (LDP)	Haruo Wada (DSP)
1972	Kazuyoshi Dobashi (JCP)	Tokuyasu Fukuda (LDP)	Kiyoshi Ōno (Kōmeitō)	Shōzō Hasegawa (JSP)	Shōji Koyama (LDP)
1976	Tokuyasu Fukuda (LDP)	Shōzō Hasegawa (JSP)	Kiyoshi Ōno (Kōmeitō)	Akira Kudō (JCP)	–
1979	Kiyoshi Ōno (Kōmeitō)	Akira Kudō (JCP)	Shōzō Hasegawa (JSP)	Kiyoshi Ozawa (LDP)	–
1980	Naoto Kan (SDF)	Kiyoshi Ozawa (LDP)	Kiyoshi Ōno (Kōmeitō)	Shōzō Hasegawa (JSP)	–
1983	Naoto Kan (SDF)	Kiyoshi Ōno (Kōmeitō)	Akira Kudō (JCP)	Kiyoshi Ozawa (LDP)	–
1986	Kiyoshi Ozawa (LDP)	Naoto Kan (SDF)	Kiyoshi Ōno (Kōmeitō)	Akira Kudō (JCP)	–
1990	Kiyoshi Ozawa (LDP)	Hiroshi Tsunematsu (JSP)	Naoto Kan (SDF)	Yuriko Ōno (Kōmeitō)	–
1993	Naoto Kan (SDF)	Kōichirō Watanabe (JNP)	Kiyoshi Ozawa (LDP)	Yuriko Ōno (Kōmeitō)	–

== Last election result 1993 ==
1993
Party	Candidate	Votes	%	±%
SDF	Naoto Kan	154,827		
JNP	Kōichirō Watanabe	144,230		
LDP	Kiyoshi Ozawa	133,937		
Kōmeitō	Yuriko Ōno	109,725		
JSP	Hiroshi Tsunematsu	95,254		
JCP	Kenshō Sasaki	79,924		
Sagawa kyūmei! Gakusei, shimin giin no kai	Atsushi Yamamoto	24,294		
Independent	Kazuhiro Araki	6,586		
Independent	Shinkō Maehata	5,036		
Kokumintō	Reiko Yasuda	739		
Kokumintō	Ryō Hirata	520		
Zatsumintō	Teruhiko Sagara	468		
Turnout		763,567	60.15	
