= Tokyo Prefecture (1868–1943) =

Former prefecture of Japan

Coordinates: 35.68°N 139.77°E

Tokyo Prefecture 東京府
- Prefecture of Japan
- 1868–1943
- Flag Coat of arms

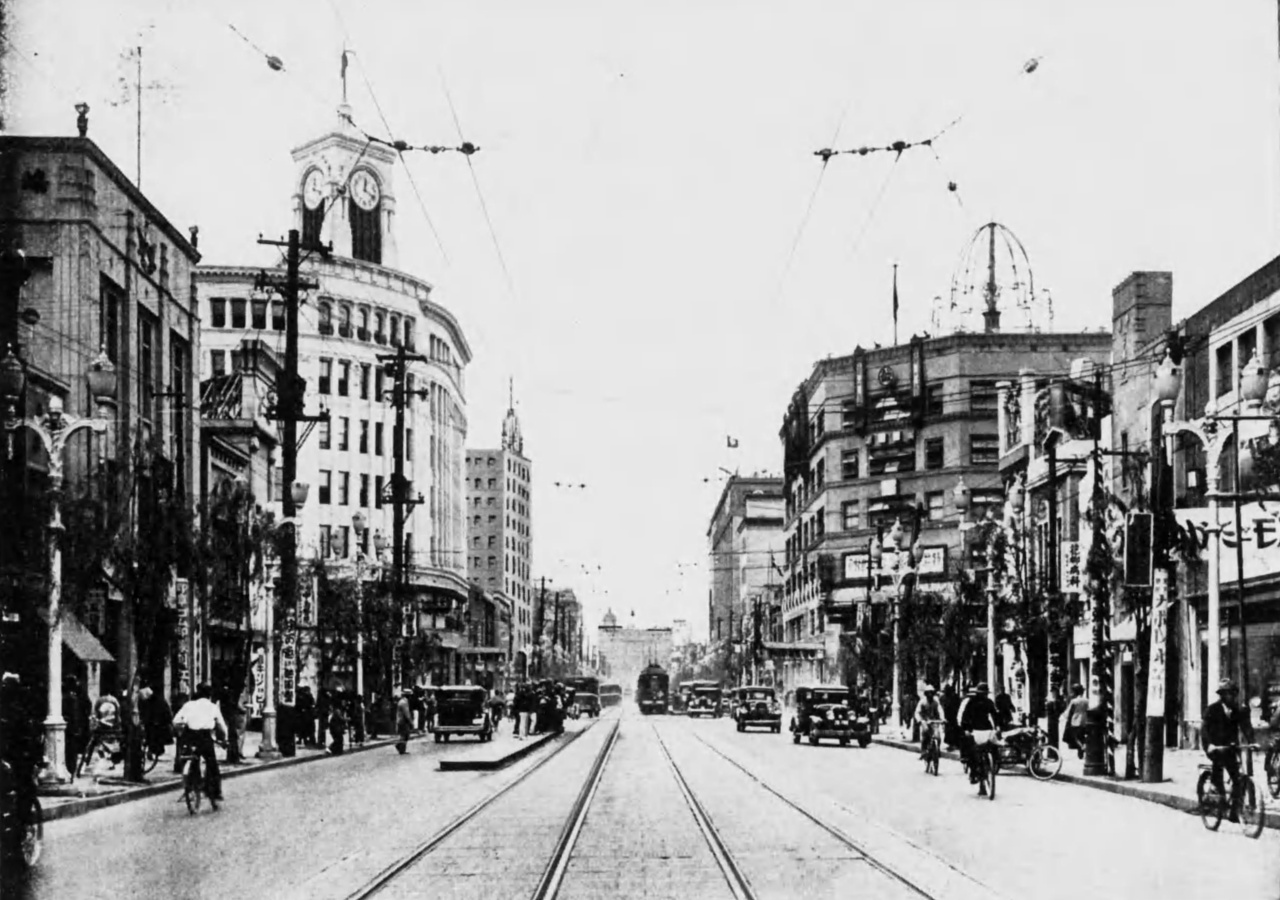
- Ginza, Tokyo City, in 1936
- Capital: Tokyo City
- History
  - Established: 2 October 1868
  - Disestablished: 1 July 1943
- Political subdivisions: 3 cities 3 Districts
Preceded by	Succeeded by
Musashi Province	Tokyo Metropolis
- Today part of: Part of the Tokyo Metropolis

Tokyo Prefecture (東京府, Tōkyō-fu) was a prefecture of Japan that existed between 1868 and 1943.

== History ==
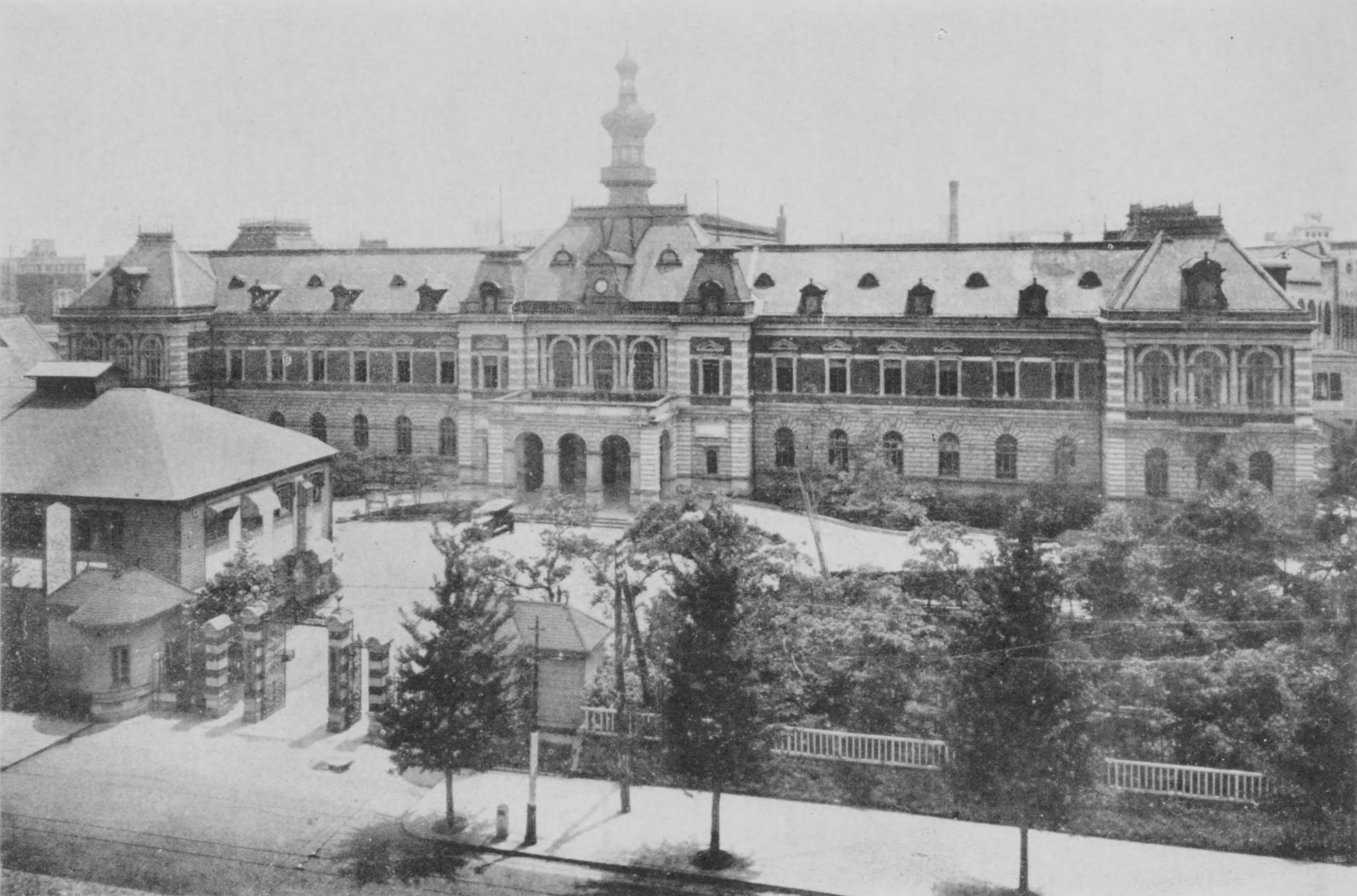
Tokyo Prefectural Office and Tokyo City Hall, 1930s

When the prefecture was established with the merger of the two shogunate city administrations in the Meiji restoration in 1868, Tokyo initially consisted only of the former city area of the shogunate capital Edo. Beginning in 1871, the territory of Tokyo was expanded beyond Edo in several steps to reach roughly its present extent with the Tama transfer in 1893. The surrounding former shogunate domain (incl. hatamoto fiefs) in Musashi province was initially administered by Musashi governors, but then split up between the prefectures Shinagawa, Kosuge and Ōmiya/Urawa. In 1871/72, the surrounding rural areas from these three prefectures and the Setagaya exclave of Hikone ex-domain/prefecture were merged into Tokyo.

The "system of large and small/major and minor districts" (大区小区制, daiku-shōku-sei) which was tied to the modernized family registration system (koseki) created an (unpopular) subdivision of all prefectures into numbered subunits.

Tokyo's administrative structure between 1871/72 and 1878 (not substantially different from other prefectures)
Level of government (executive, legislature)	Organization in Tokyo
Empire (appointed council, no assembly)	Home Ministry
Prefecture (appointed governor, no assembly)	Tōkyō-fu ("Tokyo Prefecture")
	[numbered] large/major districts (daiku) & small/minor districts (shōku)

In 1878, the ancient ritsuryō districts were reactivated as administrative units in rural areas, and the status of urban districts (-ku) was newly introduced for major cities. Under the gunkuchōson-hensei-hō (郡区町村編制法, "Law on the organization of -gun/-ku/-chō/-son"), both urban and rural districts were further subdivided into urban and rural units (-machi and -mura, i.e. towns and villages in the countryside, but neighbourhood-sized units in larger settlements; for example, there were 13 -machi/-chō and 93 -mura in Ebara District in the 1870s, including five (one "North", three "South", one "New") for Shinagawa alone; the >100 subdivisions of Ebara were merged into only 1 town and 18 villages in 1889, today there are only four special wards left in its former territory: Shinagawa, Meguro, Ōta, Setagaya). Initially, Tokyo contained only six [rural] districts, but other rural areas were added to Tokyo later (Izu & Ogasawara islands 1878/80, the three Tama districts 1893).

Tokyo's administrative structure between 1878 and 1889
Empire (appointed cabinet from 1885, no assembly)	Home Ministry	
Prefecture (appointed governor, elected assembly)	Tōkyō-fu ("Tokyo Prefecture")	
District (appointed chief, no (gun)/elected (ku) assembly)	15 [urban] districts (-ku)	6 [rural] districts (-gun)
Locality/[Proto-]Municipality (with restrictions: elected chief, elected assembly from 1880)	hundreds of urban and rural subdivisions/neighbourhoods, towns and villages (-machi/-chō and -mura)	

Tokyo on a map of 1872 prefectures, bordering Inba in the East, Saitama and Iruma in the North, and Kanagawa in the West and South

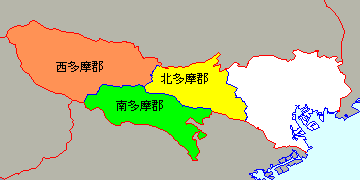
The "three Tama" (三多摩, san-Tama) districts transferred from Kanagawa to Tokyo in 1893: West Tama in orange, North Tama in yellow, South Tama in green.

When the modern municipalities were introduced in 1889, Tokyo was subdivided into c. 80 municipalities: 1 city, a handful of towns, and dozens of villages. With the Tama transfer of 1893, the number of municipalities in Tokyo grew to over 170. By 1943, there were only 87 municipalities left: 3 cities, 18 towns and 66 villages (see the List of mergers in Tokyo).

Tokyo's administrative structure between 1889 and 1943 (not different from Osaka, Kyoto)
Empire (appointed cabinet, Imperial Diet with two equal chambers: one appointed, one elected)	Home Ministry			
Prefecture (appointed governor & "council", elected assembly)	Tōkyō-fu ("Tokyo Prefecture")			
(District) (appointed chief & "council", indirectly elected assembly)	Tōkyō-shi ("Tokyo City") (until 1898 without independent administration: pref. governor=city mayor)	0→2 other cities (-shi); Hachiōji 1917, Tachikawa 1940	6→9→8→3 Districts (-gun) (until abolition in 1920s)	Subprefectures (for island municipalities)
Municipality (mayor appointed from assembly proposals + in cities: "council" from 1920s: indirectly elected mayor [& "council"], elected assembly)	Tōkyō-shi ("Tokyo City") (until 1898 without independent administration: pref. governor=city mayor)	0→2 other cities (-shi); Hachiōji 1917, Tachikawa 1940	>80→>170→84 towns (-machi) and villages (-mura)	
	15→35 Wards (-ku)	0→2 other cities (-shi); Hachiōji 1917, Tachikawa 1940	>80→>170→84 towns (-machi) and villages (-mura)	

Even after the Tama transfer, Tokyo City remained the dominant part of Tokyo in terms of population and economic strength. That increased further during the progressing industrialization and the explosive growth of the city in the early 20th century, only temporarily set back by the devastation brought about by the 1923 Great Kantō earthquake. The outskirts grew, but eventually Tokyo City's dominance within Tokyo only increased again as many of the explosively grown suburbs were merged into Tokyo City in 1932, including some of the largest towns in Japanese history with over 100,000 inhabitants each such as Nishisugamo in Kitatoshima District and Shibuya in Toyotama District.

Various plans for a unification of the prefectural and city government were discussed over the decades. An early proposal in the 1890s by then Home Minister Nomura Yasushi envisioned to separate the rural areas of Tokyo as Musashi prefecture and transform only Tokyo City into a "Metropolis", but it failed in the Imperial Diet. Some plans, especially those by the commoner political parties and during the "Taishō democracy" of the 1920s, envisioned a "Metropolis" more similar to a special city: an enlarged, prefecture-level city with more local autonomy. While the city did gain some additional authority under the 1922 "six major cities law" (more formally: 六大都市行政監督ニ関スル法律, roku-daitoshi gyōsei kantoku ni kan suru hōritsu, "Law relating to the administrative supervision of the six major cities"), and the governments made plans for a "Metropolis" system – the 1932 "Greater Tokyo City" mergers had been part of a Metropolis plan from the Tokyo City Assembly –, the actual reform was carried out later as part of the Tōjō cabinet's wartime authoritarian centralization measures (or "simplification of local government"). Not only was the Home Ministry control over prefectures and municipalities tightened as in the whole country – municipal mayors became appointive similar to the Meiji era –; Tokyo's prefectural government and Tokyo City's municipal government were indeed unified into one "Metropolitan" government, but under still tighter central government supervision.

Thus, in 1943, 86 of Tokyo's 87 municipalities remained Tokyo's municipalities, Tokyo City was abolished, all municipalities and the 35 ex-city wards were now part of Tokyo Metropolis (東京都, Tōkyō-to) which continues to serve as prefectural government for all of Tokyo, but now additionally as the municipal government in former Tokyo City. The governor of Tokyo, previously chiji as in all prefectures, was now called chōkan ("head/chief" [often of a central government agency]) and tied even more closely to the Imperial government than the governors of other prefectures. He became a shinninkan (親任官), meaning he was appointed directly by the Emperor, in the same procedure as a member of the Cabinet, the governors of Chōsen/Korea or Taiwan/Formosa, or an Army General or Navy Admiral.

Tokyo's wartime administrative structure from 1943 (unique)
Empire (appointed cabinet, bicameral appointed/elected Diet)	Emperor/Cabinet/Home Ministry		
Prefecture (appointed governor, elected assembly)	Tōkyō-to ("Tokyo Metropolis")		
Municipality (appointed mayor, elected assembly)		2 cities (-shi)	84 towns (-machi) and villages (-mura)
	35 wards (-ku)	2 cities (-shi)	84 towns (-machi) and villages (-mura)

The "Metropolis" is not to be confused with the Tokyo metropolitan area which extends into prefectures other than Tokyo and, depending on definition, may or may not include all of the "Metropolis".

In 1944/45, the establishment of regional bureaus created new parallel local administrative structures, lacking even the limited control by elected assemblies that prefectures and municipalities featured. And on the local level, the pre-existing neighbourhood associations (see chōnaikai and Tonarigumi) had been tied into the totalitarian Yokusankai vision and were endowed with far-reaching authority to establish an authoritarian system of control reaching down even to individual citizens. But the war tide had turned, and soon, the occupation under Douglas MacArthur overturned the wartime centralization, and beyond that, introduced new far-reaching local autonomy rights for prefectures, municipalities and even citizens in the form of "direct demands" (chokusetsu seikyū: recalls, popular initiative referendums for prefectural/municipal by-laws [excluding taxation], petitions, etc.).

The title chōkan for the governor actually remained in place until 1947 when the Constitution and the Local Autonomy Law made Tokyo equal with other prefectures again and gave the residents of former Tokyo City (almost) the same rights as in other municipalities with the introduction of special wards. The first gubernatorial election, held in April 1947 as part of the 1st unified elections, was still held as Tōkyō-to chōkan senkyo, and the first elected governor (who had also been the penultimate appointed governor from 1946 to 1947) initially still took office as chōkan, but became chiji in May 1947.
