= List of mergers in Tokyo =

This is a list of mergers in Tokyo, Japan, since the replacement of all feudal domains with prefectures in 1871. It also covers mergers into Tokyo.

== Prefectural border changes ==
This list may be incomplete, some smaller changes through cross-prefectural municipal mergers/transfers of neighbourhoods/border corrections may be missing. Changes in Tokyo's coastline are not included.

- 1871/72 – Abolition of feudal domains and first wave of prefectural mergers: Major parts of Shinagawa, Kosuge and Urawa Prefectures, covering the ancient Musashi Province Districts Ebara and Toshima and parts of Tama, Adachi and Katsushika become part of Tokyo.
- 1871/72 (eleventh month of Meiji 4/1871 (?)) – The Setagaya exclave (around present-day Setagaya in Setagaya Ward/"City") of Hikone Prefecture comprising 20 pre-modern Villages in the Ebara and Tama Districts is merged into Tokyo.
- 1878 – The Izu Islands (no district, Izu Province) are transferred from Shizuoka to Tokyo.
- 1880 – The Ogasawara Islands (no district, no province), previously under direct Home Ministry administration, are transferred to Tokyo.
- 1893 – The "three Tama" (san-Tama) [Districts], North Tama, South Tama and West Tama – the three western sections of ancient Tama district, Musashi province – comprising 91 Towns and Villages are transferred from Kanagawa to Tokyo.
- 1907 – Hōya village in North Adachi (before 1896: Niikura) district, Saitama is transferred to North Tama District, Tokyo.
- 1926 – The neighbourhood of Ukima from Yokozone Village [in North Adachi District], Saitama is transferred to Iwabuchi Town [in North Toshima District], Tokyo. (The remainder of Yokozone Village became part of Kawaguchi City in 1933.)
- 1958 – The majority of Moto-Sayama Village [in Iruma District], Saitama is merged into Mizuho Town [in West Tama], Tokyo. (The remainder of Moto-Sayama is simultaneously merged into Musashi Town [in Iruma district], Saitama.)

== District merger ==
- 1896 – The Districts East Tama (6 villages; district seat: Nakano village) and South Toshima (2 towns, 6 villages; district seat: Naitō-Shinjuku Town) are merged to form Toyotama District. The joint district government is set up in Yodobashi Town.

== Municipal mergers ==
This list is incomplete, most mergers are missing.

- 1917 – Hachiōji Town became an [independent] City, leaving Minamitama District.
- 1920 – Naitō-Shinjuku Town from Toyotama district is merged into Tokyo City where it becomes part of Yotsuya Ward.
- 1932 (establishment of Dai-Tōkyō-shi, "Greater Tokyo City") – 82 towns and villages were merged into Tokyo City and consolidated into 20 new wards.
- 1936 – The villages of Kinuta and Chitose were merged into Tokyo City and integrated into Setagaya Ward.
- 1941 – Komiya town was merged into Hachiōji city.
- In 1943 - Tokyo City (Tōkyō-shi) was abolished, and the government of the larger Tokyo Prefecture (Tōkyō-fu), henceforth the Tokyo Metropolis (Tōkyō-to), assumed the direct administration of the former city. Since 1943, no city in Japan has had the name Tokyo.
- March 1947 - The 35 wards of former Tokyo city were consolidated into 22 wards.
- May 1947 – The 22 wards were transformed into quasi-municipal special wards.
- August 1947 – The special ward of Nerima was split off from Itabashi.
- On 1955 – the villages of Hirai and Ōguno (both from Nishitama District) were merged to create the village of Hinode.
- On 1955 – the old city of Hachiōji absorbed the villages of Yokoyama, Moto-Hachiōji, Ongata, Kawaguchi, Kasumi and Yui (all from Minamitama District) to create new and expanded city of Hachiōji.
- On 1956 – the old village of Miyake absorbed the villages of Tsubota and Ako (all from Miyake Subprefecture) to create new and expanded village of Miyake.
- On 1958 – the former Machida town and the villages of Tadao, Tsurukawa and Sakai (all from Minamitama District) were merged to create and new establish the city of Machida.
- On 1959 – the village of Asakawa (from Minamitama District) were merged into expanded city of Hachiōji.
- On 1963 – the old city of Tachikawa absorbed the town of Sunagawa (from Kitatama District) to create new and expanded city of Tachikawa.
- On 1964 - the village of Yugi (from Minamitama District) were merged into expanded city Hachiōji.
- On 1995 - the city of Akigawa merged with the town of Itsukaichi (from Nishitama District) were merged to create the city of Akiruno.
- On January 21, 2001 - the cities of Hōya and Tanashi were merged to create the city of Nishitōkyō.

== Name changes ==
- 1928 – Chōfu village (Chōfu-mura) in Ebara county becomes a town and is renamed East Chōfu town (Higashi-Chōfu-machi; note: there had been a Chōfu-machi/Chōfu town in North Tama county, Kanagawa since 1889. There had also been Chōfu-mura/Chōfu village in West Tama county (Nishitama-gun), Kanagawa since 1889. North (Kita-), South (Minami-) and West Tama counties (Nishi-Tama-gun) were transferred from Kanagawa to Tokyo in 1893, so that there were three different municipalities named "Chōfu" (two -mura, one -machi) in Tokyo until 1928. Eventually, East Chōfu town, Ebara became part of Tokyo City in 1932, Chōfu village, West Tama became part of Ōme city in 1951 and Chōfu town, North Tama became part of Chōfu city in 1955)
- 1970 – Murayama town (Murayama-machi) becomes a city and is renamed Musashi-Murayama city (Musashi-Murayama-shi; note: there was already a Murayama-shi/Murayama city in Yamagata/Dewa since 1954.)
- 1970 – Yamato town (Yamato-machi) becomes a city and is renamed Higashi-Yamato-shi ("East Yamato city"; note: there was already a Yamato-shi/Yamato city in Kanagawa since 1959. Geographically, Higashi-Yamato-shi lies almost exactly north of Yamato-shi; the Higashi/"East" (東) represents the Tō (東) in Tōkyō – Higashi-Yamato-shi is "Tokyo's Yamato City". There had also been a Yamato town in Saitama which was renamed as Wakō city in 1970.)
- 1970 – Kurume town (Kurume-machi) becomes a city and is renamed East Kurume city (Higashi-Kurume-shi; note: there was already a Kurume-shi/Kurume city in Fukuoka, one of the first 40 cities of Japan in 1889/90.)

== Notes ==
- There are several technical differences between two types of mergers: hennyū gappei, "incorporating/absorbing mergers", where one or several municipalities merge into another that continues to exist, and shinsetsu gappei, "new establishment mergers", where two or more municipalities dissolve to establish a new one which may bear the identical name of one of its predecessors. In the latter case – regardless of naming –, for example, municipal institutions (mayor and assembly) lose their mandates, and new elections must be held.
- County/district governments were dissolved in the 1920s following a 1921 initiative by the Hara Cabinet and are not mentioned in the list after their abolition as administrative units.
