= Demographics of Tokyo =

- Population pyramid of Tokyo (2020)
- Population: ▲14,270,748 (2026)
- Fertility rate: ▼0.96 (2024)

The demography of Tokyo is analysed by the Tokyo Metropolitan Government and data is produced for each of the Special wards of Tokyo, the Western Tokyo and the Tokyo Islands, and for all of Tokyo prefecture as a whole. Statistical information is produced about the size and geographical breakdown of the population, the number of people entering and leaving country and the number of people in each demographic subgroup.

As of 2025, the total population of Tokyo is 14,195,730 and had the largest population (11.5 percent of the total population).

== History ==
Population of South-Kanto Prefectures (Greater Tokyo area)

Historical population
Year	Pop.	±%
1872	859,345	—
1875	986,091	+14.7%
1885	1,163,400	+18.0%
1895	1,638,700	+40.9%
1900	1,947,300	+18.8%
1910	2,706,800	+39.0%
1920	3,699,428	+36.7%
1930	5,408,678	+46.2%
1940	7,354,971	+36.0%
1945	3,488,284	−52.6%
1950	6,277,500	+80.0%
1955	8,037,084	+28.0%
1960	9,683,802	+20.5%
1965	10,869,244	+12.2%
1970	11,408,071	+5.0%
1975	11,673,554	+2.3%
1980	11,618,281	−0.5%
1985	11,829,363	+1.8%
1990	11,855,563	+0.2%
1995	11,773,605	−0.7%
2000	12,064,101	+2.5%
2005	12,576,601	+4.2%
2010	13,159,388	+4.6%
2015	13,515,271	+2.7%
2020	13,982,112	+3.5%
2025	14,273,066	+2.1%
Source: Tokyo Metropolitan Government

Before Tokyo existed as a major population center, the area was known as Edo, a modest fishing village. Population estimates suggest only a few thousand inhabitants, largely engaged in fishing, agriculture, and local trade.

In 1603, Tokugawa Ieyasu established the Tokugawa shogunate, making Edo the de facto political capital of Japan. Rapid urbanization followed as samurai, artisans, merchants, and laborers migrated to serve the shogunate. By 1721, Edo's population surpassed 1 million, making it one of the largest cities in the world at the time, along with Beijing. This growth was driven by the sankin-kōtai policy, which required feudal lords (daimyō) and their vast retinues to reside in Edo in alternate years.

Emperor Meiji was brought from Kyoto to lead the Meiji Restoration, which formed a new imperial government. The first census recorded a population of 859,345 in 1872, which was roughly one-fifth the size of London, the most populous city in the world at the time. In 1905, the population reached two million. Tokyo's population continued to grow from 3.7 million in 1920, when the first census was taken, to 4,48 million in 1925. In 1923, the Great Kanto earthquake caused 75% of all buildings suffered severe structural damage. Although 2% to 3% of the population (over 100,000 people) were killed the population still grew. The Population reached 7.35 million in 1940 and recovery was rapid, but the Bombing of Tokyo during World War II (1944–1945) caused mass casualties and evacuations, dramatically reducing the city's population by war's end falling to 3.49 million in 1945.

=== Post-war expansion ===
In the postwar era and an increase in the number of births due to the first baby boom and Post–World War II economic expansion, the population rapidly increased from 3.49 million to 6.28 million between 1945 and 1950. In 1954, Tokyo became the world's most populous city, overtaking New York City, and continued to grow thereafter. Although the rate of increase slowed, the population reached 11.67 million in 1975. Sustained migration from rural Japan throughout the 1960s and 70s created a massive urban sprawl. By the 1980s, "Greater Tokyo" (including neighboring prefectures like Saitama and Kanagawa) solidified its rank as the world's most populous metropolitan area. The population remained almost flat from 1975 to 1995, but then began to increase, reaching 13.16 million in 2010.

Internal migration to Tokyo has steadily increased since 2022 following a brief slowdown during the COVID-19 pandemic. The trend resumed after the pandemic and fully rebounded by 2023–2024. Despite the influx of youth, Tokyo faces an aging population; as of 2024, approximately 23% of residents are over age 65. International residents now exceed 647,000, with the largest groups originating from China, South Korea, and Vietnam.

== Vital statistics ==
Population of Tokyo, 1872-2016

The number of births in Tokyo peaked in the post-war period at 240,000 in 1967, remaining at around 230,000 until 1973, after which it began to decline, remaining at around 100,000 since 1989. Meanwhile, the number of deaths has been on a gradual increase since 1956, reaching a post-war high of 110,000 in 2013. Looking at the trends in natural increase/decrease (births - deaths), with the exception of 1945, the number of births has consistently exceeded the number of deaths since 1920, but the natural increase has shrunk since peaking in 1967, and in 2012 the number of deaths exceeded the number of births for the first time since the war.

=== Vital statistics since 1900 ===
Source: Tokyo Metropolitan Government

Notable events in demography of Tokyo:

- 1923 – Kanto earthquake
- 1940–45 – Second World War

	Total population (1 Oct)	Live births	Deaths	Natural change	Crude birth rate (per 1000)	Crude death rate (per 1000)	Natural change (per 1000)	Crude migration rate (per 1000)	Total Fertility Rate
1900	1,947,300	55,461	40,986	14,475	28.5	21.1	7.4		
1901	2,019,100	60,327	41,775	18,552	29.9	20.7	9.2	27.3	
1902	2,093,801	59,017	44,071	14,946	28.2	21.1	7.1	28.5	
1903	2,171,100	60,115	44,162	15,953	27.7	20.3	7.4	29.4	
1904	2,251,300	61,046	48,360	12,686	27.1	21.5	5.6	31.0	
1905	2,334,600	65,561	47,970	17,591	28.1	20.6	7.5	29.2	
1906	2,420,900	56,750	46,908	9,842	23.4	19.4	4.1	32.6	
1907	2,510,500	77,010	51,839	25,171	30.7	20.7	10.0	26.7	
1908	2,603,300	74,769	53,830	20,939	28.7	20.7	8.0	25.8	
1909	2,682,000	77,557	57,515	20,042	28.9	21.4	7.5	22.0	
1910	2,706,800	81,357	56,310	25,047	30.1	20.8	9.3	−0.1	
1911	2,732,000	82,629	57,041	25,588	30.2	20.9	9.4	−0.1	
1912	2,757,500	85,727	56,056	29,671	31.1	20.3	10.8	−1.5	
1913	2,783,400	88,110	58,476	29,634	31.7	21.0	10.6	−1.4	
1914	2,809,600	92,853	59,284	33,569	33.1	21.1	12.0	−2.1	
1915	2,836,200	93,701	64,946	28,755	33.0	22.9	10.1	−0.8	
1916	2,863,100	91,243	66,942	24,301	31.9	23.4	8.5	0.8	
1917	2,890,400	97,246	71,248	25,998	33.6	24.7	9.0	0.5	
1918	2,918,000	95,188	80,064	15,124	32.6	27.4	5.2	4.3	
1919	3,340,100	105,564	83,753	21,811	31.6	25.1	6.5	137.6	
1920	3,699,428	110,131	88,572	21,559	29.8	23.9	5.8	101.9	
1921	3,830,700	120,742	81,201	39,541	31.5	21.2	10.3	24.8	
1922	3,984,200	120,670	81,105	39,565	30.3	20.4	9.9	28.9	
1923	3,859,400	117,705	110,085	7,620	30.5	28.5	2.0	−34.2	
1924	4,185,500	123,526	75,136	48,390	29.5	18.0	11.6	65.5	
1925	4,485,144	144,230	79,129	65,101	32.1	17.6	14.5	56.7	
1926	4,694,400	137,856	72,933	64,923	29.4	15.5	13.8	32.3	
1927	4,987,400	145,653	79,425	66,228	29.2	15.9	13.3	48.4	
1928	5,101,400	152,251	84,759	67,492	29.8	16.6	13.2	9.0	
1929	5,300,000	147,889	86,997	60,892	27.9	16.4	11.5	26.0	
1930	5,408,678	151,493	76,697	74,796	28.0	14.2	13.8	6.3	
1931	5,521,100	158,235	85,916	72,319	28.7	15.6	13.1	7.4	
1932	5,755,600	161,178	78,575	82,603	28.0	13.7	14.4	27.7	
1933	5,975,100	164,067	86,141	77,926	27.5	14.4	13.0	23.8	
1934	6,176,900	154,044	84,108	69,936	24.9	13.6	11.3	21.9	
1935	6,369,919	175,890	82,143	93,747	27.6	12.9	14.7	16.6	
1936	6,586,500	170,620	85,312	85,308	25.9	13.0	13.0	20.6	
1937	6,725,700	172,171	87,380	84,791	25.6	13.0	12.6	8.2	
1938	6,875,600	157,466	94,202	63,264	22.9	13.7	9.2	12.6	
1939	7,081,600	165,548	95,813	69,735	23.4	13.5	9.8	19.4	
1940	7,354,971	192,555	89,584	102,971	26.2	12.2	14.0	23.9	
1941	7,284,300	223,337	89,122	134,215	30.7	12.2	18.4	−18.6	
1942	7,357,800	223,583	91,862	131,721	30.4	12.5	17.9	−7.9	
1943	7,332,600	238,061	95,069	142,992	32.5	13.0	19.5	−16.4	
1944	7,271,001	170,711	85,409	85,302	23.5	11.8	11.7	−20.1	
1945	3,488,284	75,475	132,398	-56,923	21.6	38.0	–16.3	−518.6	
1946	4,183,072	97,517	68,436	29,081	23.3	16.4	7.0	158.1	
1947	5,000,777	157,306	58,723	98,583	31.5	11.7	19.7	97.0	
1948	5,417,871	161,476	51,624	109,852	29.8	9.5	20.3	56.6	
1949	5,950,775	167,697	53,322	114,375	28.2	9.0	19.2	70.7	
1950	6,277,500	148,423	51,790	96,633	23.6	8.3	15.4	38.5	
1951	6,748,950	137,295	47,600	89,695	20.4	7.1	13.3	56.6	
1952	7,091,508	133,336	45,646	87,690	18.8	6.4	12.4	35.7	
1953	7,448,562	125,859	42,275	83,584	16.9	5.7	11.2	38.9	
1954	7,752,730	126,303	45,697	80,606	16.3	5.9	10.4	28.8	
1955	8,037,084	127,847	44,718	83,129	15.9	5.6	10.3	25.6	
1956	8,342,674	127,153	47,583	79,570	15.2	5.7	9.5	27.1	
1957	8,664,412	131,115	50,599	80,516	15.1	5.8	9.3	27.9	
1958	9,006,061	146,080	47,831	98,249	16.2	5.3	10.9	27.0	
1959	9,356,024	152,933	48,262	104,671	16.4	5.2	11.2	26.2	
1960	9,683,802	164,826	50,048	114,778	17.0	5.2	11.9	22.3	1.70
1961	9,935,667	172,128	50,232	121,896	17.3	5.1	12.3	13.4	
1962	10,177,298	183,009	52,397	130,612	18.0	5.1	12.8	10.9	
1963	10,428,262	193,553	48,773	144,780	18.6	4.7	13.9	10.2	
1964	10,634,364	207,567	50,506	157,061	19.5	4.8	14.8	4.6	
1965	10,869,244	225,492	51,644	173,848	20.8	4.8	16.0	5.6	2.00
1966	11,004,515	177,354	50,797	126,557	16.1	4.6	11.5	0.8	
1967	11,171,836	235,583	52,245	183,338	21.1	4.7	16.4	−1.4	
1968	11,349,708	229,042	52,913	176,129	20.2	4.7	15.5	0.2	
1969	11,453,600	229,174	55,675	173,499	20.0	4.9	15.2	−6.1	
1970	11,408,071	229,687	56,183	173,504	20.1	4.9	15.2	−19.2	1.96
1971	11,513,020	232,695	54,518	178,177	20.2	4.7	15.5	−6.4	2.02
1972	11,581,906	230,584	54,111	176,473	19.9	4.7	15.2	−9.3	1.97
1973	11,612,311	226,372	55,393	170,979	19.5	4.8	14.7	−12.1	1.93
1974	11,622,651	209,244	54,784	154,460	18.0	4.7	13.3	−12.4	1.77
1975	11,673,554	186,701	55,323	131,378	16.0	4.7	11.3	−6.9	1.63
1976	11,683,613	173,538	54,646	118,892	14.9	4.7	10.2	−9.3	1.51
1977	11,695,150	164,459	54,677	109,782	14.1	4.7	9.4	−8.4	1.50
1978	11,696,373	157,066	56,343	100,723	13.4	4.8	8.6	−8.5	1.51
1979	11,687,222	148,543	55,758	92,785	12.7	4.8	7.9	−8.6	1.50
1980	11,618,281	139,953	58,258	81,695	12.1	5.0	7.0	−13.0	1.44
1981	11,634,428	136,753	58,747	78,006	11.8	5.1	6.7	−5.3	1.41
1982	11,676,264	133,777	58,351	75,426	11.5	5.0	6.5	−2.9	1.43
1983	11,746,190	132,052	60,768	71,284	11.2	5.2	6.1	−0.1	1.43
1984	11,822,369	131,151	61,399	69,752	11.1	5.2	5.9	0.5	1.43
1985	11,829,363	126,178	62,499	63,679	10.7	5.3	5.4	−5.3	1.44
1986	11,906,489	121,745	62,935	58,810	10.2	5.3	4.9	1.5	1.37
1987	11,929,951	118,509	63,879	54,630	9.9	5.4	4.6	−2.6	1.35
1988	11,935,700	114,422	67,078	47,344	9.6	5.6	4.0	−4.0	1.31
1989	11,927,457	106,480	67,629	38,851	8.9	5.7	3.3	−4.0	1.24
1990	11,855,563	103,983	70,370	33,613	8.8	5.9	2.8	−9.0	1.23
1991	11,884,715	103,226	70,675	32,551	8.7	6.0	2.7	−0.3	1.18
1992	11,890,411	100,965	72,974	27,991	8.5	6.1	2.4	−3.8	1.14
1993	11,861,778	98,291	74,758	23,533	8.3	6.3	2.0	−6.2	1.10
1994	11,815,831	101,998	75,299	26,699	8.6	6.4	2.3	−6.0	1.14
1995	11,773,605	96,823	78,651	18,172	8.2	6.7	1.5	−5.1	1.11
1996	11,789,799	97,954	77,356	20,598	8.3	6.6	1.8	−1.9	1.07
1997	11,838,466	97,906	78,744	19,162	8.3	6.7	1.6	2.5	1.05
1998	11,904,007	98,960	80,793	18,167	8.3	6.8	1.5	4.0	1.05
1999	11,973,385	97,959	85,427	12,532	8.2	7.1	1.1	4.8	1.03
2000	12,064,101	100,209	83,849	16,360	8.3	7.0	1.4	6.2	1.07
2001	12,178,176	98,421	84,586	13,835	8.1	7.0	1.1	8.2	1.00
2002	12,292,467	100,118	85,162	14,956	8.1	6.9	1.2	8.1	1.02
2003	12,388,222	98,534	87,500	11,034	8.0	7.1	0.9	6.9	1.00
2004	12,477,934	99,272	88,767	10,505	8.0	7.1	0.8	6.3	1.01
2005	12,576,601	96,542	93,599	2,943	7.7	7.4	0.2	5.7	1.00
2006	12,700,327	101,674	93,596	8,078	8.0	7.4	0.6	9.1	1.02
2007	12,835,130	103,837	96,354	7,483	8.1	7.5	0.6	10.0	1.05
2008	12,965,871	106,015	98,248	7,767	8.2	7.6	0.6	9.5	1.09
2009	13,077,625	106,613	98,304	8,309	8.2	7.5	0.6	7.9	1.12
2010	13,159,388	108,135	104,238	3,897	8.2	7.9	0.3	2.4	1.12
2011	13,191,203	106,027	105,723	304	8.0	8.0	0.0	2.4	1.06
2012	13,225,551	107,401	109,194	-1,793	8.1	8.3	–0.1	2.7	1.09
2013	13,301,154	109,986	110,507	-521	8.3	8.3	–0.0	6.1	1.13
2014	13,398,087	110,629	111,024	-395	8.3	8.3	–0.0	7.3	1.15
2015	13,515,271	113,194	111,673	1,521	8.4	8.3	0.1	7.6	1.24
2016	13,651,276	111,964	113,415	-1,451	8.2	8.3	–0.1	10.1	1.24
2017	13,773,187	108,990	116,453	-7,463	7.9	8.5	–0.5	9.4	1.21
2018	13,888,986	107,150	119,253	-12,103	7.7	8.6	–0.9	9.2	1.20
2019	14,004,097	101,818	120,870	-19,052	7.3	8.6	–1.4	9.6	1.15
2020	14,047,594	99,661	121,219	-21,558	7.1	8.6	–1.5	4.6	1.12
2021	14,011,487	95,404	127,649	-32,245	6.8	9.1	–2.3	2.8	1.08
2022	14,040,732	91,097	139,264	-48,167	6.5	9.9	–3.4	5.5	1.04
2023	14,099,993	86,348	137,241	-50,893	6.1	9.7	–3.6	7.8	0.99
2024	14,192,184	84,207	140,329	-56,122	5.9	9.9	-4.0	10.5	0.96
2025	14,273,066	85,064	138,377	-53 313	6.3	10.3	-4.0	9.4	0.96

=== Total fertility rate by district ===
Influx of single women has been driving Tokyo birth rate to lowest in Japan, since the high cost of living is a deterrent to marriage and childbearing. TFR calculation is strongly linked to marriage in Japan, where very few children are born outside of wedlock. Even when women do marry, the average age of first childbirth is the highest in Tokyo, shortening the total reproductive window. The total fertility rate for 2023 was 0.99 in Tokyo, the only prefecture in Japan that did not reach 1.00.

	1993	1994	1995	1996	1997	1998	1999	2000	2001	2002	2003	2004	2005	2006	2007	2008	2009	2010	2011	2012	2013	2014	2015	2016	2017	2018	2019	2020
Tokyo	1.1	1.14	1.11	1.07	1.05	1.05	1.03	1.07	1	1.02	1	1.01	1	1.02	1.05	1.09	1.12	1.12	1.06	1.09	1.13	1.15	1.24	1.24	1.21	1.2	1.15	1.12
Special Wards	1.06	1.09	1.02	1.03	1.01	1	0.98	1	0.97	0.98	0.96	0.96	0.95	0.98	1.01	1.04	1.06	1.08	1.08	1.12	1.16	1.19	1.22	1.22	1.2	1.19	1.13	1.12
Chiyoda	0.8	0.84	0.8	0.87	0.8	0.75	0.77	0.82	0.81	0.77	0.88	0.82	0.75	0.82	0.93	0.94	1	0.96	0.94	1.15	1.09	1.34	1.3	1.35	1.41	1.2	1.26	1.32
Chuo	0.98	1.06	0.99	0.91	0.95	0.94	0.87	0.89	0.91	0.85	0.93	0.85	0.86	0.97	1.02	1.04	1.1	1.18	1.13	1.18	1.29	1.35	1.43	1.44	1.42	1.42	1.38	1.43
Minato	0.9	0.98	0.89	0.88	0.87	0.9	0.87	0.85	0.84	0.89	0.87	0.78	0.79	0.97	0.99	1.13	1.15	1.2	1.17	1.27	1.27	1.39	1.44	1.45	1.42	1.39	1.35	1.34
Shinjuku	0.91	0.92	0.9	0.88	0.85	0.86	0.83	0.83	0.86	0.8	0.79	0.82	0.79	0.83	0.84	0.85	0.93	0.92	0.89	0.96	0.96	0.97	1.02	1.07	1.08	1.03	0.97	1
Bunkyo	0.86	0.96	0.85	0.85	0.84	0.81	0.86	0.85	0.81	0.81	0.77	0.81	0.79	0.85	0.89	0.94	0.91	0.97	1.02	1.01	1.09	1.13	1.17	1.25	1.2	1.24	1.17	1.23
Taito	1.04	1.1	0.97	1	0.94	0.95	0.95	0.94	0.93	0.91	0.96	0.95	0.92	1.03	1.04	1.02	1	1.11	1.09	1.12	1.15	1.22	1.23	1.2	1.25	1.23	1.17	1.14
Sumida	1.11	1.13	1.11	1.13	1.07	1.11	1.08	1.05	1.1	1.07	1.08	1.06	1.07	1.07	1.11	1.1	1.15	1.15	1.1	1.18	1.17	1.22	1.3	1.25	1.28	1.24	1.17	1.12
Koto	1.1	1.15	1.09	1.05	1.05	1.1	1.1	1.05	1.08	1.14	1.06	1.12	1.1	1.16	1.2	1.18	1.23	1.26	1.24	1.26	1.33	1.33	1.42	1.39	1.35	1.32	1.22	1.22
Shinagawa	0.94	0.98	0.9	0.95	0.89	0.91	0.88	0.91	0.88	0.86	0.85	0.88	0.88	0.94	0.93	0.97	1.02	1	1.05	1.11	1.16	1.14	1.23	1.25	1.23	1.21	1.19	1.21
Meguro	0.79	0.81	0.78	0.76	0.76	0.79	0.73	0.73	0.73	0.68	0.74	0.72	0.71	0.74	0.75	0.8	0.83	0.89	0.88	0.92	0.94	1.05	1.04	1.04	1.07	1.06	1.05	1.02
Ota	1.16	1.18	1.09	1.1	1.09	1.07	1.05	1.09	1.01	1.04	1.03	1.03	1	1.04	1.07	1.08	1.12	1.1	1.12	1.13	1.17	1.19	1.21	1.18	1.17	1.19	1.1	1.13
Setagaya	0.88	0.91	0.84	0.84	0.82	0.81	0.81	0.82	0.79	0.79	0.78	0.78	0.79	0.81	0.87	0.9	0.9	0.95	0.96	1	1.05	1.1	1.12	1.12	1.07	1.08	1.02	1
Shibuya	0.8	0.82	0.71	0.79	0.77	0.77	0.73	0.71	0.72	0.74	0.7	0.71	0.7	0.73	0.78	0.77	0.85	0.85	0.86	0.93	0.97	1.02	1.08	1.08	1.09	1.08	1.04	1.04
Nakano	0.87	0.91	0.82	0.8	0.8	0.82	0.79	0.77	0.77	0.77	0.78	0.75	0.75	0.77	0.78	0.83	0.88	0.89	0.86	0.9	0.93	0.99	1.03	1.06	1.04	1	0.93	0.97
Suginami	0.85	0.88	0.82	0.79	0.8	0.78	0.74	0.78	0.73	0.76	0.74	0.75	0.71	0.76	0.78	0.81	0.82	0.86	0.87	0.89	0.95	0.99	1.04	1.03	1	1.03	0.99	1
Toshima	0.9	0.91	0.84	0.82	0.87	0.82	0.83	0.82	0.77	0.79	0.76	0.76	0.76	0.79	0.82	0.82	0.88	0.88	0.91	0.93	0.99	1	1	1.02	1.04	0.99	0.95	0.91
Kita	1.09	1.07	0.98	1.02	1.02	1	0.98	1	0.96	0.97	0.95	0.97	0.97	0.99	0.99	1.03	1.06	1.07	1.05	1.09	1.18	1.2	1.22	1.26	1.21	1.18	1.18	1.18
Arakawa	1.16	1.26	1.12	1.18	1.16	1.1	1.06	1.12	1.09	1.15	1.09	1.08	1.06	1.08	1.1	1.17	1.16	1.23	1.25	1.2	1.3	1.34	1.33	1.33	1.33	1.19	1.24	1.22
Itabashi	1.16	1.21	1.12	1.15	1.09	1.07	1.07	1.07	1.03	1.07	1.01	1.04	1.01	1.06	1.04	1.14	1.1	1.12	1.13	1.13	1.17	1.16	1.19	1.21	1.18	1.16	1.08	1.03
Nerima	1.17	1.2	1.13	1.13	1.12	1.11	1.09	1.12	1.07	1.09	1.06	1.06	1.02	1.05	1.1	1.11	1.11	1.15	1.14	1.14	1.22	1.21	1.24	1.23	1.2	1.16	1.12	1.1
Adachi	1.33	1.36	1.29	1.29	1.24	1.23	1.22	1.26	1.23	1.26	1.22	1.22	1.17	1.22	1.23	1.31	1.34	1.33	1.34	1.37	1.36	1.37	1.41	1.34	1.3	1.31	1.19	1.17
Katsushika	1.3	1.3	1.26	1.27	1.25	1.19	1.18	1.25	1.19	1.21	1.21	1.19	1.17	1.17	1.31	1.28	1.3	1.28	1.31	1.34	1.36	1.37	1.38	1.36	1.34	1.34	1.23	1.23
Edogawa	1.38	1.39	1.33	1.34	1.35	1.35	1.34	1.36	1.31	1.34	1.3	1.32	1.26	1.33	1.33	1.38	1.35	1.37	1.34	1.4	1.45	1.39	1.42	1.43	1.38	1.39	1.32	1.27

== Migration ==
Growth rate map of municipalities of Tokyo Metropolis, Japan 2005-2010

2015-2020 Increase 10.0 % and over 7.5 - 9.99 % 5.0 - 7.49 % 2.5 - 4.99 % 0.0 - 2.49 % Decrease 0.0 - 2.49 % 2.5 - 4.99 % 5.0 - 7.49 % 7.5 - 9.99 % 10.0 % and below

=== Domestic migration ===
With very few exceptions, Tokyo Prefecture has always consistently recorded a net positive migration (more people moving in than moving out) every year for decades. This has led to an extreme concentration of Japan's population, resources, and economic activity in the Greater Tokyo Area (Tokyo, Saitama, Chiba, Kanagawa). The net inflow is overwhelmingly concentrated among young adults, specifically those aged 15 to 29 who move for education and work. This constant infusion of young people helps Tokyo maintain a younger labor force compared to the rapidly aging rest of Japan.

	Inter-prefecture migration		
Year	Net change	In-migration	Out-migration
1956	167,882	546,543	378,661
1957	198,726	586,610	387,884
1958	183,505	584,337	400,832
1959	184,074	607,219	423,145
1960	169,533	628,000	458,467
1961	146,975	640,883	493,908
1962	113,357	670,924	557,567
1963	94,163	687,226	593,063
1964	34,880	689,503	654,623
1965	33,121	703,747	670,626
1966	11,335	700,172	688,837
1967	20,648	682,510	703,158
1968	43,930	696,221	740,151
1969	67,456	680,411	747,867
1970	100,142	668,483	768,625
1971	91,200	668,594	759,794
1972	121,081	649,026	770,107
1973	166,029	627,156	793,185
1974	155,839	565,001	720,840
1975	125,956	541,685	667,641
1976	125,229	529,407	654,636
1977	104,261	528,011	632,272
1978	102,280	513,497	615,777
1979	99,738	510,541	610,279
1980	92,482	490,980	583,462
1981	61,105	488,051	549,156
1982	37,463	491,394	528,857
1983	8,358	495,198	503,556
1984	145	486,139	485,994
1985	4,851	485,208	480,357
1986	6,129	486,672	492,801
1987	55,491	474,706	530,197
1988	71,570	455,801	527,371
1989	61,055	454,815	515,870
1990	50,441	453,116	503,557
1991	36,917	447,461	484,378
1992	51,186	434,519	485,705
1993	68,433	424,367	492,800
1994	60,951	420,050	481,001
1995	33,692	430,369	464,061
1996	6,963	431,545	438,508
1997	16,184	435,693	419,509
1998	30,704	440,098	409,394
1999	36,624	436,805	400,181
2000	53,245	444,118	390,873
2001	68,457	449,888	381,431
2002	72,050	442,925	370,875
2003	64,859	441,013	376,154
2004	71,558	433,270	361,712
2005	78,847	436,245	357,398
2006	78,545	435,453	356,908
2007	79,973	440,944	360,971
2008	71,242	421,538	350,296
2009	54,537	412,219	357,682
2010	45,290	394,518	349,228
2011	39,334	392,991	353,657
2012	53,686	398,615	344,929
2013	68,312	429,785	361,473
2014	73,385	429,278	355,893
2015	82,479	454,043	371,564
2016	72,339	442,537	370,198
2017	71,041	451,124	380,083
2018	77,908	457,880	379,972
2019	80,741	463,761	383,020
2020	29,618	431,175	401,557
2021	3,897	418,957	415,060
2022	35,563	438,782	403,219
2023	65,781	453,424	387,643

== Multiculturalism ==
Pie chart of the population group breakdown of Tokyo (January 1, 2026)
1. Japanese nationals (94.5%)
2. Foreign nationals (5.49%)
Foreign nationals in Tokyo (January 1, 2026)
1. Chinese (38.3%)
2. Koreans (11.6%)
3. Nepalis (8.08%)
4. Vietnamese (7.32%)
5. Burmese (5.00%)
6. Filipinos (4.80%)
7. Taiwanese (3.13%)
8. Others (21.8%)

Foreign population in Tokyo (as of January 1 of each year)

=== Foreign residents by nationality ===
Japanese and foreign nationals in Tokyo population pyramid in 2020T

The number of foreign residents has consistently risen over the past decade, a trend that resumed strongly after a temporary dip during the COVID-19 pandemic years. Foreign residents are increasingly vital to Tokyo's economy. The sustained growth has prompted the Tokyo Metropolitan Government and local ward offices to develop policies for greater multicultural coexistence, focusing on language support, social integration, and addressing housing and cultural needs.

Foreign population by nationality (2026)
Country	Population
Total	783,701
China	299,831
South Korea	90,766
Nepal	63,281
Vietnam	57,340
Myanmar	39,198
Philippines	37,651
Taiwan	24,550
United States	22,465
India	20,003
Indonesia	15,909
Bangladesh	9,577
Thailand	9,220
France	7,999
United Kingdom	7,367
Sri Lanka	5,786
Mongolia	5,550
Brazil	4,487
Canada	4,186
North Korea	4,019
Russia	3,930
Malaysia	3,608
Australia	3,595
Uzbekistan	3,533
Germany	3,430
Italy	2,576
Peru	2,210
Pakistan	1,916
Spain	1,749
Singapore	1,729
Turkey	1,375
Ukraine	1,312
Cambodia	1,253
Mexico	1,115
Iran	1,065
New Zealand	1,060

=== Foreign residents by district ===
Within Tokyo, the foreign population is concentrated in the 23 Special Wards (Ku), which account for the vast majority of foreign residents. High-Density Wards like Shinjuku, Toshima, and Arakawa have a particularly high ratio of foreign residents to the total ward population (in some cases exceeding 10%). Certain areas are known for distinct communities: Ikebukuro (Toshima Ward) is known for a large Chinese community (often called "Ikebukuro Chinatown"). Okubo (Shinjuku Ward) / Arakawa Ward is known for having established Nepalese and Vietnamese communities, sometimes referred to as "Little Kathmandu."

	1979	1984	1989	1994	1999	2004	2009	2010	2011	2012	2013	2014	2015	2016	2017	2018	2019	2020	2021	2022
Tokyo	110,862	128,046	203,677	269,889	273,978	355,289	408,284	418,116	422,226	406,096	390,674	394,410	417,442	449,042	486,346	521,500	551,683	577,329	546,436	517,881
Special Wards	93,328	108,683	178,372	228,277	228,557	295,819	340,130	348,857	353,219	339,448	327,266	330,586	350,863	378,642	410,650	439,959	465,191	485,967	456,873	430,444
Chiyoda	3,188	3,464	1,858	1,290	1,334	1,839	2,710	2,660	2,700	2,637	2,550	2,457	2,484	2,554	2,665	2,813	2,996	3,228	3,057	2,814
Chuo	459	618	703	1,085	1,442	2,715	4,877	4,909	5,031	4,977	4,947	4,916	5,153	5,547	6,176	6,991	7,651	8,474	8,291	8,062
Minato	7,563	9,739	11,315	12,068	14,017	17,154	22,354	21,826	21,706	20,620	18,853	18,104	18,420	18,486	18,992	19,522	20,057	20,314	18,718	16,929
Shinjuku	5,488	8,096	16,961	19,213	20,210	29,143	33,555	35,211	35,805	33,568	33,574	34,121	36,016	38,585	41,235	42,428	43,068	42,598	37,827	33,907
Bunkyo	2,669	3,265	5,079	5,512	5,305	6,506	7,179	7,276	7,508	7,352	6,935	7,087	7,696	8,333	9,174	9,887	10,808	11,635	10,333	9,746
Taito	3,098	3,230	5,116	5,329	6,348	9,882	11,817	12,411	12,863	12,662	12,503	12,802	13,248	14,034	14,600	14,862	15,433	15,757	14,788	13,896
Sumida	1,821	2,268	3,645	5,233	5,364	7,982	9,200	9,558	9,802	9,558	9,213	9,309	9,865	10,673	11,495	12,063	12,645	12,979	12,431	11,892
Koto	3,653	4,376	6,560	8,773	8,741	13,753	18,664	20,331	21,479	21,157	20,889	21,234	22,766	24,329	26,077	27,898	29,472	31,021	30,392	29,275
Shinagawa	3,841	4,753	7,280	9,041	8,322	9,995	11,833	11,872	11,604	11,274	10,566	10,446	10,663	11,020	11,742	12,234	13,042	13,900	13,342	12,538
Meguro	3,696	4,097	5,951	7,473	7,377	8,118	7,979	7,667	7,506	7,369	6,949	6,982	7,386	7,775	8,094	8,521	9,102	9,673	9,195	8,794
Ota	5,958	6,404	9,074	12,631	13,191	16,015	18,231	18,770	18,473	18,165	18,200	18,545	19,353	20,204	21,599	22,860	24,199	25,287	24,122	23,102
Setagaya	6,186	7,005	9,493	14,041	13,426	15,067	15,704	16,026	16,298	15,686	14,827	14,845	15,693	16,883	18,196	19,931	21,379	23,034	22,164	21,028
Shibuya	5,343	5,929	7,977	9,406	9,241	11,421	11,148	10,381	10,192	9,834	9,445	8,880	9,091	9,507	9,825	10,241	10,639	11,266	10,577	9,779
Nakano	2,991	3,611	8,473	12,088	10,346	11,484	11,656	12,185	12,636	11,418	10,610	10,949	12,283	13,872	15,693	17,956	19,326	20,095	17,809	15,759
Suginami	4,127	4,494	8,570	11,861	10,360	11,357	11,475	11,524	11,342	10,773	10,489	10,709	11,421	12,798	14,543	16,352	17,722	18,576	16,735	15,203
Toshima	3,619	5,049	14,654	15,386	13,452	16,833	17,163	18,575	19,868	19,324	19,065	19,533	21,616	24,540	27,060	29,010	30,223	29,672	26,458	24,200
Kita	2,592	3,152	7,950	10,035	10,069	13,743	15,530	16,176	16,063	15,451	14,248	14,558	16,005	17,609	19,552	20,954	22,621	23,550	22,271	21,470
Arakawa	5,985	5,892	7,705	9,486	9,604	13,026	15,709	15,508	15,869	15,667	15,313	15,559	16,188	16,885	17,831	18,564	19,131	19,298	18,264	17,570
Itabashi	2,884	3,363	7,949	12,140	11,842	15,364	17,625	18,471	18,355	17,337	16,234	16,714	18,022	20,147	22,667	24,719	26,759	28,782	27,254	25,663
Nerima	3,224	3,704	6,757	10,063	10,080	12,351	13,735	13,999	13,912	13,017	12,740	12,858	13,552	14,662	16,422	18,240	19,653	21,490	20,128	18,829
Adachi	7,998	8,553	12,048	16,117	17,039	21,431	23,222	23,291	23,443	23,059	22,282	22,516	23,679	25,541	27,417	29,726	31,706	34,040	33,606	33,138
Katsushika	3,799	3,885	5,659	7,717	8,244	11,297	14,175	14,527	14,832	14,163	13,719	13,966	14,969	16,545	18,768	20,730	21,849	23,126	22,363	21,630
Edogawa	3,146	3,736	7,595	12,289	13,203	19,343	24,589	25,703	25,932	24,380	23,115	23,496	25,294	28,113	30,827	33,457	35,710	38,172	36,748	35,220
Western Tokyo	17,376	19,148	25,016	41,046	44,758	58,539	67,237	68,334	68,079	65,745	62,590	62,957	65,657	69,386	74,633	80,364	85,300	90,092	88,306	86,138
Hachioji	1,136	1,334	1,870	3,925	4,801	7,610	8,939	9,292	9,162	9,072	8,983	9,020	9,475	10,060	11,113	12,219	12,936	13,210	13,137	12,821
Tachikawa	1,471	1,357	1,442	2,231	2,483	3,235	3,576	3,685	3,622	3,504	3,294	3,197	3,298	3,563	3,859	4,114	4,374	4,598	4,650	4,723
Musashino	858	934	1,377	2,260	2,176	2,439	2,396	2,397	2,330	2,297	2,180	2,277	2,480	2,583	2,817	3,038	3,240	3,364	3,223	3,083
Mitaka	1,099	1,179	1,758	2,585	2,693	2,871	3,204	3,103	3,107	2,976	2,844	2,794	2,958	3,013	3,376	3,635	3,813	3,943	3,673	3,516
Ome	257	235	438	1,348	1,114	1,310	1,553	1,551	1,626	1,592	1,445	1,421	1,454	1,566	1,646	1,775	1,877	1,955	1,986	2,037
Fuchu	1,145	1,202	1,664	2,550	3,058	3,836	4,403	4,544	4,475	4,279	4,106	4,110	4,277	4,468	4,676	4,940	5,302	5,604	5,312	5,106
Akishima	1,232	1,219	1,225	1,772	1,901	2,159	2,200	2,237	2,187	2,130	2,010	2,048	2,192	2,327	2,467	2,606	2,688	2,784	2,755	2,736
Chofu	1,991	2,100	2,454	3,004	3,159	3,543	3,952	4,018	4,062	3,853	3,550	3,534	3,633	3,799	4,037	4,348	4,629	4,824	4,550	4,385
Machida	847	1,217	1,625	2,304	2,790	4,052	5,410	5,342	5,303	5,076	4,747	4,780	4,902	5,144	5,505	5,852	6,228	6,862	7,090	7,259
Koganei	400	485	849	1,372	1,513	2,195	2,417	2,421	2,380	2,238	2,096	1,999	2,038	2,143	2,379	2,517	2,792	2,985	2,815	2,687
Kodaira	1,883	2,082	2,373	3,129	3,036	3,967	4,145	4,273	4,275	4,002	3,906	3,961	4,123	4,296	4,561	4,998	5,204	5,451	5,091	4,838
Hino	400	433	617	1,470	1,563	2,123	2,422	2,498	2,519	2,486	2,407	2,449	2,561	2,719	2,805	3,001	3,139	3,343	3,367	3,235
Higashimurayama	428	502	623	1,103	1,041	1,653	2,114	2,285	2,341	2,349	2,093	2,088	2,255	2,391	2,524	2,764	2,826	3,008	2,999	3,008
Kokubunji	302	351	581	1,005	1,149	1,535	1,705	1,707	1,749	1,667	1,635	1,675	1,731	1,838	1,910	2,088	2,365	2,572	2,567	2,526
Kunitachi	343	424	597	975	1,130	1,379	1,511	1,448	1,477	1,411	1,286	1,271	1,314	1,399	1,509	1,584	1,706	1,839	1,761	1,657
Fussa	739	716	821	1,443	1,788	2,256	2,376	2,427	2,398	2,443	2,400	2,533	2,712	3,025	3,359	3,662	3,816	3,809	3,621	3,382
Komae	276	281	397	630	608	799	926	973	960	933	909	975	1,018	1,088	1,168	1,282	1,312	1,408	1,359	1,302
Higashiyamato	277	364	486	691	692	829	1,014	1,057	1,045	1,038	1,011	1,046	1,074	1,087	1,090	1,130	1,157	1,185	1,201	1,208
Kiyose	156	171	248	482	554	784	978	1,044	1,039	1,004	967	993	1,077	1,112	1,136	1,216	1,262	1,308	1,335	1,308
Higashikurume	412	546	591	904	1,060	1,365	1,756	1,772	1,777	1,653	1,592	1,634	1,700	1,804	1,822	1,955	2,092	2,221	2,265	2,242
Musashimurayama	283	317	368	841	834	991	1,197	1,229	1,219	1,177	1,071	1,100	1,159	1,369	1,427	1,588	1,640	1,732	1,783	1,786
Tama	247	357	672	1,299	1,391	1,953	2,259	2,336	2,306	2,229	2,038	2,022	2,047	2,155	2,402	2,445	2,648	2,838	2,755	2,700
Inagi	211	245	329	524	731	865	1,123	1,088	1,108	1,087	1,082	1,082	1,115	1,110	1,183	1,231	1,321	1,448	1,451	1,506
Hamura	158	202	300	1,103	1,130	1,654	1,802	1,653	1,573	1,401	1,277	1,195	1,175	1,150	1,233	1,315	1,392	1,444	1,472	1,402
Akiruno	207	164	192	444	459	560	644	651	667	635	640	626	650	699	740	752	839	973	1,038	1,042
Nishitokyo	618	731	1,119	1,652	1,904	2,576	3,215	3,303	3,372	3,213	3,021	3,127	3,239	3,478	3,889	4,309	4,702	5,384	5,050	4,643

== Social issues ==
=== Marriage and divorce ===
Though Tokyo attracts a massive inflow of young adults mostly single men and women in their 20s and early 30s from other prefectures for education and work, it has the highest percentage of single adults and the highest average age at first marriage in the country.

	Marriage	Divorce	Average age at first marriage (husband)	Average age at first marriage (wife)
1900	14,451	2,375	...	...
1901	16,058	2,477	...	...
1902	15,810	2,611	...	...
1903	15,206	2,809	...	...
1904	16,483	2,707	...	...
1905	15,754	2,497	...	...
1906	16,535	2,773	...	...
1907	20,674	2,642	...	...
1908	22,522	2,816	...	...
1909	19,509	2,777	...	...
1910	19,651	2,712	...	...
1911	20,180	2,666	...	...
1912	20,413	2,748	...	...
1913	21,329	2,986	...	...
1914	22,389	2,854	...	...
1915	21,267	2,951	...	...
1916	22,382	2,932	...	...
1917	24,014	2,843	...	...
1918	26,782	2,908	...	...
1919	26,951	2,983	...	...
1920	30,033	2,887	...	...
1921	29,476	2,795	...	...
1922	29,856	2,888	...	...
1923	26,315	2,315	...	...
1924	29,522	2,615	...	...
1925	32,752	2,770	...	...
1926	31,555	2,777	...	...
1927	30,675	2,851	...	...
1928	30,979	2,835	...	...
1929	32,760	3,024	...	...
1930	33,406	3,226	...	...
1931	32,949	3,218	...	...
1932	34,772	3,548	...	...
1933	34,220	3,520	...	...
1934	37,672	3,523	...	...
1935	41,313	3,656	...	...
1936	41,056	3,525	...	...
1937	51,330	3,668	...	...
1938	42,307	3,496	...	...
1939	47,492	3,803	...	...
1940	56,996	3,963	...	...
1941	64,049	3,983	...	...
1942	55,610	3,533	...	...
1943	58,438	3,464	...	...
1944	...	...	...	...
1945	...	...	...	...
1946	...	...	...	...
1947	49,800	4,661	27.8	24.1
1948	59,128	5,386	27.8	24.2
1949	51,595	6,066	27.7	24.2
1950	51,362	6,646	27.7	24.3
1951	54,200	7,007	27.6	24.3
1952	57,118	7,005	27.7	24.4
1953	63,736	6,904	27.8	24.6
1954	69,486	7,573	27.9	24.7
1955	74,447	7,429	28.1	24.9
1956	76,970	7,285	28.1	25.0
1957	91,370	7,426	28.1	25.1
1958	101,297	7,705	28.1	25.1
1959	111,265	7,834	28.1	25.2
1960	119,495	7,719	28.1	25.2
1961	127,862	7,952	28.0	25.2
1962	137,106	8,449	27.9	25.2
1963	141,450	8,736	27.9	25.2
1964	145,117	8,989	27.9	25.1
1965	147,407	9,834	27.8	25.1
1966	141,049	10,302	27.8	25.1
1967	137,769	10,961	27.8	25.1
1968	137,597	10,993	27.8	25.1
1969	138,540	11,761	27.7	25.0
1970	140,748	12,297	27.5	24.9
1971	147,155	13,188	27.4	24.9
1972	145,712	13,999	27.3	24.9
1973	135,323	13,807	27.3	25.1
1974	121,513	14,053	27.4	25.3
1975	111,176	14,503	27.6	25.5
1976	101,939	15,002	27.9	25.7
1977	94,425	15,114	28.1	25.9
1978	90,222	15,394	28.3	26.0
1979	89,599	15,473	28.5	26.0
1980	87,922	15,969	28.6	26.1
1981	87,401	17,396	28.7	26.2
1982	87,699	18,077	28.8	26.2
1983	86,121	19,548	28.8	26.3
1984	83,139	19,239	28.9	26.3
1985	83,021	17,955	29.0	26.3
1986	79,960	18,271	29.1	26.5
1987	78,532	17,152	29.2	26.6
1988	79,276	16,884	29.2	26.6
1989	80,883	17,593	29.3	26.7
1990	81,920	17,935	29.3	26.7
1991	83,171	19,400	29.3	26.7
1992	82,371	20,211	29.3	26.9
1993	85,518	21,114	29.4	27.0
1994	83,563	21,372	29.5	27.1
1995	84,286	21,548	29.6	27.3
1996	84,007	22,273	29.7	27.4
1997	81,002	23,690	29.7	27.6
1998	82,589	25,685	29.9	27.7
1999	81,287	26,375	30.0	27.9
2000	87,360	27,032	30.1	28.0
2001	88,538	28,593	30.4	28.3
2002	84,623	28,780	30.5	28.4
2003	84,755	28,211	30.7	28.7
2004	84,618	27,123	30.9	28.9
2005	85,382	26,984	31.2	29.2
2006	89,413	26,347	31.3	29.3
2007	89,243	26,627	31.5	29.5
2008	91,196	26,300	31.5	29.6
2009	91,028	26,803	31.6	29.7
2010	91,197	26,335	31.8	29.9
2011	86,888	24,927	31.9	30.1
2012	89,301	25,329	32.1	30.3
2013	88,067	24,855	32.2	30.4
2014	87,000	23,653	32.3	30.5
2015	87,169	24,135	32.4	30.5
2016	86,010	23,470	32.3	30.5
2017	84,993	23,055	32.3	30.4
2018	82,716	22,706	32.3	30.4
2019	86,059	22,707	32.3	30.5
2020	73,931	20,783	32.1	30.4
2021	69,813	19,605		
2022	75,179	19,255		
2023	71,774	20,016		

=== Health ===
==== Infant mortality ====
Infant mortality
Year	Number	Rate
1906	10,214	180.0
1907	12,576	163.3
1908	14,160	189.4
1909	14,690	189.4
1910	14,138	173.8
1911	14,462	175.0
1912	13,507	157.6
1913	14,360	163.0
1914	14,467	155.8
1915	16,722	178.5
1916	16,327	178.9
1917	17,485	179.8
1918	17,878	187.8
1919	17,784	168.5
1920	18,456	167.6
1921	19,745	163.5
1922	19,144	158.6
1923	20,679	175.7
1924	17,166	139.0
1925	19,188	133.0
1926	17,301	125.5
1927	17,754	121.9
1928	19,658	129.1
1929	19,256	130.2
1930	14,768	97.5
1931	16,739	105.8
1932	14,640	90.8
1933	15,651	95.4
1934	14,505	94.2
1935	13,970	79.4
1936	13,442	78.8
1937	13,725	79.7
1938	13,343	84.7
1939	12,652	76.4
1940	11,462	59.5
1941	13,882	62.2
1942	14,047	62.8
1943	15,385	64.6
1944	...	...
1945	...	...
1946	...	...
1947	9,813	62.4
1948	7,680	47.6
1949	7,874	47.0
1950	6,363	42.9
1951	5,809	42.3
1952	4,580	34.3
1953	4,681	37.2
1954	3,832	30.3
1955	3,408	26.7
1956	3,270	25.7
1957	3,441	26.2
1958	3,425	23.4
1959	3,491	22.8
1960	3,358	20.4
1961	3,458	20.1
1962	3,374	18.4
1963	3,006	15.5
1964	3,174	15.3
1965	3,053	13.5
1966	2,468	13.9
1967	2,786	11.8
1968	2,848	12.4
1969	2,741	12.0
1970	2,630	11.5
1971	2,551	11.0
1972	2,360	10.2
1973	2,218	9.8
1974	1,891	9.0
1975	1,654	8.9
1976	1,438	8.3
1977	1,236	7.5
1978	1,200	7.6
1979	1,075	7.2
1980	934	6.7
1981	836	6.1
1982	792	5.9
1983	718	5.4
1984	671	5.1
1985	622	4.9
1986	591	4.9
1987	559	4.7
1988	474	4.1
1989	474	4.5
1990	438	4.2
1991	400	3.9
1992	430	4.3
1993	467	4.8
1994	433	4.2
1995	423	4.4
1996	368	3.8
1997	384	3.9
1998	358	3.6
1999	325	3.3
2000	354	3.5
2001	298	3.0
2002	295	2.9
2003	293	3.0
2004	260	2.6
2005	257	2.7
2006	290	2.9
2007	278	2.7
2008	261	2.5
2009	246	2.3
2010	212	2.0
2011	216	2.0
2012	236	2.2
2013	215	2.0
2014	205	1.9
2015	189	1.7
2016	222	2.0
2017	169	1.6
2018	183	1.7
2019	146	1.4
2020	135	1.4
2021	160	1.7
2022	148	1.6
2023	135	1.6

==== Life expectancy ====
Age	2010				2020				2023			
Age	overall	male	female	sex gap	overall	male	female	sex gap	overall	male	female	sex gap
0	83.03	79.70	86.26	6.56	84.97	81.86	87.96	6.10	84.62	81.59	87.60	6.01
1	82.20	78.87	85.43	6.56	84.09	80.97	87.09	6.12	83.74	80.71	86.74	6.03
5	78.26	74.93	81.48	6.55	80.13	77.02	83.13	6.11	79.80	76.76	82.79	6.03
10	73.29	69.96	76.51	6.55	75.16	72.04	78.15	6.11	74.83	71.79	77.81	6.02
15	68.33	65.01	71.55	6.54	70.19	67.07	73.19	6.12	69.85	66.82	72.85	6.03
20	63.39	60.08	66.60	6.52	65.25	62.14	68.24	6.10	64.95	61.91	67.94	6.03
25	58.50	55.21	61.67	6.46	60.35	57.26	63.31	6.05	60.07	57.05	63.04	5.99
30	53.61	50.35	56.75	6.40	55.44	52.36	58.39	6.03	55.17	52.17	58.13	5.96
35	48.74	45.49	51.85	6.36	50.53	47.47	53.46	5.99	50.27	47.29	53.21	5.92
40	43.90	40.68	46.98	6.30	45.65	42.61	48.56	5.95	45.40	42.43	48.31	5.88
45	39.13	35.94	42.16	6.22	40.83	37.82	43.69	5.87	40.58	37.63	43.46	5.83
50	34.45	31.33	37.40	6.07	36.09	33.11	38.90	5.79	35.81	32.91	38.63	5.72
55	29.92	26.88	32.75	5.87	31.47	28.54	34.20	5.66	31.19	28.33	33.95	5.62
60	25.56	22.66	28.19	5.53	26.97	24.15	29.57	5.42	26.69	23.92	29.32	5.40
65	21.39	18.70	23.72	5.02	22.69	20.01	25.06	5.05	22.38	19.75	24.79	5.04
70	17.40	14.98	19.36	4.38	18.61	16.17	20.66	4.49	18.28	15.87	20.37	4.50
75	13.62	11.52	15.19	3.67	14.81	12.67	16.45	3.78	14.47	12.35	16.17	3.82
80	10.21	8.43	11.36	2.93	11.30	9.52	12.49	2.97	11.02	9.26	12.25	2.99
85	7.37	5.97	8.11	2.14	8.20	6.79	8.95	2.16	7.96	6.60	8.77	2.17
90	5.14	4.15	5.54	1.39	5.70	4.71	6.09	1.38	5.54	4.57	5.97	1.40
95	3.51	2.90	3.69	0.79	3.83	3.24	3.99	0.75	3.76	3.15	3.93	0.78
100	2.43	2.09	2.49	0.40	2.58	2.29	2.62	0.33	2.55	2.24	2.60	0.36
105	1.76	1.61	1.78	0.17	1.81	1.71	1.82	0.11	1.81	1.68	1.82	0.14
110	1.39	1.33	1.39	0.06	1.40	1.38	1.40	0.02	1.40	1.37	1.40	0.03

Data source: National Institute of Population and Social Security Research

==== Percentage surviving ====
The percentage surviving, is the percent of the population that would survive to certain age, if their life conditions in a given year, were extrapolated to their whole life.

Data for 2020. The values are rounded. Difference and ratio were calculated with raw data.

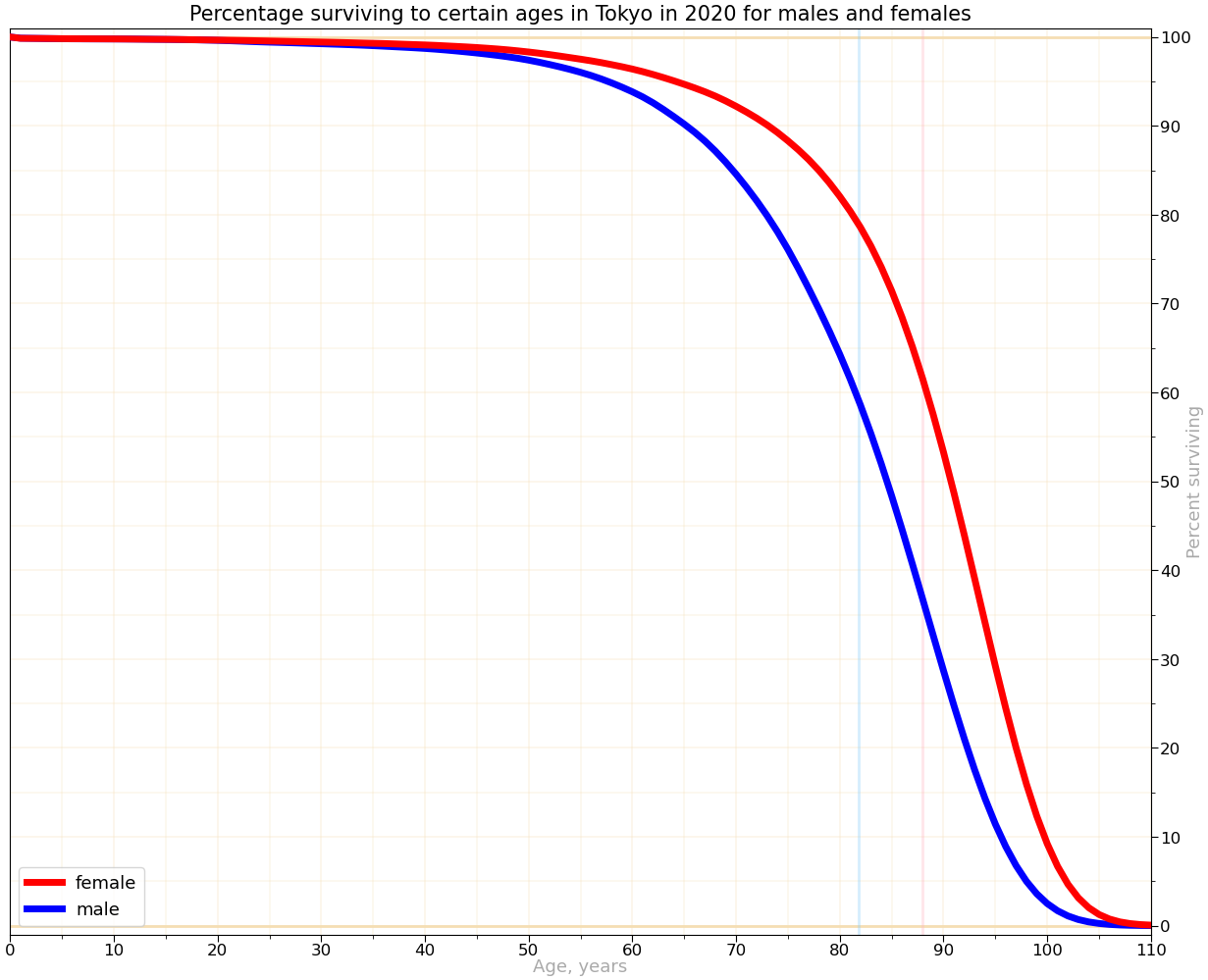
The percent of people in Tokyo surviving to certain ages by gender, 2020

Age	Percentage surviving		F / M
Age	male	female	F / M
1	99.9	99.9	1.00
5	99.8	99.8	1.00
10	99.8	99.8	1.00
15	99.7	99.7	1.00
20	99.6	99.7	1.00
25	99.4	99.6	1.00
30	99.2	99.4	1.00
35	99.0	99.3	1.00
40	98.7	99.1	1.00
45	98.2	98.8	1.01
50	97.4	98.3	1.01
55	96.0	97.5	1.02
60	93.8	96.4	1.03
65	90.2	94.7	1.05
70	84.6	92.2	1.09
75	76.1	88.3	1.16
80	64.3	82.1	1.28
85	48.4	71.4	1.48
90	28.7	53.3	1.86
95	11.4	29.2	2.56
100	2.490	9.227	3.71
105	0.246	1.256	5.11
110	0.010	0.062	6.20

Data source: National Institute of Population and Social Security Research

== See also ==
- Demographics of Japan
- List of mergers in Tokyo
- Greater Tokyo area
