= Yodobashi =

Dissolved municipality in Tokyo, Japan

Coordinates: 35°41′49″N 139°42′16″E

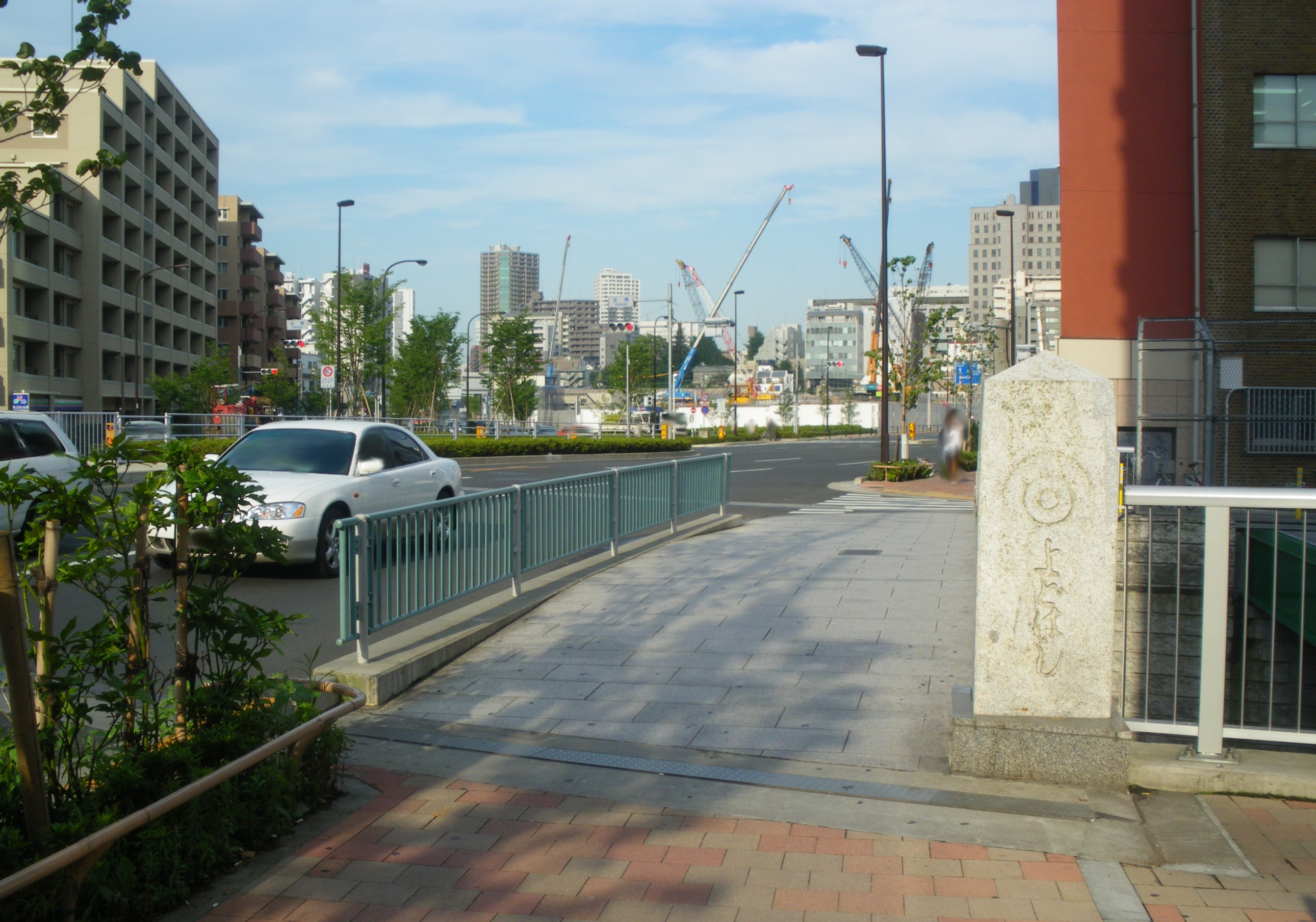
A photo of Yodobashi Bridge, Shinjuku-ku and Nakano-ku, Tokyo, Japan.

Yodobashi ward (淀橋区, Yodobashi-ku) is one of the 35 former wards of Tokyo-Fu, Tokyo City. On October 1, 1932, the towns of Yodobashi, Okubo, Totsuka, and Ochiai were merged into Yodobashi ward. In 1947, it was merged with Yotsuya and Ushigome wards of Tokyo City to form the present-day Shinjuku ward. It covered 9.33 square kilometres (3.60 sq mi) and 51,090 people as of October 1, 1945, shortly after the end of World War II and after mass loss of population due to Bombing of Tokyo. Yodobashi Camera is a store with its name taken from the town and ward.
