= Tokyo City =

1889–1943 municipality in Japan

Tokyo City 東京市
- City of Japan
- 1889–1943
- Coat of arms

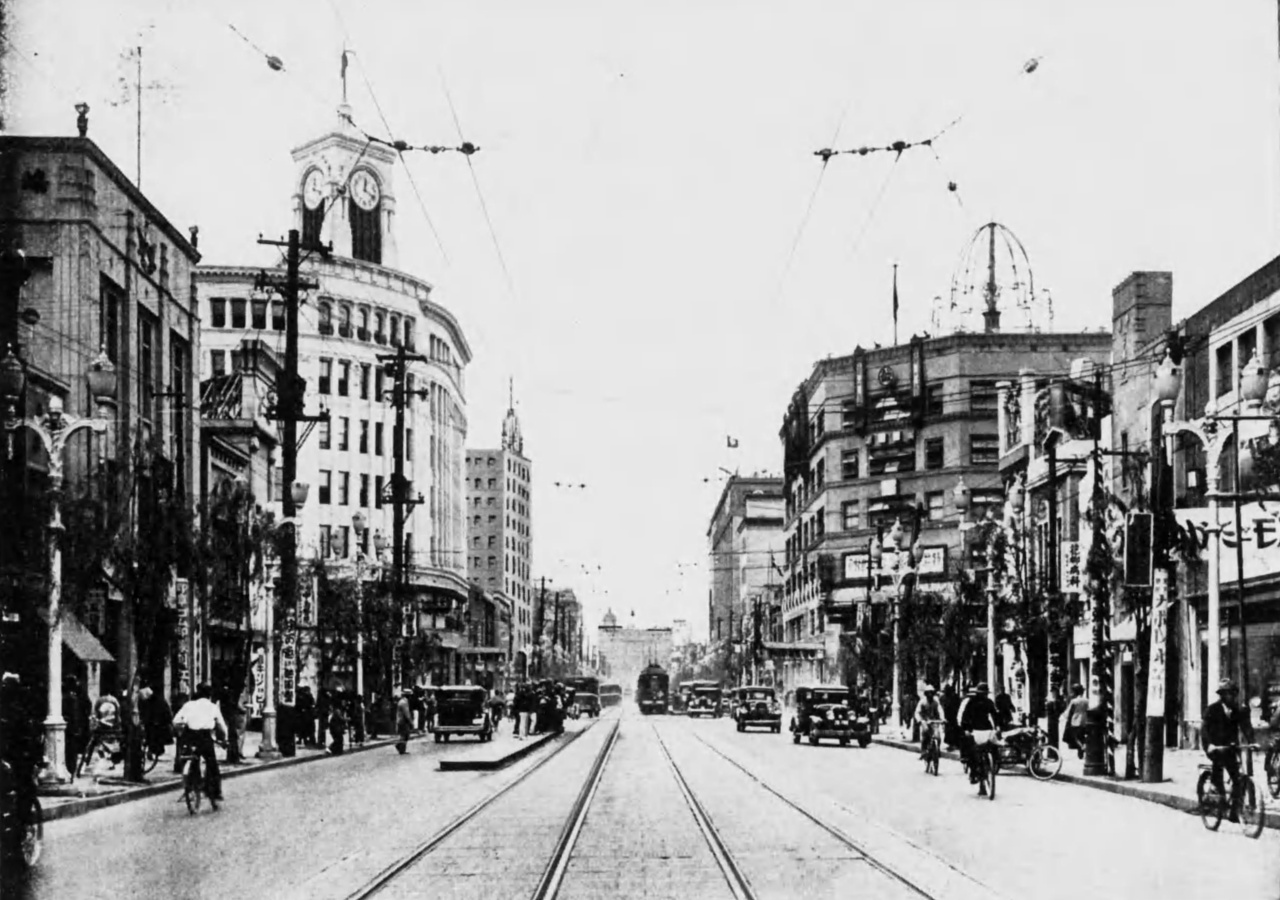
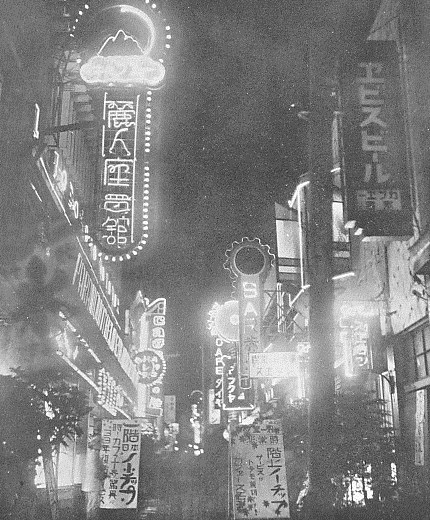
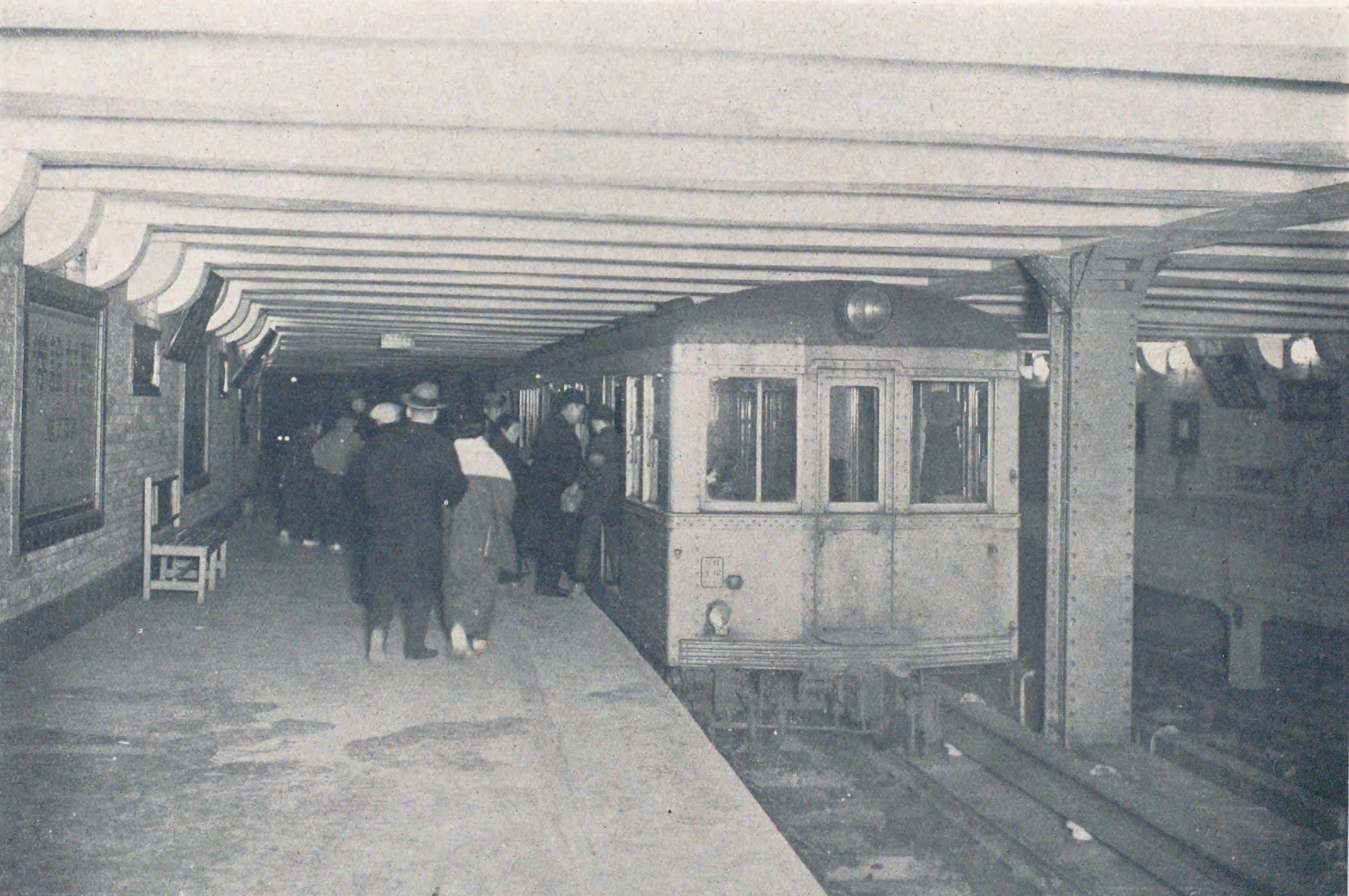
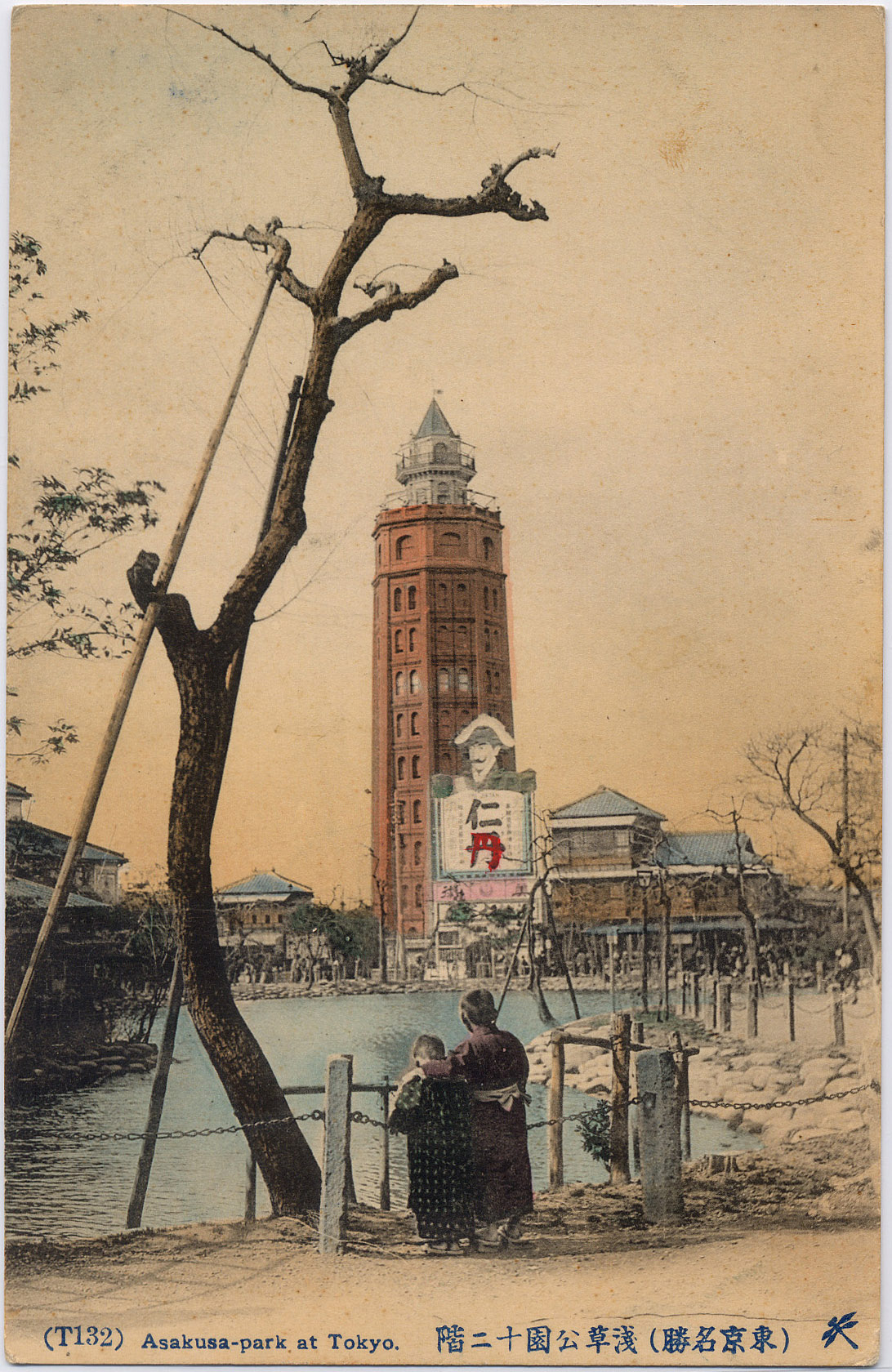
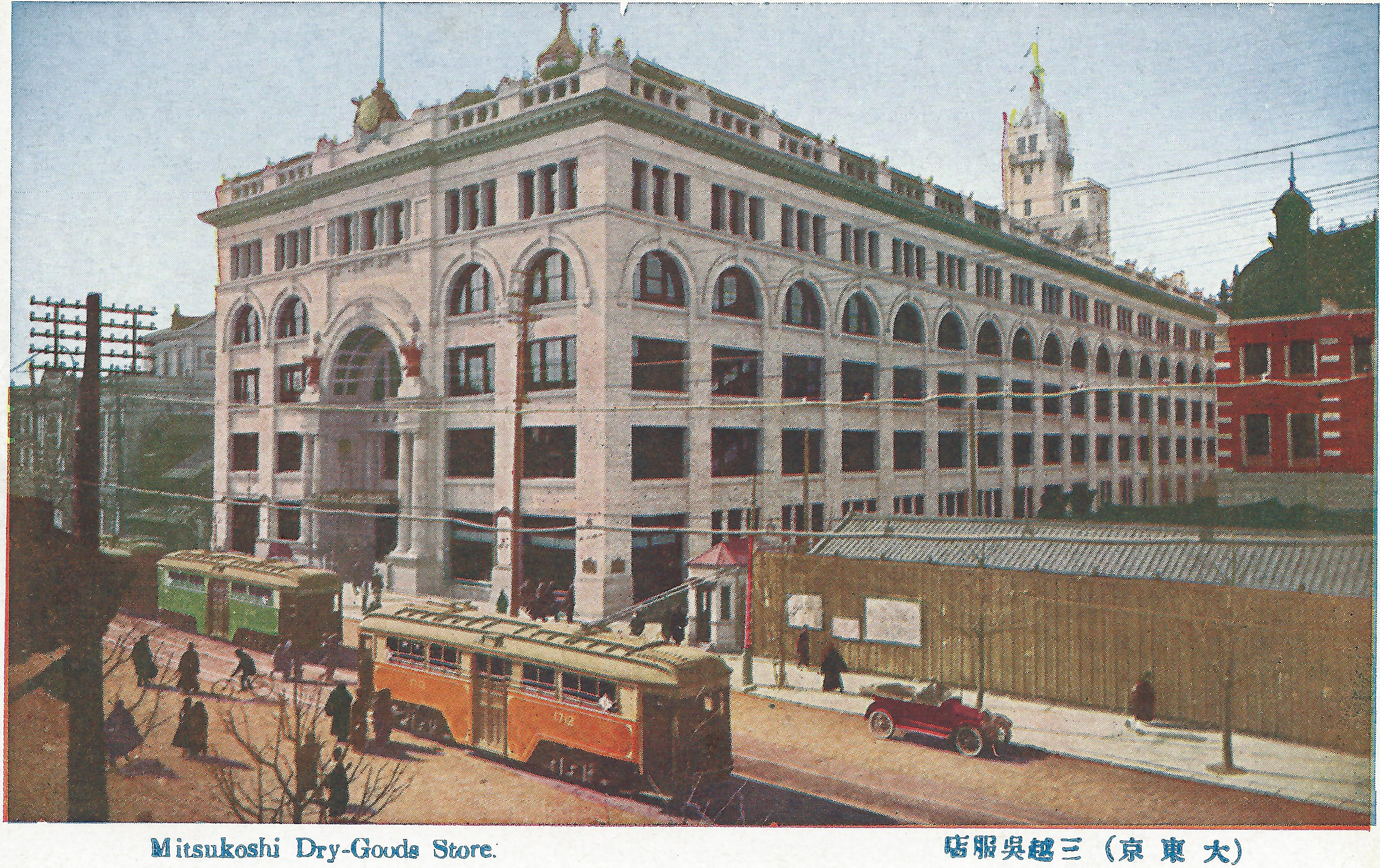
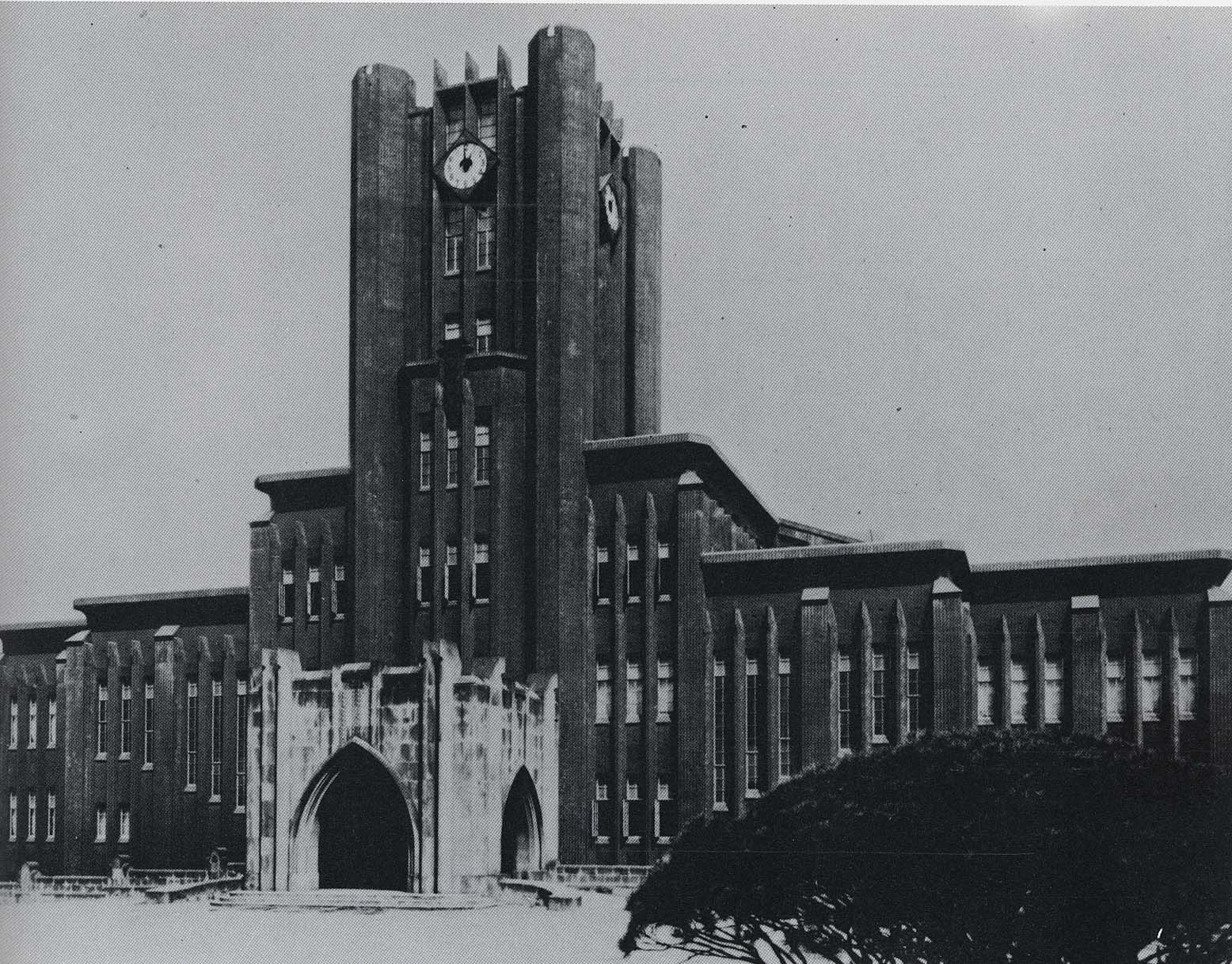
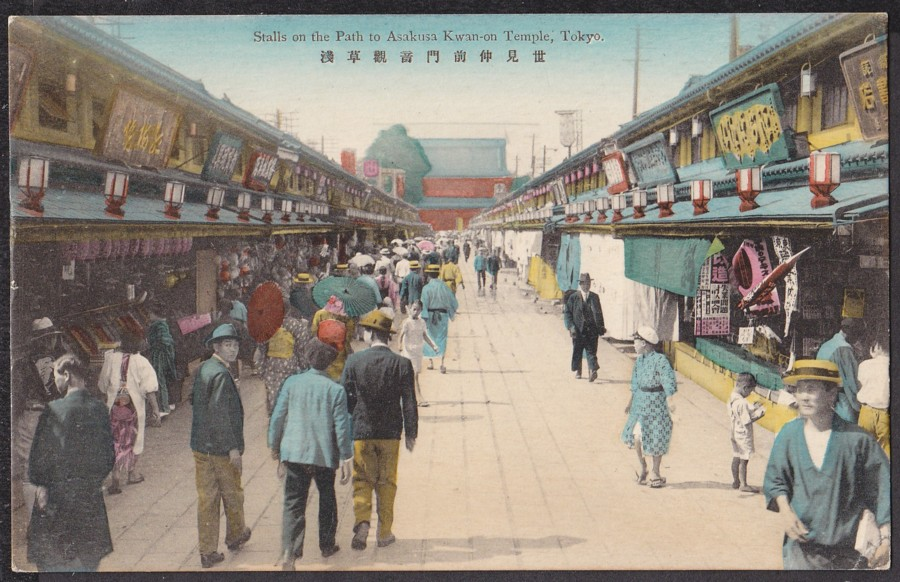
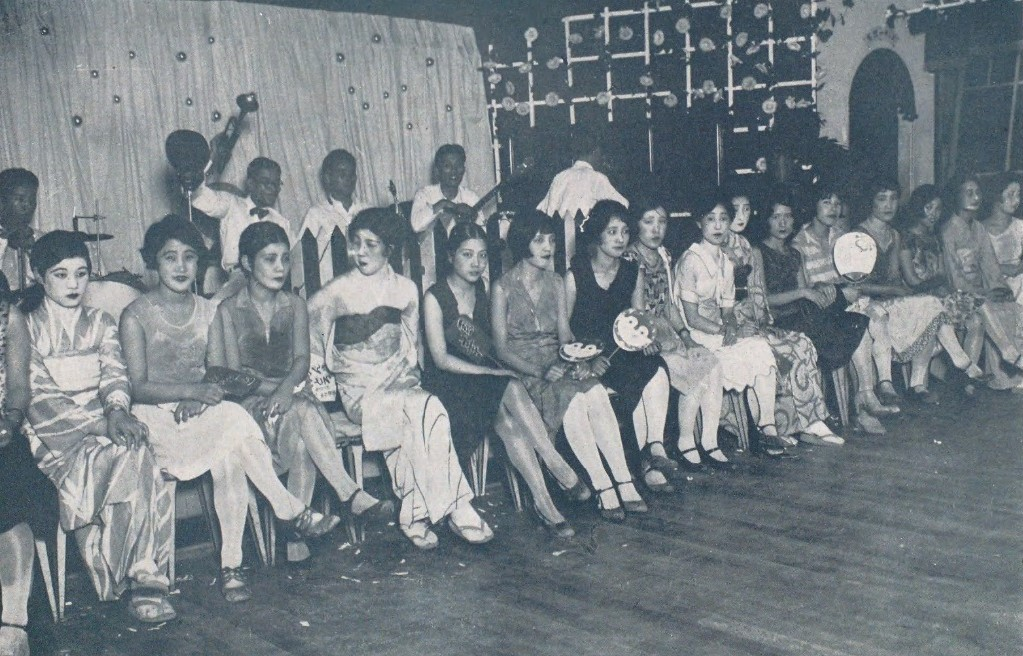
- Ginza Shinjuku Tokyo Underground Railway Ryōunkaku Mitsukoshi in Nihonbashi University of Tokyo Asakusa Dance Hall
- History
  - Established: 1 May 1889
  - Disestablished: 1 July 1943
- Political subdivisions: 35 wards
Preceded by	Succeeded by
Edo	Special wards of Tokyo

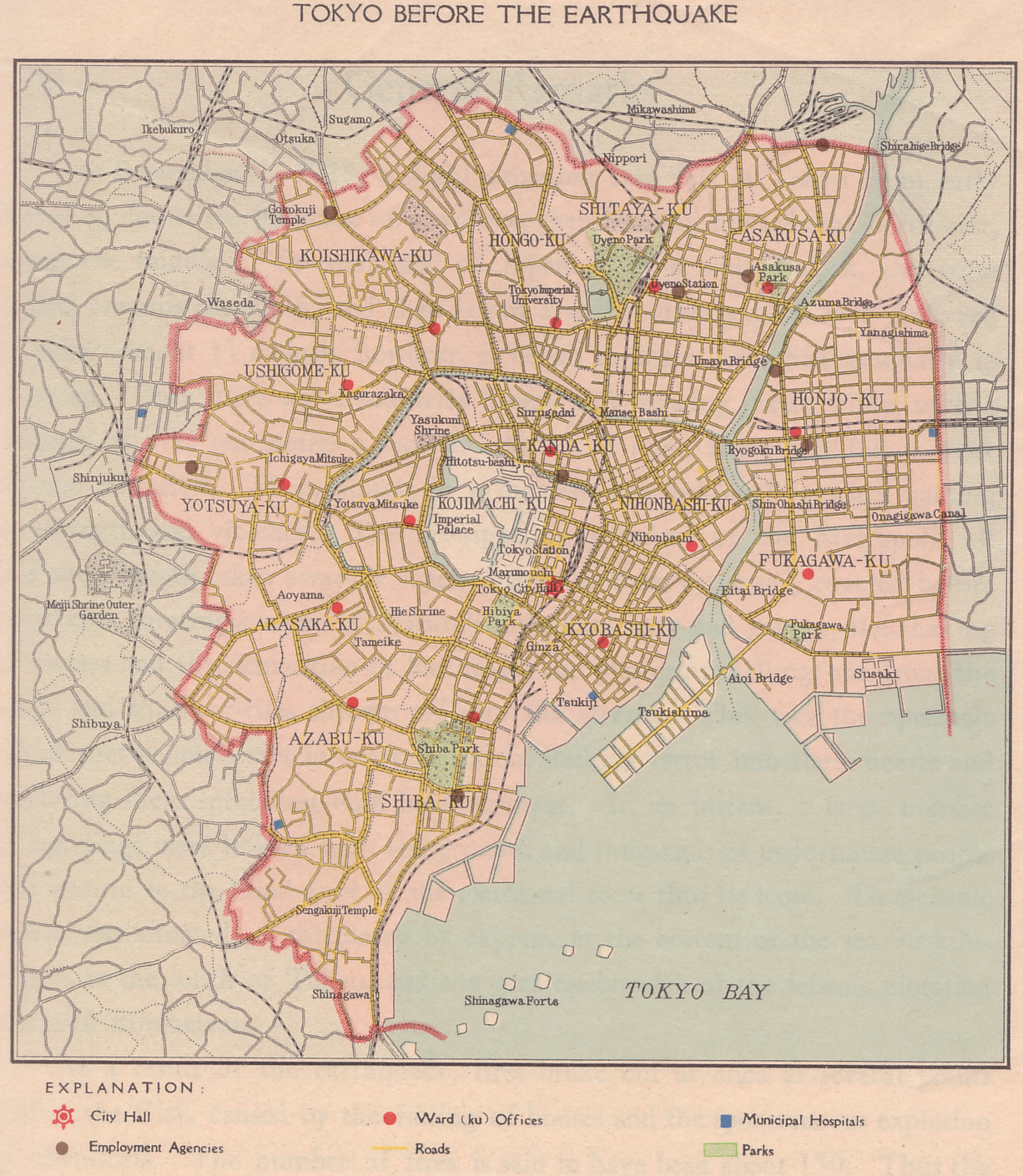
Map of Tokyo City before the 1923 Great Kantō earthquake

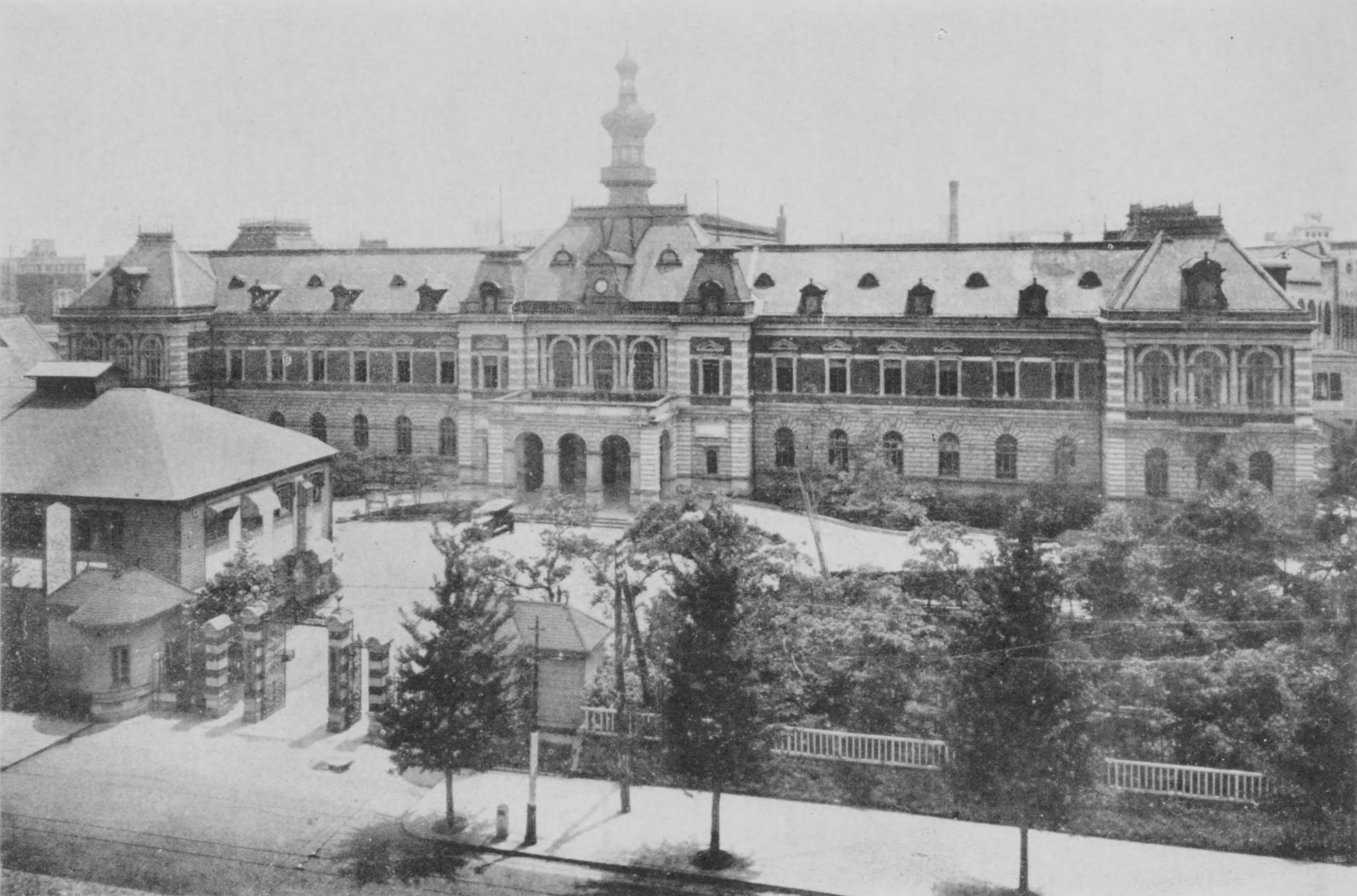
Tokyo Prefectural Office and Tokyo City Hall

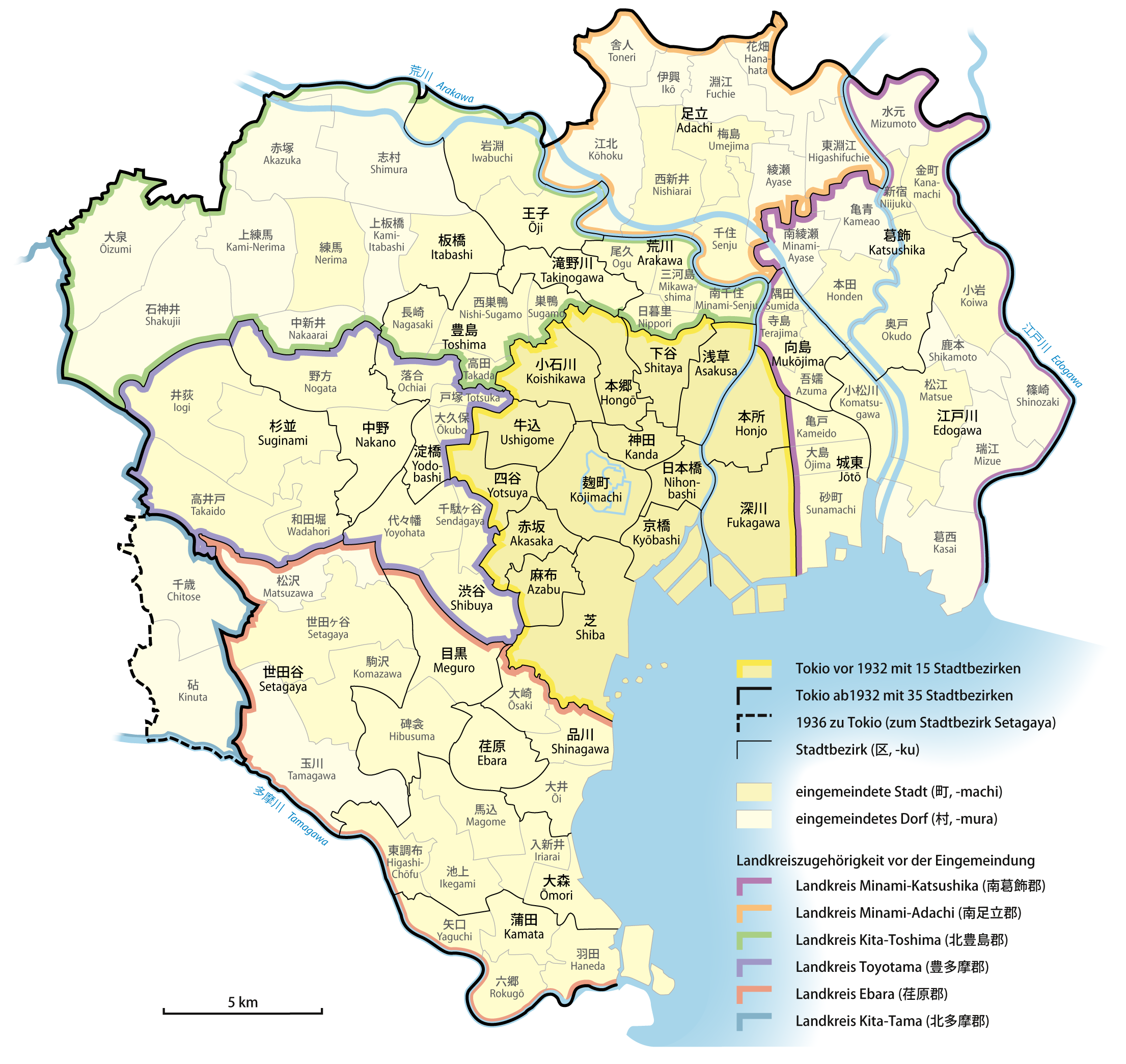
Administrative map of "Greater Tokyo" (大東京 Dai-Tōkyō), the merger of 82 municipalities into Tokyo City in 1932, and two smaller mergers in 1936

Tokyo City (東京市, Tōkyō-shi) was a municipality in Japan and capital of Tokyo Prefecture (or Tokyo-fu) which existed from 1 May 1889 until the establishment of Tokyo Metropolis on 1 July 1943. The historical boundaries of Tokyo City are now occupied by the special wards of Tokyo. The defunct city and its prefecture became what is now Tokyo, also known as the Tokyo Metropolis or, ambiguously, Tokyo Prefecture.

== History ==
In 1868, the city of Edo, seat of the Tokugawa government, was renamed Tokyo, and the offices of Tokyo Prefecture (-fu) were opened. The extent of Tokyo Prefecture was initially limited to the former Edo city, but rapidly augmented to be comparable with the present Tokyo Metropolis. In 1878, the Meiji government's reorganization of local governments (Note: The 郡区町村編制法 gun-ku-chō-son hensei-hō, of 1878, the law on the organization of gun (counties/districts), ku (cities/districts/wards), towns and villages, one of the "three new laws" on local government of 1878 that also created prefectural taxation rights and prefectural assemblies (地方三新法, chihō san-shinpō, 地方三新法)) subdivided prefectures into counties or districts (gun, further subdivided into towns and villages, later reorganized similar to Prussian districts) and districts or wards (ku) which were in ordinary prefectures cities as a whole, e.g. today's Hiroshima City (-shi) was then Hiroshima-ku; the three major cities of Tokyo, Osaka and Kyoto were each subdivided into several such wards. In Tokyo Prefecture, this created 15 wards (listed below) and six counties/districts.

In 1888, the central government created the legal framework for the current system of cities (shi) (Note: 市制, shi-sei 市制, the municipal code for cities of 1888. In the same year, the municipal code for towns on villages, the 町村制, chō-son-sei 町村制, was created. The county governments were reorganized in 1890 by the 郡制 (gun-sei )) that granted some basic local autonomy rights – with some similarities to Prussia's system of local self-government as Meiji government advisor Albert Mosse heavily influenced the organization of local government. But under a special imperial regulation, (Note: 市制特例 shisei-tokureiof 1889) Tokyo City, like Kyoto City and Osaka City, initially did not maintain a separate mayor; instead, the (appointed) governor of Tokyo Prefecture served as mayor of Tokyo City. The Tokyo city council/assembly (Tōkyō-shikai) was first elected in May 1889. Each ward also retained its own assembly. City and prefectural government were separated in 1898., and the government began to appoint a separate mayor of Tokyo City in 1898, but retained ward-level legislation, which continues to this day in the special ward system. From 1926, the mayor was elected by the elected city council/assembly from its own ranks. The city hall of Tokyo was located in the Yūrakuchō district, on a site now occupied by the Tokyo International Forum.

Tokyo became the second-largest city in the world (population 4.9 million) upon absorbing several outlying districts in July 1932, giving the city a total of 35 wards.

In 1943, the city was abolished along with Tokyo Prefecture to form Tokyo Metropolis and Tokyo Metropolitan Government, which was functionally a part of the central government of Japan: the governor of Tokyo became a Cabinet minister reporting directly to the Prime Minister. This system remained in place until 1947 when the current structure of the Tokyo Metropolitan Government was formed.

Tokyo's administrative structure before 1943 (not different from Ōsaka, Kyōto)
Tōkyō-fu ("Tokyo Prefecture")		
Tōkyō-shi ("Tokyo City")	Other cities (shi)	towns (machi) and villages (mura) (until 1920s subordinate to counties/districts) (island municipalities subordinate to subprefectures)
Wards (ku)	Other cities (shi)	towns (machi) and villages (mura) (until 1920s subordinate to counties/districts) (island municipalities subordinate to subprefectures)

== Wards ==
1889–1920 (15 wards)	1920–1932 (15 wards)	1932–1936 (35 wards)	1936–1947 (35 wards)	23 special wards of Tokyo Metropolis
Kōjimachi				Chiyoda
Kanda				Chiyoda
Nihonbashi				Chūō
Kyōbashi				Chūō
Shiba				Minato
Azabu				Minato
Akasaka				Minato
Yotsuya	Yotsuya			Shinjuku
Naito-Shinjuku-machi, Toyotama-gun	Yotsuya			Shinjuku
Ushigome				Shinjuku
Yodobashi-machi, Toyotama-gun		Yodobashi		Shinjuku
Ōkubo-machi, Toyotama-gun		Yodobashi		Shinjuku
Totsuka-machi, Toyotama-gun		Yodobashi		Shinjuku
Ochiai-machi, Toyotama-gun		Yodobashi		Shinjuku
Koishikawa				Bunkyō
Hongō				Bunkyō
Shitaya				Taitō
Asakusa				Taitō
Honjo				Sumida
Terashima-machi, Minami-Katsushika-gun		Mukojima		Sumida
Azuma-machi, Minami-Katsushika-gun		Mukojima		Sumida
Sumida-machi, Minami-Katsushika-gun		Mukojima		Sumida
Fukagawa				Kōtō
Kameido-machi, Minami-Katsushika-gun		Jōtō		Kōtō
Ōjima-machi, Minami-Katsushika-gun		Jōtō		Kōtō
Suna-machi, Minami-Katsushika-gun		Jōtō		Kōtō
Shinagawa-machi, Ebara-gun		Shinagawa		Shinagawa
Ōi-machi, Ebara-gun		Shinagawa		Shinagawa
Ōsaki-machi, Ebara-gun		Shinagawa		Shinagawa
Ebara-machi, Ebara-gun		Ebara		Shinagawa
Meguro-machi, Ebara-gun		Meguro		Meguro
Hibusuma-machi, Ebara-gun		Meguro		Meguro
Ōmori-machi, Ebara-gun		Ōmori		Ōta
Iriarai-machi, Ebara-gun		Ōmori		Ōta
Magome-machi, Ebara-gun		Ōmori		Ōta
Ikegami-machi, Ebara-gun		Ōmori		Ōta
Higashi-Chōfu-machi, Ebara-gun		Ōmori		Ōta
Kamata-machi, Ebara-gun		Kamata		Ōta
Yaguchi-machi, Ebara-gun		Kamata		Ōta
Rokugō-machi, Ebara-gun		Kamata		Ōta
Haneda-machi, Ebara-gun		Kamata		Ōta
Setagaya-machi, Ebara-gun		Setagaya	Setagaya	Setagaya
Komazawa-machi, Ebara-gun		Setagaya	Setagaya	Setagaya
Matsuzawa-mura, Ebara-gun		Setagaya	Setagaya	Setagaya
Tamagawa-mura, Ebara-gun		Setagaya	Setagaya	Setagaya
Kinuta-mura, Kita-Tama-gun			Setagaya	Setagaya
Chitose-mura, Kita-Tama-gun			Setagaya	Setagaya
Shibuya-machi, Toyotama-gun		Shibuya		Shibuya
Sendagaya-machi, Toyotama-gun		Shibuya		Shibuya
Yoyohata-machi, Toyotama-gun		Shibuya		Shibuya
Nakano-machi, Toyotama-gun		Nakano		Nakano
Nogata-machi, Toyotama-gun		Nakano		Nakano
Suginami-machi, Toyotama-gun		Suginami		Suginami
Wadabori-machi, Toyotama-gun		Suginami		Suginami
Iogi-machi, Toyotama-gun		Suginami		Suginami
Takaido-machi, Toyotama-gun		Suginami		Suginami
Sugamo-machi, Kita-Toshima-gun		Toshima		Toshima
Nishi-Sugamo-machi, Kita-Toshima-gun		Toshima		Toshima
Nagasaki-machi, Kita-Toshima-gun		Toshima		Toshima
Takada-machi, Kita-Toshima-gun		Toshima		Toshima
Takinogawa-machi, Kita-Toshima-gun		Takinogawa		Kita
Ōji-machi, Kita-Toshima-gun		Ōji		Kita
Iwabuchi-machi, Kita-Toshima-gun		Ōji		Kita
Minami-Senju-machi, Kita-Toshima-gun		Arakawa		Arakawa
Mikawashima-machi, Kita-Toshima-gun		Arakawa		Arakawa
Nippori-machi, Kita-Toshima-gun		Arakawa		Arakawa
Ogu-machi, Kita-Toshima-gun		Arakawa		Arakawa
Itabashi-machi, Kita-Toshima-gun		Itabashi		Itabashi
Kami-Itabashi-mura, Kita-Toshima-gun		Itabashi		Itabashi
Shimura-mura, Kita-Toshima-gun		Itabashi		Itabashi
Akatsuka-mura, Kita-Toshima-gun		Itabashi		Itabashi
Nerima-machi, Kita-Toshima-gun		Itabashi		Nerima
Kami-Nerima-mura, Kita-Toshima-gun		Itabashi		Nerima
Nakaarai-mura, Kita-Toshima-gun		Itabashi		Nerima
Shakujii-mura, Kita-Toshima-gun		Itabashi		Nerima
Ōizumi-mura, Kita-Toshima-gun		Itabashi		Nerima
Senju-machi, Minami-Adachi-gun		Adachi		Adachi
Umejima-machi, Minami-Adachi-gun		Adachi		Adachi
Nishiarai-machi, Minami-Adachi-gun		Adachi		Adachi
Kōhoku-mura, Minami-Adachi-gun		Adachi		Adachi
Toneri-mura, Minami-Adachi-gun		Adachi		Adachi
Ikō-mura, Minami-Adachi-gun		Adachi		Adachi
Fuchie-mura, Minami-Adachi-gun		Adachi		Adachi
Higashi-Fuchie-mura, Minami-Adachi-gun		Adachi		Adachi
Hanahata-mura, Minami-Adachi-gun		Adachi		Adachi
Ayase-mura, Minami-Adachi-gun		Adachi		Adachi
Honden-machi, Minami-Katsushika-gun		Katsushika		Katsushika
Okudo-machi, Minami-Katsushika-gun		Katsushika		Katsushika
Minami-Ayase-machi, Minami-Katsushika-gun		Katsushika		Katsushika
Kameao-mura, Minami-Katsushika-gun		Katsushika		Katsushika
Niijuku-machi, Minami-Katsushika-gun		Katsushika		Katsushika
Kanamachi-machi, Minami-Katsushika-gun		Katsushika		Katsushika
Mizumoto-mura, Minami-Katsushika-gun		Katsushika		Katsushika
Komatsugawa-machi, Minami-Katsushika-gun		Edogawa		Edogawa
Matsue-mura, Minami-Katsushika-gun		Edogawa		Edogawa
Mizue-mura, Minami-Katsushika-gun		Edogawa		Edogawa
Kasai-mura, Minami-Katsushika-gun		Edogawa		Edogawa
Shikamoto-mura, Minami-Katsushika-gun		Edogawa		Edogawa
Shinozaki-mura, Minami-Katsushika-gun		Edogawa		Edogawa
Koiwa-machi, Minami-Katsushika-gun		Edogawa		Edogawa

== See also ==
- Capital of Japan
- Politics of Tokyo City
