= Tanashi, Tokyo =

Tanashi 田無市
- Former municipality
- Flag Emblem

- Location in Japan
- Coordinates: 35°43′39″N 139°32′56″E
- Country: Japan
- Region: Kantō
- Prefecture: Tokyo Metropolis
- Merged: January 21, 2001 (now part of Nishi-Tōkyō)

Area
  - Total: 6.8 km^{2} (2.6 sq mi)

Population (January 1, 2000)
  - Total: 78,165
  - Density: 11,495/km^{2} (29,770/sq mi)
- Time zone: UTC+09:00 (JST)
- Website: https://web.archive.org/web/20000229133116/http://www.tanasi-hoya.co.jp/tanasi/index.html
- Symbols
- Flower: Tanashi Azalea
- Tree: Zelkova serrata

Tanashi (田無市, Tanashi-shi) was a city located in the western portion of Tokyo Metropolis, Japan.

== Etymology ==
Tanashi means the land without rice. Because of the area's elevation relative to the Tamagawa River, traditional irrigation and rice farming was impossible. Hence, the area was named Tanashi.

== Population ==
At the time of its merger, the city had an estimated population of 78,165 and a density of 11,495 persons per km^{2}. The total area was 6.8 km^{2}.

== History ==
The area of modern Tanashi prospered during the Edo period as a post station on the Ome Kaido and Tokorozawa Kaido, and was part of ancient Musashi Province. After the Meiji Restoration it came under the jurisdiction of the short-lived prefectures of Shinagawa (1868) and Irima (1871), before becoming part of Kanagawa in 1872. During the early Meiji period (1878) cadastral reform, it became the town of Tanashi within Kitatama District in Kanagawa. The entire district was transferred to the administrative control of Tokyo Metropolis in 1893. Tanashi was connected to central Tokyo by train from 1927. Tanashi was elevated to city status in 1967.

On January 21, 2001, Tanashi was merged with the neighboring city of Hoya to create the city of Nishi-Tōkyō, and thus Tanashi no longer exists as an independent municipality.
