= Hōya, Tokyo =

Hōya 保谷市
- Former municipality
- Flag Emblem

- Location in Japan
- Coordinates: 35°44′54″N 139°34′03″E
- Country: Japan
- Region: Kantō
- Prefecture: Tokyo Metropolis
- Merged: January 21, 2001 (now part of Nishi-Tōkyō)

Area
  - Total: 9.05 km^{2} (3.49 sq mi)

Population (September 1, 1995)
  - Total: 102,720
  - Density: 11,350/km^{2} (29,400/sq mi)
- Time zone: UTC+09:00 (JST)
- Website: https://web.archive.org/web/20000229133116/http://www.tanasi-hoya.co.jp/hoya/index.html
- Symbols
- Flower: Camellia sasanqua
- Tree: Zelkova serrata

Hōya (保谷市, Hoya-shi) was a city located in the western portion of Tokyo Metropolis, Japan.

At the time of its merger, the city had an estimated population of 102,720 and a density of 11,350 persons per km^{2}. The total area was 9.05 km^{2}.

The area of modern Hōya was an agricultural region and agricultural products transshipment center for Edo in the premodern period, and was part of ancient Musashi Province. After the Meiji Restoration it came under the jurisdiction of the short-lived prefectures of Shinagawa (1868), Irima (1871), Kumagaya (1873) and Saitama (1876).

On April 1, 1889, the villages of Kamihōya, Shimohōya, and Hōya-shinden merged to form the village of Hoya within Niikura District, then a portion of Saitama Prefecture. The district merged with Kitaadachi District in 1896, but subsequently was transferred to the administrative control of Tokyo Metropolis on April 1, 1907. Hōya was connected to central Tokyo by train from 1915. Hoya was elevated to town status in 1940, and to city status in 1967.

On January 21, 2001, Hōya was merged with the neighboring city of Tanashi to create the city of Nishi-Tōkyō, and Hōya thus no longer exists as an independent municipality.
