= Minamitama District =

Historical district in Japan

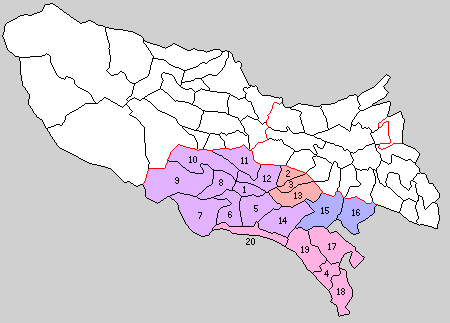
Administrative divisions in the three Western Tama counties in 1889, Minamitama in colours: 1. is the county seat, the town of Hachiōji. 2. to 20. represent the 19 villages.; Different colours indicate present-day municipalities: purple – Hachiōji-shi, red – Machida-shi, orange – Hino-shi, blue – Tama (15.) and Inagi (16.) exist without merger since 1889.

Minamitama (南多摩郡, Minamitama-gun, South Tama) was a district or county (gun) of Tokyo (Metropolis/Prefecture), Japan. It was created in the early Meiji era when the old Tama District of Musashi Province was divided into four parts and split between Kanagawa and Tokyo. It lost its status as an administrative unit in the 1920s when county governments and councils were abolished across the country. As a geographical unit, it ceased to exist in 1971 when its last two remaining municipalities were promoted to independent cities.

== History ==
- Minamitama District was created in 1878 and initially consisted of more than 120 subdivisions.
- When the modern municipality system was set up in 1889, Miniamitama District consisted of one town (the county seat of Hachiōji) and 19 villages.
- In 1893, Minamitama District was transferred from Kanagawa Prefecture to Tokyo Prefecture; alongside Nishitama (West Tama) and Kitatama (North Tama) Districts. Higashitama (East Tama) District had been part of Tokyo since its creation. Several villages within Minamitama were promoted to towns over the decades.
- The first loss of territory came in 1917 when Hachiōji was elevated city status (becoming the second city in Tokyo Prefecture after Tokyo City).
- In 1941, Komiyama was merged into Hachiōji followed by another six municipalities in 1955.
- In 1958, Machida Town absorbed three villages to become Machida City.
- In 1963, Hino Town was elevated to city status after previously merging with other villages.
- In 1964, the merger of the village of Yugi into Hachiōji left Minamitama District with only two remaining municipalities: the towns of Tama and Inagi. Both were elevated to city status on November 1, 1971.

== Electoral district ==
An electoral district for the Tokyo Metropolitan Assembly is named Minamitama to the day. As of 2013, it still consists of the cities of Tama and Inagi and sends two members to the prefectural legislature. Inagi is also the last municipality in mainland Tokyo that maintains its own municipal fire department, Tama gave up its own fire department in 1975 and transferred the responsibility for fire protection to the Tokyo Fire Department.
