= Kitatama District =

Historical district in Japan

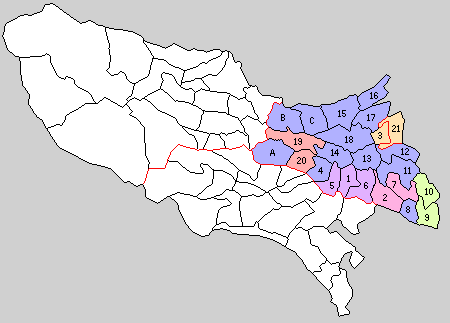
Kitatama District and its towns and villages within the former Tama District in the Meiji era: 1. Fuchū town (county seat); 2. Chōfu town; 3. Tanashi town; 4. Yaho village; 5. Nishifu village; 6. Tama village; 7. Jindai village; 8. Komae village; 9. Kinuta village; 10. Chitose village; 11. Mitaka village; 12. Musashino village; 13. Koganei village; 14. Kokubinji village; 15. Higashimurayama village; 16. Kiyose village; 17. Kurume village; 18. Kodaira village; 19. Sunagawa village; 20. Tachikawa village; 21. Hōya village; The following are administrative confederations of municipalities (chōson kumiai, lit. "town and village unions"; compare collective municipalities or municipal associations): 1. Nakagami & eight other villages; 2. Nakatō & three other villages; 3. Takagi & five other villages

Kitatama (北多摩郡, Kita-Tama-gun, North Tama) was a district located in the Japanese Prefecture of Kanagawa from 1878 to 1893 and then in the Prefecture of Tokyo until 1970.

In 1878, the Meiji government made the first step to introduce modern administrative divisions on the municipal level: The districts (gun) were created from the pre-modern districts (gun or kōri) with their towns and villages. The old Tama District of Musashi Province was divided into four parts: Eastern Tama (Higashitama) became part of Tokyo Prefecture and the three other districts of Northern Tama (Kitatama), Southern Tama (Minamitama) and Western Tama (Nishitama) part of Kanagawa Prefecture.

In 1889 when the modern cities, towns and villages were incorporated, the communities of Northern Tama were organized into 39 municipalities: the town (initially -eki, became machi in 1893) of Fuchū where the district government was set up, the towns of Chōfu and Tanashi and 37 villages. Four years later, in 1893, the three Western Tama districts were transferred from Kanagawa to Tokyo. In the 1920s the district government was, like all in the country, dissolved and Kitatama District became mostly a geographical name though it is still used for certain administrative purposes – for example, four electoral districts for the prefectural parliament still bear the name Kitatama and follow the former district borders.

In the 1930s and 1940s many villages in the district were elevated to towns, and beginning in 1936 when Kinuta and Chitose (in the present-day special ward of Setagaya) were integrated into Tokyo city the district started to lose territory. In 1940, Tachikawa became a city and after World War II, large parts of the district followed when the cities of Musashino, Mitaka, Chōfu, Koganei, Fuchū, Kokubunji, Akishima, Kodaira and Higashimurayama were created. By 1967, Kitatama District only consisted of five towns and it ceased to exist in 1970 when the remaining area was consolidated into the cities of Komae, Kiyose, Higashikurume, Higashimurayama and Musashimurayama.
