= Western Metropolitan Area University Association =

The Western Metropolitan Area University Association (Japanese: 首都圏西部大学単位互換協定会) is a Japanese association for higher education, with members located primarily in western part of Tokyo Metropolitan Area. The current leading institute is Kokushikan University. Students at the member schools can cross-register for credits toward their own school's degrees without any additional fees. The association has created a substantial number of research and educational collaborations, including e-learning training program.

== Membership ==
- Azabu University
- Kokushikan University
- Sagami Women's University
- Kitasato University
- Joshibi University of Art and Design
- Obirin University
- Tamagawa University
- Tokyo Jogakkan College
- Kanagawa Institute of Technology
- Shoin University
- Tokyo University of Agriculture
- Showa University of Music
- Tokyo Polytechnic University
- Sanno University
- Den-en Chofu University
- Kokugakuin University
- Toyo Eiwa University
- Kamakura Women's University
- Takachiho University
- Shohoku College
- Izumi Junior College
- Yokohama College of Art and Design
- Yamazaki College of Animal Health Technology
- Tokyo Jogakkan College
- Yamano College of Aesthetics
