= Aikō-Ishida Station =

Railway station in Atsugi, Kanagawa Prefecture, Japan

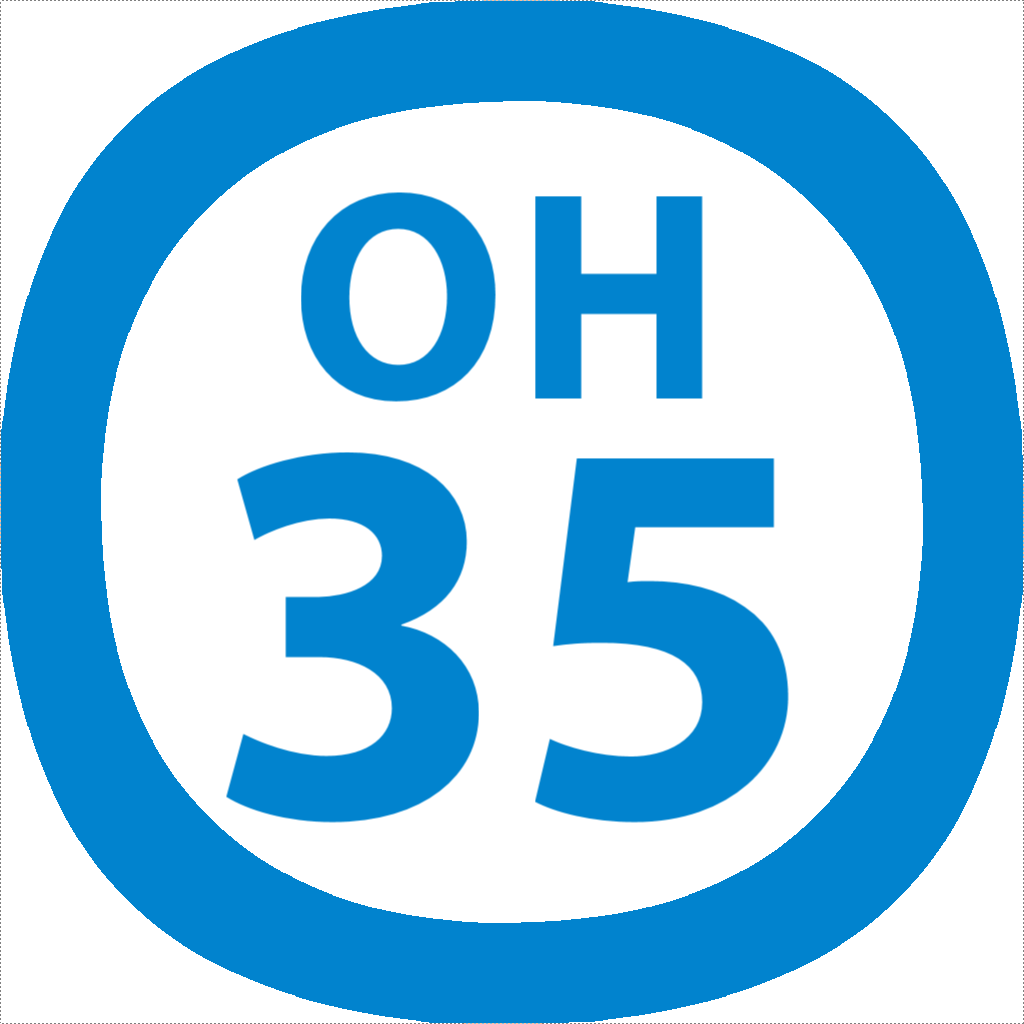
Aikō-Ishida Station 愛甲石田駅

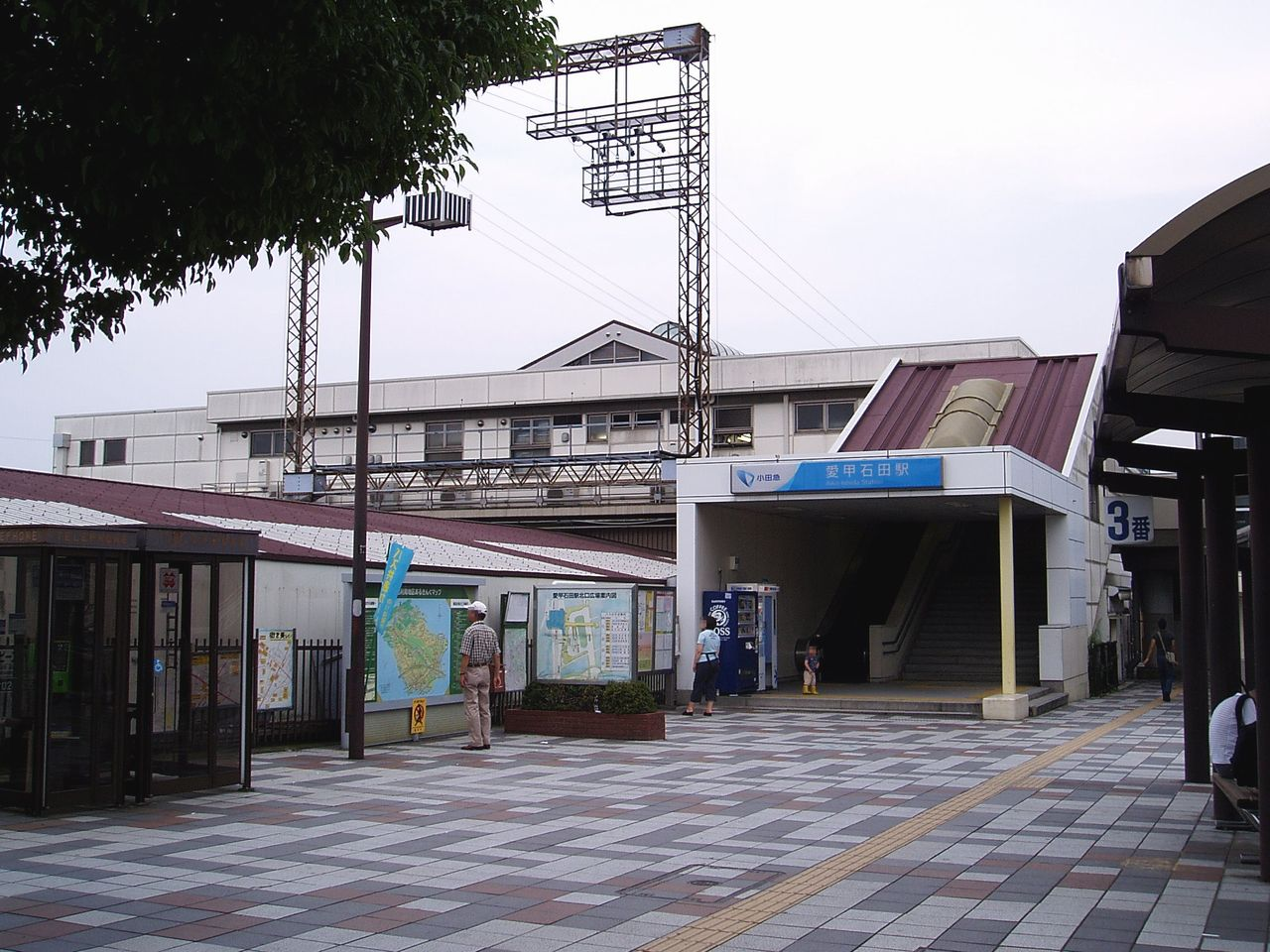
- North Exit of Aikō-Ishida Station, 2008

General information
- Location: 1-1-1 Aikō, Atsugi-shi, Kanagawa-ken 243-0035; Japan
- Coordinates: 35.417844°N 139.344083°E
- Operator: Odakyu Electric Railway
- Line: ■ Odakyu Odawara Line
- Distance: 48.5 km from Shinjuku
- Platforms: 2 side platforms
- Connections: Bus terminal

Other information
- Status: Staffed
- Station code: OH-35
- Website: Official website

History
- Opened: 1 April 1927; 99 years ago

Passengers
- FY2019: 54,602 daily

Services
Preceding station	Odakyu	Following station
Isehara towards Odawara	Odawara Line Rapid Express	Hon-Atsugi towards Shinjuku
Isehara towards Odawara	Odawara Line Express	Hon-Atsugi towards Shinjuku or Yoyogi-Uehara
Isehara One-way operation	Odawara Line Commuter Semi Express	Hon-Atsugi towards Yoyogi-Uehara
Isehara towards Odawara	Odawara Line Local	Hon-Atsugi towards Shinjuku or Yoyogi-Uehara
Location
- Location within Kanagawa Prefecture Location within Japan

Aikō-Ishida Station (愛甲石田駅, Aikō-Ishida-eki) is a passenger railway station located in the city of Atsugi, Kanagawa Prefecture, Japan. The station operated by the private railway operator Odakyu Electric Railway. Part of the station physically extends into neighboring Isehara city.

== Lines ==
Aikō-Ishida Station is served by the Odakyu Odawara Line, and lies 48.5 rail kilometers from the line's terminal at Shinjuku Station.

== Station layout ==
The station has two opposed side platforms, with the station building is constructed on a cantilever above the platforms and tracks.

=== Platforms ===
1	■ Odakyu Odawara Line	For Shin-Matsuda and Odawara
2	■ Odakyu Odawara Line	For Sagami-Ono, Shin-Yurigaoka, Chiyoda line Ayase and Shinjuku

== History ==
Aikō-Ishida Station was opened on April 1, 1927, on the Odakyu Odawara Line of the Odakyu Electric Railway with normal and 6-car limited express services. A limited number of Romancecar express trains began serving the station from 1987, the same year that the new station building was completed.

The station was named after Aikō, Atsugi and adjacent Ishida, Isehara.

Station numbering was introduced in January 2014 with Aikō-Ishida being assigned station number OH35.

== Passenger statistics ==
In fiscal 2019, the station was used by an average of 54,602 passengers daily.

The passenger figures for previous years are as shown below.

Fiscal year	daily average
2005	45,686
2010	47,460
2015	51,341

== Surrounding area ==
- Japan National Route 246
- Nissan Motor Technical Center
- Odawara Atsugi Road (Japan National Route 271)
- Kanagawa Prefectural Ishida High School
- Kanagawa Prefectural Isehara School for the Disabled
- Amada Co

== Bus connections ==
- There is a bus to Shoin University which takes 15 minutes during off-peak traffic.

== See also ==
- List of railway stations in Japan
