= Masaya Notomi =

Masaya Notomi of the NTT Basic Research Laboratories, Atsugi, Japan was named Fellow of the Institute of Electrical and Electronics Engineers (IEEE) in 2013 for leadership in the development of photonic crystals and applications.
