= Mount Ōyama (Kanagawa) =

Mountain in Japan

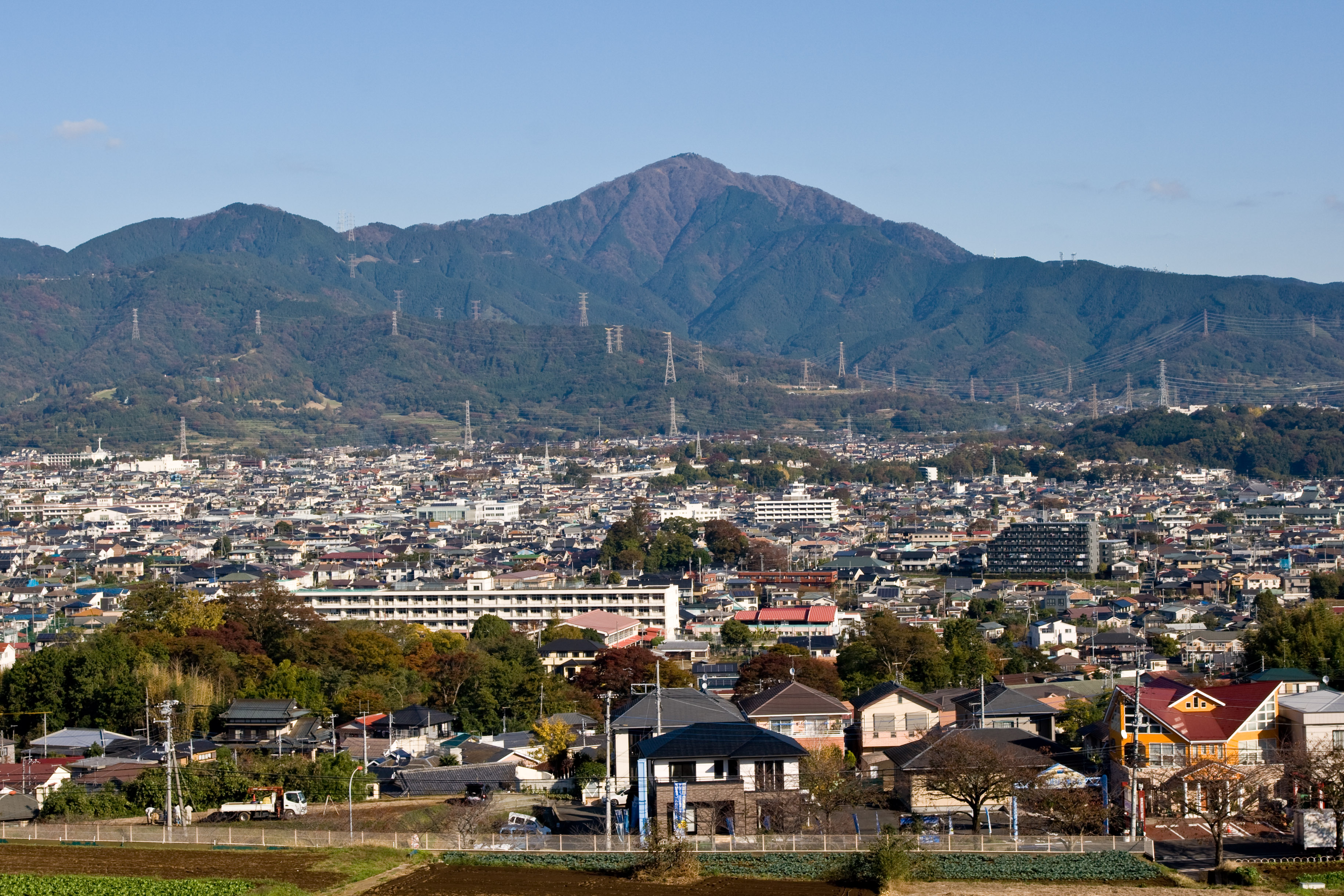
- View from the south

Highest point
- Elevation: 1,252 m (4,108 ft)
- Listing: List of mountains in Japan
- Coordinates: 35°26′27″N 139°13′52″E

Naming
- English translation: big mountain rain mountain guardian of the land mountain
- Language of name: Japanese
- Pronunciation: [oːjama] [aɸɯɾijama] [kɯɲimijama]

Geography
- Location within Japan
- Location: Kanagawa Prefecture, Japan
- Parent range: Tanzawa Mountains
- Topo map(s): Geographical Survey Institute 25000:1 大山; 50000:1 東京

Geology
- Rock age: Middle Miocene–Late Miocene
- Mountain type: Volcanic
- Volcanic arc: Izu–Bonin–Mariana Arc

Climbing
- Easiest route: Hike

Mount Ōyama (大山, Ō-yama), also Mount Afuri (阿夫利山 or 雨降り山, Afuri-yama) or Mount Kunimi (Kunimi-yama), is a 1,252-metre-high (4,108 ft) mountain situated on the border of Isehara, Hadano and Atsugi in Kanagawa Prefecture, Japan. Together with Mount Tanzawa and other mountains in the Tanzawa Mountains it forms the Tanzawa-Ōyama Quasi-National Park. Mount Ōyama is a popular sightseeing spot in Kanagawa Prefecture.

== Geology ==
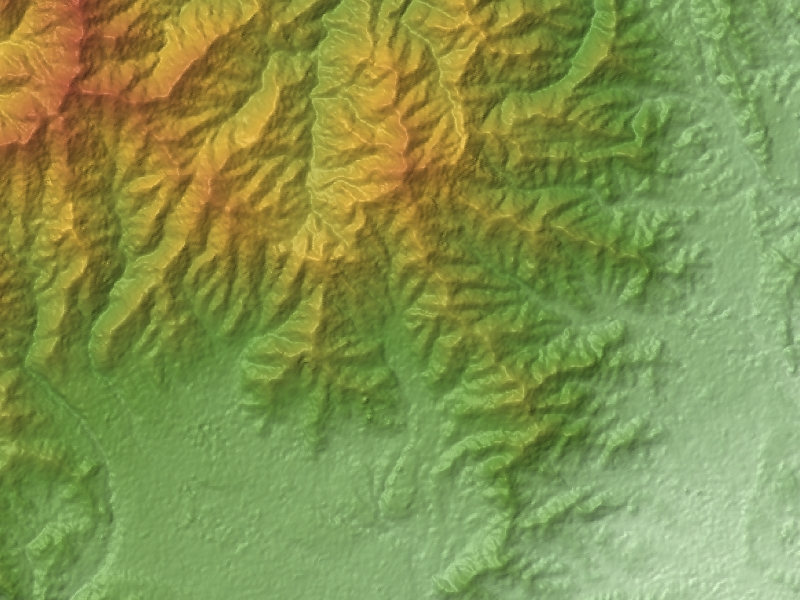
Relief map of Mount Ōyama (center)

The mountain is made from non-alkali mafic rock. The rock is 7-15 million years old. The rock was extruded on the sea floor during the Neogene and then pushed up and onto the island of Honshu when the Izu–Bonin–Mariana Arc collided with the rest of Japan.

== Holy mountain ==
Mount Ōyama has long been regarded as a holy mountain and object of worship. Religiously motivated mountain climbing has been practiced since the Hōreki era (1751–1764) and the various paths leading there were called Ōyama Kaidō (大山街道, Ōyama Kaidō). Today this name survives as the pseudonym of Route 246.

At the top of the mountain is the head office of the Ōyama-Afuri Shrine (大山阿夫利神社, Ō-yama-afuri Jinja). Lower down the mountain is the lower shrine and the Ōyama-dera (大山寺). Afuri refers to the high amount of rain and clouds associated with the mountain. Farmers pray at Ōyama-Afuri Shrine to Suijin, god of rain.

The mountain is also known as the Guardian of the Land (Kunimi-yama).

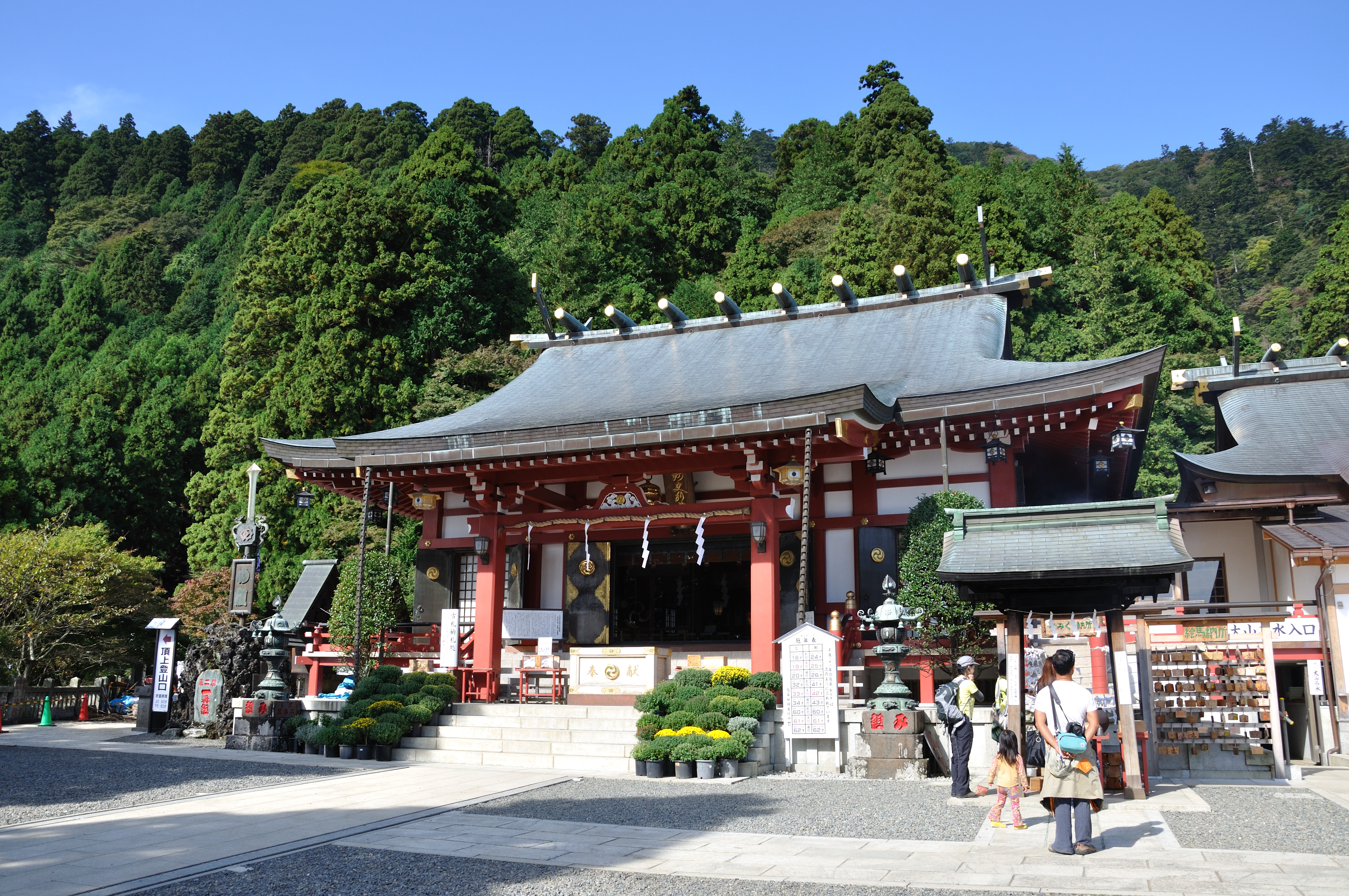
Ōyama-Afuri Shrine
(大山阿夫利神社)

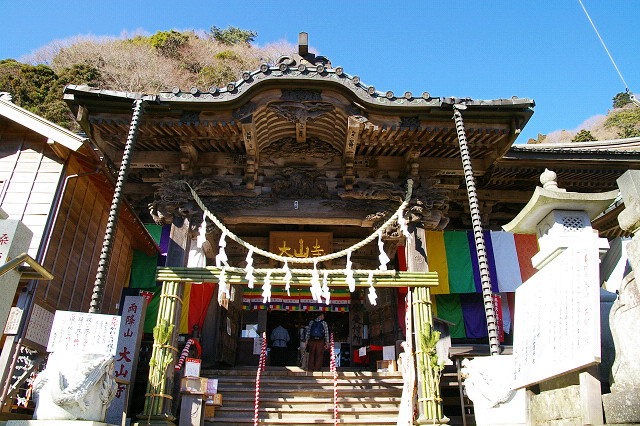
Ōyama-dera temple
(大山寺)

== Sightseeing ==
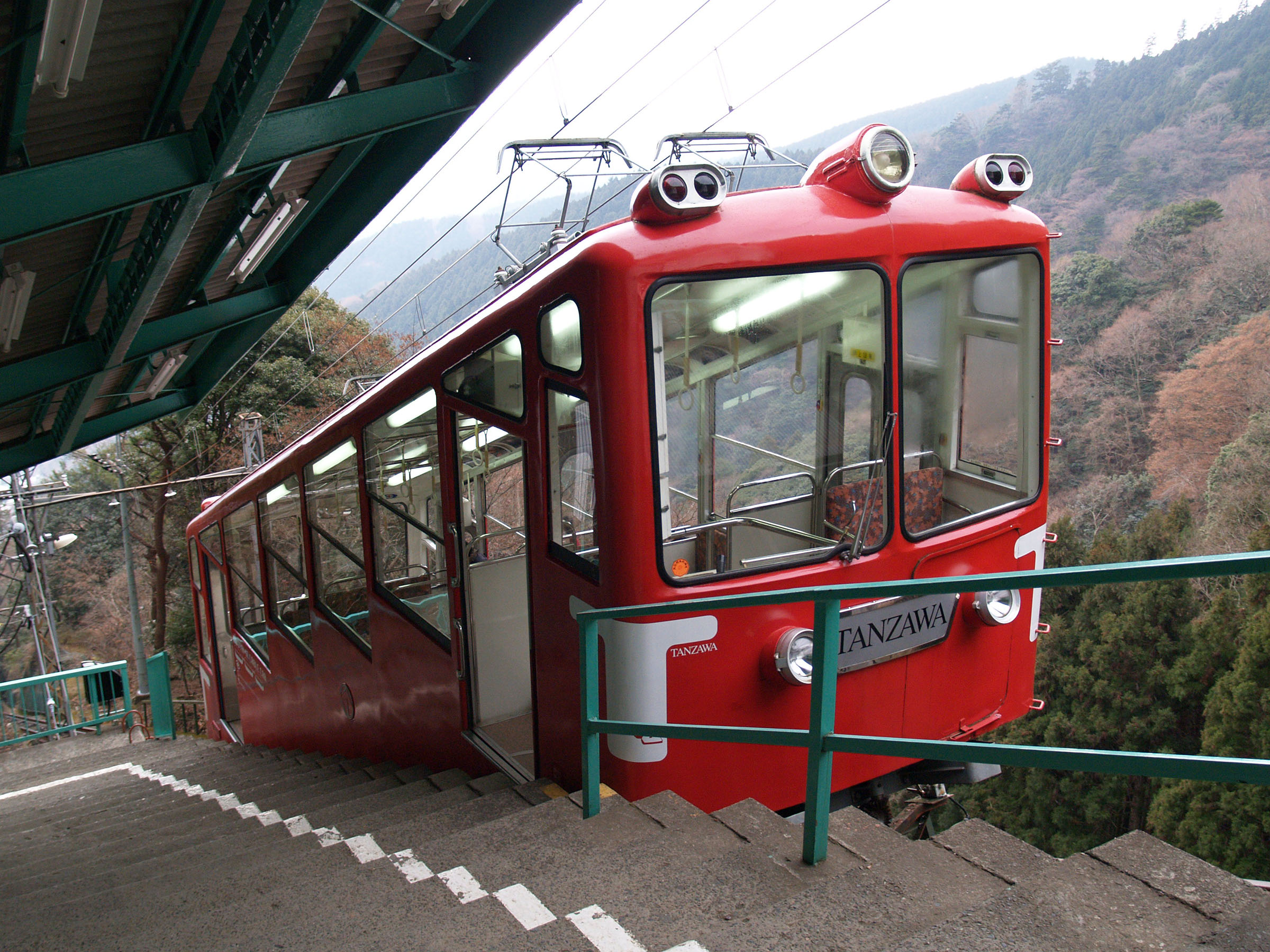
Ōyama Cable Car

A bus connects Isehara Station on the Odakyu Odawara Line with the cable car station at the foot of the mountain. A narrow road runs directly between the town areas and the cable car station. The cable car starts from next to Ōyama-dera and climbs to the top station. The top station is not far from the lower Afuri Shrine. Hiking from there it takes about 1.5 hours to climb to the top of the mountain.

Tofu and spinning tops are well-known local products. The Ōyama Tofu Festival takes place every March. The Ōyama Mountain Climbing Marathon also takes place in March between Isehara Station and the lower shrine. The course is over 9 kilometres (5.6 mi) long and includes an altitude difference of over 650 metres (2,130 ft). Possible access points for an ascent are the cable car terminus, the temple Hinatayakushi (日向薬師, hinatayakushi) in Isehara, Minoge (蓑毛, minoge) and the Yabitsu ridge (ヤビツ峠, yabitsu-tōge) in Hadano.

== Photo gallery ==
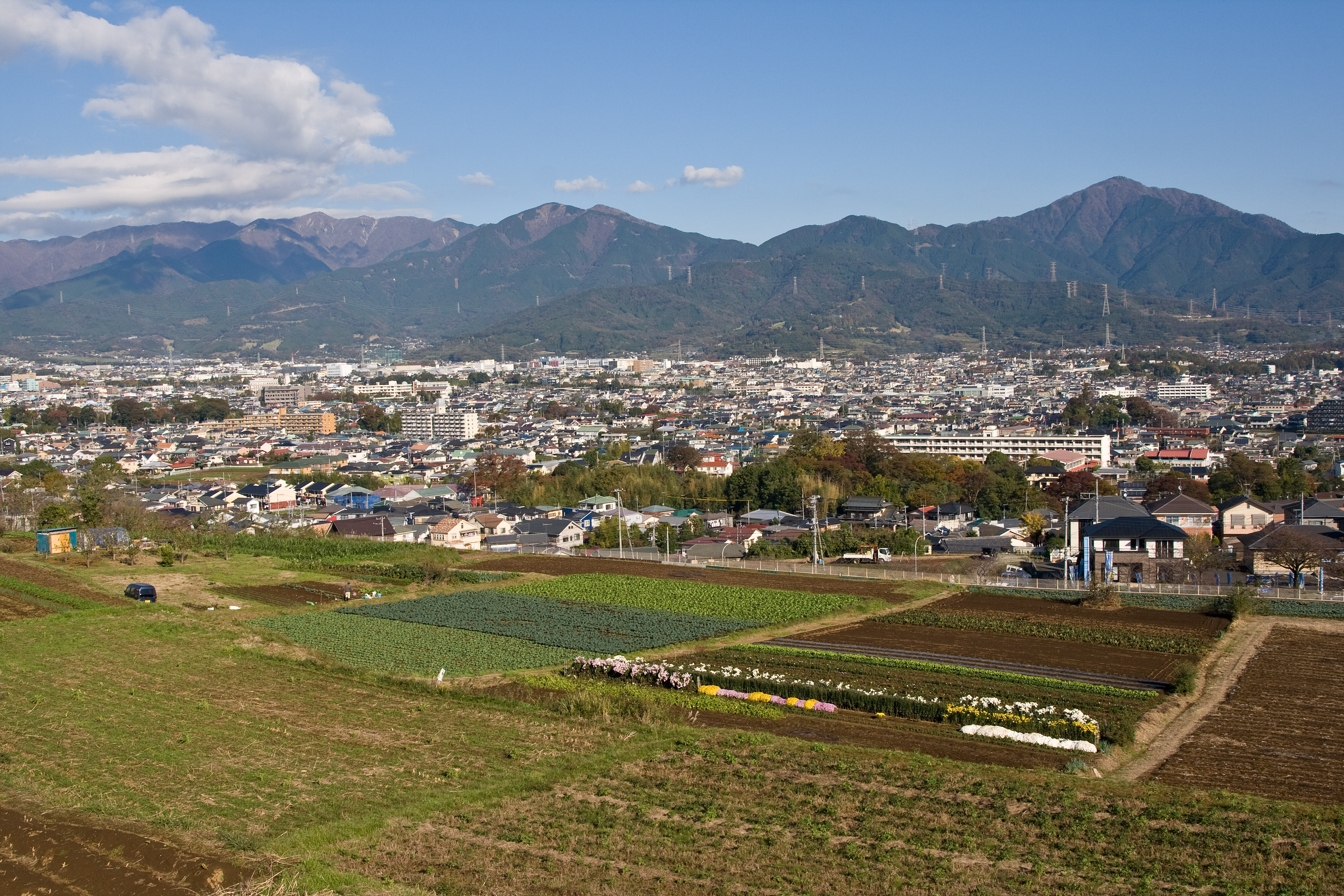
With Tanzawa Mountains

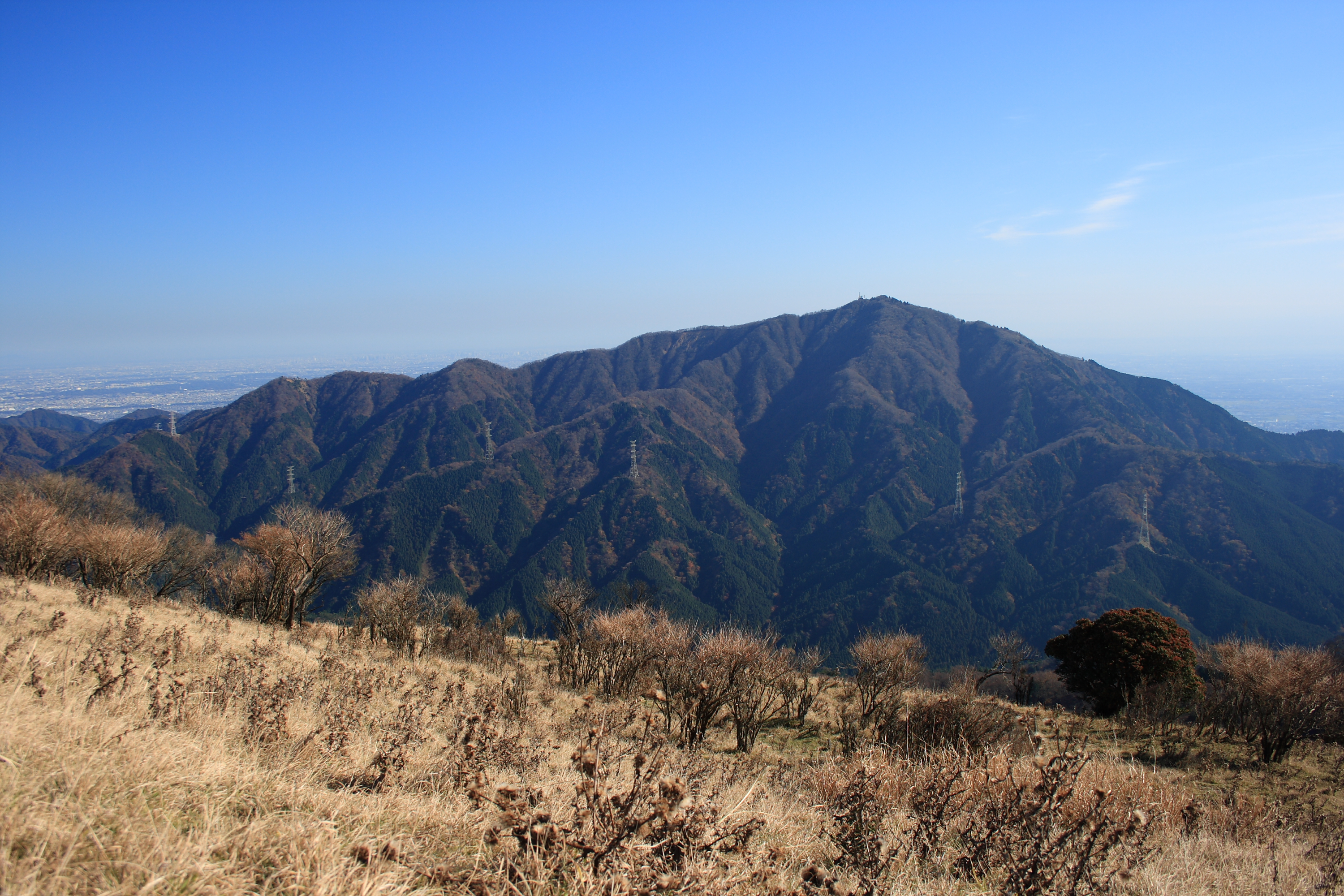
From the west (from Mt. Sannoto, Tanzawa Mountains)

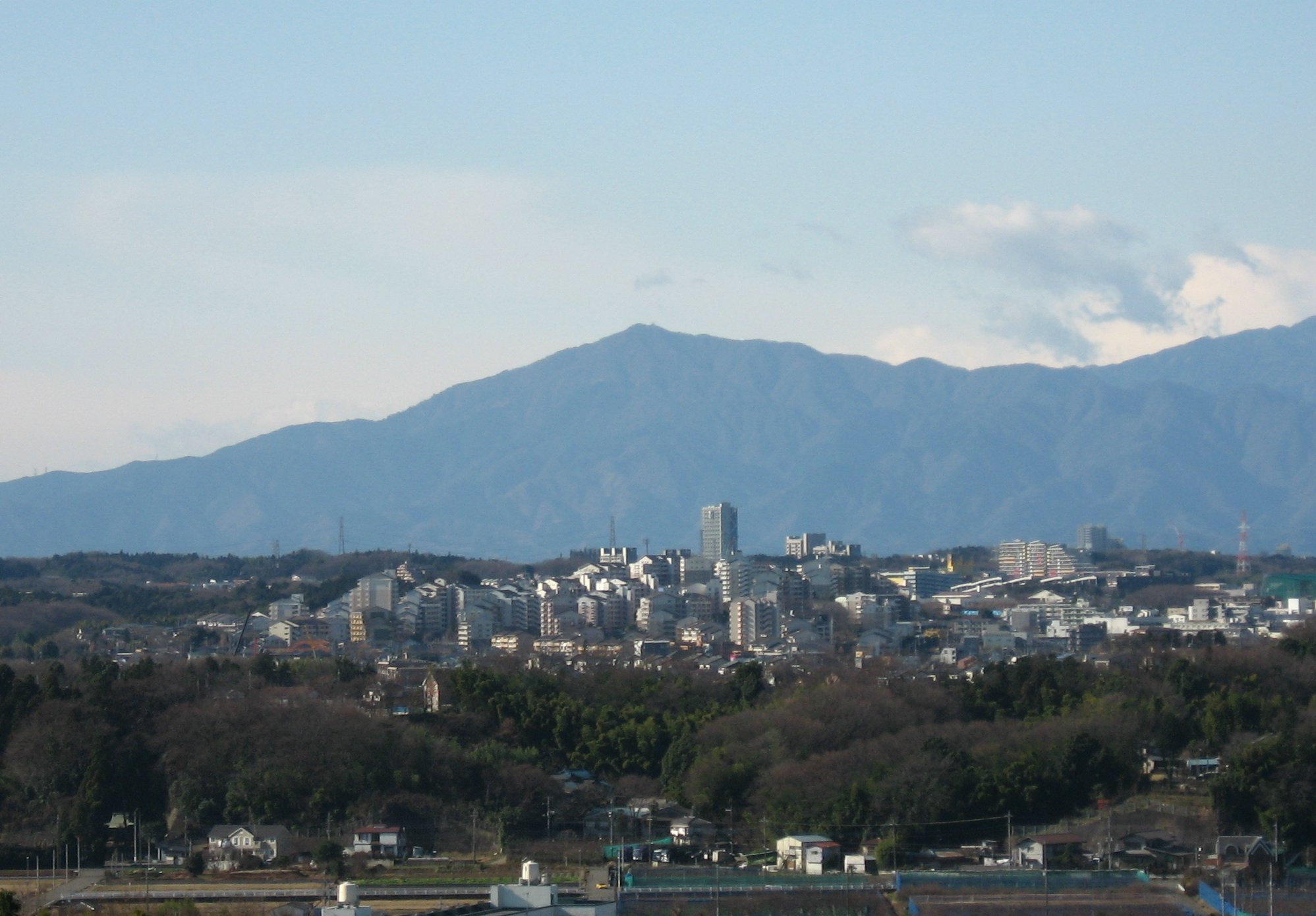
From the east (from Tsuzuki, Yokohama)

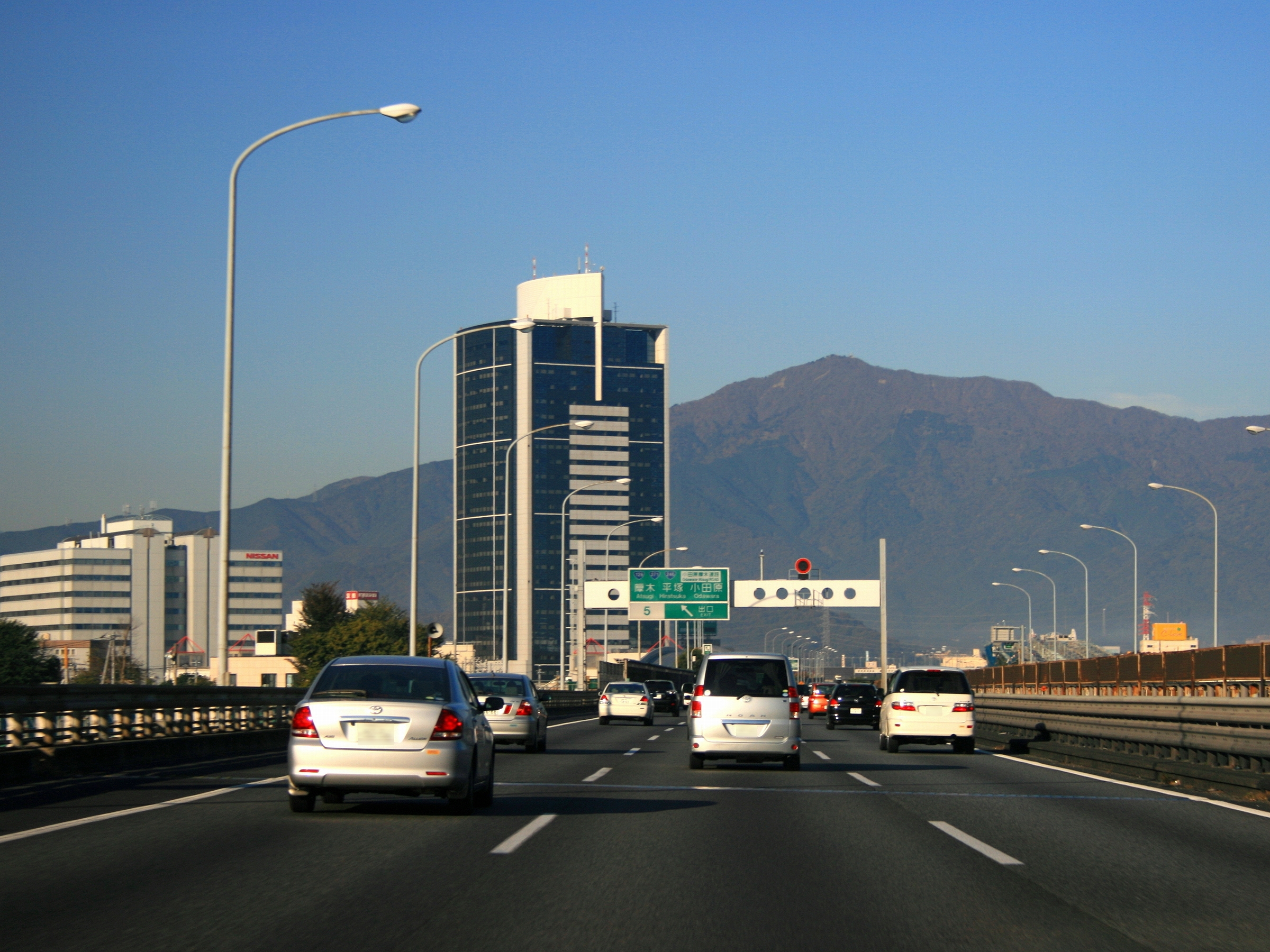
With Tomei Expressway
