= Shoin Junior and Senior High School =

Coordinates: 35°39′47″N 139°40′30″E

- 松蔭中学校・高等学校 (東京都)
- Setagaya, Tokyo; Japan

Information
- Type: Private Senior and Junior Co-educational
- Established: 1941
- Website: www.shoin.ed.jp/top.html

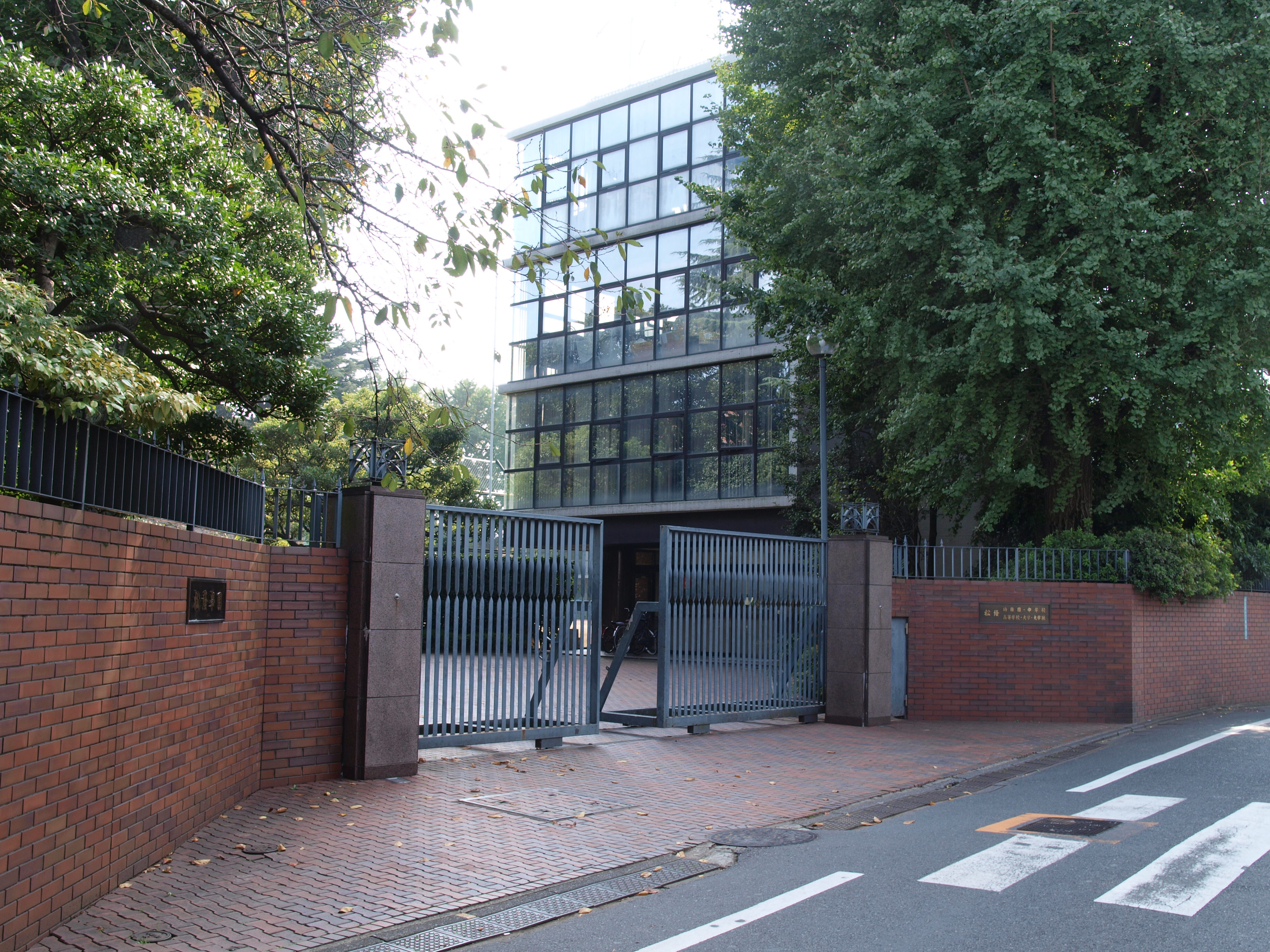

Shoin Junior and Senior High School (Tokyo) (松蔭中学校・高等学校 (東京都), Shōin Chūgakkō Kōtō Gakkō) is a Japanese high school located in the Setagaya ward of Tokyo. It is affiliated with Shoin University. The predecessor of the school, a women's school, was founded in 1941. It was chartered as a Junior and Senior High School in 1947, and become coeducational in 2005.

== History ==
- 1941: Shoin Women's School was established.
- 1947: Shoin Junior High School was chartered by the Ministry of Education (now, Ministry of Education, Culture, Sports, Science and Technology).
- 1948: Shoin High School was chartered by the Ministry of Education.
- 1948: Shoin Kindergarten (coeducational) was chartered by the Ministry of Education.
- 2005: Shoin Junior and High School became coeducational.
- 2008: Foreign language education program was introduced.

== Notable alumni ==
- Tomomi Kahala, singer
- Yumi Maruyama, former volleyball player

== See also ==
- List of high schools in Tokyo
