= Naka District, Kanagawa =

District in Kanagawa Prefecture, Japan

Coordinates: 35°18′41″N 139°16′26″E

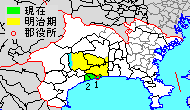
Map of Naka District with Meiji period area in yellow, modern area in green: 1. - Ōiso, 2. - Ninomiya

Naka District (中郡, Naka-gun) is a district located in central Kanagawa Prefecture, Japan. It currently consists of two towns, Ōiso, and Ninomiya. The majority of the area of the city of Hadano and the entire cities of Hiratsuka and Isehara were formerly part of Naka District.

As of 2009, the district had an estimated population of 62,522 and a density of 2,380 persons per km^{2}. The total area was 26.26 km^{2}.

== Towns and villages ==
- Ninomiya
- Ōiso

== History ==
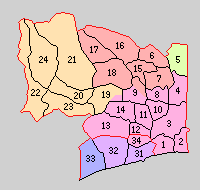
Historic map of Naka District

Naka District was one of the four subdivisions of Sagami Province established by the later Hōjō clan of Odawara during the Sengoku period. In the Edo period, it was nominally part of Odawara Domain, although large portions were tenryō territory controlled by the shōgun in Edo through various hatamoto.

=== Timeline ===
After the Meiji Restoration and with the establishment of the district system in 1878, the territory came under the control of Ōsumi District (大住郡, Ōsumi-gun) and Yurugi District (淘綾郡, Yurugi-gun). On March 26, 1896, these two districts were joined to form the modern Naka District, which initially consisted of five towns and 23 villages. Hiratsuka was elevated to city status in 1932, followed by Hadano in 1955 and Isehara in 1971.

=== Merger table ===
before 1889	April 1, 1889	1889–1926	1926–1944			1945–1954		1955–1989		1989–Present	Present
Ashigarakami District	Ashigarakami; Kamihadano village	Ashigarakami District; Kamihadano village	Ashigarakami District; Kamihadano village			Ashigarakami District; Kamihadano village		July 28, 1955; Nishihadano town	January 1, 1963 merged into Hadano city	Hadano city	Hadano
Ōsumi District	Nishihadano village	Nishihadano village	Nishihadano village			Nishihadano village		July 28, 1955; Nishihadano town	January 1, 1963 merged into Hadano city	Hadano city	Hadano
Ōsumi District	Hadano town	Hadano town	Hadano town			Hadano town		January 1, 1955; Hadano city		Hadano city	Hadano
Ōsumi District	Kitahadano village	Kitahadano village	Kitahadano village			Kitahadano village		January 1, 1955; Hadano city		Hadano city	Hadano
Ōsumi District	Higashihadano village	Higashihadano village	Higashihadano village			Higashihadano village		January 1, 1955; Hadano city		Hadano city	Hadano
Ōsumi District	Minamihadano village	Minamihadano village	June 1, 1940; Minamihadano town			Minamihadano town		January 1, 1955; Hadano city		Hadano city	Hadano
Ōsumi District	Ōne town	Ōne town	Ōne town			Ōne town		April 15, 1955 merged with Hadano city (except Sanada area)		Hadano city	Hadano
Ōsumi District	Ōne town	Ōne town	Ōne town			Ōne town		March 2, 1955 merged with Kaneda village (Sanada area)	October 1, 1957 merged into Hiratsuka city	Hiratsuka city	Hiratsuka
Ōsumi District	Kaname village	Kaname village	Kaname village			Kaname village		Kaname village	October 1, 1957 merged into Hiratsuka city	Hiratsuka city	Hiratsuka
Ōsumi District	Hiratsuka town	Hiratsuka town	Hiratsuka town		April 1, 1932; Hiratsuka city	Hiratsuka city		Hiratsuka city		Hiratsuka city	Hiratsuka
Ōsumi District	Suma village	Suma village	January 1, 1927; Suma town	April 1, 1929 merged into Hiratsuka town	April 1, 1932; Hiratsuka city	Hiratsuka city		Hiratsuka city		Hiratsuka city	Hiratsuka
Ōsumi District	Konaka village	April 1, 1909; Asahi village	Asahi village			July 15, 1954 merged into Hiratsuka city		Hiratsuka city		Hiratsuka city	Hiratsuka
Yurugi District	Yamashiro village	April 1, 1909; Asahi village	Asahi village			July 15, 1954 merged into Hiratsuka city		Hiratsuka city		Hiratsuka city	Hiratsuka
Ōsumi District	Ōno village	Ōno village	February 11, 1944; Ōno town			Ōno town		Ōno town	September 30, 1956 merged into Hiratsuka city	Hiratsuka city	Hiratsuka
Ōsumi District	Toyoda village	Toyoda village	Toyoda village			Toyoda village		April 1, 1956 merged into Ōno town	September 30, 1956 merged into Hiratsuka city	Hiratsuka city	Hiratsuka
Ōsumi District	Kanda village	Kanda village	Kanda village			Kanda village		September 30, 1956 merged into Hiratsuka city		Hiratsuka city	Hiratsuka
Ōsumi District	Jōjima village	Jōjima village	Jōjima village			Jōjima village		September 30, 1956 merged into Hiratsuka city		Hiratsuka city	Hiratsuka
Ōsumi District	Kaneda village	Kaneda village	Kaneda village			Kaneda village		September 30, 1956 merged into Hiratsuka city		Hiratsuka city	Hiratsuka
Ōsumi District	Tsuchizawa village	Tsuchizawa village	Tsuchizawa village			Tsuchizawa village		September 30, 1956 merged into Hiratsuka city		Hiratsuka city	Hiratsuka
Ōsumi District	Okazaki village	Okazaki village	Okazaki village			Okazaki village		September 30, 1956 merged into Hiratsuka city (except Mawatari・Ōku areas)		Hiratsuka city	Hiratsuka
Ōsumi District	Okazaki village	Okazaki village	Okazaki village			Okazaki village		September 30, 1956 merged into Isehara city (Mawatari・Ōku areas)	March 1, 1971; Isehara city	Isehara city	Isehara
Ōsumi District	Isehara town	Isehara town	Isehara town			December 1, 1954; Isehara town		Isehara town	March 1, 1971; Isehara city	Isehara city	Isehara
Ōsumi District	Naruse village	Naruse village	Naruse village			December 1, 1954; Isehara town		Isehara town	March 1, 1971; Isehara city	Isehara city	Isehara
Ōsumi District	Ōta village	Ōta village	Ōta village			December 1, 1954; Isehara town		Isehara town	March 1, 1971; Isehara city	Isehara city	Isehara
Ōsumi District	Takabeya village	Takabeya village	Takabeya village			December 1, 1954; Isehara town		Isehara town	March 1, 1971; Isehara city	Isehara city	Isehara
Ōsumi District	Ōyama town	Ōyama town	Ōyama town			December 1, 1954; Isehara town		Isehara town	March 1, 1971; Isehara city	Isehara city	Isehara
Ōsumi District	Hibita village	Hibita village	Hibita village			December 1, 1954; Isehara town		Isehara town	March 1, 1971; Isehara city	Isehara city	Isehara
Ōsumi District	Aikawa village	Aikawa village	Aikawa village			Aikawa village		July 8, 1955 merged into Atsugi city		Atsugi city	Atsugi
Yurugi District	Ōiso town	Ōiso town	Ōiso town			Ōiso town	December 1, 1954; Ōiso town	Ōiso town		Ōiso town	Ōiso
Yurugi District	Kokufu village	Kokufu village	Kokufu village			April 1, 1952; Kokufu town	December 1, 1954; Ōiso town	Ōiso town		Ōiso town	Ōiso
Yurugi District	Azuma village	Azuma village	November 3, 1935; Ninomiya town			Ninomiya town		Ninomiya town		Ninomiya town	Ninomiya
