= Hon-Atsugi Station =

Railway station in Atsugi, Kanagawa Prefecture, Japan

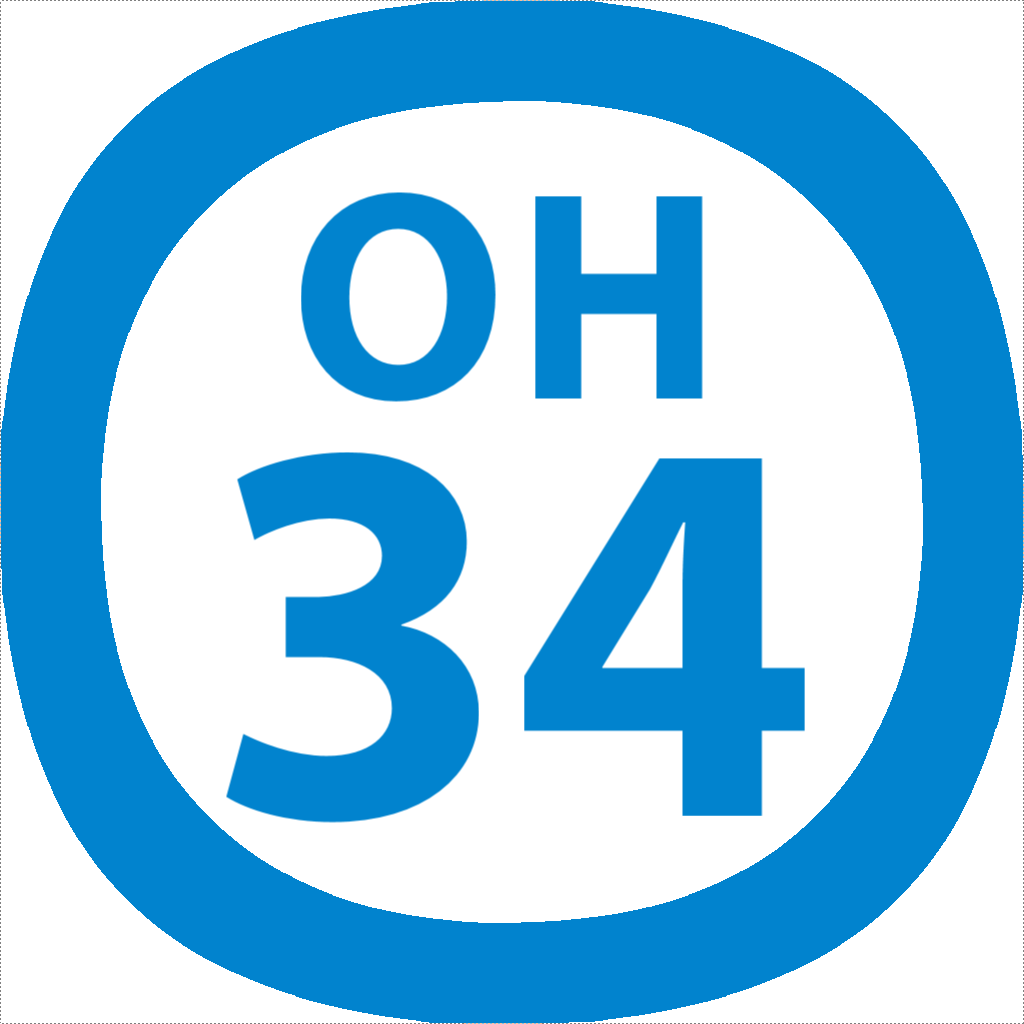
Hon-Atsugi Station 本厚木駅

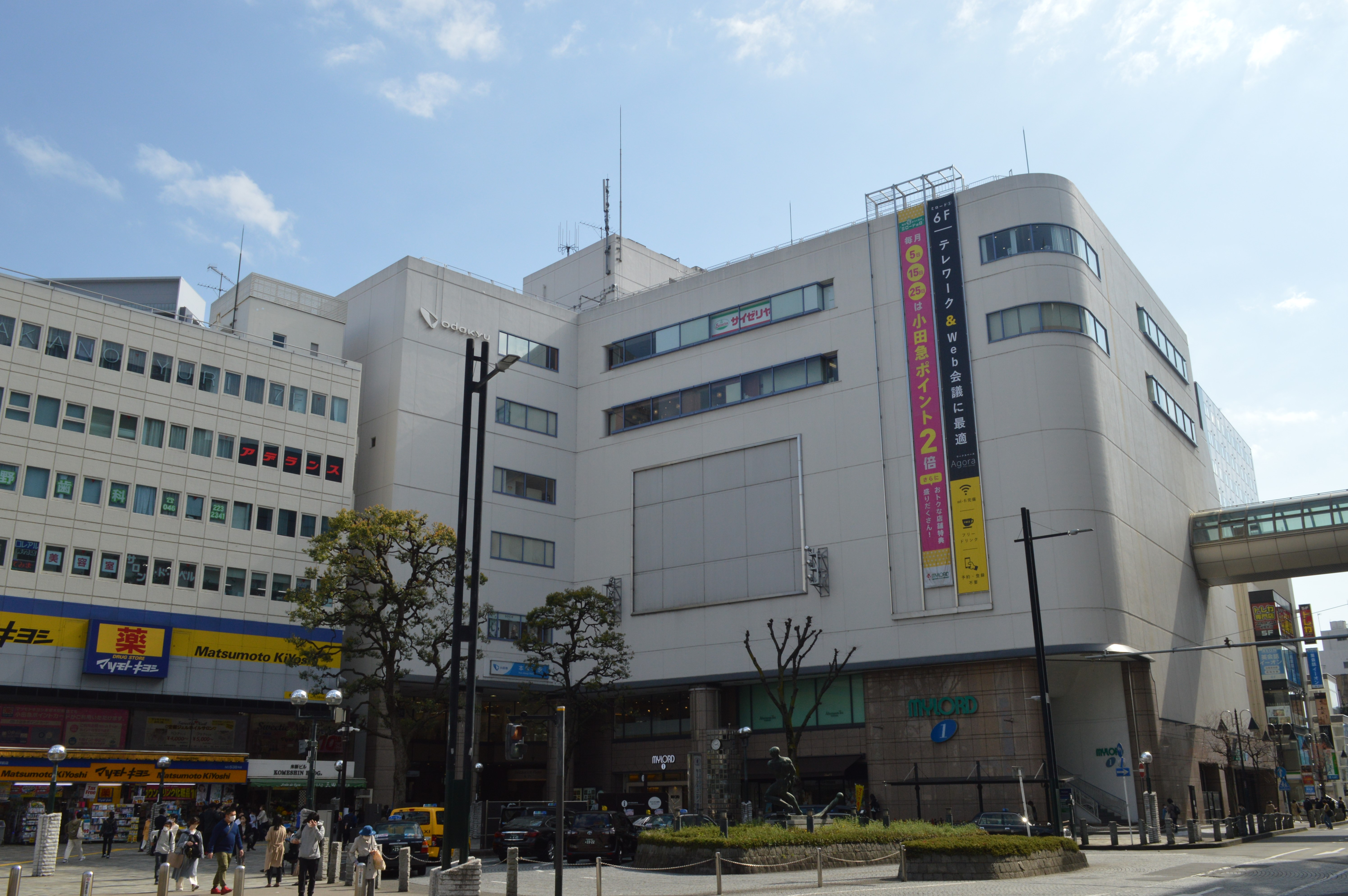
- North Exit of Hon-Atsugi Station

General information
- Location: 1 Izumicho, Atsugi-shi, Kanagawa-ken 243-0013; Japan
- Coordinates: 35.439338°N 139.364261°E
- Operator: Odakyu Electric Railway
- Line: Odakyu Odawara Line
- Distance: 45.5 km from Shinjuku
- Platforms: 2 island platforms
- Connections: Bus terminal

Other information
- Status: Staffed
- Station code: OH-34
- Website: Official website

History
- Opened: 1 April 1927; 99 years ago
- Former names: Sagami-Atsugi (until 1944)

Passengers
- FY2019: 151,791 daily

Services
Preceding station	Odakyu	Following station
Isehara towards Hakone-Yumoto or Gotemba	Romancecar	Ebina towards Shinjuku or Kita-Senju
Aikō-Ishida towards Odawara	Odawara Line Rapid Express	Ebina towards Shinjuku
Aikō-Ishida towards Odawara	Odawara Line Express	Ebina towards Shinjuku or Yoyogi-Uehara
Aikō-Ishida One-way operation	Odawara Line Commuter Semi Express	Atsugi towards Yoyogi-Uehara
Terminus	Odawara Line Semi Express	Atsugi towards Yoyogi-Uehara
Aikō-Ishida towards Odawara	Odawara Line Local	Atsugi towards Shinjuku or Yoyogi-Uehara
Location
- Location within Kanagawa Prefecture Location within Japan

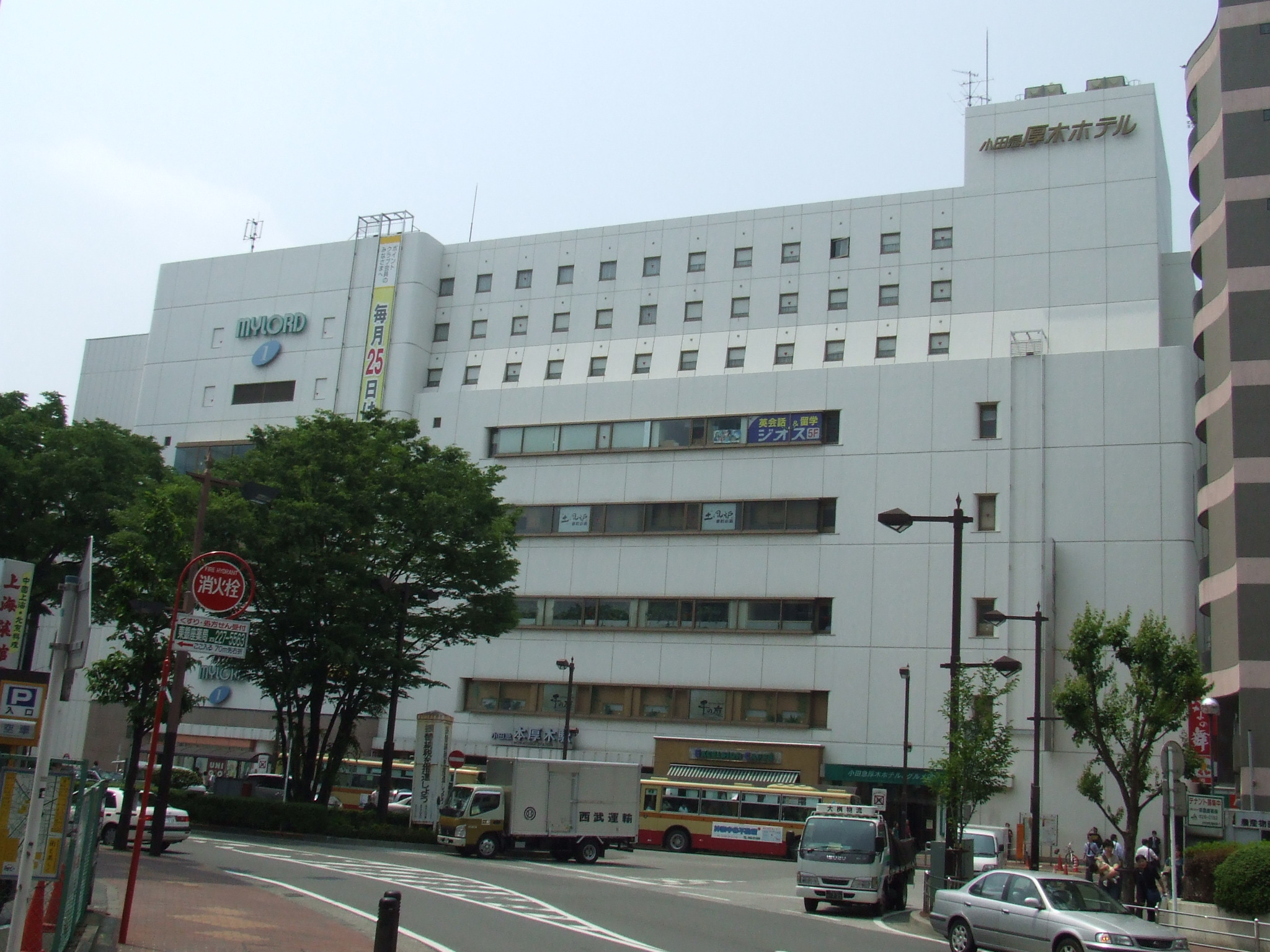
Station building (south side)

Hon-Atsugi Station (本厚木駅, Hon-Atsugi-eki) is a major passenger railway station located in the city of Atsugi, Kanagawa, Japan, operated by the private railway operator Odakyu Electric Railway.

== Lines ==
Hon-Atsugi Station is served by the Odakyu Odawara Line and is 45.5 km (28.3 mi) from the line's terminal at Shinjuku Station. Most local, section semi-express, and semi-express trains inbound from Shinjuku Station terminate at this stop and head back to Shinjuku. West of this station, most express trains stop at every station until the line terminus in Odawara Station. All rapid express and most limited express (Romancecar) services also stop here.

== Station layout ==
The station is an elevated structure built into the building used by the Mylord shopping mall (one of four such shopping malls owned by the Odakyu Group). One of the station's exits leads directly into the 4th level of the shopping mall. The station has two island platforms serving four tracks.

=== Platforms ===
1	■ Odakyu Odawara Line	for Shin-Matsuda, Odawara, (Hakone-Tozan Railway) Hakone-Yumoto
2	■ Odakyu Odawara Line	for Shin-Matsuda, Odawara, (Hakone-Tozan Railway) Hakone-Yumoto, (Asagiri) Gotemba
3	■ Odakyu Odawara Line	for Machida, Shinjuku, (Chiyoda Line)
4	■ Odakyu Odawara Line	for Machida, Shinjuku, (Chiyoda Line)

== History ==
The station opened on 1 April 1927 as Sagami-Atsugi Station (相模厚木駅) for through trains. At that time, trains stopping at every station ran between Shinjuku station and Inada-Noborito Station (稲田登戸駅), now Mukōgaoka-Yūen) and did not continue to Hon-Atsugi. Later, from 15 October 1927, express trains began stopping at the station. The first trains of the Jinchū Railroad (神中鉄道), present-day Sagami Railway) run from Ebina Station to this station on 25 November 1941 and the station was renamed Hon-Atsugi on 1 June 1944.

After the war, various services were reestablished. The local trains that had been operating between Shinjuku and Inada-Noborito station were run on the whole line, and Hon-Atsugi became a stop for local trains. At the same time, through trains were abolished (June 1945). Consecutively, Semi-Express (1 October 1946), Express (1 October 1949), Commuter Express (25 March 1955) and Commuter Semi-Express (25 March 1960) services were introduced. On 5 November 1964 the connection to the Sagami Railway was cut. From 1968, the Romancecar began stopping at Hon-Atsugi Station. From June 1976, the station building was rebuilt into an overhead station. Multi-level crossings were successively constructed around the station (29 March 1977) and from 31 March 1978, the line operated jointly with the Tokyo Metro Chiyoda Line and the JR Jōban Line. Later, on 23 March 1982, the Mylord Department Store opened within the station building and the first two automatic ticket machines were installed.

From February 1, 1984 the Asagiri Romancecar service began stopping at Hon-Atsugi and on 15 October 1984, the Atsugi Bus Centre was completed. On 15 December 2004, rapid express and semi-section express services were introduced and began stops in Hon-Atsugi. AEDs were installed in the station on 23 February 2006. In March 2006, waiting rooms were constructed on all platforms.

Station numbering was introduced in January 2014 with Hon-Atsugi being assigned station number OH34.

== Passenger statistics ==
In fiscal 2019, the station was used by an average of 151,791 passengers daily.

The passenger figures for previous years are as shown below.

Fiscal year	daily average
2005	141,390
2010	141,839
2015	152,467

== Surrounding area ==
- Atsugi City Hall
- Atsugi Municipal Hospital
- Atsugi City Plaza
- Atsugi Post Office
- Shoin University Atsugi Station Campus

The station also serves as a transfer point for local and intercity buses operated by Kanagawa Chuo, with direct service to Morioka, Shin-Yokohama Station, Narita Airport, Haneda Airport, Osaka, Kyoto, and Nara.

== See also ==
- List of railway stations in Japan
