= Shoin University =

Coordinates: 35°26′35″N 139°18′59″E

- 松蔭大学
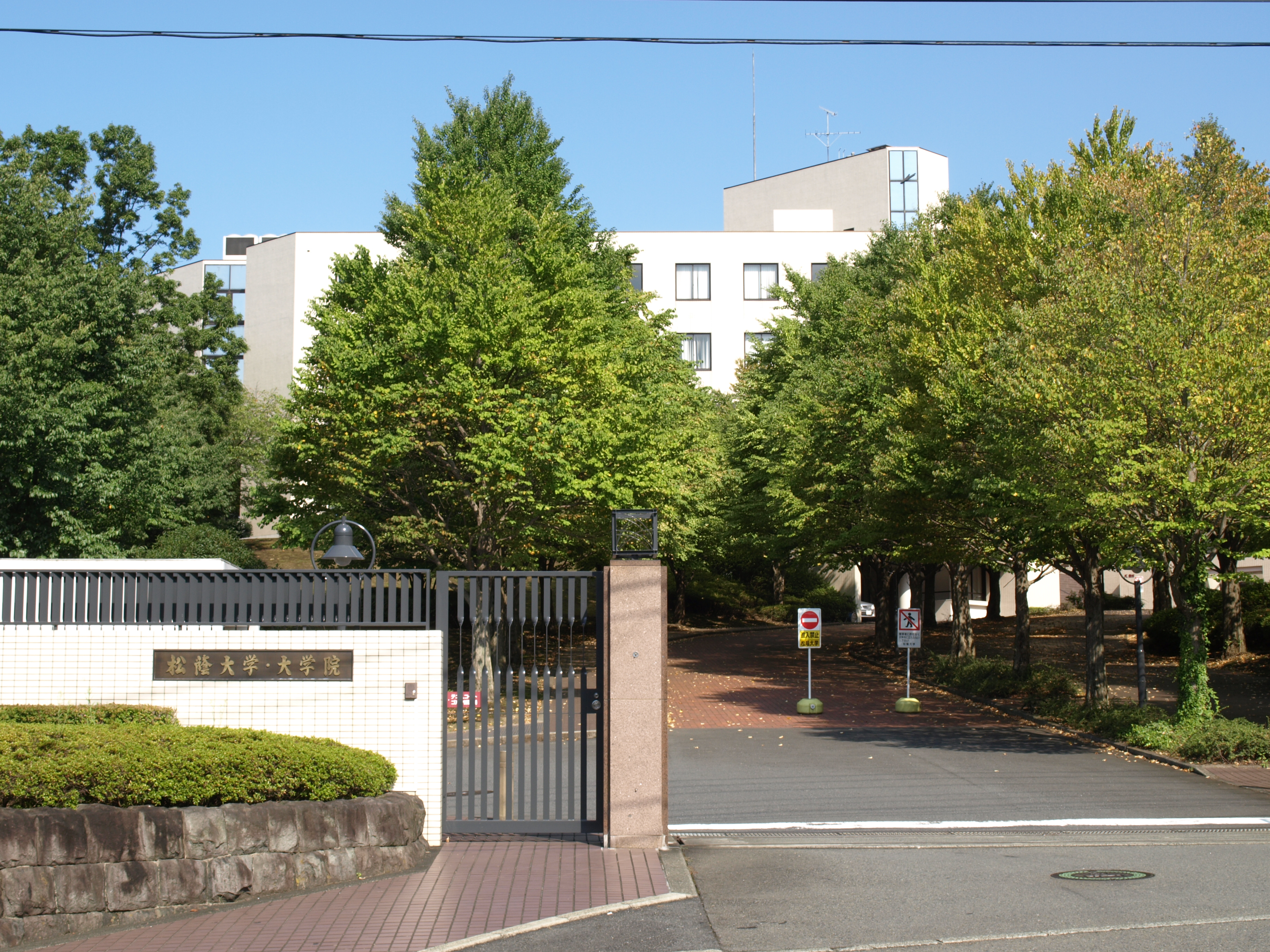
- Motto: 知行合一
- Motto in English: "Knowledge as Action"
- Type: Private, Co-educational
- Established: 1941
- Affiliations: Western Metropolitan Area University Association
- Location: Atsugi, Kanagawa, Japan
- Campus: Atsugi, Kanagawa
- Website: Official website

Shoin University (松蔭大学, Shōin daigaku) is a private university in Atsugi, Kanagawa Prefecture, Japan. Founded as a women's school in 1941, Shoin became coeducational in 2004. It is a member of the Western Metropolitan Area University Association.

== History ==
The predecessor of the school, a women's school, was founded in 1941. It was chartered as a women's junior college in 1985 and became a four-year college in 2000. In 2004, it became coeducational, adopting the present name. The Graduate School was founded in 2006, building upon existing institutional structures.

== Campuses ==
Shoin has four campuses.

- Atsugi-Morinosato Main Campus
  - Shoin Library
- Atsugi Station Campus
- Shimokitazawa Campus
- Kitazawa Station Campus

== Faculties and Departments ==
=== Undergraduate program ===
- Faculty of Business Administration and Corporate Culture (経営文化学部)
  - Department of Business Management (ビジネス・マネージメント学科)
  - Department of Business and Law (経営法学科)
- Faculty of Communication and Culture (コミュニケーション文化学部)
  - Department of Japanese Culture and Communication (日本文化コミュニケーション学科)
  - Department of Intercultural Communication (異文化コミュニケーション学科)
  - Department of Psychology for Everyday Life (生活心理学科)
  - Department of Child Welfare (こども学科)
- Faculty of Tourism, Media, and Cultural Studies (観光文化メディア学部)
  - Department of Tourism and Cultural Studies (観光文化学科)
  - Department of Media and Information Studies (メディア情報文化学科)
- Faculty of Nursing (看護学部)
  - Department of Nursing (看護学科)

=== Graduate program ===
- Graduate School of Business (経営管理研究科)
- Graduate School of Nursing (看護学研究科)

== Athletics ==
The Shoin women's basketball team is one of the most celebrated in the county. Shoin was the winner of All Japan Intercollegiate Basketball Championship tournament in 2005 and 2013. Shoin has participated in the All Japan Basketball Championship tournament ten times since its creation in 2000.

== Notable faculty ==
- Hiroyuki Yoshiie — member of the house of representatives

== Notable alumni ==
- Izumi Sakai (Zard) — singer and lyricist, the best-selling female recording artist of the 1990s
- Mio Shinozaki — professional basketball player

== Affiliated schools ==
- Shoin Preschool (松蔭幼稚園)
- Shoin Junior High School (松蔭中学校)
- Shoin Senior High School (松蔭高等学校)
