= Isehara Station =

Railway station in Isehara, Kanagawa Prefecture, Japan

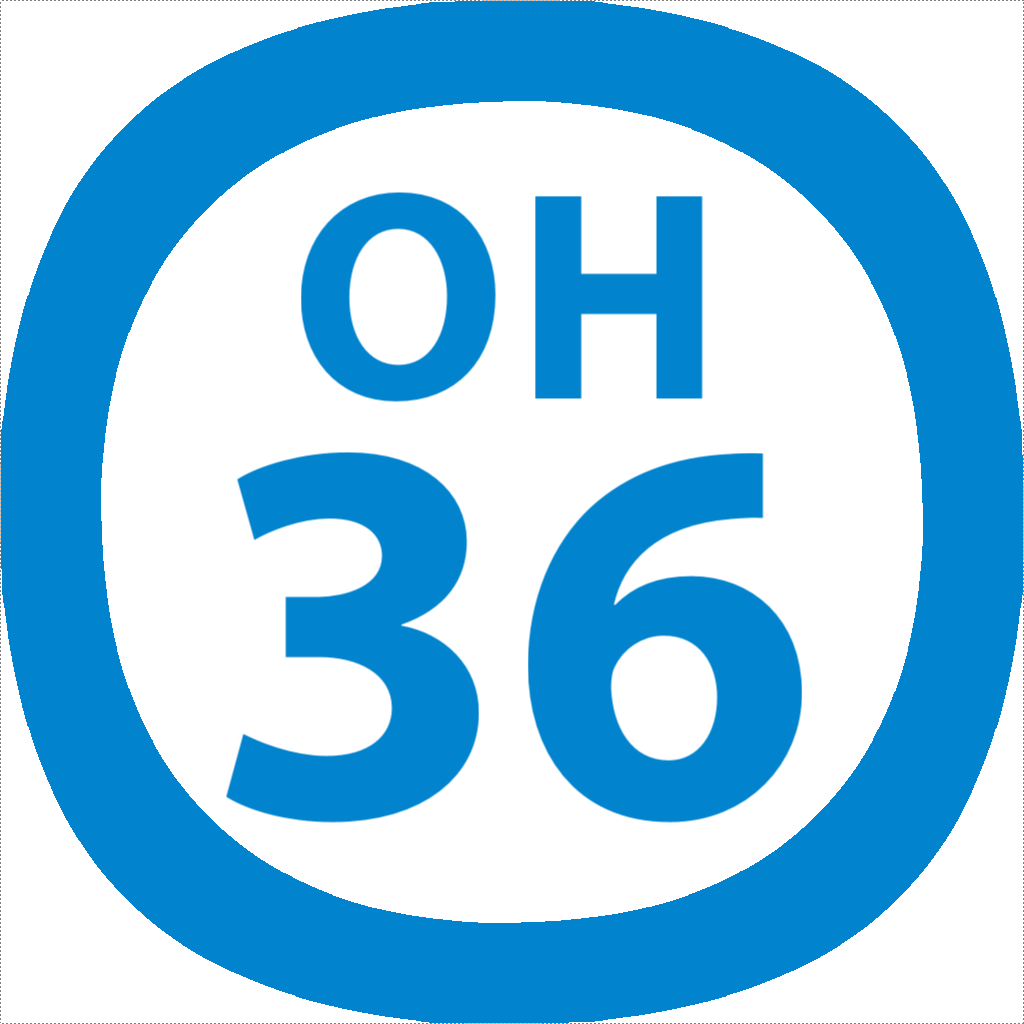
Isehara Station 伊勢原駅

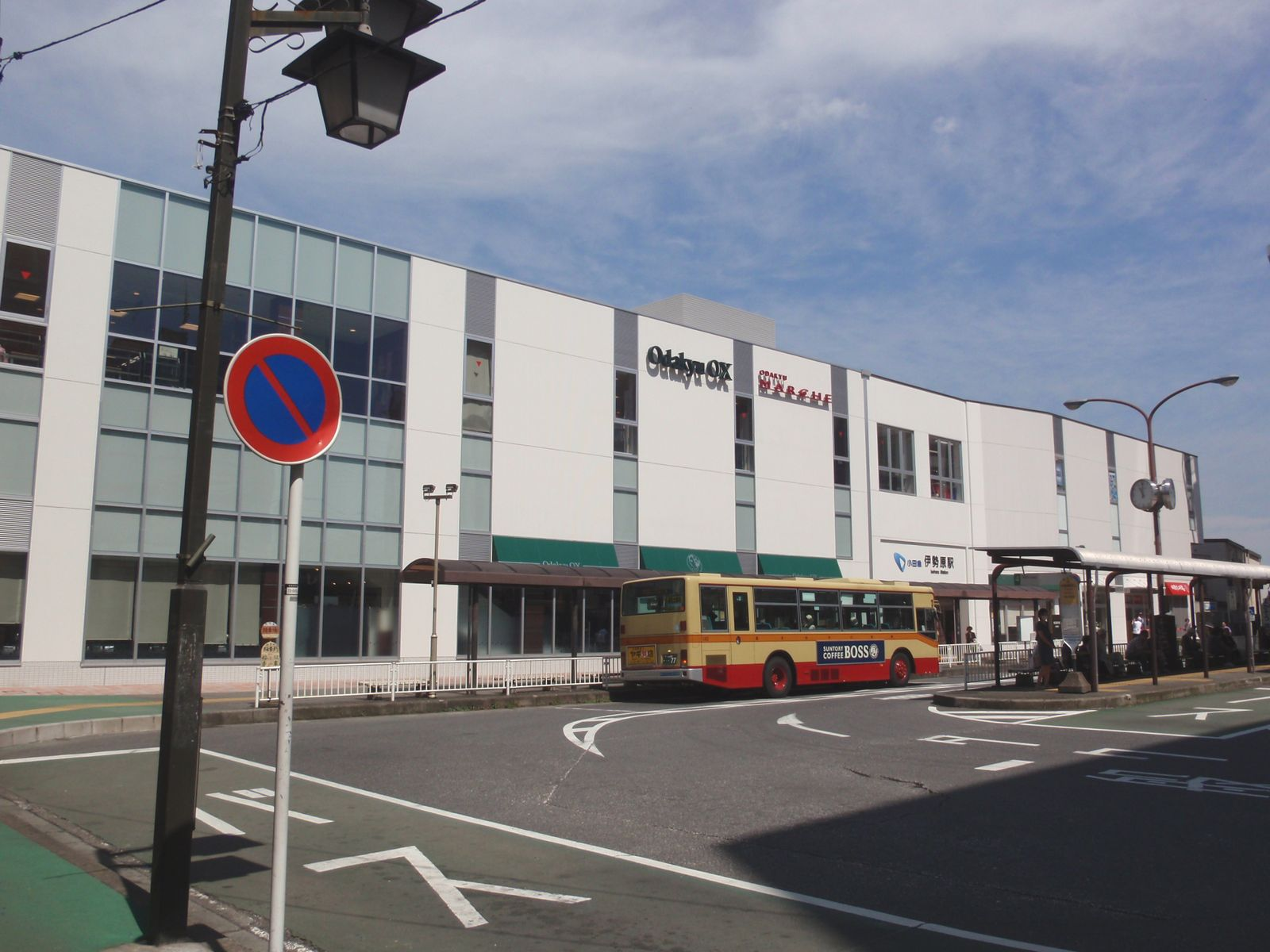
- South Exit of Isehara Station

General information
- Location: Sakuradai 1-chome, Isehara-shi, Kanagawa-ken 259-1132; Japan
- Coordinates: 35.396029°N 139.313507°E
- Operator: Odakyu Electric Railway
- Line: ■ Odakyu Odawara Line
- Distance: 52.2 km from Shinjuku
- Platforms: 2 island platform
- Connections: Bus terminal

Other information
- Status: Staffed
- Station code: OH-36
- Website: Official website

History
- Opened: 1 April 1927; 99 years ago

Passengers
- FY2019: 51,705 daily

Services
Preceding station	Odakyu	Following station
Hadano towards Hakone-Yumoto or Gotemba	Romancecar	Hon-Atsugi towards Shinjuku or Kita-Senju
Tsurumaki-Onsen towards Odawara	Odawara Line Rapid Express	Aikō-Ishida towards Shinjuku
Tsurumaki-Onsen towards Odawara	Odawara Line Express	Aikō-Ishida towards Shinjuku or Yoyogi-Uehara
Terminus	Odawara Line Commuter Semi Express	Aikō-Ishida towards Yoyogi-Uehara
Tsurumaki-Onsen towards Odawara	Odawara Line Local	Aikō-Ishida towards Shinjuku or Yoyogi-Uehara
Location
- Location within Kanagawa Prefecture Location within Japan

Isehara Station (伊勢原駅, Isehara-eki) is a passenger railway station located in the city of Isehara, Kanagawa Prefecture, Japan. The station operated by the private railway operator Odakyu Electric Railway.

== Lines ==
Isehara Station is served by the Odakyu Odawara Line, and lies 52.2 rail kilometers from the line's terminal at Shinjuku Station.

== Station layout ==
The station has two island platforms with four tracks, connected to the station building by a footbridge.

=== Platforms ===
1	■ Odakyu Odawara Line	WestboundShin-Matsuda and Odawara
2	■ Odakyu Odawara Line	Westbound (For Shin-Matsuda, and Odawara)
3	■ Odakyu Odawara Line	Eastbound ( Sagami-Ono, Shin-Yurigaoka, Chiyoda line Ayase and Shinjuku
4	■ Odakyu Odawara Line	Eastbound (For Sagami-Ono, Shin-Yurigaoka, Yoyogi-Uehara, Chiyoda line Ayase, and Shinjuku)

== History ==
Isehara Station was opened on 1 April 1927, on the Odakyu Odawara Line of the Odakyu Electric Railway with normal and 6-car limited express services. A new station building was completed in 1967. This was replaced in 2008 by the current station building, with includes a large department store and supermarket operated by the Odakyu Company.

Station numbering was introduced in January 2014 with Isehara being assigned station number OH36.

== Passenger statistics ==
In fiscal 2019, the station was used by an average of 51,705 passengers daily.

The passenger figures for previous years are as shown below.

Fiscal year	daily average
2005	50,170
2010	49,703
2015	51,733

== Surrounding area ==
- Isehara Elementary School
- Isehara Sakuradai Post Office
- Isehara Junior High School

== See also ==
- List of railway stations in Japan
