= Isehara =

Isehara 伊勢原市
- City
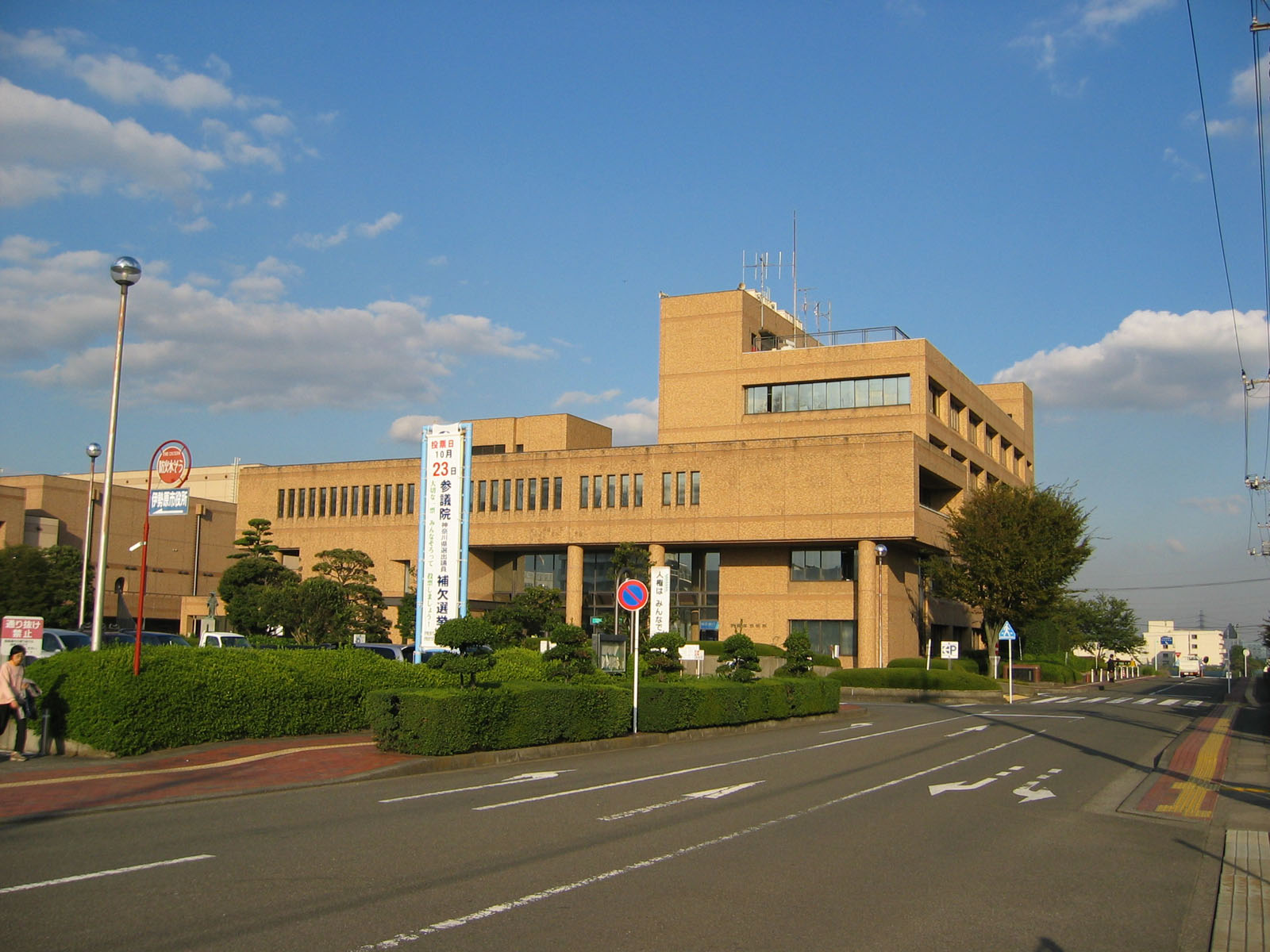
- Isehara City Hall

- Flag Seal

- Location of Isehara in Kanagawa Prefecture

- Coordinates: 35°23′N 139°18′E
- Country: Japan
- Region: Kantō
- Prefecture: Kanagawa
- First official recorded: 655 BC (official)
- Town settled: December 1, 1954
- City settled: March 1, 1971

Government
  - Mayor: Tetsuya Hagiwara (since October 2024)

Area
  - Total: 55.56 km^{2} (21.45 sq mi)

Population (February 1, 2024)
  - Total: 101,415
  - Density: 1,825/km^{2} (4,728/sq mi)
- Time zone: UTC+9 (Japan Standard Time)
- City symbols
  - Tree: Castanopsis
  - Flower: Chinese bellflower
  - Bird: Copper pheasant
- Phone number: 0463-94-4711
- Address: 348, Tanaka, Isehara-shi, Kanagawa-ken 259-1188
- Website: Official website

Isehara (伊勢原市, Isehara-shi; Japanese pronunciation: [ì.sé̞.hä̀.ɾä̀, -hä́.ɾä́(.ɕì)]) is a city located in Kanagawa Prefecture, Japan. As of 1 February 2024, the city had an estimated population of 101,415 and a population density of 1800 persons per km^{2}. The total area of the city is 55.56 square kilometres (21.45 sq mi).

== Geography ==
Isehara is located in the hilly center of Kanagawa Prefecture. A large portion of the city is within the Tanzawa-Ōyama Quasi-National Park.

=== Surrounding municipalities ===
Kanagawa Prefecture

- Atsugi
- Hadano
- Hiratsuka

=== Climate ===
Isehara has a humid subtropical climate (Köppen Cfa) characterized by warm summers and cool winters with light to no snowfall. The average annual temperature in Isehara is 14.6 °C. The average annual rainfall is 1906 mm with September as the wettest month. The temperatures are highest on average in August, at around 24.2 °C, and lowest in January, at around 2.9 °C.

== Demographics ==
Per Japanese census data, the population of Isehara has recently plateaued after several decades of strong growth.

Historical population
Year	Pop.	±%
1960	26,894	—
1970	43,751	+62.7%
1980	70,052	+60.1%
1990	89,567	+27.9%
2000	99,544	+11.1%
2010	101,039	+1.5%
2020	101,780	+0.7%

== History ==
The area of present-day Isehara City was part of several large shōen in Sagami Province during the Kamakura period. During the Edo period, it was nominally part of Odawara Domain, although large portions were tenryō territory controlled by the shōgun in Edo through various hatamoto.

After the Meiji Restoration and with the establishment of the district system in 1878, the area came under the control of Ōsumi District (大住郡, Ōsumi-gun), Kanagawa Prefecture and became Isehara Town on April 1, 1889 with the establishment of the modern municipalities system. On March 26, 1896, Ōsumi District and Yurugi District were merged to create Naka District. The town began to experience rapid growth after the opening of Isehara Station on the Odakyu Electric Railway on April 1, 1929. On December 21, 1954, the town expanded through merger with neighboring Oyama Town and three villages. Its area expanded further on September 30, 1956, through annexation of a portion of neighboring Okazaki Village. Isehara was elevated to city status on March 1, 1971.

== Government ==
Isehara has a mayor-council form of government with a directly elected mayor and a unicameral city council of 20 members. Isehara contributes one member to the Kanagawa Prefectural Assembly. In terms of national politics, the city is part of Kanagawa 16th district of the lower house of the Diet of Japan.

== Economy ==
Known primarily as a bedroom community for Yokohama and the greater Tokyo area, Isehara is also home to Amada Co, a machine tool manufacturer and a number of manufacturing plants. It is also home to a Maru-Chan (Toyo Suisan) instant noodle factory.

== Education ==
Isehara has ten public elementary schools and four public middle schools operated by the city government. The city has two public high schools operated by the Kanagawa Prefectural Board of Education, and the prefecture also operates one special education school for the handicapped. There is also one private high school. Tokyo-based Senshu University, Sanno University and Tokai University all have a campus within Isehara.

== Transportation ==
=== Railway ===
Odakyu Electric Railway – Odakyū Odawara Line

- Isehara

=== Highway ===
- National Route 246, to central Tokyo or Numazu

== Sister cities ==
- Chino, Nagano, Japan, since January 21, 1986
- La Mirada, California, United States, since September 21, 1981

== Local attractions ==
- Mount Ōyama

== Gallery ==
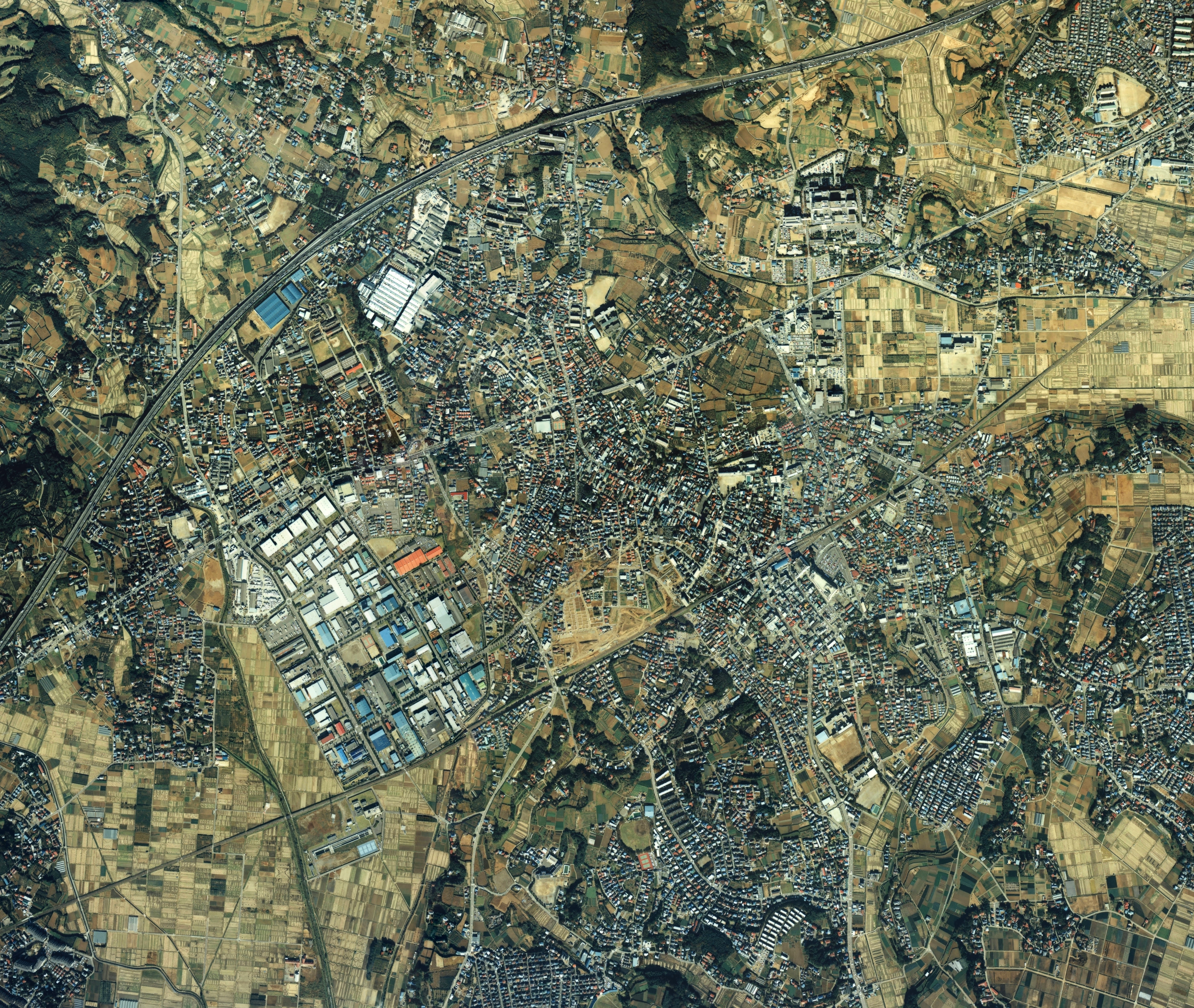
Isehara city's center area in 1988

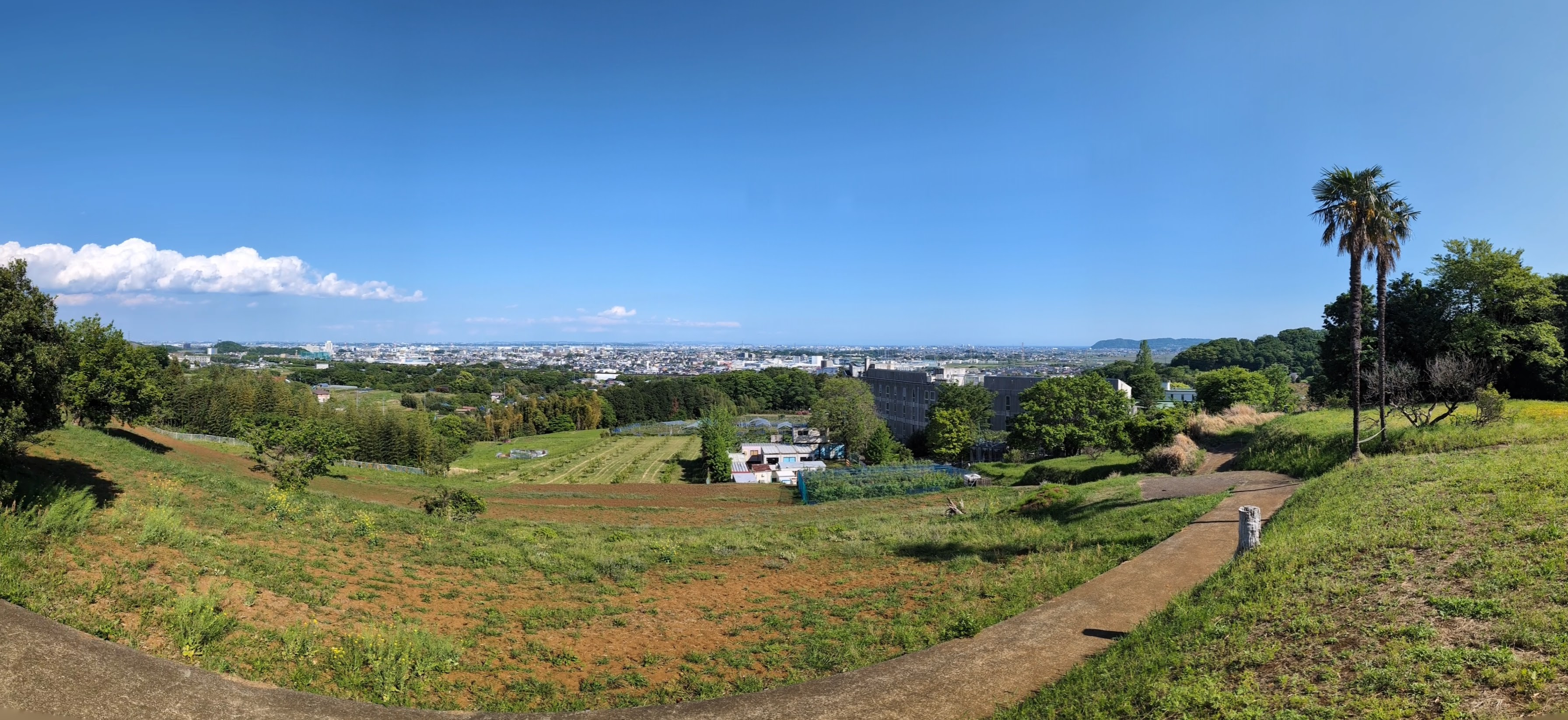
View of around Isehara.

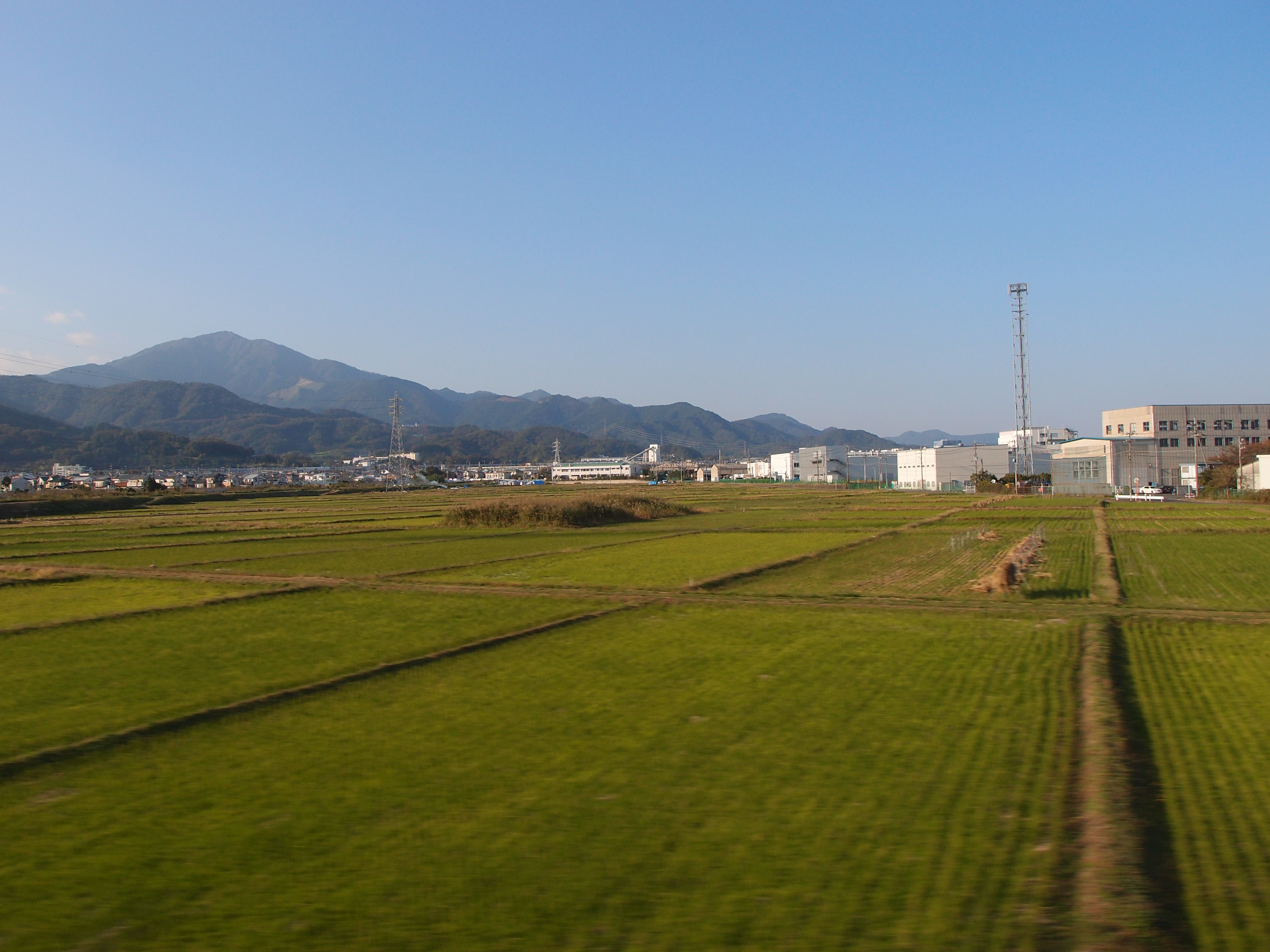
View from Odakyu Odawara Line in Isehara. Mount Oyama on the left. Looking due north.

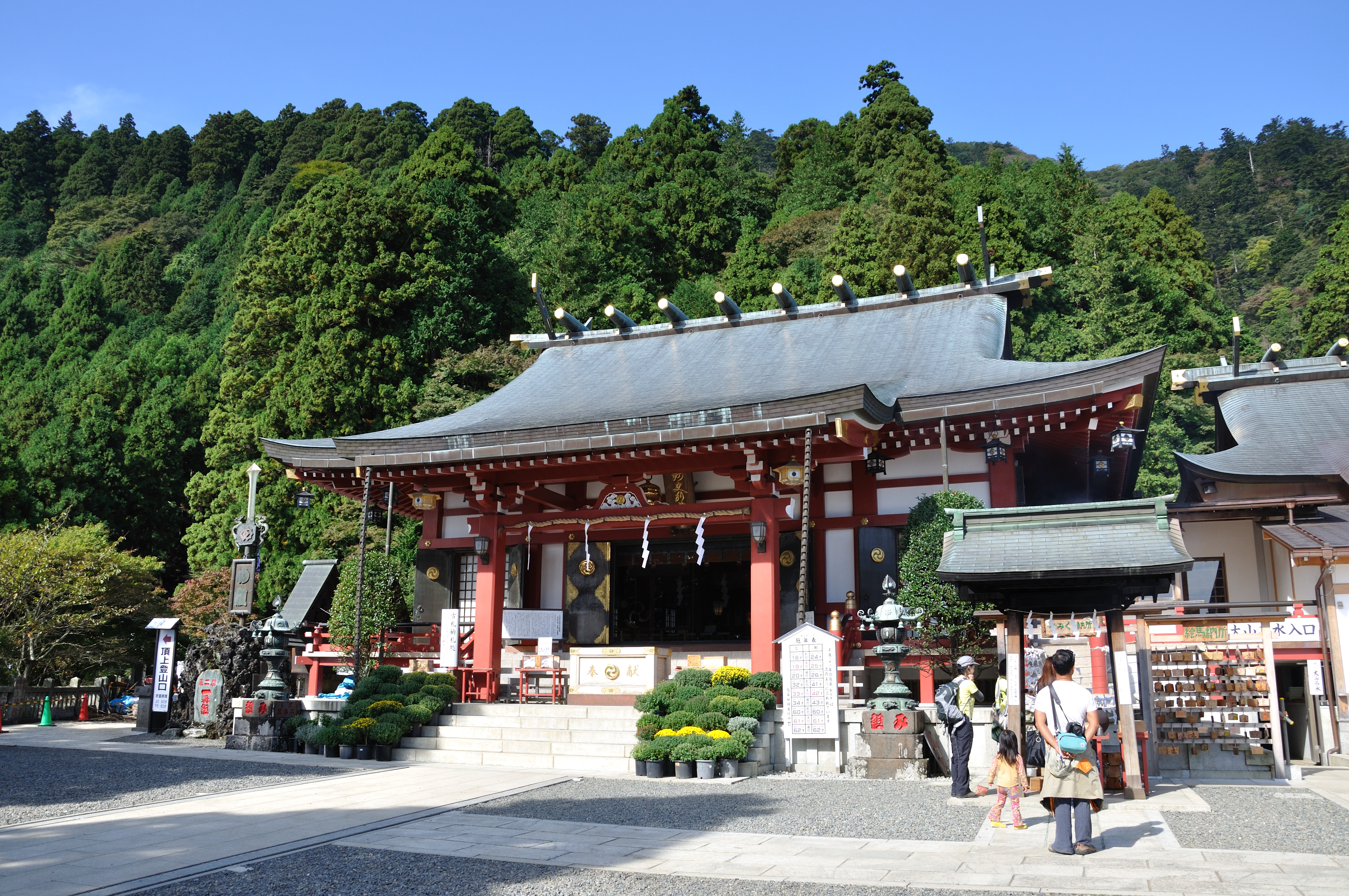
Mount Oyama Afuri Jinja

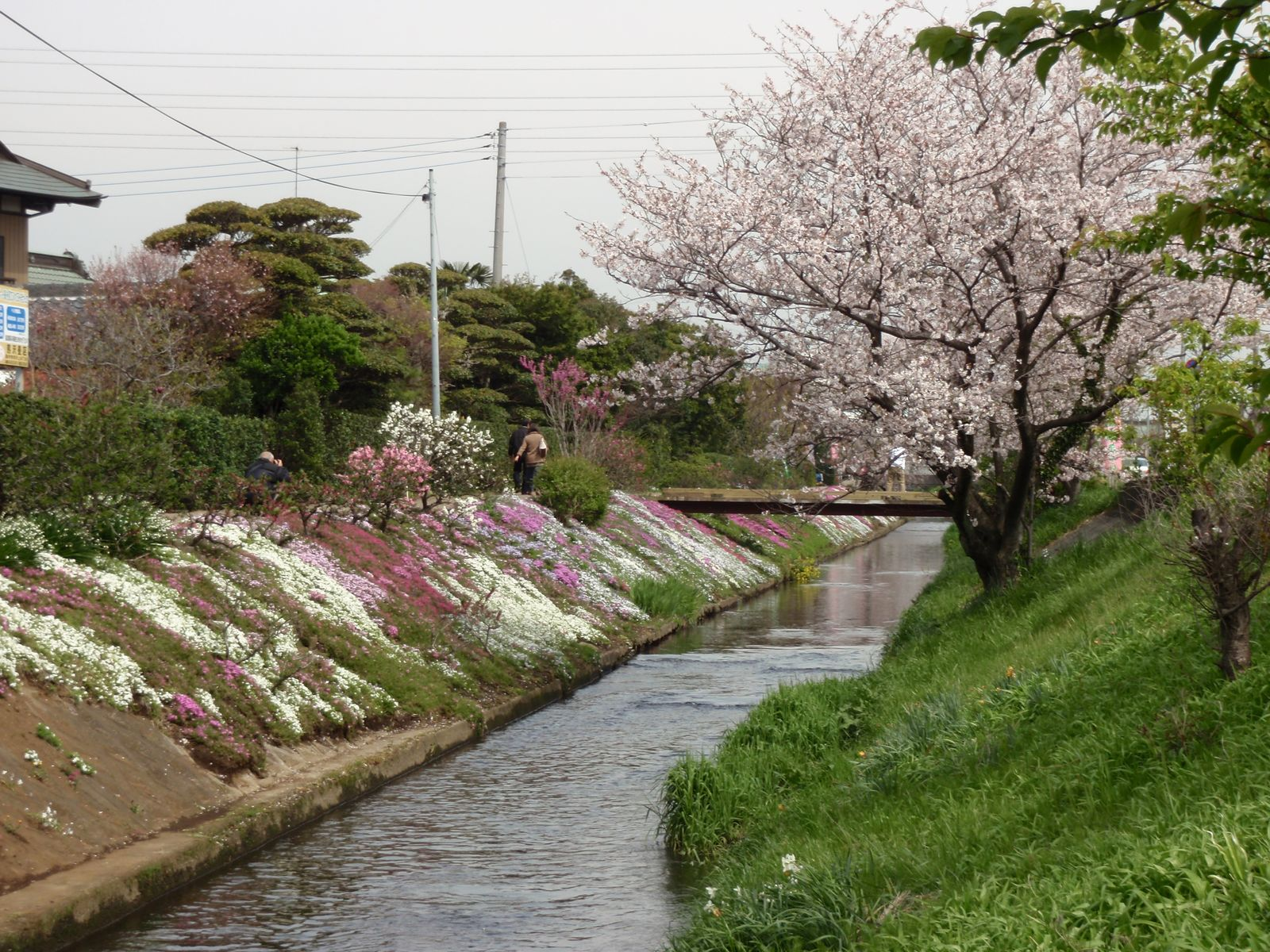
Isehara Shibuta River

== Notable people from Isehara ==
- Ōta Dōkan, Sengoku period warlord
- Yoshiyuki Kamei, politician
- Zentaro Kamei, politician
- Yasuhiro Kido, kickboxer
- Saeko Shimazu, voice actress
- Shinobu Yaguchi, film director and screenwriter
- Shiho Yoshimura, former volleyball player
