= Kanagawa Institute of Technology =

Coordinates: 35°29′10″N 139°20′30″E

- 神奈川工科大学; Kanagawa kōka daigaku
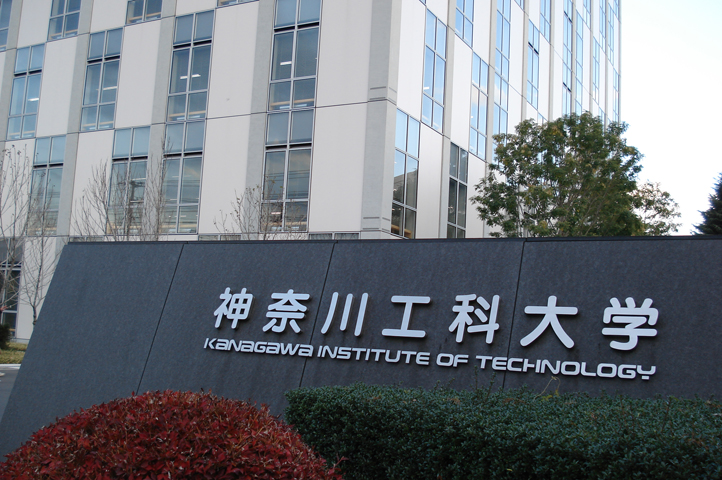
- Type: Private
- Established: 1975
- Undergraduates: Faculty of Engineering; Faculty of Informatics; Faculty of Creative Engineering; Faculty of Applied Bioscience; Faculty of Nursing
- Postgraduates: Graduate school of Engineering
- Location: Atsugi, Kanagawa, Japan
- Website: Official website

Kanagawa Institute of Technology (神奈川工科大学, Kanagawa kōka daigaku) (KAIT) is a private university in Atsugi, Kanagawa Prefecture, Japan.

The predecessor of the school, a vocational school, was founded in 1963. It was chartered as a university in 1975. The present name was adopted in 1988.

== Abstract ==
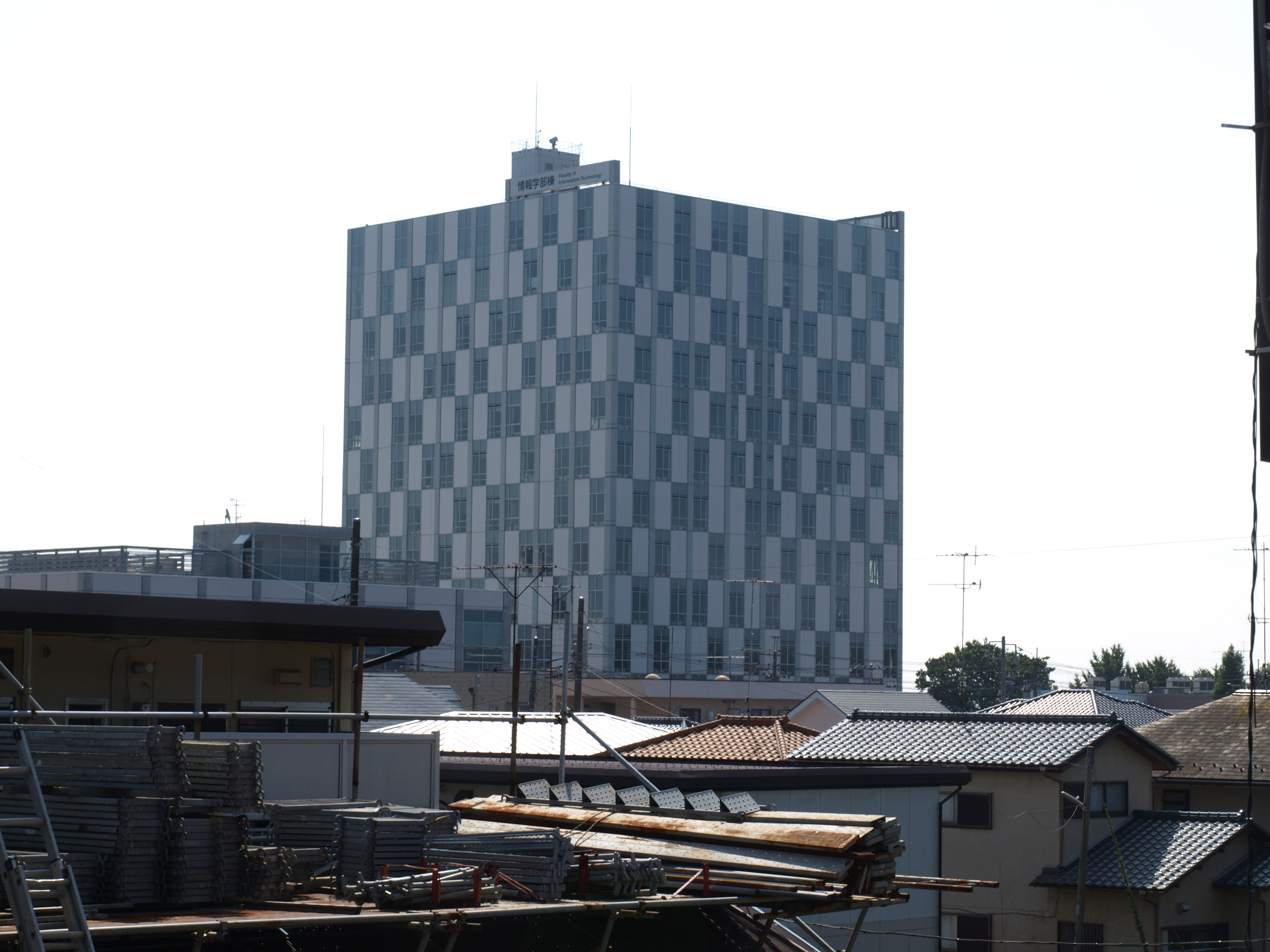

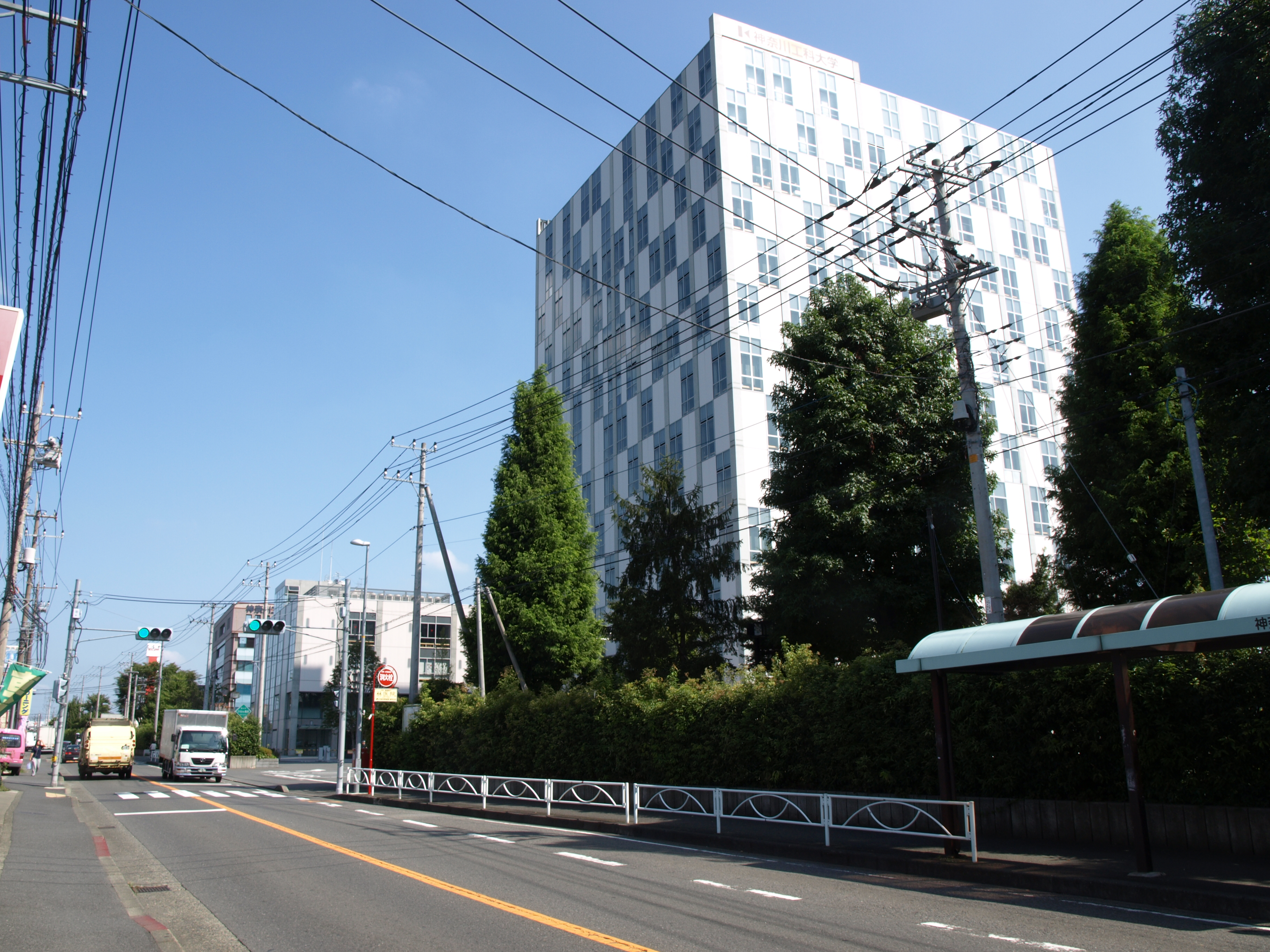

The university has a campus at the middle of Kanagawa prefecture, Atsugi city.

The Bachelor program has 5 faculties and 13 departments. The departments are: Faculty of Engineering (Department of Mechanical Engineering, Department of Electrical, Electronic and Computer Engineering, Department of Applied Chemistry, Department of Clinical Engineering), Faculty of Creative Engineering (Department of Automotive Systems Development Engineering, Department of Robotics and Mechatronics, Department of Home Electronics Development), Faculty of Applied Bio-Science (Department of Applied Bioscience, Department of Nutrition and Life Science), Faculty of Informatics (Department of Information Engineering, Department of Information Network and Communication, Department of Information Media), and Faculty of Nursing (Department of Nursing). Department of Information Network and Communication, Department of Information Media), and the Faculty of Nursing (Department of Nursing).

Graduate School includes the Graduate School of Engineering (Master's and Doctoral Programs in Mechanical Engineering, Electrical and Electronic Engineering, Applied Chemistry and Bioscience, Mechanical Systems Engineering, and Information Technology, as well as the Master's Program in Robotics and Mechatronics).

The number of students, including graduate students, is approximately 5,000.

== Graduate school ==
- Graduate School of Engineering
  - Department of Mechanical Engineering (Master's Course, Doctoral Course)
  - Department of Electrical and Electronic Engineering (Master's Course, Doctoral Course)
  - Department of Applied Chemistry and Bioscience (Master's Course, Doctoral Course)
  - Department of Mechanical Systems Engineering (Master's Course, Doctoral Course)
  - Department of Information Engineering (Master's Course, Doctoral Course)
  - Department of Robotics and Mechatronics Systems (Master's Course)

== Education ==
=== Special Department ===
- developed for foreign student
  - Japanese Language Training Course

== Student Life ==
=== International Exchange ===
In 2006, the International Office was renovated and a new lounge was opened in a renovated classroom. However, the space was too small and was filled with international students and current students at lunchtime, so the lounge was moved to a larger space in spring 2007. In September 2006, the Special Department program for international students was established. In September 2006, the International Student Special Department Program was established, and at the same time, the International Club was established under the direct control of the International Affairs Division to promote exchange between current students and international students.

The International Office serves as the contact point for university-sponsored language training twice a year: in February at University of Washington in United States (4 weeks) and in August at Edith Cowan University in Australia (3 weeks). In addition to the language training in August, some of the programs in February are unique programs in specialized fields, such as overseas mechanical engineering training and overseas bioengineering training, where students can learn specialized skills while studying the language. In addition to language training, there are also overseas mechanical engineering training and overseas bioengineering training programs. Anyone, regardless of department, can participate.

== Employment ==
Of the students who apply for employment, the job offer rate is 98.7% (2005). The percentage of students who go on to higher education is 13.1% (2005).

The Faculty of Engineering and the Faculty of Informatics have Curator programs.

== Facilities ==
- Annex Library
- Institute for Advanced Technology
- KAIT Workshop
- Mechanical and Electrical Electronics Research Building
  - Flight Simulator Lab.
- Applied Chemistry Research Building
- Automotive System Development Research Building
  - Design Studio
- Robotics and Mechatronics Research Building
  - Life Model Room
- Applied Bioscience Research Building
  - Bioscience Center
  - Nutritionist Training Facility
- Engineering Education and Research Building
  - Nanotechnology Laboratory
  - Chemistry Laboratory
- Automotive Engineering Building
  - Driving Simulator Room
- Robotics and Project Building
  - Exhibition Room
- Electrical and Chemical Laboratory Building
  - Circuit Design Education Center
- HEMS Certification Support Center
- Nursing and Medical Care Building
- Student cafeteria
  - 1st Cafeteria(Ginza Suehiro)
  - 2nd Cafeteria (Kanagawa Institute of Technology Planning)
  - [Cafeteria 2] (Kanagawa Institute of Technology)
  - [Cafeteria No.3] (Kanagawa Institute of Technology Planning)
  - McDonald's at Kanagawa Institute of Technology
  - Cafeteria (also known as the fourth cafeteria)

Some of the seating in the second cafeteria is outdoors on the terrace.

- Exercise facilities
  - There is a baseball stadium called "KAIT Stadium", which is equipped with nighttime facilities and an electronic bulletin board. It also appears in the movie version of ROOKIES as "Tama Sports University".

== External Relations ==
- The Open University of Japan - Credit transfer agreement signed
- Private Engineering and Technology Association - Mutual library use agreement
- Western Tokyo Metropolitan University Credit Transfer Agreement
- Kanagawa Prefecture Graduate School Academic Exchange Agreement
- Academic Exchange Agreement with Dongseo University
- Kanagawa Prefecture Graduate School Academic Exchange Agreement concluded with Dongseo University.
- Kanagawa Prefectural Industrial Technology Research Institute (KISTEC) - Comprehensive Collaborative Agreement

- Partner universities for training implementation (partner universities that offer language and specialized field training, study abroad programs, etc.)
  - State University of Washington
  - South Seattle Community College
  - Green River Community College
  - DigiPen Institute of Technology
  - Lake Washington Institute of Technology
  - Oxford Brookes University
  - Yangzhou University
  - Ming Tao University
- Science Partnership Program - Cooperation with each high school based on the "Science Partnership Program Project", which is part of the "Science and Technology and Science Love Plan" promoted by the Ministry of Education, Culture, Sports, Science and Technology.
