= Tokyo Jogakkan College =

College in Machida, Tokyo, Japan

Coordinates: 35°30′00.02″N 139°28′02.50″E

Tokyo Jogakkan College 東京女学館大学

Location
- Tsuruma, Machida, Tokyo, Japan

Information
- Type: Private women's college
- Established: 1956
- Closed: 2016

Tokyo Jogakkan College (東京女学館大学, Tōkyō jogaku-kan daigaku, TJKC) was a private women's college in Machida, Tokyo, Japan.

== History ==
The predecessor of the school was founded in 1888, and it was chartered as a junior college in 1956.

In 1995 TJKC entered into an agreement with The School for International Training to create an English medium degree program focusing on women and leadership. Cross-cultural projects brought TJK students to collaborate with peers in the Philippines. In 2002 it became a four-year liberal arts college with a small student body of no more than 480 pupils.

Students graduating from TJKC received a bachelor's degree in International Liberal Arts.

In May 2012 it was announced that the university would stop recruiting new students from spring 2013 and would close down permanently after the last of the current students graduate in March 2016. The declining birth rate in Japan and intense competition from other universities were both cited as reasons for the school's closure.
