= Atsugi =

City in Kanagawa Prefecture, Japan

Atsugi 厚木市
- Special city
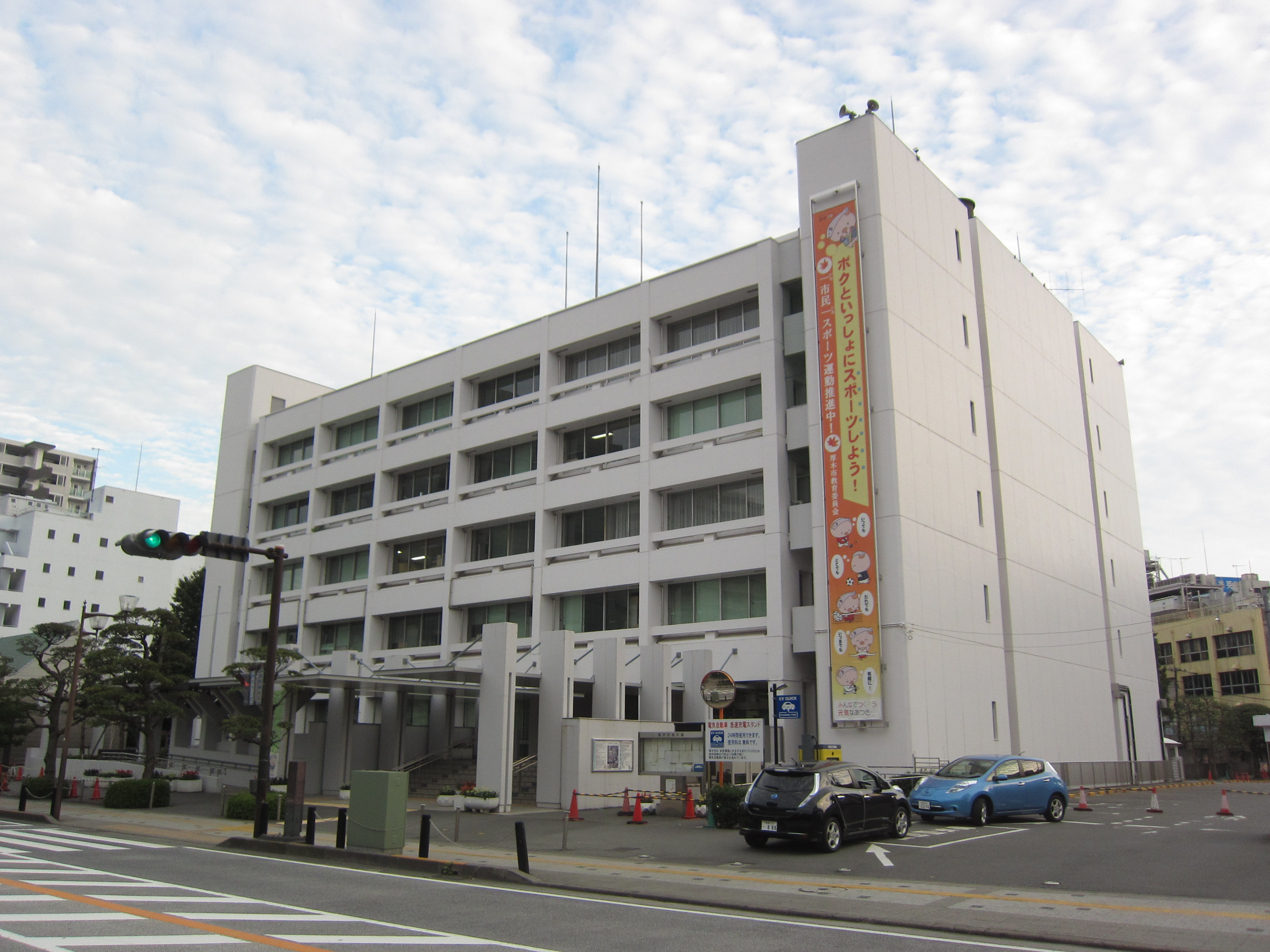
- Atsugi City Hall

- Flag Seal

- Location of Atsugi in Kanagawa Prefecture

- Atsugi (Kanto Area) Atsugi (Japan)
- Coordinates: 35°26′00″N 139°22′00″E
- Country: Japan
- Region: Kantō
- Prefecture: Kanagawa
- Town Settled: April 1, 1889
- City Settled: February 1, 1955

Government
  - Mayor: Takahiro Yamaguchi (from February 2023)

Area
  - Total: 93.83 km^{2} (36.23 sq mi)

Population (June 1, 2021)
  - Total: 223,960
  - Density: 2,387/km^{2} (6,182/sq mi)
- Time zone: UTC+9 (Japan Standard Time)
  - Tree: Maple
  - Flower: Rhododendron indicum
  - Bird: Long-tailed tit
- Phone number: 046-223-1511
- Address: 3-17-17 Nakacho, Atsugi-shi, Kanagawa-ken; 243-8511
- Website: Official website

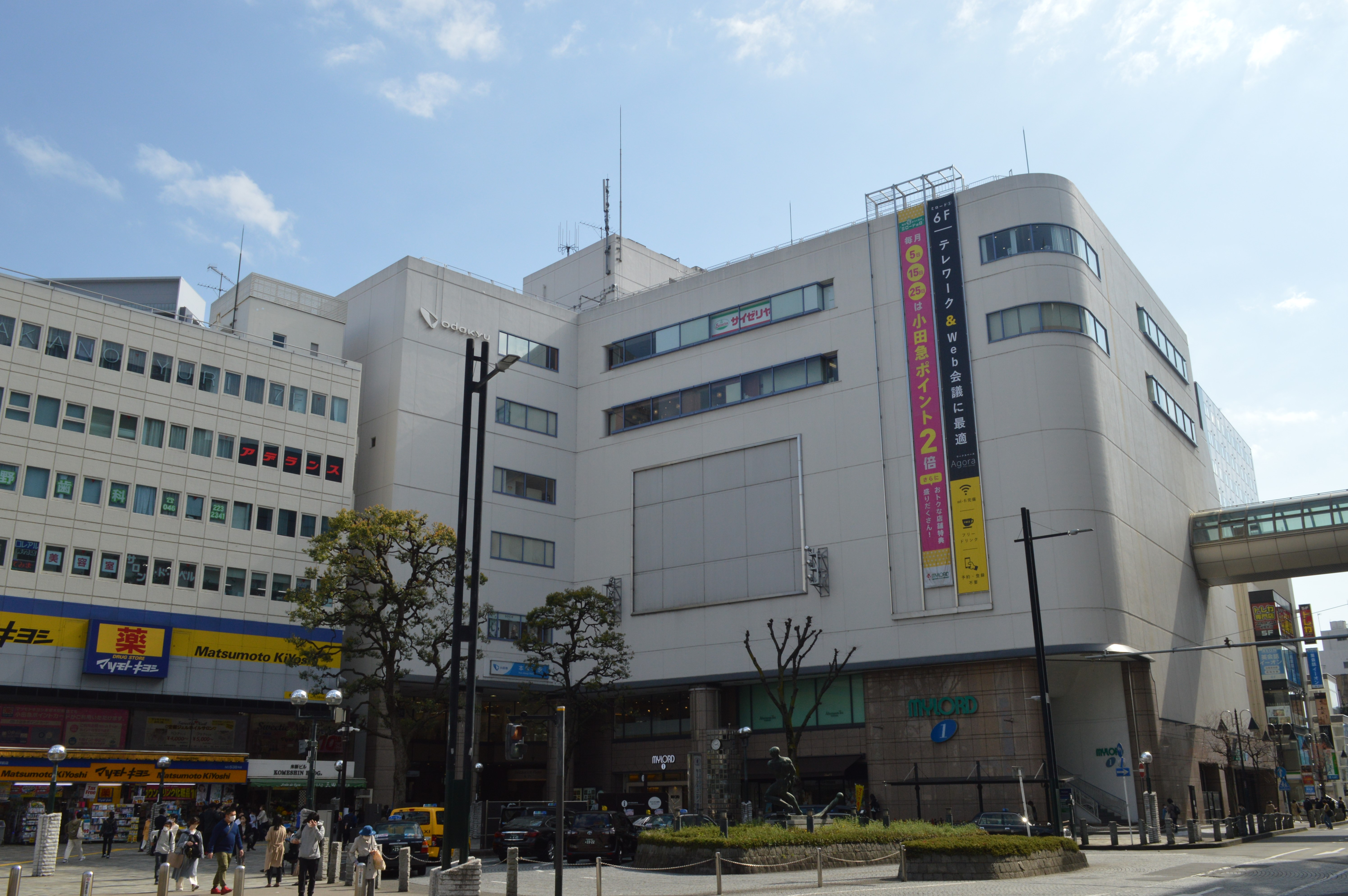
North side of Hon-Atsugi Station and MyLord department store in central Atsugi

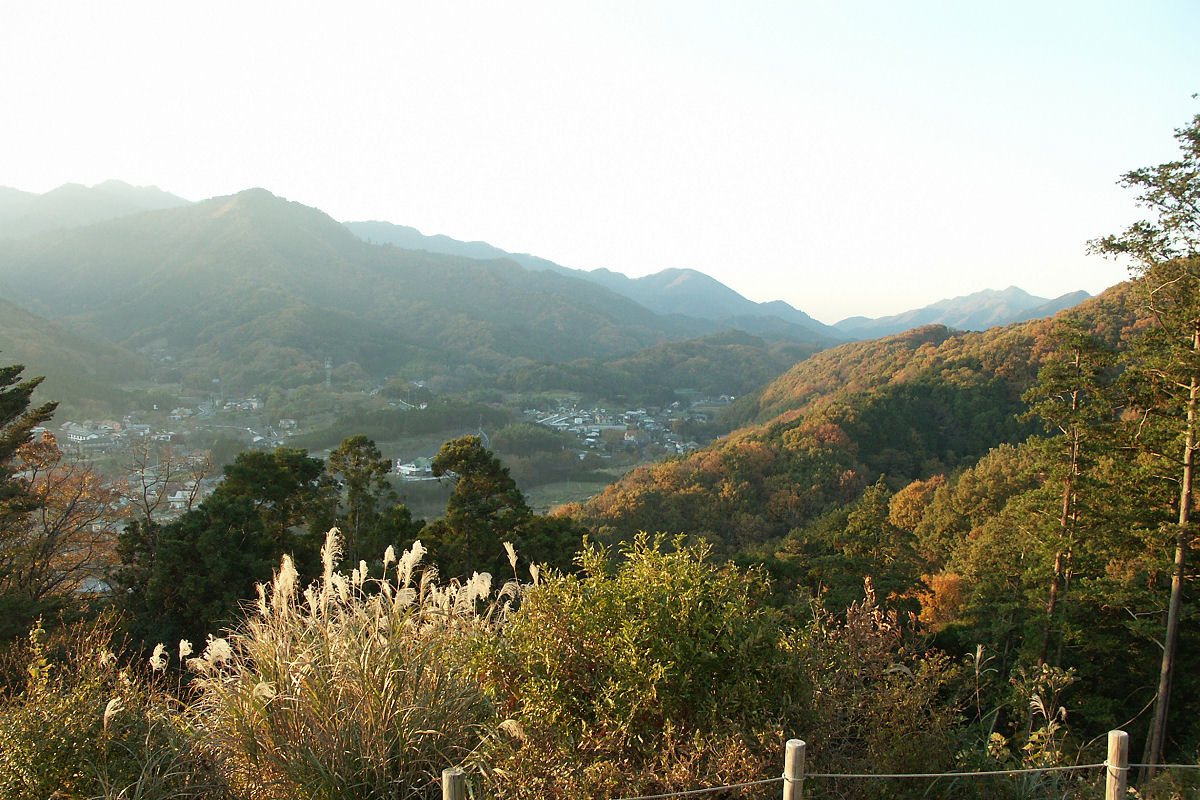
Nanasawa near Atsugi

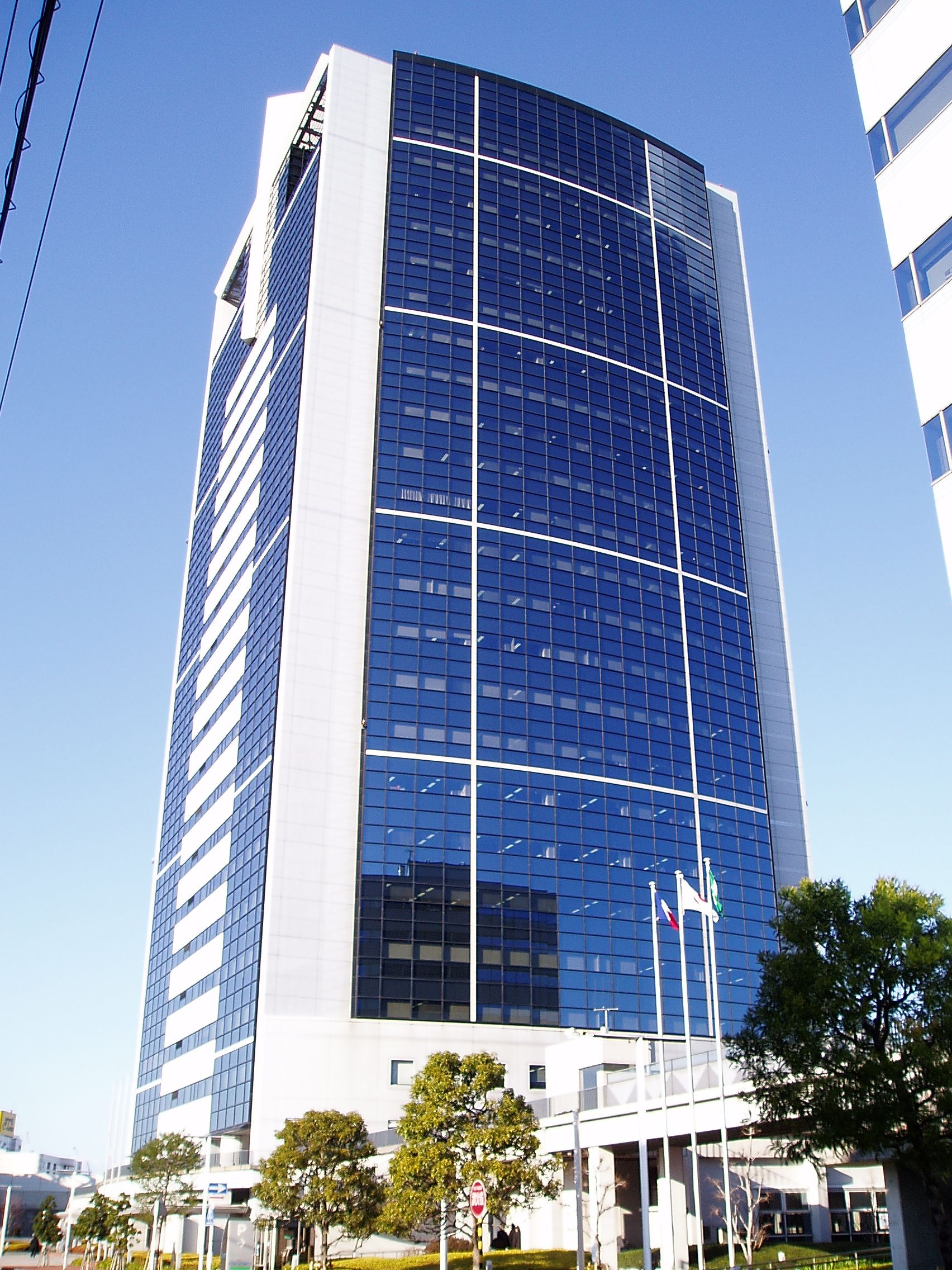
The Atsugi AXT office building lies south of central Atsugi, near the interchange of the Tōmei Expressway

Atsugi (厚木市, Atsugi-shi; Japanese pronunciation: [ä̀.t͡sɨ́.ɡ̟ʲí(.ɕì), -ŋ̟ʲí(.ɕì)]) is a city in Kanagawa Prefecture, Japan. As of 1 June 2021, the city had an estimated population of 223,960 and a population density of 2400 persons per km^{2}. The total area of the city is 93.83 square kilometres (36.23 sq mi). While the name "Atsugi" is often associated with the United States Navy base named Naval Air Facility Atsugi, the base is actually not in Atsugi, but straddles the border between the nearby cities of Ayase and Yamato.

== Geography ==
Atsugi is located in the hilly center of Kanagawa Prefecture, approximately 45 kilometres (28 mi) from central Tokyo or 30 kilometres (19 mi) from central Yokohama. It is located at the northern end of the Sagami Plain created by the Sagami River, which originates from Lake Yamanaka, and straddles the Tanzawa Mountains in the west and the plain on the west bank of the Sagami River to the southeast. The Nakatsu River and Koayu River, which originate from the Higashitanzawa Mountains, join the Sagami River, which forms the border with Ebina, Zama, and Sagamihara. Parts of the western portion of the city are within the Tanzawa-Ōyama Quasi-National Park and include Mount Ōyama.

=== Surrounding municipalities ===
Kanagawa Prefecture

- Aikawa
- Ebina
- Hadano
- Hiratsuka
- Isehara
- Kiyokawa
- Sagamihara
- Samukawa
- Zama

=== Climate ===
Atsugi has a humid subtropical climate (Köppen Cfa) characterized by warm summers and cool winters with light to no snowfall. The average annual temperature in Atsugi is 13.4 °C. The average annual rainfall is 1906 mm with September as the wettest month. The temperatures are highest on average in August, at around 24.5 °C, and lowest in January, at around 2.3 °C.

== Demographics ==
Per Japanese census data, the population of Atsugi grew rapidly during the late 20th century and has plateaued in the 21st.

Historical population
Year	Pop.	±%
1920	28,786	—
1930	30,680	+6.6%
1940	32,981	+7.5%
1950	43,191	+31.0%
1960	46,239	+7.1%
1970	82,894	+79.3%
1980	145,392	+75.4%
1990	197,283	+35.7%
2000	217,369	+10.2%
2010	224,420	+3.2%
2020	223,705	−0.3%

== History ==
The area around present-day Atsugi city has been inhabited for thousands of years. Archaeologists have found ceramic shards from the Jōmon period at numerous locations in the area. By the Kamakura period, this area part of the Mōri shōen, part of the holdings of Ōe no Hiromoto. His descendants, the Mōri clan later ruled Chōshū domain. During the Kamakura period, the area was also known for its foundry industry for the production of bells for Buddhist temples. The area came under the control of the Ashikaga clan in the early Muromachi period and was later part of the territories of the Later Hōjō clan from Odawara. With the start of the Edo period, the area was tenryō territory controlled directly by the Tokugawa shogunate, but administered through various hatamoto, as well as exclaves under the control of Odawara Domain, Sakura Domain, Mutsuura Domain, Ogino-Yamanaka Domain and Karasuyama Domain. After the Meiji Restoration, the area was consolidated into Aikō District of Kanagawa Prefecture by 1876. Atsugi town was created on April 1, 1889, through merger of several small hamlets, with the establishment of the modern municipalities system. Atsugi was elevated to city status on February 1, 1955, through merger with neighboring Mutsuai Village, Koaiyu Village, Tamagawa Village and Minamimori Village. The city expanded on July 8, 1958, through merger with neighboring Echi Village, and with Aikawa Village from Naka District. On September 30, 1956, Ogino Village joined with Atsugi. In April 2000, Atsugi exceeded 200,000 in population and was proclaimed a special city with increased autonomy from the central government.

== Government ==
Atsugi has a mayor-council form of government with a directly elected mayor and a unicameral city council of 28 members. Atsugi contributes three members to the Kanagawa Prefectural Assembly. In terms of national politics, the city is part of Kanagawa 16th district of the lower house of the Diet of Japan.

== Economy ==
Atsugi is mainly known as a bedroom community for the Tokyo-Yokohama metropolitan area. Nissan has operated a design center in Atsugi, Japan, since 1982. Sony operates the Atsugi Technology Center and the Atsugi Technology Center No. 2 in Atsugi. Anritsu is headquartered in Atsugi, as well as some of the NTT Research and Development labs.

== Education ==
Atsugi has 23 public elementary schools and 13 public middle schools operated by the city government. The city has six public high schools operated by the Kanagawa Prefectural Board of Education. There are also one private elementary school and two private high schools. Shoin University and the Kanagawa Institute of Technology are based in Atsugi, and the Tokyo Polytechnic University and the Tokyo University of Agriculture has campuses in the city

== Transportation ==
=== Railroad ===
Odakyu Electric Railway – Odakyū Odawara Line

- Hon-Atsugi - Aiko-Ishida

=== Highway ===
- Ken-Ō Expressway
- Tōmei Expressway, to Tokyo or Nagoya
- National Route 129, to Hiratsuka or Sagamihara
- National Route 246, to central Tokyo or Numazu
- National Route 271, to Odawara (toll)
- National Route 412, to Sagamiko

== Sister cities ==
- Abashiri, Hokkaidō, Japan, since February 5, 2005
- (South Korea) Gunpo, Gyeonggi-do, Republic of Korea, since February 5, 2005
- New Britain, Connecticut, United States, since May 31, 1983
- Yangzhou. Jiangsu, China, since October 23, 1984
- Yokote, Akita, Japan, since May 24, 1985

== Local attractions ==
- Iiyama Kannon (Chokokuji temple)
- Iiyama Onsen
- Mount Ōyama
- Nanasawa Onsen
- Nanasawa Forest Park

== Notable people from Atsugi ==
- Akira Amari, politician
- Ryo Germain, football player
- Tatsunori Hara, former baseball player, manager of Yomiuri Giants
- Takafumi Hori, football player and manager
- Miki Igarashi, guitarist of band Show-Ya
- Natsumi Kannou, football player
- Kyōko Koizumi, actress, singer
- Yurina Kumai, singer
- Nobuteru Maeda, vocalist
- Teruyuki Moniwa, football player
- Genki Nagasato, football player
- Emi Nakamura, singer, songwriter
- Yuki Nagasato, football player
- Azusa Senou, singer
- Madoka Sugai, ballet dancer
- Hitoshi Tamura, baseball player
- Hiroto Taniguchi, football player
- Kiyoe Yoshioka, singer, vocalist of Ikimonogakari
- Luna Nakagawa, vocalist, idol
