= Mount Tanzawa =

Mountain in Kanagawa Prefecture, Japan

- 丹沢山
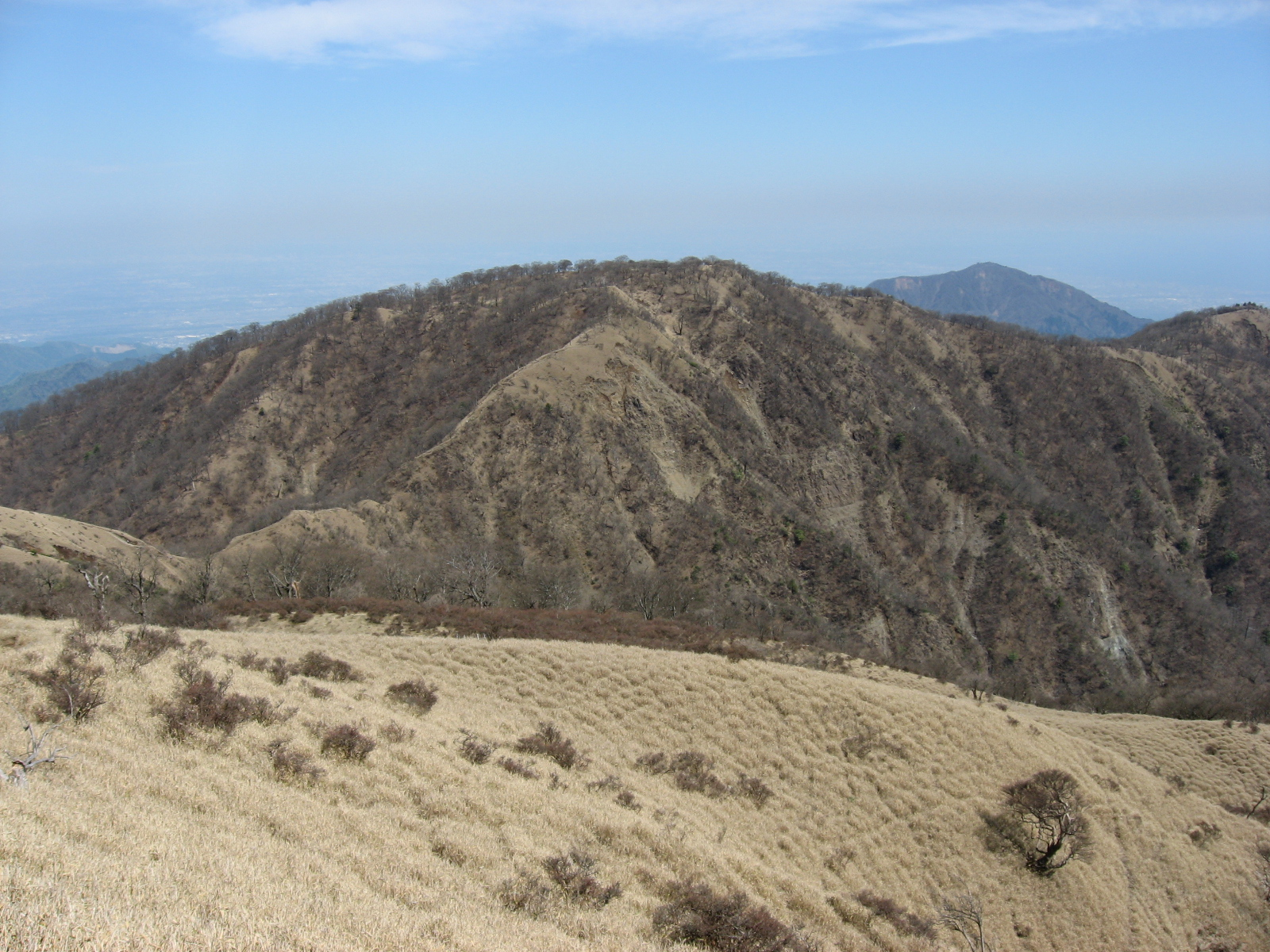
- View from Mount Fudō

Highest point
- Elevation: 1,567.1 m (5,141 ft)
- Prominence: 117 m (384 ft)
- Parent peak: Mount Hiru
- Listing: List of mountains and hills of Japan by height
- Coordinates: 35°28′27″N 139°9′46″E

Geography
- Location within Japan
- Location: Kanagawa Prefecture, Japan
- Parent range: Tanzawa Mountains
- Topo map(s): Geographical Survey Institute 25000:1 大山; 50000:1 東京山

Mount Tanzawa (丹沢山, Tanzawa-san, -yama) is a mountain of the Tanzawa Mountains, with an elevation of 1,567.1 metres (5,141 ft). Its summit marks the border between Sagamihara, Kiyokawa in Aikō District, and Yamakita in Ashigarakami District.

== Gallery ==
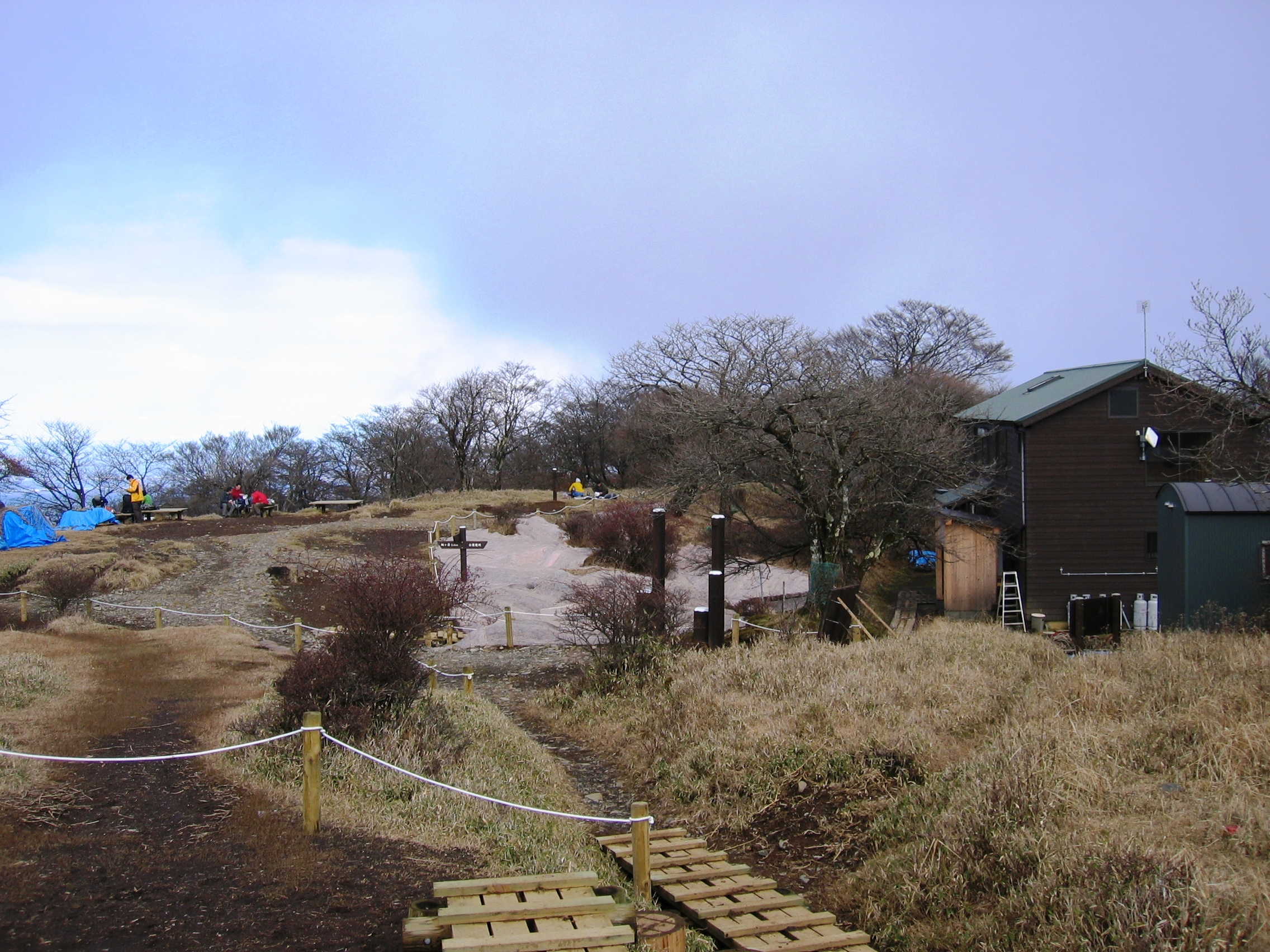
The top of Mount Tanzawa

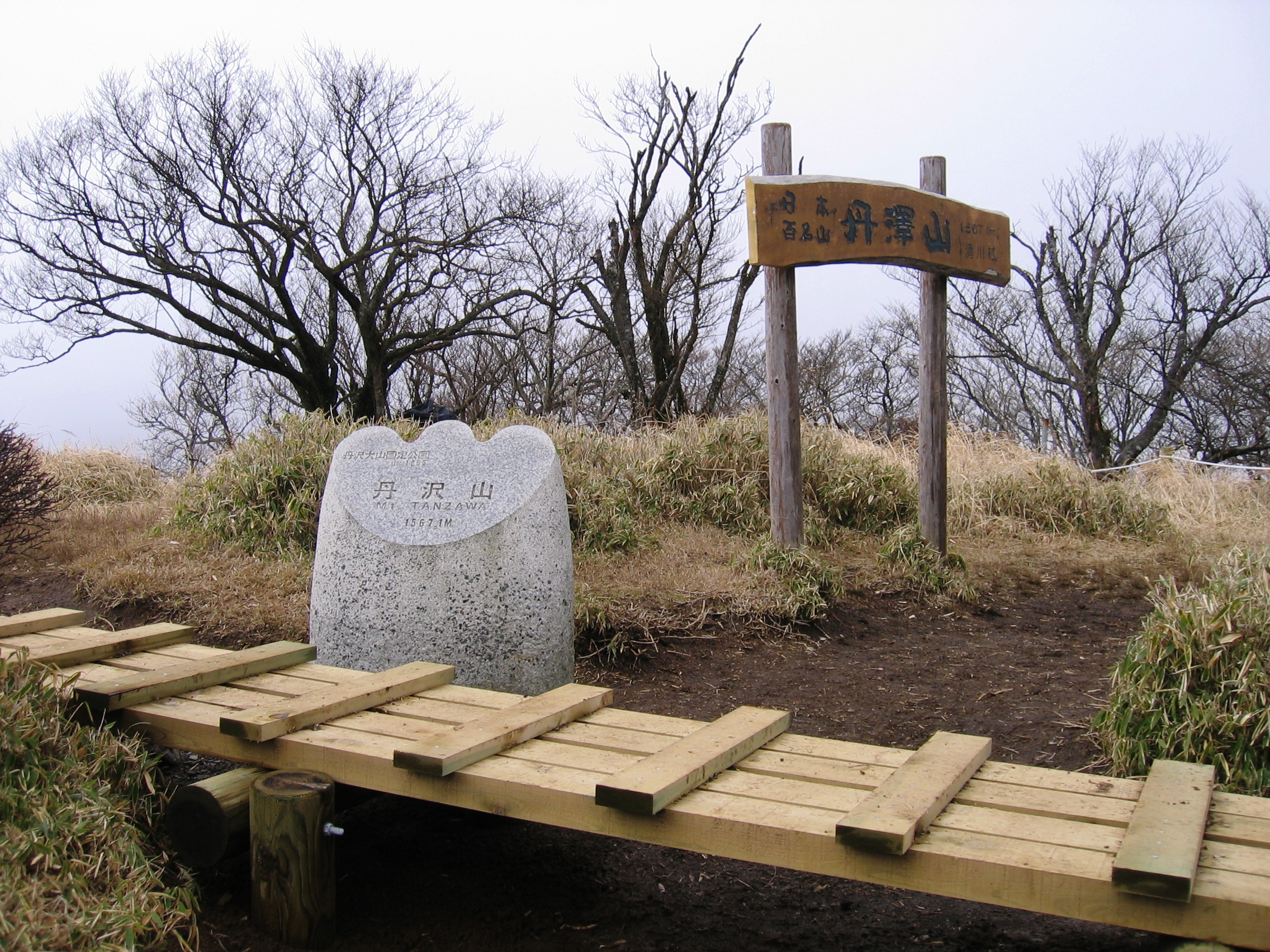
The top of Mount Tanzawa

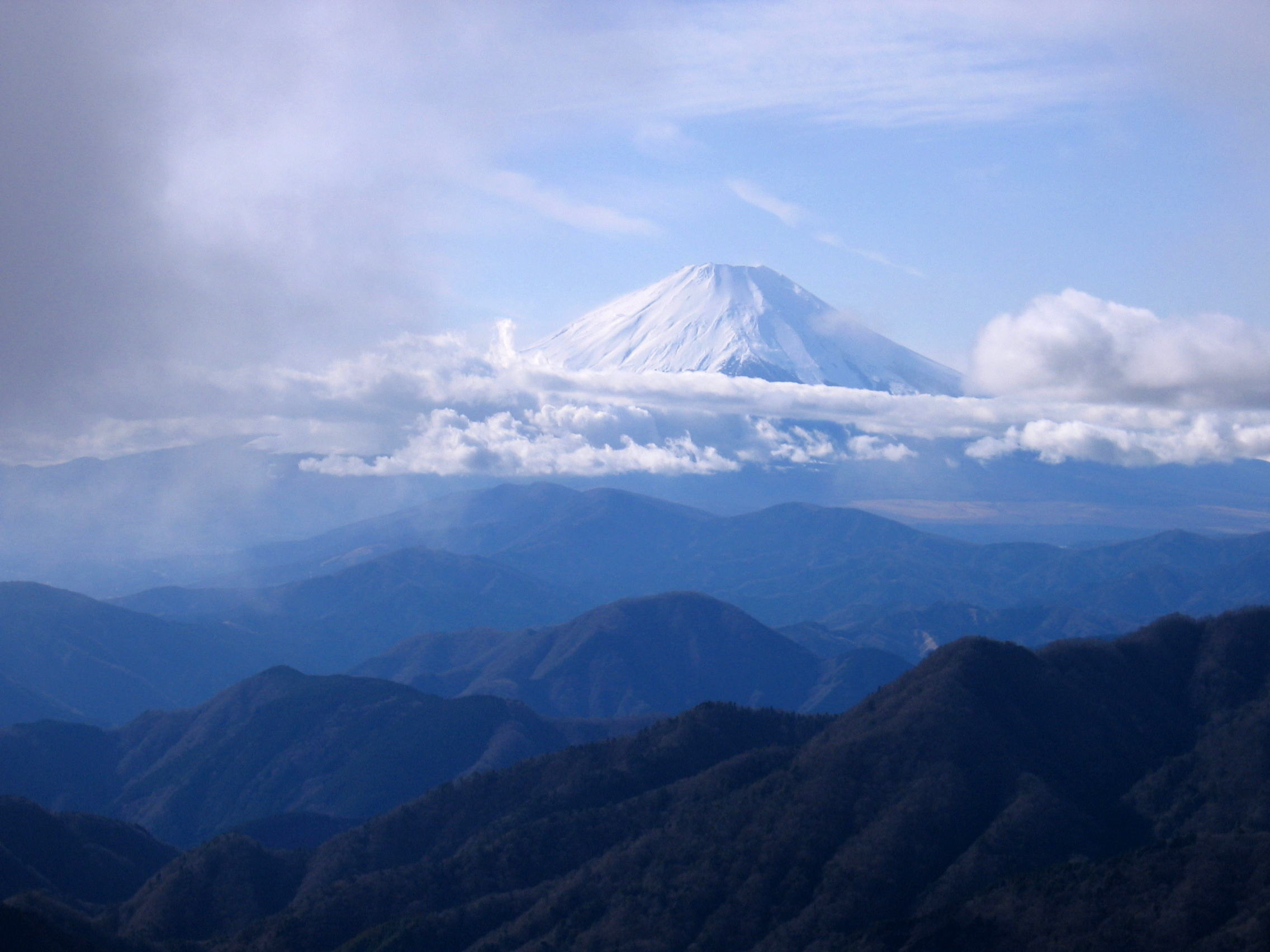
Mount Fuji from Mount Tanzawa

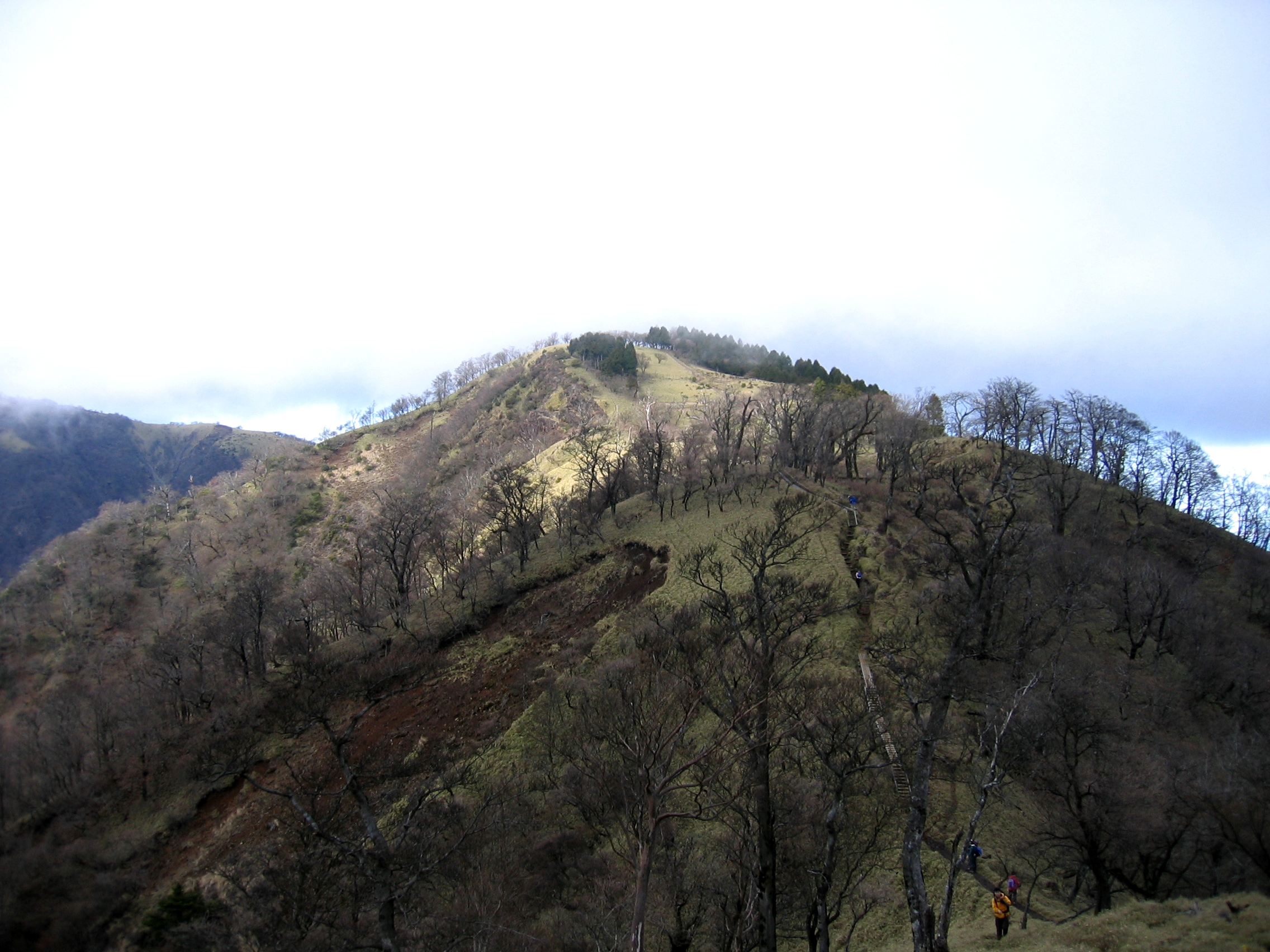
Mount Tanzawa from south

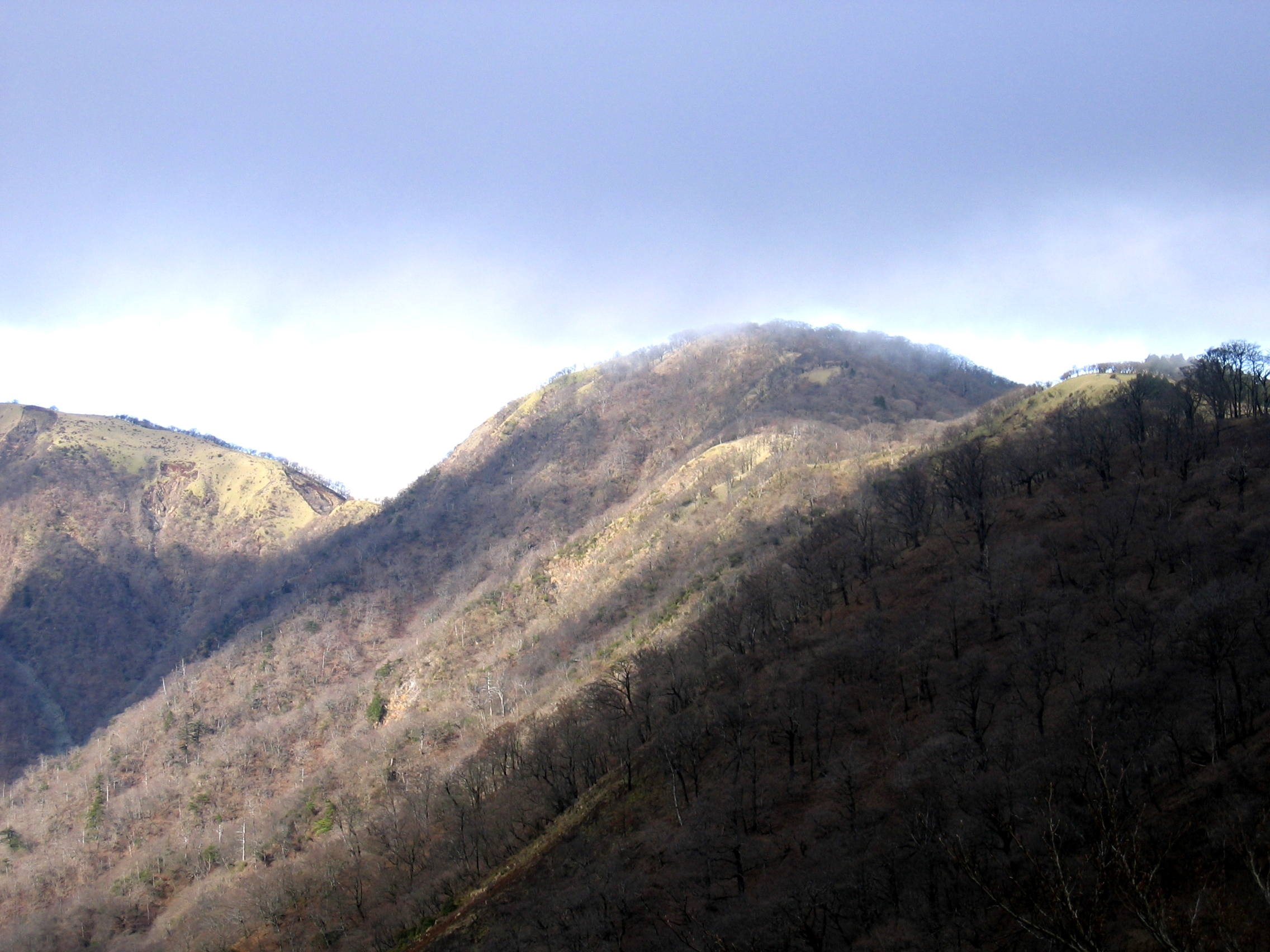
Mount Tanzawa from Mount Tō

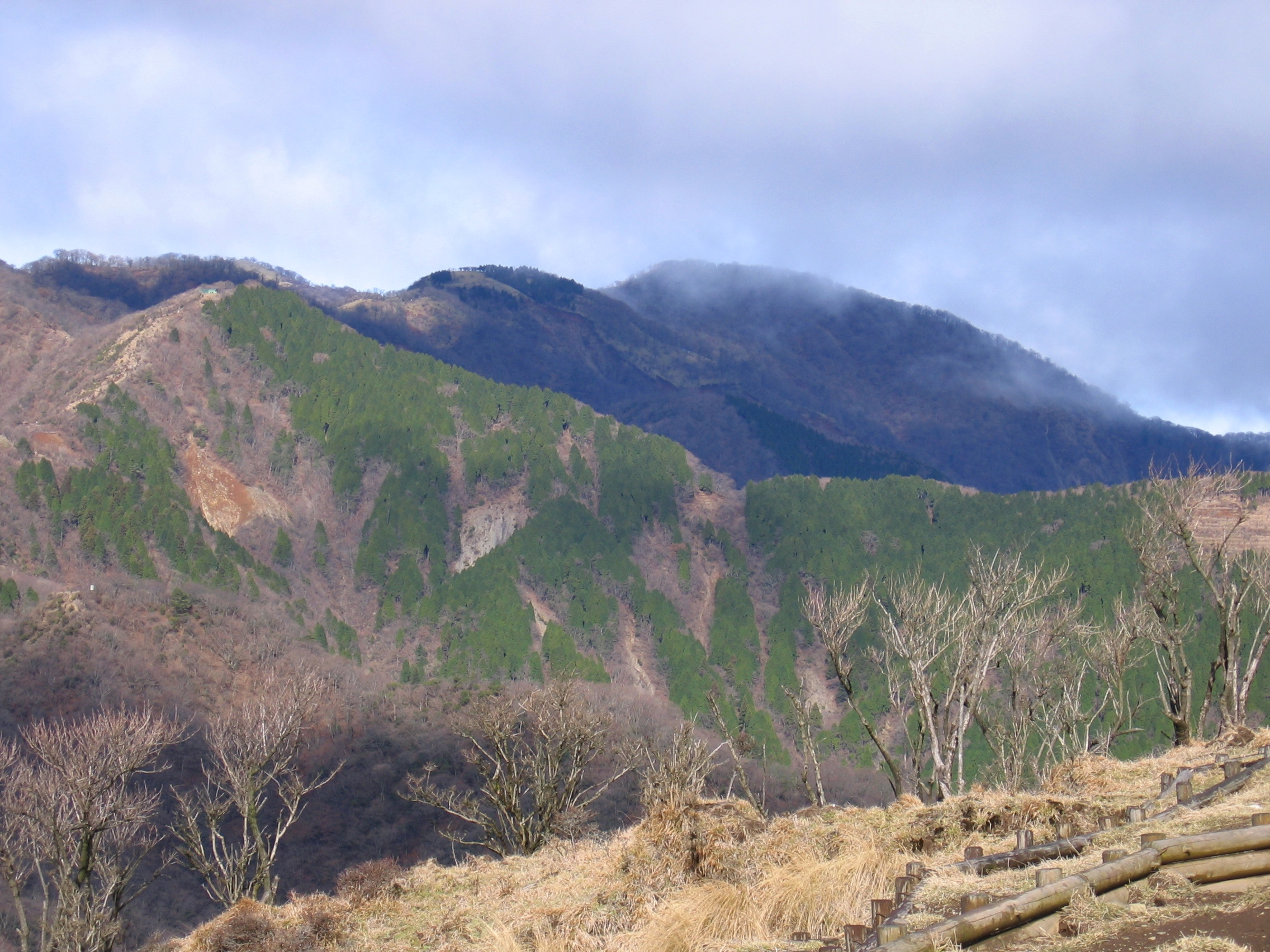
Mount Tanzawa from Mount Sannotō

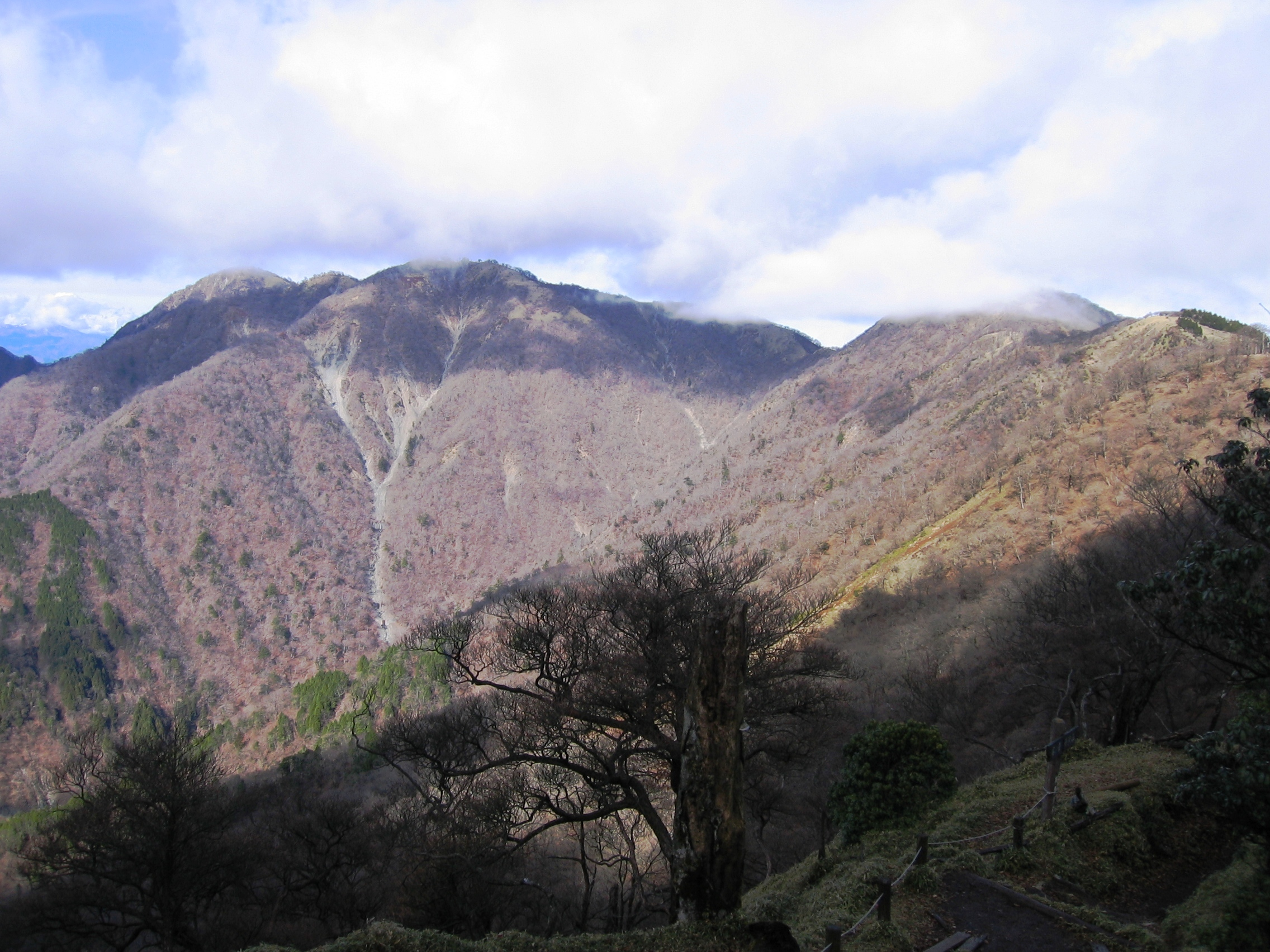
Mount Hiru, Mount Fudō and Mount Tanzawa from Mount Tō
