= Lake Miyagase =

Lake Miyagase 宮ヶ瀬湖
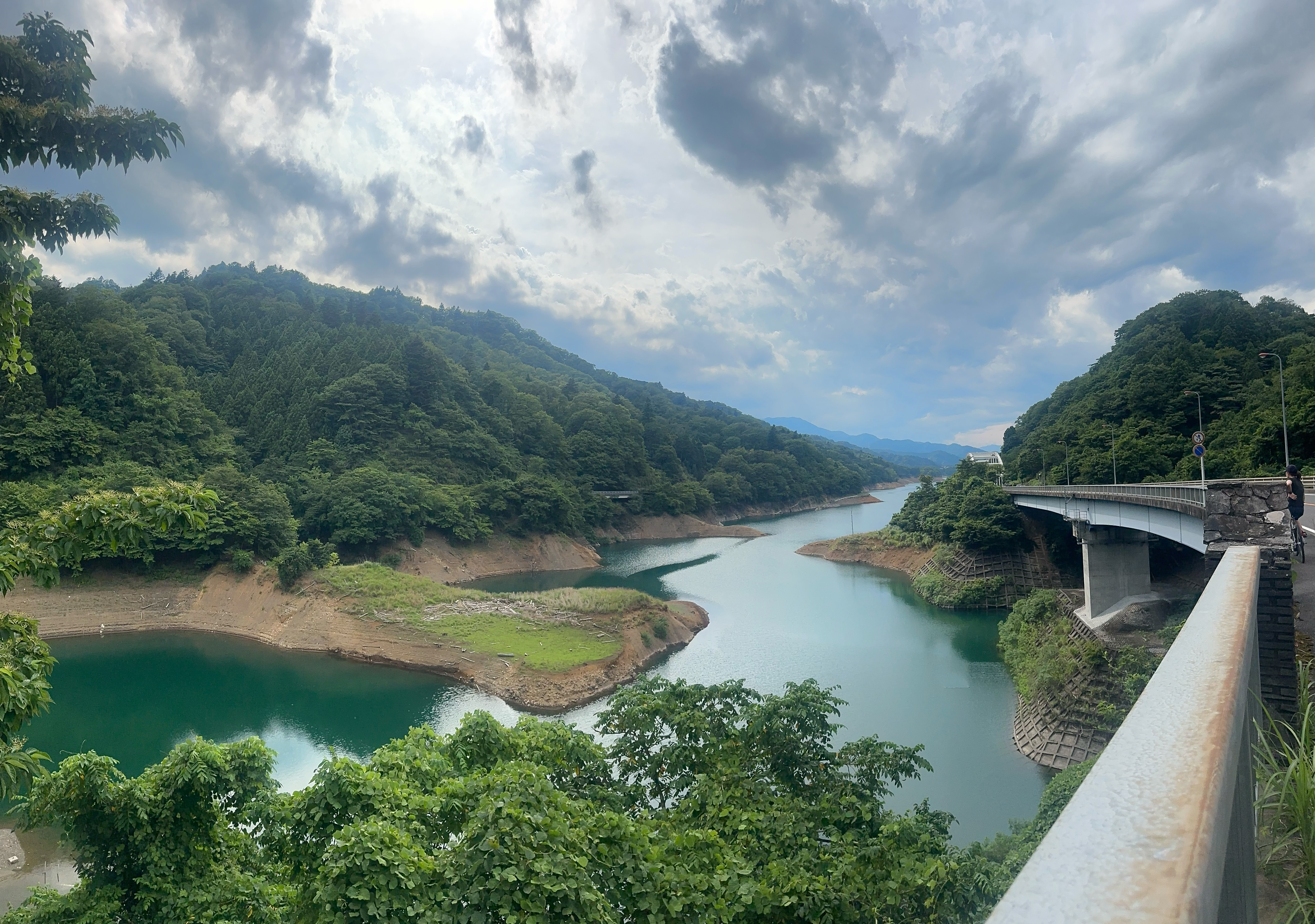

- Location within Kanagawa Prefecture
- Location: Aiko District, Kanagawa
- Coordinates: 35.52953°N 139.229°E
- Type: reservoir
- Primary inflows: Nakatsu River, Hayata River
- Primary outflows: Nakatsu River
- Basin countries: Japan
- Max. length: 5.68 km (3.53 mi)
- Max. width: 1.07 km (0.66 mi)
- Surface area: 4.60 km^{2} (1.78 sq mi)
- Water volume: 0.193 km^{3} (156,000 acre⋅ft)
- Settlements: Aikawa, Kanagawa

Lake Miyagase (宮ヶ瀬湖) is a lake within the Aiko District of Kanagawa, Japan, located between Sagamihara and Atsugi. The lake offers views of Tanzawa Mountains, including Mount Hiru. The lake is a man-made reservoir and formed by the Miyagase Dam, and is a source of drinking water for Yokohama and Tokyo.

== Gallery ==
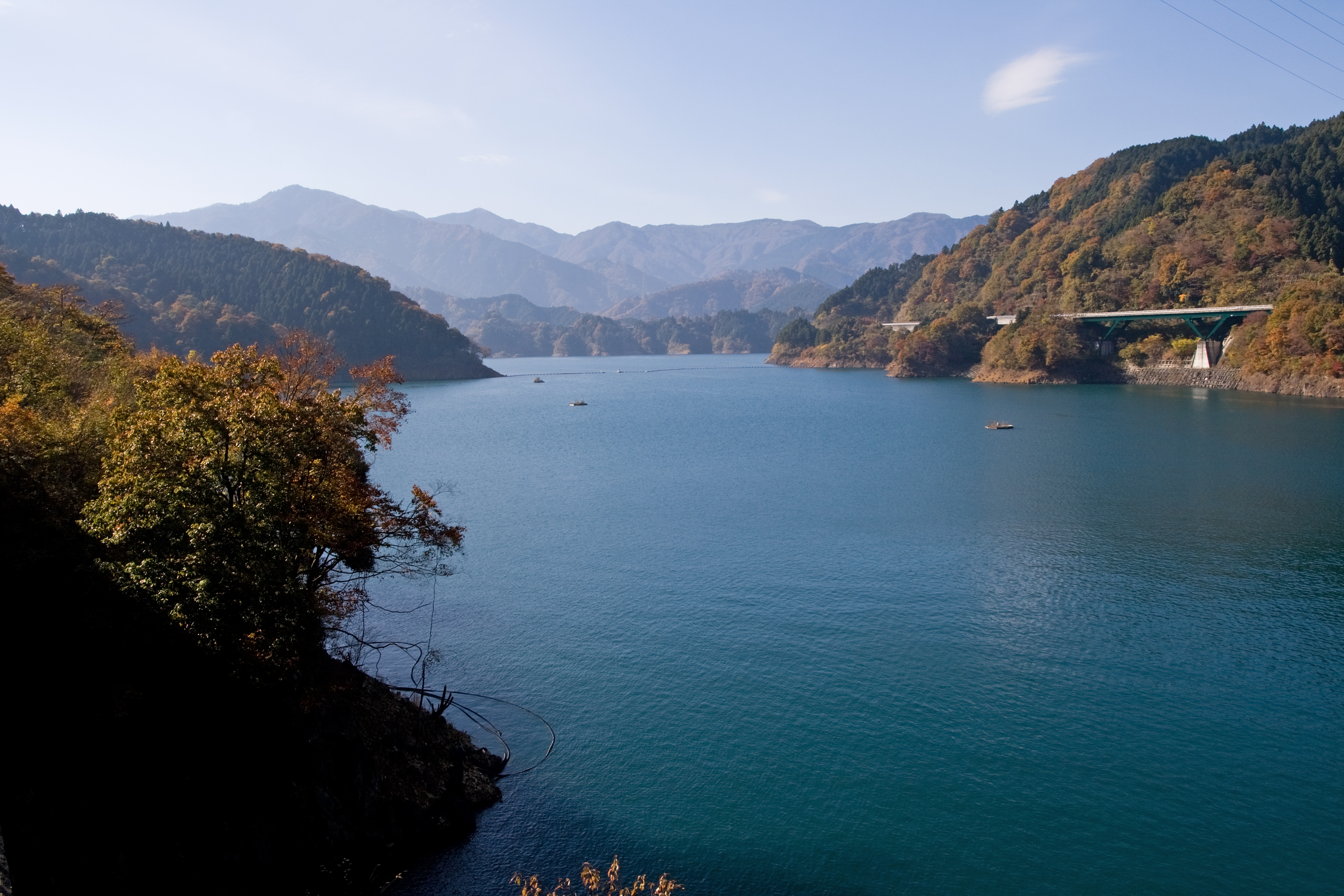

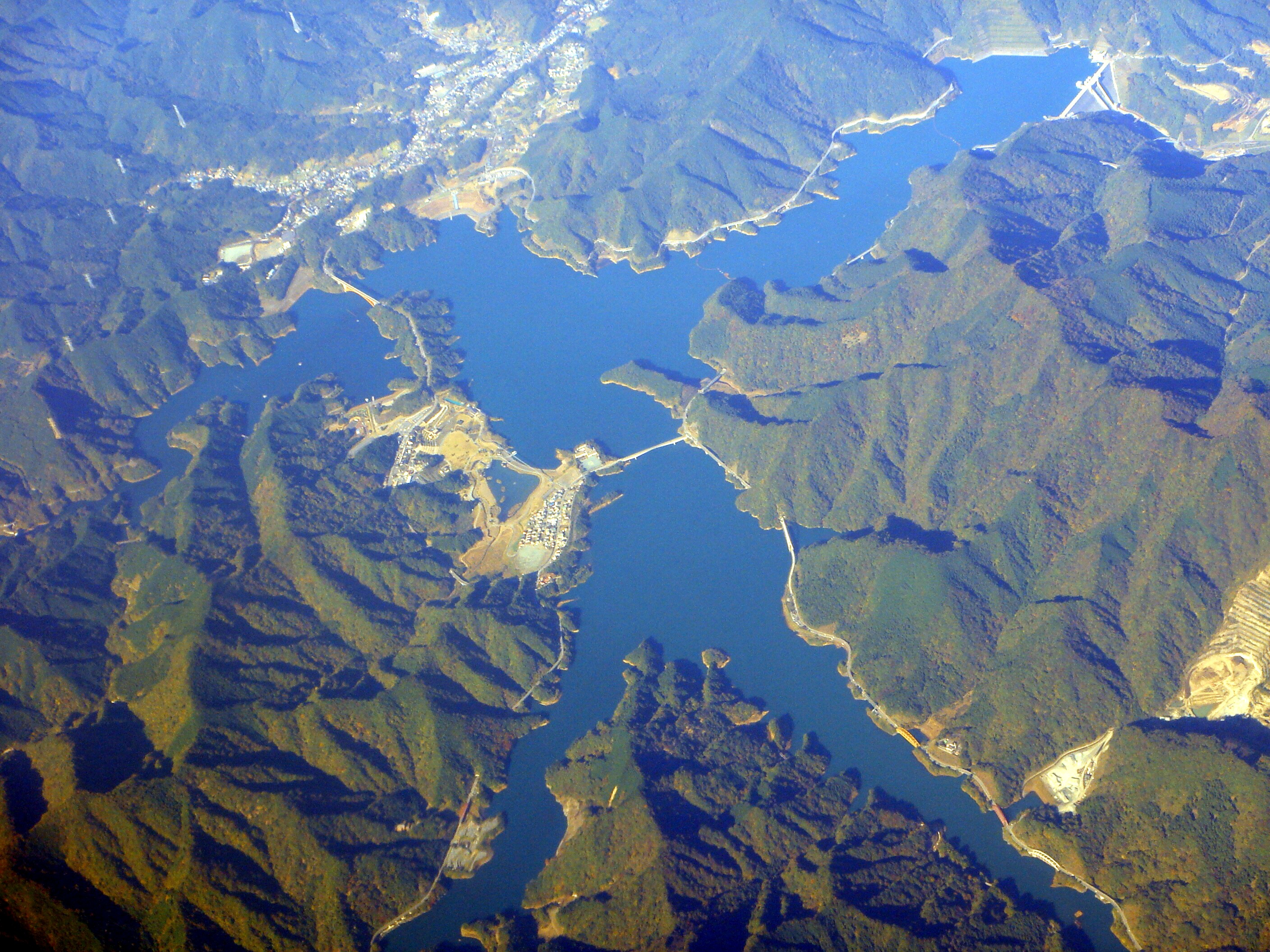
