= Mount Shindainichi =

Mountain in Japan

- 新大日
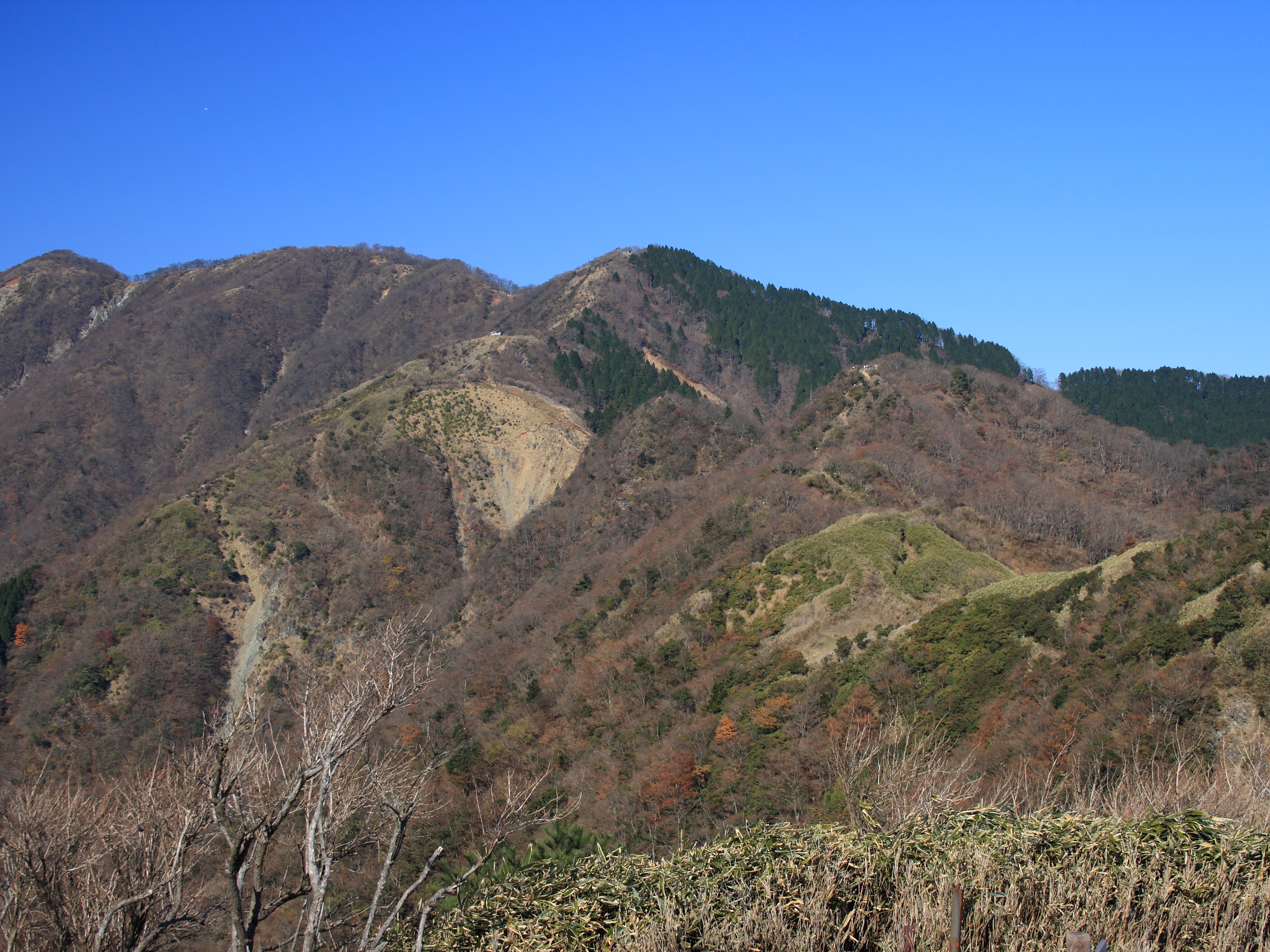
- Mt.Shindainichi from Mt.Karasuo

Highest point
- Elevation: 1,340 m (4,400 ft)
- Coordinates: 35°27′05″N 139°10′36″E

Geography
- Location: Kanagawa, Japan
- Parent range: Tanzawa Mountains

Climbing
- First ascent: unknown
- Easiest route: Hike

Mount Shindainichi (新大日) is a peak of the Tanzawa Mountains with an elevation of 1,340 metres (4,396 ft), and is located due east of Mount Tō. It is located within the boundary of the Tanzawa-Ōyama Quasi-National Park.

The mountain is easily accessible by a hiking trail from Yabitsu Pass, which intersects with the Nagaone Trail from the village of Kiyokawa, and with the trail leading directly to Mount Tō which is approximately a 40-minute hike.

== Gallery ==
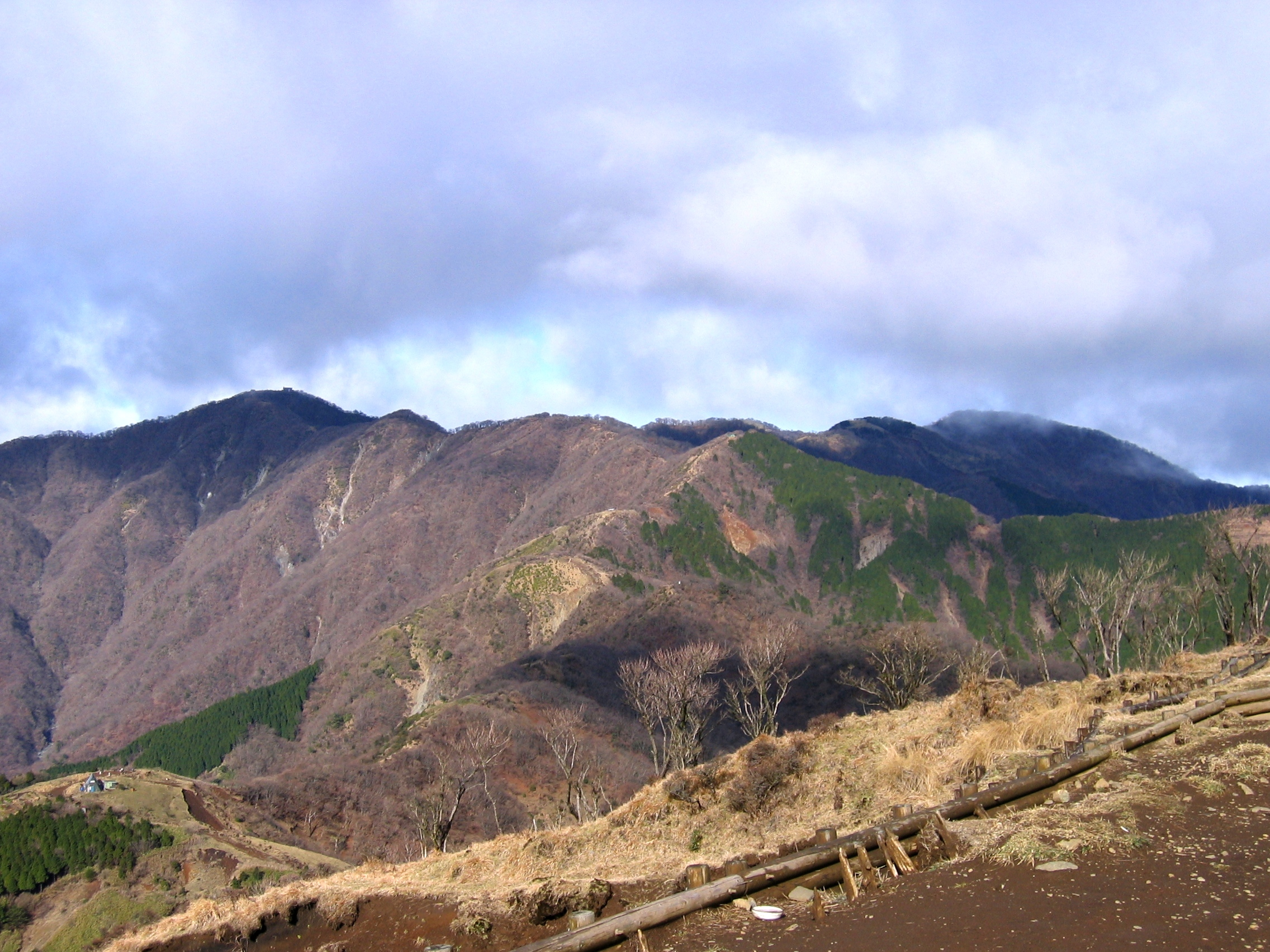
Mount To, Mount Shindainichi and Mount Tanzawa from Mount Sannoto

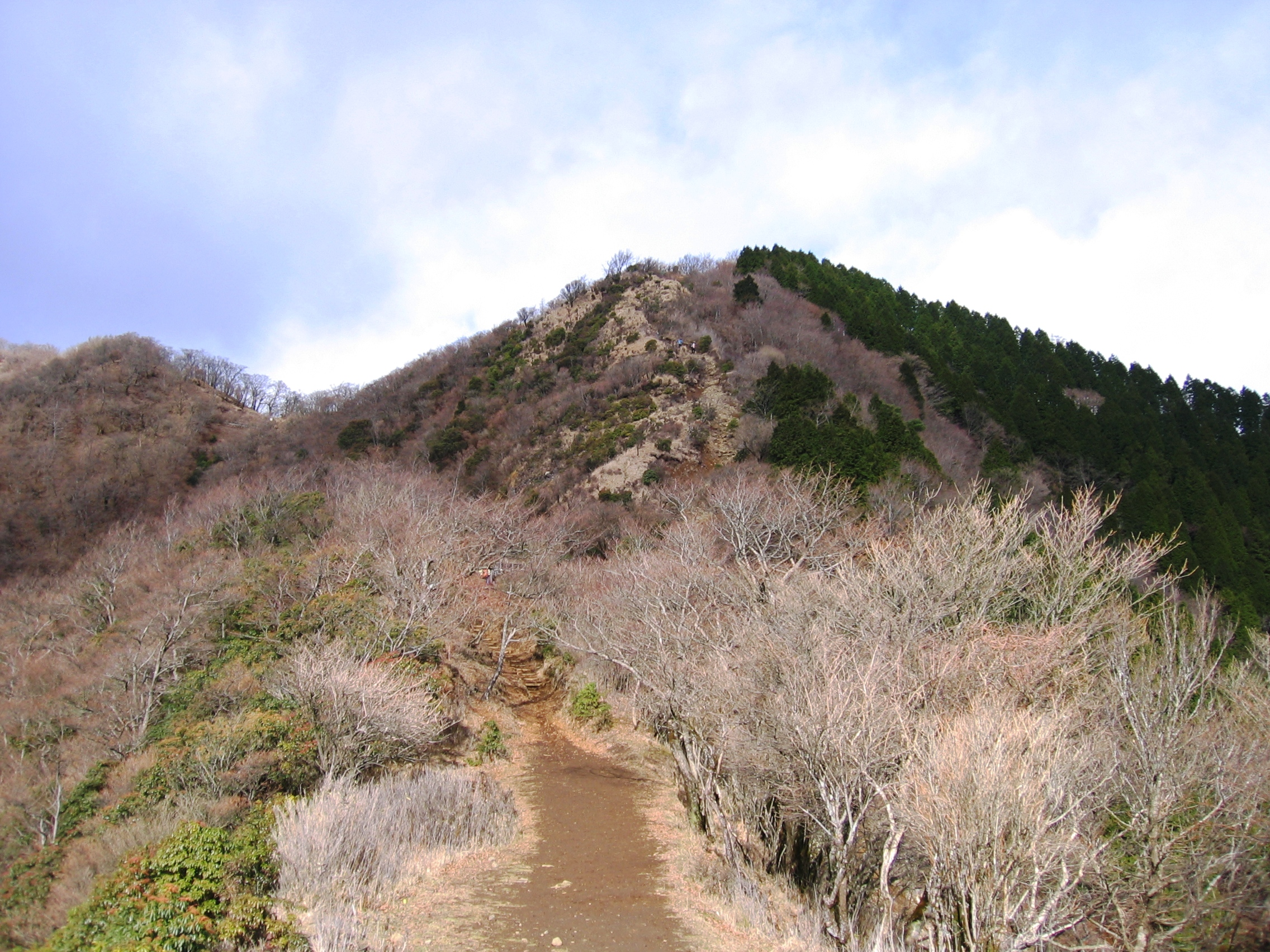
Mount Shindainichi from Mount Gyoja

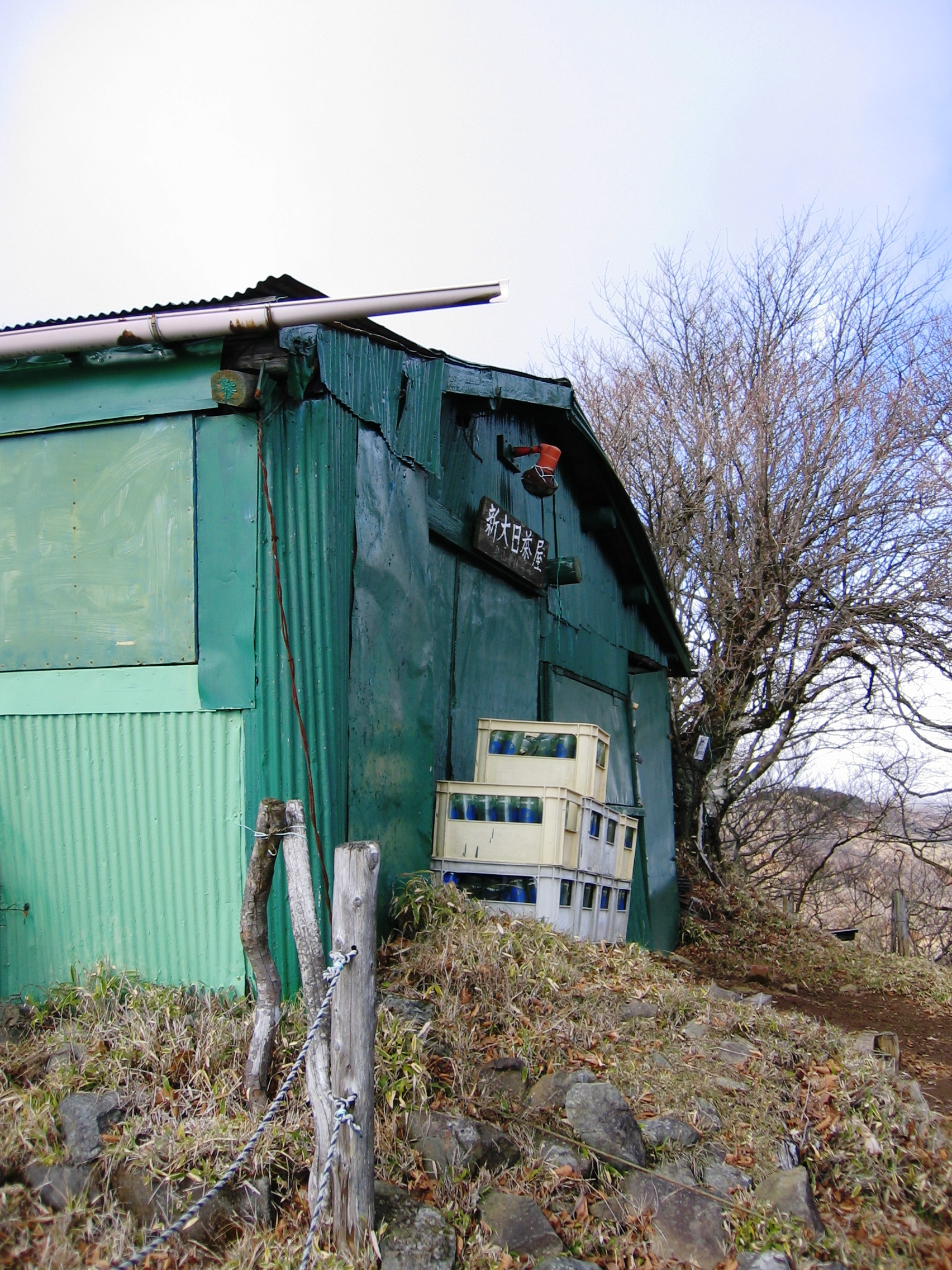
A hut on the top of Mount Shindainichi

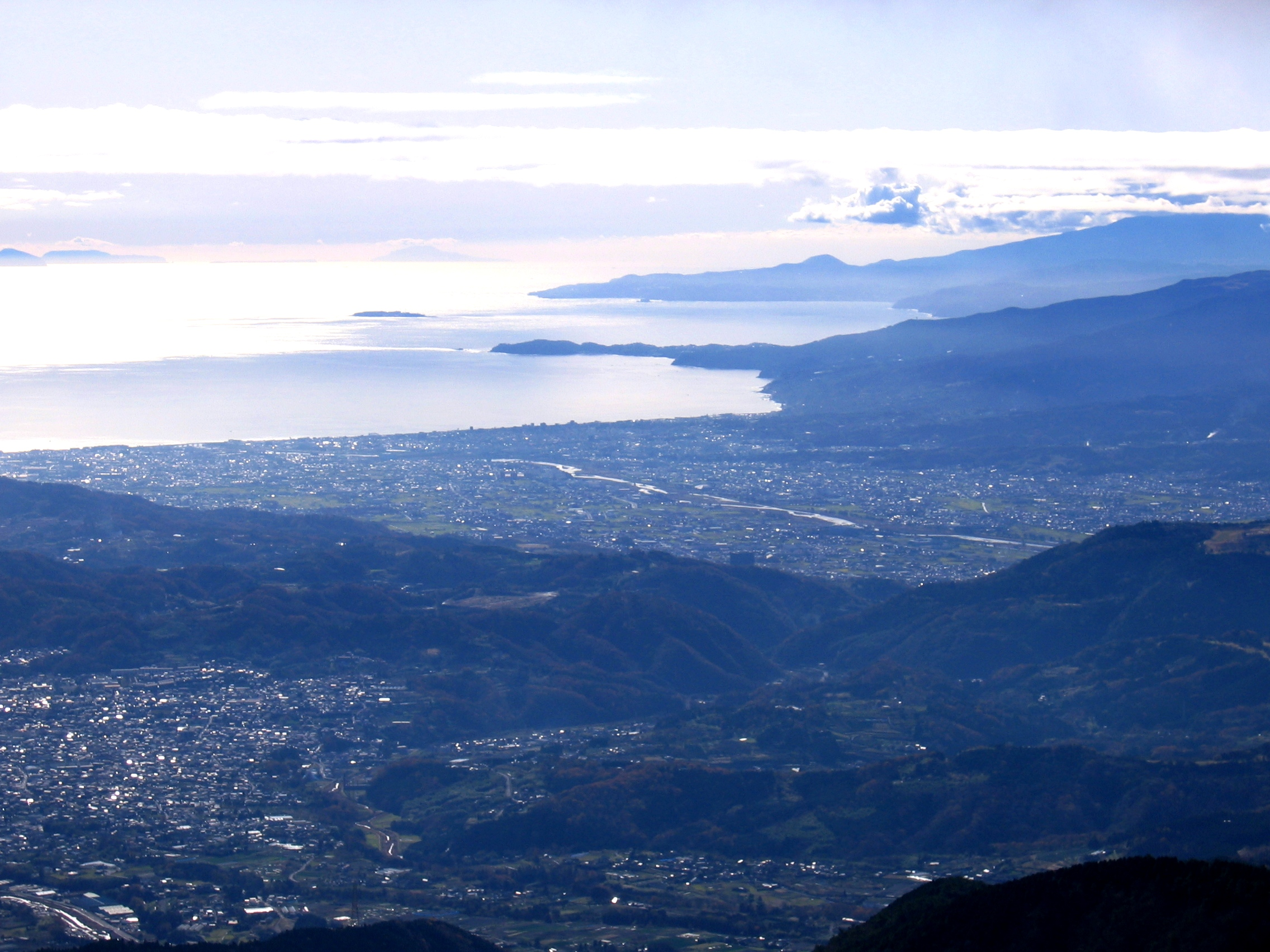
Odawara City and Izu Peninsula from Mount Shindainichi
