= Miyagase Dam =

Dam in Kanagawa Prefecture, Japan

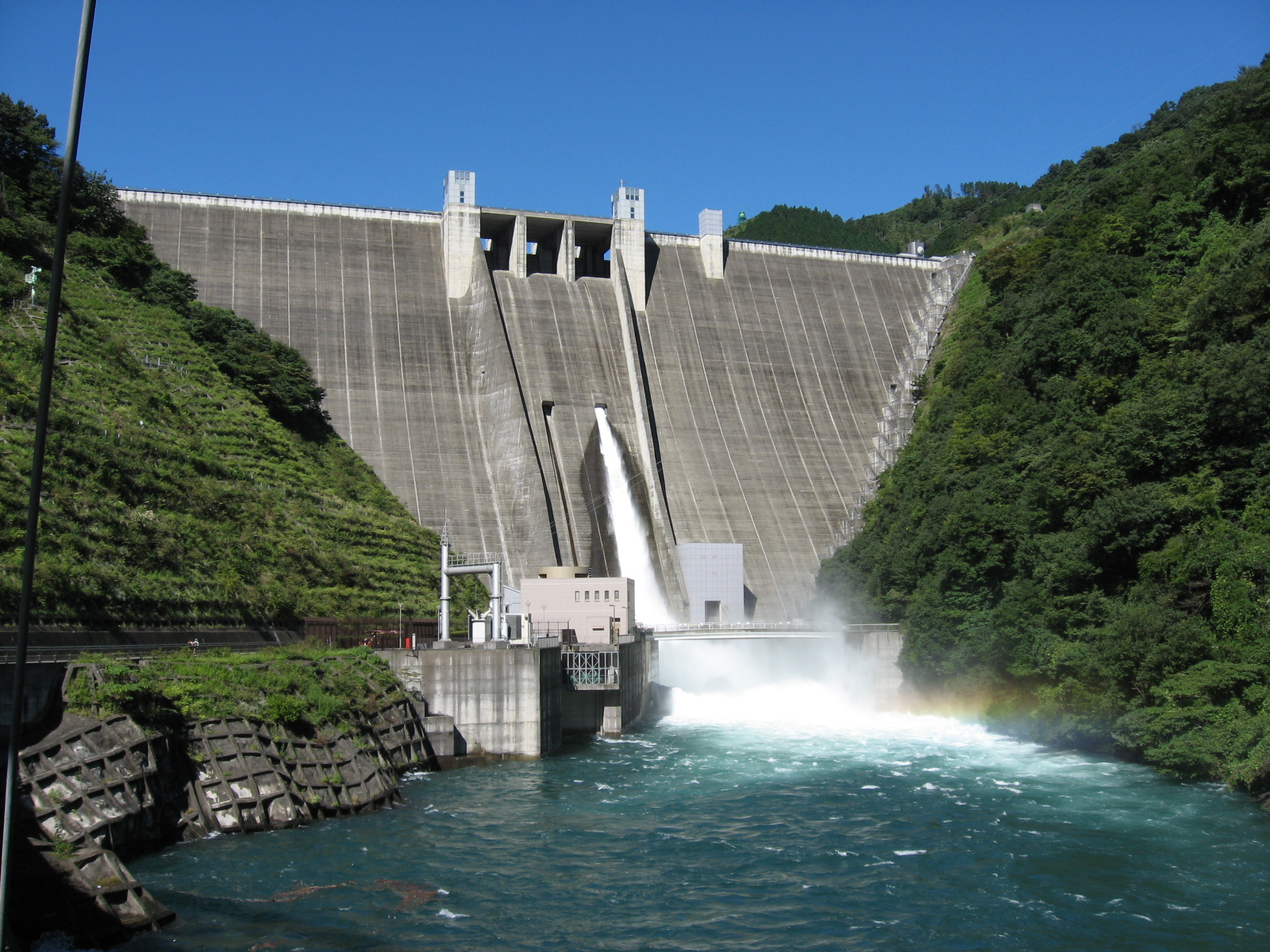
- Interactive map of Miyagase Dam
- Official name: 宮ヶ瀬ダム
- Location: Kanagawa Prefecture, Japan
- Coordinates: 35°32′32″N 139°14′57.6″E
- Construction began: 1971
- Opening date: 2000
- Operator: Ministry of Land, Infrastructure, Transport and Tourism (Japan)

Dam and spillways
- Type of dam: Gravity
- Impounds: Nakatsu River
- Height: 156 m (512 ft)
- Length: 400 m (1,300 ft)

Reservoir
- Creates: Lake Miyagase
- Total capacity: 193,000,000 m^{3} (6.8×10^{9} cu ft)
- Catchment area: 213.9 km^{2} (82.6 sq mi)
- Surface area: 460 hectares

The Miyagase Dam (宮ヶ瀬ダム, Miyagase damu) is a dam on the Nakatsu River, a main tributary of the Sagami River in Aikō District, Kanagawa Prefecture, Japan. It straddles the border between the village of Kiyokawa, town of Aikawa and the former town of Tsukui (now part of the city of Sagamihara).

== History ==
The potential of the Sagami River for hydroelectric power development began to be developed in the 1930s, with the growth of industry and electrical consumption in the Yokohama-Kanagawa industrial belt. Work on the Sagami Dam, the first dam on the main stream of the Sagami River began in 1938; however, lack of funding and the advent of World War II delayed completion until after the end of the war. Work on the Shiroyama Dam was completed in 1965. The growth in population of nearby Atsugi and increased need for industrial and drinking water spurred plans for additional dams on the Sagami River's tributaries. Plans for the Miyagase Dam were finalized in 1969 with work commencing in 1971. Due to the huge size of the dam, and the need relocate some 300 households from the area flooded by the dam, construction was not completed until the year 2000.

== Design ==
The Miyagase Dam is a hollow-core concrete gravity dam. It was designed and built by a consortium of the Kajima Construction, Obayashi Corp. and the Toda Corporation. The dam was designed as a multi-purpose dam. In addition to providing flood control, it provides 90% of the tap water to two-thirds of the population of Kanagawa Prefecture, including the cities of Kawasaki, Yokohama and Yokosuka. It also provides water to the associated Aikawa Hydroelectric Power Plant, which has a rated capacity of 24,000 KW of power.

The 156 metres (512 ft) tall dam is the second tallest in the Kantō region. Miyagase Dam is the highest and the largest roller-compacted concrete dam in Japan.

The reservoir created by the dam, Lake Miyagase (宮ヶ瀬湖, Miyagase-ko) is a popular recreation spot in Kanagawa Prefecture.

== Surroundings ==
Public access to the dam and its lake is provided by National Route 412.
