= Mount Tō =

Mountain in Japan

- 塔ノ岳
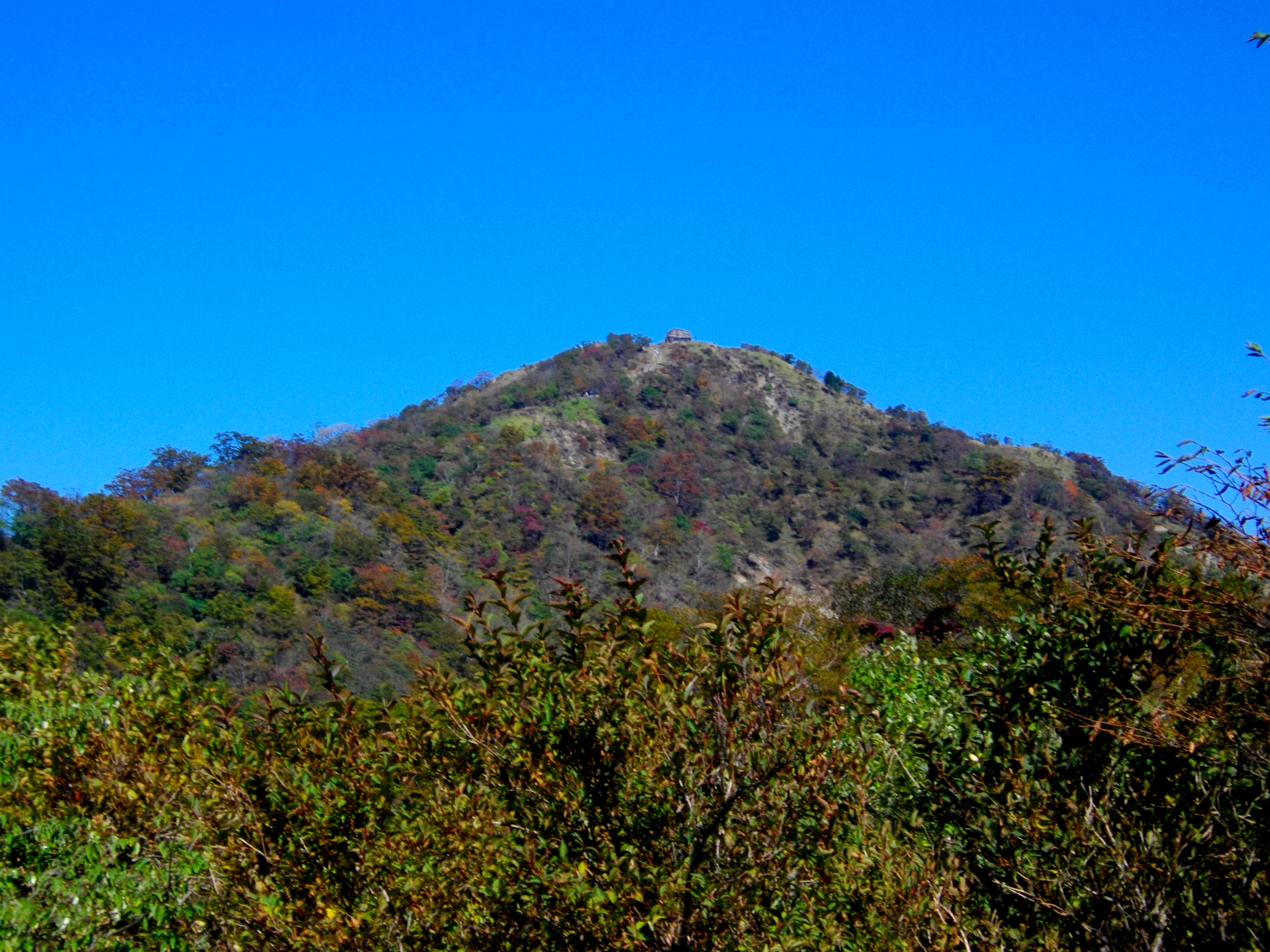
- Mount Tō from Mount Maru

Highest point
- Elevation: 1,490.9 m (4,891 ft)
- Coordinates: 35°27′N 139°9′E

Naming
- Language of name: Japanese
- Pronunciation: [toːnodake]

Geography
- Location: On the border of Kiyokawa, Hadano and Yamakita in Kanagawa, Japan
- Parent range: Tanzawa Mountains

Mount Tō (塔ノ岳, Tō-no-dake) is a 1,490.9 m (4,891 ft) mountain of Tanzawa Mountains, located on the border of Kiyokawa, Hadano and Yamakita in Kanagawa, Japan.

== Outline ==
Mount Tō is one of the most popular mountains in Tanzawa Mountains. This mountain is a part of Tanzawa-Ōyama Quasi-National Park with other Tanzawa Mountains.

== Access ==
- Ōkura Bus Stop of Kanagawa Chūō Bus

== Gallery ==
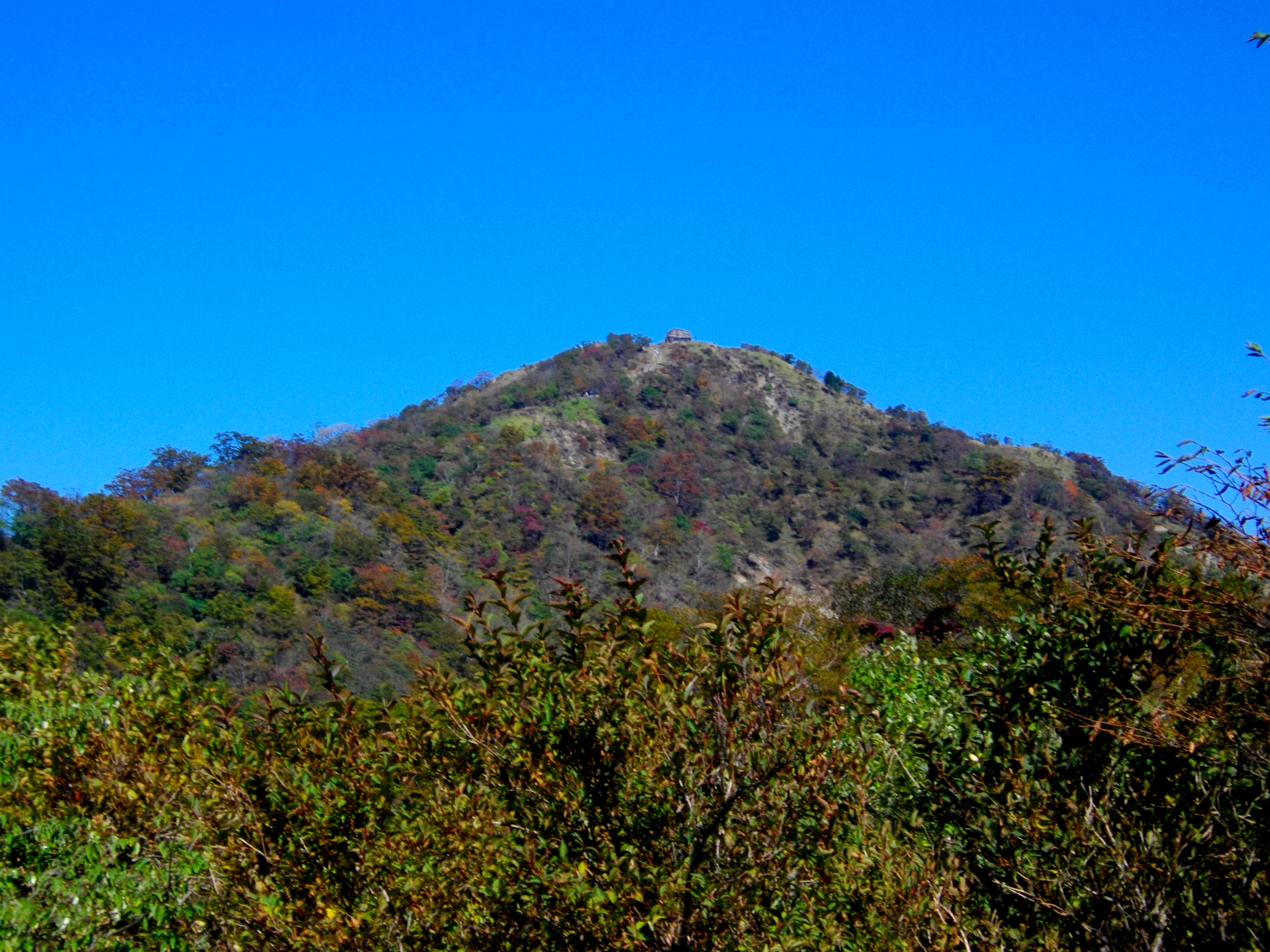
Mount Tō from Ōkura-one (10/2008)

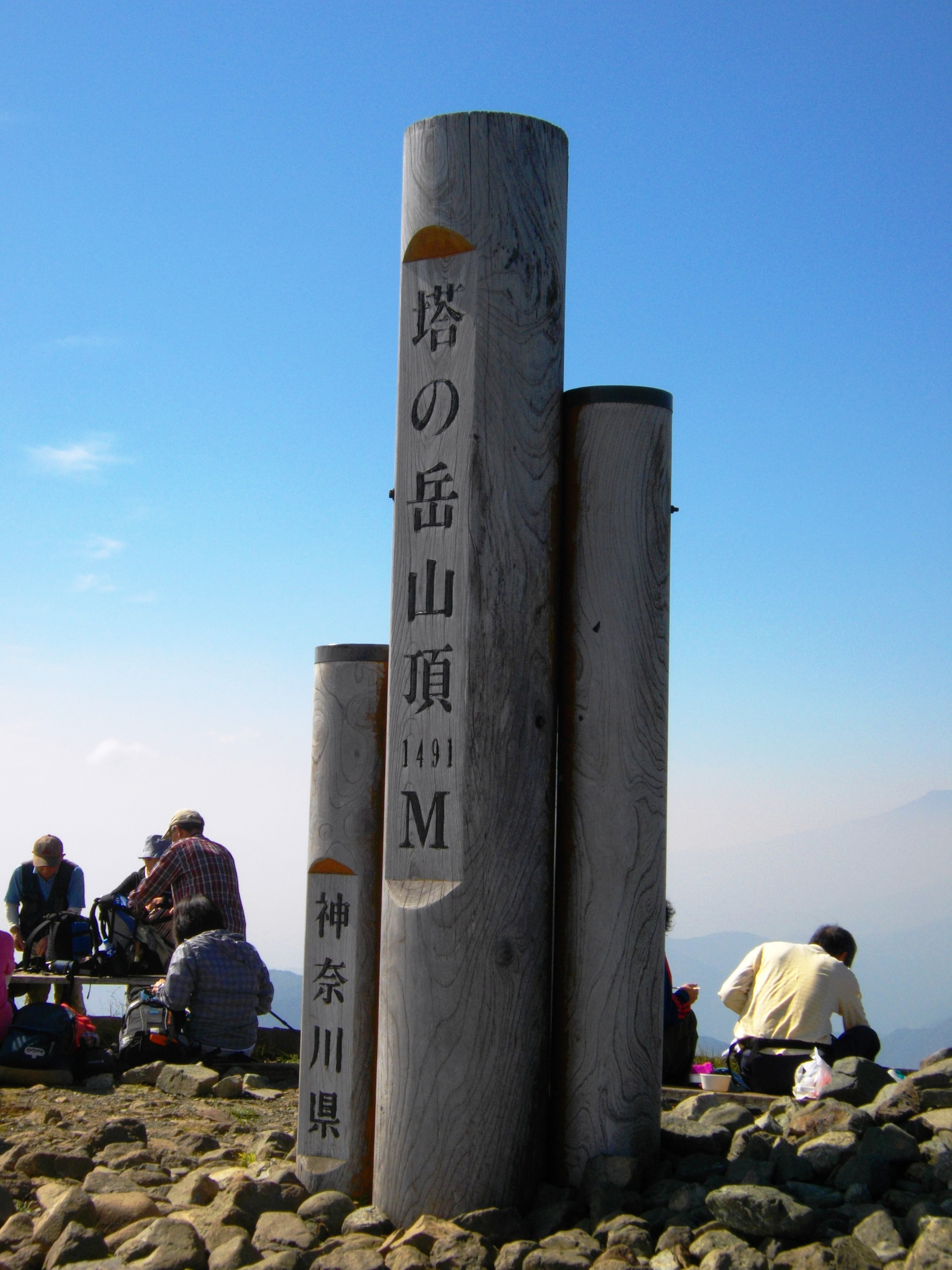
At the top of Mount Tō (10/2008)

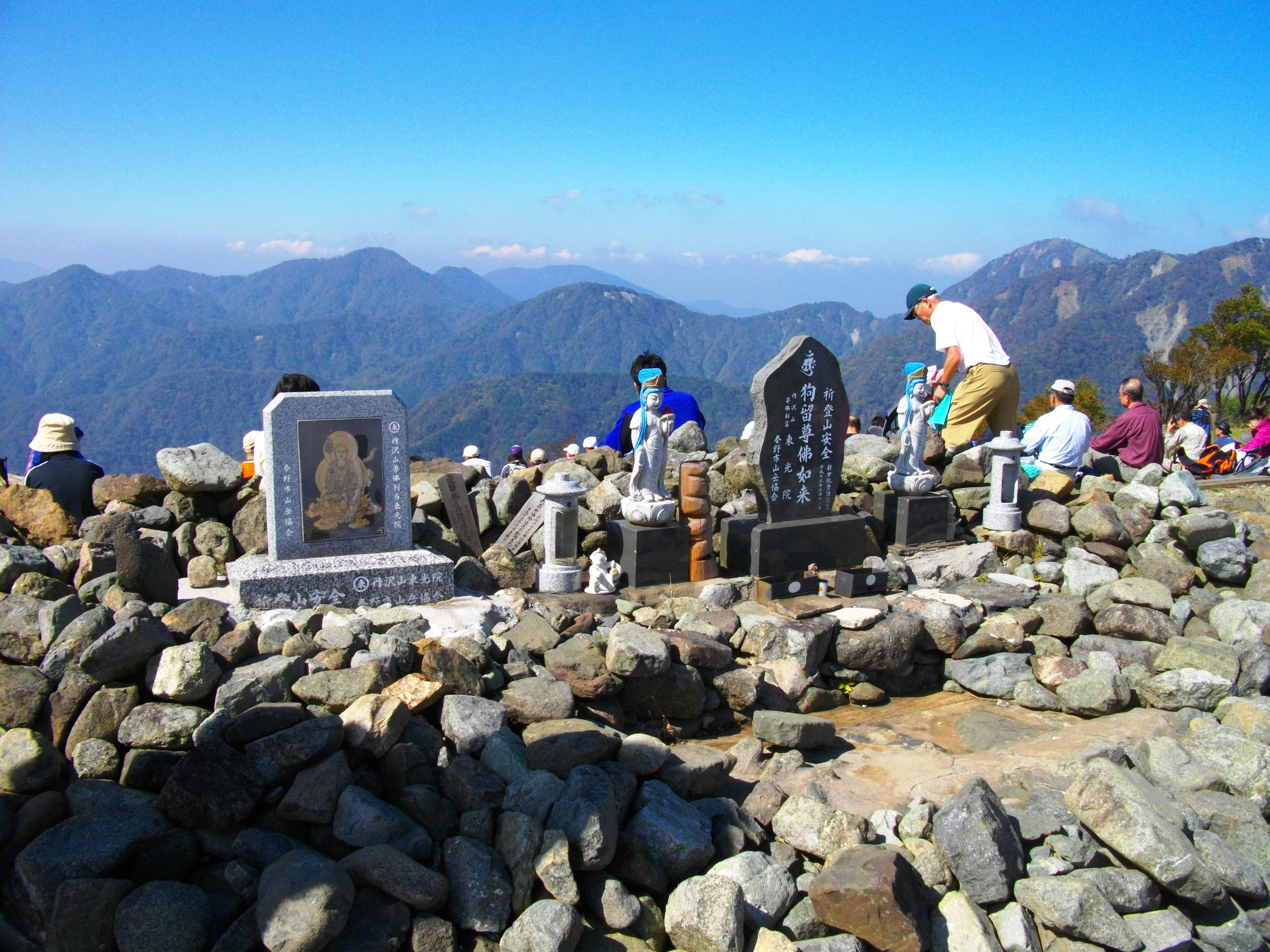
Religious objects at the top of Mount Tō (10/2008)

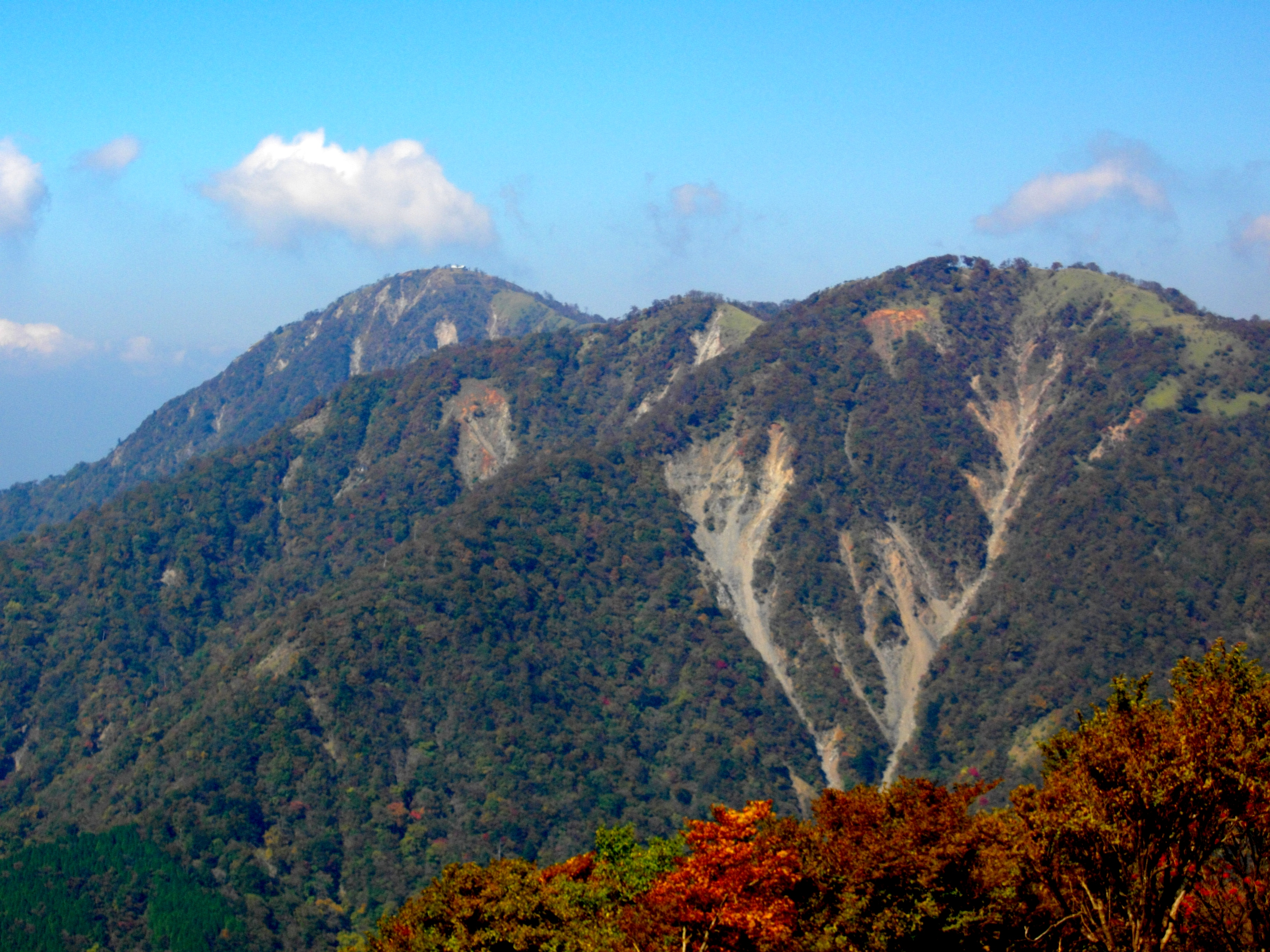
Mount Hiru and Mount Fudō from Mount Tō (10/2008)

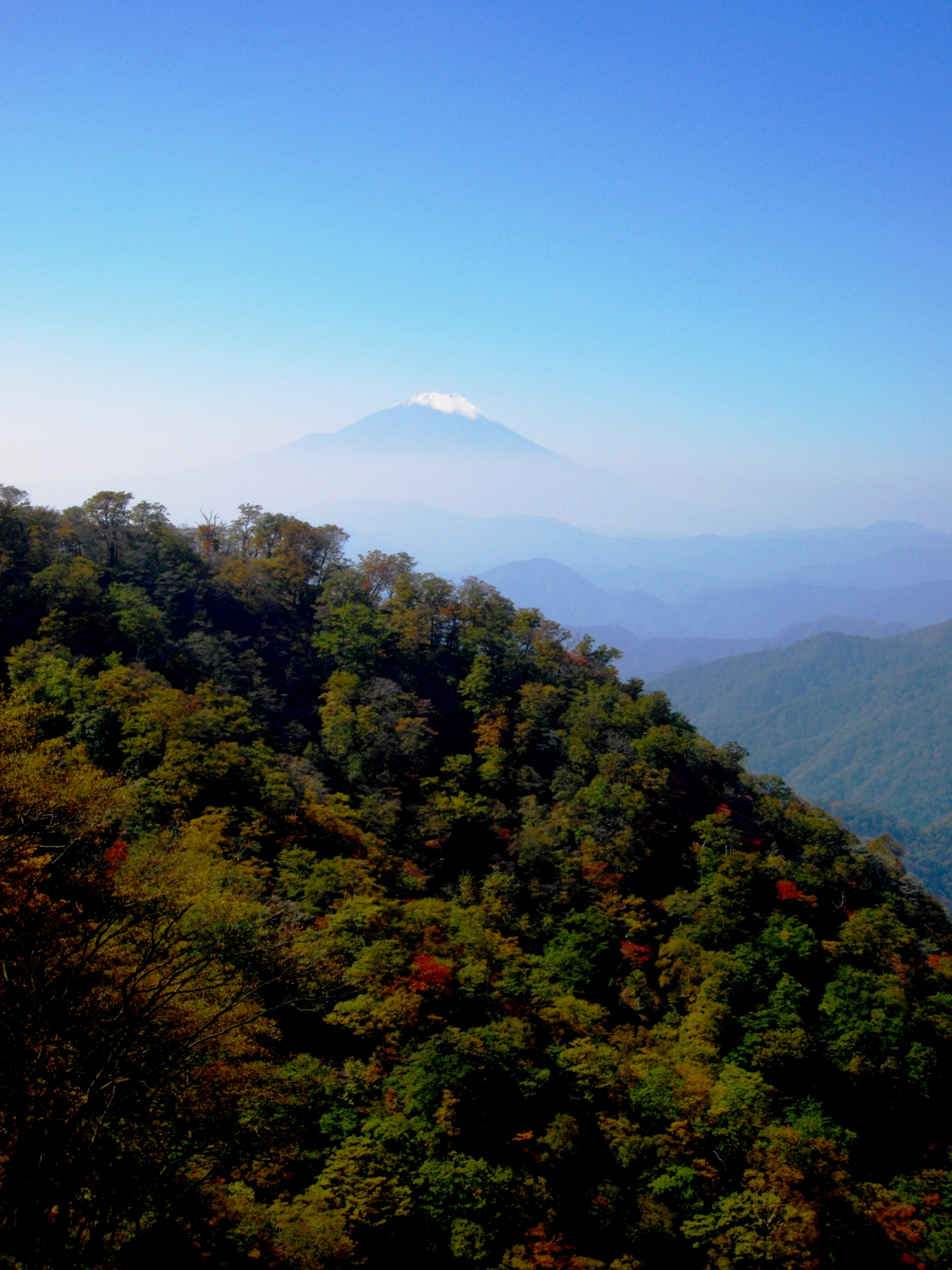
Mount Fuji from Mount Tō (10/2008)

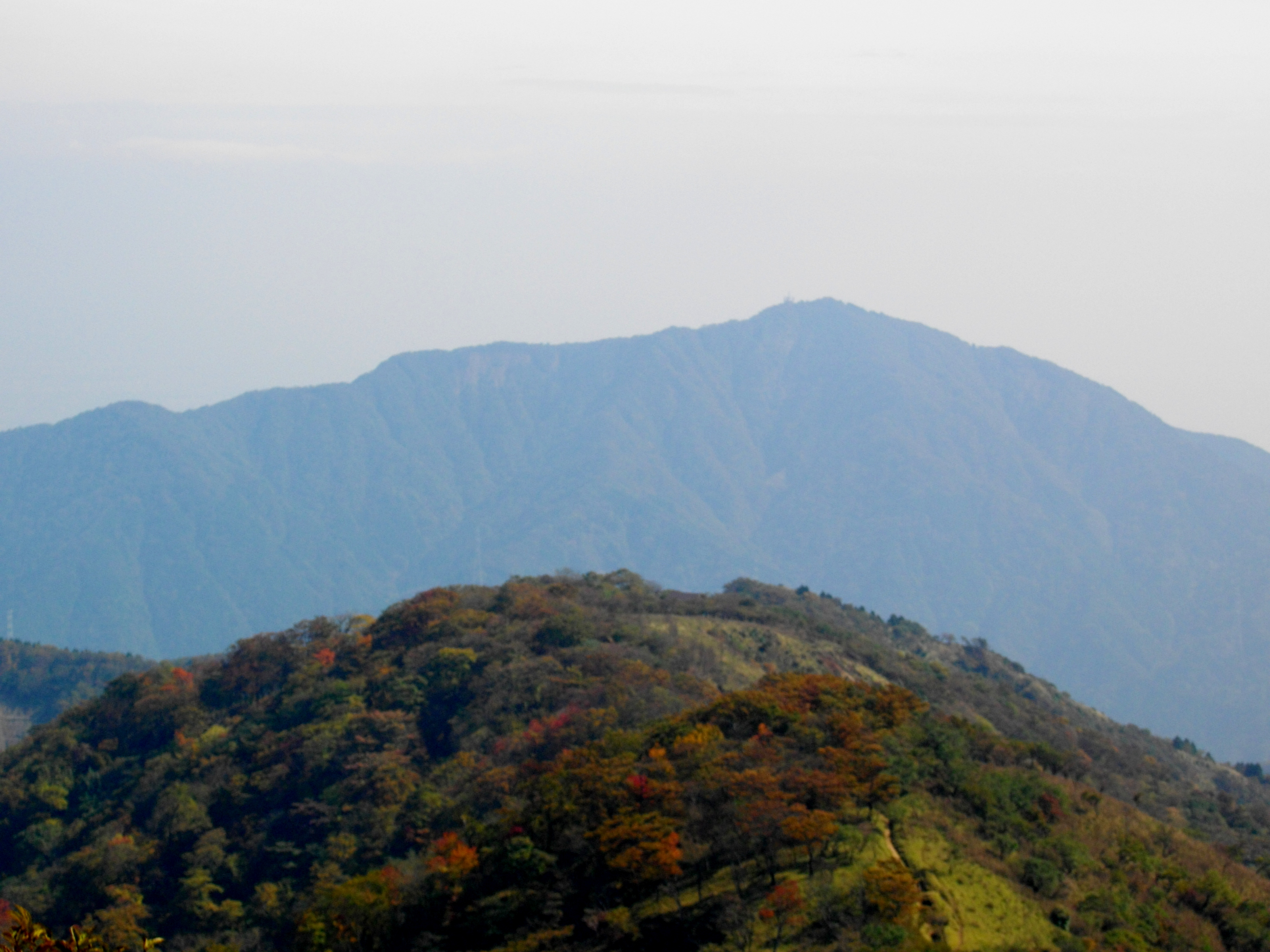
Mount Ōyama from Mount Tō (10/2008)

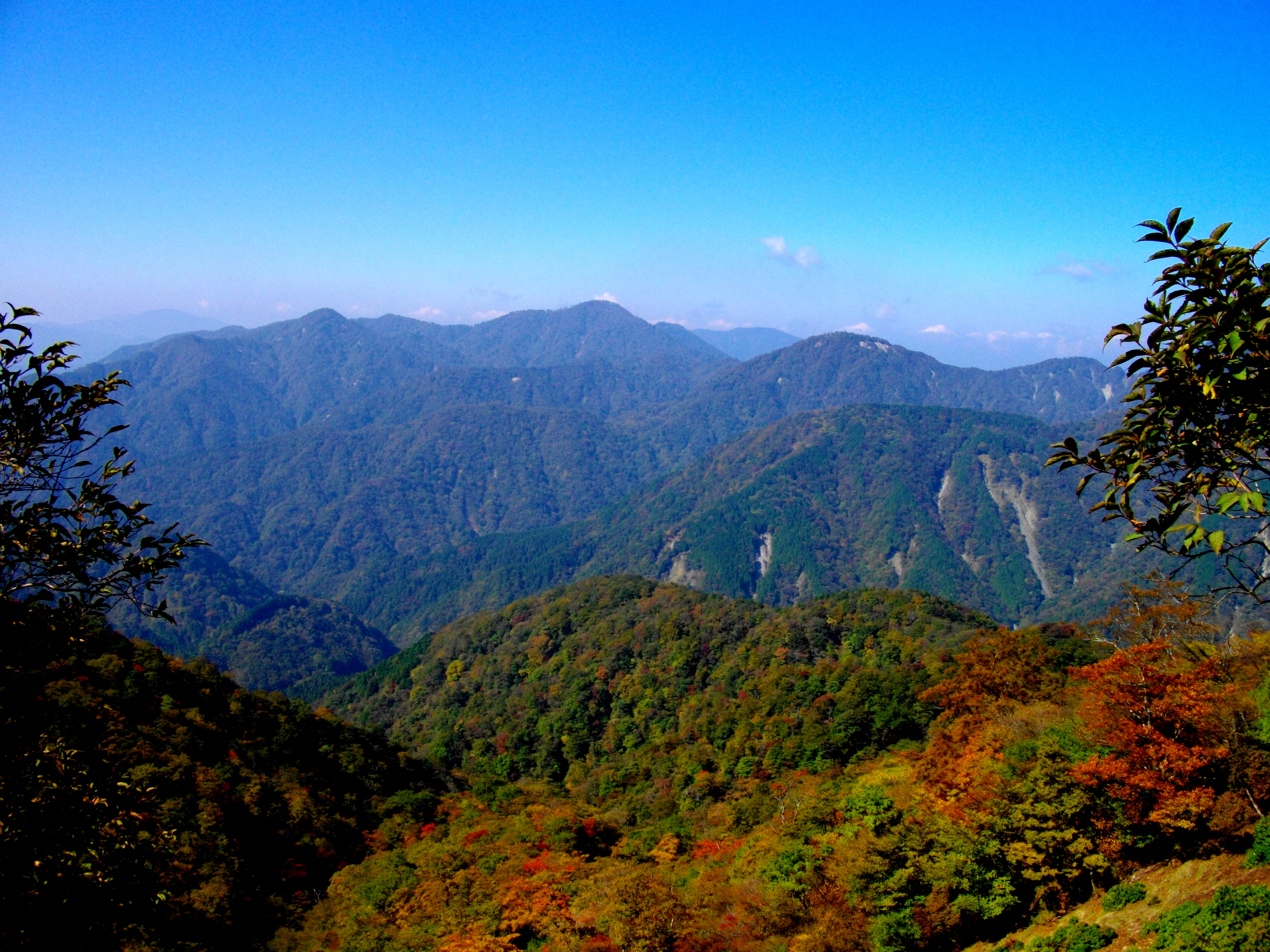
Northwest side view from Mount Tō (10/2008)

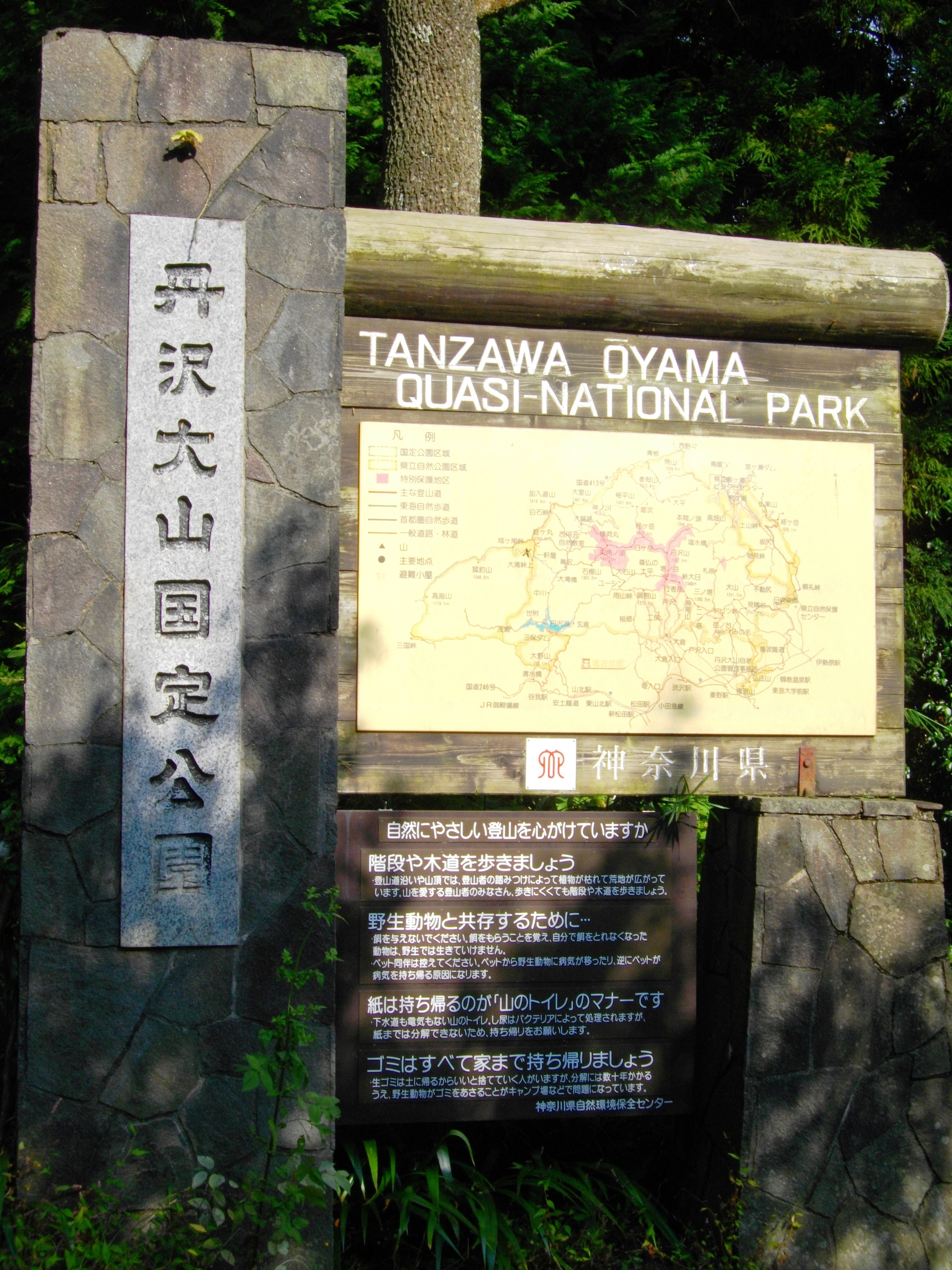
An entrance of Mount Tō (10/2008)
