= Tanzawa Mountains =

Mountain range in the Kantō region of Japan

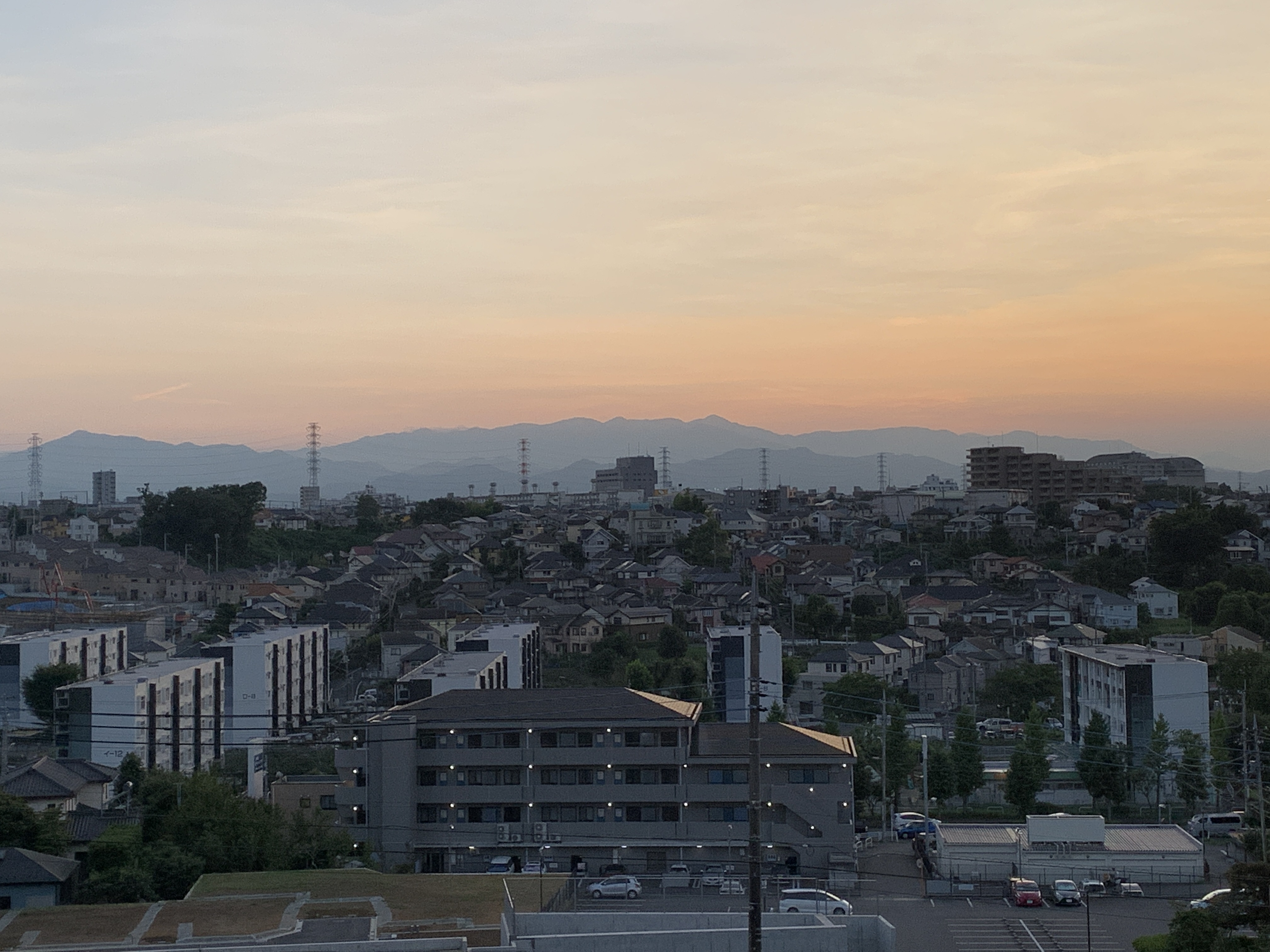
- Tanzawa mountains in the background

Highest point
- Peak: Mount Hiru
- Elevation: 1,673 m (5,489 ft)
- Coordinates: 35°29′12″N 139°8′20″E

Dimensions
- Length: 40 km (25 mi) East to West
- Width: 20 km (12 mi) North to South

Naming
- Native name: 丹沢山地 (Japanese); Tanzawa-Sanchi (Japanese)

Geography
- Country: Japan
- State: Kanagawa Prefecture
- Region: Kantō region
- Range coordinates: 35°29′N 139°09.25′E
- Parent range: Tanzawa Mountains

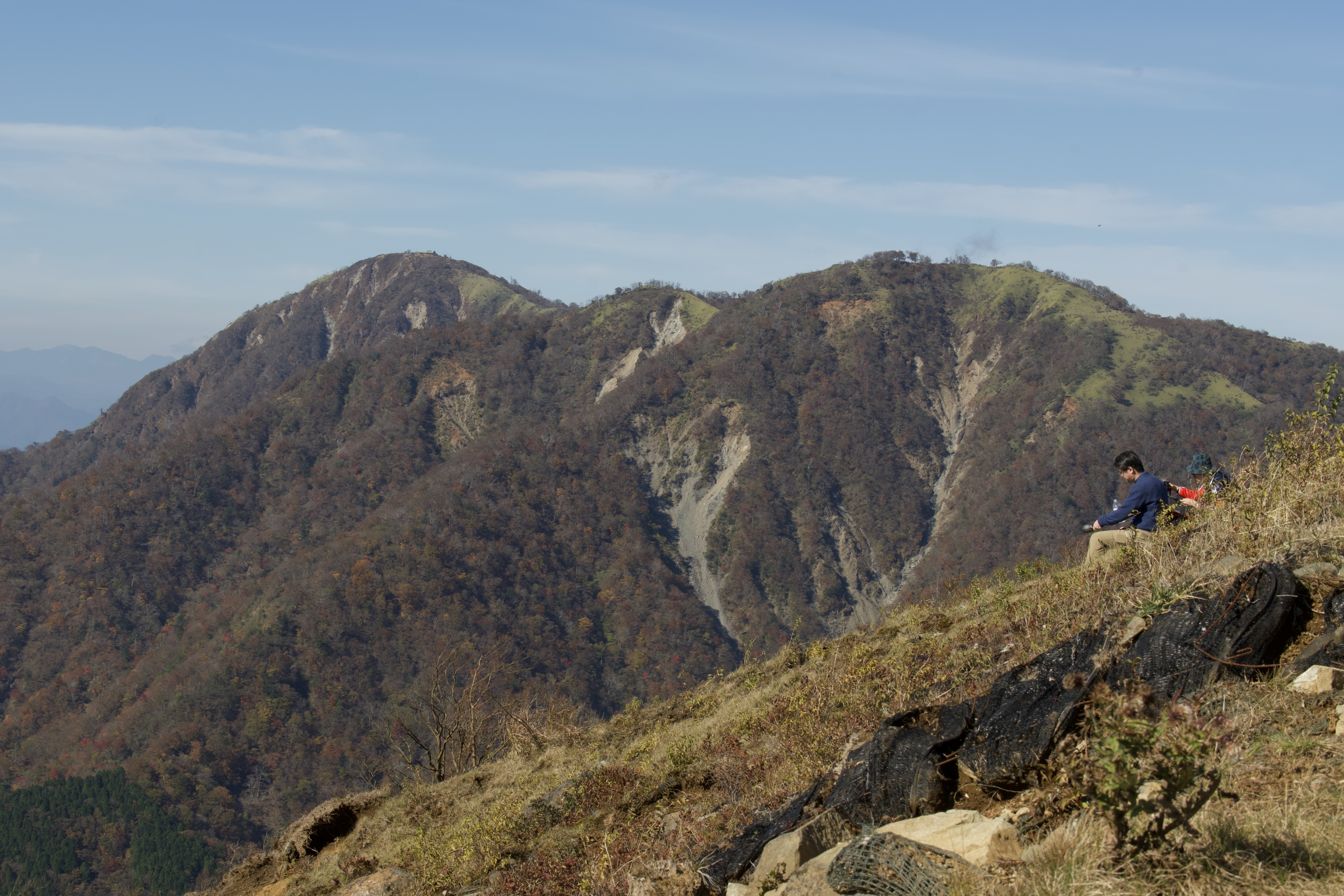
Mount Tanzawa, Mount Fudō, Mount Hiru from Mount Tō.

The Tanzawa Mountains (丹沢山地, Tanzawa-sanchi) are a mountain range in the Kantō region in Japan. The mountain range covers the northwestern part of Kanagawa Prefecture and touches the prefecture borders of Shizuoka Prefecture to the west and the Yamanashi Prefecture to the north.

== Mountains ==
- Mount Hiru 1,673 m (5,489 ft) (蛭ヶ岳 Hiru-ga-take)
- Mount Fudō 1,614 m (5,295 ft) (不動ノ峰 Fudō-no-mine)
- Mount Hinokiboramaru 1,601 m (5,253 ft) (檜洞丸 Hinokibora-maru)
- Mount Tanzawa 1,567 m (5,141 ft) (丹沢山 Tanzawa-san)
- Mount Tō 1,491 m (4,892 ft) (塔ノ岳 Tō-no-dake)
- Mount Shindainichi 1,340 m (4,400 ft) (新大日 Shin-dainichi)
- Mount Ōyama 1,252 m (4,108 ft) (大山 Ō-yama)

== Activities and sites ==
=== Hiking ===
The mountain range offers moderate to strenuous trails.

The most popular peaks among climbers are Mount Tō (塔ノ岳) and Mount Ōyama (大山) (in the eastern part of the mountains), mainly due to their easier transportation access from Yabitsu Pass. However, the tallest of these mountains is Mount Hiru, which is 1,673 metres (5,489 ft). In comparison, Mount Tō is 1,491 m (4,891 ft) high and Mount Ōyama is 1,252 metres (4,108 ft) high. The western part is less often visited but offers the opportunity of river trekking or sawanobori (a form of mountaineering).

Climbers come from around Japan, and there has been a growing number of international climbers.

=== Fishing ===
Fishing is popular activity within the rivers of Tanzawa. Many types of fish can be caught such as trout and yamame.

=== Sites ===
The Tanzawa Mountains are most accessible by Kanagawa Route 70, which runs between Hadano and Miyagase. The highest point of the route is Yabitsu Pass, approximately 11 km from Hadano. Toward the middle of the route is Kiyokawa Village, which offers lodging, camping, and fishing, and has a trail-head for hiking the mountains. Campsites can be found along Route 70. Another place of interest is Lake Miyagase, which is man-made and filled with a dam.

== Wildlife and flora ==
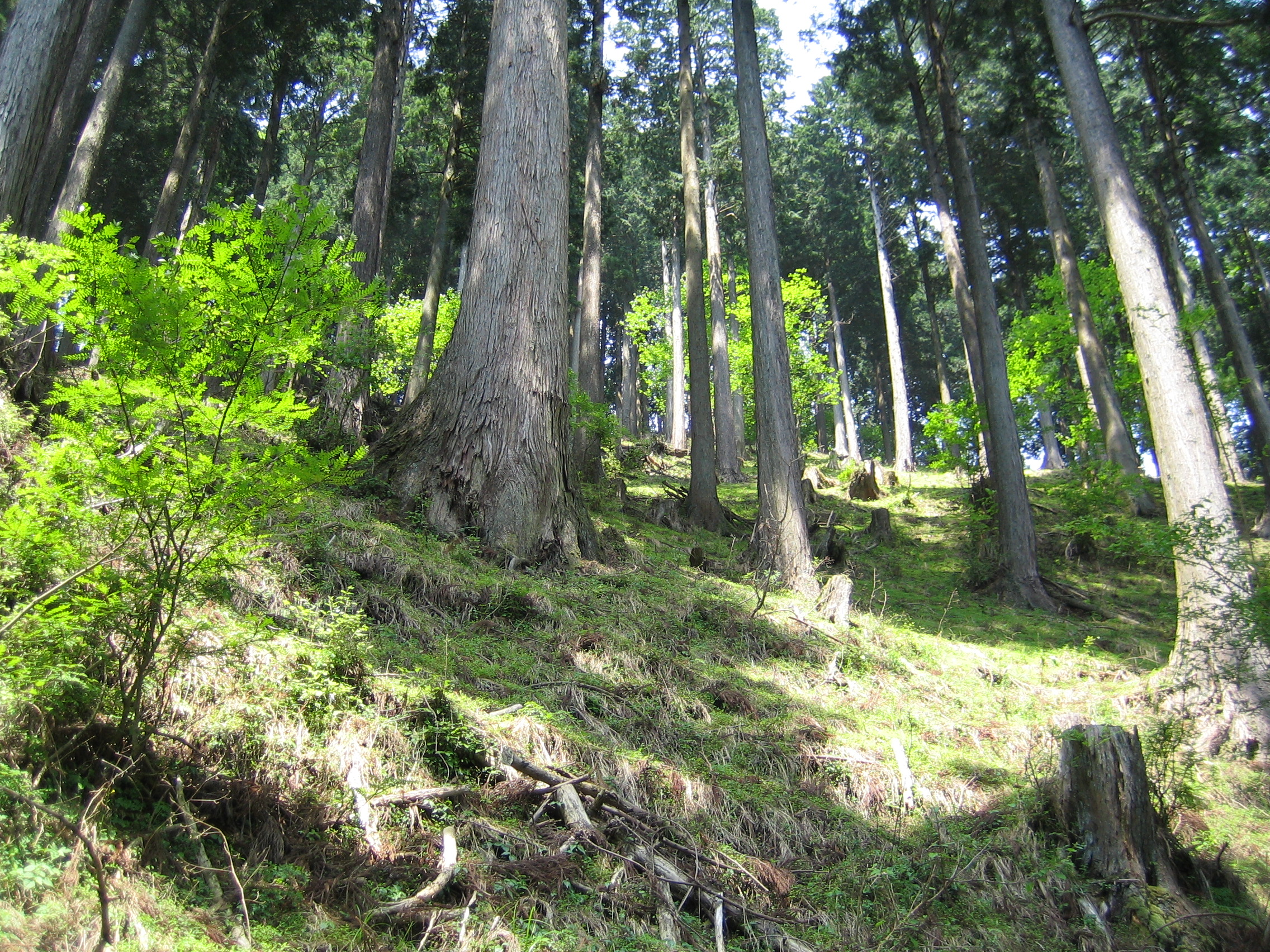
Japanese cedar forest in the Tanzawa Mountains

The landscape of the Tanzawa Mountains consists of rivers, streams, forests, mountains, valleys, and ridges. Like much of Japan, the moist climate allows for lush vegetation which offers habitats for a variety of wildlife.

The forestry is mixed and consisting of nearly half of the trees coniferous and the other half deciduous. The coniferous trees include Japanese cedar (杉) and Hinoki cypress (檜), and are mainly seen in the lower altitudes near the valleys. The deciduous trees include Japanese mountain maple (山紅葉) and Japanese beech, and are more common in the higher altitudes. Flowers can be found throughout the year, such as Rhododendron.

The area is populated with Japanese deer (鹿), Japanese raccoon dog (狸), Japanese flying squirrel and Japanese serow. There is also the Asiatic black bear throughout the mountains. Additionally, hundreds of species of birds such as white-backed woodpecker and Japanese pygmy woodpecker. Along the river banks, frogs and lizards can be commonly found.
