= Aikō District =

District in Kanagawa Prefecture, Japan

Coordinates: 35°29′59″N 139°15′12″E

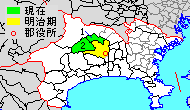
Map of Aikō District with Meiji period area in yellow, modern area in green: 1. - Aikawa, 2. - Kiyokawa

Aikō District (愛甲郡, Aikō-gun) is a district located in central Kanagawa Prefecture, Japan. It currently consists of only one town, Aikawa, and one village, Kiyokawa. The city of Atsugi was formerly part of Aikō District.

== Towns and villages ==
- Aikawa
- Kiyokawa

== History ==
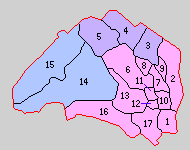
Historic Map of Aikō District

Aikō District was one of the ancient subdivisions of Sagami Province, extending from central Sagami north to the border of Musashi Province between the Sagami River and the Tanzawa Mountains. The district offices were located in what is now part of Atsugi. The area was part of a vast shōen controlled by the Ōe clan, and their descendants, the Mōri clan of Chōshū from the Heian period through the Sengoku period. It later became a contested area between the later Hōjō clan of Odawara and the Takeda clan of Kai. In the Edo period, it was nominally part of Odawara Domain, although large portions were tenryō territory controlled by the shōgun in Edo through various hatamoto. From 1706, a branch of the Ōkubo clan in Odawara was permitted to establish the Ogino-Yamanaka Domain on a portion of the district. Other portions of the district came under control of Karasuyama Domain of Shimōsa Province.

With the Meiji Restoration of 1868, Ogino-Yamanaka Domain came under the control of Shizuoka Domain, while remaining territories became part of the new Kanagawa Prefecture. With the abolition of the han system in 1871, former Ogino-Yamanaka Domain became Ogino-Yamanaka Prefecture, and subsequently part of the short-lived Ashigaru Prefecture. It merged with Kanagawa Prefecture in 1876.

=== Timeline ===
- The new Aikō and Tsukui Districts were established in 1878.
- In 1889, Aikō District was administratively divided into the following municipalities:
  - one town (Atsugi)
  - 16 villages (Koayu, Tamagawa, Nanmori, Mita, Tanasawa, Shimokawairi, Tsumada, Oikawa, Hayashi, Echi, Ogino, Aikawa, Takamine, Nakatsu, Susugaya and Miyagase)
- In 1940, Aikawa Village was elevated to town status.
- In 1946, Mutsuai Village was created through the merger of six villages (Mita, Tanasawa, Shimokawairi, Tsumada, Oikawa and Hayashi).
- In 1955:
  - January 15 – The village of Takamine was absorbed into Aikawa.
  - February 1 – The village of Mutsuai merged with the town of Atsugi and three other villages (Koayu, Tamagawa and Nanmori) to form the city of Atsugi.
  - July 8 – The village of Echi was absorbed into Atsugi.
- In 1956:
  - September 30 – Kiyokawa Village was created through the merger of two villages (Susugaya and Miyagase).
  - September 30 – The village of Nakatsu was absorbed into Aikawa.
  - September 30 – The village of Ogino was absorbed into Atsugi.

=== Merger table ===
pre-1889	April 1, 1889	1889–1926	1926–1943	1944–1954	1955–1989	1989–Present	Present
	Atsugi town	Atsugi town	Atsugi town	Atsugi town	February 1, 1955; Atsugi city	Atsugi city	Atsugi city
	Koayu village	Koayu village	Koayu village	Koayu village	February 1, 1955; Atsugi city	Atsugi city	Atsugi city
	Tamagawa village	Tamagawa village	Tamagawa village	Tamagawa village	February 1, 1955; Atsugi city	Atsugi city	Atsugi city
	Nanmori village	Nanmori village	Nanmori village	Nanmori village	February 1, 1955; Atsugi city	Atsugi city	Atsugi city
	Mita village	Mita village	Mita village	June 1, 1946; Mutsuai village	February 1, 1955; Atsugi city	Atsugi city	Atsugi city
	Tanasawa village	Tanasawa village	Tanasawa village	June 1, 1946; Mutsuai village	February 1, 1955; Atsugi city	Atsugi city	Atsugi city
	Shimokawairi village	Shimokawairi village	Shimokawairi village	June 1, 1946; Mutsuai village	February 1, 1955; Atsugi city	Atsugi city	Atsugi city
	Tsumada village	Tsumada village	Tsumada village	June 1, 1946; Mutsuai village	February 1, 1955; Atsugi city	Atsugi city	Atsugi city
	Oikawa village	Oikawa village	Oikawa village	June 1, 1946; Mutsuai village	February 1, 1955; Atsugi city	Atsugi city	Atsugi city
	Hayashi village	Hayashi village	Hayashi village	June 1, 1946; Mutsuai village	February 1, 1955; Atsugi city	Atsugi city	Atsugi city
	Echi village	Echi village	Echi village	Echi village	July 8, 1955 merged with Atsugi city	Atsugi city	Atsugi city
	Ogino village	Ogino village	Ogino village	Ogino village	September 30, 1956 merged with Atsugi city	Atsugi city	Atsugi city
	Aikawa village	Aikawa village	April 1, 1940; Aikawa town	Aikawa town	January 15, 1955; Aikawa town	Aikawa town	Aikawa town
	Takamine village	Takamine village	Takamine village	Takamine village	January 15, 1955; Aikawa town	Aikawa town	Aikawa town
	Nakatsu village	Nakatsu village	Nakatsu village	Nakatsu village	September 30, 1956 merged with Aikawa town	Aikawa town	Aikawa town
	Susugaya village	Susugaya village	Susugaya village	Susugaya village	September 30, 1956; Kiyokawa village	Kiyokawa village	Kiyokawa village
	Miyagase village	Miyagase village	Miyagase village	Miyagase village	September 30, 1956; Kiyokawa village	Kiyokawa village	Kiyokawa village
