= Mount Hiru =

Mountain in Japan

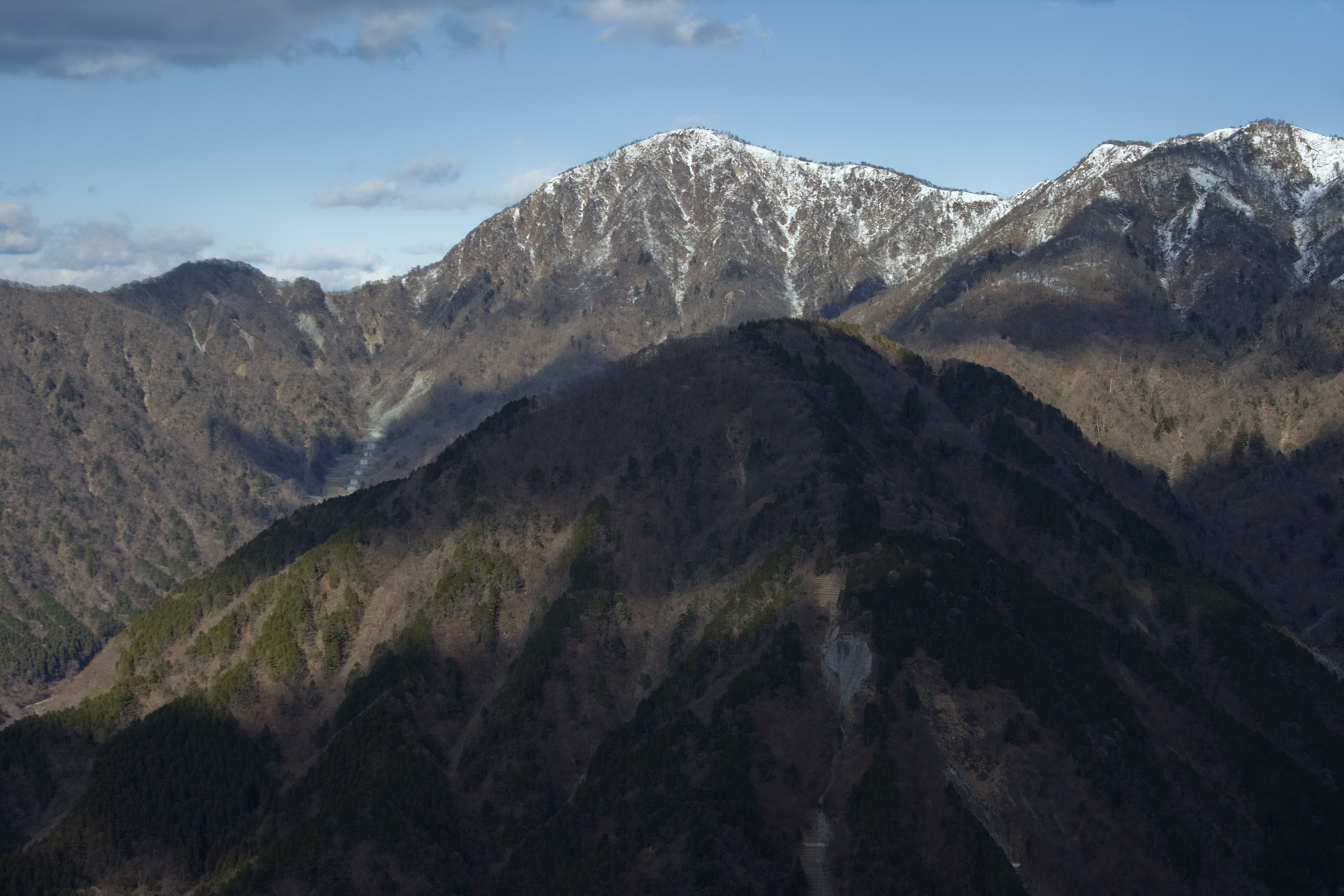
- Mount Hiru from Nabewari-ridge (Dec 2007)

Highest point
- Elevation: 1,675 m (5,495 ft)
- Coordinates: 35°29′12″N 139°8′20″E

Geography
- Location: Kanagawa, Japan
- Parent range: Tanzawa Mountains

Climbing
- First ascent: unknown

Mount Hiru (蛭ヶ岳 Hiru-ga-take) is the tallest mountain of the Tanzawa Mountains with a height of 1,675 metres (5,495 ft).

== Gallery ==
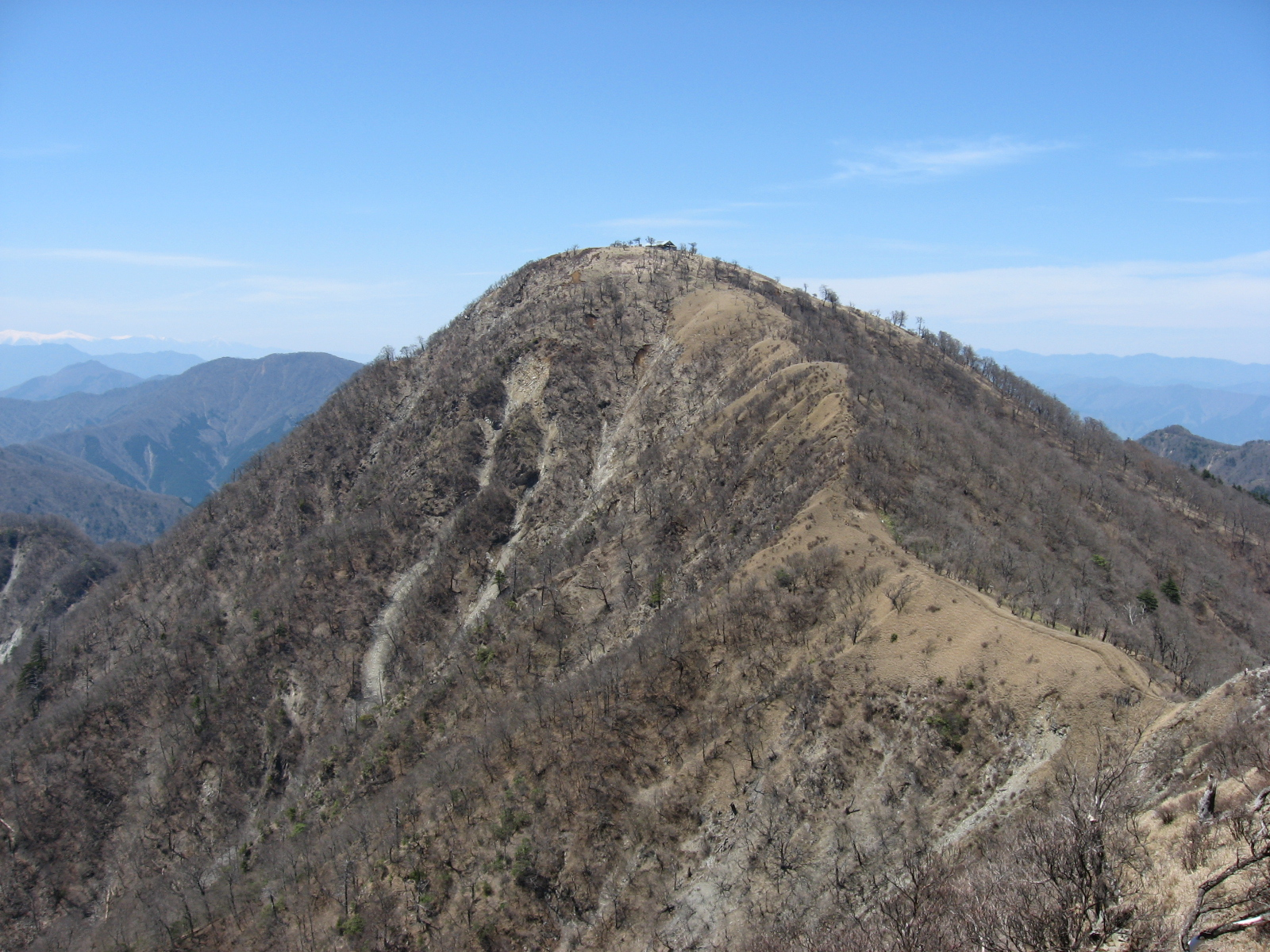

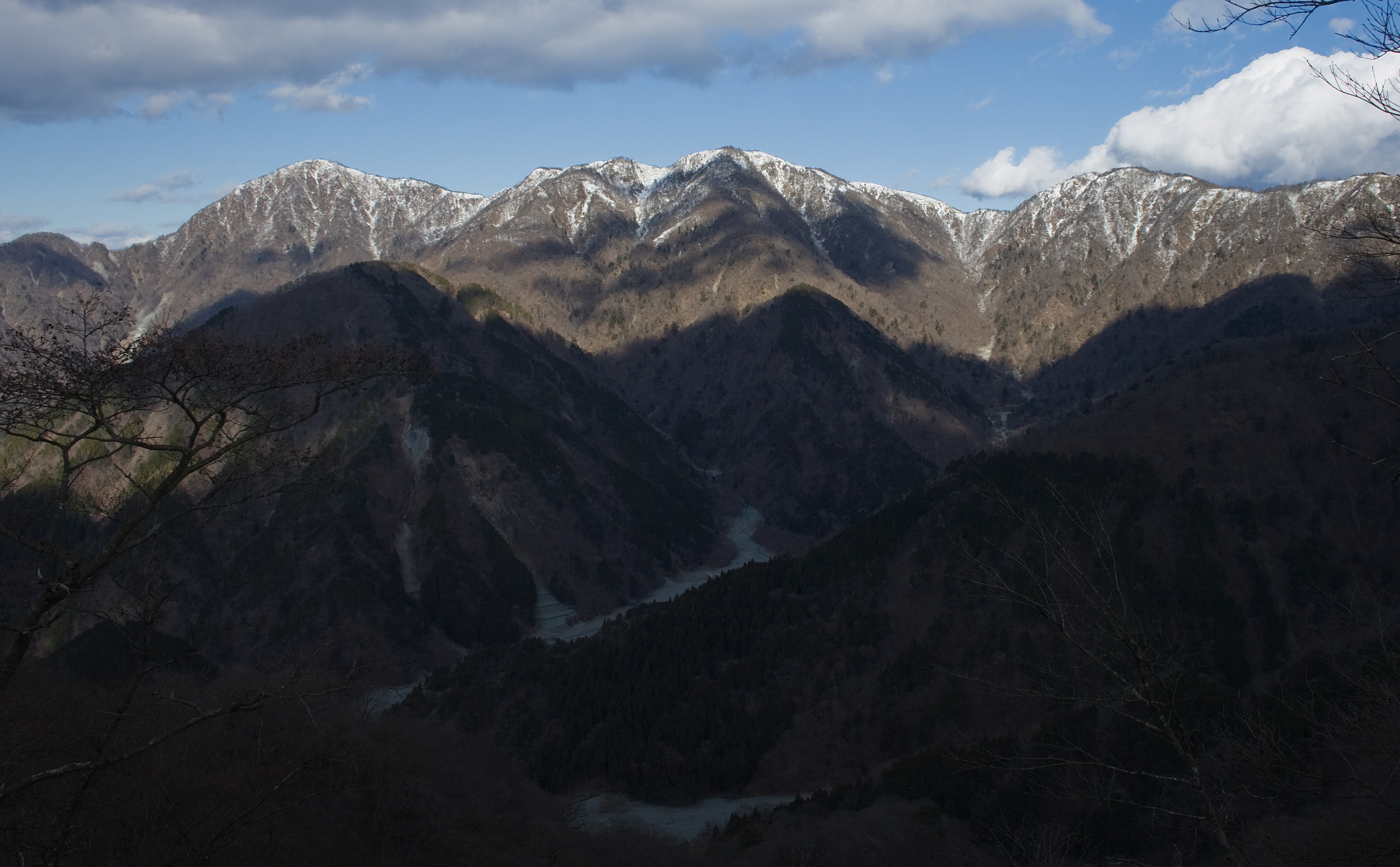

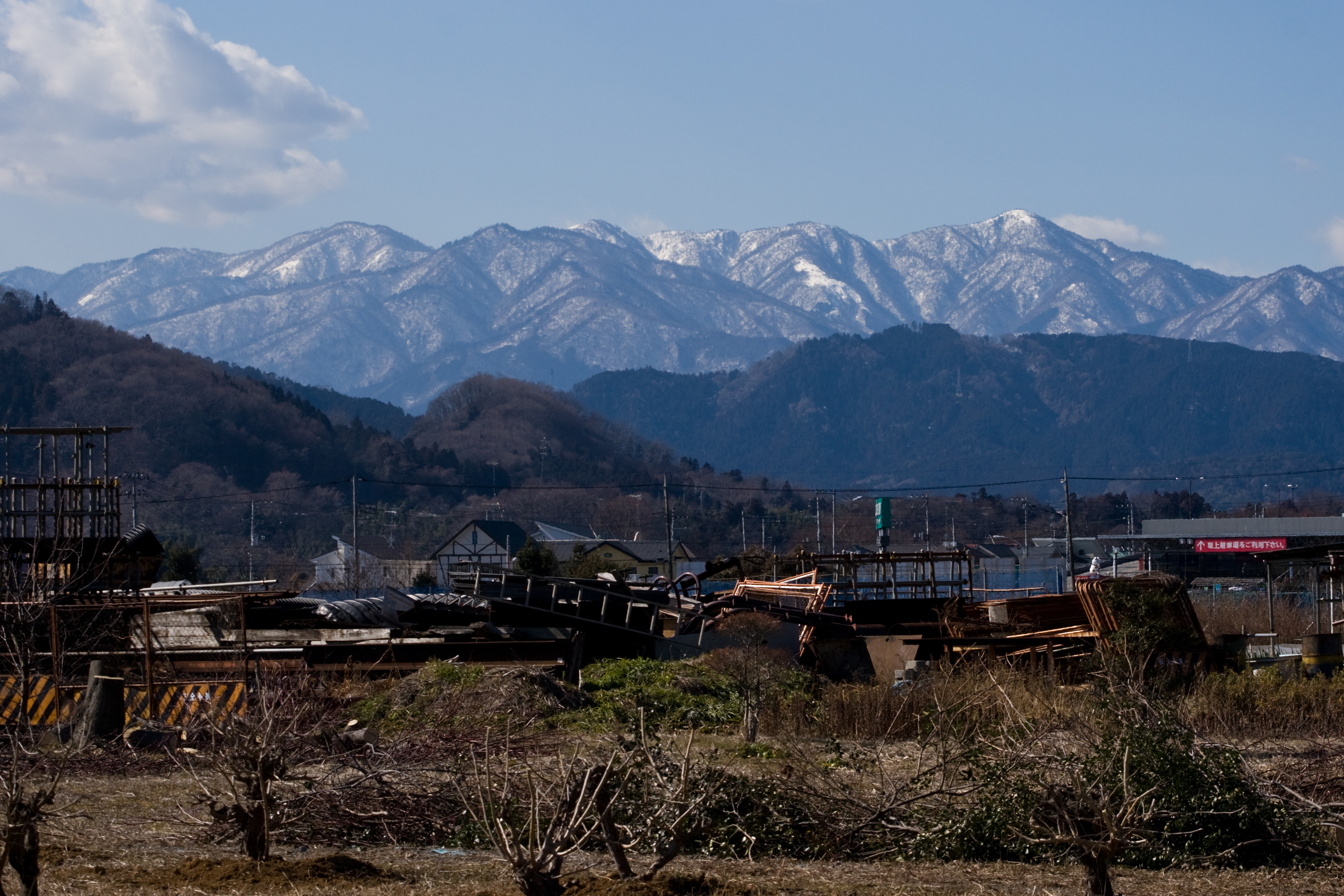
