= Kiyokawa, Kanagawa =

Kiyokawa 清川村
- Village
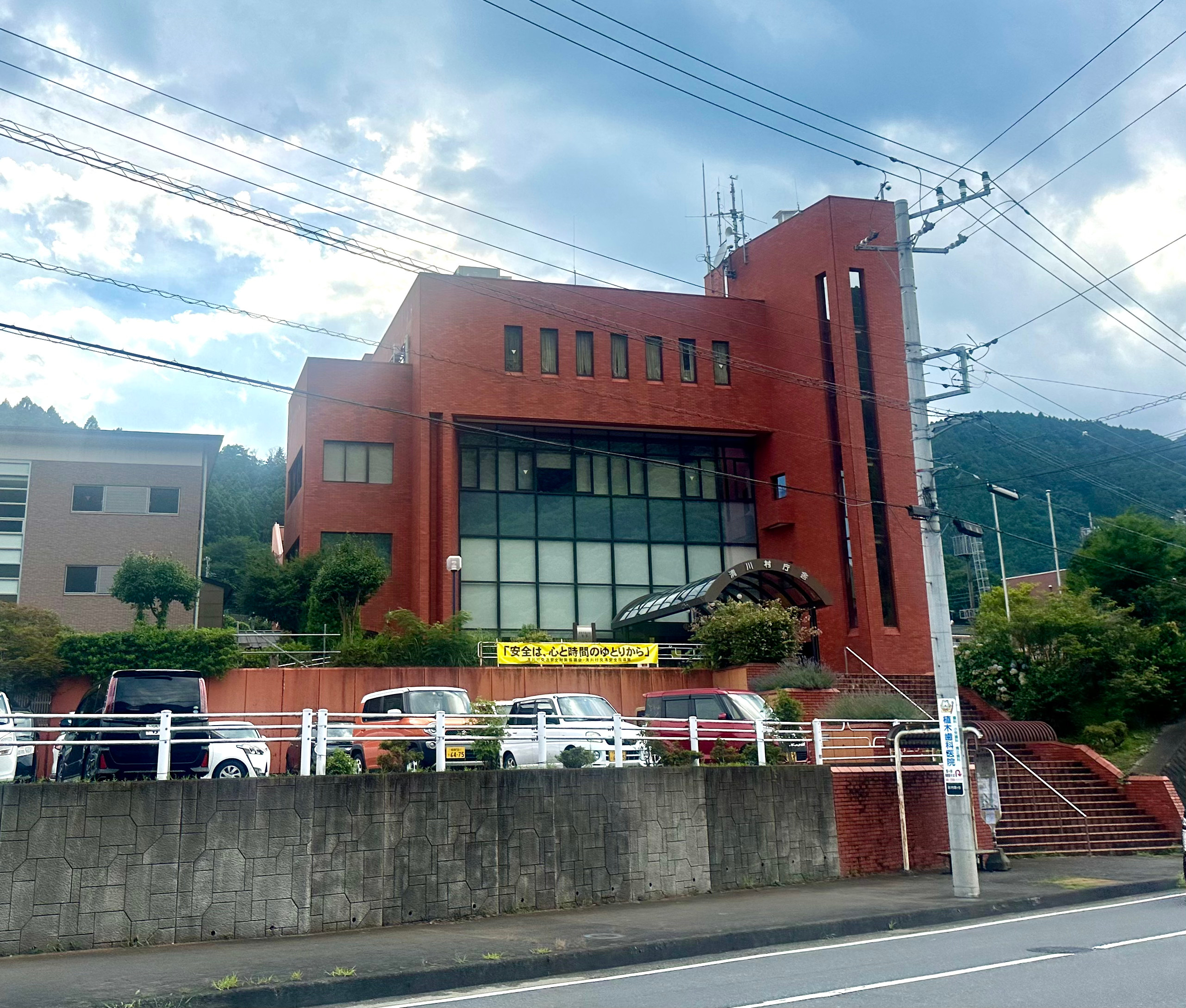
- Kiyokawa Village Hall

- Flag Emblem
- Interactive map of Kiyokawa
- Location within Japan
- Coordinates: 35°28′56″N 139°16′35″E
- Country: Japan
- Region: Kantō
- Prefecture: Kanagawa
- District: Aikō

Area
  - Total: 71.29 km^{2} (27.53 sq mi)

Population (April 30, 2021)
  - Total: 2,858
  - Density: 40.09/km^{2} (103.8/sq mi)
- Time zone: UTC+9 (Japan Standard Time)
- Symbols
  - Tree: Maple
  - Flower: Rhododendron
  - Bird: Japanese bush-warbler
- Phone number: 046-288-1211
- Address: 2216 Susugaya, Kiyokawa-mura, Aikō-gun, Kanagawa-ken; 243-0195
- Website: Official website

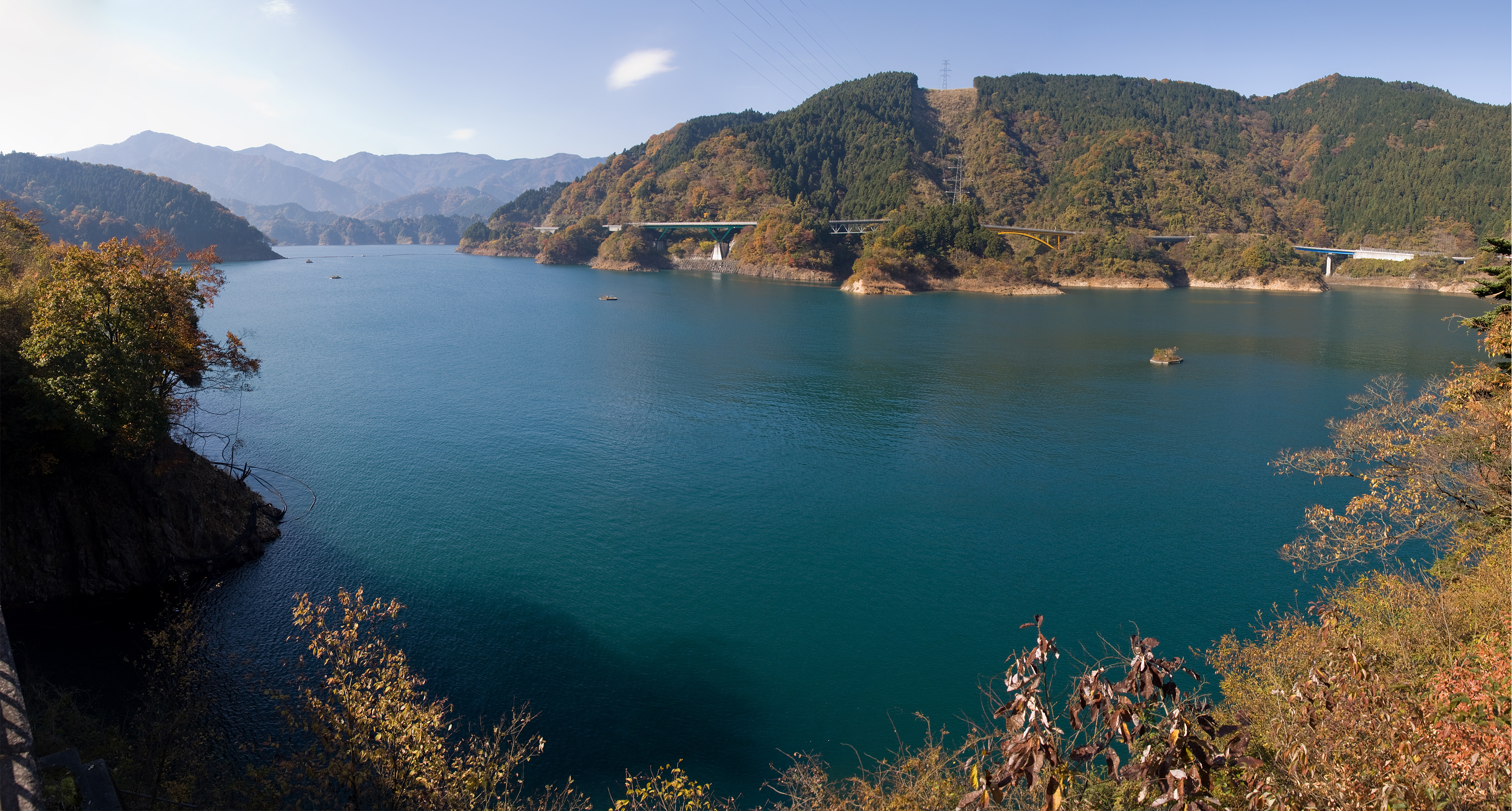
Lake Miyagase

Kiyokawa (清川村, Kiyokawa-mura) is a village located in Kanagawa Prefecture, Japan. As of 1 October 2023, the village had an estimated population of 2,912 and a population density of 40,8 persons per km^{2}. The total area of the village is 71.29 square kilometres (27.53 sq mi).

== Geography ==
Kiyokawa is located in the foothills of northwestern Kanagawa Prefecture. Much of the village is in the Tanzawa Mountains. The village area is shaped like an upward triangle, and is roughly divided into the Miyagase district (former Miyagase village) in the north and the Susugaya district (former Susugaya village) in the south. The main population center and village hall are in the Susugaya area. The Miyagase Dam, which boasts one of the largest water storage capacity in the Kanto region, is in the Miyagase area, and as a result of the creation of the reservoir, most of the inhabitants of the Miyagase area were forced to relocated to neighboring Atsugi.

=== Surrounding municipalities ===
Kanagawa Prefecture

- Aikawa
- Atsugi
- Hadano
- Sagamihara
- Yamakita

=== Climate ===
Kiyokawa has a humid subtropical climate (Köppen Cfa) characterized by warm summers and cool winters with light to no snowfall. The average annual temperature in Kiyokawa is 12.1 °C. The average annual rainfall is 1906 mm with September as the wettest month. The temperatures are highest on average in August, at around 23.3 °C, and lowest in January, at around 0.9 °C.

== Demographics ==
Per Japanese census data, the population of Kiyokawa has remained relatively constant over the past century.

Historical population
Year	Pop.	±%
1920	2,761	—
1930	2,920	+5.8%
1940	2,855	−2.2%
1950	3,313	+16.0%
1960	2,895	−12.6%
1970	2,757	−4.8%
1980	3,539	+28.4%
1990	3,549	+0.3%
2000	3,482	−1.9%
2010	3,459	−0.7%
2020	3,038	−12.2%

== History ==
Kiyokawa Village was established on September 30, 1956, through the merger of former Susugaya and Miyagase villages. The completion of the Miyagase Dam in 1965 submerged much of former Miyagase Village, forcing the relocation of its inhabitants to other locations within Kiyokawa Village and neighboring Aikawa Town.

== Government ==
Kiyokawa has a mayor-council form of government with a directly elected mayor and a unicameral village council of 10 members. Kiyokawa, together with neighboring Aikawa, contributes one member to the Kanagawa Prefectural Assembly. In terms of national politics, the village is part of Kanagawa 16th district of the lower house of the Diet of Japan.

== Economy ==
Kiyokawa has a rural economy centered on livestock, farming and forestry.

== Education ==
Kiyokawa has two public elementary schools and two public middle schools operated by the village government. The village does not have a high school.

== Transportation ==
Kiyokawa has no connections with the Japanese national highway or railway systems. Access is by Kanagawa Prefectural Routes 60, 64, 70 or 514.

== Noted people from Kiyokawa ==
- Hitoshi Tamura, professional baseball player
