= Japanese Vietnamese =

Japanese Vietnamese or Vietnamese Japanese may refer to:

- Japan–Vietnam relations
- Japanese language education in Vietnam
- Japanese people in Vietnam
- Vietnamese people in Japan
- Multiracial people of Japanese and Vietnamese descent
