= Japanese School in Ho Chi Minh City =

Japanese international school in Ho Chi Minh City

- ホーチミン日本人学校; Trường Nhật Bản

Location
- Saigon South, Block M9, Tan Phu Street, Tan Phu Ward, District 7, Ho Chi Minh City, Viet Nam
- Coordinates: 10.725318°N 106.73003199999994°E

Information
- Type: Private school Elementary school Secondary school
- Established: 1997
- Grades: 1-9
- Gender: Co-educational
- Education system: Japanese Curriculum
- Language: Japanese
- Website: jschoolhcmc.com

Japanese School in Ho Chi Minh City (JSHCM) (ホーチミン日本人学校, Hō Chi Min Nihonjin Gakkō) is a Japanese international school in Tan Phu Ward, Phú Mỹ Hung, District 7, Ho Chi Minh City, Vietnam. It was established in 1997. It provides a full-time educational program for Japanese nationals living in the city and surrounding areas, following the curriculum standards set by the Japanese Ministry of Education.

== Overview ==
The school serves students from Grade 1 to Grade 9, covering both elementary and junior high school education. The primary objective of the school is to offer an education equivalent to that of public schools in Japan, facilitating a smooth transition for students who may return to Japan in the future.

- Established: 1997
- Grades: 1-9 (Elementary and Junior High School)
- Curriculum: Japanese Curriculum
- Gender: Co-educational
- Location: Saigon South, Block M9, Tan Phu Street, Tan Phu Ward, District 7, Ho Chi Minh City, Vietnam

== History ==
The Japanese School in Ho Chi Minh City was officially established in 1997 to meet the growing educational needs of the local Japanese expatriate community. Before its establishment, Japanese language education in the area had a history dating back to the 1940s, with various initiatives and schools emerging over time.

== See also ==
- Japanese people in Vietnam
- Japan–Vietnam relations
- Japanese language education in Vietnam
