= Japanese people in Vietnam =

Japanese expatriates and descendants in Vietnam
- (Japan) (Vietnam)
- Japanese red seal ship sailing out of Nagasaki for Annam (Vietnam)

Total population
- 21,819 (October 2022)

Regions with significant populations
- Hanoi, Ho Chi Minh City

Languages
- Vietnamese · Japanese

Religion
- Buddhism · Shinto

Related ethnic groups
- Japanese diaspora

The community of Japanese expatriates and descendants in Vietnam consist mainly of Japanese expatriates and migrants residing in Vietnam, as well as their descendants who identify their ancestry to be Japanese. As of 2016, there are about 16,145 Japanese residents in Vietnam, mostly around Hanoi.

== History ==
=== Early history ===
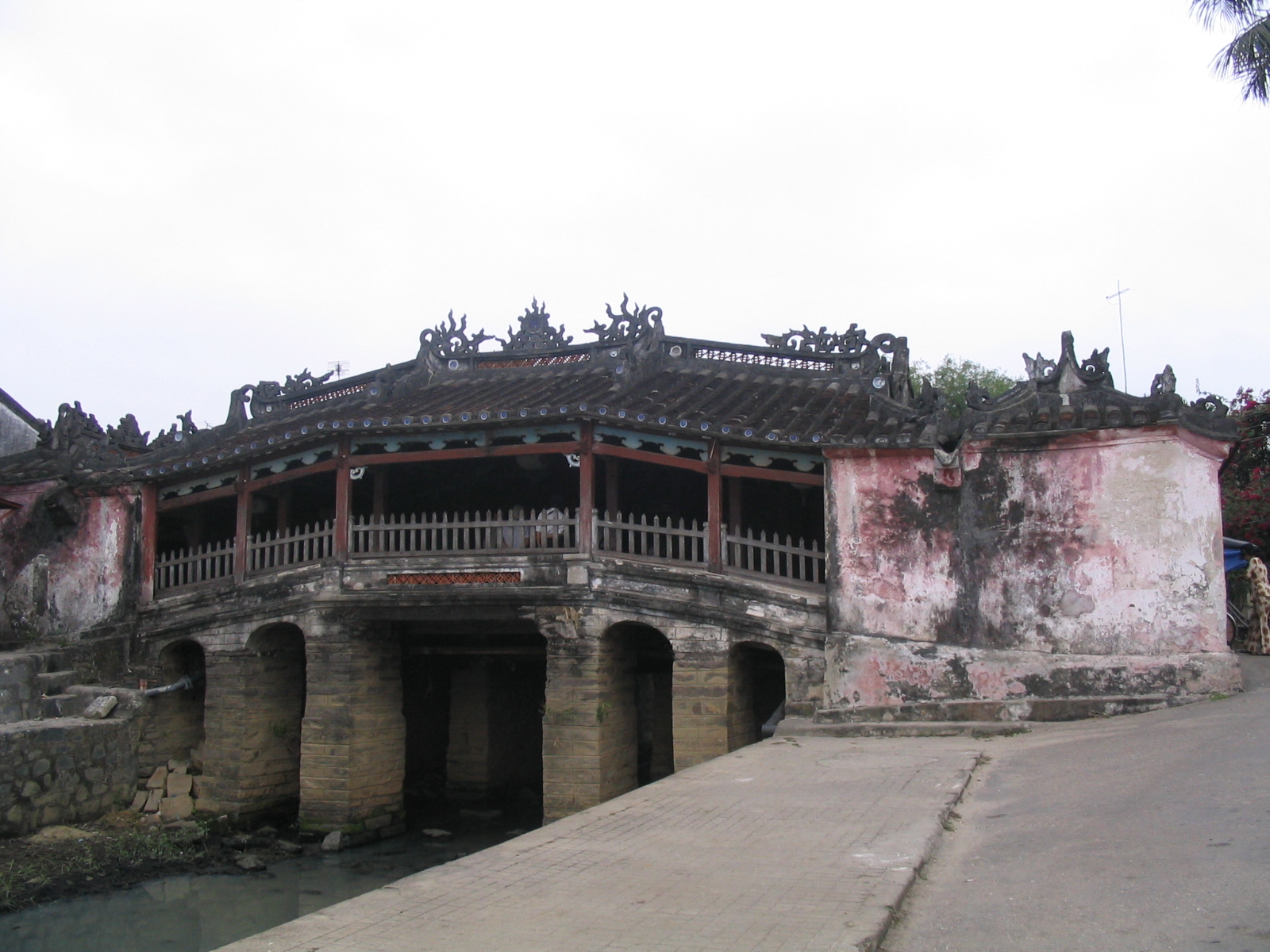
Chùa Cầu, a Japanese-built covered bridge in Hội An.

For a brief period in the 16th to the 17th centuries, Japanese overseas activity and presence in Southeast Asia and elsewhere in the region boomed. Sizeable Japanese communities, known as Nihonmachi, could be found in many of the major ports and political centers of the region, where they exerted significant political and economic influence. One of which was Hội An in Nguyễn, Southern Vietnam. The Japanese community there was quite small, consisting of only a few tens of households.

Over the course of the 17th century, the Japanese community in Hội An gradually shrank and disappeared, assimilated into the Vietnamese community. Intermarriage not only within the Nihonmachi, but between notable Japanese merchant families and the Nguyễn noble family, is indicated by contemporary records, grave markers, and various forms of anecdotal evidence. The descendants of several of these merchant families still hold today as heirlooms objects relating the families' connections to Vietnam.

Japanese women called Karayuki-san migrated to cities like Hanoi, Haiphong and Saigon in colonial French Indochina in the late 19th century to work as prostitutes and provide sexual services to French soldiers who were occupying Vietnam since the French viewed Japanese women as clean they were highly popular. Images of the Japanese prostitutes in Vietnam were put on French postcards by French photographers. The Japanese government tried to hide the existences of these Japanese prostitutes who went abroad and do not mention them in books on history. Japanese prostitutes were also in other European colonies in Southeast Asia like Singapore as well as Australia and the US.

=== World War II ===
During World War II, on 22 September 1940, Japan invaded Vietnam and began constructing military bases to strike against the Allies in Southeast Asia. Japanese troops remained in Vietnam until their surrender to the Allies in 1945.

Japanese and French troops were credited with being involved in the cause of the Vietnamese famine of 1944–1945 where 1-2 million Vietnamese people starved to death.

Some Japanese troops from the IJA stayed in Vietnam and were recruited into the ranks of the Viet Minh as NCO's and Officers were needed to train the Viet Minh in modern tactics.

Some also simply assimilated, intermarried with the Vietnamese population and adopted Vietnamese names.

In 1954, the Vietnamese government had ordered the (former) Japanese soldiers to return home. They were "encouraged" to leave their families behind effectively abandoning their war children in Vietnam.

=== Modern era ===
In recent years, many natives of Japan have migrated to Vietnam, mostly to Hanoi for all sorts of reasons. According to the Japan Foundation, Hanoi is home to under 5,000 Japanese residents. Chief among the professional lures are construction management, manufacturing and financial services jobs. Japan-owned Toyota, Honda, Panasonic, Yamaha and Canon have large manufacturing plants on the outskirts of Hanoi.

Outside of business, Japanese foreign aid services and management have also been significant. Since 1992, Japan has been the biggest international donor to Vietnam.

A Japan Foundation center in Vietnam was established in Hoàn Kiếm, Hanoi in 2008.

There are about 22,000 Japanese people living in Vietnam in 2023, most of them live in large cities. Hanoi has about 8,700 and Ho Chi Minh City has about 10,600 Japanese people.

== Education ==
There are three Japanese international schools:

- The Japanese School of Hanoi (JSH) in Nam Từ Liêm, Hanoi
- The Japanese International School (JIS) in Hà Đông, Hanoi
- The Japanese School in Ho Chi Minh City (Ho Chi Minh City/Saigon)

There is also the Ho Chi Minh City Japanese Supplementary School, a supplementary programme, is also held in Ho Chi Minh City (Saigon).

== See also ==
- Japan–Vietnam relations
- Vietnamese people in Japan
- Japanese language education in Vietnam
