= Japanese School of Hanoi =

Japanese international school in Hanoi

- ハノイ日本人学校; Trường học Nhật Bản tại Hà Nội

Location
- HAM NGHI, MY DINH 2, NAM TU LIEM, HA NOI; 21.0336858°N 105.76881530000003°E

Information
- Type: Private school Elementary school Junior high school
- Established: 1996; 30 years ago
- Grades: 1-9
- Gender: Co-educational
- Education system: Japanese Curriculum
- Language: Japanese
- Website: jsh.edu.vn

Japanese School of Hanoi (ハノイ日本人学校, Hanoi Nihonjin Gakkō; Vietnamese: Trường học Nhật Bản tại Hà Nội) is a Japanese international school in Nam Từ Liêm, Hanoi, Vietnam. It serves elementary school and junior high school.

It was established in April 1996, with an initial enrollment of 13 students. It was first located at the Hanoi University of Communications and Transport with a teaching staff of five members.

== See also ==
- Japanese people in Vietnam
- Japan–Vietnam relations
- Japanese language education in Vietnam
