= Từ Liêm district =

District of Hanoi, Vietnam

Coordinates: 21°02′22″N 105°46′03″E

Từ Liêm District Huyện Từ Liêm
- Former District
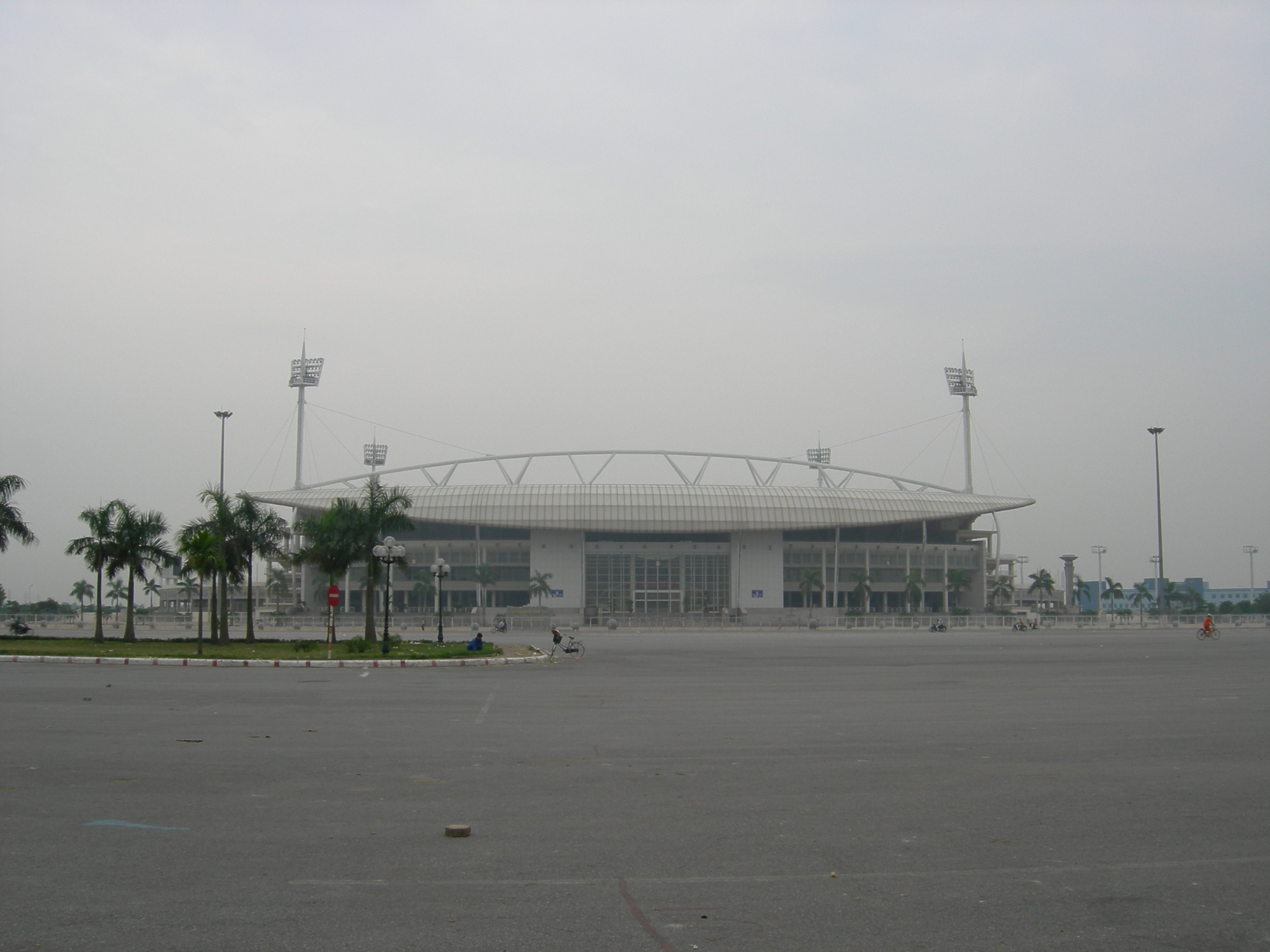
- Mỹ Đình National Stadium, located in former Từ Liêm district
- Interactive map of Từ Liêm District
- Country: Vietnam
- Region: Red River Delta
- Municipality: Hanoi
- Established: 1961
- Dissolved: 2013
- District capital: Cầu Diễn
- Subdivisions: List: 1 town; 15 communes

Từ Liêm was a rural district (huyện) of Hanoi, the capital city of Vietnam. On 27 December 2013, it was divided into two new urban districts (quận), Bắc Từ Liêm and Nam Từ Liêm.

== Education ==
The Japanese School of Hanoi is in Nam Từ Liêm.
