= Chua Vietnam =

Vietnamese Buddhist temple in Japan

Chùa Việt Nam
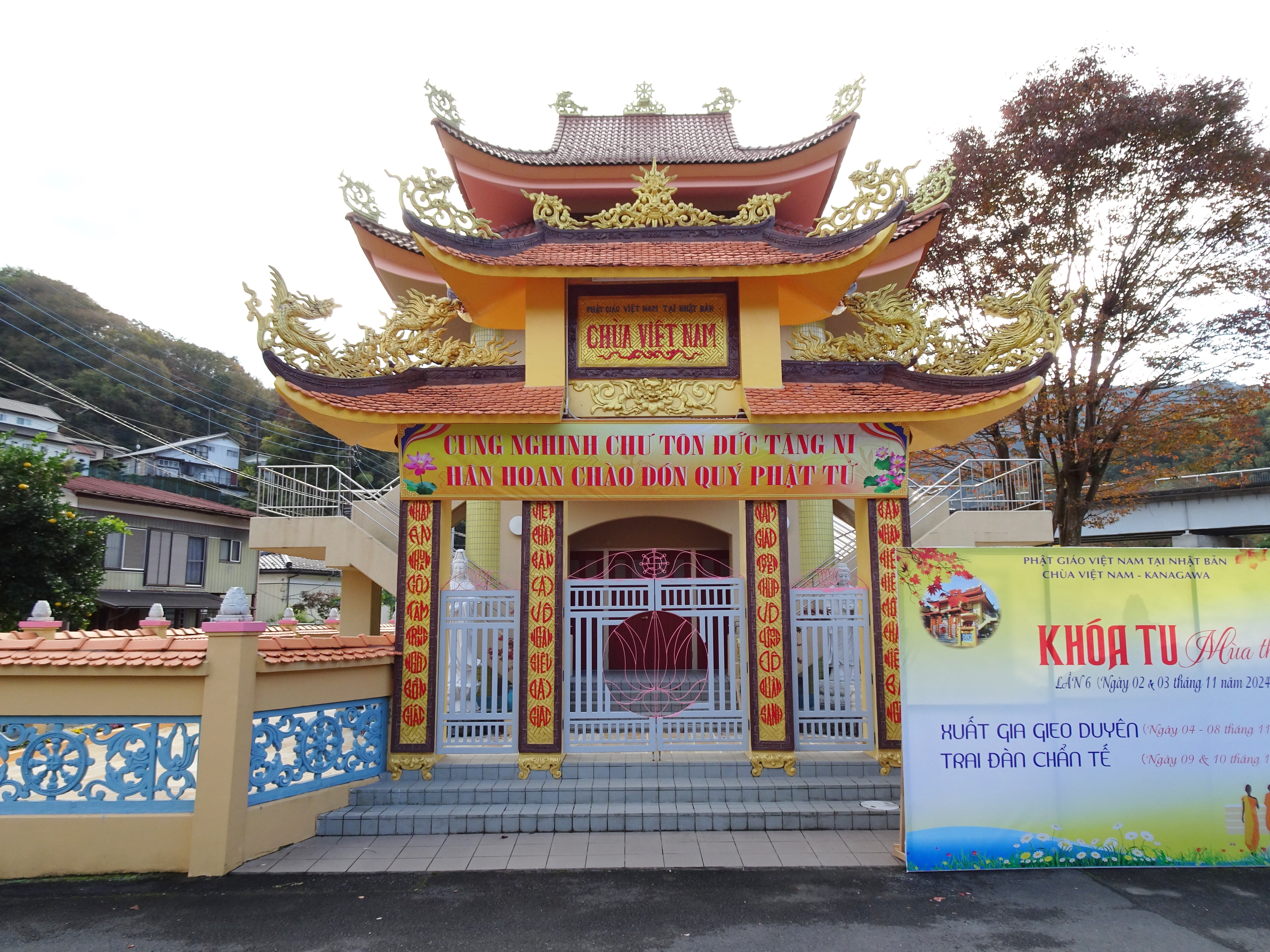

- Chua Vietnam

Religion
- Affiliation: Vietnamese Buddhism

Location
- Location: Kanagawa Prefecture, Aikō District, Aikawa Town 4889-1, Hanbara
- Coordinates: 35°32′31.93″N 139°15′46.06″E

Architecture
- Established: 2006
- Completed: 2017

Website
- Chùa Việt Nam tại Nhật Bản

Chua Vietnam (Vietnamese: Chùa Việt Nam / 厨越南) is a Vietnamese Buddhist temple in Aikawa town, Aikō District, Kanagawa Prefecture, Japan. It was established in 2006 and the current building was completed in 2017.

== Background ==
In Vietnamese, Chùa means 'temple'. Currently, there are several Vietnamese Buddhist temples in Japan, with Chua Vietnam in Aikawa being one of the largest as of 2024.

Chua Vietnam was established by Vietnamese monk Thích Minh Tuyền (1938–2017). Tuyền was born in Bình Thuận province in southeastern Vietnam, and after graduating from a Buddhist school, he worked as abbot at a temple in Ho Chi Minh City. In 1971, he accompanied a delegation to Japan and decided to stay to study.

During his decades-long stay in Japan, Tuyền frequently assisted many Vietnamese refugee families. Furthermore, he organized numerous Buddhist activities during major Buddhist holidays and traditional Vietnamese festivals at the request of Vietnamese Buddhists in exile.

Tuyền wanted to build a temple for the Vietnamese Buddhist community in Japan. In 2006, he purchased a common house in Aikawa, renovated and decorated it, and turned it into a temple. Later, the land was used for the present site of Chua Viet Nam. The groundbreaking ceremony for the current building took place in 2010 and the building was completed in 2017. To raise funds for the construction, Tuyền traveled to various countries, including the United States, France, Germany, and Australia, to seek cooperation from the Vietnamese community, including investment.

Aikawa was selected as the temple site due to its affordable land and abundant natural resources, such as rivers and mountains. Temple sites in Vietnam are typically preferred to be surrounded by rivers and mountains. Tuyền observed the natural features of Aikawa Town and concluded that it was a suitable environment for ascetic practices. The existence of a significant foreign community in Aikawa was also comforting to him. He was able to communicate with other foreign residents who were in the same situation regarding Japanese customs and etiquette.

Today, Chua Viet Nam has become a common spiritual center for the Vietnamese community in Japan. People gather there to make offerings to their ancestors, pass on Vietnamese culture to their children, and consult with monks about their problems.

== History ==
The following history is from the temple's official website.

- 1970, Tuyền went to Japan to study and work in Buddhism. Often he borrowed temples in Japan to organize festivals for the Vietnamese Buddhist community in Japan.
- 1997, Tuyền came up with the idea of purchasing land to build a temple.
- 2006, he purchased and decorated a common house in the town of Aikawa. This is the prototype of the current Chua Vietnam.
- 2010, the groundbreaking ceremony for the construction of a Vietnamese temple in Japan was held in the presence of monks from various countries.
- 2012, the first completion ceremony was held to call for continued funding.
- 2017, construction of the temple was completed.
- 2018, Tuyền died. Nhuận Ân and Giới Bảo continued to manage and operate Chua Viet Nam.

== Religion in Vietnam ==
Vietnam is a multi-religious country, and it is said that there is no preeminent 'state religion'. A sociologist of religion, Hide Miki, states that "80% of the Vietnamese people do not have a specific religion, and ancestor worship and shamanism are a part of their daily lives. However, they do not actually have a sense of belonging to a specific religion."

Buddhism in Vietnam is believed to have first come to Vietnam from the Indian subcontinent in the 3rd or 2nd century B.C., or from China in the 1st or 2nd century. Buddhism in present-day Vietnam has a mixed relationship with certain elements of Taoism, Chinese folk beliefs, and Vietnamese folk beliefs.

Under the current socialist regime of the Socialist Republic of Vietnam, religion is under strict control and management. The percentage of adherents of each religion in Vietnam varies greatly depending on the source. According to the Japanese Ministry of Foreign Affairs in 2002, 80% of the population is Buddhist. U.S. government statistics released in 2016 state that "more than half of the population is considered Buddhist."

== Vietnamese temples in Japan and the role of the Chua Vietnam ==
Japan has a community of Vietnamese Buddhists and Christians that includes several Vietnamese Buddhist temples and Christian churches.

According to an interview with Chua Vietnam conducted by Waseda University's Shiro Segawa seminar, which specializes in journalism, Chua Vietnam has three main roles:

As a Buddhist temple in its original
The role of Chua Viet Nam includes the same role of Buddhist temples in Vietnam. As in Vietnam, it is often visited by couples and Vietnamese who come to pray.

As a Vietnamese Temple in Japan
There are also worshippers unique to Vietnamese temples in Japan. Vietnamese living in Japan visit to think about their homeland and their families, Vietnamese couples who are internationally married to Japanese, and Japanese who come for tourism, research, or other cultural exchange.

As a hub among worshippers
Chua Vietnam also serves as a hub for information exchange among Vietnamese living in Japan. Chua Vietnam hosts festivals, meditation sessions, and other events that attract many Vietnamese worshippers, who exchange information about job opportunities and other topics at the temple.

== Architecture ==
Unlike Japanese temples, Chua Vietnam's building are decorated with dragons on the roofs and staircases, and the walls are painted yellow. According to Giới Bảo, Chua Vietnamese buildings are places where Vietnamese living in Japan can remember their homeland.

Tam Quan

At the entrance to Chua Vietnam is a gate called Tam quan (vi:tam quan/三關). The Tam quan is a traditional gate style symbolizing Vietnamese Buddhism, with three passages. (Traditionally, the middle passage is the largest and the two side passages are smaller.) In Vietnam, it is often used not only in Buddhist architecture, but also in other religious architecture, such as Confucianism, Taoism, Vietnamese folk religion, and Christianity. It is also used in non-religious modern buildings such as schools and People's Committee buildings.

== Worship and visiting ==
Chua Vietnam is open on Sundays and on days of various events. Every weekend, Vietnamese residents in Japan gather from Sagamihara, Atsugi, Ebina, Isehara, Hadano, and other nearby cities and towns, as well as from Tokyo, Saitama, and as far away as Nagoya. Sometimes 1,000 people gather at New Year's, when the streets are overflowing with people.

Non-Buddhists are also free to visit the temple, where they can learn about its customs and manners.

== Relationship with the local community ==
According to an interview with Abbot Nhuận Ân by a Vietnamese newspaper, he is actively trying to build a relationship with the local community in order to reduce the concerns of the surrounding residents due to noise and parking spaces as the number of worshippers increases. The monks are learning about Japanese culture and the Japanese language, and they hope that gradually Japanese people living in the surrounding area will visit and understand more about Vietnamese people living in Japan, bringing them closer to each other.

According to an interview with Vice-abbot Giới Bảo in 2023, he is thinking of holding meditation classes in Japanese.

== Annual events ==
The following list of annual events is based on the official website.

1. Western New Year (January)
2. Lunar New Year/ Tết(February)
3. First Full Moon Festival/Tết Nguyên Tiêu (February)
4. Avalokiteśvara Bodhisattva Ceremony (March)
5. Buddha's Birthday (May)
6. Summer Retreat (August)
7. Vu Lan (August)
8. The Ceremony of the Venerable founder (August)
9. Tết Trung Thu (September)
10. Fall Retreat (November)
11. Amitabha Buddha Ceremony (December)

== Geography ==
Aikawa Town, where Chua Vietnam is located, is a small inland municipality in Kanagawa Prefecture, but has the highest percentage of foreign residents among its population in Kanagawa Prefecture. In addition to Chua Viet Nam, other foreign religious facilities such as a Thai Buddhist temple, a Cambodian Buddhist temple, and a Laotian Buddhist temple are located in Aikawa.

== See also ==
- Japan–Vietnam relations – The origin of the relationship dates back to 734 when a shipwrecked Japanese missions to Tang China drifted ashore. Today, the two countries are described as having a "loose alliance".
- Vietnamese boat people – Refugees that have arisen since 1975. One of the support facilities was established in Yamato City, Kanagawa Prefecture.
- Vietnamese people in Japan – Of the approximately 490,000 people residing in Japan as of the end of 2022, approximately 30,000 reside in Kanagawa Prefecture.
