= Kenki =

- Gender: Male

Origin
- Origin: Japanese
- Meaning: Different meanings depending on the kanji used

Kenki (written: 賢希, 堅樹 or 顕貴) is a masculine Japanese given name. Notable people with the name include:

- Kenki Fukuoka (福岡 堅樹; born 1992), Japanese rugby union player
- Kenki Sato (佐藤 賢希; born 1984), Japanese equestrian
- Shirahama Kenki (白濱 顕貴), Japanese pirate
