= Murray Sayle =

Australian journalist

- Murray Sayle, c. 1970
- Born: Murray William Sayle; 1 January 1926; Sydney, New South Wales, Australia
- Died: 19 September 2010 (aged 84); Sydney
- Education: University of Sydney
- Occupations: journalist, novelist, adventurer
- Spouse(s): (2) Maria Theresa von Stockert (marriage dissolved); (3) Jennifer Philips (three children)
- Children: 3

Murray William Sayle OAM (1 January 1926 – 19 September 2010) was an Australian journalist, novelist and adventurer.

A native of Sydney, Sayle moved to London in 1952. He was a foreign correspondent for The Sunday Times in the late 1960s and early 1970s. During his long career he covered wars in Vietnam, Pakistan and the Middle East, accompanied an expedition on its climb of Mount Everest, sailed solo across the Atlantic Ocean, was the first reporter to interview double agent Kim Philby after his defection to Russia, and trekked through the Bolivian jungle in search for Che Guevara. He resigned from The Sunday Times in 1972 after the newspaper refused to publish an investigative piece he wrote about the Bloody Sunday shootings of 26 unarmed protesters in Northern Ireland.

Sayle moved to Hong Kong in 1972 and to Japan in 1975. Altogether he remained in Japan for nearly 30 years, writing about that country for various publications, principally The Independent Magazine, The New Yorker and the New York Review of Books.

== Early years ==
Born in Earlwood, a Sydney suburb, in 1926, Sayle was the son of a railway executive. He attended the Canterbury Boys' High School before enrolling at the University of Sydney. At university, Sayle studied psychology and worked for the student magazine, Honi Soit. After leaving without taking a degree, Sayle worked as a newspaper reporter for The Sydney Daily Telegraph, the Cairns Post, and The Daily Mirror. He also worked for six years as a radio reporter for the Australian Broadcasting Corporation.

== The People and A Crooked Sixpence ==
In 1952, Sayle sailed for London in an attempt to save his relationship with singer Shirley Abicair, who had decided to move to Britain. Sayle became a reporter for the tabloid, The People. Working as an assistant to crime reporter Duncan Webb, Sayle was credited with the phrase, "I made my excuses and left." Sayle left journalism in 1956 and supported himself by selling encyclopaedias in Germany while writing a novel about his experiences on Fleet Street titled A Crooked Sixpence. The novel was pulled from publication after threats of litigation by an individual upon whom one of the characters was based. The novel was finally published more than 50 years later.

== The Sunday Times ==
Sayle worked in the early 1960s for Agence France Presse and returned to London in 1964 to work for The Sunday Times. There, he developed a reputation as "the most forceful of Fleet Street's finest." British reporter Godfrey Hodgson described Sayle as follows: "Large, shrewd and with many of the characteristics of an armoured vehicle, Murray had plenty of the 'rat-like cunning' advocated by his colleague Nick Tomalin when it came to that basic reportorial talent of getting oneself in the right place at the right time."

=== Emil Savundra and Francis Chichester ===
Sayle first made a name for himself working with The Sunday Times "Insight" team exposing the financial fraud of insurance businessman Emil Savundra. Sayle reported that the "reserves" of Savundra's insurance company included securities that were forgeries. Savundra's company collapsed in 1966, and he fled to his native Ceylon (now known as Sri Lanka). Also in 1966, Sayle gained attention when he chartered a plane to find the noted sailor Sir Francis Chichester, who had gone missing in a storm off Cape Horn during an attempt to become the first person to sail non-stop solo around the world.

=== War correspondent ===
Sayle became the newspaper's chief foreign correspondent, reporting on the Vietnam War, the 1967 Arab-Israeli War, and the Indo-Pakistani War of 1971, He received the Journalist of the Year award in the Granada Press Awards for his reports from Vietnam. In 1968, he opened an eye-witness account of an all-night Viet Cong attack as follows:

"I was sound asleep in the guest hut of the province chief's compound when I was awakened by an exchange of automatic small arms fire. I picked out the pop-pop-pop of a Browning automatic rifle followed by the steady bang of American 30-calibre machine guns and then the unmistakable three-second bursts like silk being loudly torn of Chinese AK 47s. Fumbling out of a mosquito net I dragged my boots on. Then the plop and whistle of outgoing mortars started. A glance at my watch showed it was exactly 1 a m. There was an earsplitting crack and roar and a ram of debris—a 122 rocket going off. ..."

=== Che Guevara and Kim Philby ===
In 1967, Sayle accompanied the Bolivian army as it tracked down Che Guevara in the South American jungle. Although they did not meet up with Che, they found what Sayle described as "a strongly fortified base of Castro-type Communist guerrillas." Sayle searched through the rubbish left behind at the base and found documentary evidence, including a photograph and asthma prescriptions, that enabled Sayle to report that Che had left Cuba and was fomenting Communist insurrection in South America. Forty years later Sayle wrote for the first time about his Bolivian journey and the circumstances leading to Che's execution by the Bolivian army.

He made headlines again in late 1967 when he tracked down British double agent, Kim Philby, in Moscow. After several days of staking out Moscow's foreign post office, he spotted Philby. Sayle recalled, "After a few days, I forget how many exactly, I saw a man looking like an intellectual of the 1930s, all leather patches on the elbows of his tweed jacket. I walked up to him and said, 'Mr Philby?'" He then secured the first and only interview of Philby after his 1963 defection. Sayle reported that he found Philby to be "a charming, entertaining man with a great sense of humor." Sayle also described Philby as a man with an "iron head" for drink who appeared to be enjoying his new life and who denied being a traitor. Philby told Sayle, "To betray, you must first belong. I never belonged."

=== Warsaw Pact invasion of Czechoslovakia ===
In August 1968, Sayle was sent to Prague to cover the Warsaw Pact invasion of Czechoslovakia. Fellow journalist Harold Jackson has written of Sayle's ingenuity in getting their stories out of the country. International telephone calls were blocked, and the Russians had seized the Prague telex exchange. Sayle and Jackson discovered that not all of the telex connections were blocked and spent 13 hours dialling "the 10,000 possibilities" to find a working telex code. After discovering several working exchanges, Jackson recalled that the enterprising Sayle sold the numbers to other journalists at "$100 a pop." Another obstacle facing the foreign press in Prague was a shortage of Czech crowns. Sayle took Jackson with him to the office of the Czech firm responsible for distribution of The Times in Czechoslovakia. Sayle claimed to be the publisher's personal representative and demanded that the man turn over funds that had not been remitted due to exchange restrictions. Jackson recalled, "We left the building with huge packs of Czech crowns stashed in a linen bag rustled up from some cupboard. They kept the foreign press corps functioning for weeks, no doubt at a suitable rate of exchange."

=== Mt. Everest and sailing solo across the Atlantic ===
In 1971, Sayle participated in the International Mount Everest Expedition and reporting on the expedition for BBC television. According to a published account in The New Yorker, Sayle learned of the Everest assignment while covering the war in Vietnam: "Murray was in a foxhole in Vietnam when a runner comes sprinting up through the incoming fire with a cable from The Sunday Times. 'Report to Kathmandu,' it said. 'You're going to climb Everest.'" Photographer John Cleare, who also participated in the expedition, recalled that Sayle brought "almost a complete porter load of literature" with him and added:

"[Sayle] was no stranger to hardship—some of us 'enjoyed' a ten-day storm at 21,500 feet, cut off and unable to go more than a few feet from our tents, eventually running out of food and fuel, but he didn't grumble. I don't think he ever left that tent for ten days except to crawl a few feet through the drifts into the mess tent twice a day. He did his bodily functions into poly bags which he stacked, frozen solid, in the back of the tent until we were relieved and could move about again. We found this very amusing. He was one of us. He was very determined. He kept our morale up when things got very tough on the mountain, as they eventually did when one of our most popular climbers was killed."

The expedition came within 1,800 feet of the summit, and Sayle wrote: "The very small number of people who actually know something about Himalayan mountaineering do not consider that our expedition was a failure at all."

In 1972, Murray sailed solo across the Atlantic Ocean as a participant in the Single-Handed Trans-Atlantic Race.

=== Bloody Sunday ===
Sayle became embroiled in controversy over his investigative reporting into Bloody Sunday, a January 1972 incident in Derry, Northern Ireland, in which 26 unarmed civil rights protesters and bystanders were shot, and 13 killed, by a regiment of paratroopers from the British Army. Sayle and his reporting partner, Derek Humphry, were sent to Derry to investigate the shooting and concluded that the paratroopers had not been fired upon, as they claimed, and that the shooting was the result of a planned special operation to eliminate the IRA leadership in Derry. Four days after the shooting, Sayle and Humphry turned in a 10-page story, but The Sunday Times refused to publish it. Sayle resigned in protest, and the unpublished story "vanished for a quarter-century." In 1998, The Village Voice obtained a copy of the report and published an article titled "Bloody Sunday Times", accusing the newspaper's editor of helping to "bury compelling evidence that the British military planned in advance the infamous 1972 Londonderry attack." At that time, Sayle reiterated his belief that British soldiers planned the attack on civilians.

== Asia ==
After quitting his position with The Sunday Times, Murray moved to Hong Kong as a correspondent for Newsweek magazine. In 1975, he moved to Japan. He remained in Japan for 33 years, living with his second wife and their children (Matthew, Alexander, and Maindi) in a traditional wooden house in the village of Aikawa in Kanagawa Prefecture. He reported on Asia for The Independent Magazine, The New Yorker and the New York Review of Books. His most noted work during this time includes his reporting on the 1989 Tiananmen Square massacre and the 1983 disappearance of Korean Air Lines Flight 007.

In August 1995, on the 50th anniversary of the atomic bombings of Hiroshima and Nagasaki,The New Yorker published a lengthy investigative piece by Sayle entitled "Did the Bomb End the War?" Sayle contended that the bombing was not motivated by a desire to persuade the Japanese to surrender, and was instead motivated by the Soviet invasion of Manchuria and concerns that Soviet forces would then invade Hokkaido and force a division of Japan.

In The New Yorker, Hendrik Hertzberg remembered Sayle as follows:

"Murray Sayle ... was a wonder—a journalist of Promethean gifts and Brobdingnagian accomplishment, a lightning-fast writer whose witty, energetic prose was flavored with a tasty mixture of brash informality and autodidactic erudition, a fearless adventurer in war zones and on the high seas, an instinctive (but sweet-natured!) adversary of every kind of authority, not excepting the authority of the newspaper and magazine editors lucky enough to secure his services. He was a nonstop talker whose verbal stream of consciousness was festooned with unexpected detours, impromptu theories, hilarious asides, and astounding anecdotes, some of them true."

== Later years ==
In the 1990s, Sayle made a documentary, Last Train Across Canada, for PBS station WNET in the New York area. In 2004, he returned to Australia, where he was later diagnosed with Parkinson's disease. In May 2007, the University of Sydney awarded him an honorary doctorate of letters for his work as a foreign correspondent. In the same year, he was awarded the Medal of the Order of Australia in the Queen's Birthday Honours, for service to media and communications, particularly as a foreign and war correspondent. Sayle died in September 2010 at the age of 84.
