= Aikawa, Kanagawa =

Aikawa 愛川町
- Town
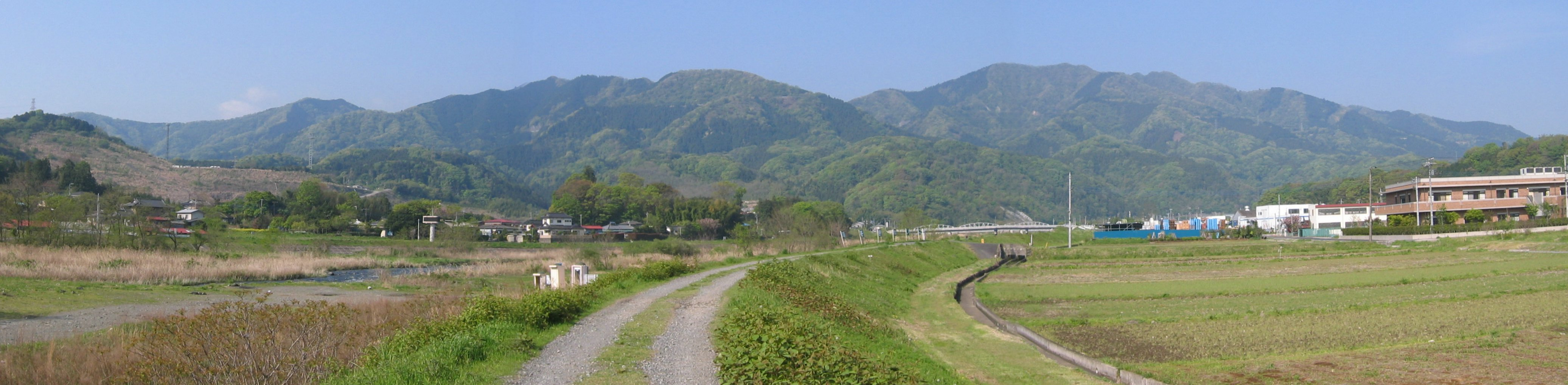
- View of Aikawa Town

- Flag Seal

- Location of Aikawa in Kanagawa Prefecture

- Coordinates: 35°31′44″N 139°19′18″E
- Country: Japan
- Region: Kantō
- Prefecture: Kanagawa
- District: Aikō

Area
  - Total: 34.29 km^{2} (13.24 sq mi)

Population (April 1, 2021)
  - Total: 39,763
  - Density: 1,160/km^{2} (3,003/sq mi)
- Time zone: UTC+9 (Japan Standard Time)
- Town symbols
  - Tree: Maple
  - Flower: Azalea
  - Bird: Common kingfisher
- Phone number: 046-285-2111
- Address: 251-1 Kakuda, Aikawa-machi, Aikō-gun, Kanagawa-ken; 243-0392
- Website: Official website

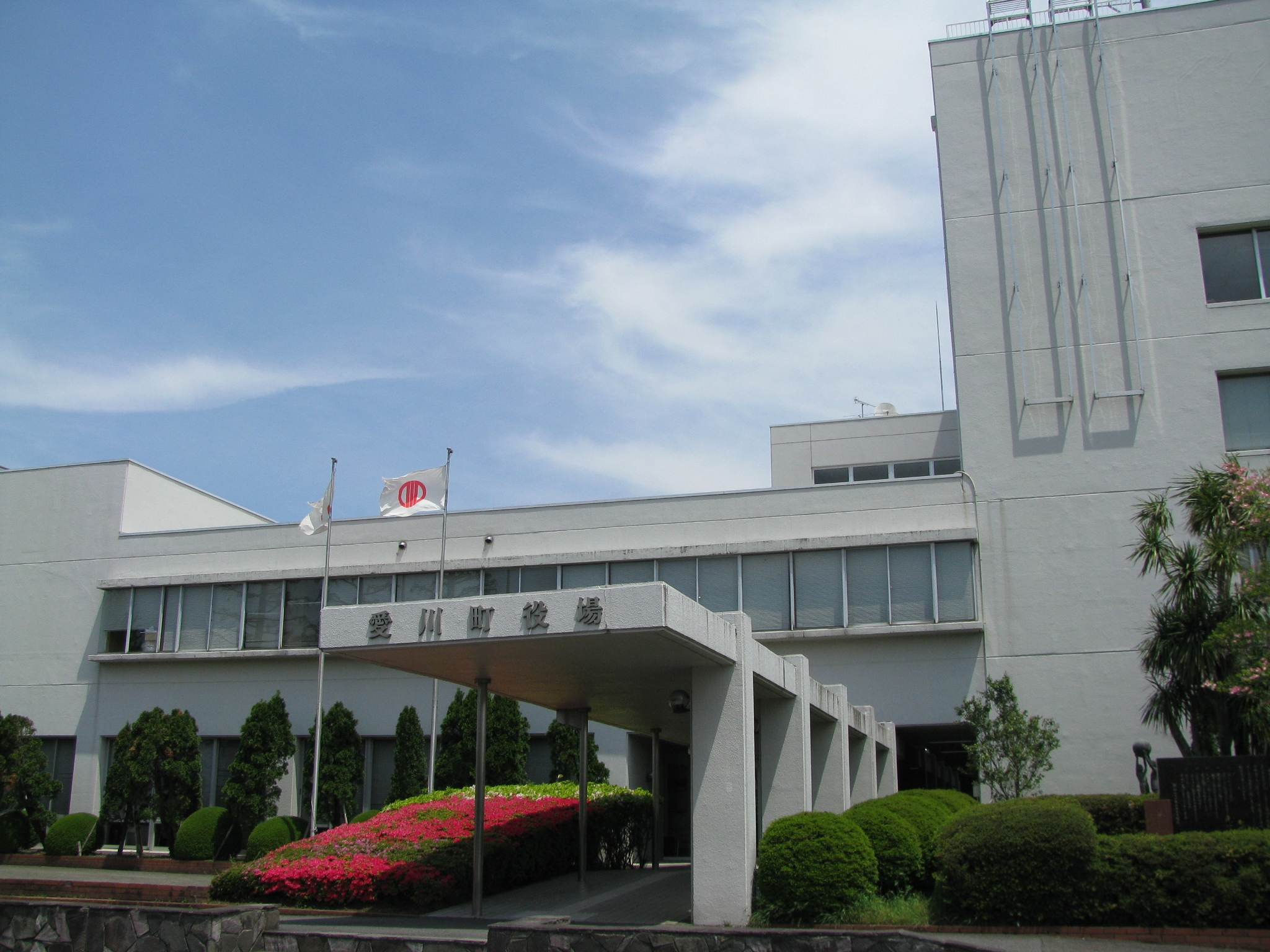
Aikawa Town Hall

Aikawa (愛川町, Aikawa-machi) is a town located in Kanagawa Prefecture, Japan. As of 1 April 2021, the town had an estimated population of 39,763 and a population density of 1200 persons per km^{2}. The total area of the town is 34.29 square kilometres (13.24 sq mi).

== Geography ==
Aikawa is located in the foothills of northern Kanagawa Prefecture. The Nakatsu River, a tributary of the Sagami River, flows through. A portion of the Tanzawa Mountains can be found in the western part of the town. Miyagase Dam, a major source of hydroelectric power, is situated on the Nakatsu River. The highest mountain in Aikawa is Mount Takatori.

=== Neighboring municipalities ===
Kanagawa Prefecture

- Atsugi
- Kiyokawa
- Sagamihara

=== Climate ===
Aikawa has a humid subtropical climate (Köppen Cfa) characterized by warm summers and cool winters with light to no snowfall. The average annual temperature in Aikawa is 13.5 °C. The average annual rainfall is 1906 mm with September as the wettest month. The temperatures are highest on average in August, at around 24.5 °C, and lowest in January, at around 2.3 °C.

== Demographics ==
Per Japanese census data, the population of Aikawa grew rapidly during the late 20th century and has plateaued in the 21st.

Historical population
Year	Pop.	±%
1920	10,238	—
1930	11,031	+7.7%
1940	12,908	+17.0%
1950	14,767	+14.4%
1960	13,721	−7.1%
1970	18,436	+34.4%
1980	29,873	+62.0%
1990	40,424	+35.3%
2000	42,760	+5.8%
2010	42,089	−1.6%
2020	39,869	−5.3%

== History ==
During the Sengoku period, the Battle of Mimasetoge between the forces of Takeda Shingen and the later Hōjō clan occurred on what is now Aikawa Town. During the Edo period, the area was tenryō territory under direct control of the Tokugawa shogunate. After the Meiji Restoration, Aikawa village was founded on April 4, 1889, with the establishment of the modern municipalities system. It was elevated to town status on April 1, 1940. The Imperial Japanese Army established the Sagami Airfield in Aikawa, which was also adjacent to military factories in Sagamihara, an officer's training school in Zama, and numerous Army and Imperial Japanese Navy facilities in Atsugi and Yokohama. On January 15, 1955, Aikawa merged with neighboring Takamine Village and on September 30, 1956, with neighboring Nakatsu Village. In 1966, an industrial park was built on the site of the former airfield and military facilities.

== Government ==
Aikawa has a mayor-council form of government with a directly elected mayor and a unicameral town council of 16 members. Aikawa, together with neighboring Kiyokawa, contributes one member to the Kanagawa Prefectural Assembly. In terms of national politics, the town is part of Kanagawa 16th district of the lower house of the Diet of Japan.

== Economy ==
Aikawa has a mixed economy, supported by agriculture and light/precision industries. Makino Milling Machines has a factory in Aikawa, as does Asahi Glass Co., NHK Spring Company, Merck Pharmaceuticals and Mitsubishi Motors. The town also serves as a bedroom community for neighboring Sagamihara and Atsugi.

== Education ==
Aikawa has six public elementary schools and three public middle schools operated by the town government. The town does not have a high school.

== Internationalization ==
Ratio of Japanese/Foreign Nationals in Aikawa Town(2023.4.1)
1. Japanese nationality: 36,350 (91.9%)
2. Foreign nationality: 3,220 (8.13%)
Percentage of foreigners living in Aikawa Town by country/region (2023)
1. Peru: 700 (22.2%)
2. Brazil: 463 (14.7%)
3. Vietnam: 441 (14.0%)
4. Philippine: 416 (13.2%)
5. Sri Lanka: 229 (7.27%)
6. Thailand: 152 (4.82%)
7. China: 118 (3.74%)
8. Indonesia: 102 (3.24%)
9. South Korea: 28 (0.88%)
10. Nepal: 28 (0.88%)
11. India: 9 (0.28%)
12. Taiwan: 5 (0.15%)
13. United States: 3 (0.09%)
14. Others: 453 (14.4%)

Aikawa town has a population of just under 40,000, which is relatively small for a municipality in Kanagawa Prefecture, but the percentage of foreign residents is high. The percentage of foreign residents, approximately 7.5% of the total population, is the highest in Kanagawa Prefecture, ahead of other international cities such as Yokohama. In addition to South America and Asia, people from 48 countries and regions, including European and African countries, have settled in Aikawa.

One reason for the large number of foreign residents in Aikawa is thought to be the demand for labor in the Aikawa Inland Industrial Park, one of the largest industrial parks in Kanagawa Prefecture, which was completed in 1966. In addition, the Planning and Policy Division of Aikawa Town cites the 1990 amendment to the Immigration Control Act as a turning point in the increase of foreign residents. Despite the Lehman Shock in 2008, the Great East Japan Earthquake in 2011, and the spread of the new coronavirus in 2020, the number of foreign residents in Aikawa has continued to increase.

A large Vietnamese Buddhist temple, Chua Vietnam, is located in Aikawa Town. In addition to Chua Vietnam, there is also "the Cambodian Cultural Center in Japan, which was planned as a Theravada Buddhist temple and cultural center for Cambodians living in Japan; "the Lao Cultural Center in Japan", which is considered the only Lao Buddhist temple in Japan for Laotians living in Japan; and "Wat Rakhang Japan", a branch temple of Wat Rakhang, known as the Bell Temple in Thailand for Thai residents in Japan.

== Transportation ==
=== Railway ===
Aikawa does not have any passenger railway service.

=== Highway ===
- National Route 412

== Noted people from Aikawa ==
- Takanori Gomi, martial artist
- Hiroya, professional kick-boxer
- Murray Sayle, journalist
- Daisuke Watanabe, actor
