= Nam Từ Liêm district =

Nam Từ Liêm district Quận Nam Từ Liêm
- Urban district
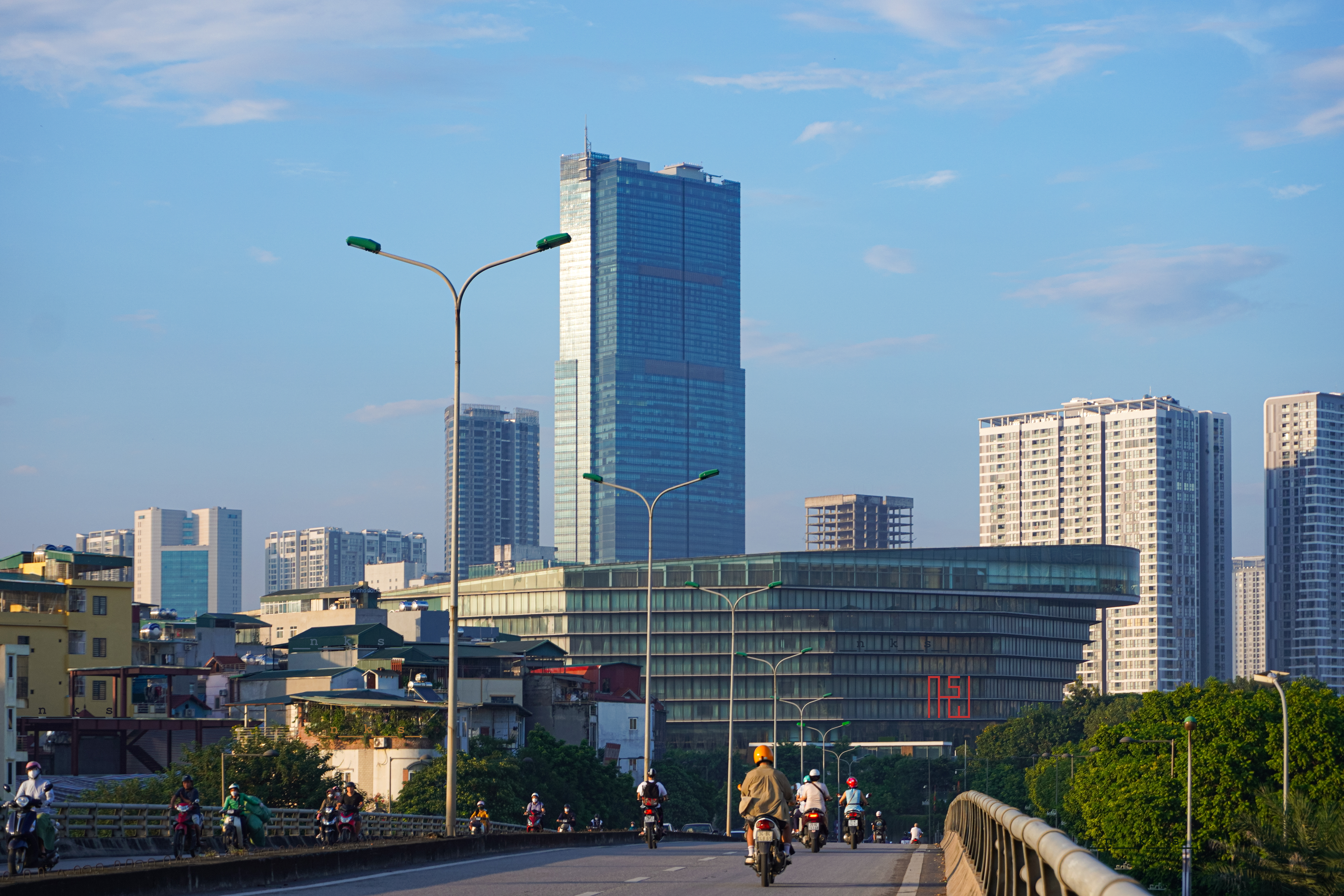
- AON Landmark 72 and JW Marriott Hanoi hotel seen from Me Tri overpass
- Nickname: The Racing Round
- Interactive map of Nam Từ Liêm district
- Country: Vietnam
- Province: Hanoi
- Established: 2013
- Seat: Cầu Diễn ward
- Wards: 10 wards

Government
  - Type: Urban district

Area
  - Total: 32.19 km^{2} (12.43 sq mi)

Population (2019)
  - Total: 264,246
  - Density: 8,209/km^{2} (21,260/sq mi)
- Time zone: UTC+7 (ICT)
- Area code: 24
- Climate: Cwa
- Website: Official website (in Vietnamese)

Nam Từ Liêm (South Từ Liêm) is an urban district (quận) of Hanoi, the capital city of Vietnam.

== History ==
Nam Từ Liêm was formed on 27 December 2013, when the rural Từ Liêm district was split into two urban districts: Bắc Từ Liêm and Nam Từ Liêm.

== Geography ==
=== Topography ===
Nam Từ Liêm urban district is divided into 10 wards (phường): Cầu Diễn, Đại Mỗ, Mễ Trĩ, Mỹ Đình 1, Mỹ Đình 2, Phú Đô, Phương Canh, Tây Mỗ, Trung Văn, Xuân Phương.

Nam Từ Liêm coverts a total area of 32.19 square kilometres (12.43 sq mi). The district is known for its many new urban developments and several skyscrapers.

The district is bordered by Bắc Từ Liêm to the north, Cầu Giấy to the east, Thanh Xuân to the southeast, Hà Đông to the south and Hoài Đức to the west.

Besides, Mỹ Đình Bus Station is a major bus terminal in western Hanoi, with metropolitan buses and long distance buses to provinces north and northwest of Hanoi.

=== Population ===
As of 2019, there were 264,246 people residing in Nam Từ Liêm urban district, the population density is 8200 inhabitants per square kilometer.

== Culture ==
=== Education ===
- Japanese School of Hanoi
- Vietnam-Australia School, Hanoi

=== Landscapes ===
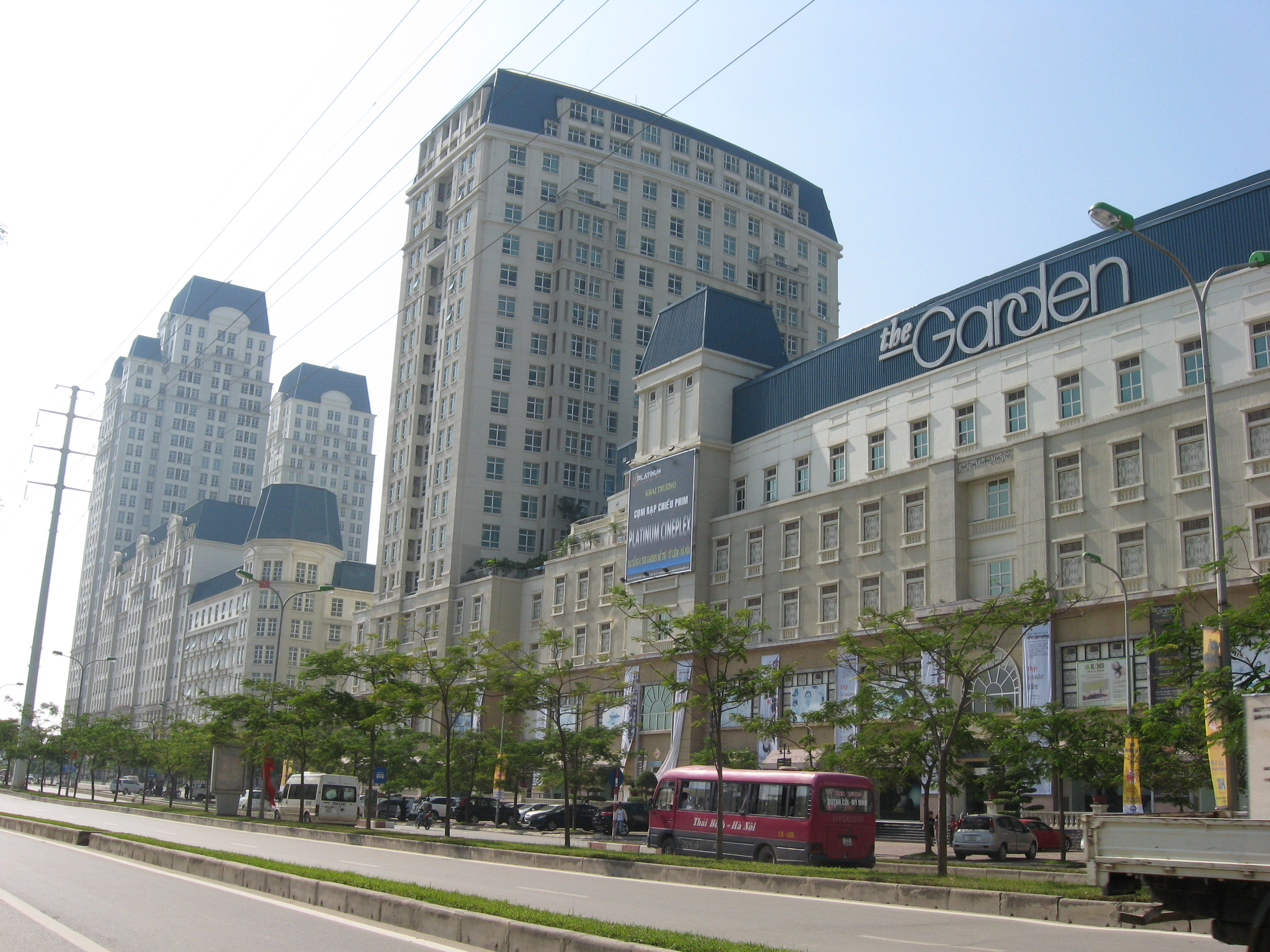
A new urban township in Nam Từ Liêm

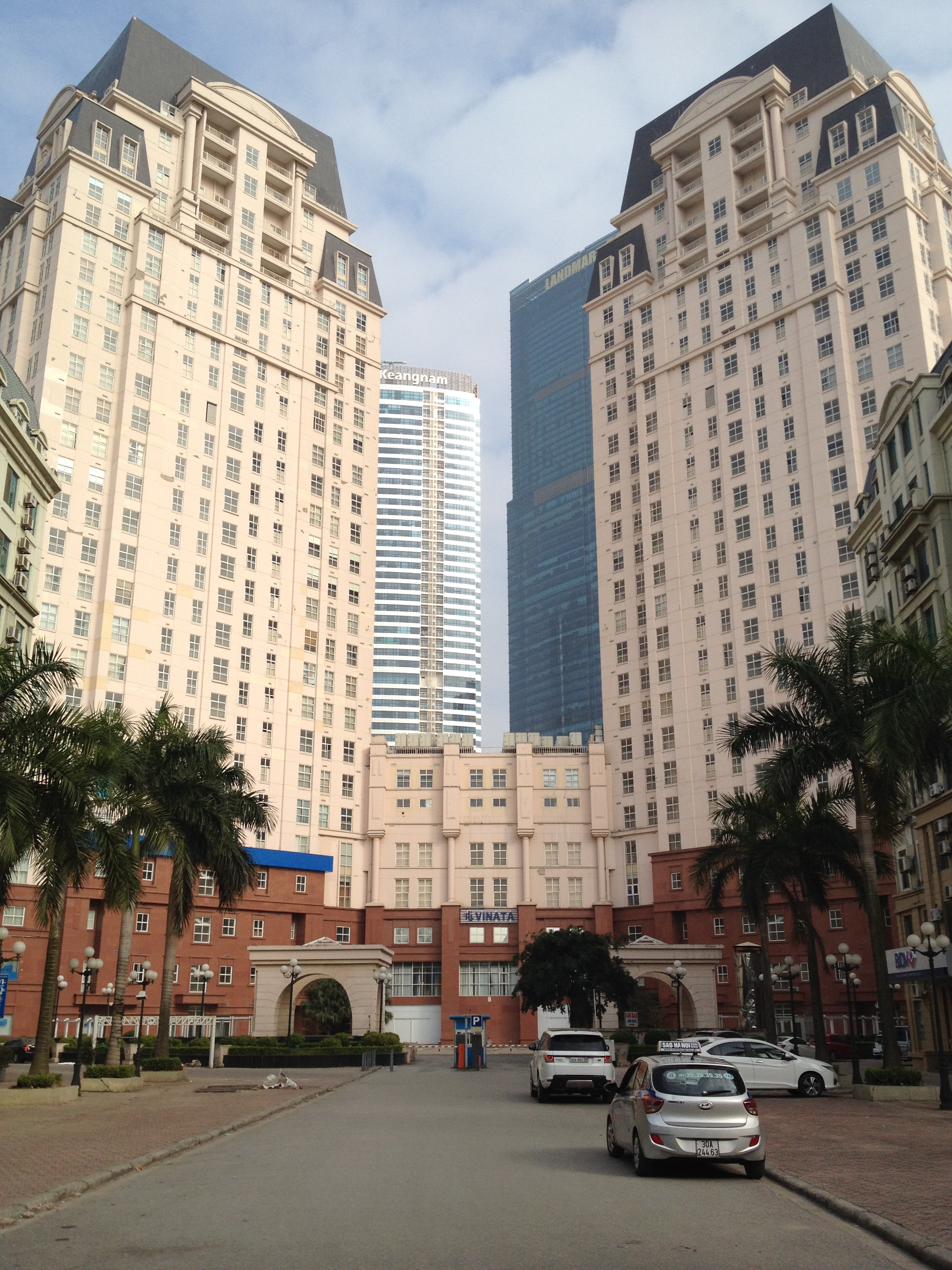
The Manor township

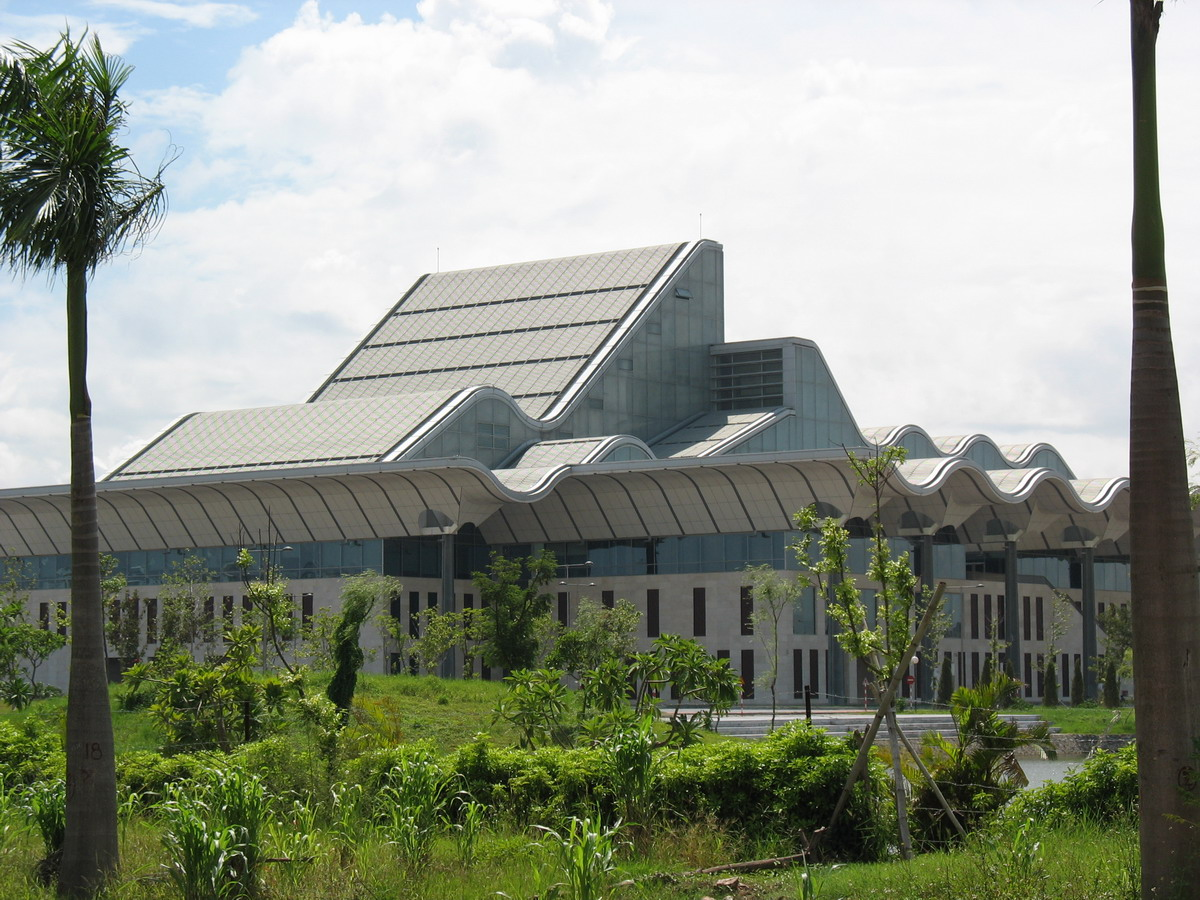
Vietnam National Convention Center

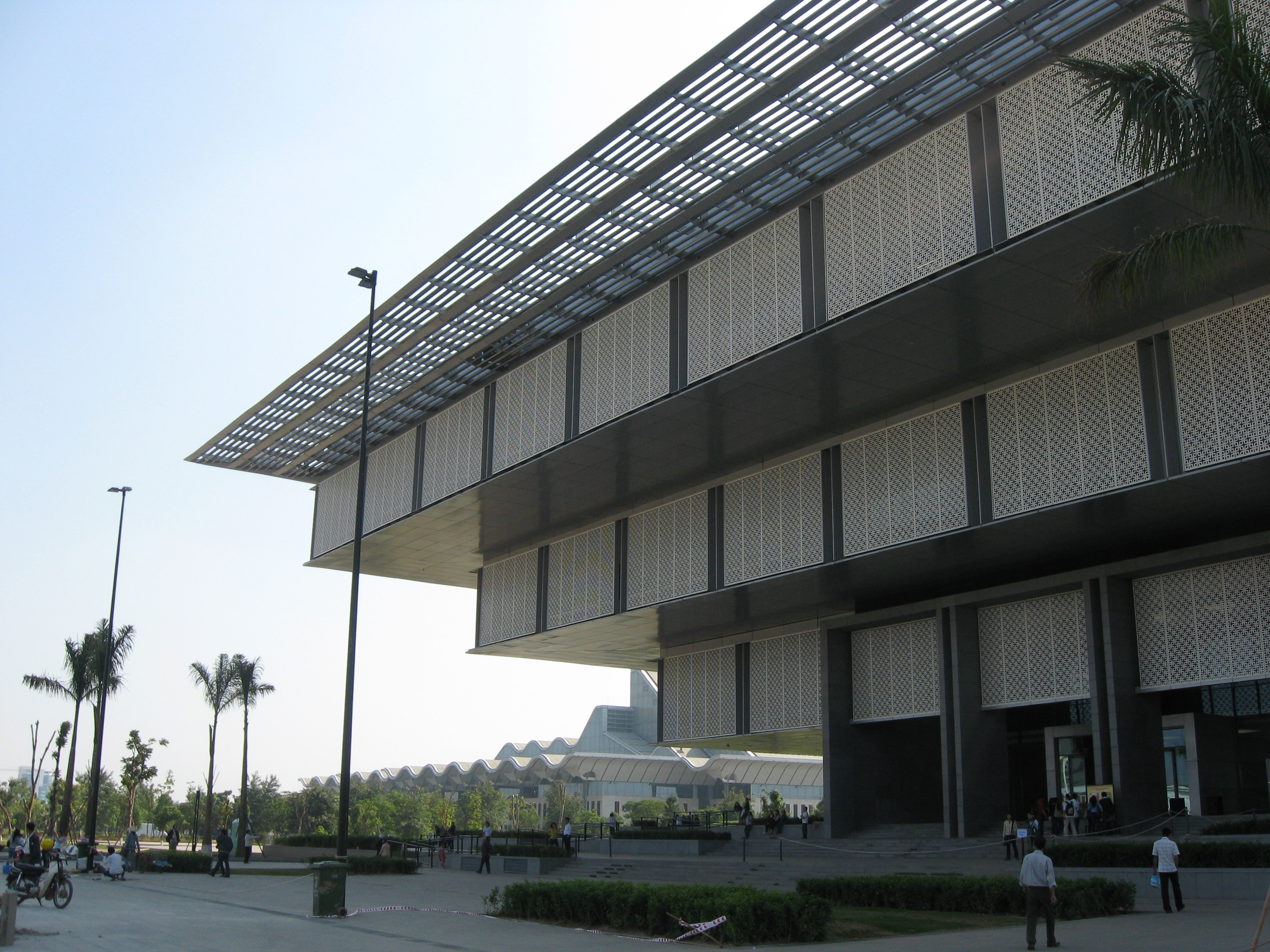
Hanoi Museum

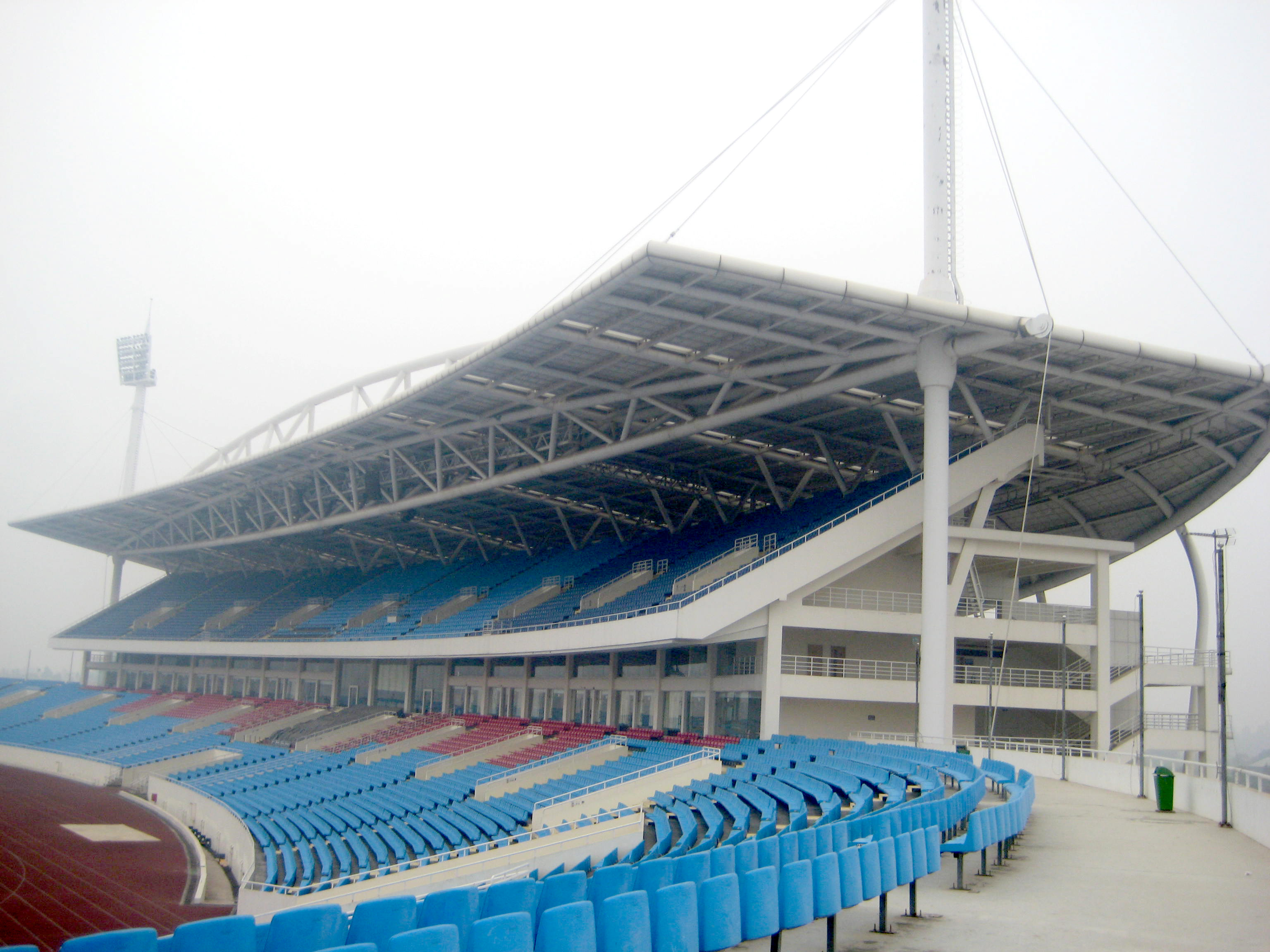
Mỹ Đình National Stadium

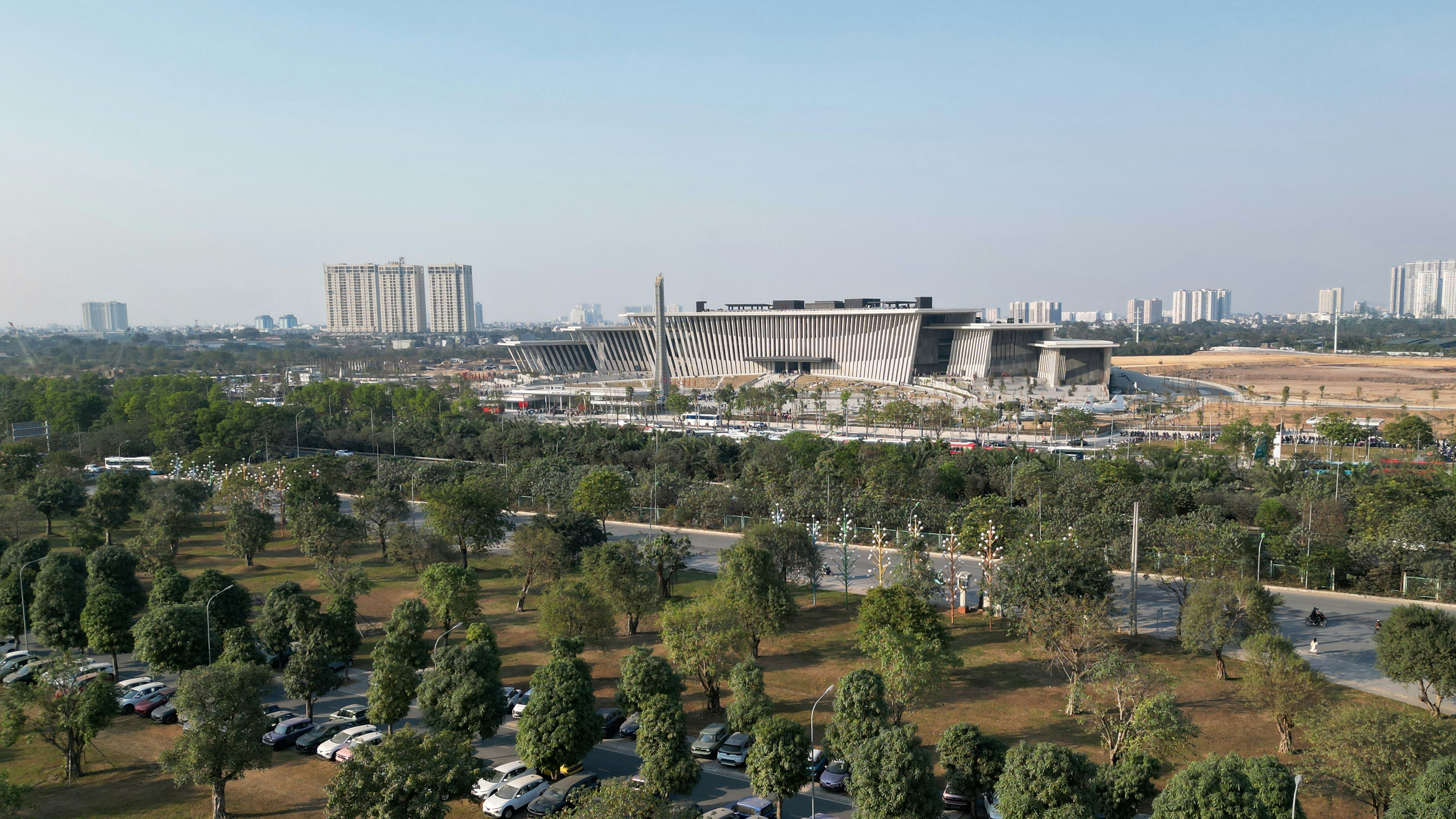
Vietnam Military History Museum

== See also ==
- Bắc Từ Liêm district
- Cầu Giấy district
- Thanh Xuân district
