= Shirahama Kenki =

Japanese pirate

- 白濱顕貴
- Occupation: Pirate
- Years active: Late 16th-early 17th centuries
- Known for: One of the first Japanese with whom the southern Vietnamese kingdom of the Nguyễn lords made contact
- Piratical career
- Base of operations: Vietnam

Shirahama Kenki (白濱顕貴, Viet: Bạch Tân Hiển Quý) was a Japanese pirate of the late 16th-early 17th centuries, one of the first Japanese with whom the southern Vietnamese principality of the Nguyễn lords made contact.

He first arrived on the Vietnamese coast in 1585, with five ships, and began to engage in pirate raids and coastal assaults. He was eventually driven off by a fleet of at least ten ships led by the sixth son of Lord Nguyễn Hoàng; two of the pirate ships were destroyed, and Shirahama fled. It is said that he was mistaken for a Westerner by the Vietnamese he encountered at the time.

Fourteen years later, in 1599, Shirahama's craft was wrecked near the port of Thuận An. The local magistrate, correctly believing him to be some variety of pirate or brigand, attacked Shirahama and was killed. Shirahama was then imprisoned, and Nguyễn Hoàng sent a missive to Tokugawa Ieyasu, new shōgun of Japan, asking how to deal with Japanese sailors in the future. This was the first official contact between the two governments, and marked the beginning of a friendly relationship lasting several decades.
