= Vietnamese people in Japan =

Vietnamese people in Japan 在日ベトナム人 Người Việt tại Nhật Bản
Total population
- 681,100 (in December, 2025)

Regions with significant populations
- Tokyo, Osaka (Ikuno-ku), Yokohama, Kobe (Nagata-ku, Hyogo-ku)

Languages
- Japanese, Languages of Vietnam

Religion
- Vietnamese folk religion, Buddhism, Catholicism, Shintoism

Related ethnic groups
- Vietnamese people

Vietnamese people in Japan (在日ベトナム人, Zainichi Betonamujin) (Vietnamese: Người Việt tại Nhật Bản) are a multiethnic diaspora community in Japan comprises people of Vietnamese origin. They form Japan's second-largest community of foreign residents ahead of Koreans in Japan and behind Chinese in Japan, according to the statistics of the Ministry of Justice. In December, 2025, there were 681,100 legal residents. Whereas, in 2007, there were only about 35,000 Vietnamese legally living in Japan. At that time, the majority of Vietnamese legal residents lived in the Kantō region and Keihanshin area.

== Migration history ==
A letter dating from 1591 mentions two Vietnamese merchants/agents/diplomats named Chen Liangshan (陳梁山) and Longyan (隆厳) arrived in Japan and offered to the "King of Japan" (addressed as 日本国国王) Vietnamese exotic goods.

In 1609, an official trading ship owned by Suminokura Soan was shipwrecked on its return trip, along with 105 crew members, off the shores of the straits of Dan Nhai. Taking pity on these merchants who were suffering far from home, the king of Annam had ordered the Marquis de Van Ly (Văn Lý hầu) Tran, along with the duke of Thu county (Thư quận công) and the Marquis de Quang Phu (Quảng Phú hầu), to distribute rations to the victims. The marquises then appealed to the king for food, clothing, and a large ship for the victims.

In the same year, the Japanese government had granted three permits for merchant ships to sail to Cochinchina in central Vietnam. This letter thus serves as proof that many merchant ships had sailed to Vietnam under the government-sanctioned maritime trade system. It also provides evidence of the friendly relations between the two nations during that period.

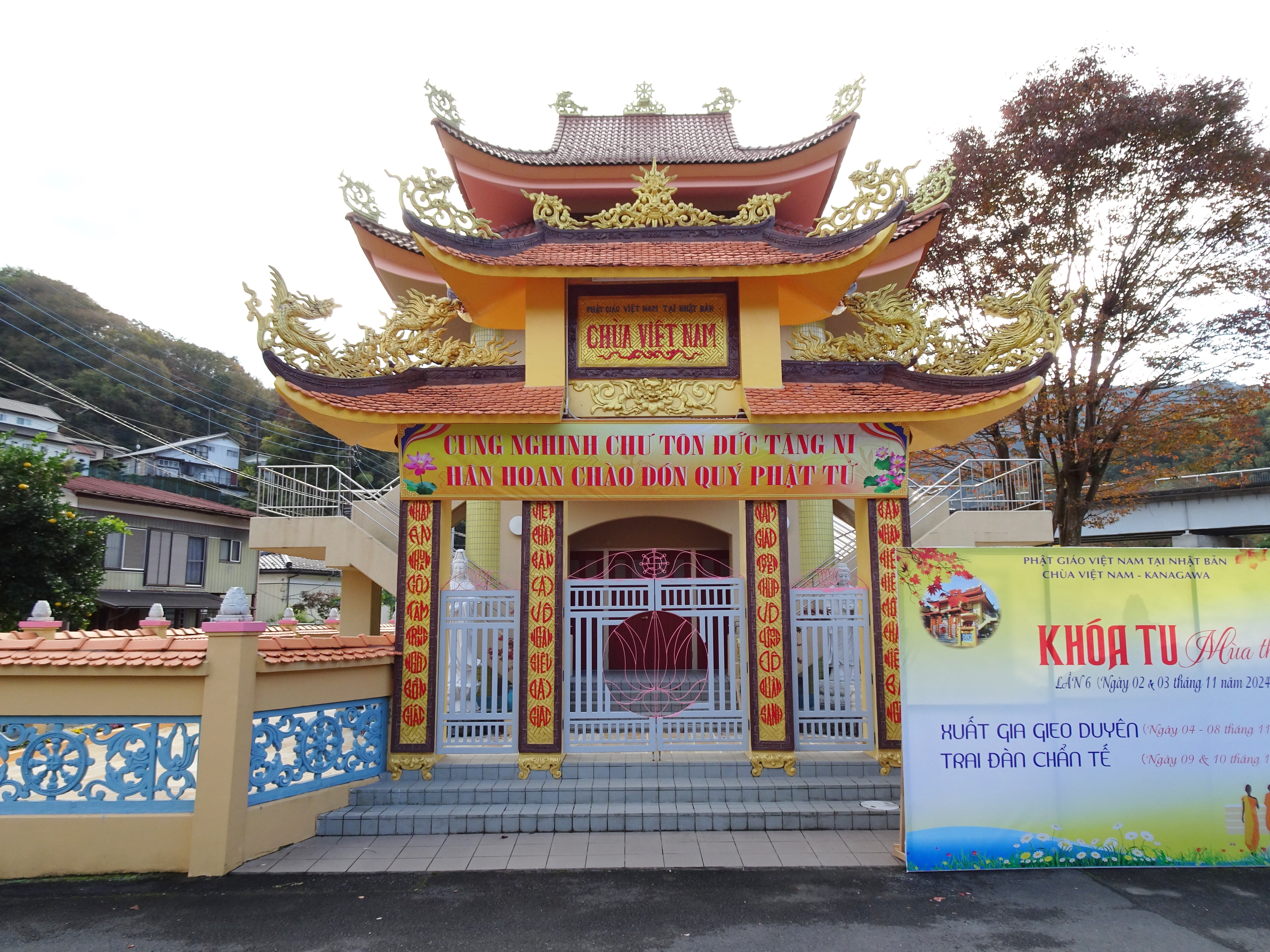
Chua Vietnam, Vietnamese temple in Kanagawa

Large numbers of Vietnamese students began to choose Japan as a destination in the early 20th century, spurred by the exiled prince Cường Để and the Đông Du Movement (literally, "Travel East movement" or "Eastern Travel movement") he and Phan Bội Châu pioneered. By 1908, 200 Vietnamese students had gone to study at Japanese universities. However, the community of Vietnamese people in Japan is dominated by Vietnam War refugees and their families, who compose about 70% of the total population. Japan began to accept refugees from Vietnam in the late 1970s. The policy of accepting foreign migrants marked a significant break from Japan's post-World War II orientation towards promoting and maintaining racial homogeneity. Most of these migrants settled in Kanagawa and Hyōgo prefectures, the locations of the initial resettlement centres. As they moved out of the resettlement centres, they often gravitated to Zainichi Korean-dominated neighbourhoods; however, they feel little sense of community with Zainichi Koreans, seeing them not as fellow ethnic minorities but as part of the mainstream.

Guest workers began to follow the refugees to Japan in the so-called "third wave" of Vietnamese migration beginning in the 1990s. As contract workers returned home to Vietnam from the countries of the former Eastern Bloc, which by then had begun their transition away from Communism, they began to look for other foreign destinations in which they could earn good incomes, and Japan proved attractive due to its nearby location and high standard of living. By the end of 1994, the annual number of Vietnamese workers going to Japan totalled 14,305 individuals, mostly under industrial traineeship visas. In contrast to other labour-exporting countries in Southeast Asia, the vast majority of migrants were men, due to the Vietnamese government's restrictions on migration for work in traditionally female-dominated fields such as domestic work or entertainment.

During the COVID-19 pandemic, travel between Japan and Vietnam was restricted, temporarily halting migration.

== Integration ==
The refugees have suffered various difficulties adjusting to Japanese society, especially in the areas of education and employment; their attendance rate in senior high school is estimated to be only 40%, as compared to 96.6% for Japanese nationals, a fact attributed both to the refugees' lack of Japanese language proficiency as well as the schools' own inability to adjust to the challenges of educating students with different cultural backgrounds. Tensions have also arisen between migrants admitted to Japan as adults, and 1.5 or 2nd-generation children born or educated in Japan, due to language barriers and differences in culture; the former feel the latter are too reserved and distant, while the latter deride the former for their poor Japanese language skills. Most Vietnamese do not take on Japanese names, or prefer to use their Vietnamese names even if they have a Japanese name, though they feel a Japanese name may be necessary for job-seeking and they sometimes complain of being teased for having "katakana names".

The Roman Catholic Church quickly came to play an important role in their community.

== Notable individuals ==
- Cường Để, Vietnamese revolutionary and royal relative of Nguyễn
- Phong Chi, female idol (Vietnamese parents, raised in Japan)
- Jun Nguyen-Hatsushiba, artist (Vietnamese father)
- Yūki Tai, voice actor (Vietnamese/Japanese parent)
- Masato Seto, Japanese Thai photographer (Born to a Thai mother of Vietnamese descent and a Japanese father)

== See also ==
- Japan–Vietnam relations
- Vietnamese diaspora
- Ethnic groups of Japan
- Japanese people in Vietnam
