= Japanese language education in Vietnam =

Japanese language education in Vietnam first became widespread during the Empire of Vietnam, which was set up as a puppet state after Japan's 1941 World War II invasion of French Indochina. However, after Japan's 1945 surrender and withdrawal from Vietnam, there was little further education in the language until the 1970s. A 2006 survey showed 1,037 teachers teaching 29,982 students at 110 different institutions, an increase of 66% in the number of students since the previous year's survey. As of 2024, according to the Japan Foundation, 164,495 people were learning Japanese in Vietnam.

== In the Empire of Vietnam ==
Japan's invasion of Indochina began in September 1940; by July of the following year, they had reached the southern end of Vietnam. However, courses in Japanese were not established until March 1942, largely under the direction of semi-private associations such as the Japanese Residents' Association (日本人会). By April 1943, education in Japanese as a second language was being conducted in Hanoi, Haiphong, and Saigon targeted not only at Vietnamese people, but local ethnic Chinese and French people as well. In Hanoi, the authorities set up two night courses, one in a primary school and one in a Chinese middle school; the courses offered only three contact hours per week of instruction. 1,000 students attended the classes. The courses in Haiphong was more intense, with ten contact hours per week; a total of 270 students enrolled. Saigon featured the largest concentration of courses; seven schools, including the Saigon Japanese School (サイゴン日本語学校), the Affiliated Japanese School of Nanyō Gakuen (南洋学院附属日本語学校) and the Kyōei Japanese Academy (共栄日語学院) offered courses from three to twelve hours per week, enrolling a total of 900 students. The total number of students was reported by local newspapers to have grown to 2,500 by May 1944.

The teaching materials, locally published after the invasion, were written largely in romanisation or katakana and aimed at comprehension of simple spoken language. Motivations for study included the need to communicate and do business with the occupying troops, the desire to find jobs in Japanese-managed companies which began setting up offices in Vietnam, and for civil servants, the administrative needs of the new government. After the Japanese withdrawal, the need for the language disappeared, along with the teaching staff for the schools. However, some people educated in Japanese during this era would go on to play a role in the revival of Japanese language teaching in the 1960s and 1970s, such as Nguyen Ngoc Canh, who helped the University of Foreign Trade set up the first postwar Japanese course in 1962.

== Education and industry ==
Hanoi Foreign Languages University and the University of Foreign Trade establish regular elective courses in Japanese in 1973. Ho Chi Minh City's Saigon University followed with a course in 1975. A school in Huế also began offering a course in 1993, but it closed in 2001; a course at Danang's University of Foreign Languages was found in a 2002 survey by Niigata University. Schools such as Hanoi's Chu Van An High School and Ho Chi Minh City's Le Quy Don School began offering the language to senior high school students in 2003. Chu Van An School also extended its Japanese language teaching to its junior high school students later that year, making it the first school to offer a Japanese course to students at that level; aimed at seventh graders, the course met twice per week and used textbooks donated by the Japanese government.

The Vietnam Software Association (VINASA) foresee a major shortfall in the number of proficient Japanese speakers relative to the needs of their industry; they projected that 18,000 programmers would be needed if they hoped to meet their target of capturing 10% of the Japanese outsourcing market, but as of 2004, the country only had 500 information technology who could speak Japanese. The average salary of a new university graduate working in the IT industry in Vietnam was VND2 million/month as of 2006; a graduate with proficiency in Japanese could earn VND3.2 million/month in Vietnam, but with wages of Vietnamese programmers working in Japan through manpower agencies from four to twelve times that amount, most Japanese-speaking IT staff prefer to work in Japan.

Various tie-ups between industry and universities have resulted as companies seek to resolve their labour issues; VINASA are working with Hanoi's FPT University to set up a Japanese language programme for students of the university's embedded software faculty, while Japanese software development corporation Sorun plans to open a Japanese language school in a joint venture with the Ho Chi Minh City University of Technology, with the aim of reducing their own shortage of engineers; they plan to sponsor the top 10 graduates to come to Japan to work at their Tokyo headquarters. Similarly, NEC set up a job centre to match Japanese-speaking people in Vietnam with Japanese companies seeking employees, aiming to find 300 employees by 2010; however, in 6 months, they only managed to match 8 people.

== Standardised testing ==
JLPT examinees in Vietnam
Year	City	Examinees by Level				
Year	City	L1	L2	L3	L4	Total
2006	Hanoi	220	971	1151	198	2540
2006	Ho Chi Minh City	251	1766	2594	894	5505
2005	Hanoi	171	615	495	159	1440
2005	Ho Chi Minh City	204	1134	1979	491	3808
2004	Hanoi	138	501	259	94	992
2004	Ho Chi Minh City	143	760	1239	430	2572
2003	Hanoi	108	457	253	89	907
2003	Ho Chi Minh City	112	591	863	248	1814
2002	Hanoi	Data missing				
2002	Ho Chi Minh City	Data missing				
2001	Hanoi	81	335	146	11	573
2001	Ho Chi Minh City	82	375	691	336	1483
2000	Hanoi	81	261	143	14	499
2000	Ho Chi Minh City	72	325	726	336	1459
1999	Hanoi	62	293	132	31	518
1998	Hanoi	-	-	-	-	424

The Japanese Language Proficiency Test was first offered in Hanoi; an additional test site was added in Ho Chi Minh City in 2000, which in its first year received almost triple the number of examinees as the Hanoi site. The number of examinees in 2006 was almost triple the 2003 total, and nineteen times the 1998 total. Until 2005, the pattern of examinees differed between the two cities, with the Level 2 examination, aimed at students who have completed 600 contact hours of instruction, being most popular in Hanoi, while the easier the Level 3 examinations, aimed at students who have completed 300 contact hours of instruction, received the largest number of examinees in Ho Chi Minh City. This changed in 2006, the Level 3 examination was the most widely attempted in both cities. Most graduates of university-level Japanese courses take the Level 2 examination, which is demanded by factories selling products to Japanese buyers; however, employers in the hospitality and tourism industry feel Level 3 examinees possess sufficient ability to deal with their job requirements. JETRO's Business Japanese Proficiency Test was not offered in Vietnam as of 2006.

== See also ==
- Education in Vietnam
- Japan–Vietnam relations
- Japanese as a foreign language
- Vietnamese people in Japan
