= Vietnamese famine of 1944–1945 =

Famine in Vietnam during World War II that killed between 400,000 and 2,000,000 people

Vietnamese famine of 1944–45 Nạn đói Ất Dậu
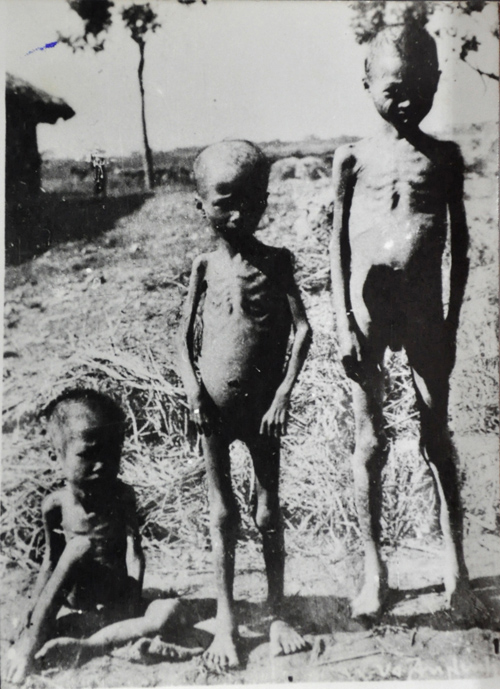
- Children in the famine
- Country: French Indochina, Empire of Vietnam
- Total deaths: 400,000—2,000,000

The Vietnamese famine of 1944–45 (Vietnamese: Nạn đói Ất Dậu – famine of the Ất Dậu Year or Nạn đói năm 45 – the '45, due to most of the deaths occurring in 1945) was a famine that occurred in northern Vietnam in French Indochina during World War II from October 1944 to late 1945, which at the time was under occupation by Japan and administration by Vichy France, a collaborator of Nazi Germany in Western Europe. Between 400,000 and 2 million people are estimated to have starved to death during this time.

== Causes ==
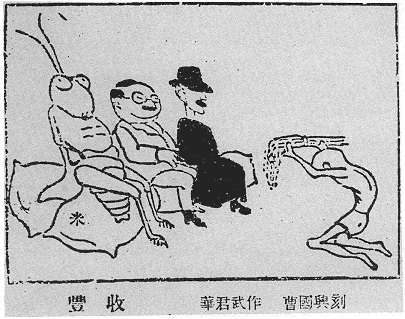
Caricatures of the policies of France, the Empire of Japan, and insect plague, the causes of the famine

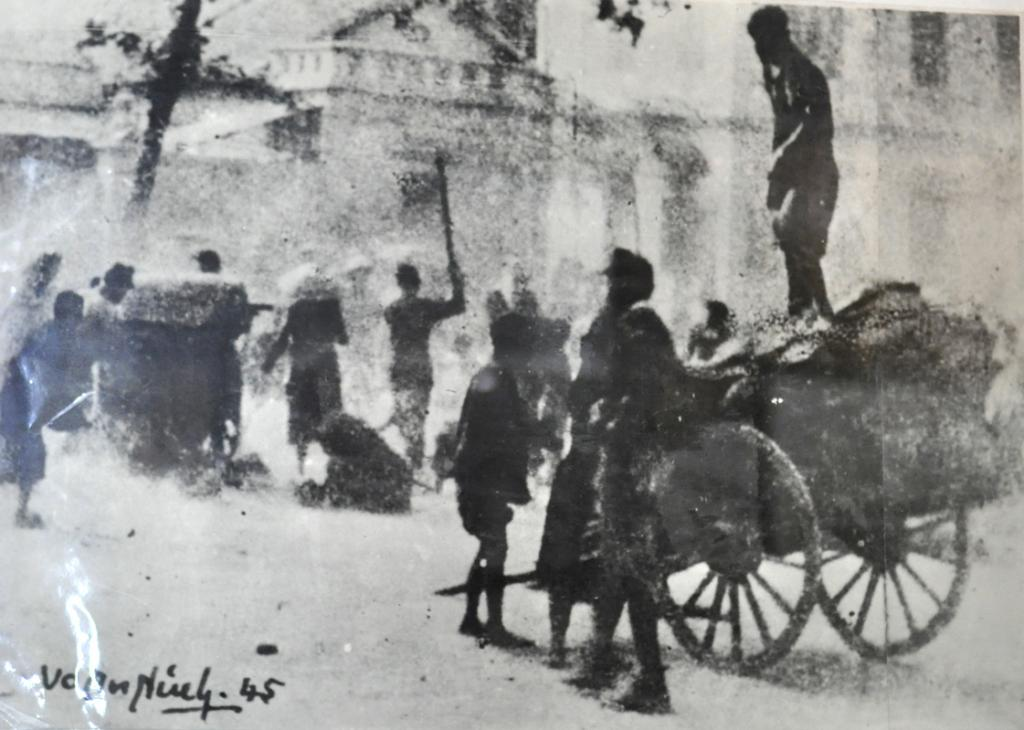
Vietnamese villagers attacking a rice warehouse built by Japanese forces during the Japanese occupation, 1945

A cause of the famine was the effects of World War II on French Indochina. The involvement of France and Japan in Vietnam had detrimental effects on the economic activities of the Vietnamese. In 1944, after US bombing had cut off supplies of coal from the north to Saigon, the French and Japanese used rice and maize as fuel for power stations. According to the diplomat Bui Minh Dung, "the Japanese occupation of Vietnam was the direct cause, in the final analysis, of several other factors, in turn affecting the famine, but their military efforts together with their economic policy for the Greater East Asia Co-Prosperity Sphere per se seem to have systematically played a role considerably greater than any other factors in the Vietnamese starvation."

The mismanagement of the French administration in Vietnam was another cause. The French reformed the economy to serve the administration and to meet the needs of war, including the Japanese occupation. They imposed a compulsory system of government rice purchases with a price ceiling of 1.40 piastres for every 10 kilograms, which they continued paying even as the market rates soared from 2.50 to 3 piastres in 1943 to 6 to 7 in June 1944. It ballooned tenfold to 60-70 piastres the following year. This meant farmers could no longer afford to repurchase rice needed for new harvests or to feed themselves.

Natural causes included natural disasters such as droughts and floods, which destroyed northern crops.

The crop failures of 1943–1945 were compounded by lack of dike maintenance after the US bombing of the north and the catastrophic rainfall of August–September 1944, causing flooding and loss of rice plants.

=== French colonial administration ===
After the Great Depression in the 1930s, France returned to its policy of economic protectorate and monopolized the exploitation of natural resources of French Indochina. The people in French Indochina had to increase the economic value of the area by growing cash crops in place of lower-value agricultural produce, but only the French, a small minority of Vietnamese and the Hoa and some people in the cities benefited.

=== World War II ===
When the war started, France was weakened. In East Asia, Japan began to expand and viewed French Indochina as a bridge into Southeast Asia and a means to isolate and further weaken the Nationalist government of China. In mid-1940, Metropolitan France was occupied by Nazi Germany. Germany's Axis partner Japan then increased pressure on France and entered French Indochina that September. Vietnam was pulled into a wartime economy, with France and Japan competing in administration, often with Japan gaining the advantages. Japanese troops forced farmers to grow jute, instead of rice, thus depriving them of needed food, but France had already started the same policy to a smaller degree. The land set aside for growing staple crops such as maize and potatoes was decreased to make land for growing cotton, jute and other industrial plants. Because of the decreased land available for growing, harvests of staple crops decreased considerably. Crops were also exported to Japan.

The militaries of both France and Japan forcibly seized food from farmers to feed their troops. By 1941, there were 140,000 Japanese troops in French Indochina in addition to the Vichy French forces. During the occupation, the Allies made frequent air strikes against roads, warehouse and transportation facilities, which made the transport of rice from the south to the north extremely difficult. In the meantime, the Vichy civilian administration was highly corrupt, dysfunctional and unable to distribute remaining food stocks to areas where needed.

In March 1945, the Japanese ousted the Vichy administration and replaced it with the Japanese-backed government of the Empire of Vietnam, headed by Trần Trọng Kim. While this new government increased efforts to alleviate the famine, the inadequate food supply and the hoarding of food by the Imperial Japanese Army made their efforts futile.

== Consequences ==
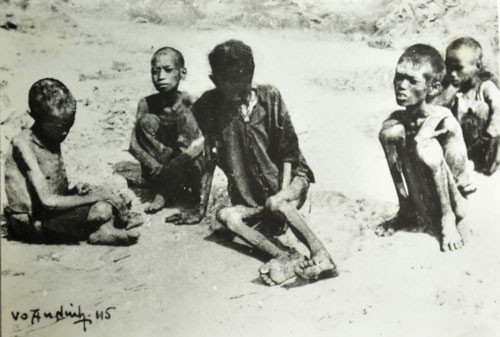
Severely malnourished village children. Impoverished villagers suffered the most from the famine.

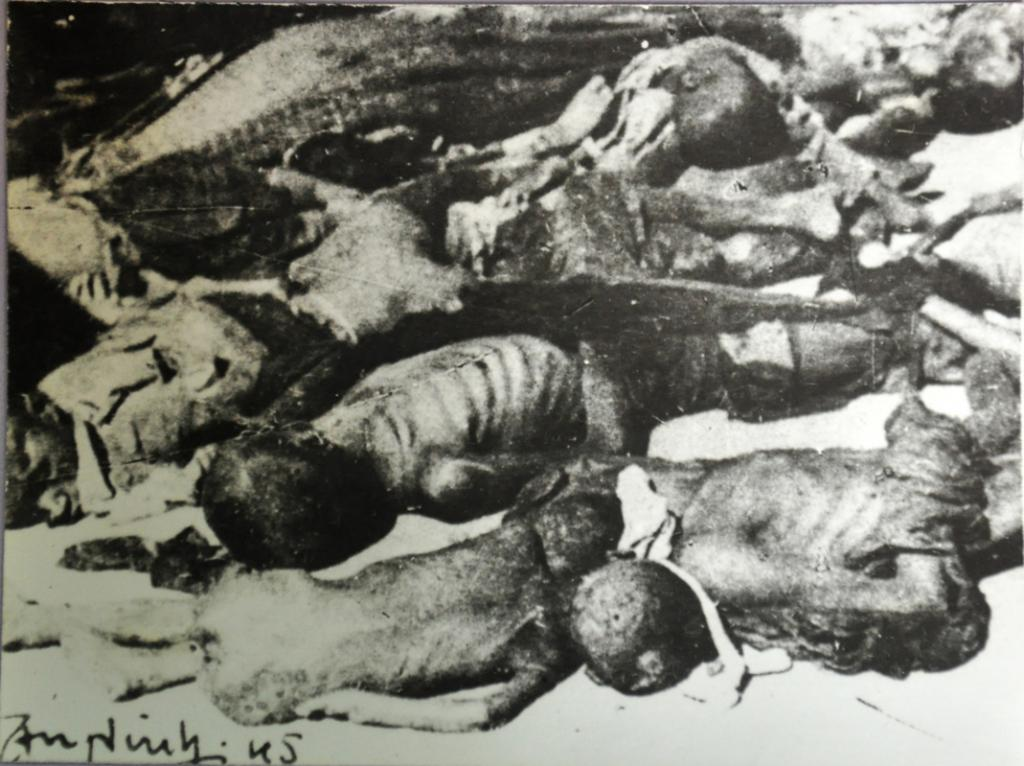
The bodies of the starving lying in the open

By early 1945, many were forced to walk from town to town in search of food. The exact number of deaths caused by the 1944–1945 famine is unknown and is a matter of controversy. Various sources estimate between 400,000 and 2 million people starved in northern Vietnam during this time. In May 1945, the envoy at Hanoi asked the northern provinces to report their casualties. Twenty provinces reported that a total of 380,000 people starved to death and 20,000 more died because of disease. In October, a report from a French military official estimated half-a-million deaths. Governor General Jean Decoux wrote in his memoirs A la barre de l'Indochine that about a million northerners had starved to death.

The Viet Minh, led by communists, successfully directed public resentment and encouraged the peasants to seize the rice granaries of the occupation powers. In response, the Japanese imposed harsh punishment upon the transgressors and sometimes even mutilated them physically, which further inflamed popular anger. In the process, the Viet Minh transformed itself from a guerilla organization into a mass movement. Ho Chi Minh, in his Proclamation of Independence of the Democratic Republic of Vietnam on 2 September 1945, would refer to the famine and quote a figure of 2 million deaths.

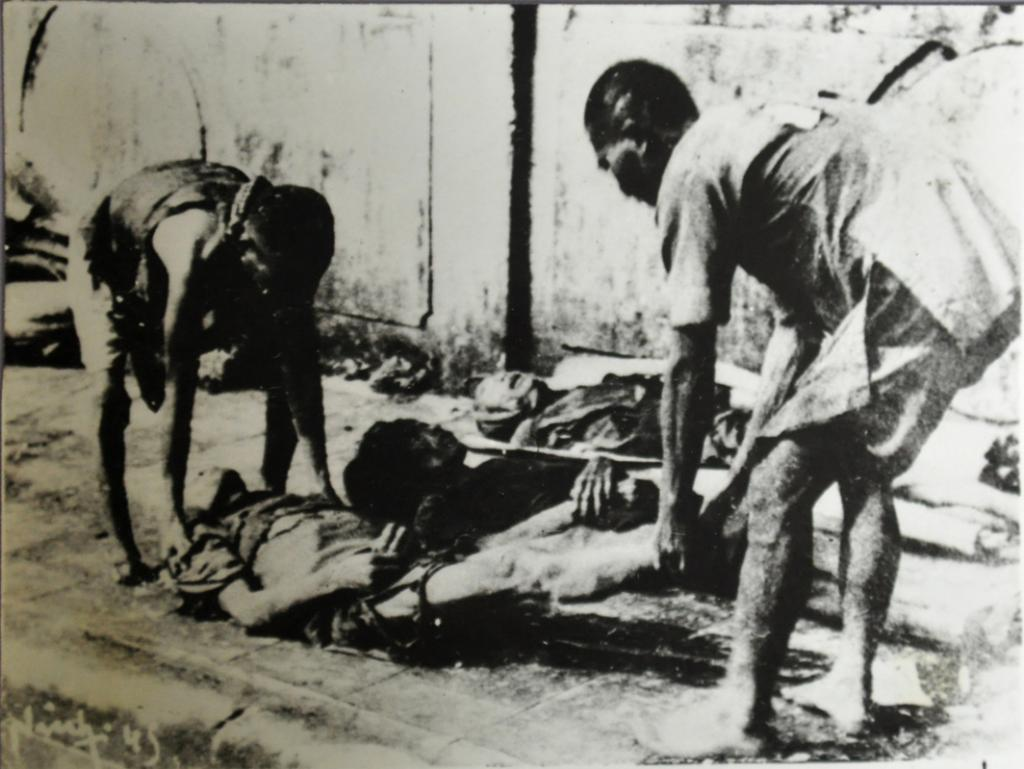
People collecting bodies to prepare for burial

According to the Việt Minh, 1 to 2 million Vietnamese starved to death in the Red River Delta of northern Vietnam because of the Japanese since they seized Vietnamese rice and failed to pay. In Phat Diem, the Vietnamese farmer Di Ho was one of the few survivors who saw the Japanese steal grain. The North Vietnamese government accused both France and Japan of the famine and said that 1–2 million Vietnamese had died. Võ An Ninh took photographs of dead and dying Vietnamese during the great famine. Starving Vietnamese died throughout northern Vietnam in 1945 from the Japanese seizure of their crops when the Chinese came to disarm the Japanese, and Vietnamese corpses were all throughout the streets of Hanoi and had to be cleaned up by students.

Despite the limited scope of operations, the American bombing and the Viet Minh's obstruction, the Tran Trong Kim's government (Empire of Vietnam) tried its best to supply rice to fight the famine. Because all ships over 30 tons were requisitioned by the Japanese, and important areas were constantly attacked by the Americans and the Allies, the transportation of rice from the South to the North was delayed. Minister of Supply Nguyen Huu Thi was sent to Saigon to arrange the transportation of rice from the South to the Central and Northern regions. Seaports far from Saigon were used as departure points to avoid American bombing. Private individuals were allowed to freely transport and trade rice. To prevent dishonest behavior, the government ordered price and inventory controls on rice. Violators could be sentenced to death or have their property confiscated. The Northern Economic Intelligence Service, headed by Nguyen Duy Que, was established to prevent smuggling. At the end of March, all the relief associations in the North gathered together to form the General Relief Association led by Nguyen Van To, and stepped up fundraising and relief efforts. From March to May, the General Association raised 783,403 dong. In the South, in May, more than 20 relief associations were established, and within a month, the above organizations raised 1,677,886 dong, including 481,570 dong to buy and transport 1,592 tons of rice for famine victims. Thanks to the good harvest in May and June 1945, and the sharp decrease in consumption demand after more than 1 million people died of starvation, the food crisis gradually eased. By June 1945, the famine had significantly decreased.

== See also ==
- Bengal famine of 1943
- Dutch famine of 1944–1945
- Greek famine
- Holodomor
- Vietnam in World War II
- Chinese famine of 1942–1943
