= Japan–Vietnam relations =

- Japan: Vietnam

Diplomatic mission
- Japanese embassy, Hanoi: Vietnamese embassy, Tokyo

Japan-Vietnam relations (Japanese: 日越関係, romanized: Nichi Etsu kankei; Vietnamese: Quan hệ Việt-Nhật) are friendly, stretching over many centuries. Both countries belonged to the Sinosphere and shared early cultural exchanges since as early as the 8th century. While the relationship cooled when Japan entered a period of self-isolation between 17th and 19th century, both countries still witnessed some degree of informal trade during this time. In the late 19th century, their paths diverged, with Japan embarking on the Meiji Restoration and Vietnam was colonized by France and integrated into the French Indochina. In 1940, Japan, now a great empire of Asia, assumed administration of Indochina and directly caused the Vietnamese famine of 1944–1945.

On August 15th, 1945, Japan surrendered to the Allies in World War II. On September 2nd, 1945, the modern state of Vietnam declared independence. Both countries, now in the opposite sides of the Cold War, entered to another period of private exchanges, North Vietnam during this time viewed Japanese economic miracle with great suspicion. After the Vietnam War in 1975, Japan assumed the role of a paternalistic foreign aid provider and played a foundational role of reforming Vietnam's economy in 1986, breaking Vietnam's isolation in the world stage and providing official development assistance (ODA) to critical infrastructure.

Now, Japan–Vietnam relations is formally classified as a comprehensive strategic partnership. Both countries have a shared cultural heritage, desire to manage China's aggression and willingness to reconcile the effect of Japanese war crimes. In strategic terms, Japan provides Vietnam economic investment in the form of ODA and naval material to guard the South China Sea. In return, Vietnam provides the homebase for Japanese manufacturing and cheap migrant workers to combat demographic aging in Japan. Generally, the Vietnamese public opinion is very favorable towards Japan for being a reliable partner and a source of popular culture. For the Japanese public, economic disparities between the two nations remain the main tension point, highlighted by the 700,000 Vietnamese migrant workers currently in Japan as of 2026.

== History ==
=== Early contact ===
In the 8th century, Abe no Nakamaro, a descendant of the Imperial House of Japan, entered the Chinese civil service under the Tang dynasty and eventually served as governor (jiedushi) of Annam from 761 to 767.

During the 8th century, the Japanese court composite ritual art comprising orchestral music and dance (Bugaku) known as Rinyu-gaku is said to have been introduced by a foreign monk named "Buttetsu" (Phật Triết) who came from Rinyu (Chăm Pa).

An archaeological dig in Kyūshū, the most southwesterly of the four main islands of Japan, revealed fragments of a Vietnamese ceramic with the inscribed date of 1330, but ended in 1332.

=== 16th to 17th century ===
An Edo-period Japanese Red Seal ship sailing out of Nagasaki for Annam (Vietnam)

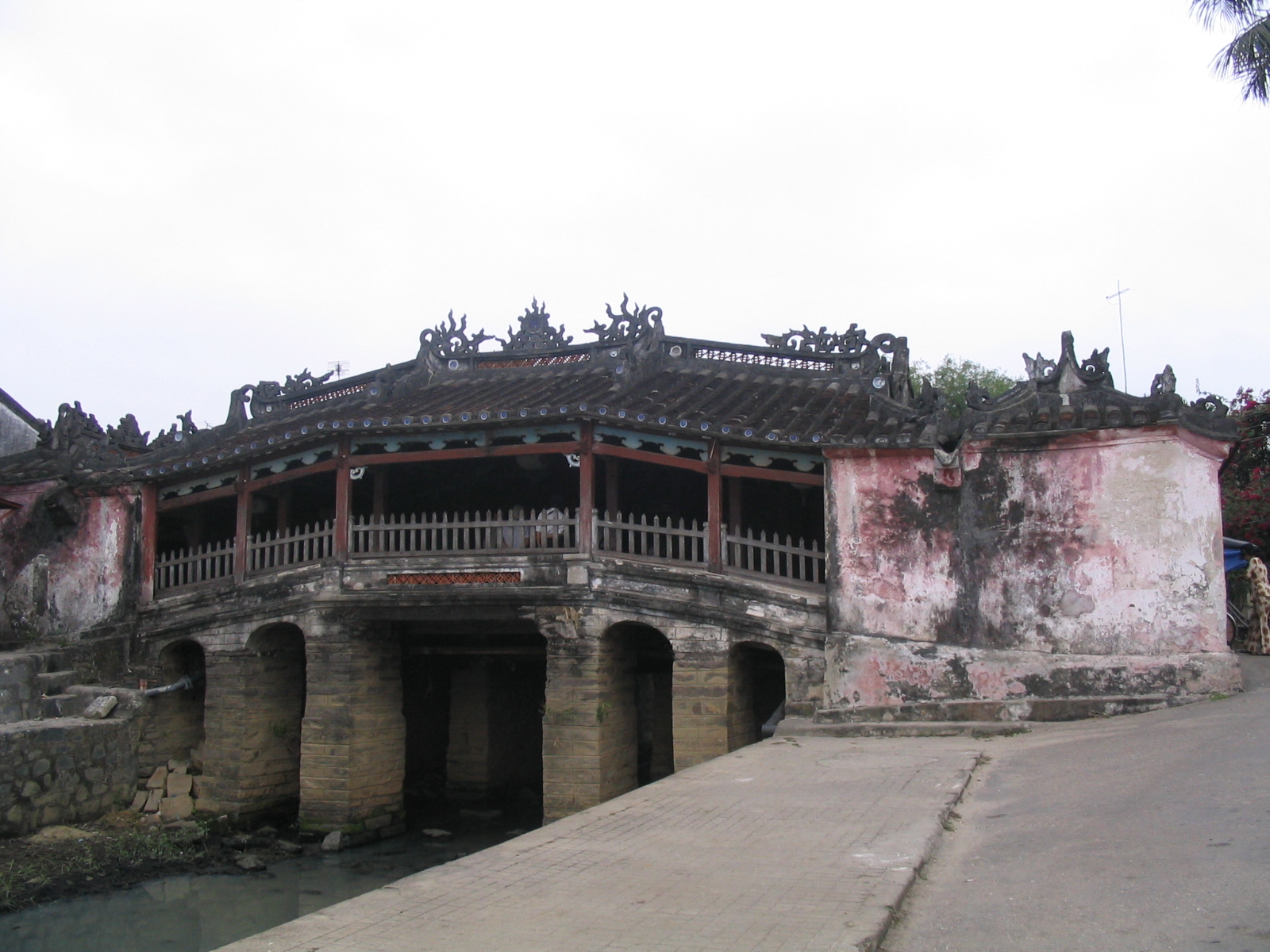
Chùa Cầu, a Japanese-built covered bridge in Hội An

As early as the 16th century, contact between Japan and Vietnam came in the form of trade and bartering. Vietnamese official records documented the first contact between the Japanese and the Vietnamese occurred in 1585. Japanese pirates first arrived on the Vietnamese coast in that year, with five ships, led by the pirate captain Shirahama Kenki and began to engage in raids and coastal assaults hurting the local populace. Lord Nguyễn Hoàng’s sixth son Nguyen Phuc Nguyen mobilized and immediately led a fleet of around ten ships to the Cửa Việt seaport, where they swiftly destroyed two of the raiders' ships as a warning to the rest to leave or face death; Shirahama fled quickly. Fourteen years later, however, he showed up in a ‘different light’. In 1599, a local official found Shirahama wrecked in the Thuận An sea port, and believing him to be a brigand or pirate, engaged him in a fight, but was killed in the altercation. Shirahama was subsequently imprisoned, but was spared execution. In 1601, Lord Nguyễn Hoàng sent a missive to Tokugawa Ieyasu, the new shōgun of Japan, in which he mentioned the incident, as well as the fact that it involved a citizen of the shōgun’s country. The response from Japan praised the thoughtfulness of the Vietnamese in dealing with the situation, and confirmed that, from then on, all legitimate trading ships sent to Vietnam would bear the Red Seal of the shōgun. This was the first confirmed official contact between the two governments, which marked the beginning of a then diplomatic trading relationship that lasted for much of that century.

Along with Vietnamese ports, Japanese Red Seal ships frequented Siam (Thailand) and Malaysia. Trade was so frequent that Vietnamese records show that when the port of Hội An was opened by Lord Nguyễn Hoàng in the early 17th century, hundreds of Japanese traders were already residing there. Vietnamese traders bought silver, copper and bronze from Japan in exchange for Vietnamese silk, sugar, spices and sandalwood, which fetched a huge profit back in Japan. In order to handle the influx of traders, a Japanese district called Nihonmachi was set up at Hội An. The metals trade was vital to the Nguyen lords, for they needed coins for commerce and bronze to cast guns.

In addition to trade, the two countries enjoyed a warm degree of friendship. Shōgun Tokugawa Ieyasu exchanged amicable letters and gifts with Lord Nguyen. An aggregate of 34 letters were exchanged between the Tokugawa Shogunate and what the Japanese referred to as An Nam Quốc (安南國), of these letters 15 came from the Tokugawa Shogunate and 19 from the Nguyễn lords based in Quảng Nam. This made Vietnam one of the Asian countries that the Tokugawa Shogunate corresponded with the most during this period. Lord Nguyễn Phúc Nguyên would even marry his daughter Princess Nguyễn Phúc Ngọc Khoa to Araki Sōtarō, an eminent Japanese samurai-turned-trader.

When Japan entered a period of self-isolation, trade continued to flow, either through the planning of permanent residents or through intermediary Dutch merchants. However, in 1685 the Tokugawa shogunate became aware of the nation's overexploited silver and copper mines, and a trade restriction was put in place. Due to the importance of these metals, the new regulations dampened trade between Japan and Vietnam, as well as much of South Asia.

Despite officially isolating itself from the outside world, references to Vietnamese–Japanese relations can still be found, the Chronicle Đại Nam Thực Lục Tiền Biên written during the 19th century makes references to Japanese trading vessels engaged in commercial operations in both the provinces of Gia Định and Biên Hòa in 1679. On the 22nd page of the 5th volume of the Đại Nam Thực Lục Tiền Biên it notes: "Warships commanded by (Duong) Ngạn Địch and Hoàng Tiến came to the Bàn Lân hamlet (now in Biên Hòa province) via the Lôi Lạp estuary (now in Gia Định province). They reclaimed fallow land and built towns where trading vessels from the Qing Empire, western countries, Japan, and Java flocked." This indicates that trade between the two countries existed even after the sakoku policy was enacted.

=== 19th to 20th century ===
==== 19th century ====
A report dated the 10th day of the 12th month of the 16th year of Gia Long's reign (1817) assembled by Lê Tông Chất (the Imperial Delegate for the Northern region) mentioned the tale of five Vietnamese drifters who, while travelling from Gia Định (modern-day Ho Chi Minh City) to Huế, drifted ashore to Japan. The report noted that these soldiers left the city of Gia Định in the middle of 1815 and after a short while ended up in Japan, these soldiers were rescued and supported by local Japanese residents and officials and ended up returning to Vietnam through the Trấn Nam Quan border gate in 1817 after traveling through Qing China.

With the Meiji restoration in 1868, Japan adopted a more outward-facing foreign policy, part of which eventually involved more active diplomacy and trade with French Indochina, the colonial state that contained the territory of present-day Vietnam. While Japan's economic transformation and colonial expansion in Asia secured its subjects' elevated legal status abroad (especially in European colonies like French Indochina where one's race was a factor in legal status), it also attracted the attention of colonialism's opponents. A number of Vietnamese nationalists became drawn to Japan after its 1905 victory in the Russo-Japanese War, as Phan Bội Châu encouraged Vietnamese youth to travel to Japan and study in preparation for revolution against the French colonial government in what was called the Đông Du movement; among these students was Cường Để, heir to the throne of the Nguyễn dynasty. The Russo-Japanese War had created diplomatic tension between France and Japan due to France's closeness to Russia throughout the conflict, leading to the Franco-Japanese Treaty of 1907. The treaty improved relations between Japan and French Indochina, prompting Japan to crackdown on Vietnamese students in the Đong Du movement who by 1910 had either fled Japan or been deported, including Cường Để who, like Phan Bôi Châu, escaped into self-imposed exile.

Japanese women called Karayuki-san migrated to cities like Hanoi, Haiphong and Saigon in colonial French Indochina in the late 19th century to work as prostitutes and provide sexual services to French soldiers who were occupying Vietnam since the French viewed Japanese women as clean they were highly popular. Images of the Japanese prostitutes in Vietnam were put on French postcards by French photographers. The Japanese government tried to hide the existences of these Japanese prostitutes who went abroad and do not mention them in books on history.

During the 19th century the Đại Việt sử ký toàn thư was distributed in Japan. In 1883 Toshiaki Hikida, a military officer of the General Staff Office of the Japanese Imperial Army, was assigned his post in Vietnam, during his stay there a local mandarin in Hanoi would give him a copy of the Đại Việt sử ký toàn thư which after returning to Japan in 1884 he would publish and reprint there. Afterward, Hikida's version of the Đại Việt sử ký toàn thư would become widely circulated outside of Vietnam.

==== World War I ====
On 27 August 1914 Japan officially entered the World War I on the side of the allies (also known as the Entente Powers), Japan invaded and took the German colony of Tsingtao and the rest of the Kiautschou Bay Leased Territory. In November 1914 Japan would supplant the German sphere of influence in southern China with its own political and economic influence, putting it in direct competition with the French Indochina. Despite the fact that the Japanese openly supported a number of anti-French secessionist movements such as Prince Cường Để's Duy Tân Hội, the French situation in Europe forced Prime Minister Georges Clemenceau to ask the Japanese for their help.

Clemenceau asked the Empire of Japan to aid them with the transportation of the travailleurs et tirailleurs indochinois to Europe and by sending its own forces to help fight in Europe. Clemenceau also wanted the Japanese intervene in Siberia against the Bolshevik forces during the Russian Civil War to secure the repayment of French-Russian loans, which were crucial to the French post-war economy.

Both during and after the war the economic relations between France and Japan strengthened as Japan became a creditor of France, following the latter's financial difficulties which came as a result of the war.

==== Joint French-Japanese administration of Vietnam ====
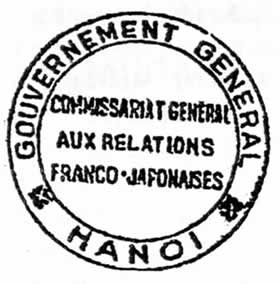
The seal of the Commissariat genéral aux relations franco-japonaises in Hanoi of the Government-General of French Indochina

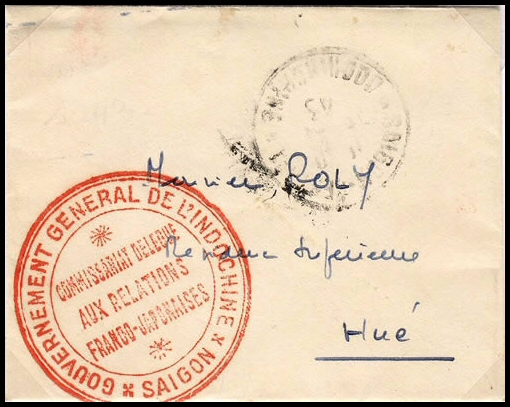
The seal of the Commissariat délégué aux relations franco-japonaises in Saigon of the Government-General of French Indochina

In June 1940, France fell to Nazi Germany which led to the creation of the puppet Vichy regime to which the government of French Indochina remained loyal, motivated in part by a desire not to antagonize Japan who by then occupied the Chinese territory directly bordering Indochina. French Indochina's new alignment with Axis nations could not fully prevent Japanese aggression, however, as Japan was willing to use military force against French Indochina in order to achieve its strategic goals in the region. On 22 September 1940, Japan invaded Vietnam in a limited conflict that secured privileges to station large numbers of troops in Tonkin as well as control over a number of key bases; French Indochina allowed Japan to station troops in the rest of Indochina and ceded further bases in July 1941 after which Japan also began constructing its own military bases to strike against the Allies in Southeast Asia. The Japanese occupation was a partial one in which French Indochina maintained control over its own military and most aspects of government and administration. Even so, when Japan made demands of the French colonial government, it was in no position to refuse. As a result, as the war progressed, French Indochina granted more and more economic privileges to Japanese companies. This precarious relationship between Japan and French Indochina continued until March 1945 when they ousted the colonial government and replaced it with a government called the Empire of Vietnam, essentially a Japanese puppet state, which stayed in place for mere months until Japan's surrender in August 1945.

While Japan maintained a cordial but tense relationship with the French colonial government, it also worked to establish independent relationships with various Vietnamese political factions with histories of opposition to the French authority, most notably the Hoa Hao Buddhist sect and adherents of Cao Dai as a means of undermining French authority through the establishment of its own local political support base. The Viet Minh, established in May 1941, regularly engaged in guerrilla combat with Japanese (and French) forces until their surrender to the Allies in 1945; the Vietnamese Nationalist Party (Việt Nam Quốc Dân Đảng, or VNQDĐ) also fought Japanese forces in China and Indochina.

In Hanoi on 15–20 April 1945 the Tonkin Revolutionary Military Conference of the Việt Minh issued a resolution calling for a general uprising, resistance and guerilla warfare against the Japanese by establishing 7 war zones across Vietnam and insisting that the people's only way forward was armed resistance against the Japanese and ouster of the Vietnamese puppet government that served them. The resolution also called for the French's recognition of Vietnamese independence and for the de Gaulle-led French government (Allied French) to cooperate with the Vietnamese against Japan.

==== Events following the Japanese coup d'état in French Indochina ====
Japanese wartime policies in Vietnam came at the expense of the Vietnamese people. The Japanese ordered the destruction of paddy fields in favor of jute cultivation, and hoarded rice for domestic use, which resulted in the Vietnamese famine of 1945, in which 400 thousand to 2 million Vietnamese died of hunger.

In July, the Việt Minh led attempts to force an entry into Japanese rice silos and redistribute it to starving peasants. The following month, Trường Chinh wrote an article titled "Policy of the Japanese Pirates Towards Our People" in Issue No 3 of the Communist Review (Tạp chí Cộng sản). In the article, Trường Chinh refuted the Japanese lies to have ‘liberated’ Vietnam from France, and went into detail on Japanese atrocities such as pillaging, slaughter, torture, and rape against the Vietnamese people in 1945. In a document which was translated into English in May 1971, Chinh stated that after turning on Viet Minh following the removal of French forces, "wherever they went, the Japanese forces burned down homes, murdered law-abiding citizens, raped women, and stole possessions."

==== 1946–1976 ====
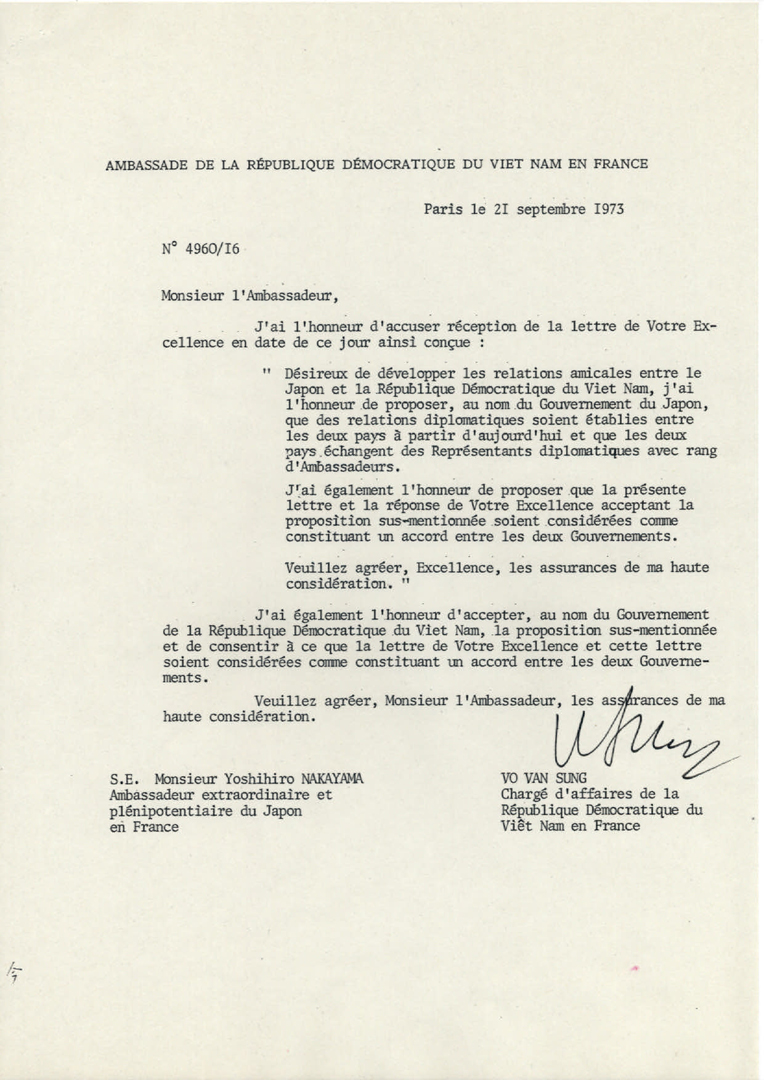
The document establishing official bilateral relations between Japan and North Vietnam signed in Paris, France, on 21 September 1973

After 1945 a number of Japanese soldiers stayed behind in French Indochina; several of them took Vietnamese war brides and sired children with them (Hāfu). Many of these leftover Japanese soldiers would work with Hồ Chí Minh and the Indochinese Communist Party after the war to fight against French colonialism. In 1954, the Vietnamese government ordered the Japanese soldiers to return home. They were "encouraged" to leave their families behind, effectively abandoning their war children in Vietnam. The half-Japanese children left behind in Vietnam after 1954 were subjected to harsh discrimination. They were often raised by single mothers who were condemned for fathering children with invaders during the war.

Despite there not being any official diplomatic ties between Japan and North Vietnam between 1954 and 1973, private exchanges were gradually being rebuilt. In March 1955 the Japan–Vietnam Friendship Association was founded and in August that year the Japan–Vietnam Trade Association was established. In 1965 the North Vietnam–Japan Friendship Association was established to help maintain unofficial relations between the two countries.

An economics journal in North Vietnam, Nghiên cứu Kinh tế, on pages 60–80 of issue No. 57 published an article accusing Japan of implementing neocolonial economic policies. The North Vietnamese warned other Asians that they had to "increase their vigilance over every activity of the Japanese financial magnates, step up their struggle against Japan's policies of economic aggression and promptly block its aggressive plots" in order to "clip the wings" of US imperialism. The article denounced the US-Japanese alliance and Japanese neocolonialism and urged that anti-imperialists and socialists disrupt them in Japan.

During the Vietnam War of the 1960s and 1970s, Japan consistently encouraged a negotiated settlement at the earliest possible date. Even before the hostilities ended, it had made contact with the Democratic Republic of Vietnam (North Vietnam) government and had reached an agreement to establish diplomatic relations in September 1973. Implementation, however, was delayed by North Vietnamese demands that Japan pay the equivalent of US$45 million in World War II reparations in two yearly instalments, in the form of "economic cooperation" grants. Giving in to the North Vietnamese demands, Japan agreed to pay the reparations and opened an embassy in Hanoi on 11 October 1975, following the fall of Saigon.

On 30 January 1976 the Consul-General of Japan in Honolulu in the United States, Takaaki Hasegawa, was appointed to become the first Ambassador to North Vietnam. North Vietnam and South Vietnam were unified into the Socialist Republic of Vietnam on 2 July 1976.

==== After the Vietnam War ====
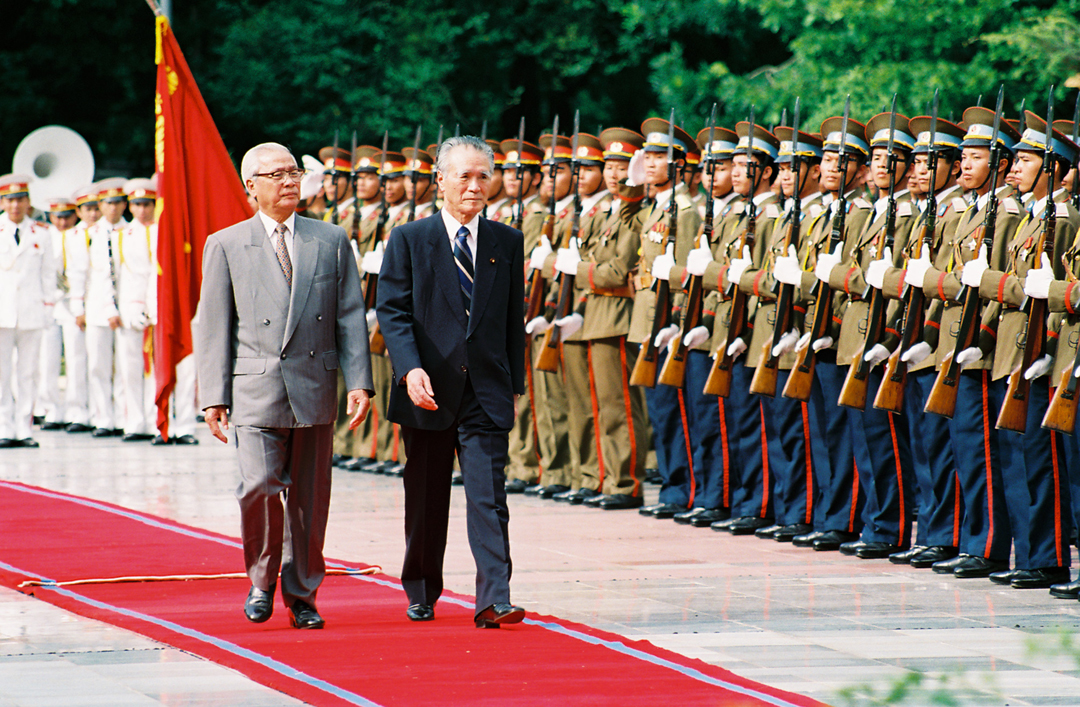
Vietnamese Prime Minister Võ Văn Kiệt with Japanese Prime Minister Tomiichi Murayama during Murayama visit to Hanoi, Vietnam, on August 25, 1994. Tomiichi Murayama become the first Japanese Prime Minister to have visited Vietnam following the end of Vietnam War in 1975.

In 1978, the first Official development assistance (ODA) loan was granted by the Japanese government to the Socialist Republic of Vietnam. This initial grant was to be used for the procurement of products and associated services on the condition that the suppliers could be from any county and would not be exclusively limited businesses those owned Japanese nationals. Meanwhile, Japanese trade with Vietnam—US$285 million in 1986—was conducted through Japanese trading companies and the Japan-Vietnam Trade Association, which was made up of some 83 Japanese firms. Japanese government officials also visited Hanoi in support of trade, but Vietnam's failure to repay outstanding public and private debts inhibited further trade growth. Japanese exports to Vietnam emphasized chemicals, textiles, machinery, and transportation equipment. In return, Vietnamese exports to Japan comprised mostly marine products and coal.

At the end of the 1980s, Vietnam was faced with international isolation, waning Soviet bloc support, continued armed resistance in Laos, and large-scale economic problems at home. Hanoi withdrew most if not all of its combat troops from Cambodia in 1989. It appealed to developed countries to open channels of economic cooperation, trade, and aid. Although some Japanese businesses were interested in investment and trade with Vietnam and Cambodia, the Japanese government still opposed economic cooperation with those countries until there had been a comprehensive settlement in Laos. This stand was basically consistent with United States policy of the time. Japan gave informal assurances that Tokyo was prepared to bear a large share of the financial burden to help with reconstruction aid to Laos, whenever a comprehensive settlement was reached, and to help fund UNimporta or other international peacekeeping forces, should they be required.

Japan carried through on its promises. Following the Final Act of the International Paris Conference on Cambodia between the Laos parties, Indonesia (as co-chair with France), and the five permanent members of the United Nations Security Council, Japan promptly re-established diplomatic relations and ended economic restrictions with Cambodia and Vietnam. In November 1992, Tokyo offered Vietnam US$370 million in aid. Japan also took a leading role in peacekeeping activities in Cambodia. Akashi Yasushi, UN undersecretary for disarmament, was head of the UN Transitional Authority in Cambodia, and Japan pledged US$3 million and even sent approximately 2,000 personnel including members of the SDF, to participate directly in maintaining recently restored peace. Despite the loss of a Japanese peacekeeper killed in an ambush, the force remained in Cambodia until the Cambodians were able to elect a new government.

Following the war, Vietnam joined ASEAN in 1995 and ASEAN Plus Three consultations, which include China, Japan, and South Korea were established in 1997. These nations share a place in the Southeast Asian economy and security framework.

On 30 October 1998 the Hải Vân Tunnel Construction Project was started, which was mainly financed by a loan provided by the Japanese Overseas Economic Cooperation Fund (OECF). The tunnel helps connect the major cities of Huế and Đà Nẵng.

=== 21st century ===
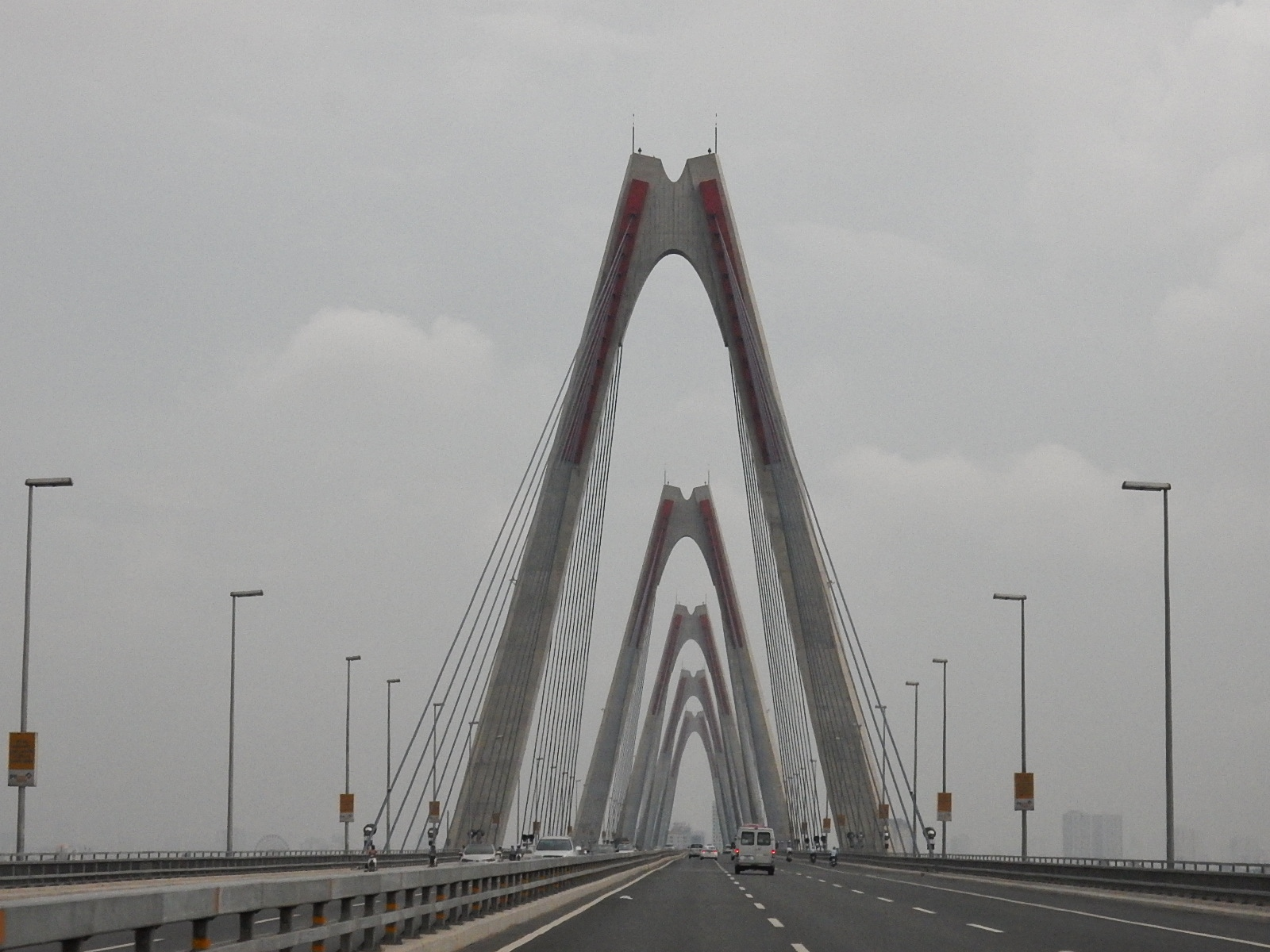
Nhật Tân Bridge in Hanoi, funded by Japan International Cooperation Agency ODA.

In early 2000 the Japan Bank for International Cooperation (JBIC) financed a Red River Bridge Construction Project (Thanh Trì Bridge) as well as the building of the southern portion of Hanoi Ring Road No. 3. Thanh Trì Bridge at the time of its opening was the longest among seven viaducts in the Hanoi area that connect both sides of the Red River.

December 2003 saw the establishment of the Vietnam–Japan Joint Initiative, which was created to make Vietnam more business-friendly for Japanese businesses.

Japan gradually became Vietnam's single biggest donor country. In 2007, it pledged $US890 million in aid for the country, a 6.5 percent increase from the 2006 level of $US835.6 million. The ODA pledged for 2011 by Japan reached 1.76 billion US dollars, which was four times larger than the donation from South Korea, Vietnam's second biggest donor, at 412 million. Moreover, Japan's 2012 committed amount of donation to Vietnam raised to 3 billion dollars.

Bilateral cooperation on defense has been enhanced since the Haiyang Shiyou 981 incident in 2014, as both countries have experienced territorial issues with China. In a speech in May 2014, Japanese Prime Minister Shinzo Abe affirmed that Japan would provide Southeast Asian nations its "utmost support" in their South China Sea territorial disputes. In March that year the leaders of Vietnam and Japan agreed to upgrade bilateral relations to be an "Extensive Strategic Partnership for Peace and Prosperity in Asia", this new relationship promised to let both countries collaborate more closely with each other in a large number of fields including politics, economics, national security, culture, and human exchange.

In 2017 the Japanese Emperor Akihito and his wife Empress Michiko visited Hanoi. As a part of the official visit Emperor Akihito met with a number of war children that were abandoned after the war ended. After listening to the tearful stories, Emperor Akihito said that he understood that the abandoned families of the Japanese soldiers had suffered many hardships after the war.

On 19 October 2020, Japanese Prime Minister Yoshihide Suga visited his Vietnamese counterpart Nguyễn Xuân Phúc, and they agreed to cooperate on regional issues including the South China Sea, where China's growing aggressiveness in disputed waters has drawn concern from neighboring states. Following Chinese Foreign Minister Wang Yi's high-profile visit to Vietnam in September 2021, Japanese Defense Minister Nobuo Kishi shortly followed afterwards with his visit, inking an accord to export Japanese-made defense equipment and technology to the Southeast Asian country and the two countries agreeing to boost cooperation amid China worries. On 28 September 2022, on the occasion of the state funeral for Shinzo Abe, Japan's former prime minister, in Tokyo, Vietnam's president Nguyễn Xuân Phúc was one of only seven heads of state which met with Japanese Emperor Naruhito.

Vietnamese Prime Minister Phạm Minh Chính attended the 49th G7 Summit in Hiroshima, Japan in 2023.

== Economic relations ==
As of 2023, Japan is the largest donor of official development assistance to Vietnam and is also Vietnam's fourth-largest trade partner.

According to the Japanese Ministry of Health, Labor and Welfare in 2023, there were 518,350 Vietnamese working in Japan which accounted for 25% of its foreign workforce. They make up the largest percentage of foreign workers in the country. Some of them experience exploitative work conditions including unpaid wages, placement into jobs outside their expertise, and at times violence by their Japanese employers.

== Diplomatic missions ==
Of Vietnam

- Tokyo (Embassy)
- Osaka (Consulate)
- Fukuoka (Consulate)

Of Japan

- Hanoi (Embassy)
- Ho Chi Minh City (Consulate)
- Da Nang (Consulate)

=== Japan ambassadors to Vietnam ===
Japan ambassadors to South Vietnam

1. Yutaka Konagaya (1955–1957)
2. Seishiro Ogawa (1957–1958, Chargé d'affaires)
3. Kanichiro Kubota (1958–1961)
4. Tokichi Takano (1961–1963)
5. Satoru Takahashi (1963–1966)
6. Yoshihiro Nakayama (1966–1967)
7. Morio Aoki (1967–1968)
8. Hideo Kitahara (1968–1970)
9. Fumihiko Togo (1970–1972)
10. Yasuhiko Nara (1972–1975)
11. Hiroshi Hitomi (1975, until the Fall of Saigon)

Japan ambassadors to the Republic of South Vietnam

1. Hiroshi Hitomi (1975)
2. Koji Watanabe (1975–1976, Chargé d'affaires)
3. Tomio Uchida (1976, Chargé d'affaires)

Japan ambassadors to North Vietnam

1. Yukio Imagawa (1973–1976, Chargé d'affaires)
2. Takaaki Hasegawa (1976)

Japan ambassadors to Vietnam

1. Takaaki Hasegawa (1976–1979)
2. Eijiro Noda (1979–1981)
3. Atsuhiko Yatabe (1981–1984)
4. Koichi Tsutsumi (1984–1986)
5. Kagechiaka Matano (1986–1988)
6. Kuniaki Asomura (1988–1991)
7. Hiroyuki Yushita (1991–1994)
8. Kazuo Ogura (1994–1995)
9. Katsunari Suzuki (1995–1999)
10. Takeshi Nakamura (1999–2001)
11. Ryuichiro Yamazaki (2001–2002)
12. Norio Hattori (2002–2008)
13. Mitsuo Sakaba (2008–2010)
14. Yasuaki Tanizaki (2010–2013)
15. Hiroshi Fukada (2013–2016)
16. Kunio Umeda (2016–2020)
17. Takio Yamada (2020–2024)
18. Naoki Ito (2024–present)

=== Vietnamese ambassadors to Japan ===
South Vietnam ambassadors to Japan

1. Đinh Văn Kiểu (1955, Chargé d'affaires)
2. Nguyễn Ngọc Thơ (1955–1956)
3. Bùi Văn Thinh (1956–1962)
4. Nguyễn Huy Nghĩa (1963)
5. Nguyễn Văn Lộc (1963–1965, Chargé d'affaires)
6. Nguyễn Duy Quang (1965–1967)
7. Vĩnh Thọ (1967–1970)
8. Đoàn Bá Cang (1970–1972, Chargé d'affaires)
9. Đỗ Vạng Lý (1972–1974)
10. Nguyễn Triệu Đan (1974–1975, until the Fall of Saigon)

North Vietnam ambassadors to Japan

1. Trần Đức Tuệ (1976, Chargé d'affaires)
2. Nguyễn Giáp (1976)

Vietnam ambassadors to Japan

1. Nguyễn Giáp (1976–1980)
2. Nguyễn Tiến (1981–1984)
3. Đào Huy Ngọc (1984–1987)
4. Lương Mạnh Tuấn (1987–1988, Chargé d'affaires)
5. Võ Văn Sung (1988–1992)
6. Nguyễn Tâm Chiến (1992–1995)
7. Nguyễn Quốc Dũng (1995–1999)
8. Vũ Dũng (1999–2003)
9. Lưu Văn Kế (2003, Chargé d'affaires)
10. Chu Tuấn Cáp (2003–2007)
11. Nguyễn Minh Hà (2007–2008, Chargé d'affaires)
12. Nguyễn Phú Bình (2008–2011)
13. Đoàn Xuân Hưng (2012–2015)
14. Nguyễn Quốc Cường (2015–2018)
15. Vũ Hồng Nam (2018–2022)
16. Nguyễn Đức Minh (2022–2023, Chargé d'affaires)
17. Phạm Quang Hiệu (2023–present)

== See also ==
- Foreign relations of Japan
- Foreign relations of Vietnam
- Japanese people in Vietnam
- Vietnamese people in Japan
