= Kantō Plain =

Plain in the Kantō region, Japan

Coordinates: 36°00′N 140°00′E

Geofeatures map of Kantō

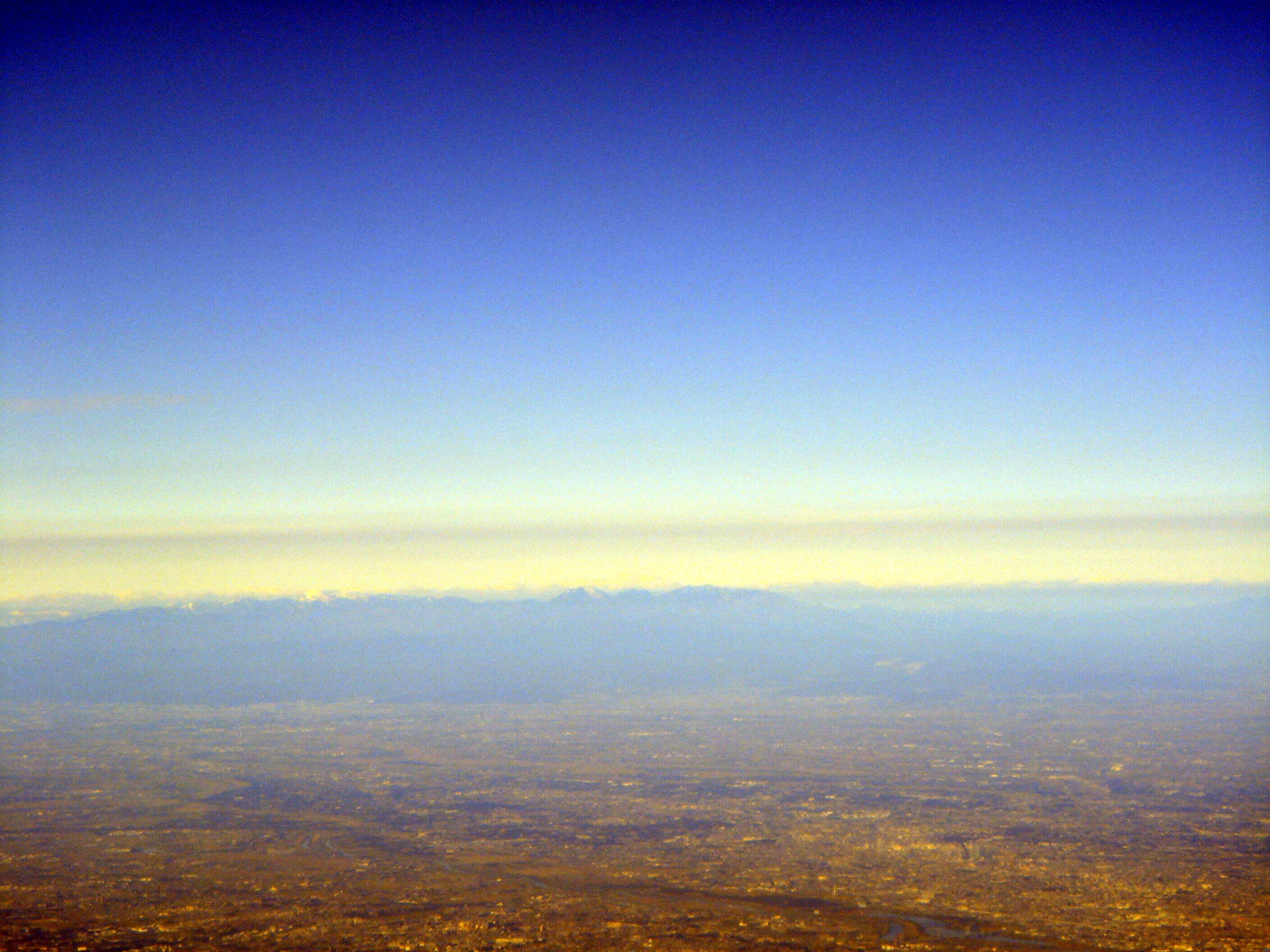
Aerial view of Kantō Plain

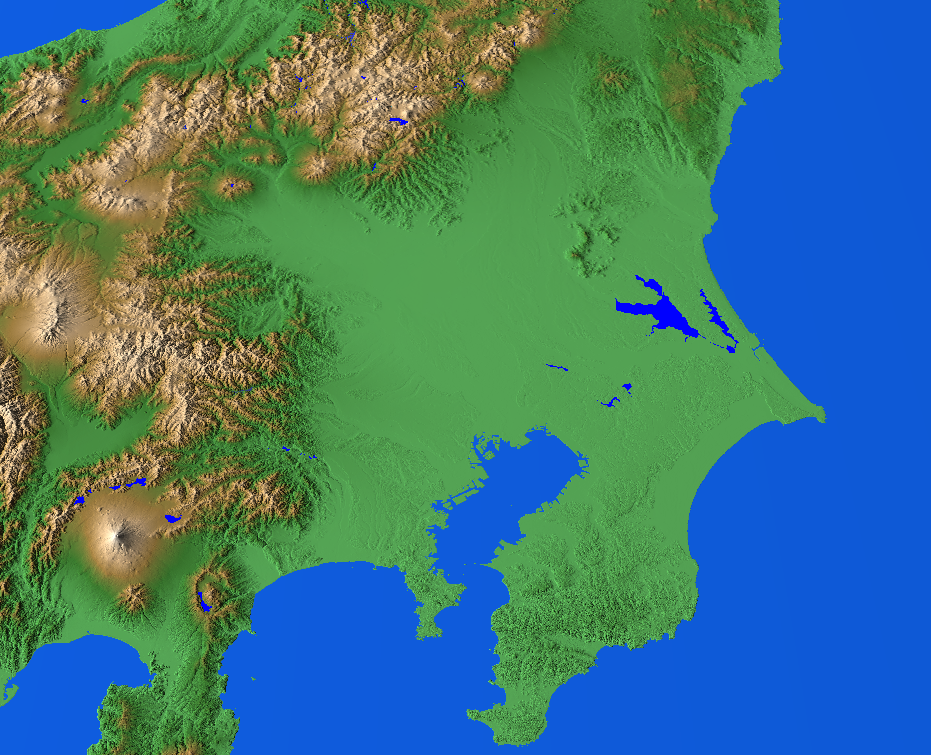
Map of the Kantō Plain. Tokyo Bay is at bottom center.

The Kantō Plain (Japanese: 関東平野, Hepburn: Kantō heiya), in the Kantō region of central Honshu, is the largest plain in Japan. Its 17,000 km^{2} covers more than half of the region extending over Tokyo, Saitama Prefecture, Kanagawa Prefecture, Chiba Prefecture, Gunma Prefecture, Tochigi Prefecture, and Ibaraki Prefecture.

== Geography ==
The northern limit borders on the Abukuma Highlands, Yamizo Mountain Range, Ashio Mountain Range, and a volcanic field associated with the Nasu Volcanic Belt. The western coincides with the Kantō Mountain Range, and the southern edge is defined by the Bōsō Peninsula, the Miura Hills, Tokyo Bay, and Sagami Bay. The Kashima Sea and Kujūkuri Beach define the eastern end of the plain. Most of its rivers originate in the northern or western mountain ranges and flow east or southeast into the Pacific Ocean, Tokyo Bay, or Sagami Bay. In the central part of the plain is the Tone River; in the northern part the Watarase River, Kinu River, Kokai River, Naka River, and Kuji River; and in the southern part the Arakawa River, Tama River, and Sagami River. Of these, the Tone River encompasses a large area of floodplain, for its drainage area of 16,840 km^{2} (6,500 sq mi) is the largest in Japan. The drainage areas covered by these rivers account for the alluvial lowland of the Kantō Plain.

A collection of plateaus constitute a large part of the plain. Among them are the Ōmiya, Musashino, Sagamino, Jōsō, and Shimōsa Plateaus. These large plateaus are divided into smaller ones by shallow river valleys. A common feature of the plateaus is that their surfaces are covered with a thick layer of loam of volcanic origin. Volcanic ash from surrounding volcanoes, Mounts Asama, Haruna, and Akagi to the north and Mounts Hakone and Fuji to the southwest, are thought to have been deposited on these plateaus.

Among the plateaus, the Musashino Plateau has the largest stretch of land, extending from the western edge of Ōme to the eastern edge of Yamanote, which borders the alluvial plains of the Arakawa and Sumida Rivers. Its elevation gradually declines from west to east, measuring 190 m at Ōme and 20 m at Yamanote.

Hills in the Kantō Plain stand on Tertiary strata and rise higher than surrounding plateaus, exemplified by the Sayama Hills and Tama Hills, typically, undulating between 100 and 200 m above sea level. Hills located at the western edge of the Kantō Plain, the Hiki Hills, Koma Hills, Kusahana Hills, and Kaji Hills, also reach approximately 200 m (660 ft) above sea level.

The overall tilt of the plateaus and hills is noteworthy. In general, the whole area is slightly bent and forming a basin centered in the Tone River and Tokyo Bay. The ongoing process of tectonic extension continues as the plain's central region gradually sinks.

The Kantō Plain witnessed its greatest devastation from an earthquake on 1 September 1923, with a death toll calculated of 142,807.

== Geology ==
Kanto Plain was formed by the Kanto basin-forming movement, which has continued since the Neogene period. This movement is what caused sedimentation in the center of the present-day Kanto Plain and uplift of the surrounding mountains. As a result, sediment from the surrounding mountains was deposited very thickly (the Tertiary layer reaches as high as 3,000 meters) and further uplifted to form many hills and plateaus. Large tectonic lines such as the eastern margin of the Fossa Magna and the Median Tectonic Line are thought to exist in the central part of the plain, but this thick accumulation of soft sedimentary layers makes it difficult to find active faults that can cause earthquakes (faults exist in the base 3000m below the sedimentary layers). In addition, natural sediments such as sediment carried by rivers have been used to create land, and the terrain was almost the same as it is today in the Late Jomon to Early Yayoi Period (more than 3,000 years ago).

== Climate ==
The climate of the Kanto Plain is temperate, with a Pacific Ocean side climate. Winters are cold and summers are hot. The further inland, the greater the temperature difference between summer and winter, and within a day. There are relatively many hours of sunshine, especially in the northern part. Due to the influence of the Black Current (warm current) flowing along the coast, the climate is mild, especially in the southern part.

In summer, rainfall is heavy due to the rainy season front caused by monsoon, and typhoons are often seen. Thunderclouds that form in the northern to western mountains areas before noon reach the plains in the early afternoon, often resulting in evening showers (thunderstorms). In years when Okhotsk anticyclone prevails, the winds from this anticyclone become northeasterly winds, and temperatures do not rise due to the cool air brought in by the Yamase, resulting in a cold summer.

In winter, the monsoon from the Sea of Japan is blocked by the Mikuni Mountains, and the moisture falls as snow along the mountains to the north, and the monsoon that has lost its moisture blows through the Kanto Plain as a strong gale carrying dry air (such as Akagi Orosi in Gunma Prefecture, Tsukuba Orosi in Ibaraki Prefecuture and Futaara Orosi). Snowfall has been decreasing year by year, but snow accumulation of around 10–20 cm is recorded several times during the winter.

Throughout the year, the entire Kanto Plain, especially the inland areas, are easily affected by radiative cooling due to clear skies and north winds, so the minimum temperature before sunrise can drop to about 5 degrees below zero in winter. Even on days when the temperature drops at dawn, the daytime temperature rises to about 7 to 10 degrees Celsius on sunny days, and on days with strong dry north winds, the sensory temperature is lower than the actual temperature. The lowest temperatures in central Tokyo are higher than those in surrounding areas due to the heat island effect. Kumagaya tends to get hotter because of being inland, because of the Foehn phenomenon (which occurs when the wind in the sky above blows down after crossing the mountains on the north and west sides of the Kanto Plain), and because of the sea breeze that warms up while passing through central Tokyo.
