= Hayato Great Falls =

- 早戸大滝
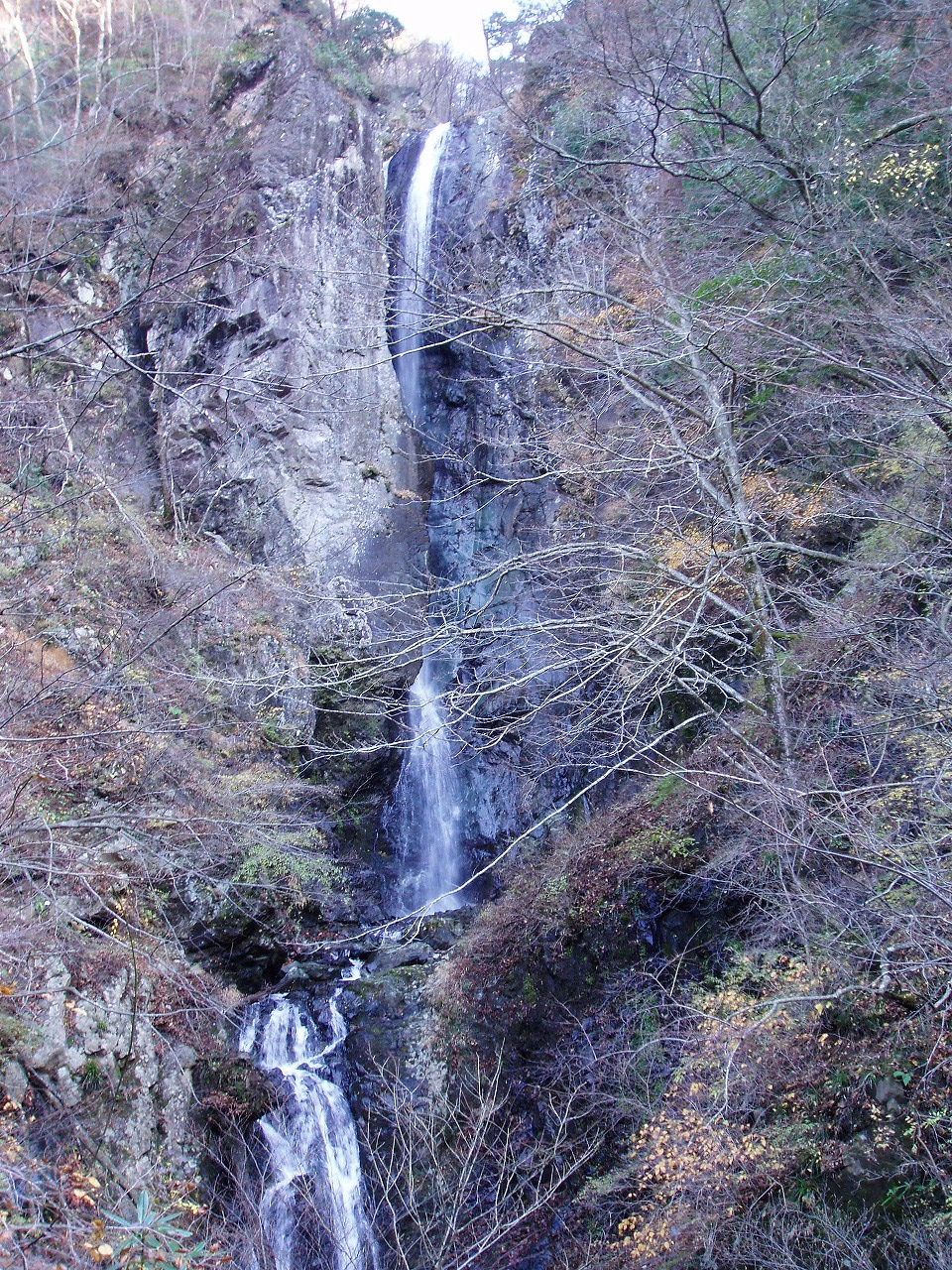

- Location within Japan
- Location: Sagamihara, Kanagawa Prefecture, Japan
- Coordinates: 35°29′16″N 139°09′39″E
- Type: multiple fan
- Total height: 50 m (160 ft)
- Number of drops: 2
- Longest drop: 40 m (130 ft)
- Watercourse: Hayato River

Hayato Great Falls (早戸大滝, Hayato-Ōtaki) is a waterfall on the Hayato River within the boundaries of the Tanzawa-Ōyama Quasi-National Park, in Sagamihara, Kanagawa Prefecture, Japan.

The Hayato Great Falls has a large volume of water, and drops in two separate plunges with a total height of 50 metres (160 ft). The upper falls has a height of 40 metres (130 ft), and the lower has a height of 10 metres (33 ft). The view is blocked by a great rock protruding from the middle of the upper fall, so that the whole waterfall can be seen clearly only from the bottom. The Hayato Great Falls is located deep within Tanzawa Mountains, and is accessible only by a two-hour hike on poorly marked and maintained mountain trails from the nearest road. Parts of the trail have things like beams you have to cross and a very poorly built wooden bridge. There are also many leeches, gnats and other pests on this trail during certain seasons. It is highly advisable to wear hiking shoes and long sleeve pants as leeches most commonly go for you lower legs. It is inaccessible during inclement weather, and thus has few visitors.

The Hayato Great Falls is listed as one of "Japan’s Top 100 Waterfalls", in a listing published by the Japanese Ministry of the Environment in 1990.
