= Mount Ōmuro (Tanzawa) =

Mountain in the Tanzawa Mountains, Japan

- 大室山
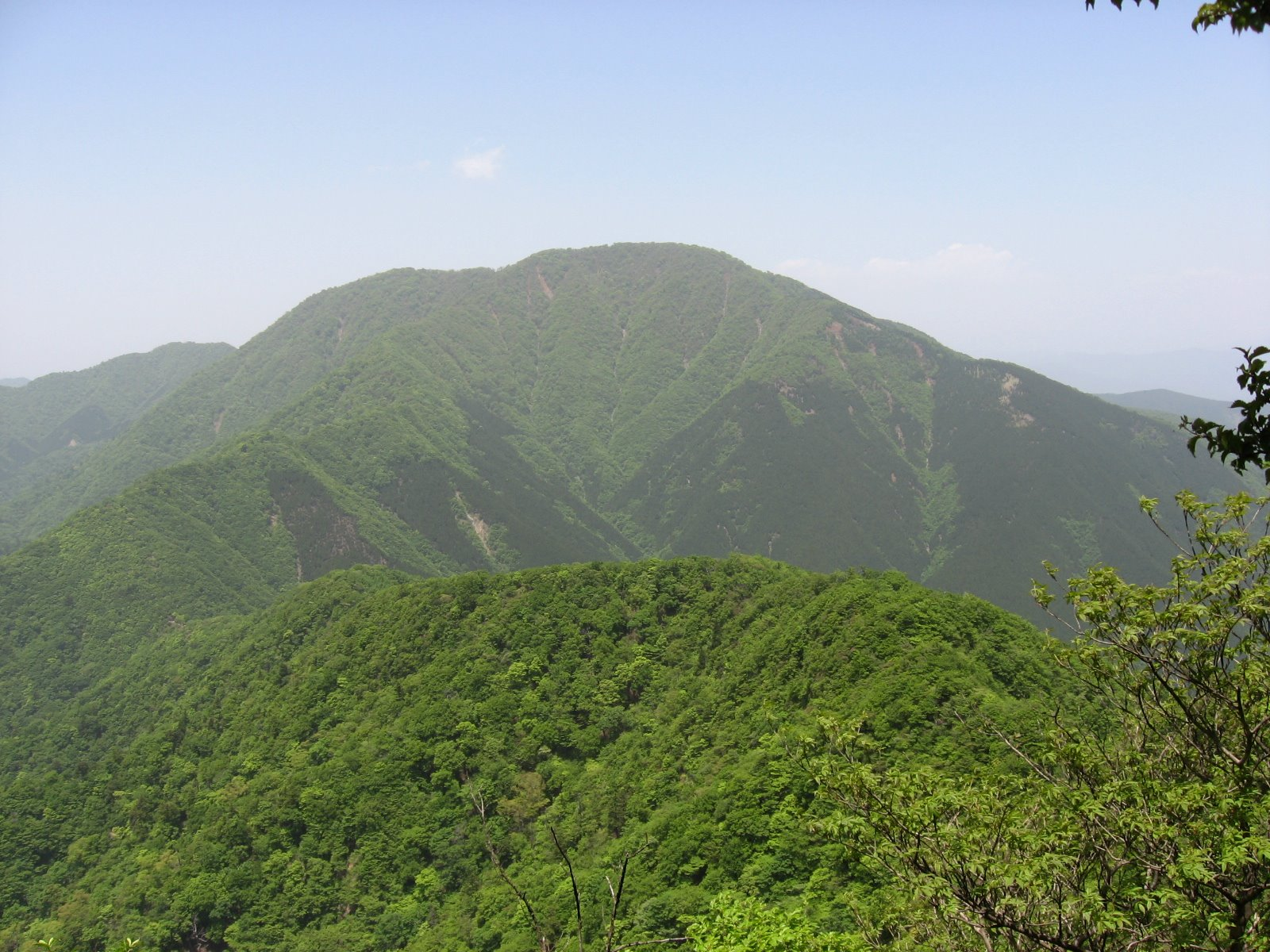
- Mount Ōmuro as seen from Mount Okoge

Highest point
- Elevation: 1,588 m (5,210 ft)
- Coordinates: 35°30′40″N 139°04′06″E

Geography
- Location: Sagamihara, Kanagawa Prefecture; Dōshi, Yamanashi Prefecture

Mount Ōmuro (大室山, Ōmuroyama) is a mountain at an altitude of 1,588 m on the border between Yamanashi and Kanagawa Prefectures in the northern part of the Tanzawa Mountains. It used to be called "Omureyama". It is counted as one of the 100 famous mountains in Yamanashi, and the Kanagawa side is designated as Tanzawa-Ōyama National Monument.
