= Tama Kyūryō Prefectural Natural Park =

Prefectural natural park of Tokyo, Japan

Coordinates: 35°39′36.1″N 139°24′35.1″E

- 都立多摩丘陵自然公園
- Interactive map of Tama Kyūryō Prefectural Natural Park
- Location: Tokyo, Japan
- Area: 19.59 km^{2} (7.56 sq mi)
- Established: 25 November 1950

Tama Kyūryō Prefectural Natural Park (都立多摩丘陵自然公園, Toritsu Tama Kyūryō shizen kōen) is a Prefectural Natural Park in Western Tokyo, Japan. Established in 1950, the park takes its names from the Tama Hills, celebrated in the Man'yōshū. There are views towards the Chichibu Tama Kai National Park.

== See also ==
- National Parks of Japan
- Parks and gardens in Tokyo
