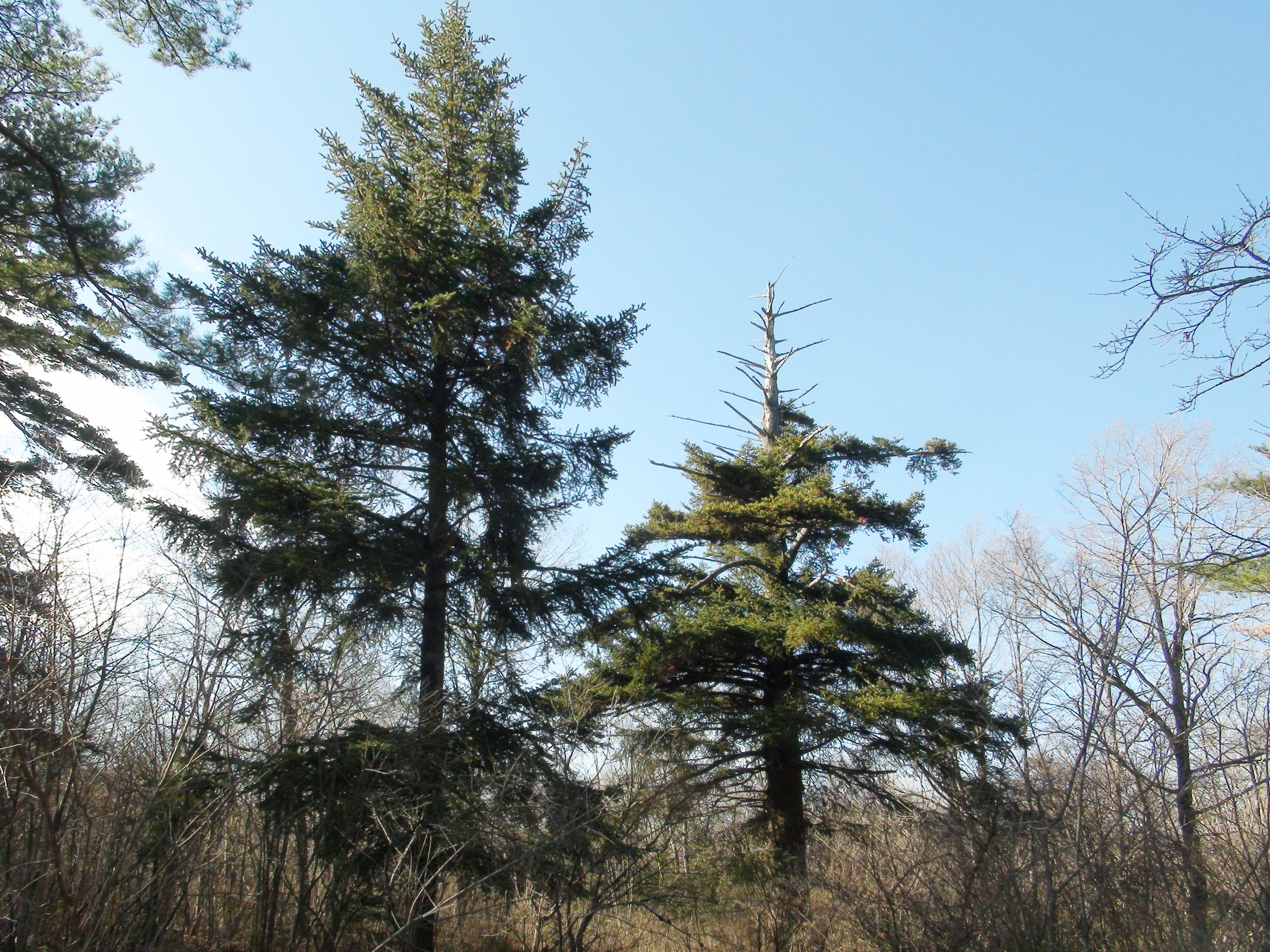
- At Yamanakako, Japan

Conservation status
- Vulnerable (IUCN 3.1)

Scientific classification
- Kingdom: Plantae
- Clade: Tracheophytes
- Clade: Gymnospermae
- Division: Pinophyta
- Class: Pinopsida
- Order: Pinales
- Family: Pinaceae
- Genus: Picea
- Species: P. polita

Binomial name
- Picea polita (Siebold & Zucc.) Carrière

Synonyms
- Abies polita Siebold & Zucc.; Abies torano Siebold ex K.Koch; Picea torano Koehne; Pinus abies Thunb.; Pinus polita (Siebold & Zucc.) Antoine; Pinus torano Voss

= Picea polita =

Species of conifer

Picea polita (syn: Picea torano), the tigertail spruce or harimomi (Japanese:ハリモミ), is a species of coniferous tree in the family Pinaceae. It is native to Japan, occurring on the Pacific Ocean side of central Honshu, as well as Shikoku and Kyushu.

== Description ==
The harimoni typically reaches 30 m, developing a trunk diameter of around 1 m. The crown stays broadly pyramidal in young trees, becoming rounded, domed, or flat-topped with age. The primary branches are long, slender, and mostly horizontal, the secondary branches are shorter, numerous, and spreading to ascending. Vegetative buds are oblong, slightly resinous, with smooth, chestnut-brown scales that persist for several years.

Leaves are arranged radially around the shoots, extremely stiff and sharply pointed, quadrangular in cross-section, deep green, usually 15–20 mm long, with several stomatal lines on each face. The unusually rigid and pungent needles are a defining character of the species.

== Distribution ==
On Honshu the species is distributed on the Pacific Ocean side of central Honshu, extending westward from Fukushima Prefecture, south through the Japanese Alps and the Kii Peninsula, and is absent from the part of Honshu west of Kyoto. Additional populations occur on Shikoku and Kyushu.

It grows in mountainous regions, including the Kanto Mountains and Chubu Mountains, typically around 1,000 m above sea level. The range extends from approximately 600 to 1,700 m, with records from as low as about 400 m and up to nearly 1,850 m, primarily on volcanic soils.

== Ecology ==
The tree is considered the most warm-adapted species within the genus Picea.
