= Okuyugawara Prefectural Natural Park =

Prefectural natural in Japan

- 県立奥湯河原自然公園
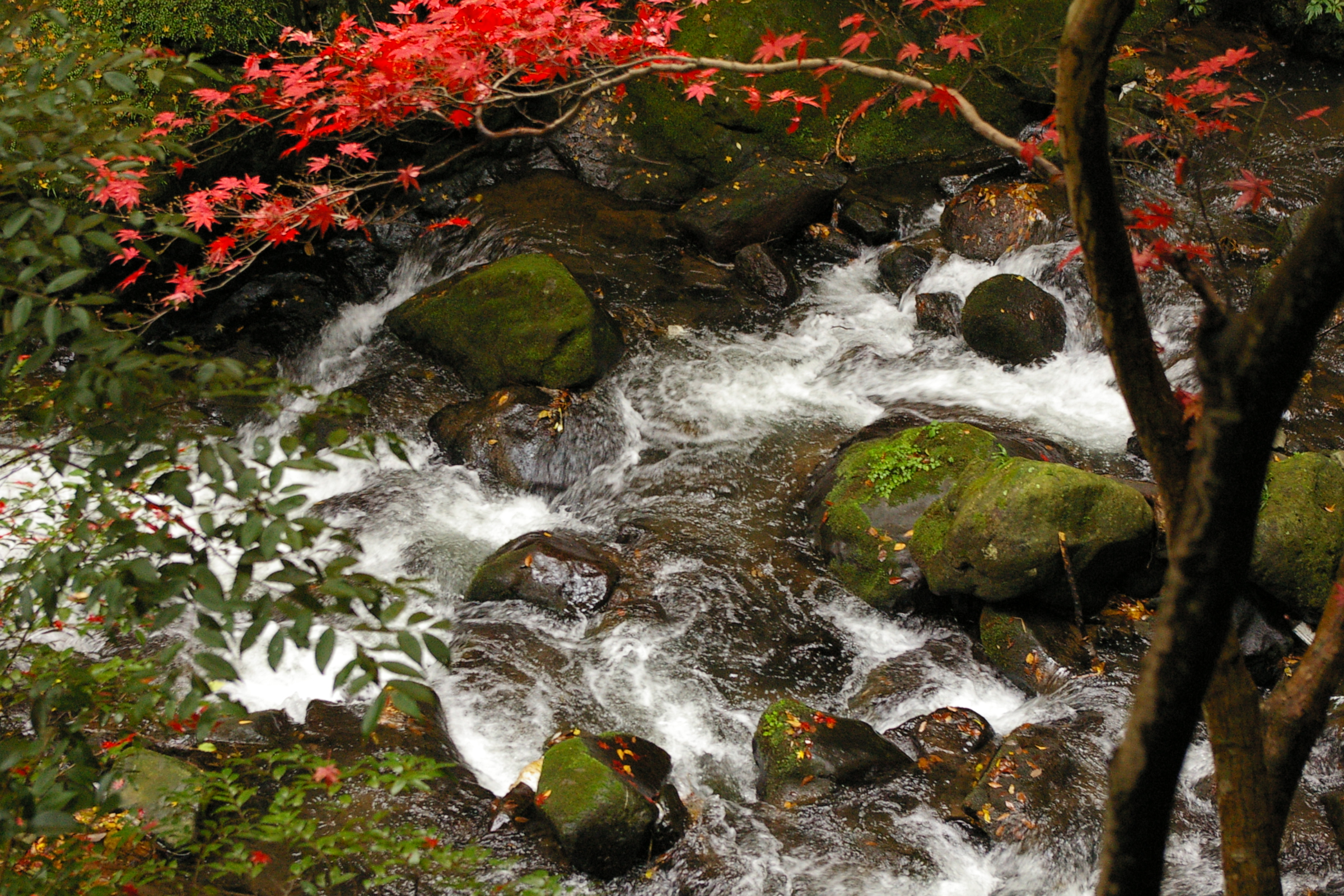
- Yugawara Onsen
- Interactive map of Okuyugawara Prefectural Natural Park
- Location: Kanagawa Prefecture, Japan
- Area: 19.32 km^{2} (7.46 sq mi)
- Established: 18 October 1960

Okuyugawara Prefectural Natural Park (県立奥湯河原自然公園, Kenritsu Okuyugawara shizen kōen) is a Prefectural Natural Park in Kanagawa Prefecture, Japan. Established in 1960, the park lies wholly within the municipality of Yugawara.

== See also ==
- National Parks of Japan
