= Yokohama Municipal Children's Botanical Garden =

Botanical garden in Kanagawa Prefecture, Japan

Coordinates: 35°26′00″N 139°34′38″E

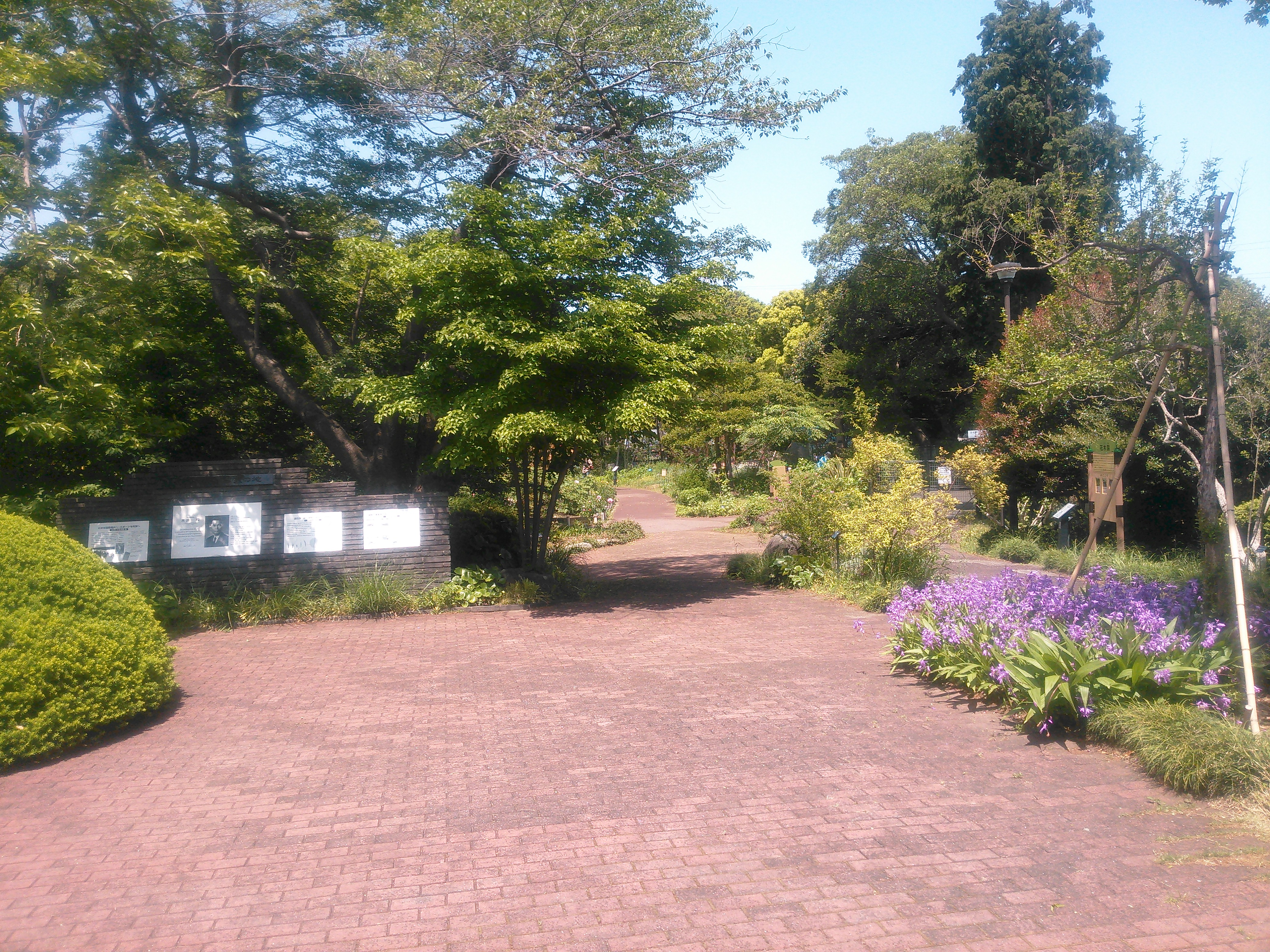
Botanical Garden

The Yokohama Municipal Children's Botanical Garden (横浜市こども植物園, Yokohama-shi Kodomo Shokubutsuen) is a botanical garden located at 3-122 Mutsukawa, Minami-ku, Yokohama, Kanagawa Prefecture, Japan. It is open most days; an admission fee is charged.

The garden was founded in 1979.

== See also ==
- List of botanical gardens in Japan
- Yokohama War Cemetery - located across from the park
