= Jinba Sagamiko Prefectural Natural Park =

Prefectural Natural park in Japan

- 県立陣馬相模湖自然公園
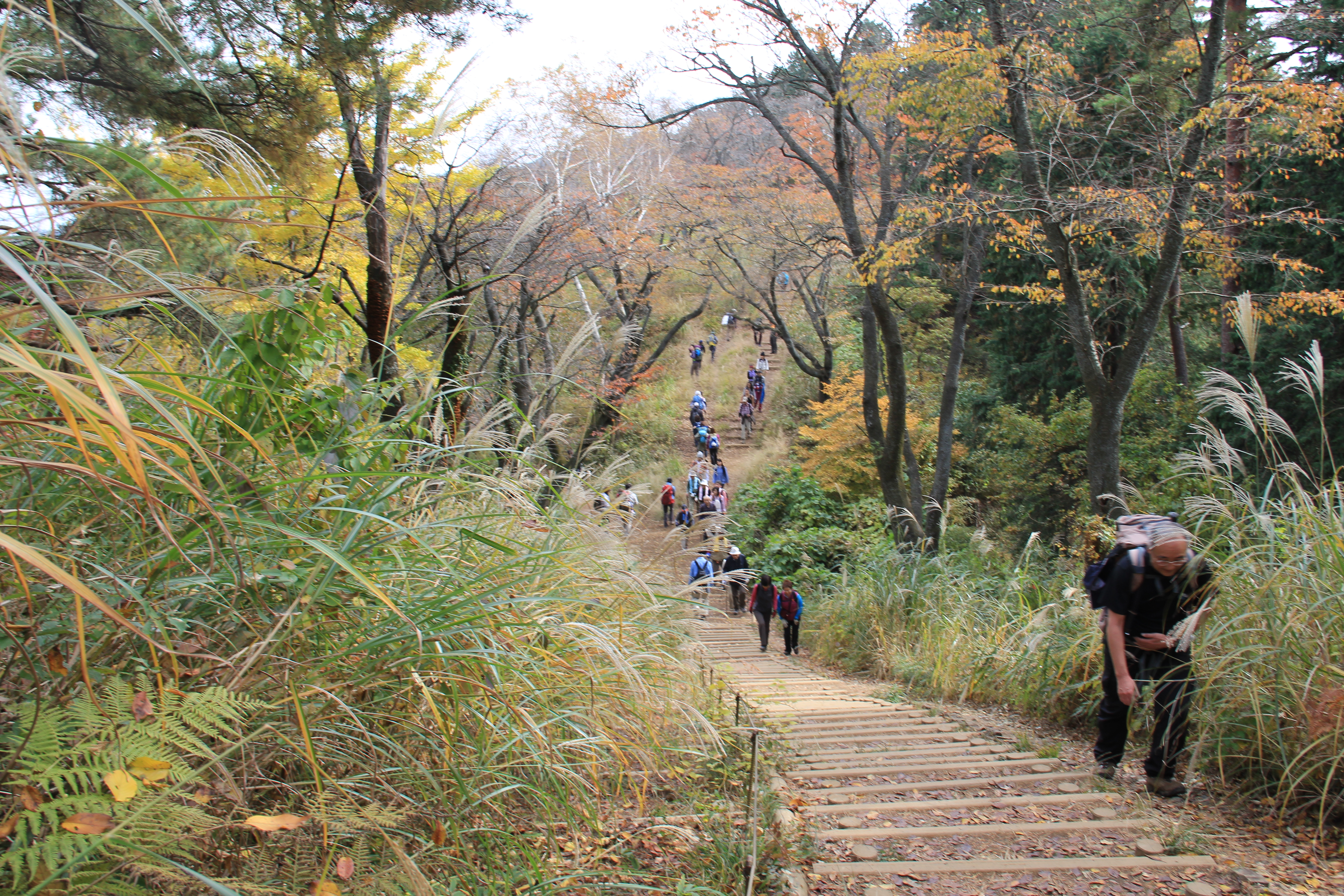
- Mount Jinba
- Interactive map of Jinba Sagamiko Prefectural Natural Park
- Location: Kanagawa Prefecture, Japan
- Coordinates: 35°36′12″N 139°10′39″E
- Area: 37.85 km^{2} (14.61 sq mi)
- Established: 16 December 1983

Jinba Sagamiko Prefectural Natural Park (県立陣馬相模湖自然公園, Kenritsu Jinba Sagami-ko shizen kōen) is a Prefectural Natural Park in Kanagawa Prefecture, Japan. Established in 1983, it derives its name from Mount Jinba and Lake Sagami. The park lies wholly within the municipality of Sagamihara.

== See also ==
- National Parks of Japan
