= Tanzawa-Ōyama Quasi-National Park =

Quasi National park in Japan

- 丹沢大山国定公園
- IUCN category V (protected landscape/seascape)
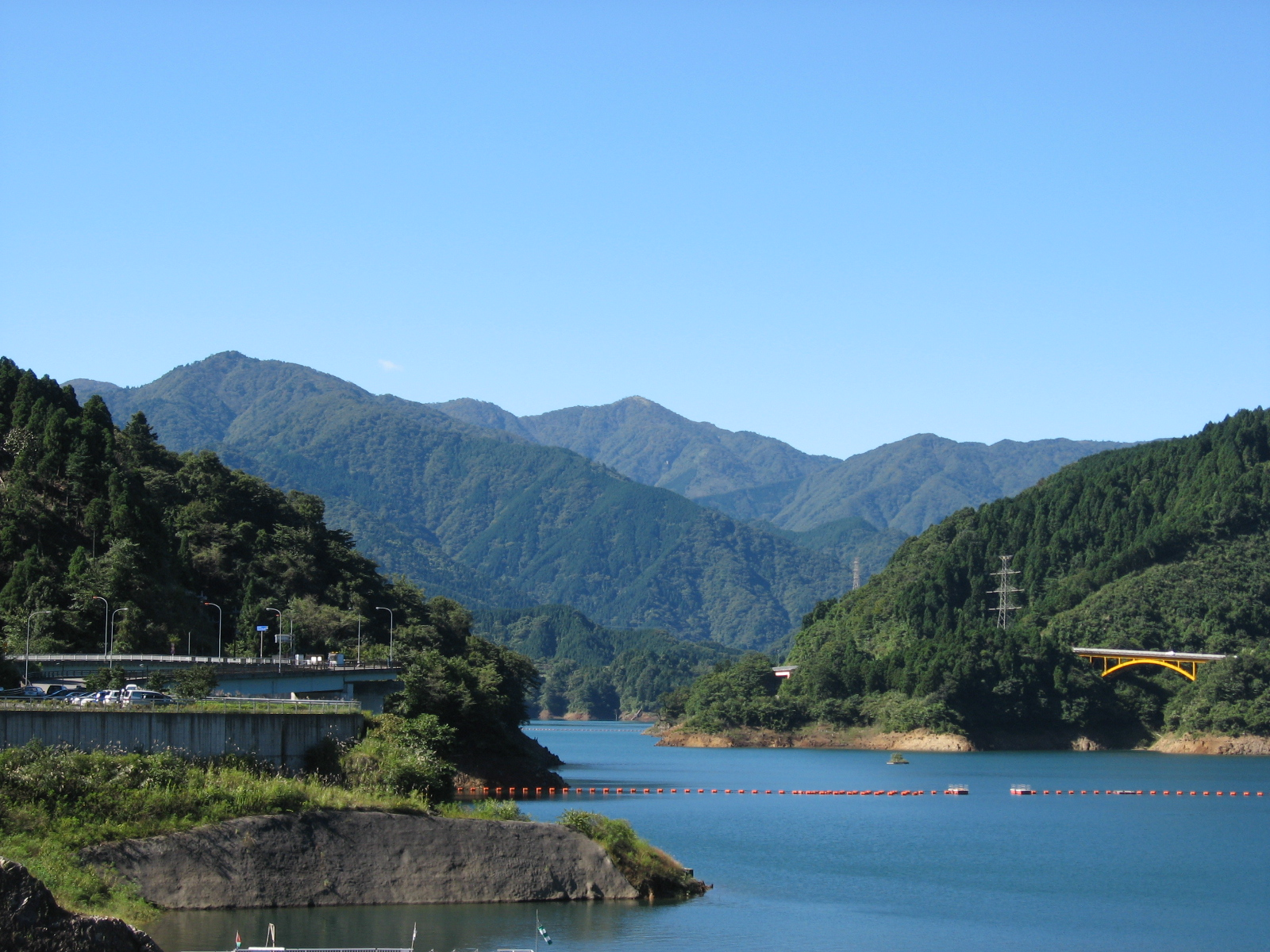
- Lake Miyagase and Mount Hiru

- Location within Japan
- Location: Honshū, Japan
- Coordinates: 35°26′33″N 139°09′37″E
- Area: 27,572 ha (68,130 acres)
- Established: March 25, 1965
- Governing body: Kanagawa Prefecture

Tanzawa-Ōyama Quasi-National Park (丹沢大山国定公園, Tanzawa-Ōyama Kokutei Kōen) is a quasi-national park in the Kantō region of Honshū in Japan. It is rated a protected landscape (category V) according to the IUCN. The park includes the Tanzawa Mountains, Miyagase Dam and its surrounding forests, Hayato Great Falls, and the religious sites of Mount Ōyama in the mountains of western Kanagawa Prefecture.

In May 1960, a 38,762-hectare area of western Kanagawa Prefecture in the Tanzawa Mountains was designated for protection as the Tanzawa-Ōyama Prefectural Natural Park. The central portion of this area was further designated a quasi-national park on March 25, 1965.

Like all Quasi-National Parks in Japan, the park is managed by the local prefectural governments.

The park spans the borders of the municipalities of Atsugi, Hadano, Isehara, Kiyokawa, Matsuda, Sagamihara, and Yamakita.

== See also ==
- List of national parks of Japan
- Wildlife Protection Areas in Japan
