= Ryoko Mima =

Japanese model and entertainer (born 1984)

- 美馬 怜子
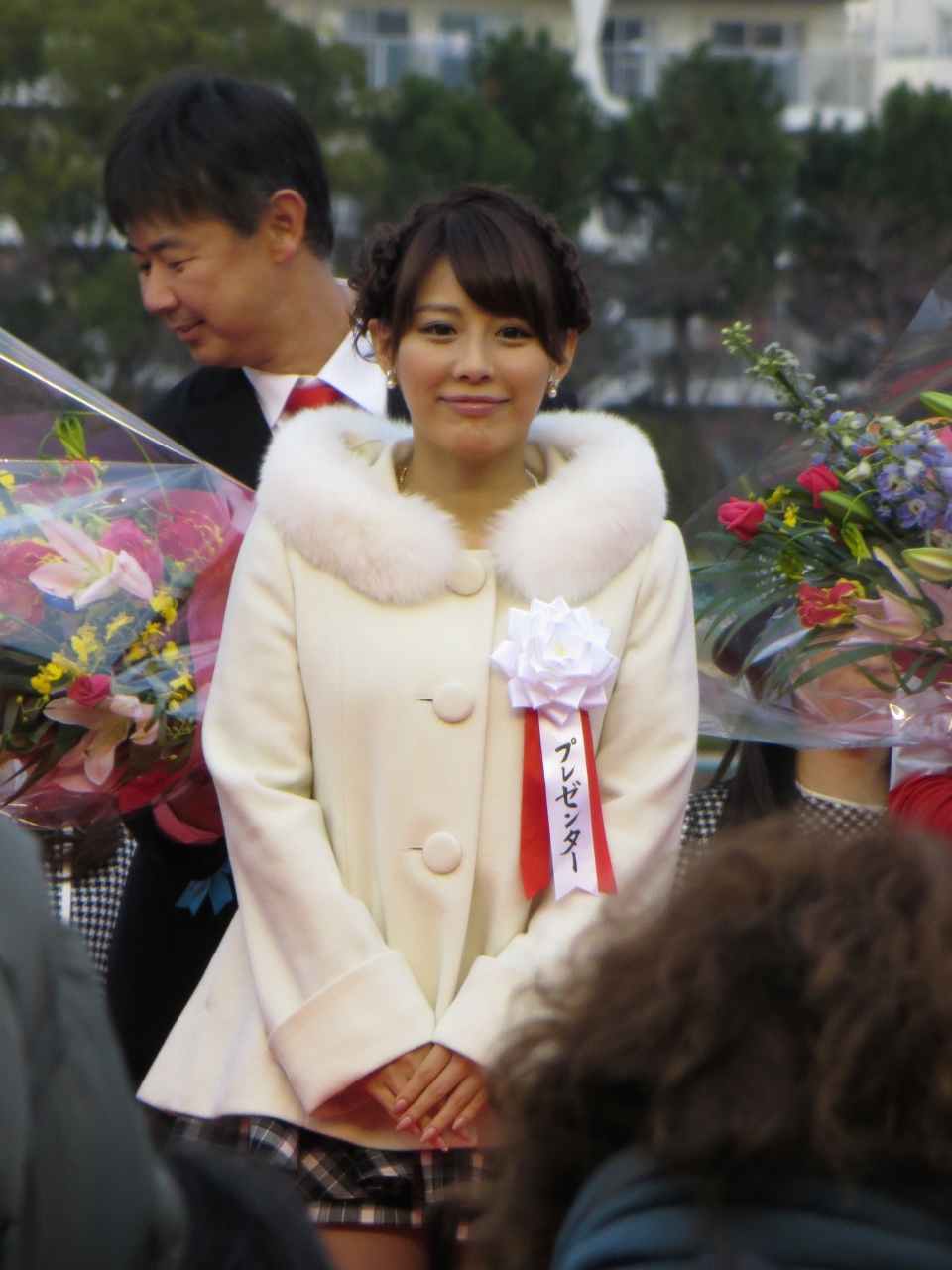
- Born: May 27, 1984 (age 41); Kanagawa Prefecture, Japan
- Occupations: model; entertainer
- Years active: 2006 -
- Agent: Cent Force (2010 - 2016)
- Height: 1.53 m (5 ft 0 in)
- Website: Official profile

Ryoko Mima (美馬 怜子, Mima Ryōko; born May 27, 1984, in Kanagawa Prefecture, Japan) is a Japanese model and entertainer. She graduated from Seisen Jogakuin Junior High School and Ferris University Faculty of Letters and Department of English.

== Biography ==
Mima has a success as a model for "Maquia Beauty's" of Maquia.

In 2010, she became the weather forecaster of the Tokyo Broadcasting System programs, Hayazuba tsu! Nama Tamago and Asazuba tsu!.

On September 1, 2010, during the planning of, Mima interviewed South Korean actress Kim Tae-hee from the South Korean drama, Iris, which aired on TBS at the time. Because she was a Korean Wave fan, Korean was her second foreign language at Ferris University Faculty of Letters.

Mima knows horse racing, she has a weather casting and modeling boundaries and horse racing as a communication. It was during a broadcast of Hayazuba tsu! Nama Tamago when she shows a horse racing topic in a sports newspaper, and later expected her own race. In 2011, Orfevre won the 78th Tokyo Yūshun, and it was allowed to hit.

== Filmography ==
=== Magazines ===
Year	Title	Notes
2006	Maquia	"Maquia Beauty's"
2007	The Strawberry News	

=== TV series ===
Year	Title	Network	Notes
	Kurii mu Nantoka	TV Asahi	
2008	Yokohama TV Bookmark	TVK	
2008	Leader's How to Book Jō Shima Site	TV Asahi	
2010	Asazuba tsu!	TBS	Weather caster
2010	Hayazuba tsu! Nama Tamago	TBS	Weather caster
2010	All-Star Thanksgiving	TBS	
2012	Keiba-ba no Tatsujin	GCH	
	Hitoshi Kusano no Studio Gate J.	GCH	
2013	Take Five: Oretachi wa Ai o Nusumeru ka	TBS	Episode 4
2013	Uman Chu	KTV	
	Keiba Beat	KTV	Quasi-regular guest
2014	Channel-sei Kaiten TV All Zap!	BS Sky PerfecTV!	
2014	Uma Zukitsu!	Fuji TV	

=== Radio series ===
Year	Title	Network	Notes
2013	Sports Densetsu	NBS	Narrator

=== Advertisements ===
Title	Notes
Sanwa Money	
Suntory The Premium Malt	
Kai Kai Razor Dansei-yō Kamisori	

=== Stills ===
Year	Title	Notes
2007	Casio "Ekusuwādo"	

=== Photo albums ===
Year	Title	Notes
2011	Weathery. ワニブックス. September 2011. ISBN 978-4847043932.	Wani Books
2014	After the Rain. 小学館. 2 December 2014. ISBN 978-4096820995.	Shogakukan
