= Sagami Women's University =

Private college in Sagamihara, Japan

Coordinates: 35°32′06″N 139°25′41″E

- 相模女子大学; Sagami joshi daigaku
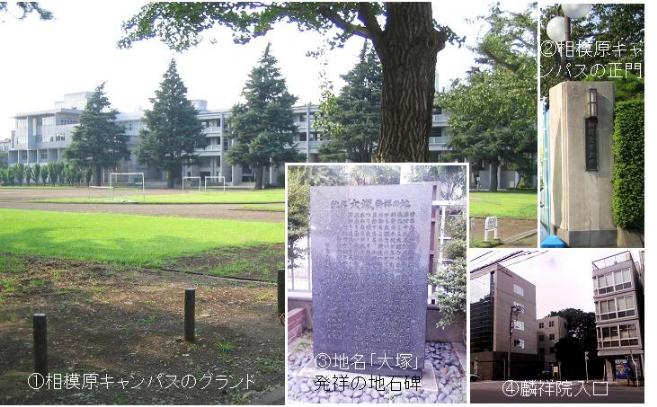
- Type: Private
- Established: 1949
- Location: Sagamihara, Kanagawa, Japan
- Website: Official website

Sagami Women's University (相模女子大学, Sagami joshi daigaku) is a private women's college in Sagamihara, Kanagawa Prefecture, Japan.

The predecessor of the school was founded in 1900 in Hongō, Bunkyo-ku, Tokyo, and was the fourth oldest women's college in Japan. It moved to its present location in Sagamihara in 1946 and was chartered as a university in 1949.
