= Tanzawa-Ōyama Prefectural Natural Park =

Prefectural natural park in Japan

- 県立丹沢大山自然公園
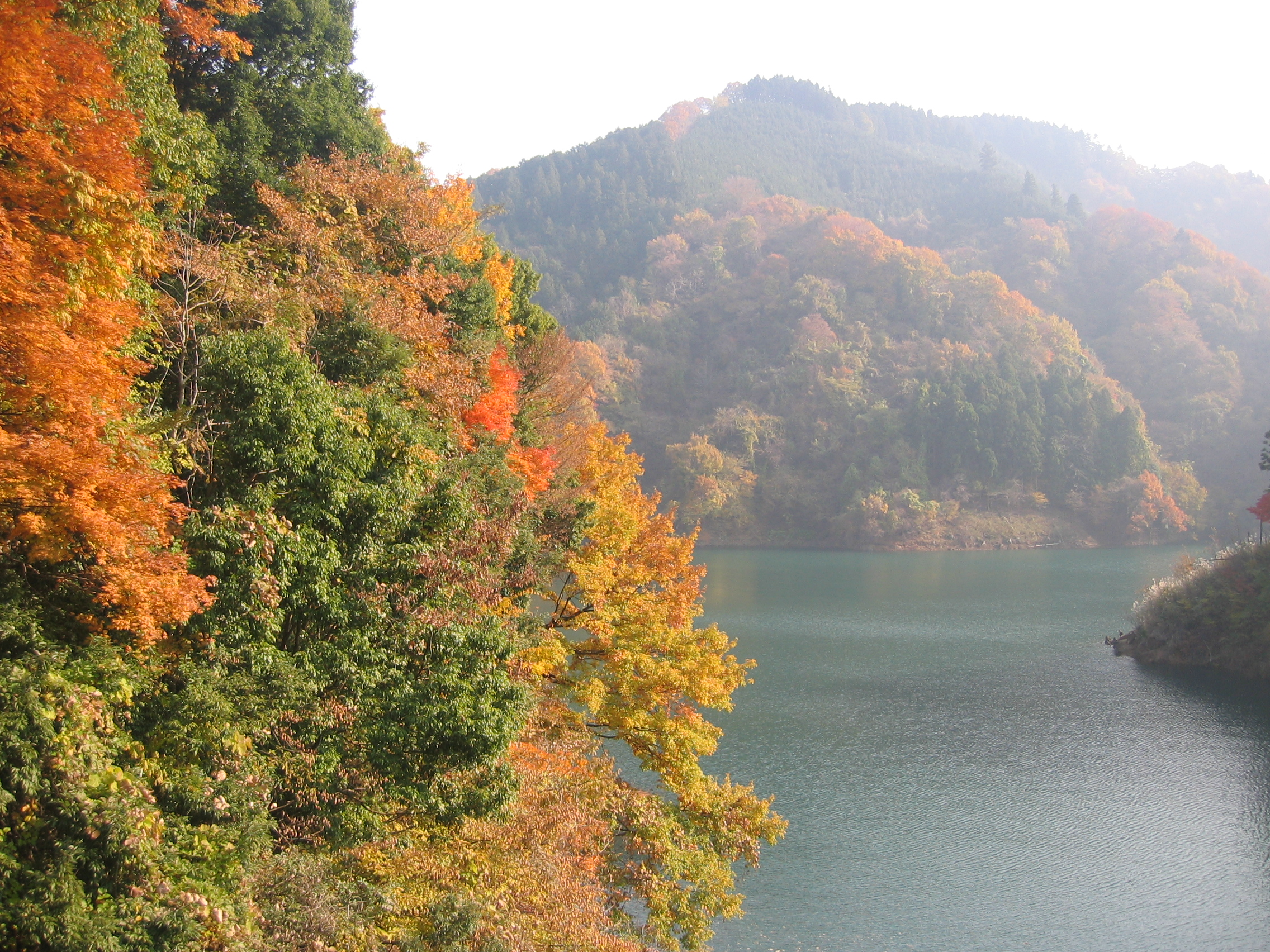
- Lake Miyagase
- Interactive map of Tanzawa-Ōyama Prefectural Natural Park
- Location: Kanagawa Prefecture, Japan
- Coordinates: 35°28′N 139°11′E
- Area: 113.55 km^{2} (43.84 sq mi)
- Established: 2 May 1960

Tanzawa-Ōyama Prefectural Natural Park (県立丹沢大山自然公園, Kenritsu Tanzawa-Ōyama shizen kōen) is a Prefectural Natural Park in Kanagawa Prefecture, Japan. Established in 1960, it derives its name from the Tanzawa Mountains. The park spans the borders of the municipalities of Aikawa, Atsugi, Hadano, Isehara, Kiyokawa, Sagamihara, and Yamakita.

== See also ==
- National Parks of Japan
- Tanzawa-Ōyama Quasi-National Park
