= Kantō Mountains =

Mountain range on the west side of the Kantō Plain in central Japan

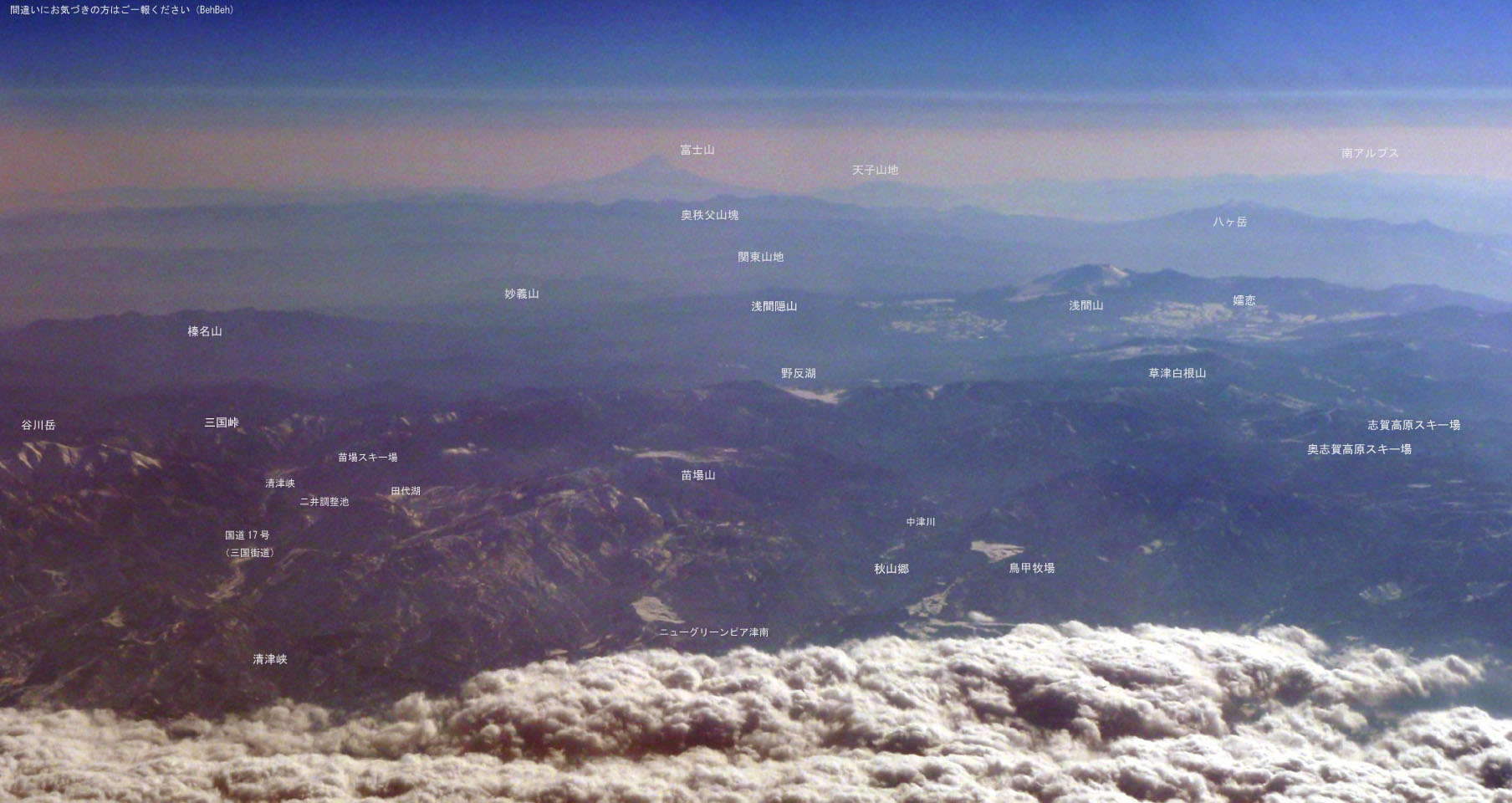
- View of Kantō Mountains with Mount Fuji in the background.

Highest point
- Peak: Kitaokusenjo
- Elevation: 2,601 m (8,533 ft)

Naming
- Native name: 關東山地 (Japanese); Kantō-Sanchi (Japanese)

Geography
- Location within Japan
- Country: Japan
- Region: Kantō region
- Range coordinates: 35°52′N 138°40′E
- Parent range: Kantō Range

Kantō Mountains or Kantō Range (Japanese: 関東山地) is a mountain range on the west side of the Kanto Plain in central Japan. It stretches from the western part of the Kantō region to the eastern part of the Chubu region across multiple prefectures and the capital city of Tokyo.

== Geography ==
Map of Kanto

The Kantō Range extends along the western side of the Kanto Plain from the western part of the Kantō region to the eastern part of the Chubu region. It spans Tokyo and the Gunma, Saitama, Kanagawa, Nagano, and Yamanashi prefectures.

The mountains divide the Kantō Plain from Chūbu region and consists of two subranges. The Chichibu Mountains in the north featuring steep slopes and canyon valleys and the Tanzawa–Misaka–Tenshu ranges in the south with an upland terrain partially buried by ancient deposits from Mount Fuji.

== Demographics and economy ==
Part of the mountains form the protected Chichibu Tama Kai National Park. The population is sparse with mountain communities populating valley settlements, such as those along Daibosatsu and Karisaka passes, which are historically linked by footpaths and terraced farms. It hosts culturally significant mountain worship sites and pilgrimage destinations. Historically dependent on mountain agriculture, and forestry, tourism such as cultural site visits and hiking contribute to the modern economy. It has various access points by road, and high speed rail network.

== Flora and fauna ==
The mountains include densely-forested regions, with broad-leaved trees consisting of Japanese beech, Judas and maple in the footslopes. At higher elevations, the slopes are covered by Japanese hemlock, Erman's birch and Veitch's fir trees. Flowering plants include Dogtooth Violet, and Azuma Shakunage. Animals include Asiatic black bear, Japanese serow, and Kajika frog. Birds found in the region include Japanese leaf warbler, red-flanked bluetail, Eurasian Bullfinch, and goldcrest.

== See also ==
- Tanzawa Mountains
