= Ray Simpson (soldier) =

Australian soldier (1926–1978)

Ray Simpson VC DCM
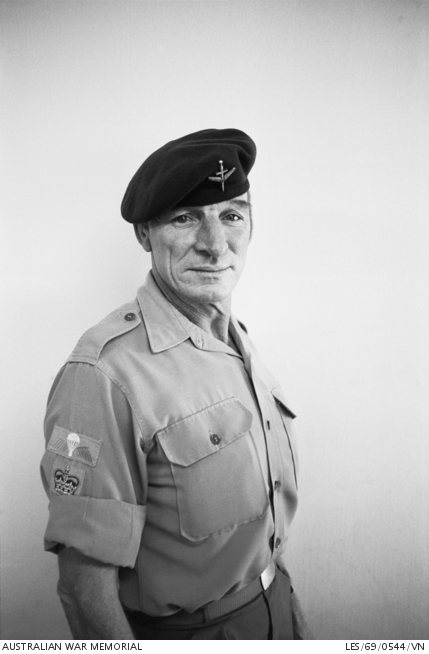
- Simpson in August 1969
- Born: Rayene Stewart Simpson; 16 February 1926; Redfern, New South Wales, Australia
- Died: 18 October 1978 (aged 52); Tokyo, Japan
- Burial place: Yokohama War Cemetery
- Military career
- Allegiance: Australia
- Branch: Australian Army
- Service years: 1944–1947; 1951–1966; 1967–1970
- Rank: Warrant Officer Class II
- Nickname: Simmo
- Units: Royal Australian Regiment; Special Air Service Company (RAR); 1 Commando Company; Australian Army Training Team Vietnam
- Conflicts: Second World War; Cowra breakout; South West Pacific theatre; New Guinea campaign; Korean War; Battle of Maryang San; Malayan Emergency; Vietnam War
- Awards: Victoria Cross; Distinguished Conduct Medal; Silver Star (United States); Bronze Star (United States)

Rayene Stewart Simpson, VC, DCM (16 February 1926 – 18 October 1978), was an Australian recipient of the Victoria Cross, the highest award for gallantry "in the face of the enemy" that can be awarded to members of the British and Commonwealth armed forces. Simpson received his award for actions in Kon Tum Province, South Vietnam, on 6 May 1969.

== Early life ==
Rayene Stewart Simpson was born on 16 February 1926 at Redfern in Sydney, the third child of New South Wales-born parents Robert William Simpson, labourer, and his wife Olga Maude, née Montgomery. Olga deserted her husband and children about 1931. Ray was separated from his siblings and placed in the Church of England Home for Boys in Carlingford. Educated at a local school and at Dumaresq Island Public School, Taree, he worked as a labourer.

== Military career ==
Simpson joined the Second Australian Imperial Force on 15 March 1944 and was posted to the 41st/2nd Battalion AIF, a training battalion that prepared soldiers for service in the Pacific campaigns. With this battalion, he was posted to Cowra as part of the prisoner of war camp garrison which had been reinforced after the Cowra breakout on 5 August 1944. He was subsequently posted to the 2/3rd Pioneer Battalion, while subsequent postings included the Advanced Ordnance Depot and the 26th Battalion. During this time he served in Morotai, Tarakan and Rabaul.

Demobilized in January 1947, Simpson spent four years working in various jobs in Australia and Papua New Guinea, before re-enlisting in the Army in 1951 to serve in the Korean War with the 3rd Battalion, Royal Australian Regiment. He was promoted to lance corporal on 30 November 1951 and again to corporal on 21 January 1953. He married Shoko Sakai, a Japanese citizen, on 5 March 1952.

Simpson was posted to the 2nd Battalion, Royal Australian Regiment in January 1954, where he was promoted to sergeant in 1955, serving in Malaya from October 1955 for the next two years. He was subsequently posted to 1st Special Air Service Company (SAS) in November 1957 and served with that unit until selected as one of the initial group members of the Australian Army Training Team Vietnam (AATTV) sent to assist South Vietnamese forces in July 1962. A year later, he returned to the SAS in Australia and served there for the next twelve months.

His second tour of duty with AATTV in Vietnam commenced in July 1964, after being promoted to warrant officer class II. During his second tour, he was awarded the Distinguished Conduct Medal for his actions when a patrol was ambushed at Tako on 16 September. Simpson, although severely wounded in the leg, held off the enemy while he called for assistance by radio. He and his men repelled several enemy assaults until help arrived, and none too soon as their ammunition was almost gone and Simpson was weak from loss of blood. He was evacuated by helicopter to the 6th Field Hospital at Nha Trang and later convalesced in Tokyo. On return to Australia, he was posted to the 1st Battalion, Royal New South Wales Regiment (Commando) in Sydney in January 1966.

On 16 May 1966, Simpson left the army for a second time, but re-enlisted in Saigon a year later for his third period of service with the AATTV, during which he was awarded the Victoria Cross. He also received the United States Silver Star and Bronze Star for his actions in Vietnam.

=== Victoria Cross ===
Simpson was 43 years old, and a warrant officer class II in the AATTV, when he was awarded the Victoria Cross. On 6 May 1969, in Kon Tum Province, Simpson rescued a wounded fellow warrant officer and carried out an unsuccessful attack on a strong enemy position. On 11 May he fought alone against heavy odds to cover the evacuation of a number of casualties. Simpson was presented his Victoria Cross by Queen Elizabeth II, at Government House in Sydney, on 1 May 1970.

== Victoria Cross citation ==
The citation in the Commonwealth of Australia Gazette of 28 August 1969, which announced Simpson's award reads:

Government House,

Canberra, ACT 2600

21 August 1969

HER Majesty The Queen has been graciously pleased to bestow the award of the Victoria Cross upon the following member of the Royal Australian Infantry Corps For most conspicuous bravery.

VICTORIA CROSS

Warrant Officer, Class 2, Rayene Stewart Simpson, DCM Warrant Officer Simpson enlisted initially in 1944 He has seen active service in the Pacific, Korea, Malaysia and Vietnam where he is now serving his third tour.

On 6 May 1969, Warrant Office Simpson was serving as Commander of 232nd Mobile Strike Force Company of 5th Special Forces Group on a search and clear operation in Kontum Province, near the Laotion border. When one of his platoons became heavily engaged with the enemy, he led the remainder of his company to its assistance. Disregarding the dangers involved, he placed himself at the front of his troops, thus becoming a focal point of enemy fire, and personally led the assault on the left flank of the enemy position. As the company moved forward, an Australian warrant officer commanding one of the platoons was seriously wounded and the assault began to falter. Warrant Officer Simpson, at great personal risk and under heavy enemy fire, moved across open ground, reached the wounded warrant officer and carried him to a position of safety. He then returned to his company where, with complete disregard for his safety, he crawled forward to within ten metres of the enemy and threw grenades into their positions. As darkness fell, and being unable to break into the enemy position, Warrant Officer Simpson ordered his company to withdraw. He then threw smoke grenades and, carrying a wounded platoon leader, covered the withdrawal of the company together with five indigenous soldiers. His leadership and personal bravery in this action were outstanding.

On 11th May 1969, in the same operation, Warrant Officer Simpson's battalion commander was killed and an Australian Warrant Officer and several indigenous soldiers were wounded. In addition, one other Australian Warrant Officer who had been separated from the majority of his troops was contained in the area by enemy fire. Warrant Officer Simpson quickly organised two platoons of indigenous soldiers and several advisors and led them to the position of the contact. On reaching the position the element with Warrant Officer Simpson came under heavy fire and all but a few of the soldiers with him fell back Disregarding his own safety he moved forward in the face of accurate enemy machine gun fire, in order to cover the initial evacuation of the casualties. The wounded were eventually moved out of the line of enemy fire, which all this time was directed at Warrant Officer Simpson from close range. At the risk of almost certain death he made several attempts to move further forward towards his Battalion Commander's body but on each occasion he was stopped by heavy fire. Realising the position was becoming untenable and that priority should be given to extricating other casualties as quickly as possible, Warrant Officer Simpson alone and still under enemy fire covered the withdrawal of the wounded by personally placing himself between the wounded and the enemy From this position he fought on and by outstanding courage and valour was able to prevent the enemy advance until the wounded were removed from the immediate vicinity Warrant Officer Simpson's gallant and individual action and his coolness under fire were exceptional and were instrumental in achieving the successful evacuation of the wounded to the helicopter evacuation pad.

Warrant Officer Simpson's repeated acts of personal bravery in this operation were an inspiration to all Vietnamese, United States and Australian soldiers who served with him His conspicuous gallantry was in the highest tradition of the Australian Army

== Later life and death ==
Simpson took his final discharge from the army in May 1970. In 1972, he took up a position as administrative officer at the Australian Embassy in Tokyo. He died of cancer in Tokyo on 18 October 1978 and was buried at the Yokohama War Cemetery, Japan. His Victoria Cross and portrait are displayed at the Australian War Memorial in Canberra.
