= Politics of Kanagawa =

Politics of Kanagawa, as in all prefectures of Japan, takes place in the framework of local autonomy that is guaranteed by the Constitution and laid out in the Local Autonomy Law. The administration is headed by a governor directly elected by the people every four years in first-past-the-post elections. Legislation, the budget and the approval of personnel appointments, including the (in Kanagawa: three) vice governors, are handled by the prefectural assembly that is directly elected by the people every four years by single-non transferable vote.

Kanagawa is one of the most populous prefectures, second only to neighbouring Tokyo, and the only prefecture to contain three designated cities, among them the prefectural capital of Yokohama, the largest city of Japan.

== National representation ==
Kanagawa's electoral districts for the House of Representatives

Kanagawa is currently represented by 18 directly elected Representatives and temporarily seven Councillors (four elected every three years) in the national Diet.

For the House of Representatives, it is part of the Southern Kantō proportional representation block along with neighbouring Yamanashi and Chiba in the East. Representatives from Kanagawa in Liberal Democratic strongholds, the so-called "conservative kingdoms" (hoshu ōkoku), include Shinjirō Koizumi, the son of former Prime Minister Jun'ichirō Koizumi (11th district), Tarō Kōno (15th district), the son of former Liberal Democratic Party president Yōhei Kōno (17th district until his retirement in 2009) and former Internal Affairs Minister Yoshihide Suga (2nd district). The now ruling Democratic Party had lost all districts of Kanagawa in the 2005 "postal" election, but won 14 of the 18 seats in 2009, including the 16th district, a "conservative kingdom" until then, of ex-minister Yoshiyuki Kamei and his son Zentarō. In 2012, Liberal Democratic Party and Kōmeitō together won 15 seats in Kanagawa, two went to Your Party, the only Democrat to hold onto his seat was Hirofumi Ryū in the 9th district.

Under the postwar constitution, Kanagawa initially was represented by four Councillors electing two per election. As most two-member districts, it has often elected one Liberal Democrat and one Socialist. The longest serving Councillor from Kanagawa (1953–1983) was conservative Kenzō Kōno, House of Councillors president, brother of LDP faction leader Ichirō Kōno and uncle of representative Yōhei Kōno. In the 1990s, a reapportionment of Councillors gave Kanagawa one additional seat per election; another reapportionment effective in the 2013 and 2016 elections will bring the total to eight. The currently seven Councillors from Kanagawa are, as of August 2013, two members each of Liberal Democratic Party, Democratic Party and Your Party and one Kōmeitō member.

== Governor ==
Kanagawa's current governor is former news anchor Yūji Kuroiwa who was elected in the unified local elections in 2011 with support from Liberal Democrats, Democrats and Kōmeitō, i.e. as a de facto all-party candidate of the established non-Communist parties though the recently created Your Party and the network movement together supported the candidacy of Jun'ichi Tsuyuki who surpassed the Communist candidate and received more than a quarter of the vote.

Kuroiwa is the sixth elected governor since 1947. Past elected governors of Kanagawa were:

1. Iwatarō Uchiyama, 5 terms, 1947–1967,
2. Bungo Tsuda, 2 terms, 1967–1975,
3. Kazuji Nagasu, 5 terms, 1975–1995,
4. Hiroshi Okazawa, 2 terms, 1995–2003,
5. Shigefumi Matsuzawa, 2 terms, 2003–2011.

== Assembly ==
The Kanagawa Prefectural Assembly has currently 107 members. They are elected every four years in unified regional elections by single non-transferable vote (in single-member districts identical to first-past-the-post) in 47 electoral districts most of which correspond to the wards of designated cities, independent cities and counties of Kanagawa. In the most recent elections in April 2011, the Liberal Democratic Party remained strongest party with 40 seats, the Democratic Party won 29 and Yoshimi Watanabe's Your Party won 15 seats. Kōmeitō holds 10 assembly seats, the Japanese Communist Party is no longer represented since 2011. One seat held by members of the Kanagawa Network, part of the "network movement", the same national federation of consumer movements as the Tokyo Seikatsusha Network.

The current composition of the assembly is as follows (as of May 15, 2014):

Composition of the Kanagawa Prefectural Assembly
Parliamentary group	Seats
Liberal Democratic Party	42
Democratic Party – Kanagawa Club	27
Kōmeitō	10
Your Party	10
Kenseikai ("Prefectural political assembly")	6
Unity Party, Japan Restoration Party	6
Kanagawa Network	1
Shinsei Kanagawa Club	1
Kenmin mesen no reimei	1
Total including 3 vacant seats	107

The current 106th assembly president is Tokie Furusawa (LDP, Naka county electoral district), the 107th vice president is Takahiro Aihara (Kenseikai, Asao ward).
