= Kanagawa Prefecture =

Prefecture of Japan

Kanagawa Prefecture 神奈川県
- Prefecture

Japanese transcription(s)
  - Japanese: 神奈川県
  - Rōmaji: Kanagawa-ken
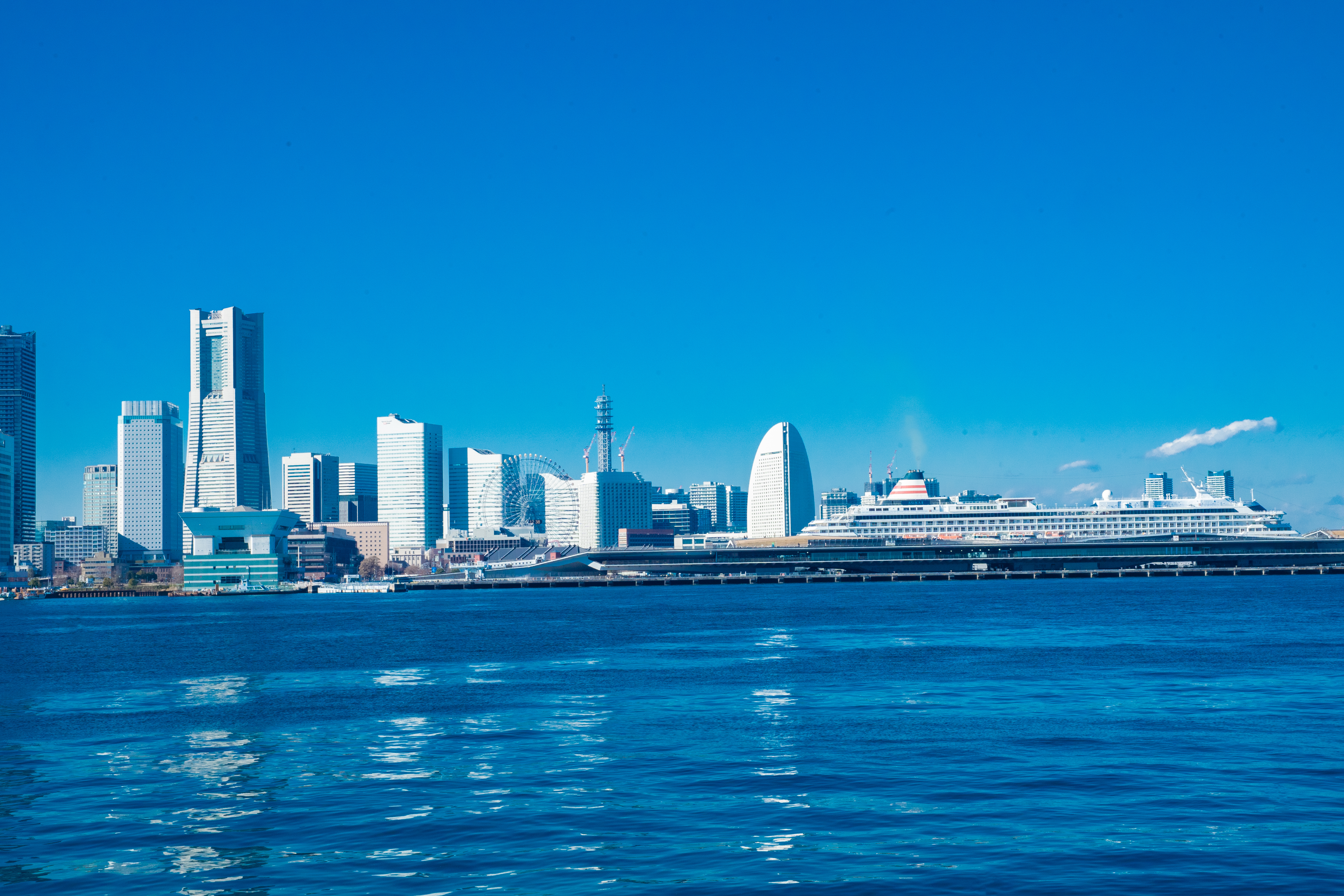
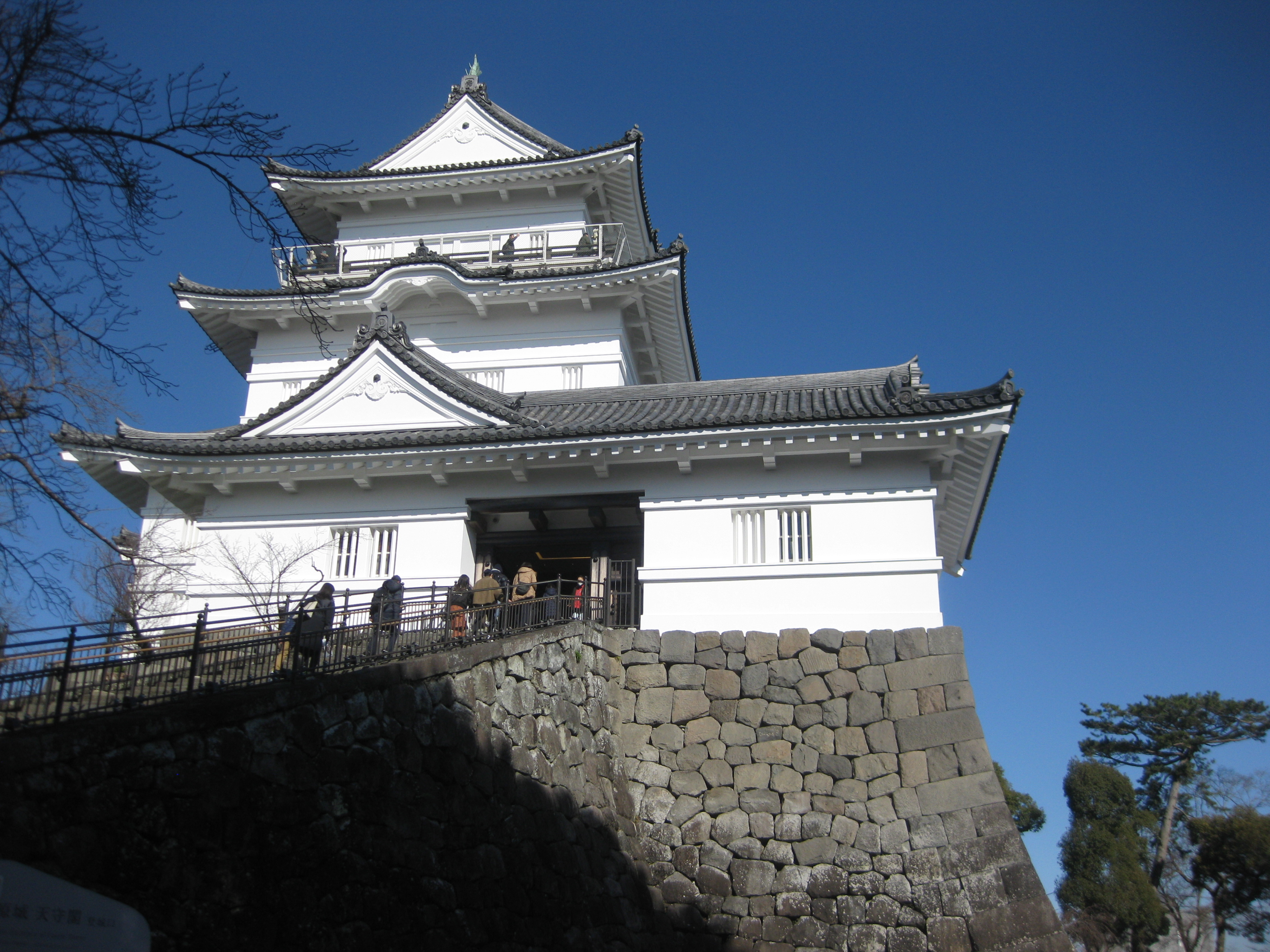
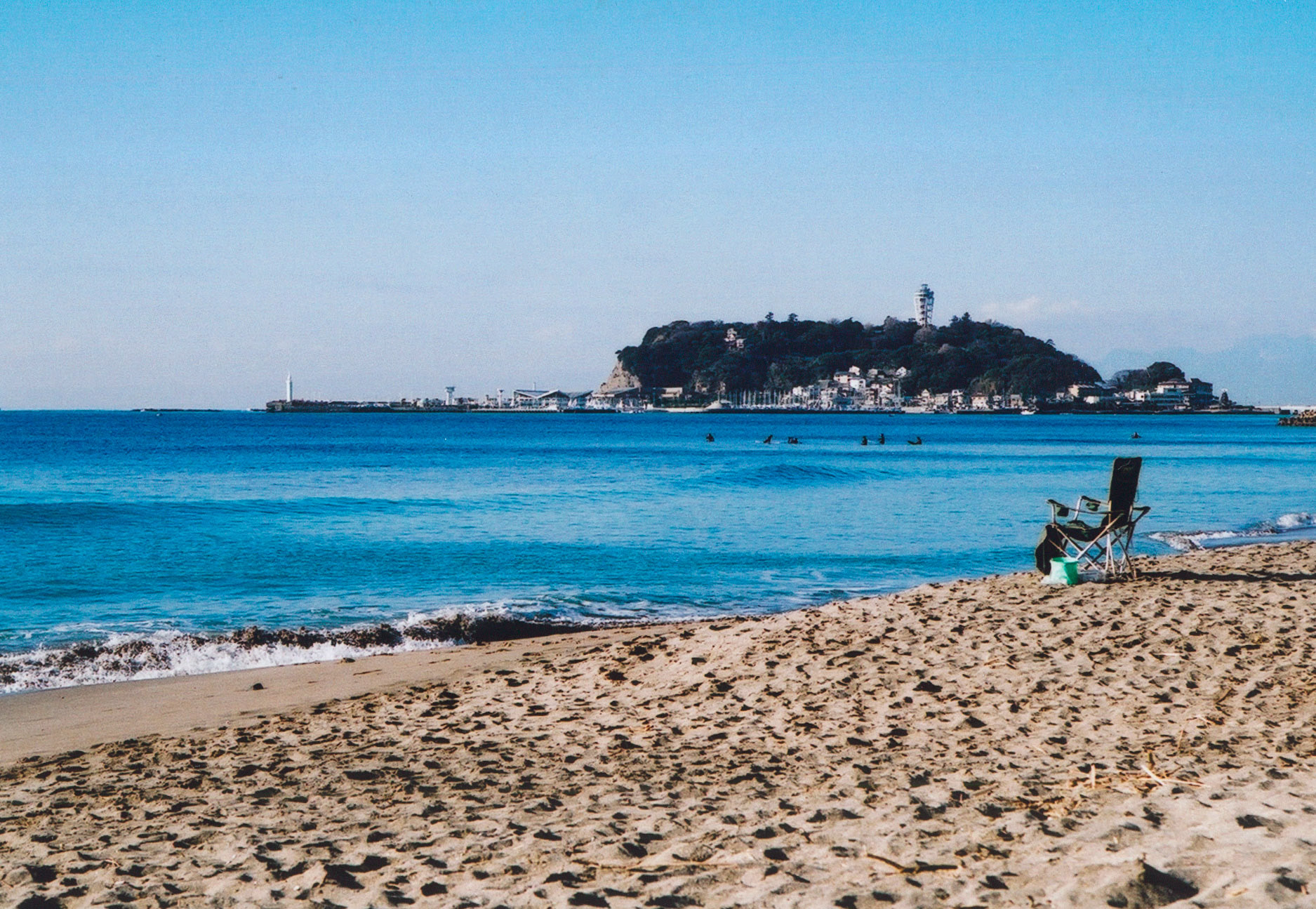
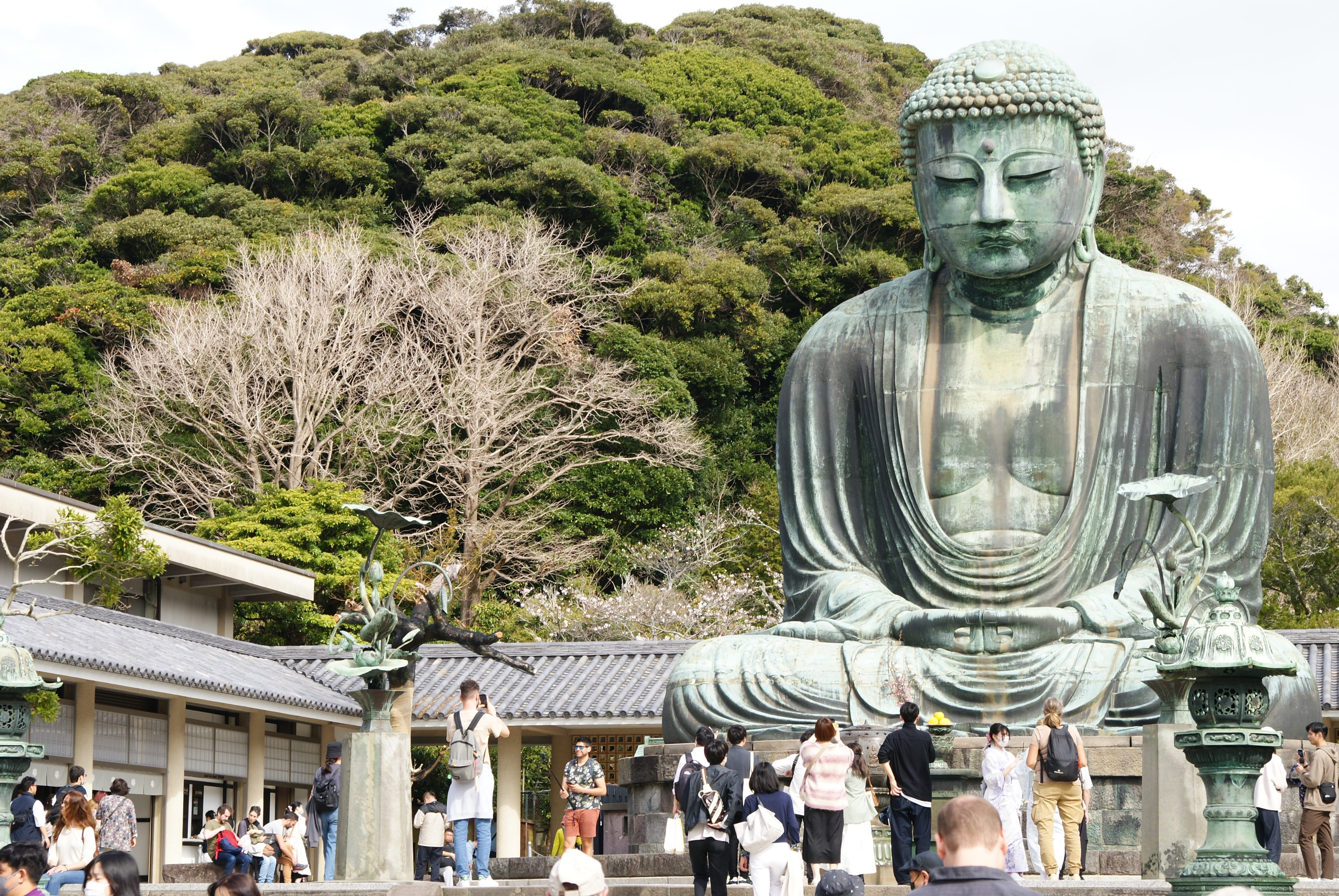
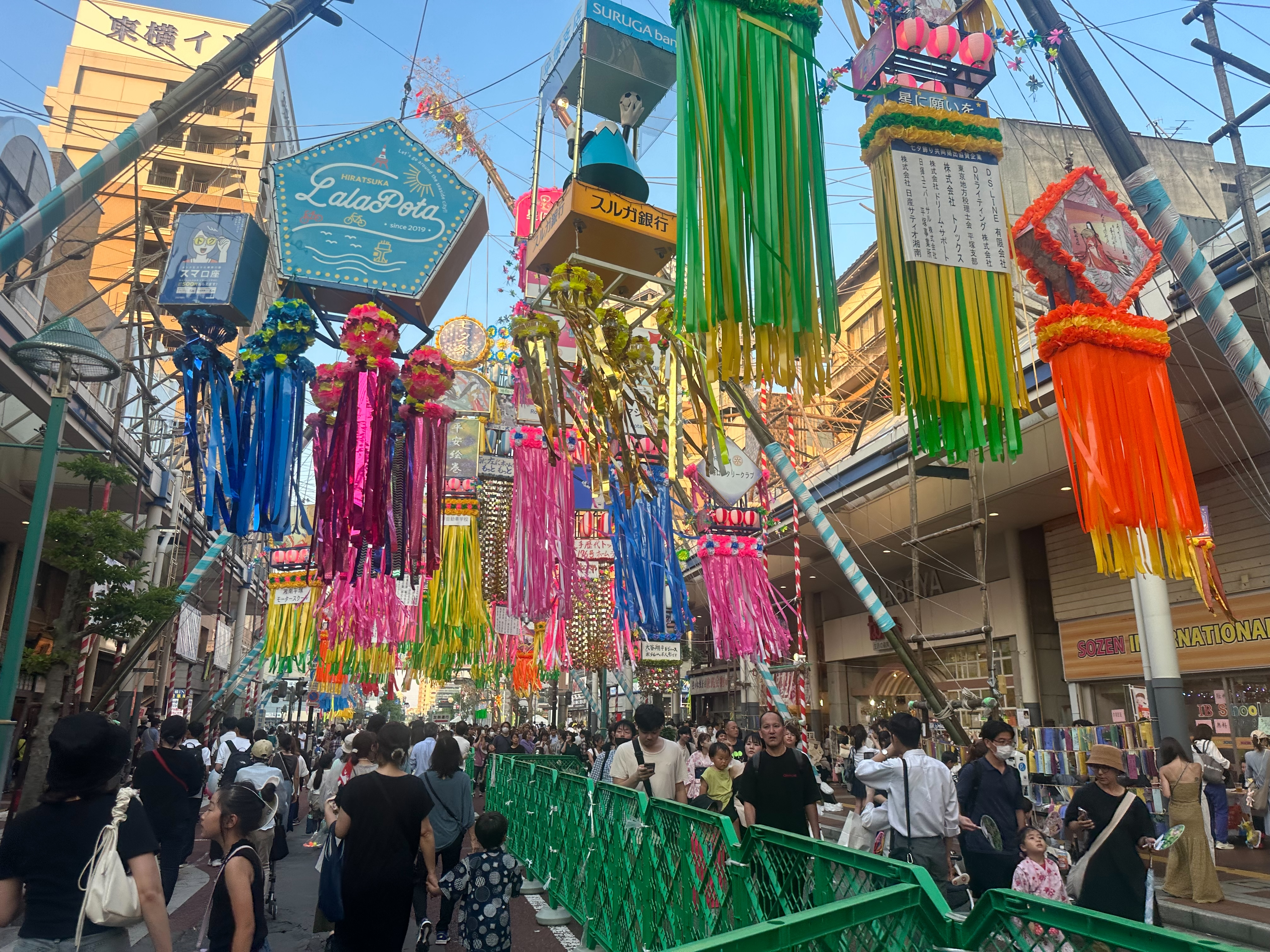
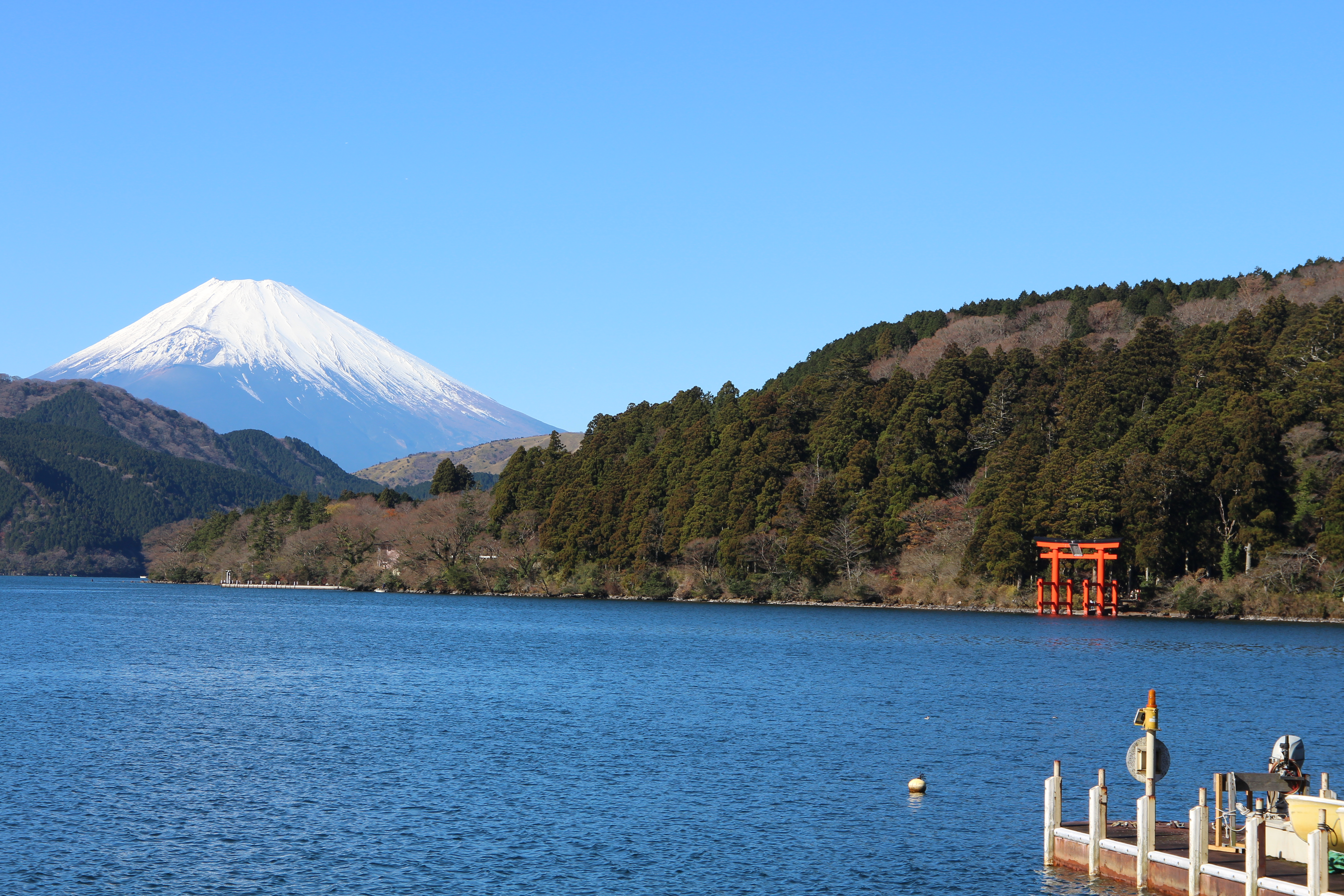
- Minato Mirai 21 and Yokohama Port Odawara Castle View of Enoshima, from Shōnan Beach Kōtoku-in Shōnan Hiratsuka Tanabata Festival Panoramic view of Mount Fuji and Lake Ashi

- Flag Symbol
- Anthem: Hikari arata ni
- Coordinates: 35°26′51.03″N 139°38′32.44″E
- Country: Japan
- Region: Kantō
- Island: Honshu
- Capital: Yokohama
- Subdivisions: Districts: 6, Municipalities: 33

Government
  - Governor: Yūji Kuroiwa (since April 2011)

Area
  - Total: 2,415.83 km^{2} (932.76 sq mi)
  - Rank: 43rd
- Highest elevation (Mount Hiru): 1,675 m (5,495 ft)

Population (February 29, 2020)
  - Total: 9,201,825
  - Rank: 2nd
  - Density: 3,770/km^{2} (9,800/sq mi)
  - Dialect: Kanagawa dialect

GDP
  - Total: JP¥35,159 billion US$259.7 billion (2022)
- ISO 3166 code: JP-14
- Website: www.pref.kanagawa.jp
- Symbols of Japan
- Bird: Common gull (Larus canus)
- Flower: Golden-rayed lily (Lilium auratum)
- Tree: Ginkgo (Ginkgo biloba)

Kanagawa Prefecture (神奈川県, Kanagawa-ken; Japanese pronunciation: [kä̀.nä́.ɡä̀.β̞ä̀, -ŋä̀.β̞ä̀, -ɡä́.β̞ä́, -ŋä́.β̞ä́, -ɡä́.β̞ä́.kè̞ɴ, -ŋä́.β̞ä́-]) is a prefecture of Japan located in the Kantō region of Honshu. Kanagawa Prefecture is the second-most populous prefecture of Japan at 9,221,129 (1 April 2022) and third-densest at 3,800 inhabitants per square kilometre (9,800/sq mi). Its geographic area of 2,415 km^{2} (932 sq mi) makes it fifth-smallest. Kanagawa Prefecture borders Tokyo to the north, Yamanashi Prefecture to the northwest and Shizuoka Prefecture to the west.

Yokohama is the capital and largest city of Kanagawa Prefecture and the second-largest city in Japan, with other major cities including Kawasaki, Sagamihara, and Fujisawa. Kanagawa Prefecture is located on Japan's eastern Pacific coast on Tokyo Bay and Sagami Bay, separated by the Miura Peninsula, across from Chiba Prefecture on the Bōsō Peninsula. Kanagawa Prefecture is part of the Greater Tokyo Area, the most populous metropolitan area in the world, with Yokohama and a number of its cities being major commercial hubs and southern suburbs of Tokyo. Kanagawa Prefecture was the political and economic center of Japan during the Kamakura period when Kamakura was the de facto capital and largest city of Japan as the seat of the Kamakura shogunate from 1185 to 1333. Kanagawa Prefecture is a popular tourist area in the Tokyo region, with Kamakura and Hakone being two popular side trip destinations.

== History ==
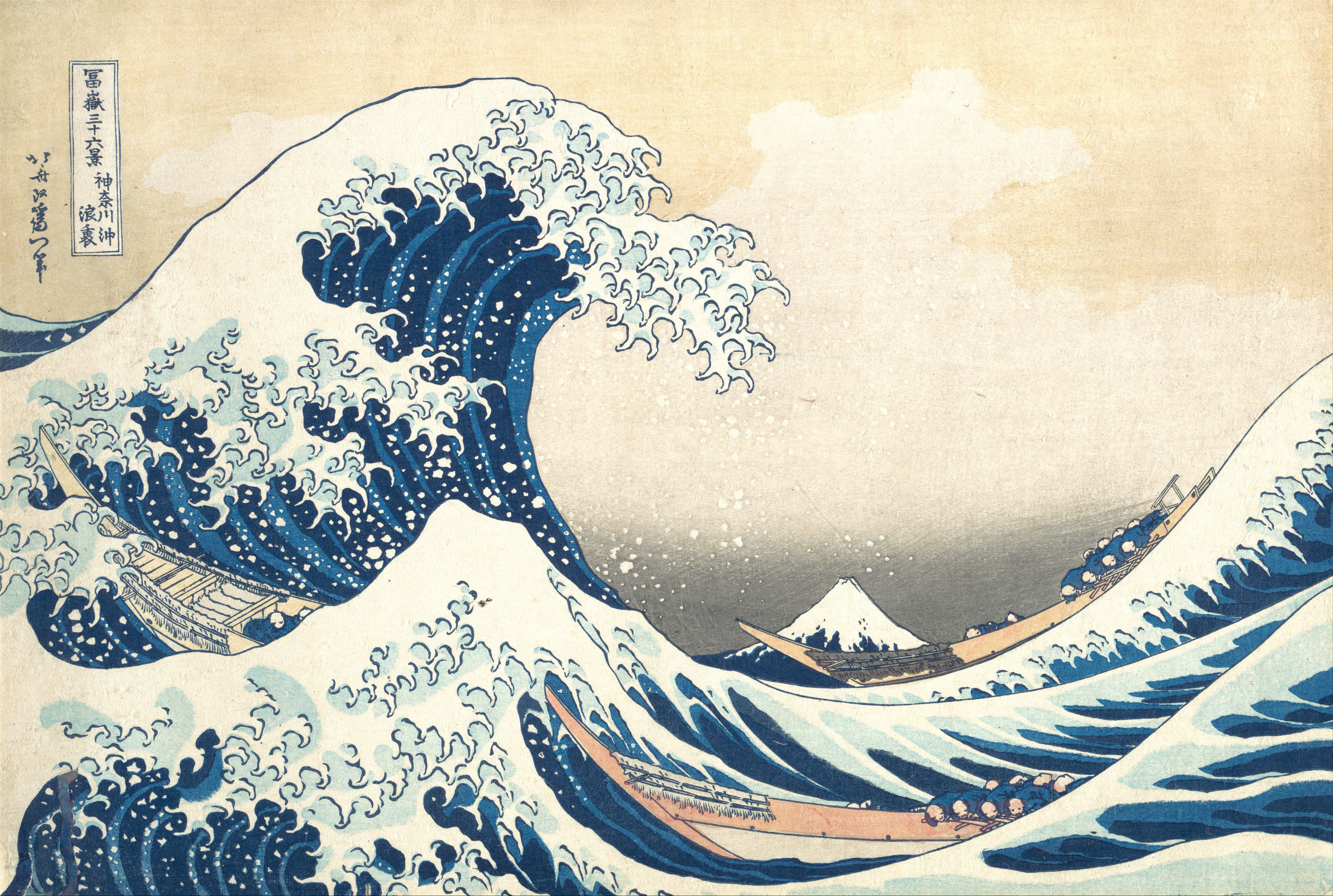
The Great Wave off Kanagawa original print

The prefecture has some archaeological sites going back to the Jōmon period (around 400 BCE). About 3,000 years ago, Mount Hakone produced a volcanic explosion which resulted in Lake Ashi on the western area of the prefecture.

It is believed that the imperial dynasty ruled this area from the 5th century onwards. In the ancient era, its plains were sparsely inhabited.

In medieval Japan, Kanagawa was part of the provinces of Sagami and Musashi. Kamakura in central Sagami was the capital of Japan during the Kamakura period (1185–1333).

During the Edo period, the western part of Sagami Province was governed by the daimyō of Odawara Castle, while the eastern part was directly governed by the Tokugawa shogunate in Edo (modern-day Tokyo).

Commodore Matthew Perry landed in Kanagawa in 1853 and 1854 and signed the Convention of Kanagawa to force open Japanese ports to the United States. Yokohama, the largest deep-water port in Tokyo Bay, was opened to foreign traders in 1859 after several more years of foreign pressure, and eventually developed into the largest trading port in Japan. Nearby Yokosuka, closer to the mouth of Tokyo Bay, developed as a naval port and now serves as headquarters for the U.S. 7th Fleet and the fleet operations of the Japan Maritime Self-Defense Force. After the Meiji period, a number of foreigners lived in Yokohama City, and visited Hakone. The Meiji government developed the first railways in Japan, from Shinbashi (in Tokyo) to Yokohama in 1872.

The epicenter of the 1923 Great Kantō earthquake was deep beneath Izu Ōshima (island) in Sagami Bay. It devastated Tokyo, the port city of Yokohama, surrounding prefectures of Chiba, Kanagawa, and Shizuoka, and caused widespread damage throughout the Kantō region. The sea receded as much as 400 metres from the shore at Manazuru Point, and then rushed back towards the shore in a great wall of water which swamped Mitsuishi-shima. At Kamakura, the total death toll from earthquake, tsunami, and fire exceeded 2,000 victims. At Odawara, ninety percent of the buildings collapsed immediately, and subsequent fires burned the rubble along with anything left standing.

Yokohama, Kawasaki, and other major cities were heavily damaged by the U.S. bombing in 1945. Total casualties amounted to more than several thousand. After the war, General Douglas MacArthur, the Supreme Commander of the Allied Powers for the Occupation of Japan, landed in Kanagawa, before moving to other areas. U.S. military bases still remain in Kanagawa, including Camp Zama (Army), Yokosuka Naval Base, Naval Air Facility Atsugi (Navy).

== Geography ==
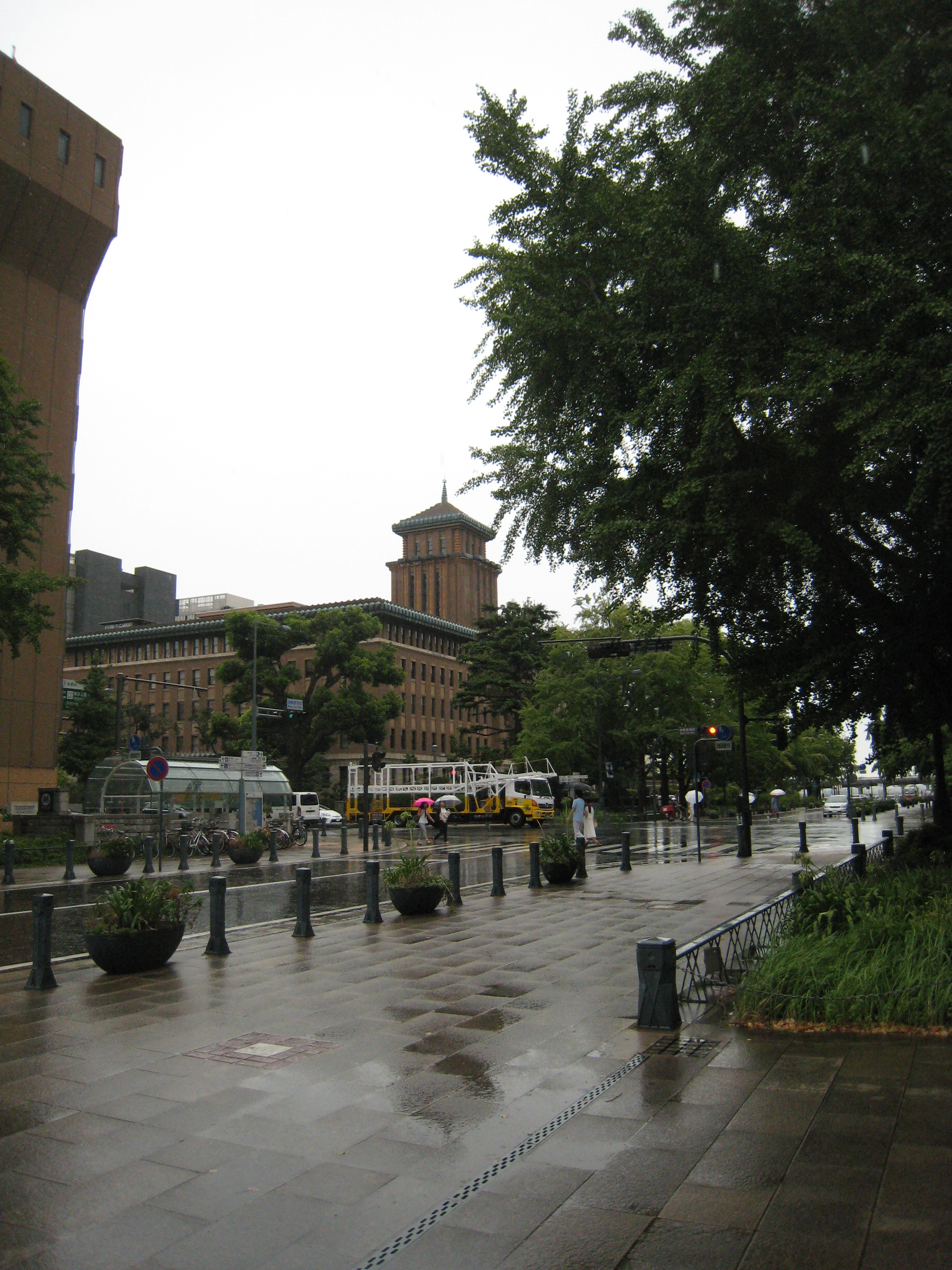
Prefectural office of Kanagawa in Yokohama

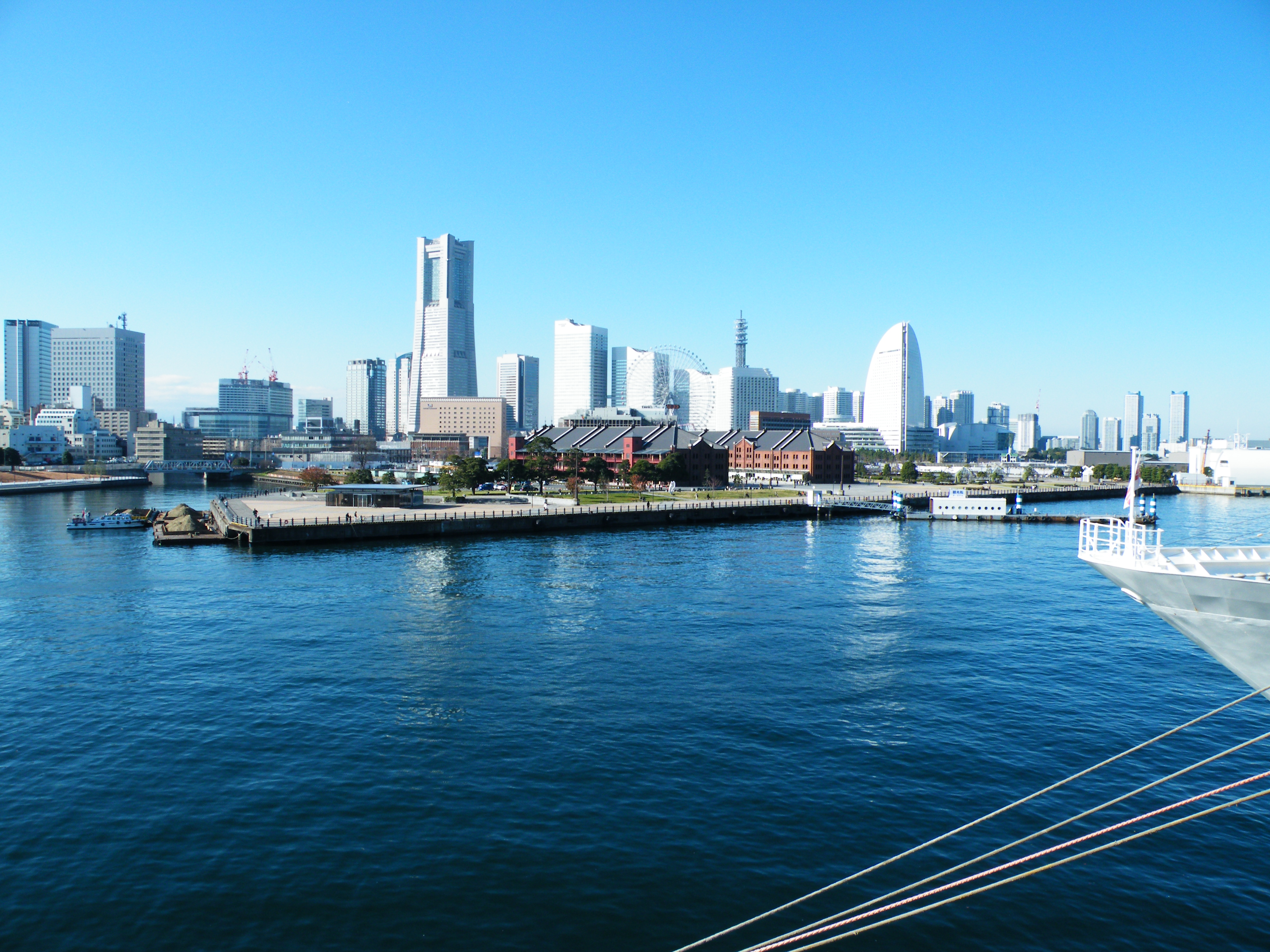
Minato Mirai 21, Yokohama

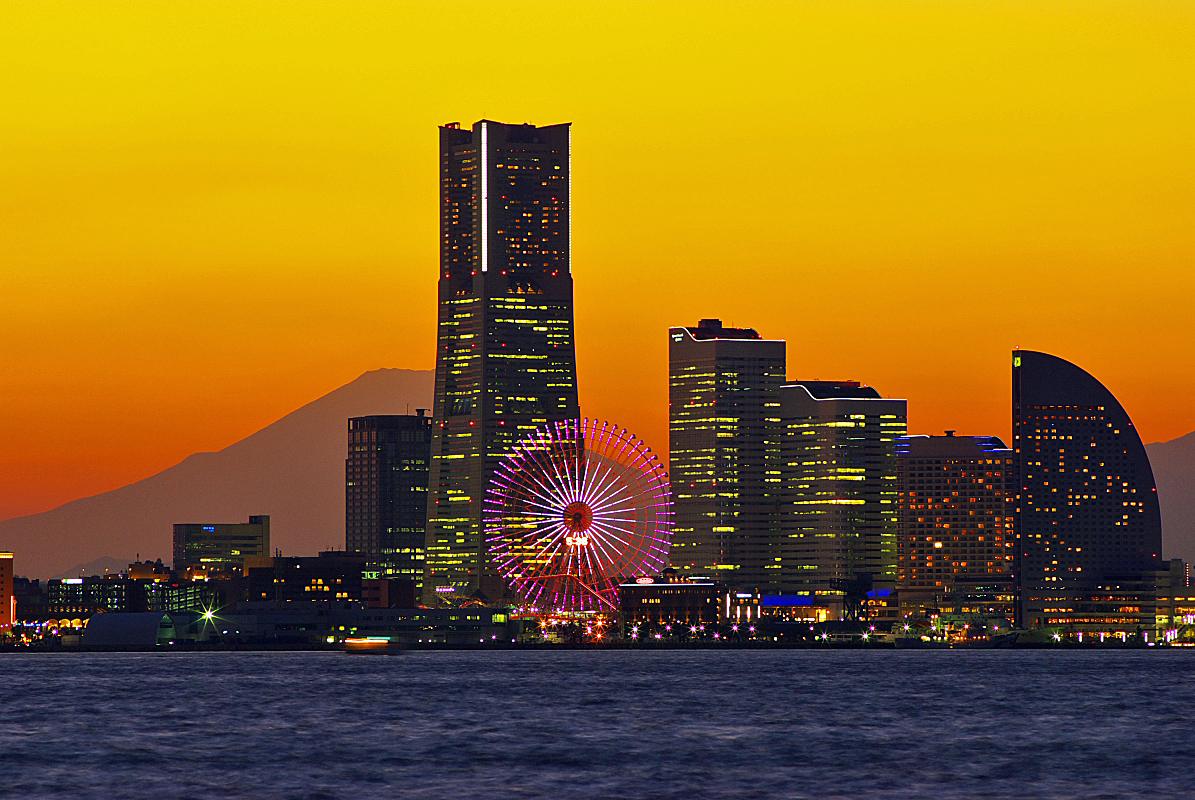
Minato Mirai 21 commercial area is located between Nishi and Naka districts, Yokohama city, Kanagawa prefecture at sunset. Mount Fuji appears on the horizon.

Kanagawa is a relatively small prefecture located at the southeastern corner of the Kantō Plain wedged between Tokyo on the north, the foothills of Mount Fuji on the northwest, and the Sagami Bay and Tokyo Bay on the south and east. The eastern side of the prefecture is relatively flat and heavily urbanized, including the large port cities of Yokohama and Kawasaki.

The southeastern area nearby the Miura Peninsula is less urbanized, with the ancient city of Kamakura drawing tourists to temples and shrines. The western part, bordered by Yamanashi Prefecture and Shizuoka Prefecture on the west, is more mountainous and includes resort areas like Odawara and Hakone. The area, stretching 80 kilometres (50 mi) from west to east and 60 kilometres (37 mi) from north to south, contains 2,400 square kilometres (930 sq mi) of land, accounting for 0.64% of the total land area of Japan.

As of 1 April 2012, 23% of the total land area of the prefecture was designated as Natural Parks, namely the Fuji-Hakone-Izu National Park; Tanzawa-Ōyama Quasi-National Park; and Jinba Sagamiko, Manazuru Hantō, Okuyugawara, and Tanzawa-Ōyama Prefectural Natural Parks.

=== Topography ===
Topographically, the prefecture consists of three distinct areas. The mountainous western region features the Tanzawa Mountain Range and the volcano Mount Hakone. The hilly eastern region is characterized by the Tama Hills and Miura Peninsula. The central region, which surrounds the Tama Hills and Miura Peninsula, consists of flat stream terraces and low lands around major rivers including the Sagami River, Sakai River, Tsurumi River, and Tama River.

The Tama River forms much of the boundary between Kanagawa and Tokyo. The Sagami River flows through the middle of the prefecture. In the western region, the Sakawa runs through a small lowland, the Sakawa Lowland, between Mount Hakone to the west and the Ōiso Hills to the east, and flows into Sagami Bay.

The Tanzawa Mountain Range, part of the Kantō Mountain Range, contains Mount Hiru (1,673 m or 5,489 ft), the highest peak in the prefecture. Other mountains measure similar mid-range heights: Mount Hinokiboramaru (1,601 m or 5,253 ft), Mount Tanzawa, (1,567 m or 5,141 ft), Mount Ōmuro (1,588 m or 5,210 ft), Mount Himetsugi (1,433 m or 4,701 ft), and Mount Usu (1,460 m or 4,790 ft). The mountain range is lower in height southward leading to Hadano Basin to the Ōiso Hills. At the eastern foothills of the mountain range lies the Isehara Plateau and across the Sagami River the Sagamino plateau.

=== Cities ===
Map of Kanagawa Prefecture Government Ordinance Designated City City Town Village

Nineteen cities are located in Kanagawa Prefecture.

Name		Area (km^{2})	Population	Map
Rōmaji	Kanji	Area (km^{2})	Population	Map
Atsugi	厚木市	93.83	223,960	
Ayase	綾瀬市	22.28	83,709	
Chigasaki	茅ヶ崎市	35.71	242,798	
Ebina	海老名市	26.59	141,276	
Fujisawa	藤沢市	69.57	439,728	
Hadano	秦野市	103.76	163,787	
Hiratsuka	平塚市	67.88	257,316	
Isehara	伊勢原市	55.56	101,415	
Kamakura	鎌倉市	39.67	172,929	
Kawasaki	川崎市	143.01	1,538,262	
Minamiashigara	南足柄市	77.12	40,947	
Miura	三浦市	32.05	44,132	
Odawara	小田原市	113.79	185,027	
Sagamihara	相模原市	328.91	723,470	
Yamato	大和市	27.09	244,113	
Yokohama (capital)	横浜市	437.38	3,769,595	
Yokosuka	横須賀市	100.81	373,797	
Zama	座間市	17.58	130,667	
Zushi	逗子市	17.34	58,087	

=== Towns and villages ===
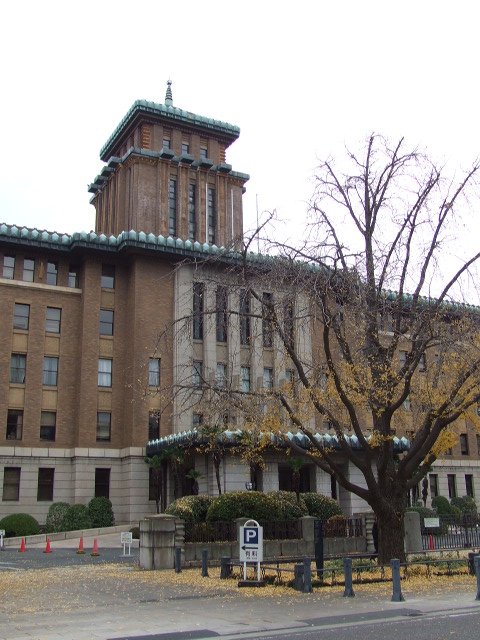
Prefectural office of Kanagawa

These are the towns and villages in each district:

Name		Area (km^{2})	Population	District	Map
Rōmaji	Kanji	Area (km^{2})	Population	District	Map
Aikawa	愛川町	34.29	39,763	Aikō District	
Hakone	箱根町	92.82	10,837	Ashigarashimo District	
Hayama	葉山町	17.06	32,961	Miura District	
Kaisei	開成町	6.56	18,335	Ashigarakami District	
Kiyokawa	清川村	71.29	2,858	Aikō District	
Manazuru	真鶴町	7.02	7,061	Ashigarashimo District	
Matsuda	松田町	37.75	10,514	Ashigarakami District	
Nakai	中井町	20.02	9,155	Ashigarakami District	
Ninomiya	二宮町	9.08	27,334	Naka District	
Ōi	大井町	14.41	17,146	Ashigarakami District	
Ōiso	大磯町	17.18	31,262	Naka District	
Samukawa	寒川町	13.42	48,679	Kōza District	
Yamakita	山北町	224.70	9,878	Ashigarakami District	
Yugawara	湯河原町	40.99	23,267	Ashigarashimo District	

== Demographics ==
Kanagawa prefecture population pyramid in 2020

Historical population
Year	Pop.	±% p.a.
1890	979,756	—
1903	1,051,433	+0.54%
1913	1,228,254	+1.57%
1920	1,323,390	+1.07%
1925	1,416,792	+1.37%
1930	1,619,606	+2.71%
1935	1,840,005	+2.58%
1940	2,188,974	+3.53%
1945	1,865,667	−3.15%
1950	2,487,665	+5.92%
1955	2,919,497	+3.25%
1960	3,443,176	+3.35%
1965	4,430,743	+5.17%
1970	5,472,247	+4.31%
1975	6,397,748	+3.17%
1980	6,924,348	+1.59%
1985	7,431,974	+1.43%
1990	7,980,391	+1.43%
1995	8,245,900	+0.66%
2000	8,489,974	+0.59%
2005	8,791,597	+0.70%
2010	9,048,331	+0.58%
2015	9,058,094	+0.02%

In 1945, Kanagawa was the 15th most populous prefecture in Japan, with a population of about 1.9 million. In the years after the war, the prefecture underwent rapid urbanization as a part of the Greater Tokyo Area. The population as of September 1, 2014 is estimated to be 9.1 million. Kanagawa became the second most populous prefecture in 2006.

== Festivals and events ==
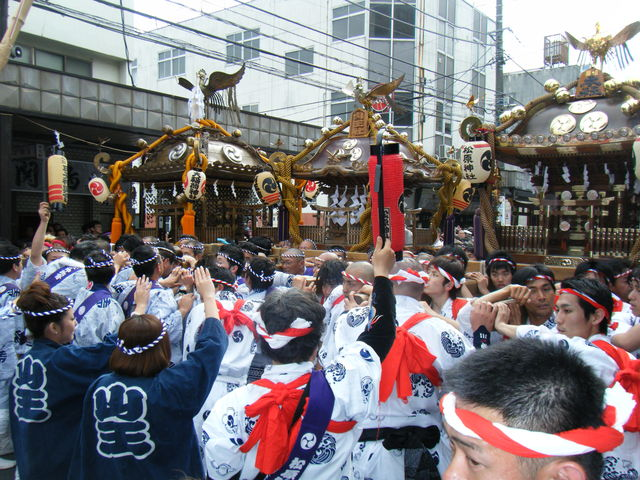
Odawara Hōjō Godai Festival

- Chigasaki Hamaori Festival (July)
- Hiratsuka Tanabata Festival (July)
- Kamakura Festival (April)
- Odawara Hōjō Godai Festival (May)
- Tama River Firework event
- Yokohama Port Anniversary Festival (June)
- Yugawara Kifune Festival (July)

== Transportation ==
Kanagawa's transport network is heavily intertwined with that of Tokyo (see: Transportation in Greater Tokyo). Shin-Yokohama and Odawara stations on the Tōkaidō Shinkansen are located in the prefecture, providing high-speed rail service to Tokyo, Nagoya, Osaka, and other major cities.

=== Railways ===
- East Japan Railway Company
  - Tōkaidō Main Line
  - Nambu Line
  - Tsurumi Line
  - Yokohama Line
  - Negishi Line
  - Yokosuka Line
  - Sagami Line
  - Chūō Main Line
- Central Japan Railway Company
  - Tokaido Shinkansen
  - Gotemba Line
- Keikyu
  - Main Line
  - Daishi Line
  - Kurihama Line
  - Zushi Line
- Odakyu
  - Odawara Line
  - Enoshima Line
  - Tama Line
- Sagami Railway
  - Main Line
  - Izumino Line
  - Shin-Yokohama Line
- Tokyu
  - Tōyoko Line
  - Den-en-toshi Line
  - Ōimachi Line
  - Meguro Line
- Minatomirai Line
- Keio
  - Sagamihara Line
- Izuhakone Railway
  - Daiyūzan Line
- Enoshima Electric Railway

=== Subways ===
- Yokohama Municipal Subway
  - Blue Line
  - Green Line

=== Monorail ===
- Shonan Monorail

=== People movers ===
- Kanazawa Seaside Line

=== Road ===
==== Expressway ====
- Chūō Expressway
- Shuto Expressway
- Tōmei Expressway
- Tokyo Bay Aqua-Line

==== National highways ====
- Route 1
- Route 15
- Route 16
- Route 20
- Route 129 (Hiratsuka-Atsugi-Sagamihara)
- Route 132
- Route 133
- Route 134
- Route 135 (Shimoda–Atami-Odawara)
- Route 138
- Route 246 (Chiyoda, Tokyo-Kawasaki-Machida-Atsugi-Isehara-Gotenba–Numazu)
- Route 255
- Route 357 (Chiba–Funabashi–Daiba of Tokyo-Yokohama-Yokosuka)
- Route 409
- Route 412
- Route 413 (Fujiyoshida–Lake Yamanaka-Sagamihara)
- Route 466 (Setagaya, Tokyo-Kawasaki-Yokohama)
- Route 467

=== Ports ===
- Misaki Port—Ferry Route to Kisarazu
- Port of Yokohama—International container hub port

== Education ==
The Kanagawa Prefectural Board of Education manages and oversees individual municipal school districts. The board of education also directly operates most of the public high schools in the prefecture.

=== University facilities ===
- Kawasaki
  - Keio University—Shin Kawasaki Campus
  - Meiji University—Ikuta Campus
  - Senshu University—Ikuta Campus
  - Japan Women's University
  - Showa University of Music
  - Den-en Chofu University—Aso Ward
  - Nippon Medical School
  - St. Marianna University, School of Medicine—Miyamae
  - Japan Cinema School
  - Tokyo City University—Aso Ward
- Yokohama
  - Tokyo Institute of Technology—Suzukakedai
  - Tokyo University of the Arts—Naka Ward
  - Yokohama National University—Hodogaya
  - Yokohama City University—Kanazawa Ward
  - Kanagawa University—Kanagawa Ward
  - Kanto Gakuin University—Kanazawa Ward
  - Toin University of Yokohama—Aoba Ward
  - Tsurumi University—Tsurumi Ward
  - Yokohama College of Commerce—Tsurumi Ward
  - Yokohama College of Pharmacy—Totsuka Ward
  - Keio University—Hiyoshi Campus
  - Tokyo City University—Tsuzuki Ward
  - Meiji Gakuin University—Totsuka Ward
  - Nippon Sport Science University—Aoba Ward
  - Toyo Eiwa University—Midori Ward
  - Kokugakuin University—Tama Plaza
  - Senzoku Gakuen College of Music
- Sagamihara
  - Aoyama Gakuin University
  - Azabu University
  - Kitasato University
  - Sagami Women's University
  - Obirin University
  - Joshi University of Art and Design
  - Teikyo University
- Yokosuka
  - Kanagawa Dental College
  - Kanagawa University of Human Services
- Hiratsuka
  - Tokai University—Hiratsuka Campus
  - Shoin University—Hiratsuka Campus
  - Kanagawa University
- Isehara
  - Tokai University—Isehara Campus
  - Sanno University
- Odawara
  - Kanto Gakuin University—Odawara Campus
  - International University of Health and Welfare
- Chigasaki
  - Bunkyo University—Chigasaki Campus
- Atsugi
  - Shoin University
  - Tokyo University of Agriculture—Atsugi Campus
  - Kanagawa Institute of Technology
  - Tokyo Polytechnic University—Atsugi Campus
- Hayama
  - Graduate University for Advanced Studies

== Sports ==
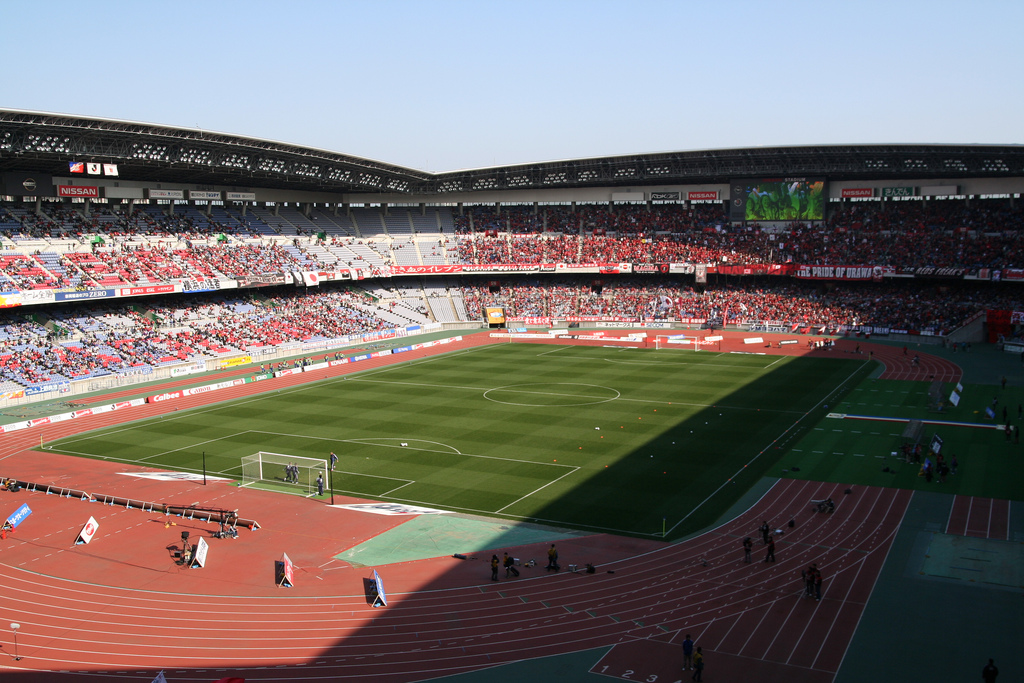
Nissan Stadium in Yokohama

=== Facilities ===
==== Football and athletics ====
- Hiratsuka Athletics Stadium
- Nippatsu Mitsuzawa Stadium (Mitsuzawa Stadium)—in Yokohama, only for football
- Nissan Stadium (International Stadium Yokohama)—in Yokohama, the final venue of 2002 FIFA World Cup, FIFA Club World Cup in 2005–2007 and 2019 Rugby World Cup
- Sagamihara Gion Stadium
- Todoroki Athletics Stadium—in Kawasaki, the final venue of 2007 IFAF World Cup (American football).

==== Baseball ====
- Kawasaki Stadium—former homeground of Taiyo Whales (now Yokohama BayStars) and Lotte Orions (now Chiba Lotte Marines).
- Yokohama Stadium—for baseball (Yokohama DeNA BayStars) and hosted Australian rules football
- Yokosuka Stadium—home field of Shonan Searex, minor league team of Yokohama BayStars

==== Indoor ====
- Odawara Arena—2020 Kanagawa Pre-Games training facilities
- Todoroki Arena—in Kawasaki and multi-purpose venue (including basketball)
- Yokohama Arena—also for music concert
- Yokohama Cultural Gymnasium—a volleyball venue of 1964 Summer Olympics in Tokyo

==== Other ====
- Enoshima Yacht Course—used for 1964 Summer Olympics.
- Hakone Ekiden Course—from Tokyo to Hakone, 108.0 km, mostly on Japan National Route 1 and Route 15. Runners run on the divided route for ten parts on January 2 (to Hakone) and January 3 (to Tokyo) every year.
- Lake Sagami—hosted canoeing and rowing for the 1964 Summer Olympics.

=== Teams ===
==== Association football ====
- Kawasaki Frontale (Kawasaki)—Todoroki Athletics
- SC Sagamihara (Sagamihara)—Gion Stadium
- Shonan Bellmare (Hiratsuka, Odawara and some cities and towns in central and western area of Kanagawa)—Hiratsuka Athletic Stadium (football) and Odawara Arena (futsal)
- Yokohama F.C. (Yokohama)—Mitsuzawa Ballpark
- Yokohama F. Marinos (Yokohama, Yokosuka)—Nissan Stadium

==== Baseball ====
- Yokohama BayStars (Yokohama)—Yokohama Stadium, and Yokosuka Stadium (for its farm team, "Shonan Searex").

==== Basketball ====
- Toshiba Brave Thunders Kanagawa (Kawasaki)—Todoroki Arena

==== Volleyball ====
- NEC Red Rockets (Kawasaki)—Todoroki Arena

== Visitor attractions and places of interest ==
- Yokohama Chinatown
- Yokohama Municipal Children's Botanical Garden
- Yokohama War Cemetery

== Notable people ==
- Kaoru Otsuki (born 6 August 1888 – 21 December 1970), was the Japanese second wife of Sun Yat-sen, the founder and first president of the Republic of China.
- Lynn, voice actress
- Ryoko Mima (born 1984), model and entertainer
- Kaede, dancer, singer, model and actress, member of F5ve, formerly a member of E-girls and its subunit Happiness

== International relations ==
Kanagawa Prefecture has sister relationships with these places:

- Maryland, United States (1981)
- Liaoning Province, China (1983)
- Odesa Oblast, Ukraine (1986)
- Baden-Württemberg, Germany (1989)
- (South Korea) Gyeonggi Province, Republic of Korea (1990)
- Queensland, Australia (1990)
- Penang, Malaysia (1991)
- Västra Götaland County, Sweden (1998)
- (Mexico) Aguascalientes, México (2013)

== In popular culture ==
- The Japanese anime and manga series Anonymous Noise takes place in Kanagawa, mostly Kamakura (Kamakura Yuigahama Beach).
- The Japanese anime and manga series Astro Fighter Sunred is set in Kanagawa Prefecture, specifically Kawasaki City and the area around the Tama River.
- The Japanese anime and manga series Bungo Stray Dogs is set in Yokohama.
- The Japanese manga series Elfen Lied takes place in Kanagawa, mainly in Kamakura and Enoshima (Fujisawa).
- The Japanese anime series Gundam Wing's early episodes feature Kanagawa prominently, mainly Yokohama and Yokosuka.
- The Japanese anime and manga series Hamatora takes place in Kanagawa, mainly in Yokohama.
- The Japanese anime and manga series His and Her Circumstances takes place in Kanagawa Prefecture, mainly in Kawasaki city and Yokohama.
- The Japanese anime and manga series Initial D Fifth Stage is set in Kanagawa, and Final Stage is set in Hakone.
- The Japanese manga and anime series Kenkō Zenrakei Suieibu Umishō takes place in the fictional Kanagawa city of Umineko.
- The Japanese anime and manga series The Knight in the Area takes place in Kanagawa, mostly Kamakura.
- It's never been said, but the Japanese manga series Komi Can't Communicate is set in Kanagawa. One of the characters lives in a building complex in the city of Chigasaki that exists in real life.
- A team from the Japanese anime and manga series Kuroko's Basketball, Kaijo, is from Kanagawa.
- The Hinata Inn and surrounding town from the manga and anime series Love Hina are located in Kanagawa.
- The Japanese anime and manga series Neon Genesis Evangelion takes place in Tokyo-3, which is located in the village of Hakone, in the Ashigarashimo District
- Stephen Sondheim's stage musical Pacific Overtures, about the "opening" of Japan to Western influence by Commodore Perry, contains the song "Welcome to Kanagawa".
- The Japanese anime and manga series Rascal Does Not Dream of Bunny Girl Senpai takes place in various places in Kanagawa Prefecture, including Fujisawa and Yokohama.
- The Japanese anime series S-CRY-ED takes place in Kanagawa Prefecture, after a seismic event raises it from the ground.
- The Japanese manga, anime, and live action film series Shonan Bakusozoku takes place in the eponymous area of Kanagawa.
- The manga Shonan Junai Gumi, along with its prequel Bad Company, and the sequel Great Teacher Onizuka's spin-off GTO: 14 Days in Shonan, are set in Shonan, in Kanagawa.
- The main team in the Japanese manga and anime series Slam Dunk, Shohoku, is from Kanagawa.
- The Japanese anime and manga series Sweet Blue Flowers is set in Kamakura.
- The Japanese anime and manga series Yowamushi Pedal, Hakone Academy is from Hakone, Kanagawa.

== See also ==
- Politics of Kanagawa

== General cited references ==
- Hammer, Joshua (2006). Yokohama Burning: The Deadly 1923 Earthquake and Fire that Helped Forge the Path to World War II. New York: Simon & Schuster. ISBN 9780743264655. OCLC 67774380.
- Nussbaum, Louis-Frédéric and Käthe Roth (2005). Japan Encyclopedia. Cambridge: Harvard University Press. ISBN 978-0-674-01753-5. OCLC 58053128.
