= Yokohama War Cemetery =

WWII and Korean War CWGC cemetery in Japan

Coordinates: 35°26′3″N 139°34′51″E

- Commonwealth War Graves Commission
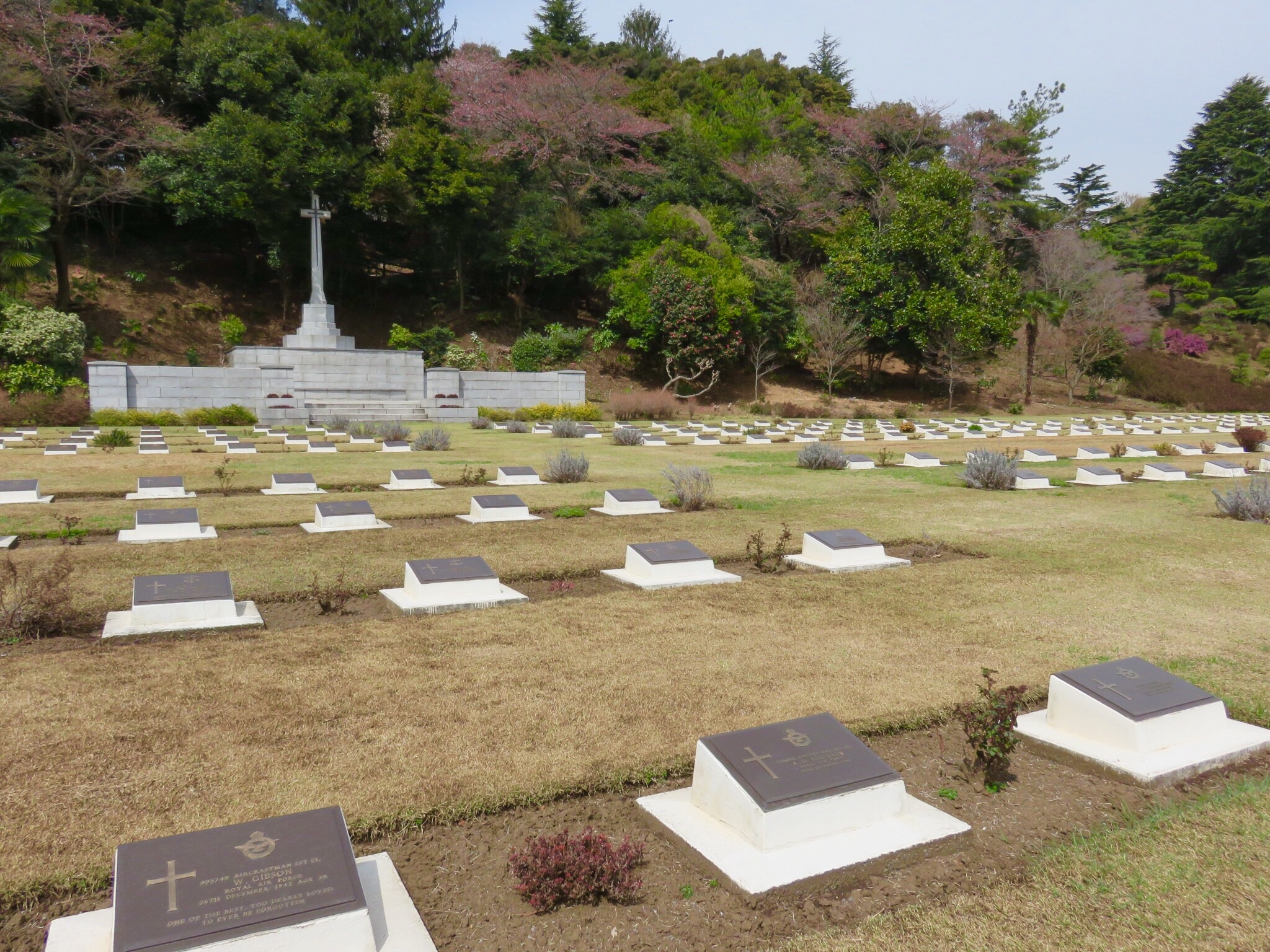
- Yokohama War Cemetery, British Section, March 2015
- Used for those deceased 1941–1945; 1950–1953
- Established: 1945
- Location: near Yokohama, Japan
- Total burials: 1,555
- Unknowns: 53

Burials by war
- Second World War; Korean War

Yokohama War Cemetery is a military cemetery in Hodogaya-ku, Yokohama, Japan. next to Yokohama Municipal Children's Botanical Garden.

The burial grounds consists of four sections surrounded by mature trees in a park like setting:

- British Section
- Canadian and New Zealand Section
- Australian Section
- Indian Section (Yokohama Memorial)

There is a Post-War Plot for those who fought during the Korean War 1950–1953.

== History ==
The cemetery was constructed after the Second World War by the Australian War Graves group, and holds the remains of more than 1500 soldiers, mostly from Australia, Canada, New Zealand, India, and the United Kingdom but also the Netherlands and the United States, who died as prisoners of war or during the Allied occupation of Japan.

A post-war section was added after 1953 to bury 171 soldiers who died fighting in the Korean War The cemetery also contains a number of post-War burials, including that of the Australian Victoria Cross recipient Ray Simpson.

The Yokohama War Cemetery is the only location cared for by the Commonwealth War Graves Commission in Japan, although a memorial to Commonwealth service personnel from the First World War, unveiled in 1922 by Edward, Prince of Wales, is to be found at the historic Foreign General Cemetery in Yamate, Naka-ku, Yokohama.

The cemetery is a venue for annual commemorations by military veterans and their families. The cemetery has also been visited by various members of the British Royal Family including Queen Elizabeth II in May 1975, Princess Diana in February 1995 and by Prince William in February 2015.
