= Sagamino plateau =

The Sagamino plateau (相模野台地, Sagamino daichi), also known as the Zama Hills (座間丘陵, Zama kyūryō) or Sagami plains (相模平野, Sagami heiya), is a wide plateau situated between the Tama Hills and the Sagami River in Kanagawa Prefecture, Japan. Near its northern boundary with the city of Sagamihara, it is also called the Sagamihara plateau (相模原台地, Sagamihara daichi).
