= Tama Hills =

Area of hills on Honshū, Japan

Coordinates: 35°37′N 139°24′E

Tama Hills (多摩丘陵, Tama-kyūryō) is an area of hills stretching across southwest Tokyo and northeast Kanagawa Prefecture in the Kantō Plain on Honshū, Japan. Its total area is approximately 300 km^{2}. The Tama River marks its northeastern boundary. The Tama Hills border the Sagamino plateau.

It straddles the municipalities of Hachiōji, Hino, Tama, Inagi, and Machida cities in Tokyo, and Kawasaki and Yokohama cities in Kanagawa.

The area is dotted with remains of Jōmon period hunter-gatherer settlements.

The area had been developed extensively since the 1950s to support demand for housing around rapidly expanding Tokyo and Yokohama. The hills are now mostly a patchwork of new residential suburbs and low, forested hills and pockets of remaining farmland. Some fairly large areas of forests still exist in places. Most notable among the housing developments are Tama New Town and Kohoku New Town.

The build-up of the area is a key plot element to the Studio Ghibli animated film Pom Poko.

Points of interest in Tama Hills include:

- Tama Zoological Park: one of the main zoos in Japan.
- Zoorasia: a new zoo in Asahi ward, Yokohama.
- Yomiuriland amusement park
- Nihon Minka-en: an architectural museum and collection of 20 traditional Japanese farmhouses from across Japan, located in Tama ward, Kawasaki.
