= Kami-kitazawa Station =

Railway station in Tokyo, Japan

Coordinates: 35.6687°N 139.6232°E

Kami-Kitazawa Station 上北沢駅

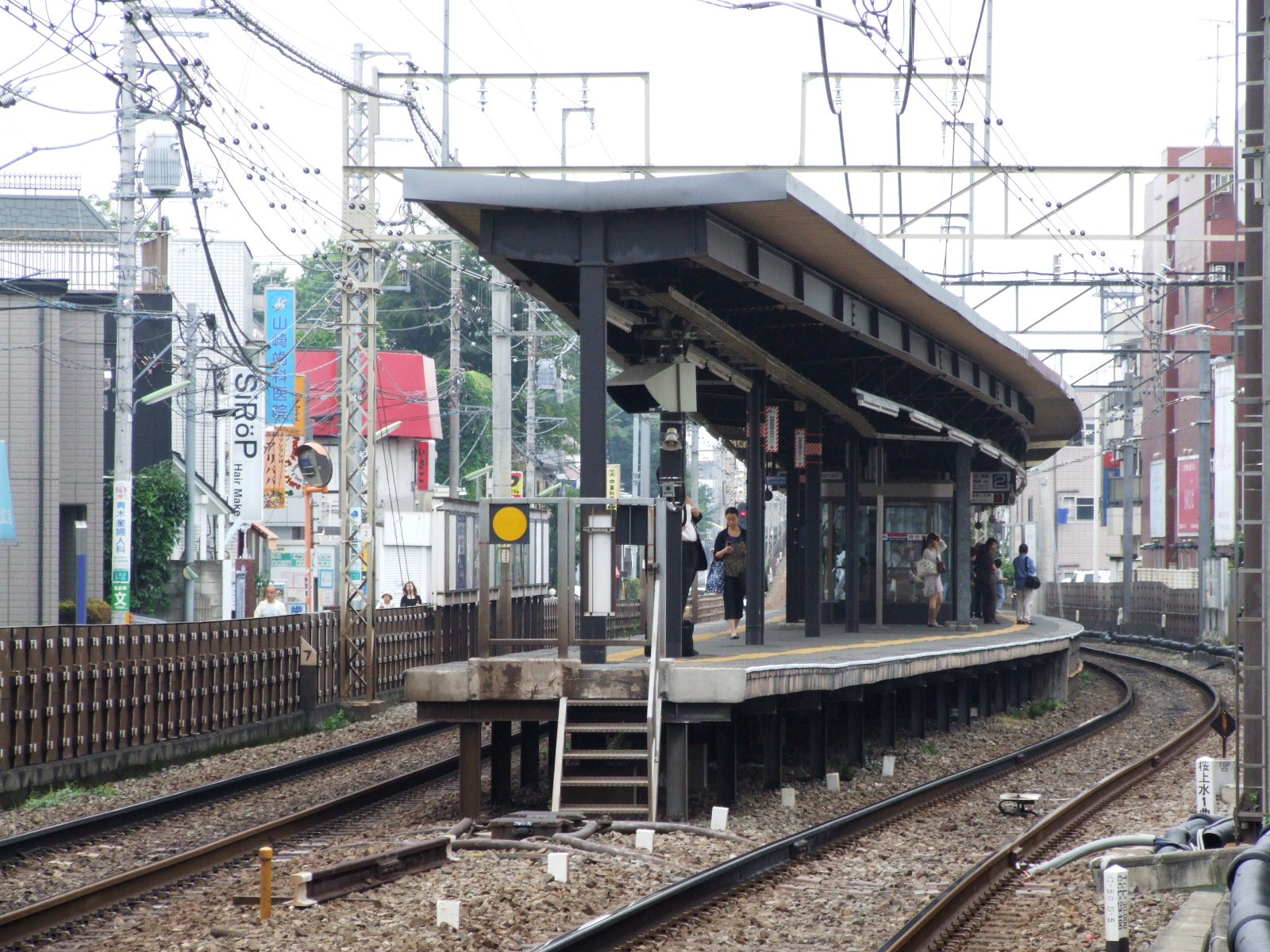
- Platform

General information
- Location: 4-14-3 KamiKitazawa, Setagaya, Tokyo; Japan
- Operator: Keio Corporation
- Line: Keiō Line
- Connections: Bus stop

Other information
- Station code: KO09

History
- Opened: 15 April 1913; 113 years ago
- Former names: Kami-Kitazawa (until 1917), Kitazawa (until 1932)

Passengers
- FY2016: 15,165 daily

Services
Preceding station	Keio Corporation	Following station
Hachimanyama towards Keiō-hachiōji	Keiō Line Local	Sakurajōsui towards Shinjuku
Location
- Location within Special wards of Tokyo Location within Japan

Kami-Kitazawa Station (上北沢駅, Kamikitazawa-eki) is a railway station on the Keiō Line in Setagaya, Tokyo, Japan, operated by the private railway operator Keio Corporation.

== Station layout ==
=== Platforms ===
1	Keiō Line	for Chōfu and Keiō-Hachiōji; Keiō Sagamihara Line for Hashimoto (via Chōfu); Keiō Takao Line for Takaosanguchi (via Kitano)
2	Keiō Line	for Meidaimae, Sasazuka, and Shinjuku; Keiō New Line for Shinjuku; Toei Shinjuku Line for Moto-Yawata

== History ==
Kami-Kitazawa Station opened on 15 April 1913.
