= Chitose-karasuyama Station =

Railway station in Tokyo, Japan

Coordinates: 35.6679°N 139.6006°E

Chitose-karasuyama Station 千歳烏山駅

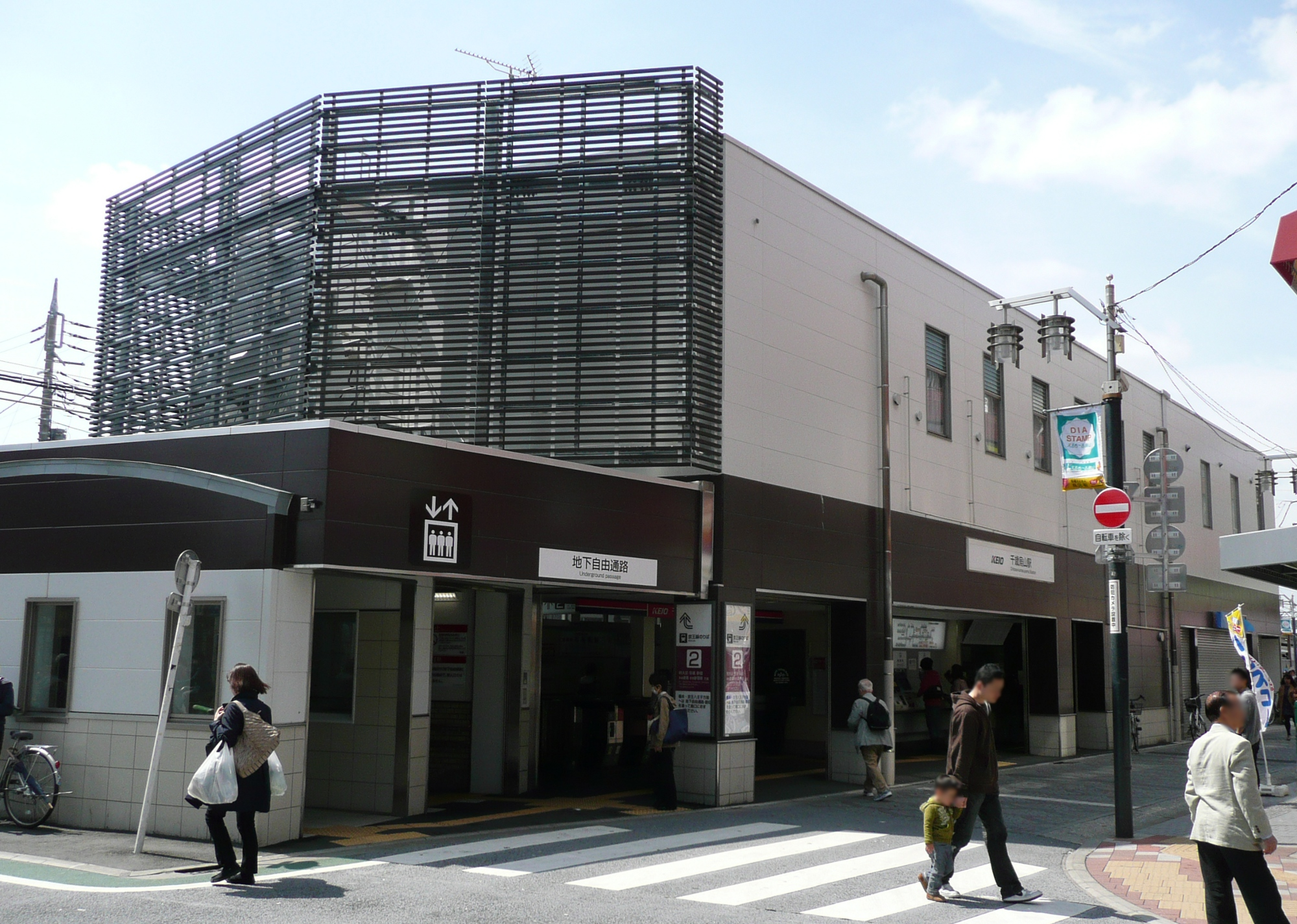

General information
- Location: 6-1-1 Minami-Karasuyama, Setagaya, Tokyo; Japan
- Operator: Keio Corporation
- Line: Keio Line
- Connections: Bus stop

Other information
- Station code: KO12

History
- Opened: April 15, 1913; 113 years ago
- Former names: Karasuyama (until 1929)

Passengers
- FY2011: 74,518 daily

Services
Preceding station	Keio Corporation	Following station
Chōfu towards Keiō-hachiōji	Keiō Line Special Express	Meidaimae towards Shinjuku
Tsutsujigaoka towards Keiō-hachiōji	Keiō Line Express	Sakurajōsui towards Shinjuku
Sengawa towards Keiō-hachiōji	Keiō Line Semi Express	Sakurajōsui towards Shinjuku
Sengawa towards Keiō-hachiōji	Keiō Line Rapid	Hachimanyama towards Shinjuku
Sengawa towards Keiō-hachiōji	Keiō Line Local	Roka-kōen towards Shinjuku
Location
- Location within Special wards of Tokyo Location within Japan

Chitose-karasuyama Station (千歳烏山駅, Chitose-karasuyama-eki) is a railway station on the Keio Line in Setagaya, Tokyo, Japan, operated by the private railway operator Keio Corporation. It is the westernmost station of the Keio Line in the 23 special wards of Tokyo. Trains cross the Setagaya-Chōfu border west of the station in Kyuden, Setagaya.

== Station layout ==
The station has two ground-level side platforms serving two tracks. Both platforms are connected by stairs to two underground concourses beneath the tracks.

=== Platforms ===
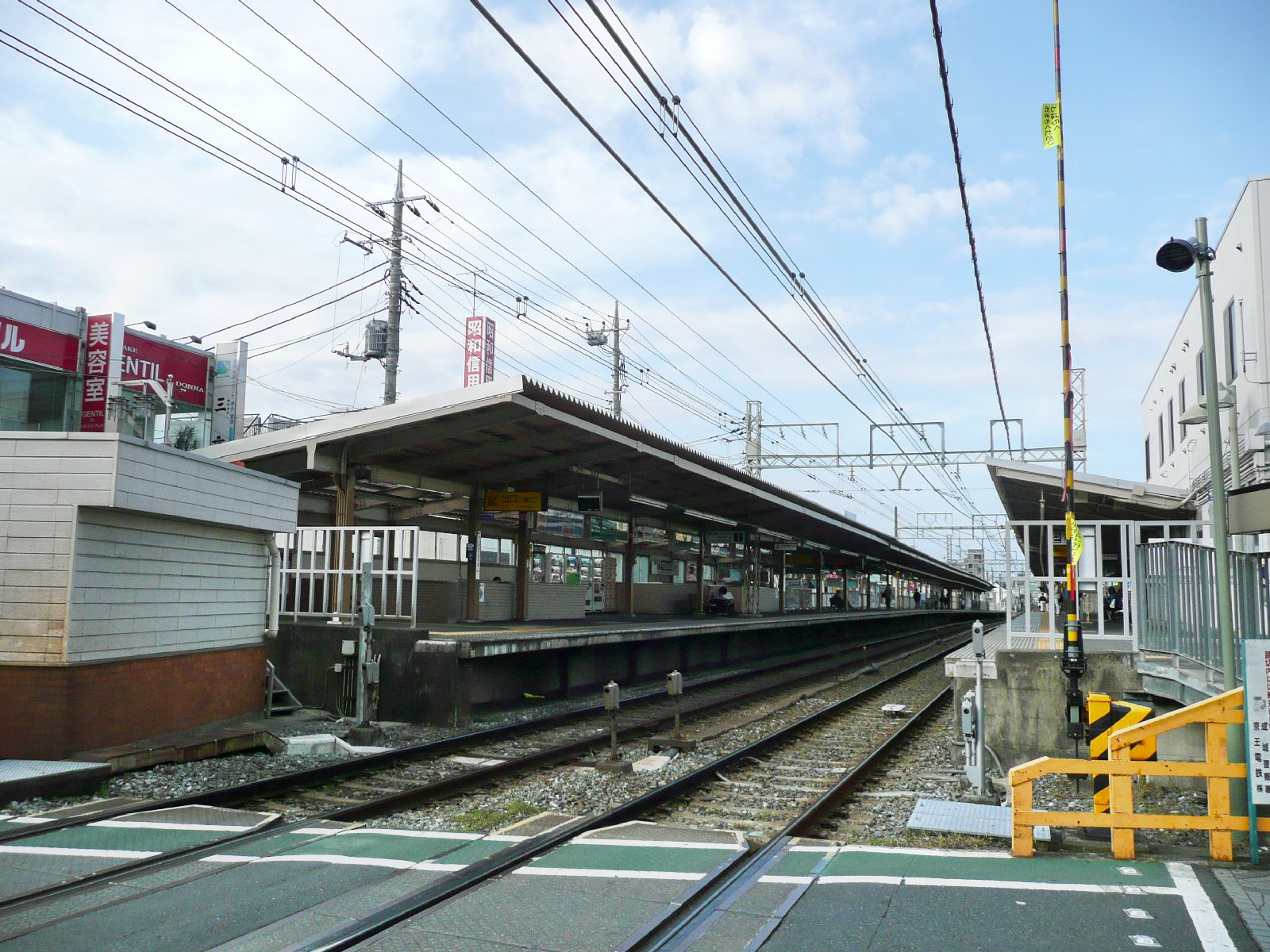
View of the platforms from the adjacent level crossing, October 2008

1	Keiō Line	for Chōfu and Keiō-Hachiōji; Keiō Sagamihara Line for Hashimoto (via Chōfu); Keiō Takao Line for Takaosanguchi (via Kitano)
2	Keiō Line	for Meidaimae, Sasazuka, and Shinjuku; Keiō New Line for Shinjuku; Toei Shinjuku Line for Moto-Yawata

== History ==
The station opened on April 15, 1913 as Karasuyama Station (烏山駅). It was renamed Chitose-karasuyama on 7 August 1929.

== Passenger statistics ==
In fiscal 2023, the station was used by an average of 77,686 passengers daily.

== Surrounding area ==
On both the north and south sides of the station lie large shopping streets. Just north of the station is the Karasuyama District Administration Office. There are plans to redevelop this area.
