= Sakurajōsui Station =

Railway station in Tokyo, Japan

Coordinates: 35°40′3.63″N 139°37′54.73″E

Sakurajōsui Station 桜上水駅

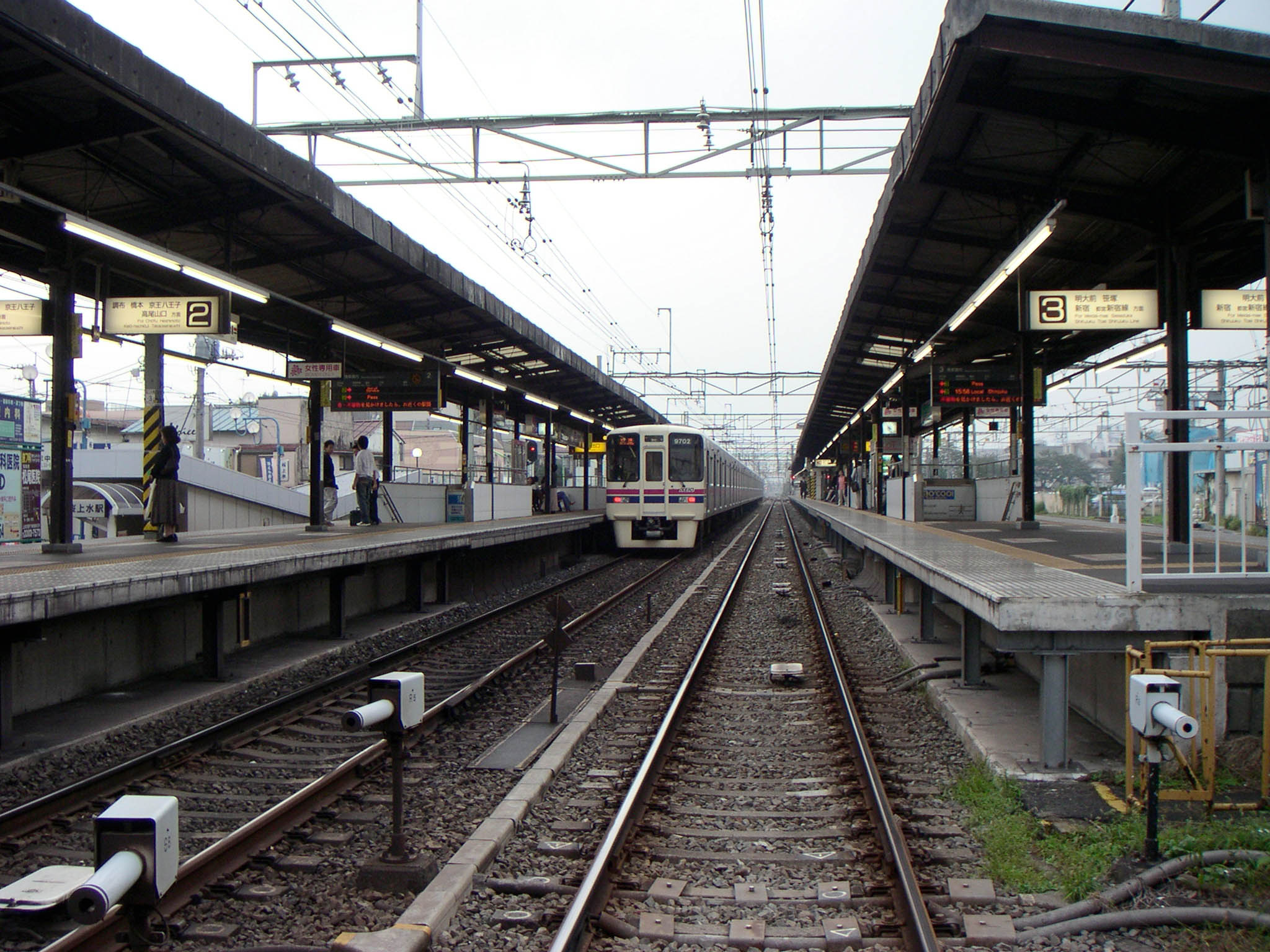
- Sakurajōsui Station

General information
- Location: 5-29-52 Sakurajosui, Setagaya, Tokyo; Japan
- Operator: Keio Corporation
- Line: Keio Line
- Connections: Bus stop

Other information
- Station code: KO08

History
- Opened: 25 April 1926; 100 years ago
- Former names: Kitazawa-shakomae (until 1933), Keiō-shakomae (until 1937)

Passengers
- FY2016: 38,953 daily

Services
Preceding station	Keio Corporation	Following station
Chitose-karasuyama towards Keiō-hachiōji	Keiō Line Express Semi Express	Meidaimae towards Shinjuku
Hachimanyama towards Keiō-hachiōji	Keiō Line Rapid	Shimo-takaido towards Shinjuku
Kami-kitazawa towards Keiō-hachiōji	Keiō Line Local	Shimo-takaido towards Shinjuku
Location
- Location within Special wards of Tokyo Location within Japan

Sakurajōsui Station (桜上水駅, Sakurajōsui-eki) is a railway station on the Keio Line in Setagaya, Tokyo, Japan, operated by the private railway operator Keio Corporation.

== Station layout ==
The station consists of two ground-level island platforms serving four tracks.

=== Platforms ===
1, 2	Keiō Line	for Chōfu and Keiō-Hachiōji; Keiō Sagamihara Line for Hashimoto (via Chōfu); Keiō Takao Line for Takaosanguchi (via Kitano)
3, 4	Keiō Line	for Meidaimae, Sasazuka, and Shinjuku; Keiō New Line for Shinjuku; Toei Shinjuku Line for Moto-Yawata

== History ==
Sakurajōsui Station opened on 25 April 1926.
