= Roka-kōen Station =

Railway station in Tokyo, Japan

Coordinates: 35.6704°N 139.6081°E

Roka-kōen Station 芦花公園駅

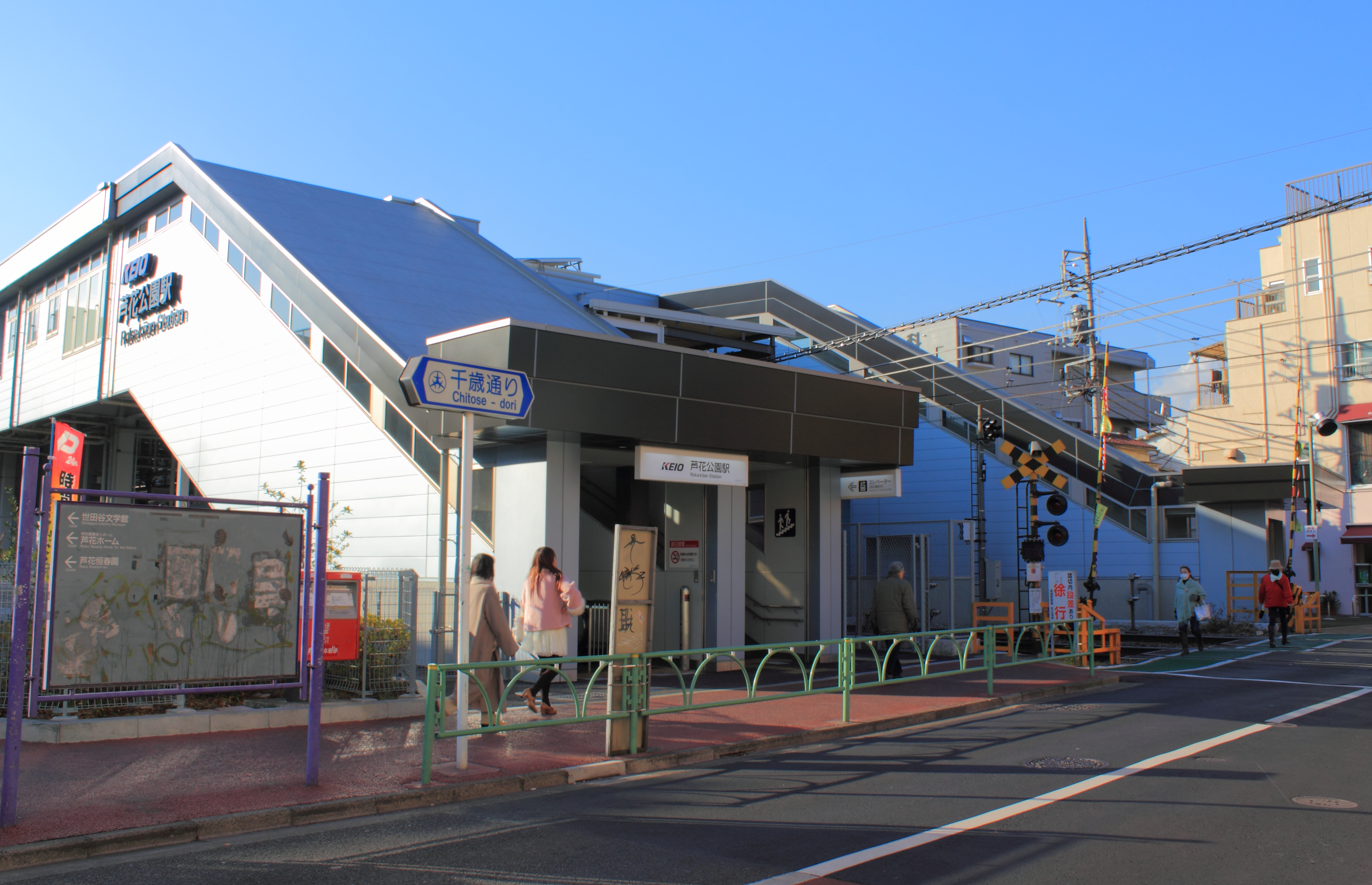
- Roka-kōen station. January 2012

General information
- Location: 3-1-16 Minami-Karasuyama, Setagaya, Tokyo; Japan
- Operator: Keio Corporation
- Line: Keio Line
- Connections: Bus stop

Other information
- Station code: KO11

History
- Opened: April 15, 1913; 113 years ago
- Former names: Kami-Takaido (until 1937)

Passengers
- FY2016: 14,429 daily

Services
Preceding station	Keio Corporation	Following station
Chitose-karasuyama towards Keiō-hachiōji	Keiō Line Local	Hachimanyama towards Shinjuku
Location
- Location within Special wards of Tokyo Location within Japan

Roka-kōen Station (芦花公園駅, Roka-kōen-eki) is a railway station on the Keio Line in Setagaya, Tokyo, Japan, operated by the private railway operator Keio Corporation.

The station is named after the nearby Roka Kōshun-en, a park to commemorate Japanese novelist Roka Tokutomi (1868-1927). The park is located approximately one kilometer south of the station. Despite the name, Hachimanyama Station is marginally closer to the park itself.

== Station layout ==
This station has two ground-level side platforms serving two tracks.

=== Platforms ===
1	Keiō Line	for Chōfu and Keiō-Hachiōji; Keiō Sagamihara Line for Hashimoto (via Chōfu); Keiō Takao Line for Takaosanguchi (via Kitano)
2	Keiō Line	for Meidaimae, Sasazuka, and Shinjuku; Keiō New Line for Shinjuku; Toei Shinjuku Line for Moto-Yawata

== History ==
The station opened on April 15, 1913, initially named Kami-Takaido Station (上高井戸駅). It was renamed on September 1, 1937.
