= Hachimanyama Station =

Railway station in Tokyo, Japan

Coordinates: 35.6699°N 139.6151°E

Hachimanyama Station 八幡山駅

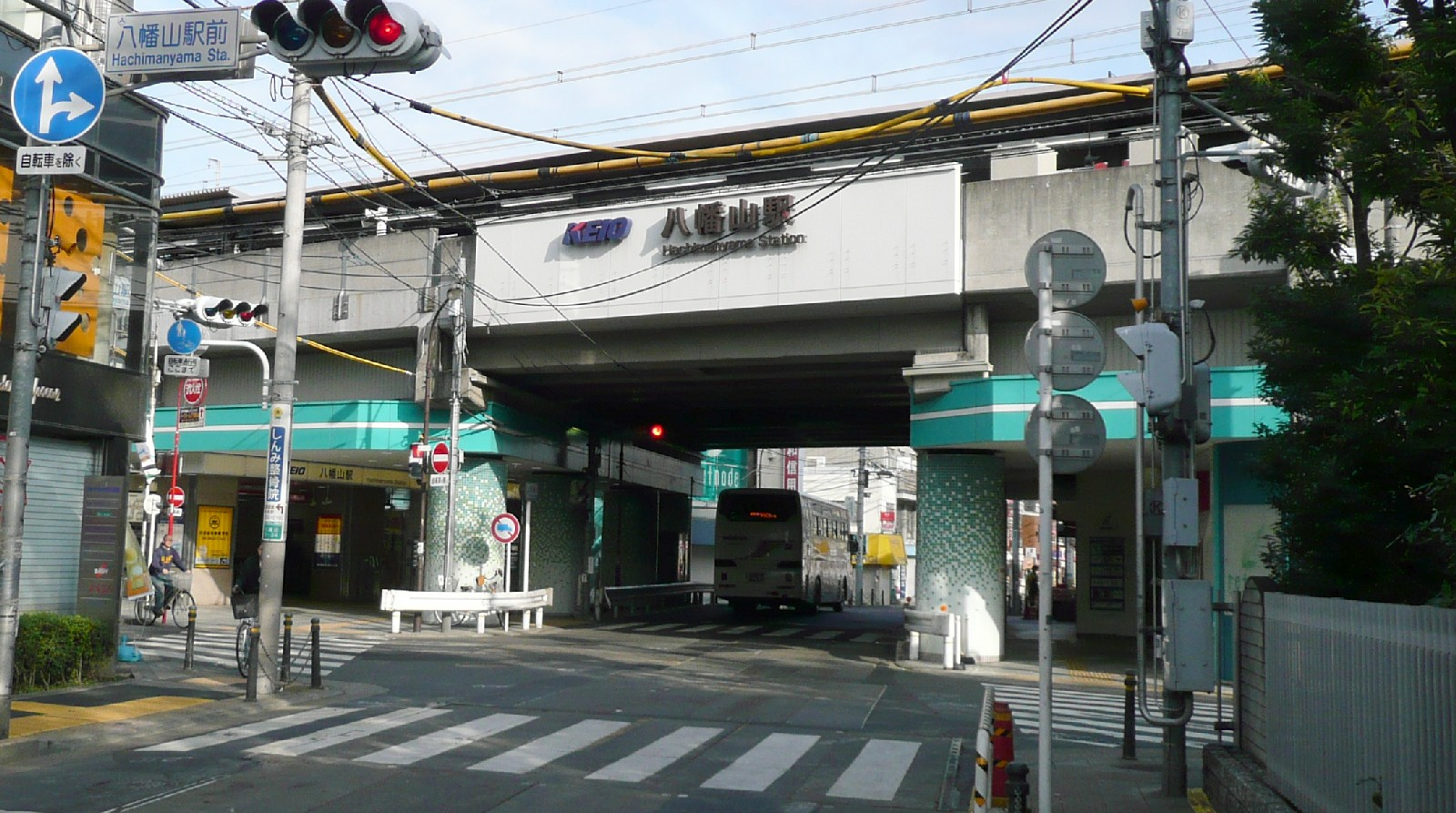
- South side of elevated station

General information
- Location: 1-1-11 Kami-Takaido, Suginami, Tokyo; Japan
- Operator: Keio Corporation
- Line: Keiō Line
- Connections: Bus stop

Other information
- Station code: KO10

History
- Opened: 1 May 1918; 108 years ago
- Former names: Matsuzawa (until 1937)

Passengers
- FY2016: 42,570 daily

Services
Preceding station	Keio Corporation	Following station
Chitose-karasuyama towards Keiō-hachiōji	Keiō Line Rapid	Sakurajōsui towards Shinjuku
Roka-koen towards Keiō-hachiōji	Keiō Line Local	Kami-kitazawa towards Shinjuku
Location
- Location within Special wards of Tokyo Location within Japan

Hachimanyama Station (八幡山駅, Hachiman'yama-eki) is a railway station on the Keiō Line in Suginami, Tokyo, Japan, operated by the private railway operator Keio Corporation.

== Station ==
The station consists of a single elevated island platform serving two tracks. There are also two outer tracks used by passing trains.

=== Platforms ===
1	Keiō Line	for Chōfu and Keiō-Hachiōji; Keiō Sagamihara Line for Hashimoto (via Chōfu); Keiō Takao Line for Takaosanguchi (via Kitano)
2	Keiō Line	for Meidaimae, Sasazuka, and Shinjuku; Keiō New Line for Shinjuku; Toei Shinjuku Line for Moto-Yawata

== History ==
Hachimanyama Station opened on 1 May 1918.

== See also ==
- List of railway stations in Japan
