= Hatsudai Station =

Railway station in Tokyo, Japan

Hatsudai Station 初台駅

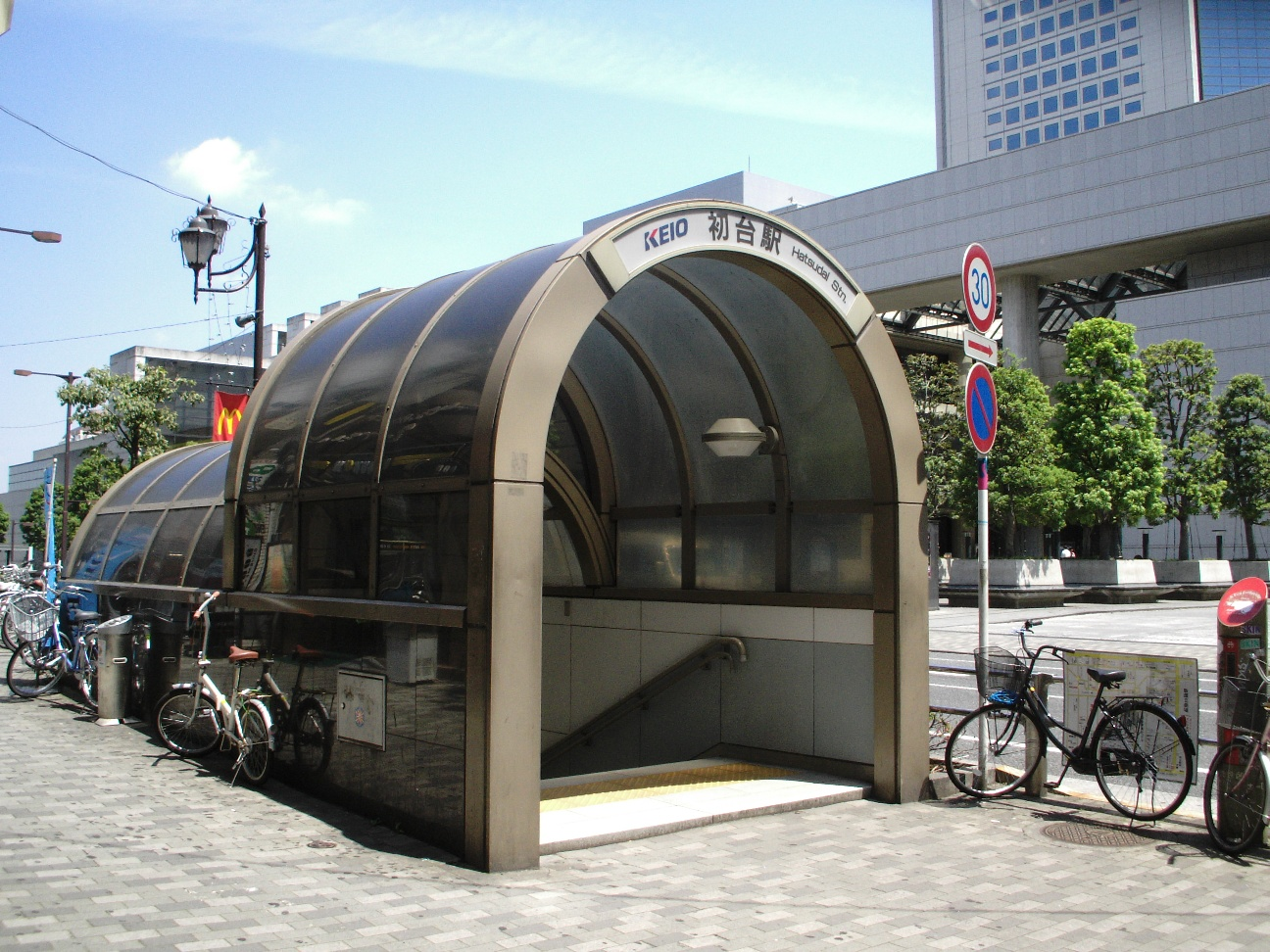
- Station entrance in 2007

General information
- Location: Shibuya, Tokyo; Japan
- Coordinates: 35°40′52″N 139°41′11″E
- Operator: Keio Corporation
- Line: Keio New Line

History
- Opened: 1914

Services
Preceding station	Keio Corporation	Following station
Hatagaya towards Sasazuka	Keiō New Line Express Semi Express Rapid Local	Shinjuku Terminus
Location

Hatsudai Station (初台駅, Hatsudai-eki) is a railway station on the Keio New Line in Shibuya, Tokyo, Japan, operated by the private railway operator Keio Corporation.

== Station layout ==
1	■ Keio New Line	for Sasazuka; Keio Line for Meidaimae, Chōfu, and Hashimoto
2	■ Keio New Line	for Shinjuku; Toei Shinjuku Line for Ichigaya, Ōjima, and Motoyawata

== History ==
Hatsudai Station opened on 11 June 1914.

== Surrounding area ==
Hatsudai is the closest station to Opera City Tower and the New National Theatre, Tokyo. The area is served by several bus lines as well, in particular along Opera Dori and Shin Kokuritsu Gekijo-mae at the Central and South Exits.

The area around Hatsudai Station is home to corporations such as Lotte, Casio and NTT East, as well as to the Kanto International Senior High School.
