= Toei 10-300 series =

Japanese train type

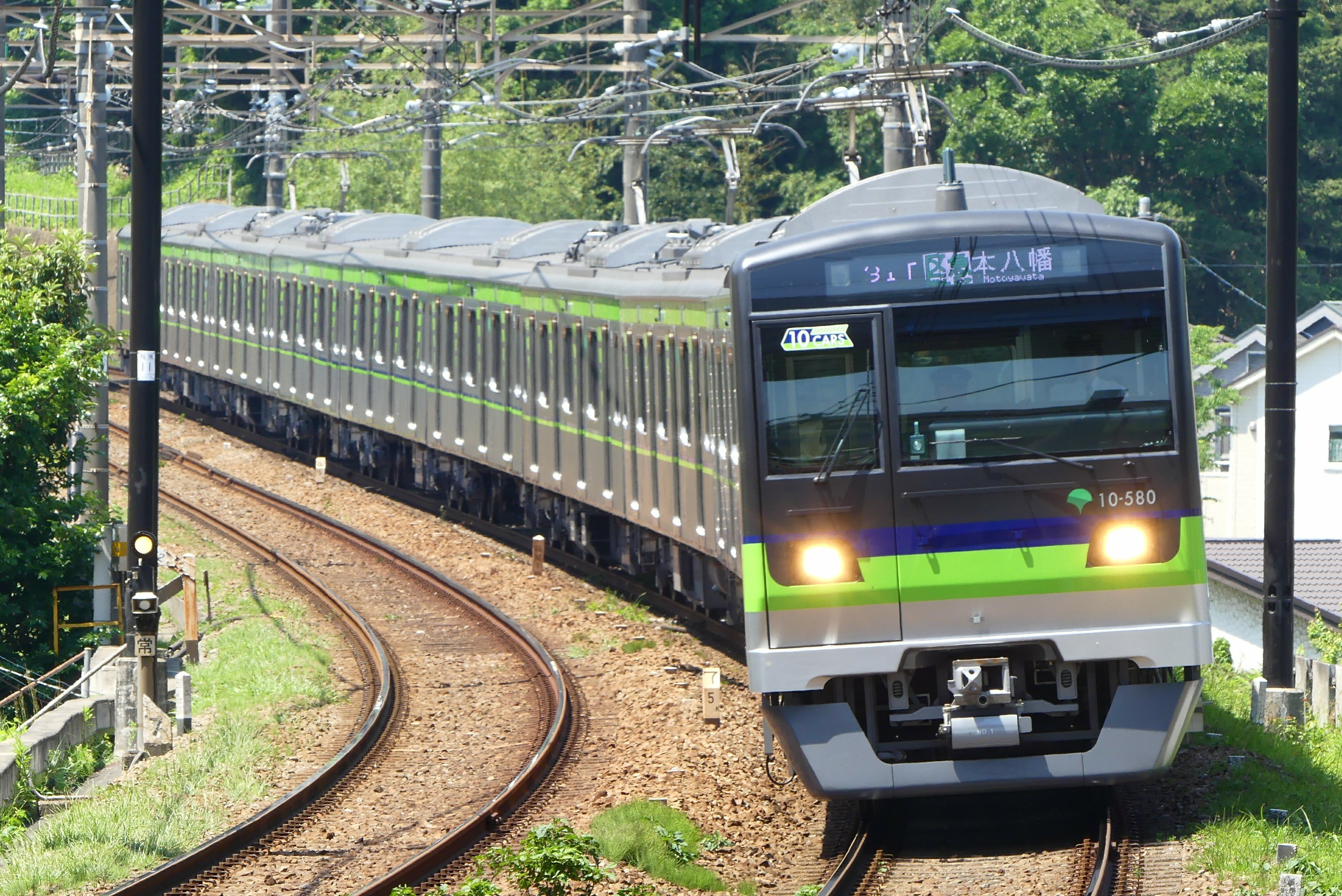
- A Toei Shinjuku Line 10-300 series train
- In service: 2005 – Present (10-300 series); 2005 – 2017 (10-300R series)
- Manufacturers: JR East Niitsu, J-TREC, Tokyu Car
- Replaced: Toei 10-000 series
- Constructed: 2004–
- Entered service: 21 May 2005
- Number under construction: At least 82 vehicles (8 sets + at least 2 cars to lengthen 8-car sets)
- Number built: 242 vehicles (27 sets)
- Number in service: 210 vehicles (23 sets)
- Number scrapped: 32 vehicles (4 sets)
- Formation: 8/10 cars per set
- Fleet numbers: 10–310
- Operator: Toei Subway
- Depot: Oshima
- Lines served: Toei Shinjuku Line; Keio New Line; Keiō Line; Keio Sagamihara Line; Keio Takao Line; Keio Dobutsuen Line

Specifications
- Car body construction: Stainless steel
- Car length: 20.15 m (66 ft 1 in) (end cars); 20 m (65 ft 7 in) (intermediate cars)
- Width: 2,770 mm (9 ft 1 in)
- Height: 3,640 mm (11 ft 11 in)
- Floor height: 1,130 mm (3 ft 8 in)
- Doors: 4 pairs per side
- Maximum speed: 120 km/h (74.6 mph)
- Weight: 23.8–30.1 t (23.4–29.6 long tons; 26.2–33.2 short tons) per car
- Traction system: Variable frequency (IGBT) (10-300 series); Chopper control (10-300R series)
- Power output: 95 kW (127 hp) (10-300 series motor), 165 kW (221 hp) (10-300R series motor)
- Transmission: Twin-disc drive of gear ratio 7.07 (10-300 series), Westinghouse-Natal drive of gear ratio 5.31 (10-300R series)
- Acceleration: 3.3 km/(h⋅s) (2.1 mph/s)
- Deceleration: 4.0 km/(h⋅s) (2.5 mph/s) (service), 4.5 km/(h⋅s) (2.8 mph/s) (emergency)
- Electric system: 1,500 V DC Overhead wire
- Current collection: Pantograph
- Braking systems: Electronically controlled pneumatic brakes, regenerative braking
- Safety systems: D-ATC, Keio ATC, Keio ATS
- Coupling system: Shibata
- Track gauge: 1,372 mm (4 ft 6 in)

The Toei 10-300 series (都営10-300形, Toei 10-300-gata) is an electric multiple unit (EMU) train type operated by the Tokyo subway operator Tokyo Metropolitan Bureau of Transportation (Toei) on the Toei Shinjuku Line in Tokyo, Japan, since 2005.

== Overview ==
Based on the JR East E231 series design, the type consists of 10-300 series 8- and 10-car sets together with 10-300R series 8-car sets formed of refurbished 10-000 series intermediate cars sandwiched between newly built 10-300 series driving cars. 3rd-batch trainsets based on the JR East E233-2000 series design were introduced from September 2013.

== Operations ==
The 10-300 series and 10-300R series operate on the Toei Shinjuku Line between Shinjuku and Motoyawata, and also on inter-running services over the Keio Line from Shinjuku as far as Hashimoto on the Keio Sagamihara Line.

== Formations ==
As of 1 April 2017, the fleet consists of eight eight-car 10-300 series sets (10-370 to 10-440), and 15 ten-car 10-300 series sets (10-450 to 10-620), all based at Oshima Depot.

=== 10-300R series ===
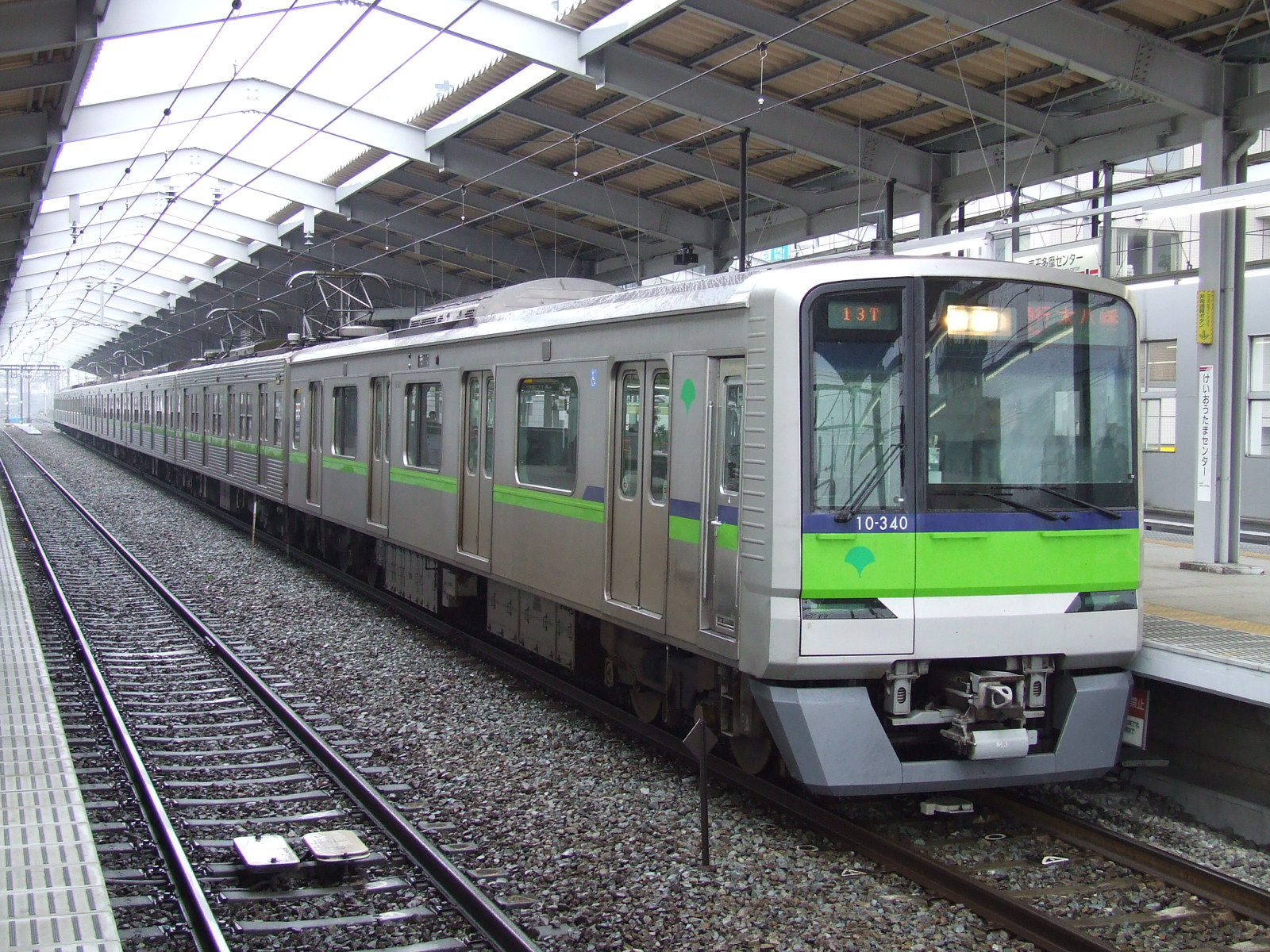
10-300R series set 10-340 in May 2006

The four eight-car 10-300R series sets (10-310 to 10-360) were formed as shown below with six motored (M) cars, two trailer (T) cars, and car 1 at the Shinjuku end.

Car No.	1	2	3	4	5	6	7	8
Designation	Tc2	M2'	M1	M2	M1	M2	M1	Tc1
Numbering	10-xx9	10-xx8	10-xx7	10-xx6	10-xx5	10-xx2	10-xx1	10-xx0

- "xx" corresponds to the set number.
- Cars 3 and 7 were each fitted with two lozenge-type pantographs, and car 5 had one.

=== 10-300 series 8-car sets ===
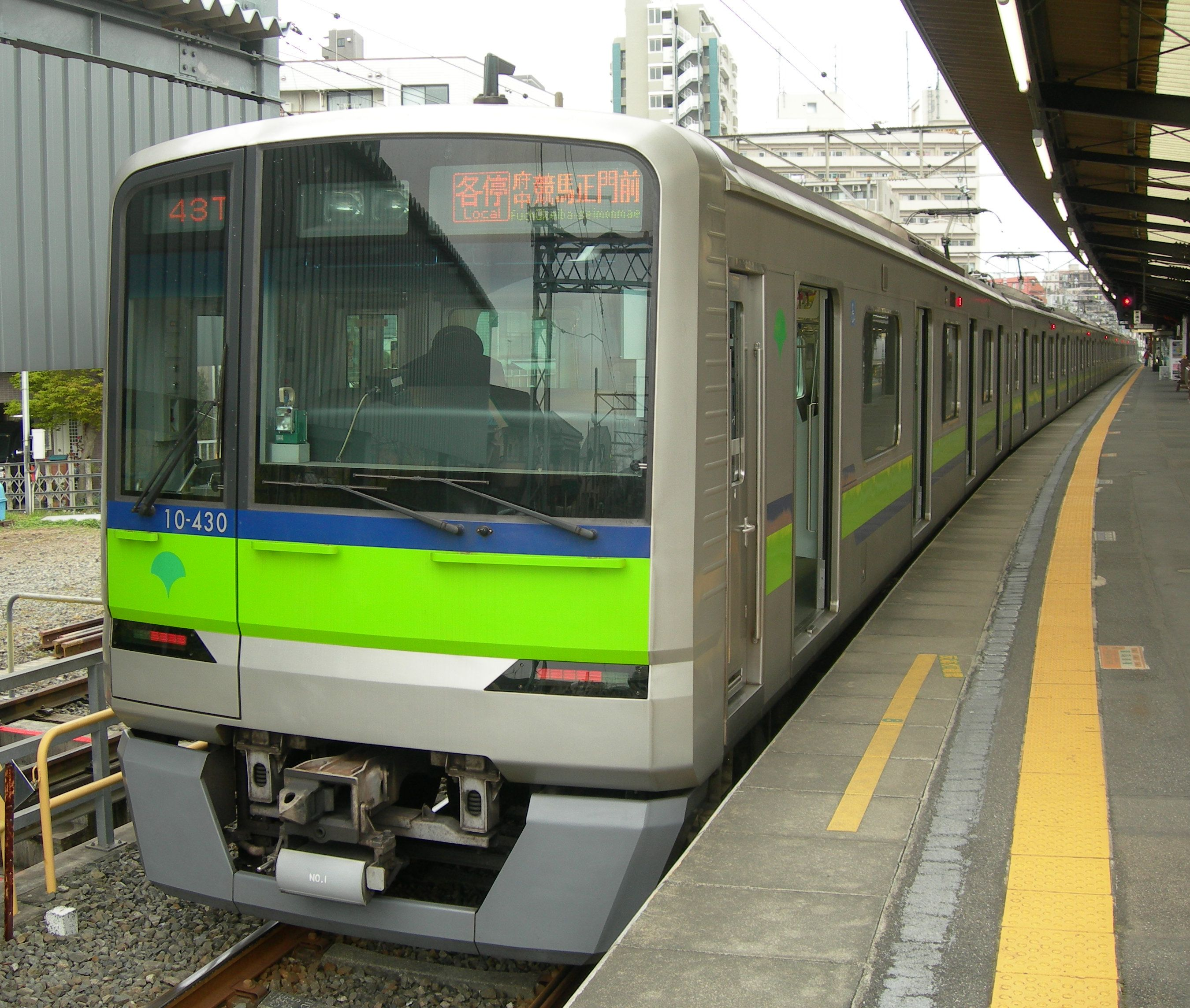
Eight-car set 10-430 in April 2010

The eight 8-car 10-300 series sets (10-370 to 10-440) are formed as shown below with five motored (M) cars and three trailer (T) cars, and car 1 at the Shinjuku end.

Car No.	1	2	3	4	5	6	7	8
Designation	Tc2	M2	M1	T	M1	M2	M1	Tc1
Numbering	10-xx9	10-xx8	10-xx7	10-xx6	10-xx5	10-xx2	10-xx1	10-xx0

- "xx" corresponds to the set number.
- Cars 3 and 7 are each fitted with two single-arm pantographs, and car 5 has one.

=== 10-300 series 10-car sets ===
The four 10-car 10-300 series sets (10-450 to 10-480) are formed as shown below with six motored (M) cars and four trailer (T) cars, and car 1 at the Shinjuku end.

Car No.	1	2	3	4	5	6	7	8	9	10
Designation	Tc2	M2	M1	T1	M1		T1	M2	M1	Tc1
Numbering	10-xx9	10-xx8	10-xx7	10-xx6	10-xx5	10-xx4	10-xx3	10-xx2	10-xx1	10-xx0
Weight (t)	27.2	29.3	30.2	23.8	29.3	28.6	23.8	29.4	30.1	27.1
Capacity (total/seated)	140/45	149/51	148/54						149/51	136/45

- "xx" corresponds to the set number.
- Cars 3, 5, and 9 are each fitted with two T-PT7154-A single-arm pantographs.

=== 3rd-batch 10-300 series 10-car sets ===
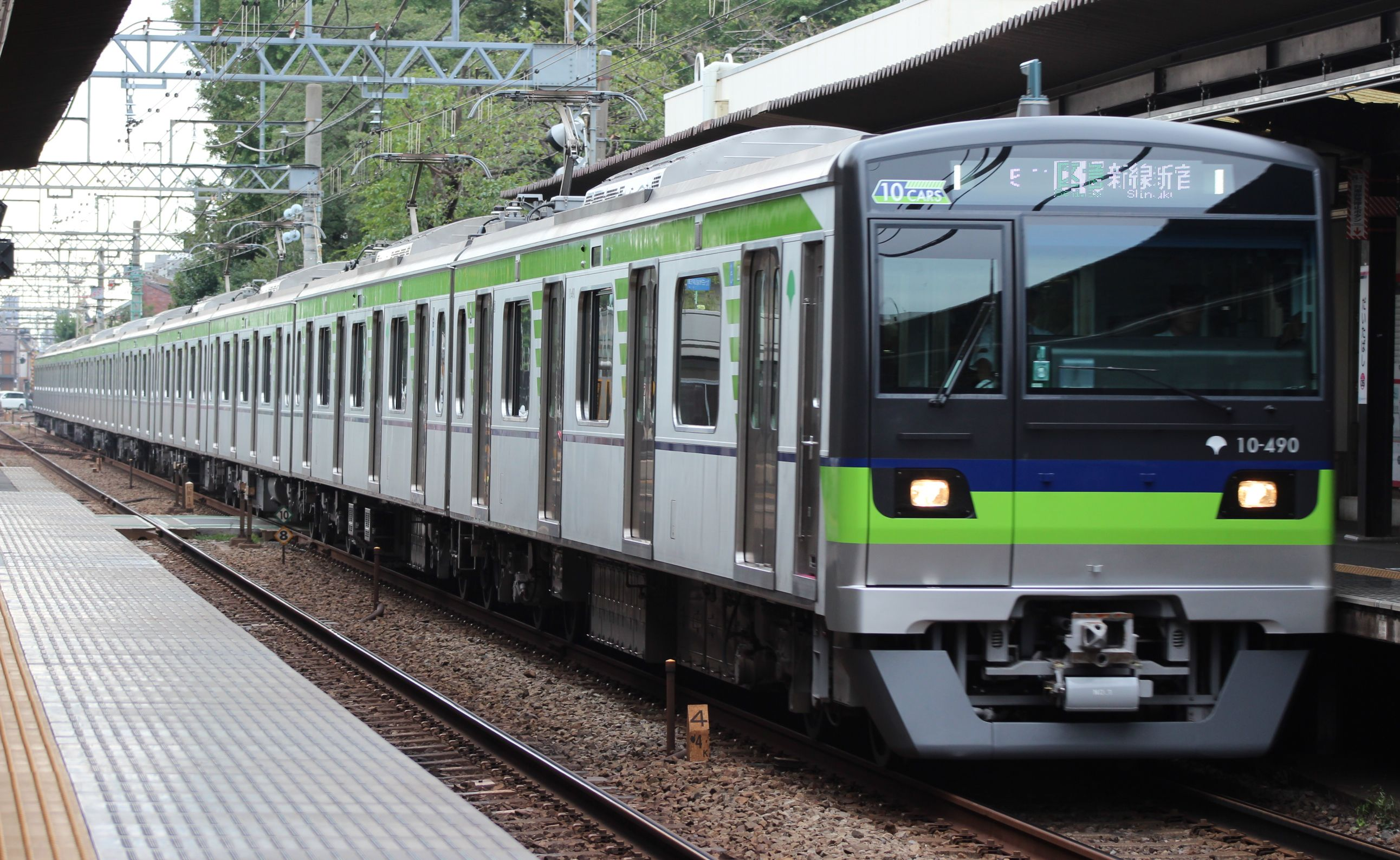
3rd-batch set 10-490 in October 2013

The 3rd-batch 10-300 series sets (10-490 to 10-510) delivered from 2013 are formed as shown below with six motored (M) cars and four trailer (T) cars.

Car No.	1	2	3	4	5	6	7	8	9	10
Designation	Tc9	M8	M7	T6	T5	M4	M3	M2	M1	Tc0
Numbering	10-xx9	10-xx8	10-xx7	10-xx6	10-xx5	10-xx4	10-xx3	10-xx2	10-xx1	10-xx0
Weight (t)	29.4	31.0	31.3	25.2	25.2	28.0	31.3	31.0	31.3	29.4
Capacity (total/seated)	132/45	145/51	144/54						145/51	132/45

- "xx" corresponds to the set number.
- Cars 3, 7, and 9 are each fitted with two T-PT7154-A single-arm pantographs.

=== 4th-batch 10-300 series 10-car sets ===
Three fourth-batch 10-car sets were introduced from May 2015. These sets differ from earlier built sets by the addition of a light green stripe running alongside the bodies, including on the doors. The fourth-batch sets (10-520 onward) are formed as shown below with six motored (M) cars and four trailer (T) cars.

Car No.	1	2	3	4	5	6	7	8	9	10
Designation	Tc9	M8	M7	T6	T5	M4	M3	M2	M1	Tc0
Numbering	10-xx9	10-xx8	10-xx7	10-xx6	10-xx5	10-xx4	10-xx3	10-xx2	10-xx1	10-xx0
Weight (t)	29.4	31.0	31.3	25.2	25.2	28.0	31.3	31.0	31.3	29.4
Capacity (total/seated)	132/45	145/51	144/54						145/51	132/45

- "xx" corresponds to the set number.
- Cars 3, 7, and 9 are each fitted with two single-arm pantographs.

== Interior ==
=== 1st/2nd batch sets ===
Passenger accommodation consists of longitudinal bench seating with individually sculpted seats covered with green moquette. Passenger information is provided by LED scrolling displays above the doorways.

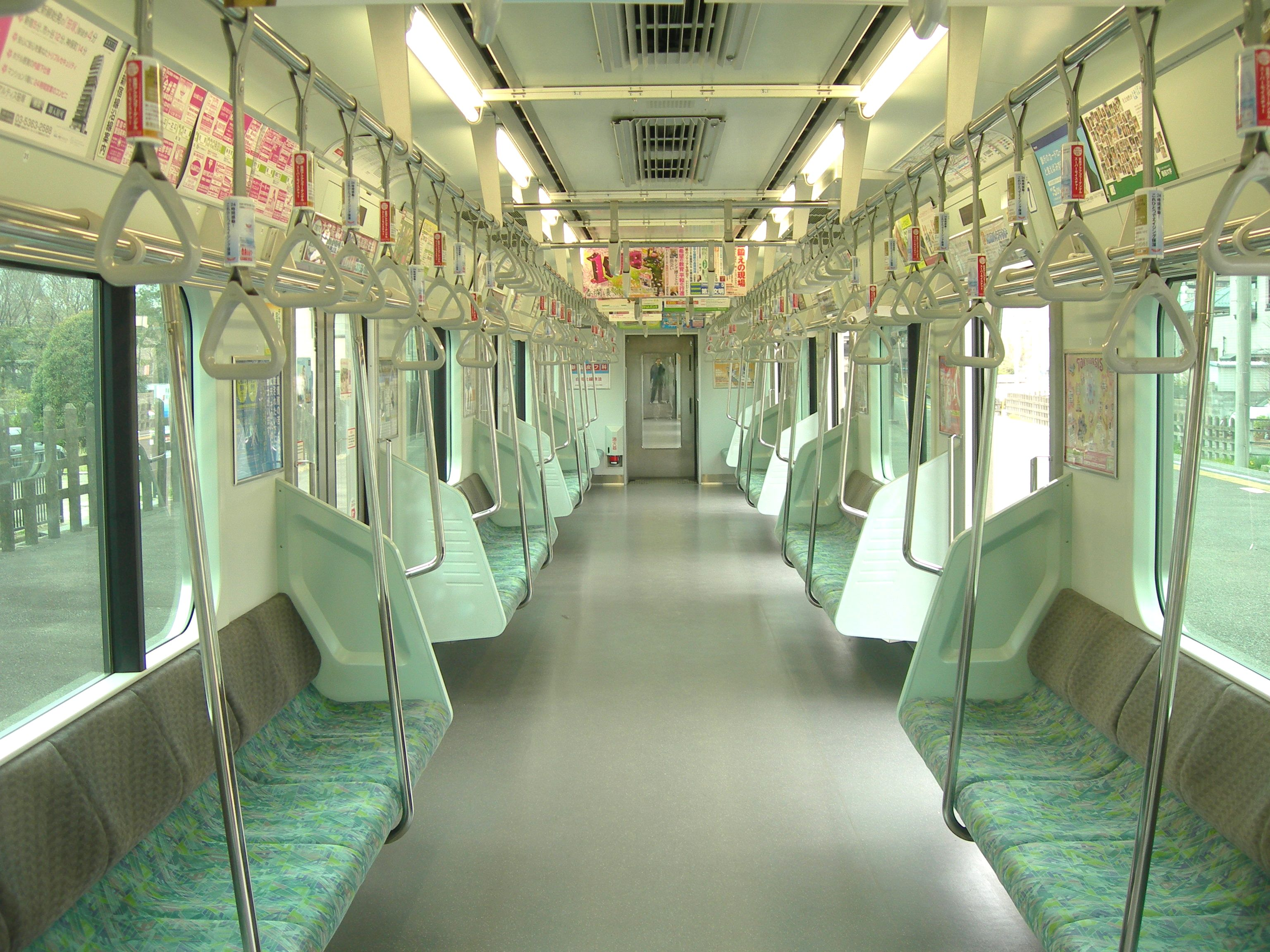
Interior view in April 2010

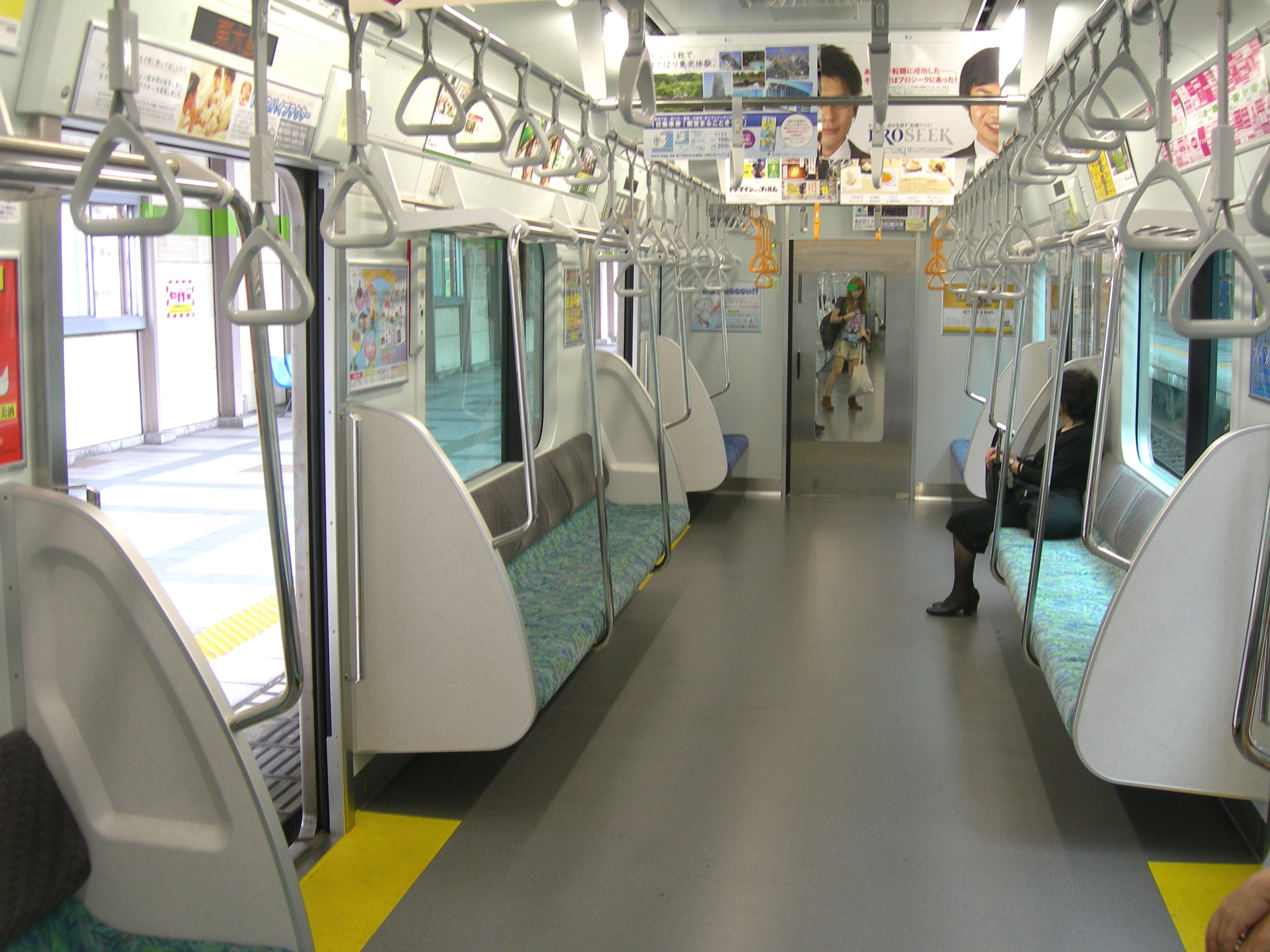
Interior of later-build car inserted into 10-car sets in August 2010

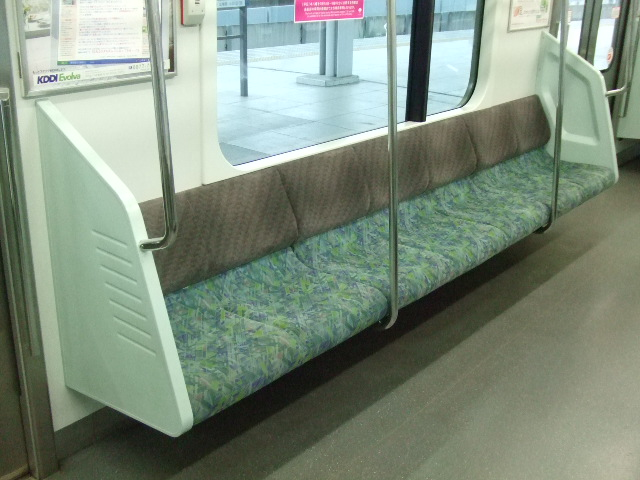
Seating in October 2007

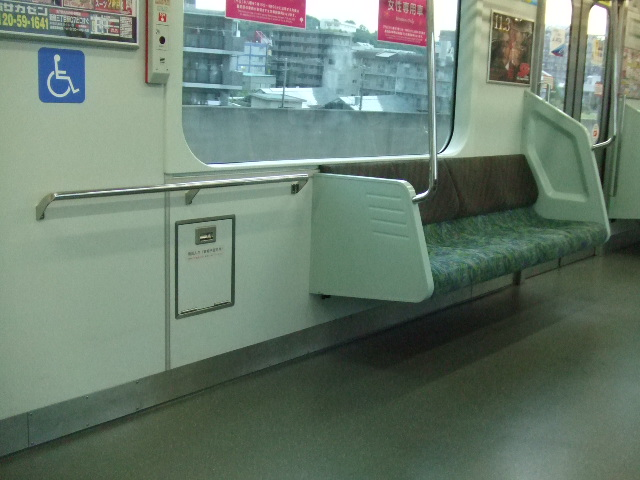
Wheelchair space in October 2007

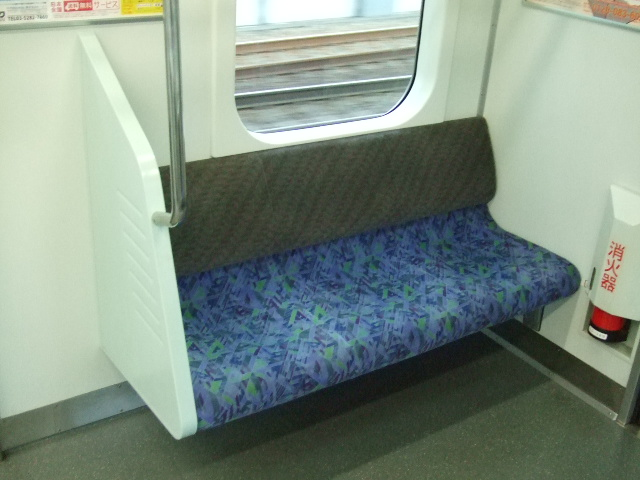
Priority seat in October 2007

=== 3rd-batch sets ===
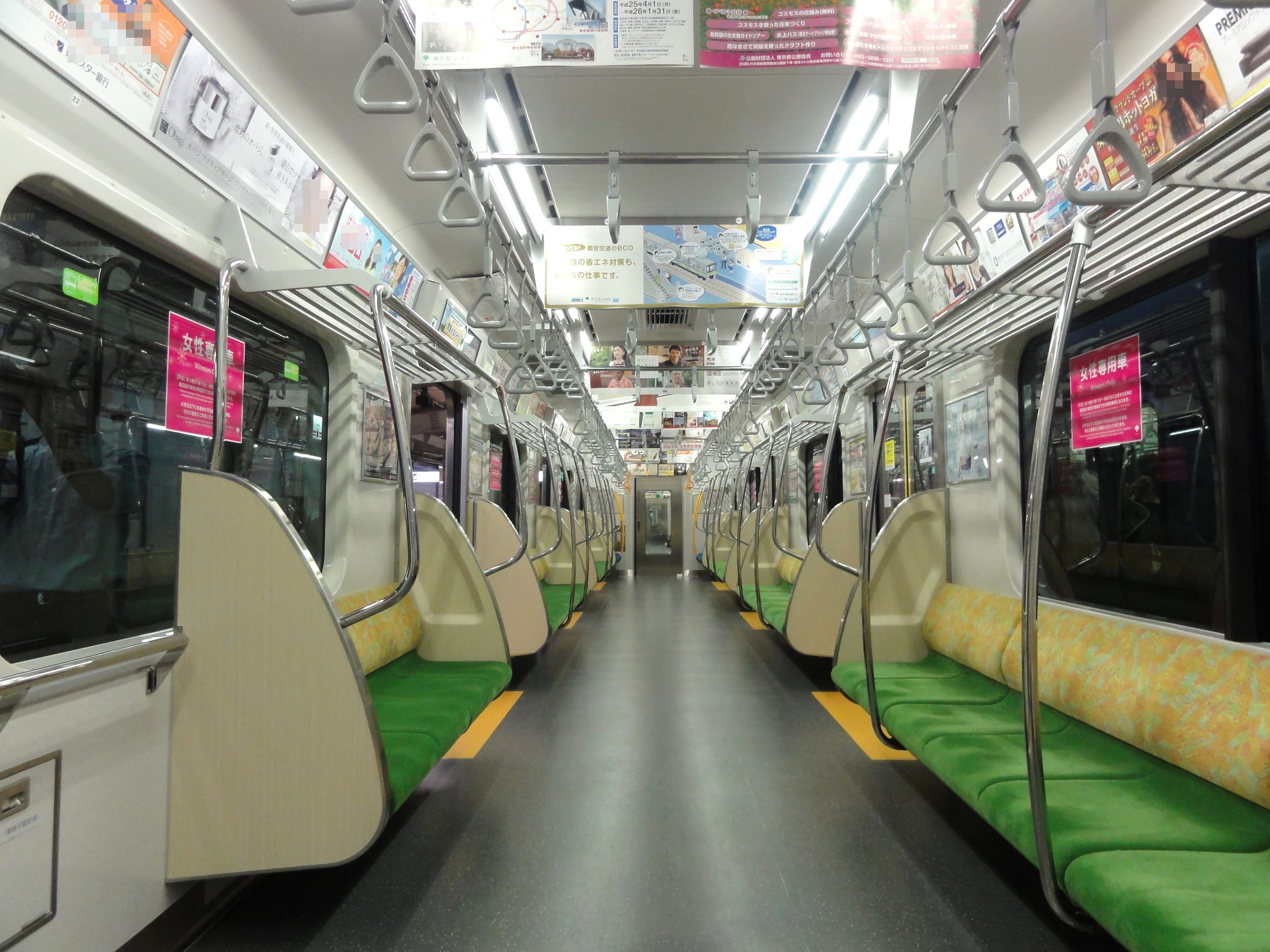
Interior view in October 2013

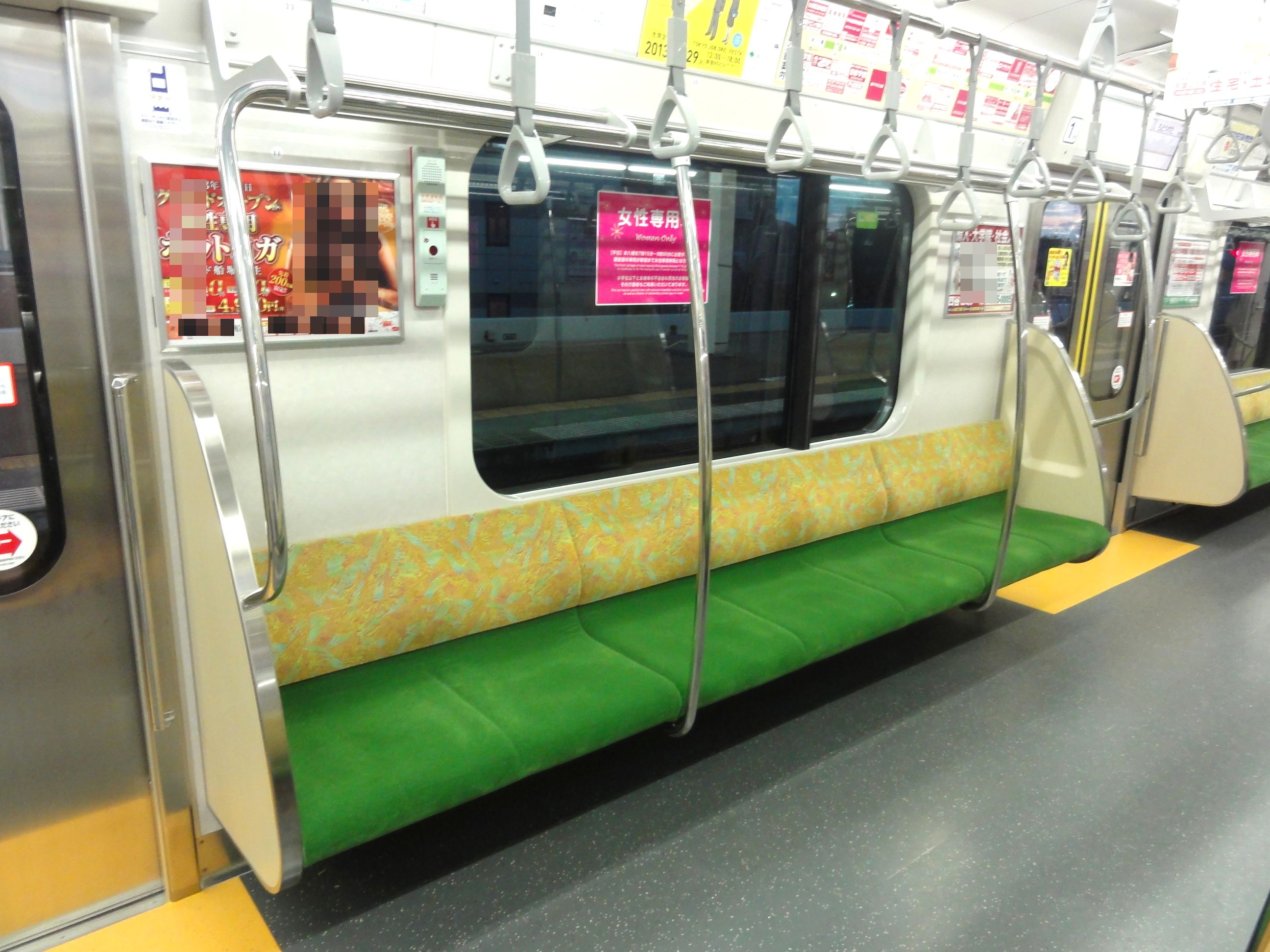
7-person bench seat in October 2013

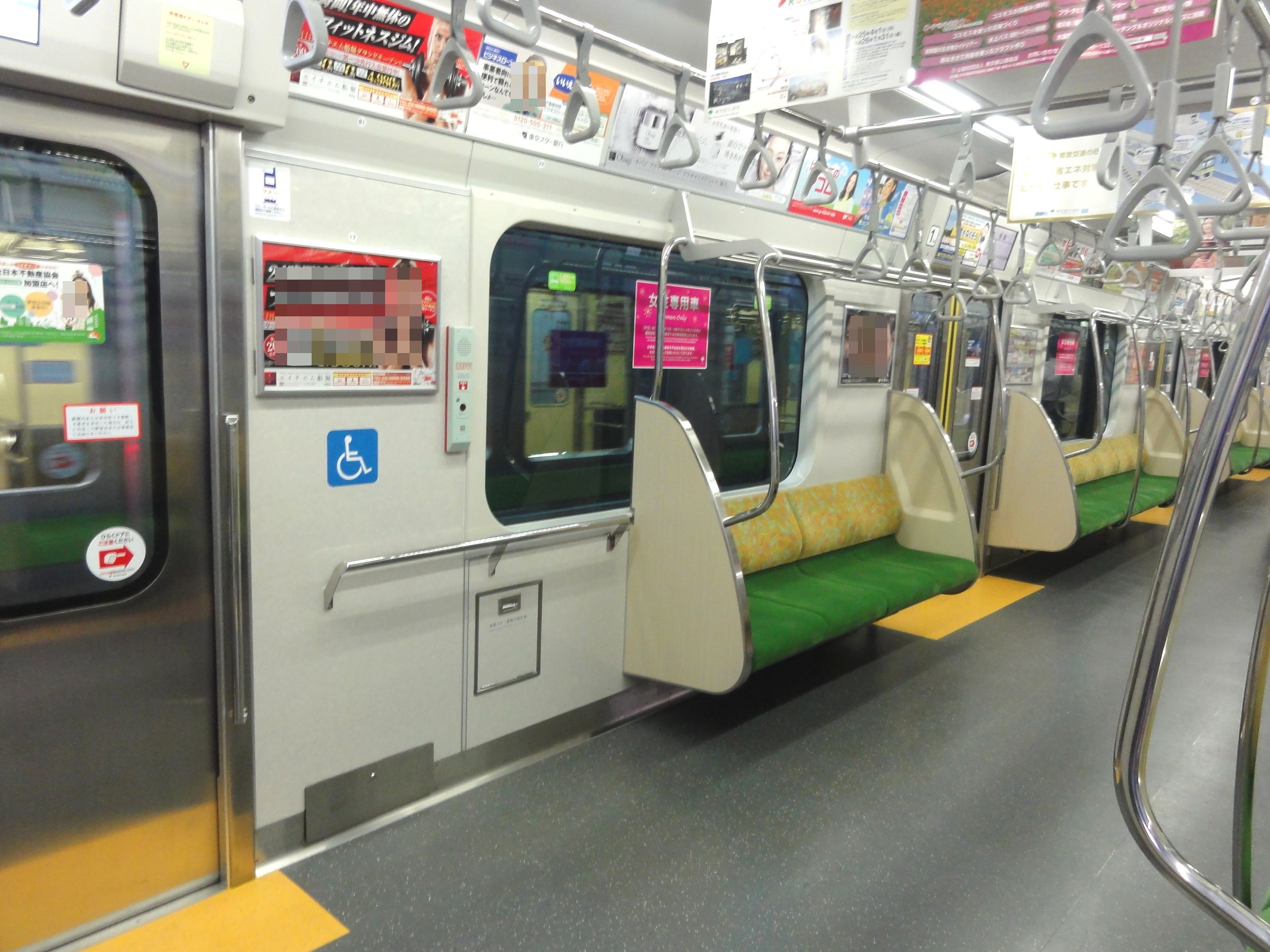
Wheelchair space in October 2013

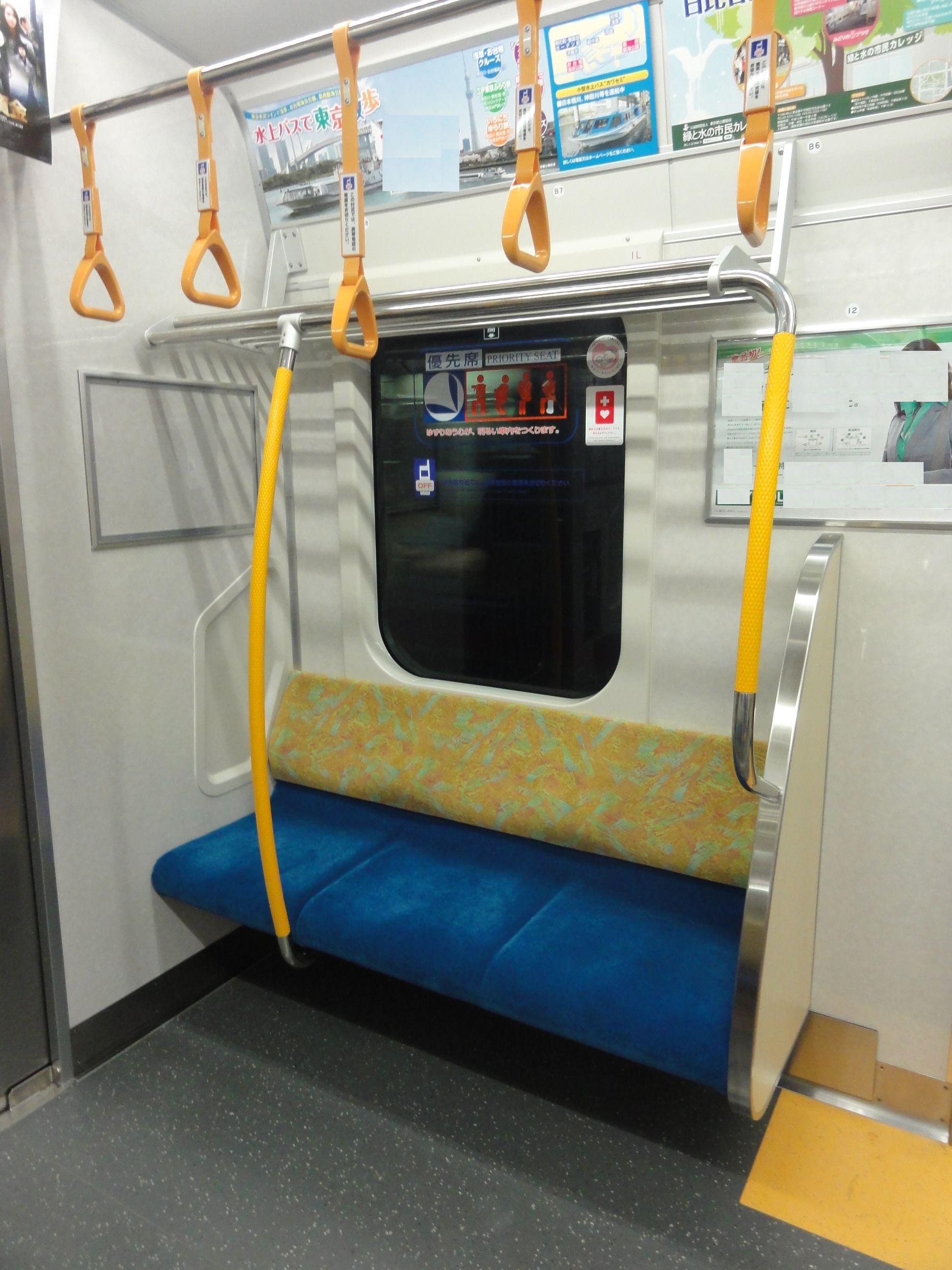
Priority seat in October 2013

=== 4th-batch sets ===
Three fourth-batch sets have two LCD passenger information screens above each doorway.

== History ==
Twelve eight-car 10-300 series sets (96 vehicles) were built between 2004 and 2006 to replace the older (1st and 2nd batch) 10-000 series sets dating from the late 1970s. These were designed to be lengthened to ten-car sets in the future with the insertion of additional motored and trailer cars as cars 3 and 4. The majority of the sets were built by Tokyu Car Corporation (now J-TREC) in Yokohama, but the intermediate cars of the three sets 10-450 to 10-470 were built at JR East's Niitsu factory in Niigata Prefecture, and these were transferred to Tokyu Car's Yokohama factory in two batches in January and February 2006 to be incorporated into the completed sets. The first set, 10-370, was delivered in November 2004 for night-time testing of the new D-ATC signalling system. The first sets entered revenue service on 21 May 2005.

The six eight-car 10-300R series sets were created in 2005 and 2006 by adding new 10-300 series driving cars built by Tokyu Car sandwiching three pairs of refurbished 10-xx7 and 10-xx8 cars from former 10-000 series sets 10-010 to 10-180.

The newly formed ten-car sets (10-450 to 10-480) entered revenue service from 1 June 2010. Lengthening from eight to ten cars involved inserting new 2nd-batch "10-4x3" (T1) trailer cars and "10-4x5" (M1) motored cars, and renumbering the original "10-4x5" cars to "10-4x4" as well as removing the original pantograph.

A further three new ten-car 3rd-batch sets were delivered during 2013. The first, set 10-490, entered revenue service on 15 September 2013. These sets are based on the JR East E233 series design.

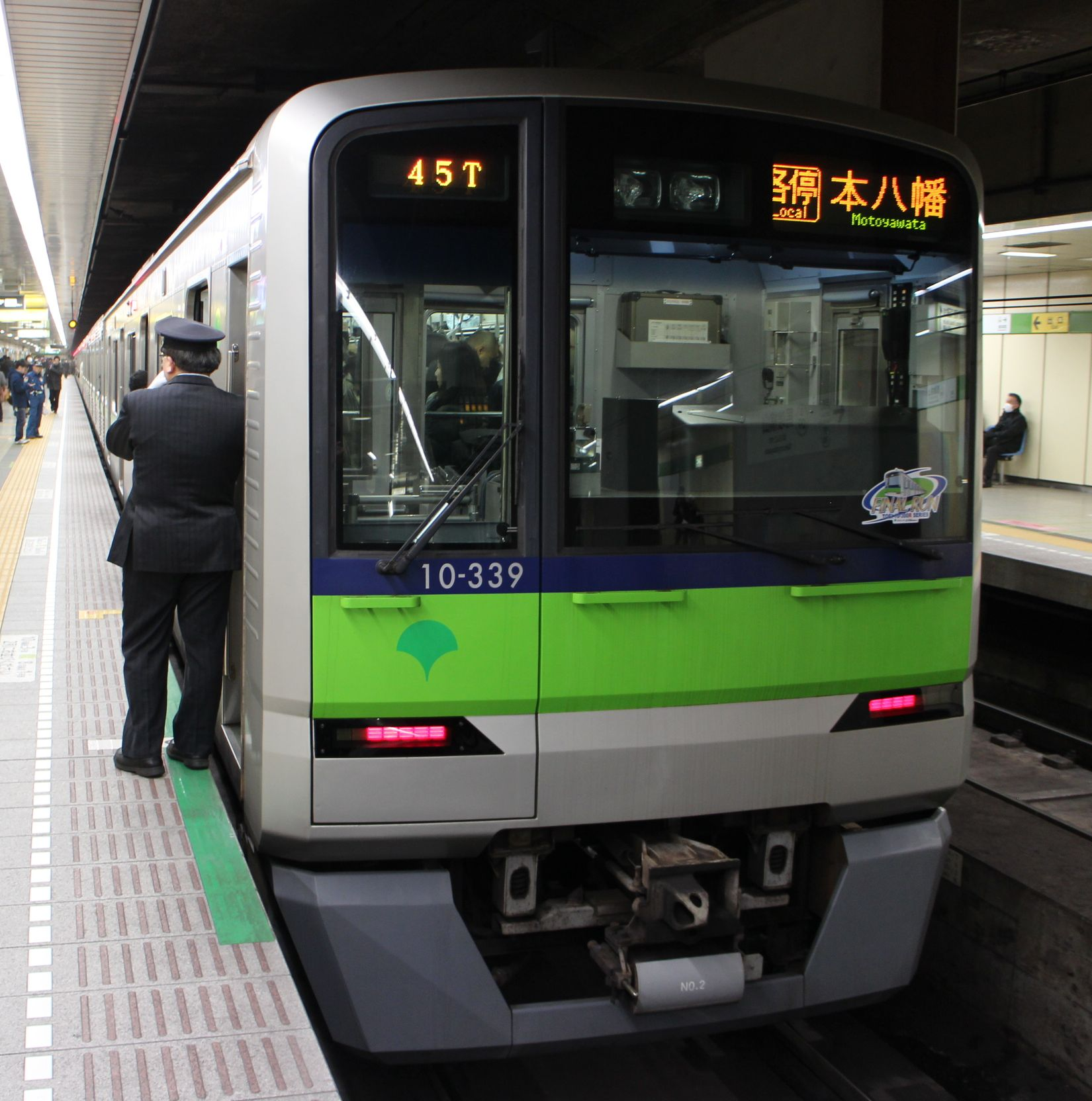
Set 10-330 on its last day in service on 14 February 2017

The last remaining 10-300R series set in service, set 10-330, was withdrawn following its final run on 14 February 2017.

It was announced by Toei that eight new ten-car sets would enter service from 28 November 2021; Toei also announced that some of the eight-car sets would be lengthened to ten-car sets by the end of 2022.

== Build histories ==
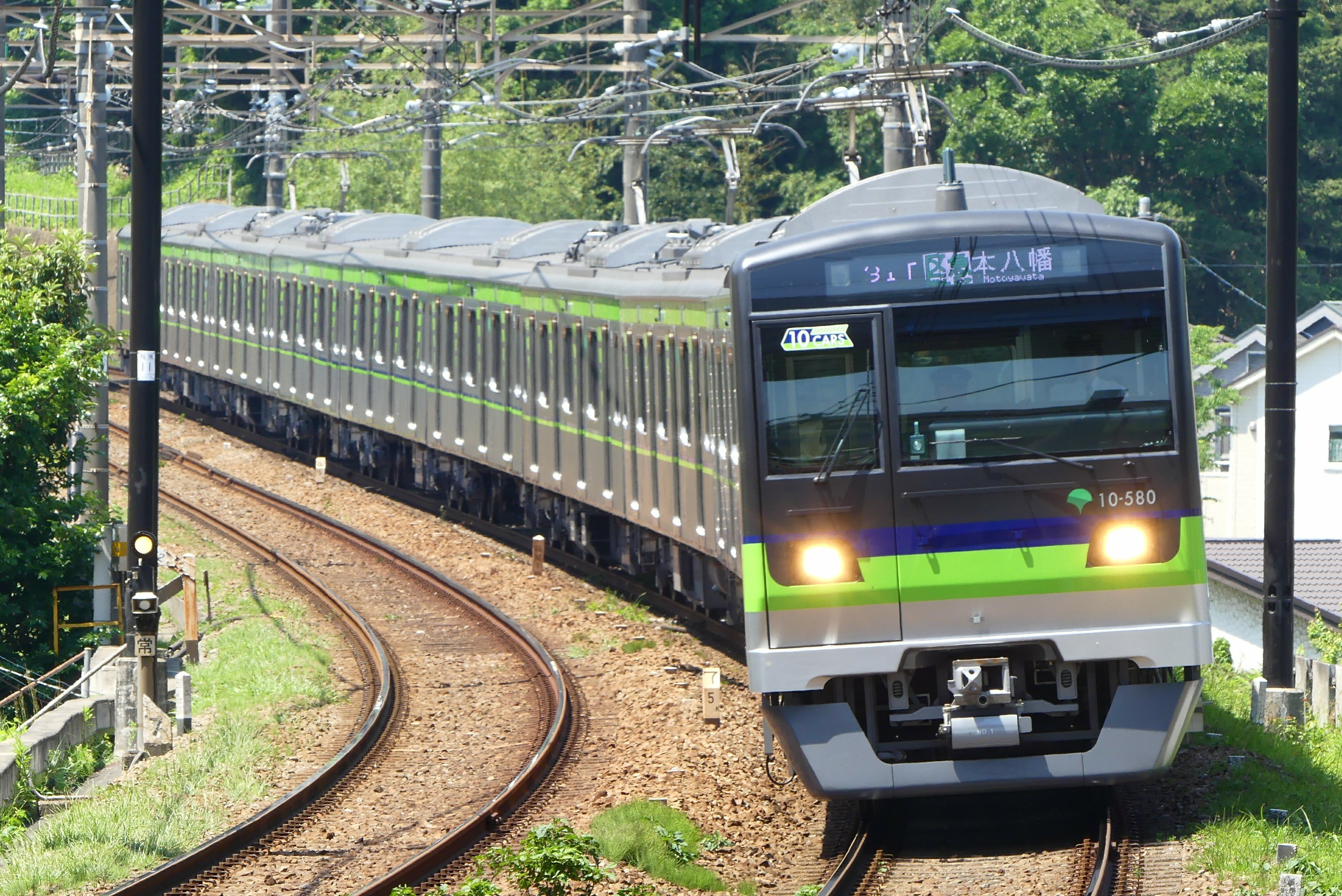
fourth-batch set 10-580 in May 2017

The build histories of the 10-300 series sets are as follows.

Set No.	Manufacturer	Build date	Notes
10-370	Tokyu Car, Yokohama	14 May 2005	1st batch
10-380	Tokyu Car, Yokohama	16 May 2005	1st batch
10-390	Tokyu Car, Yokohama	16 June 2005	1st batch
10-400	Tokyu Car, Yokohama	23 July 2005	1st batch
10-410	Tokyu Car, Yokohama	1 September 2005	1st batch
10-420	Tokyu Car, Yokohama	29 September 2005	1st batch
10-430	Tokyu Car, Yokohama	24 November 2005	1st batch
10-440	Tokyu Car, Yokohama	22 December 2005	1st batch
10-450	Tokyu Car/Niitsu	7 April 2006	1st batch
10-460	Tokyu Car/Niitsu	27 April 2006	1st batch
10-470	Tokyu Car/Niitsu	23 June 2006	1st batch
10-480	Tokyu Car/Niitsu	13 July 2006	1st batch
10-490	J-TREC, Yokohama	7 August 2013	3rd batch
10-500	J-TREC, Yokohama	30 October 2013	3rd batch
10-510	J-TREC, Yokohama	3 December 2013	3rd batch
10-520	J-TREC, Yokohama	13 May 2015	4th batch
10-530	J-TREC, Yokohama	10 June 2015	4th batch
10-540	J-TREC, Yokohama	1 July 2015	4th batch
10-550	J-TREC, Yokohama	28 April 2016	5th batch
10-560	J-TREC, Yokohama	31 May 2016	5th batch
10-570	J-TREC, Yokohama	28 June 2016	5th batch
10-590			5th batch
10-610	J-TREC, Yokohama	28 July 2016	5th batch
10-620	J-TREC, Yokohama	7 September 2016	5th batch
10-630	J-TREC, Yokohama	2 August 2017	5th batch
10-640	J-TREC, Yokohama	6 September 2017	
