= Toei 10-000 series =

Japanese train type

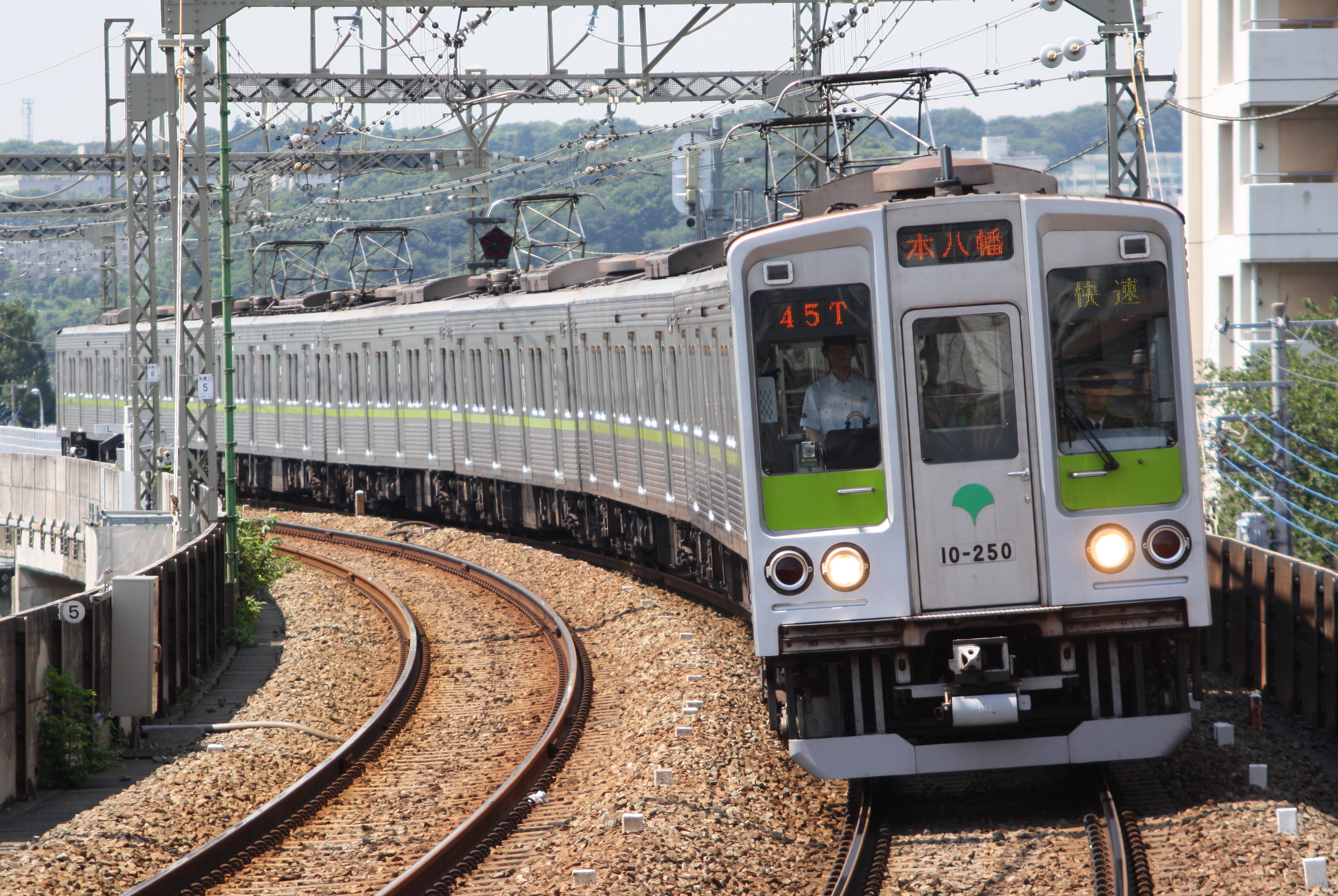
- 7th-batch set 10-250 in June 2009
- In service: December 1978 – February 2018
- Manufacturers: Alna Koki, Hitachi, Kawasaki Heavy Industries, Kinki Sharyo, Nippon Sharyo, Tokyu Car
- Constructed: 1971–1997
- Entered service: 21 December 1978
- Refurbished: 2009–
- Number built: 224 vehicles (28 sets)
- Number in service: None
- Formation: 8 cars per set
- Operator: Toei Subway
- Depot: Ojima
- Lines served: Toei Shinjuku Line, Keio Line, Keio Sagamihara Line

Specifications
- Car body construction: Stainless steel
- Car length: 20,000 mm (65 ft 7 3/8 in)
- Width: 2,800 mm (9 ft 2 1/4 in)
- Doors: 4 pairs per side
- Maximum speed: 120 km/h (75 mph)
- Traction system: Chopper control
- Acceleration: 3.3 km/(h⋅s) (2.1 mph/s)
- Deceleration: 4.0 km/(h⋅s) (2.5 mph/s) (service); 4.5 km/(h⋅s) (2.8 mph/s) (emergency)
- Electric system: 1,500 V DC overhead wire
- Current collection: Pantograph
- Safety system: ATC
- Track gauge: 1,372 mm (4 ft 6 in)

The Toei 10-000 series (都営10-000形, Toei 10-000-gata) was an electric multiple unit (EMU) train type operated by the Tokyo subway operator Tokyo Metropolitan Bureau of Transportation (Toei) on the Toei Shinjuku Line in Tokyo, Japan, from 1978 until 2018.

== Operations ==
The 10-000 series operated on the Toei Shinjuku Line between Shinjuku and Motoyawata, and also on inter-running services over the Keio Line from Shinjuku as far as Hashimoto on the Keio Sagamihara Line.

== Formations ==
By April 2017, the fleet consisted of five eight-car sets (sets 10-240 to 10-280) with six motored (M) cars and two trailer (T) cars, formed as shown below, with car 1 at the Shinjuku end.

Car No.	1	2	3	4	5	6	7	8
Designation	Tc2	M2'	M1	M2	M1	M2	M1	Tc1
Numbering	10-xx9	10-xx8	10-xx7	10-xx6	10-xx5	10-xx2	10-xx1	10-xx0

- "xx" corresponds to the set number.
- Cars 3 and 7 were each fitted with two lozenge-type pantographs, and car 5 was fitted with one.

== Interior ==
Passenger accommodation consisted of longitudinal bench seating throughout. Wheelchair spaces were added when the original six-car sets were lengthened to eight-car sets.

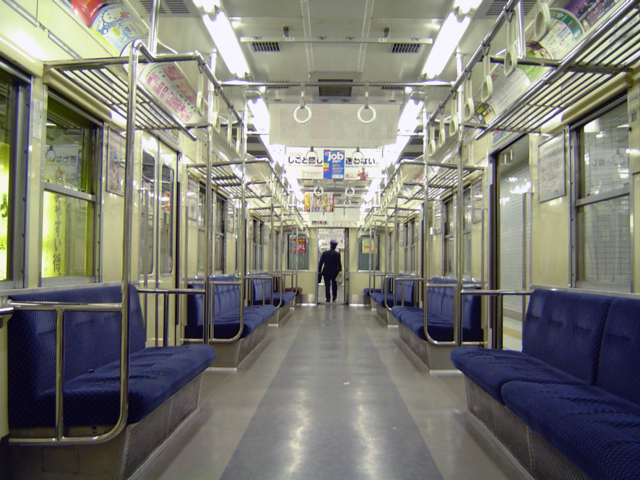
Interior view of a prototype set in November 2004

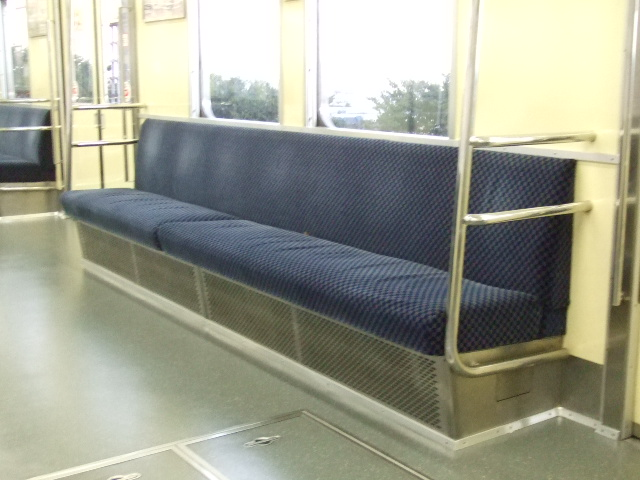
Seating in October 2007

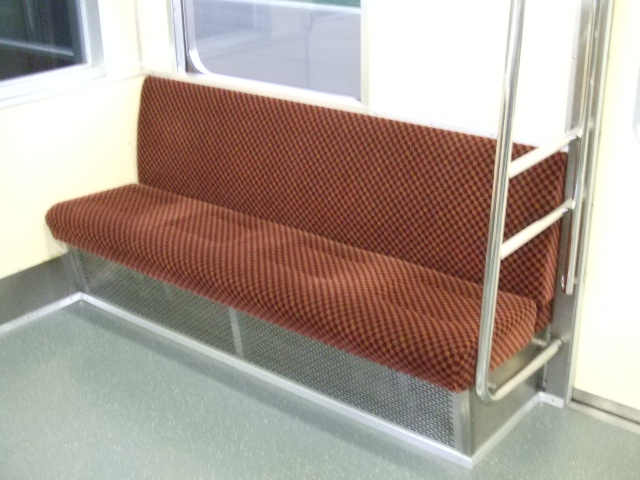
Priority seat in October 2007

== History ==
The prototype set, 10-010, was built in 1971, and initially tested on the Toei Mita Line.

Refurbishment commenced in fiscal 2009. This consisted of adding external speakers, replacing the original roller blind destination indicators with LED indicators, moving the body side destination indicators from the ends to a central position, and adding interior passenger information displays.

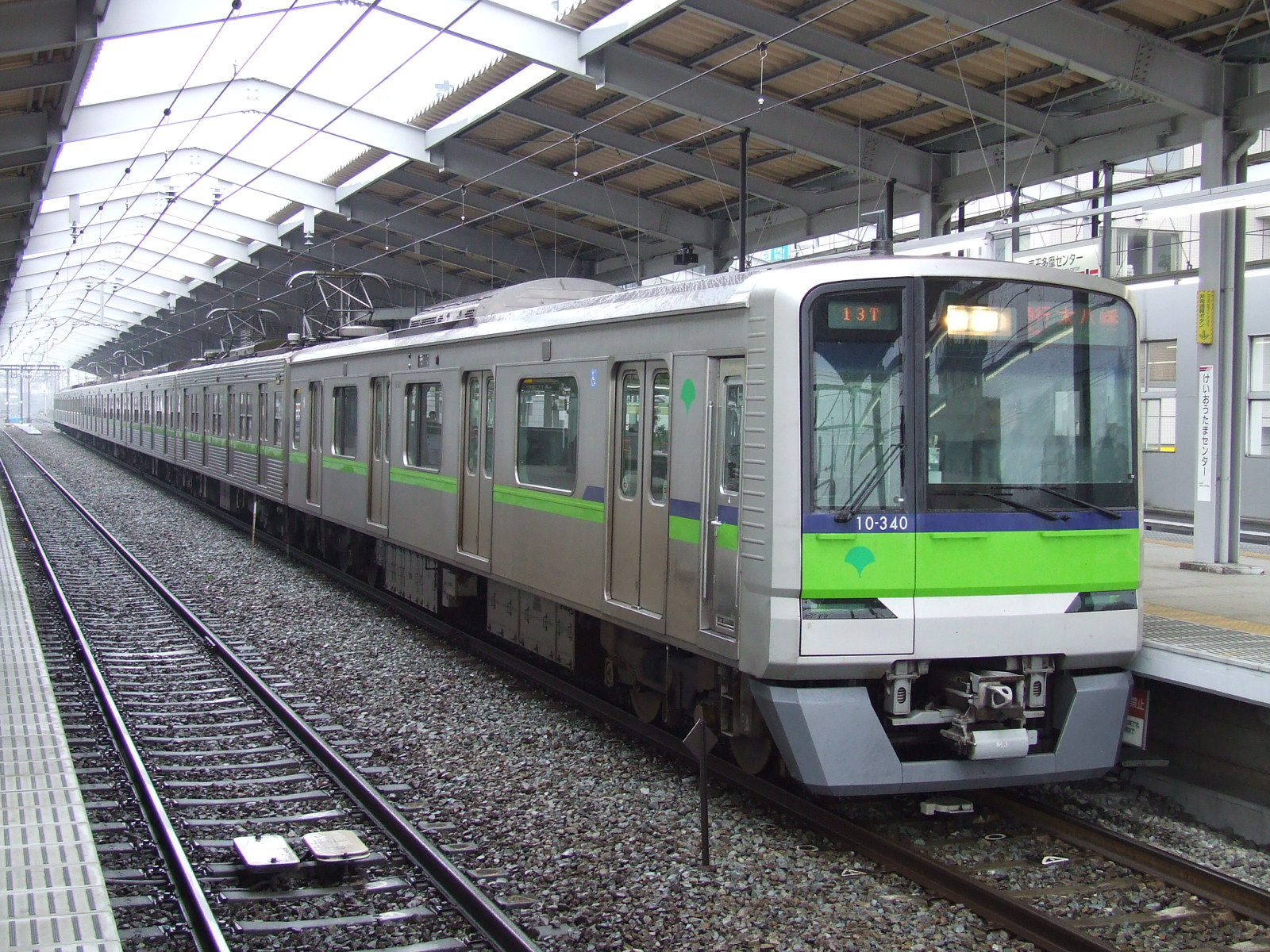
10-300R series set 10-340, formed of former 10-000 series intermediate cars, May 2006

In 2005 and 2006, the 10-xx7 and 10-xx8 cars of sets 10-010 to 10-180 were refurbished and reformed with new driving cars to become 10-300R series. These cars were built between 1986 and 1989 as batches 3 and 5 to lengthen original 6-car sets to 8 cars, and so were still relatively new compared to the rest of the cars in the sets in which they were contained.

The final set, 10-280, was retired on 11 February 2018.

== Build details ==
Set No.	Batch	Delivery date	Manufacturer	Remarks
10-010	-	26 November 1971	Nippon Sharyo	Prototype, built as 4-car set. Lengthened to 6 cars in November 1978, and to 8 cars in October 1988.
10-020	1	10 November 1978	Tokyu Car	Initially built as 6-car sets. Lengthened to 8 cars with addition of 5th-batch cars between 1988 and 1989.
10-030	1	10 November 1978	Tokyu Car	Initially built as 6-car sets. Lengthened to 8 cars with addition of 5th-batch cars between 1988 and 1989.
10-040	1	10 November 1978	Tokyu Car	Initially built as 6-car sets. Lengthened to 8 cars with addition of 5th-batch cars between 1988 and 1989.
10-050	1	10 November 1978	Tokyu Car	Initially built as 6-car sets. Lengthened to 8 cars with addition of 5th-batch cars between 1988 and 1989.
10-060	1	10 November 1978	Tokyu Car	Initially built as 6-car sets. Lengthened to 8 cars with addition of 5th-batch cars between 1988 and 1989.
10-070	1	10 November 1978	Tokyu Car	Initially built as 6-car sets. Lengthened to 8 cars with addition of 5th-batch cars between 1988 and 1989.
10-080	1	10 November 1978	Tokyu Car	Initially built as 6-car sets. Lengthened to 8 cars with addition of 5th-batch cars between 1988 and 1989.
10-090	1	10 November 1978	Tokyu Car	Initially built as 6-car sets. Lengthened to 8 cars with addition of 5th-batch cars between 1988 and 1989.
10-100	2	20 October 1979	Nippon Sharyo	Initially built as 6-car sets. Lengthened to 8 cars with addition of 5th-batch cars in 1989
10-110	2	20 October 1979	Nippon Sharyo	Initially built as 6-car sets. Lengthened to 8 cars with addition of 5th-batch cars in 1989
10-120	2	20 October 1979	Nippon Sharyo	Initially built as 6-car sets. Lengthened to 8 cars with addition of 3rd-batch cars in July 1986.
10-130	2	17 December 1979	Nippon Sharyo	Initially built as 6-car sets. Lengthened to 8 cars with addition of 3rd-batch cars in July 1986.
10-140	2	17 December 1979	Nippon Sharyo	Initially built as 6-car sets. Lengthened to 8 cars with addition of 3rd-batch cars in July 1986.
10-150	2	17 December 1979	Nippon Sharyo	Initially built as 6-car sets. Lengthened to 8 cars with addition of 3rd-batch cars in July 1986.
10-160	2	17 December 1979	Nippon Sharyo	Initially built as 6-car sets. Lengthened to 8 cars with addition of 3rd-batch cars in July 1986.
10-170	2	17 December 1979	Nippon Sharyo	Initially built as 6-car sets. Lengthened to 8 cars with addition of 3rd-batch cars in July 1986.
10-180	2	17 December 1979	Nippon Sharyo	Initially built as 6-car sets. Lengthened to 8 cars with addition of 3rd-batch cars in July 1986.
10-190	3	23 April 1986	Hitachi	Air-conditioning fitted 1993–1995.
10-200	3	20 May 1986	Hitachi	Air-conditioning fitted 1993–1995.
10-210	3	25 July 1986	Hitachi	Air-conditioning fitted 1993–1995.
10-220	4	10 May 1988	Kinki Sharyo	
10-230	4	24 May 1988	Kinki Sharyo	
10-240	6	27 February 1989	Kinki Sharyo	
10-250	7	25 March 1992	Kinki Sharyo	
10-260	7	25 March 1992	Kinki Sharyo	
10-270	8	12 December 1997	Alna Koki	Lightweight stainless steel construction.
10-280	8	12 December 1997	Alna Koki	Lightweight stainless steel construction.

The original six-car sets were later lengthened to eight cars with the addition of pairs of 3rd-batch (14 vehicles built in 1986 by Hitachi) and 5th-batch (22 vehicles built between 1988 and 1989 by Kawasaki Heavy Industries) cars.

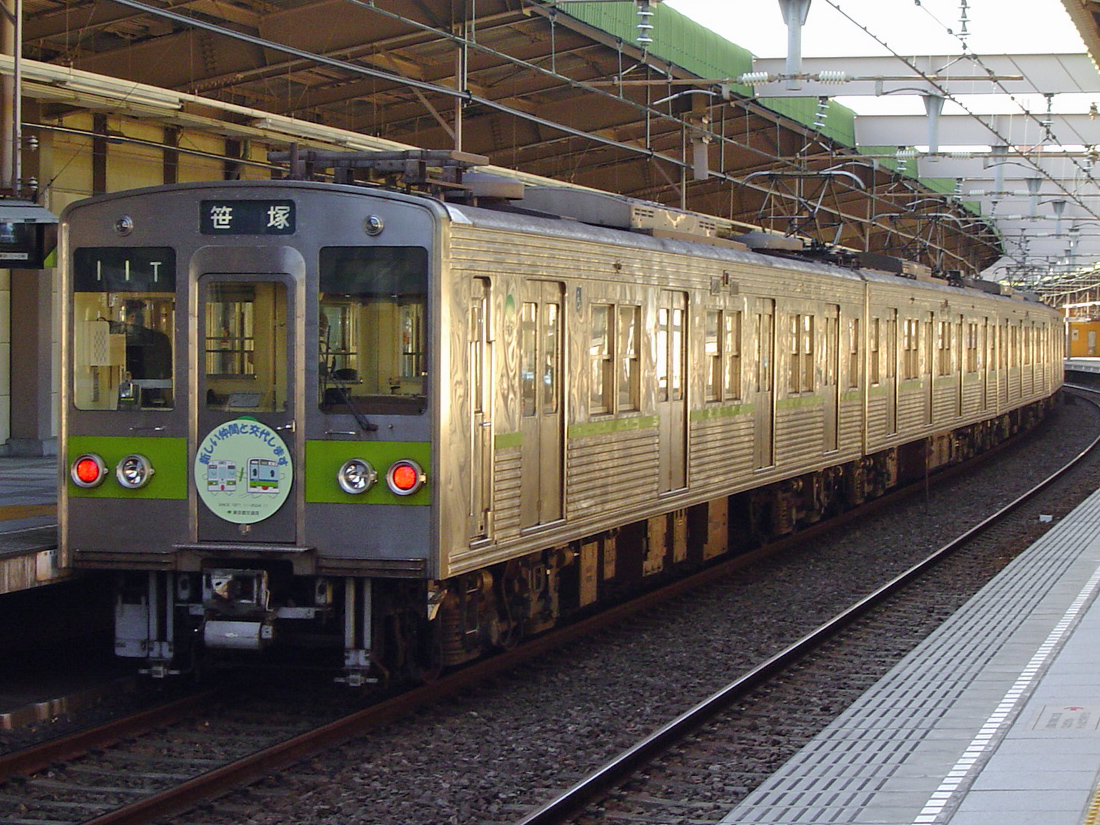
Prototype set 10-010 in November 2004

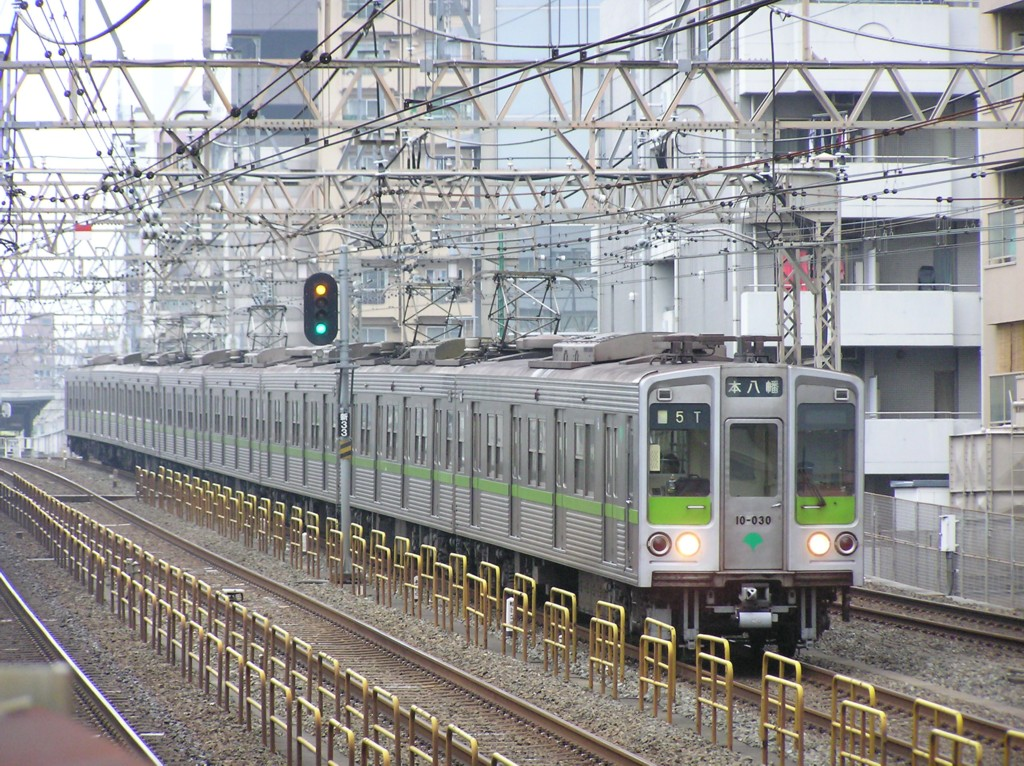
1st-batch set 10-030 in July 2006

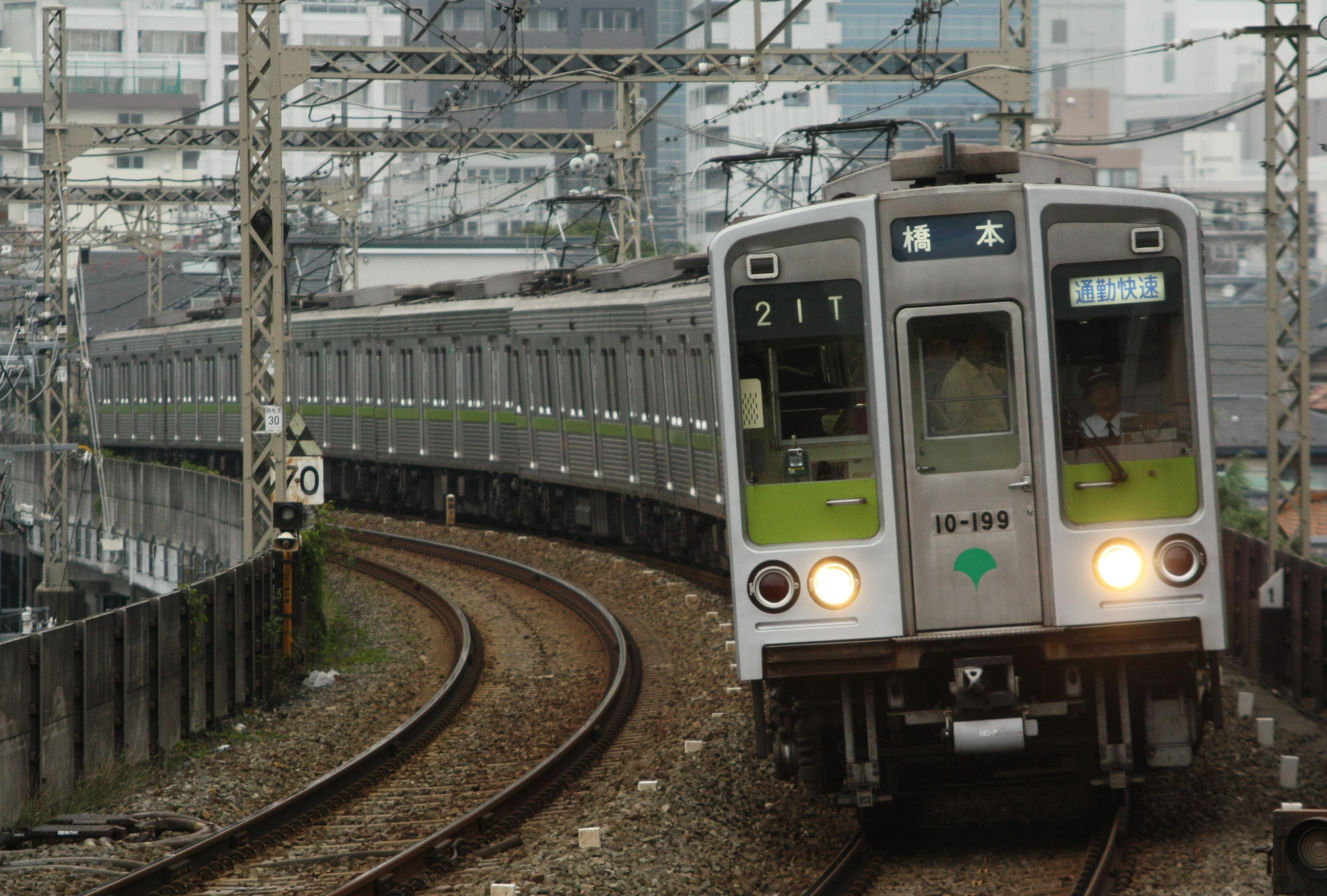
3rd-batch set 10-190 in October 2009

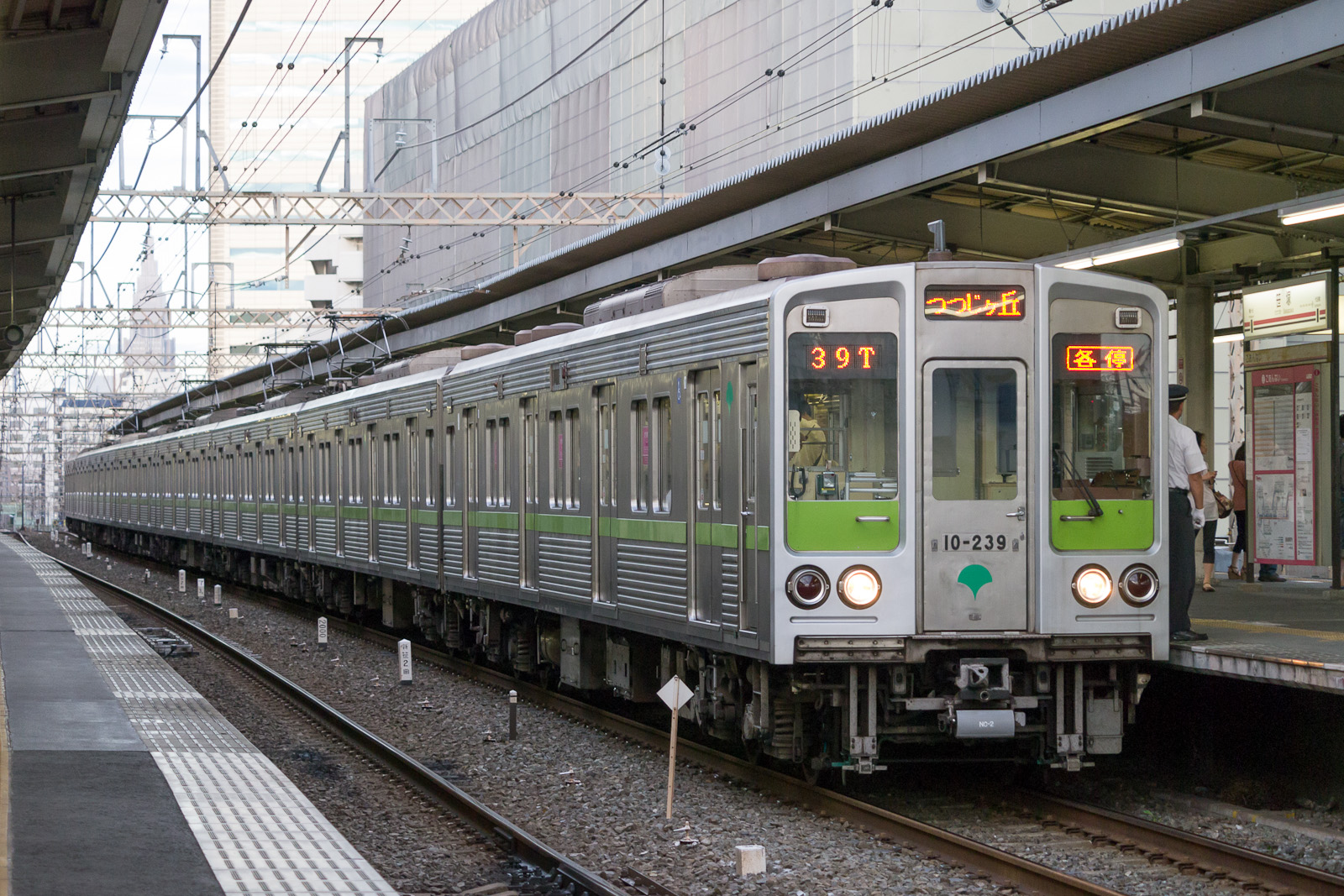
Refurbished 4th-batch set 10-230 in August 2012

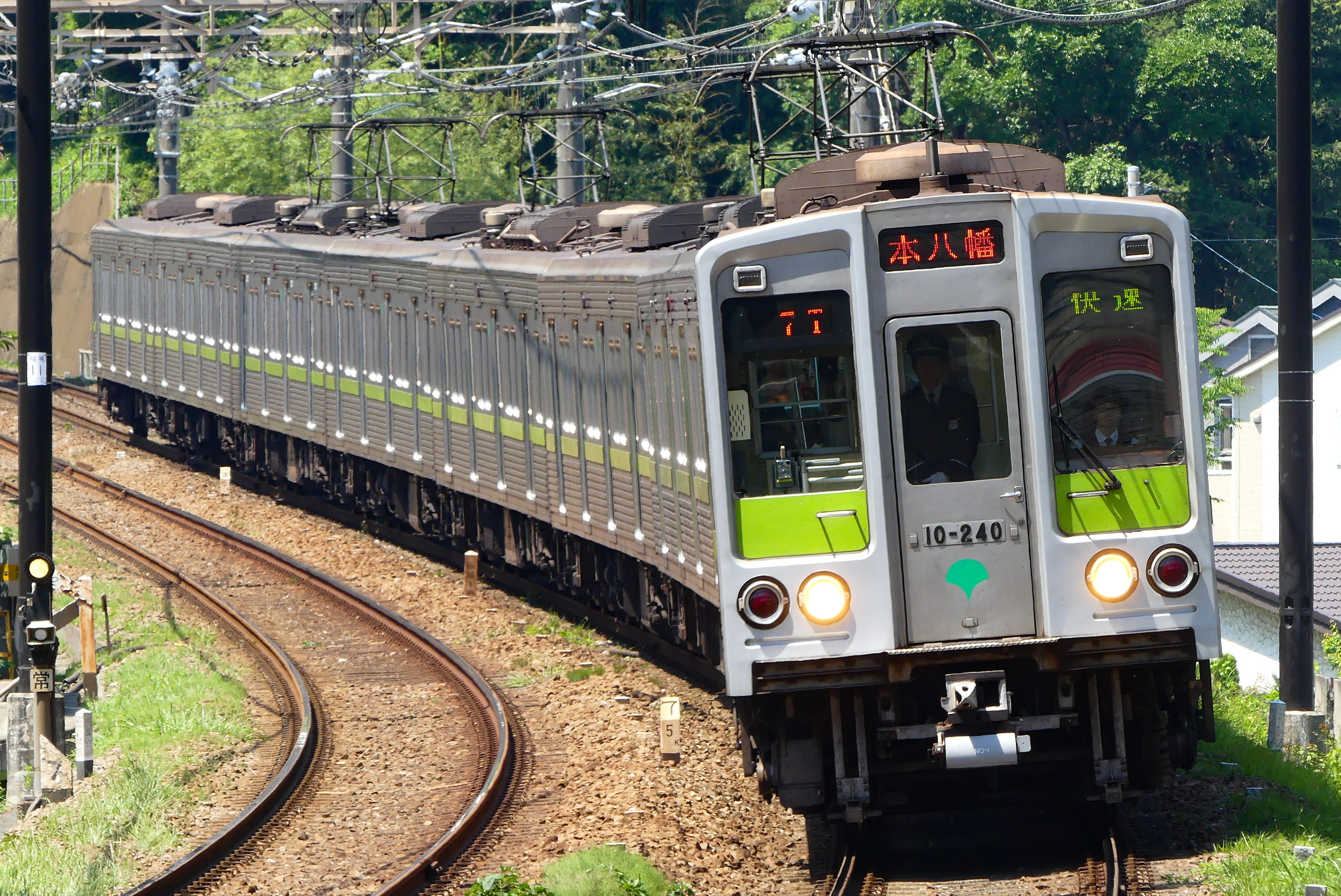
6th-batch set 10-240 in May 2017

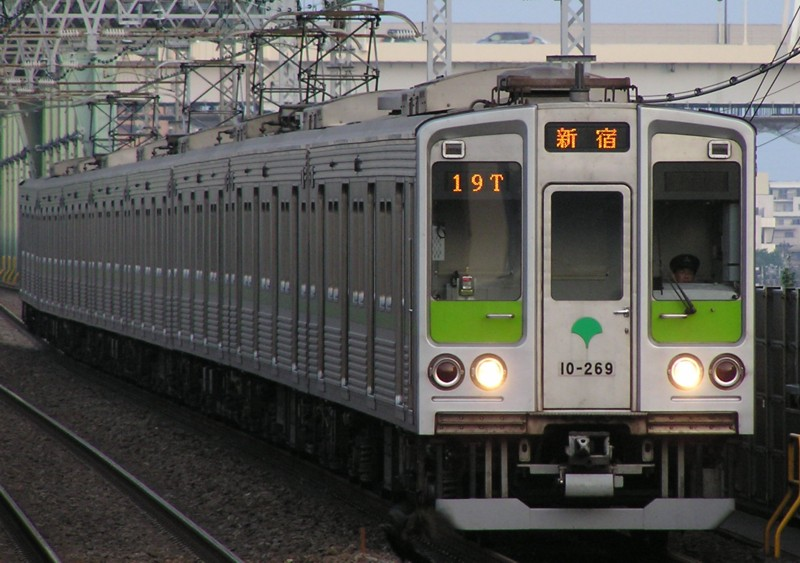
7th-batch set 10-260 in October 2006

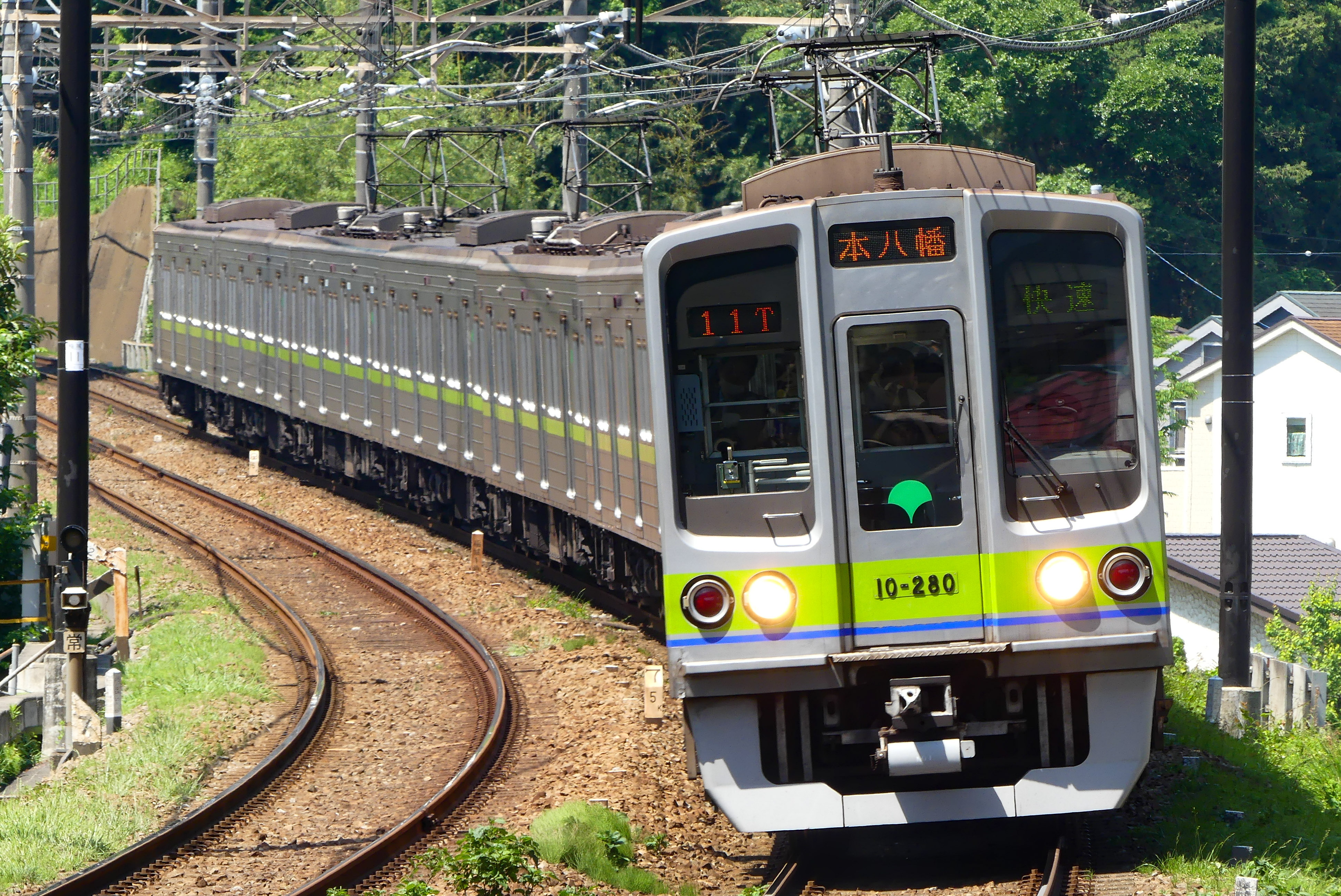
8th-batch set 10-280 in May 2017
