= Hatagaya Station =

Railway station in Tokyo, Japan

Coordinates: 35.677°N 139.6762°E

Hatagaya Station 幡ヶ谷駅

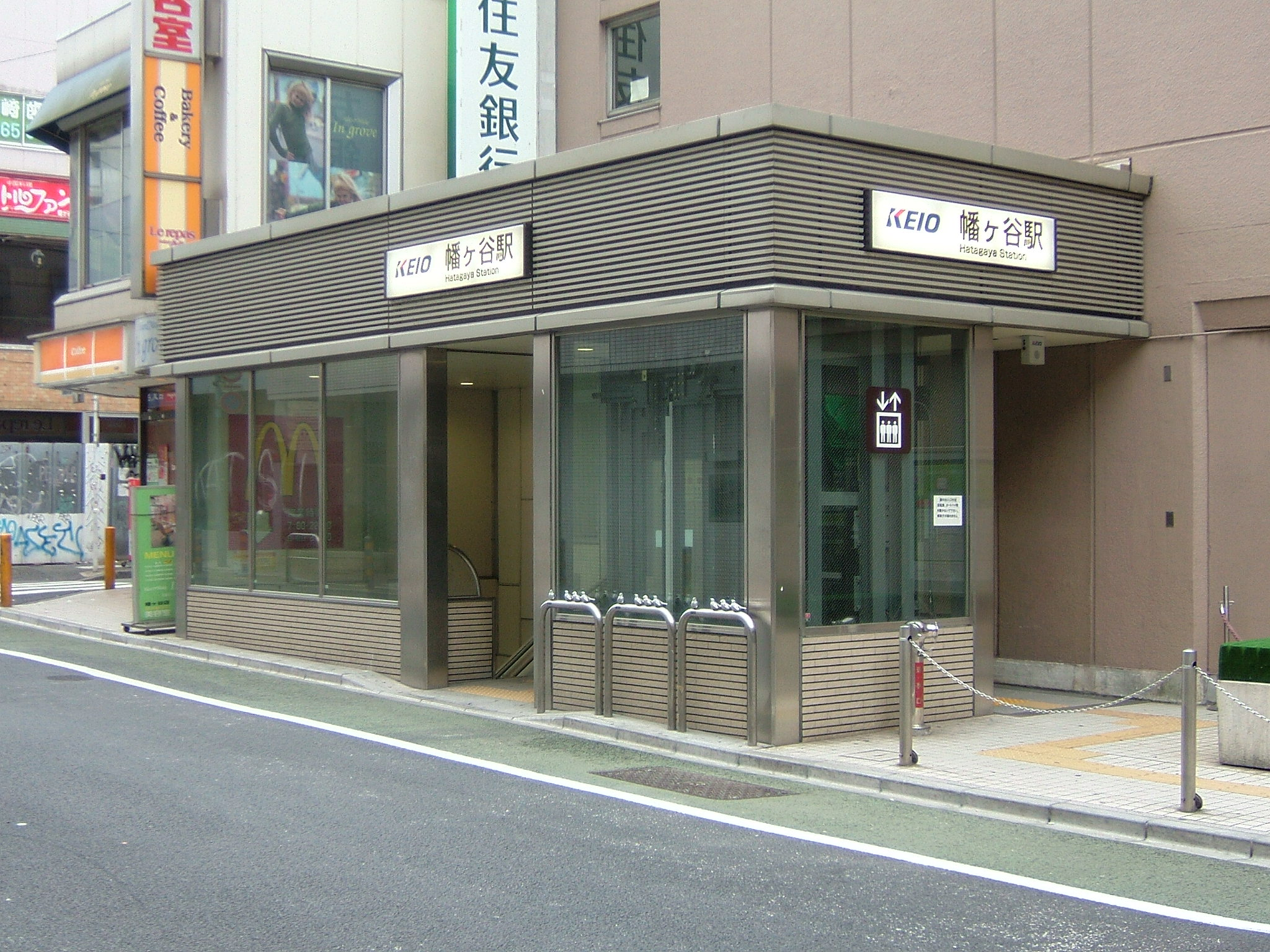
- Station entrance, 2009

General information
- Location: Shibuya, Tokyo; Japan
- Operator: Keio Corporation
- Line: Keio New Line

History
- Opened: 1913

Services
Preceding station	Keio Corporation	Following station
Sasazuka Terminus	Keiō New Line Express Semi Express Rapid Local	Hatsudai towards Shinjuku
Location

Hatagaya Station (幡ヶ谷駅, Hatagaya-eki) is a railway station on the Keio New Line in the Hatagaya district of Shibuya, Tokyo, Japan, operated by the private railway operator Keio Corporation.

== Station layout ==
Both platforms are two floors underground with side platforms on either side of the two central tracks.

=== Platforms ===
1	■ Keio New Line	Sasazuka ・ Meidaimae ・ Chōfu ・ Hashimoto
2	■ Keio New Line	Shinjuku ・(Toei Shinjuku Line) Ichigaya ・ Ōjima ・ Motoyawata

== History ==
Hatagaya Station opened on 11 October 1913. The station was moved to its present underground location on 1 November 1978.

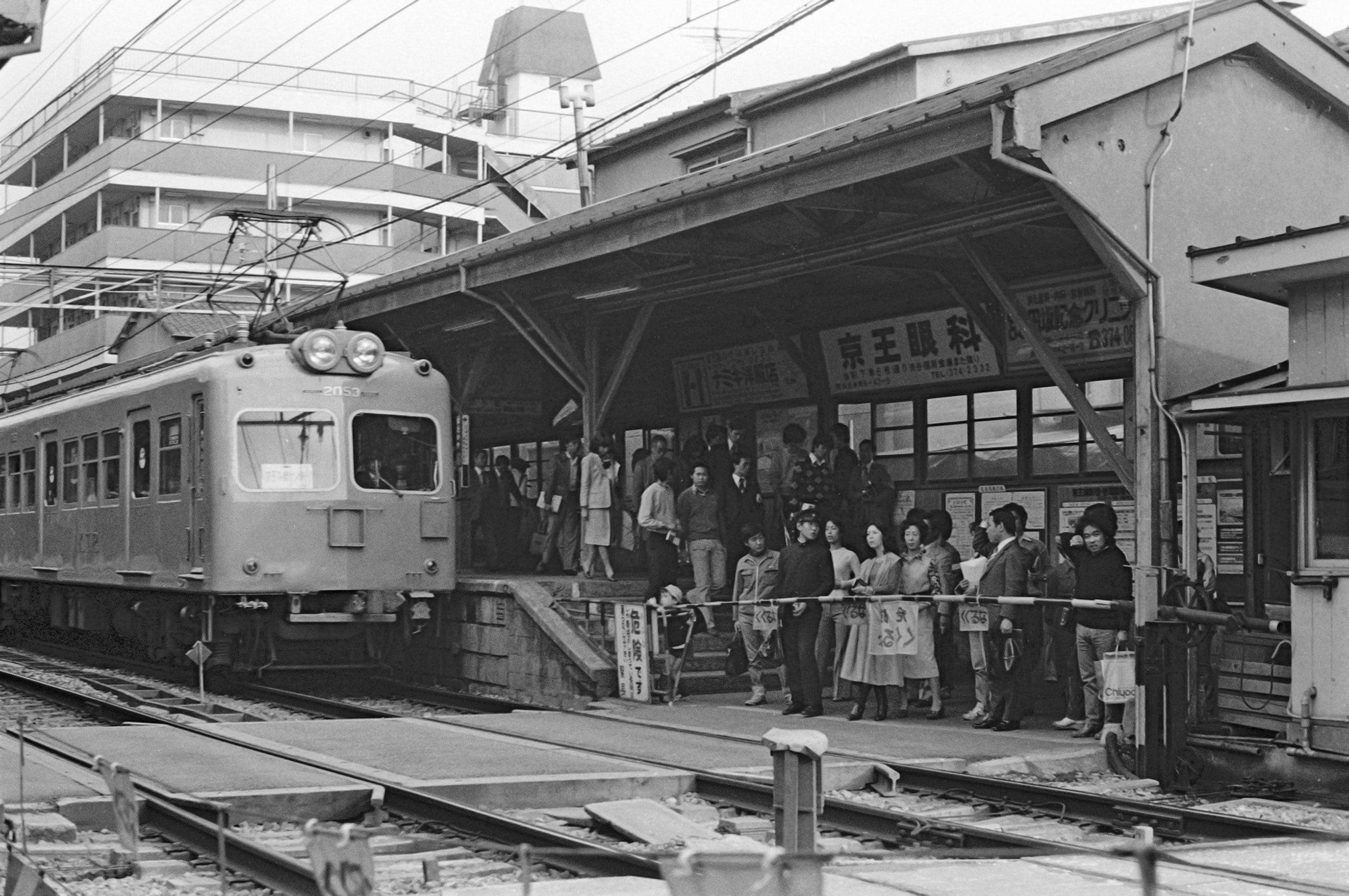
Former ground-level platforms, October 1978
