= Keiō New Line =

Railway line in Tokyo, Japan

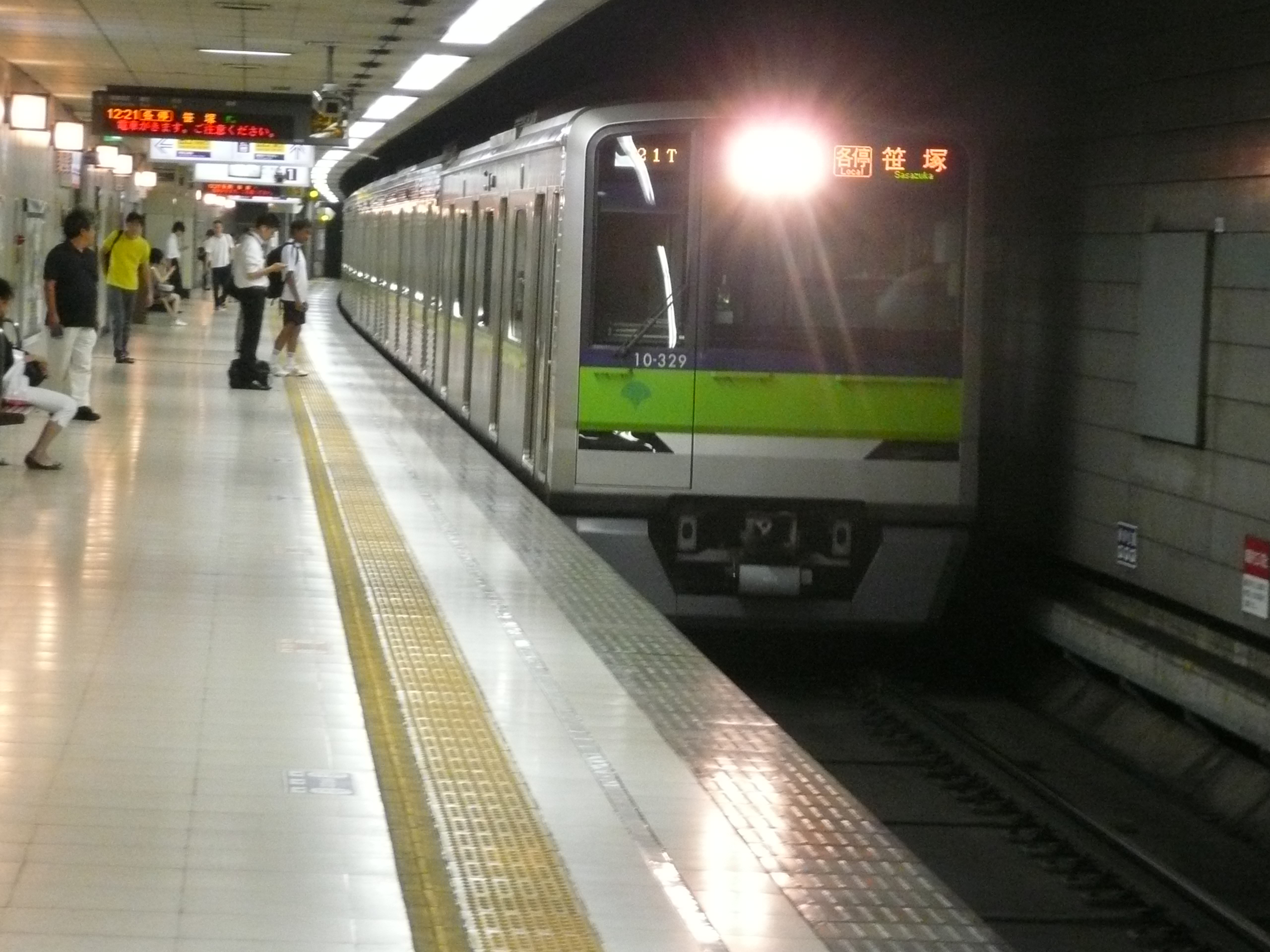
- A Toei 10-300 series train at Hatsudai Station in August 2013

Overview
- Native name: 京王新線
- Status: In service
- Owner: Keio Corporation
- Line number: KO
- Locale: Tokyo
- Termini: Shinsen Shinjuku; Sasazuka
- Stations: 4

Service
- Type: Commuter rail
- System: Keio Electric Railway
- Operator(s): Keio Corporation

History
- Opened: October 30, 1978; 47 years ago

Technical
- Line length: 3.6 km (2.2 mi)
- Number of tracks: Double-track
- Track gauge: 1,372 mm (4 ft 6 in)
- Minimum radius: 500 m (1,600 ft)
- Electrification: 1,500 V DC (Overhead line)
- Maximum incline: 3.5%

The Keio New Line (京王新線, Keiō Shinsen) is a 3.6-kilometer (2.2 mi) link which connects Keio Corporation's Keiō Line from Sasazuka Station in Shibuya to Shinjuku Station with through service on to the Shinjuku Line of the Tokyo Metropolitan Bureau of Transportation. The line opened on October 30, 1978.

== Operations ==
The Keio New Line generally parallels the main Keio Line along National Route 20 (Kōshū Kaidō) on a deeper route. Except for a short section just before Sasazuka Station, the entire line is underground.

Because the line was built to normal railway standards and not to subway standards, only specially designed trains can travel along the Keio New Line. However, since new train cars are being designed to be able to operate on above-ground and below-ground tracks there is no real issue with the differentiation. All trains operating west of Sasazuka Station start and arrive at Shinjuku Station. During events at the Tokyo Racecourse, there are express trains that operate from Fuchūkeiba-seimommae Station to Shinjuku Station.

The Keio New Line shares the same platforms with the Toei Shinjuku Line at Shinjuku Station. From here trains travel west-southwest. At Hatsudai Station, the westbound platform is two floors underground while the eastbound one is three floors underground. (Both platforms are on the north side of the station.) At Hatagaya Station both platforms are two floors underground with platforms on either side of the two central tracks. From this station, the Keio New line diverges from the Kōshū Kaidō and heads towards the Keio Line further south. The Keiō Line parallels the outside of the New Line on an elevated viaduct over Prefectural Route 420 (Nakano Dori) until Sasazuka Station.

== Stations ==
Although there are four types of trains that travel along the Keiō New Line segment (local, rapid, semi express, and express), all trains within the Keiō New Line stop at every station.

No.	Station		km	Connections	Ward
↑ Through-running to/from Shinjuku Line towards Motoyawata ↑
	Shinjuku (New Line Shinjuku)	新宿 (新線新宿)	0.0	Chūō Line (JC05); Chūō–Sōbu Line (JB10); Yamanote Line (JY17); Saikyō Line (JA11); Shōnan–Shinjuku Line (JS20); Marunouchi Line (M-08); Ōedo Line (E-27, Shinjuku-Nishiguchi: E-01); Shinjuku Line (S-01); Odawara Line (OH01); Shinjuku Line (Seibu-Shinjuku: SS01)	Shinjuku
	Hatsudai	初台	1.7		Shibuya
	Hatagaya	幡ヶ谷	2.7		Shibuya
	Sasazuka	笹塚	3.6	Keiō Line (KO04)	Shibuya
↓ Through-running to/from Keiō Line towards Hashimoto, Takaosanguchi, and Keiō-hachiōji ↓

== History ==
The Keio New Line began operation on October 30, 1978. With the completion of the last segment of the Toei Shinjuku Line, through service operations began on March 30, 1980.

== See also ==
- Keio Line
