= Bubaigawara Station =

Railway station in Fuchū, Tokyo, Japan

JN21 Bubaigawara Station 分倍河原駅

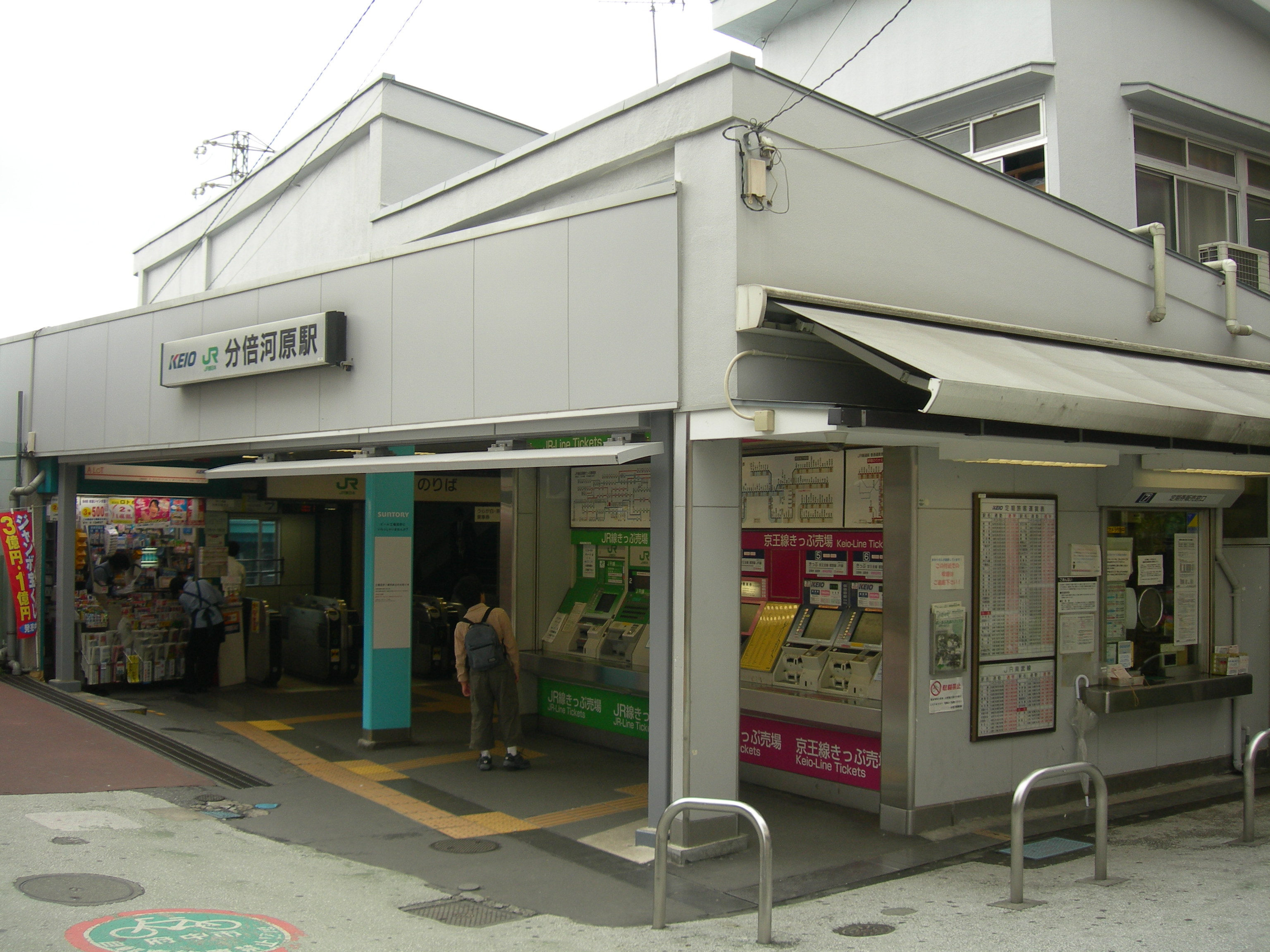
- Bubaigawara Station, June 2008

General information
- Location: 2-21-18 Katamachi, Fuchū-shi, Tokyo 183–0021; Japan
- Coordinates: 35.6684°N 139.4686°E
- Operator: JR East; Keio Corporation
- Lines: Nambu Line; Keiō Line
- Distance: 28.8 km from Kawasaki
- Platforms: 4 side platforms

Other information
- Station code: JN21 (Nambu Line); KO25 (Keio Line)
- Website: Official website

History
- Opened: 24 March 1925; 101 years ago

Passengers
- FY2019: 41,240 (JR East) daily 95,121 (Keio)

Services
Preceding station	JR East	Following station
Tachikawa JB26 Terminus	Nambu Line Rapid	Fuchū-Hommachi JB20 towards Kawasaki
Nishifu JB22 towards Tachikawa	Nambu Line Local	Fuchū-Hommachi JB20 towards Kawasaki
Preceding station	Keio Corporation	Following station
Seiseki-sakuragaoka One-way operation	Keiō Line Mt Takao	Fuchū towards Shinjuku
Seiseki-sakuragaoka towards Keiō-hachiōji	Keiō Liner	Fuchū towards Shinjuku
Seiseki-sakuragaoka towards Keiō-hachiōji	Keiō Line Special Express Express	Fuchū towards Shinjuku
Nakagawara towards Keiō-hachiōji	Keiō Line Semi Express Rapid Local	Fuchū towards Shinjuku
Location
- Location within Tokyo Location within Japan

Bubaigawara Station (分倍河原駅, Bubaigawara-eki) is an interchange passenger railway station located in the city of Fuchū, Tokyo, Japan, operated jointly by the East Japan Railway Company (JR East) and the private railway operator Keio Corporation.

== Lines ==
Bubaigawara Station is served by the Nambu Line, and is 28.8 kilometers from the Nambu Line terminus at Kawasaki Station. It is also served by the Keiō Line, and is 23.1 km from the Keio Line Tokyo terminus at Shinjuku.

== Station layout ==
The JR East and Keio Stations each have two side platforms serving two tracks. The two parts of the station share a common station building and entrance, with both JR and Keio ticket vending machines located side by side.

=== JR East platforms ===
The JR East platforms are located at ground level, running west to east.

1	Nambu Line	for Fuchū-Hommachi, Noborito, and Kawasaki
2	Nambu Line	for Yaho and Tachikawa

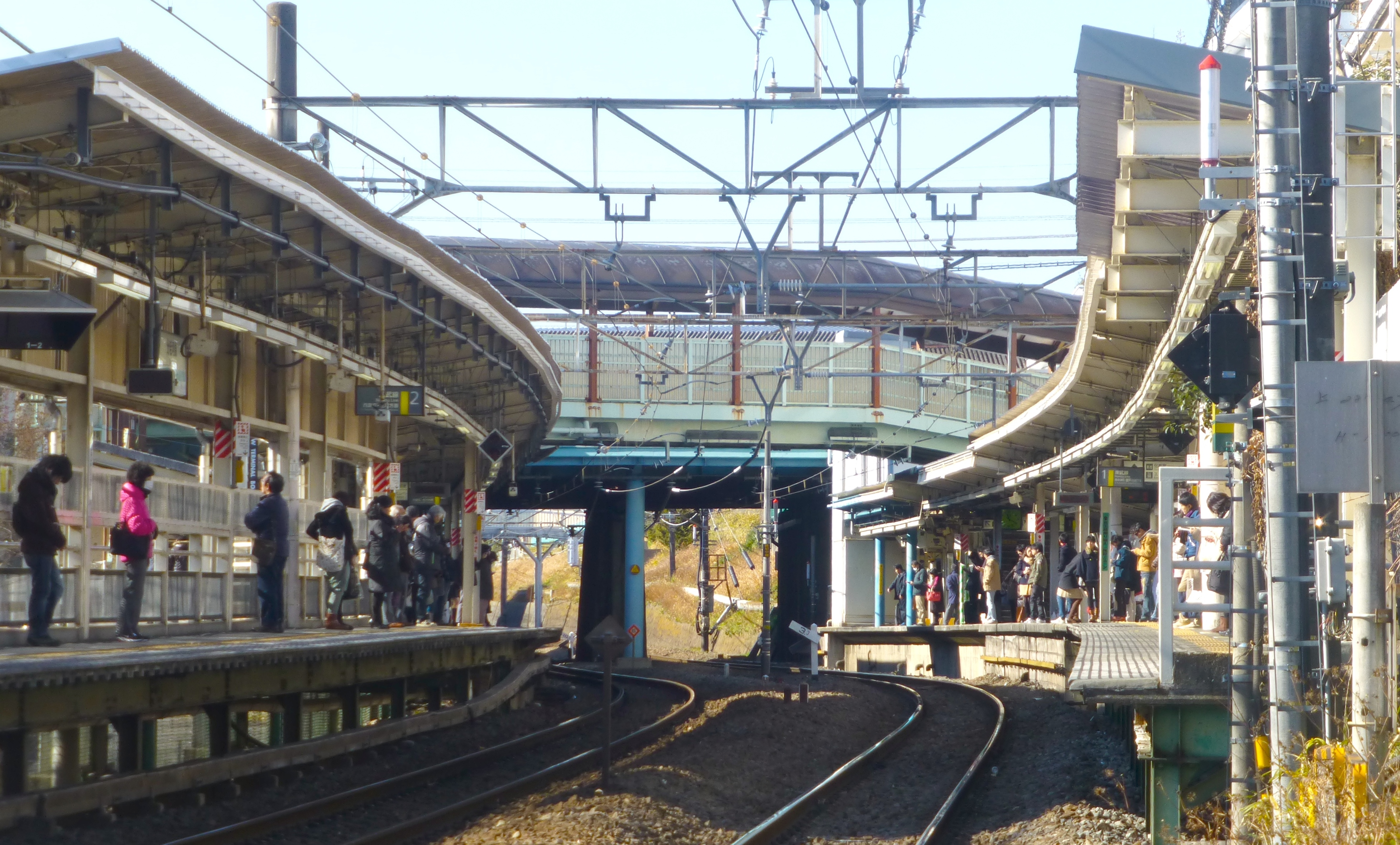
The Nambu Line platforms viewed from a level crossing to the east of the station, January 2014

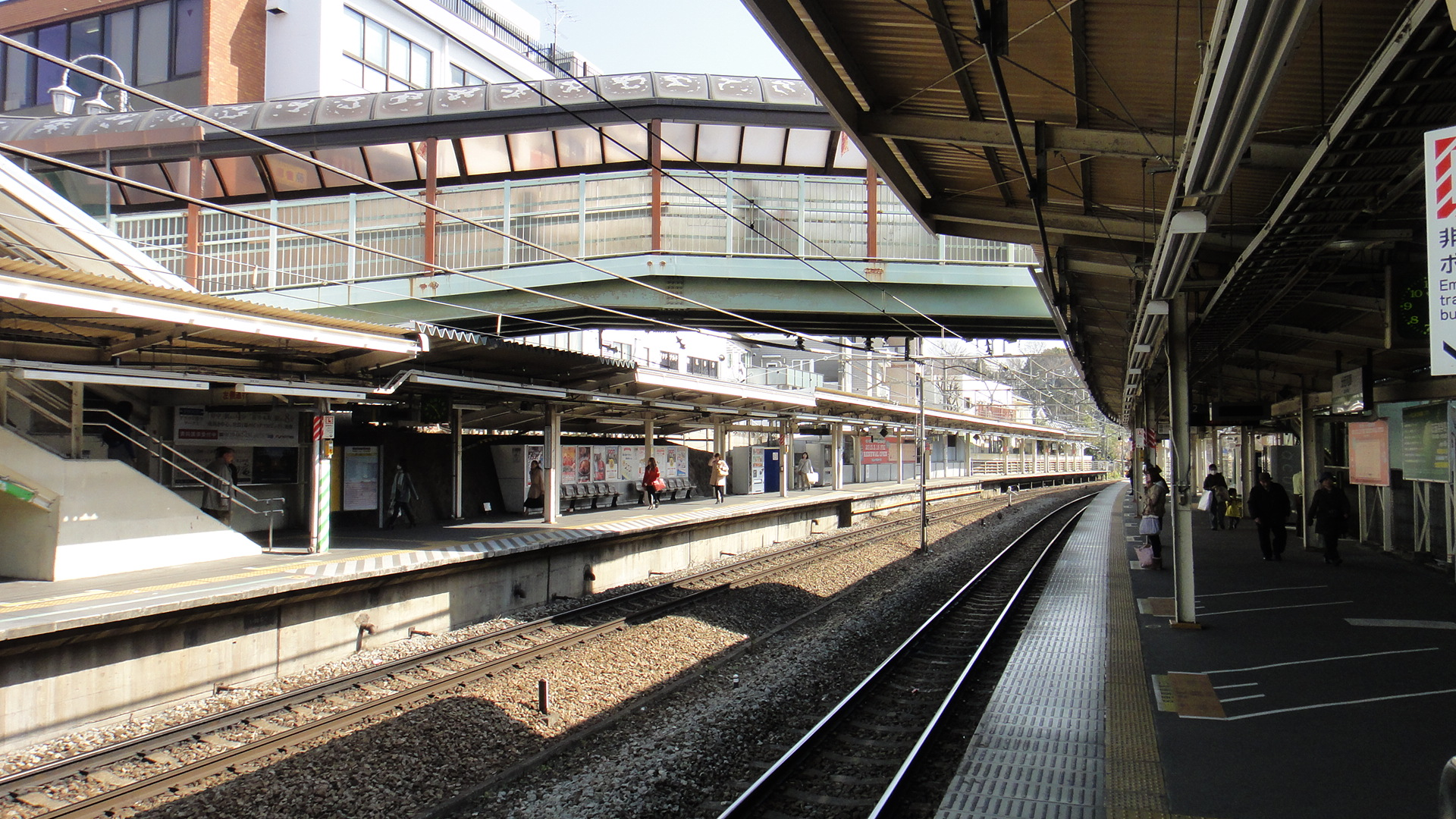
The Nambu Line platforms looking east from platform 2, March 2013

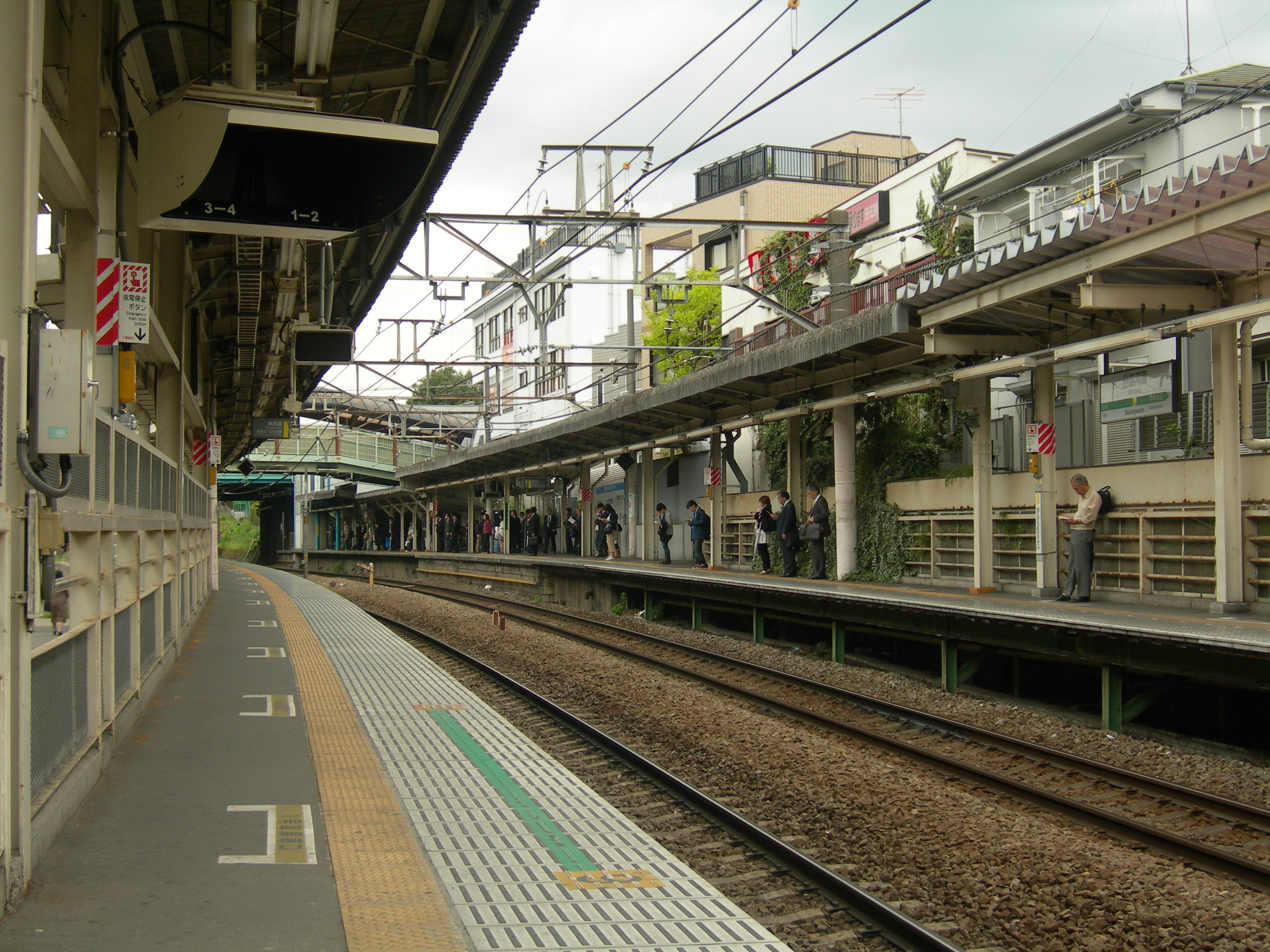
The Nambu Lines looking west from platform 2, April 2008

=== Keio platforms ===
The Keio platforms are elevated and run approximately north to south.

1	Keiō Line	for Keiō-Hachiōji; Keiō Dōbutsuen Line for Tama-Dōbutsukōen (via Takahatafudō); Keiō Takao Line for Takaosanguchi (via Kitano)
2	Keiō Line	for Chōfu, Meidaimae, Sasazuka, and Shinjuku; Toei Shinjuku Line

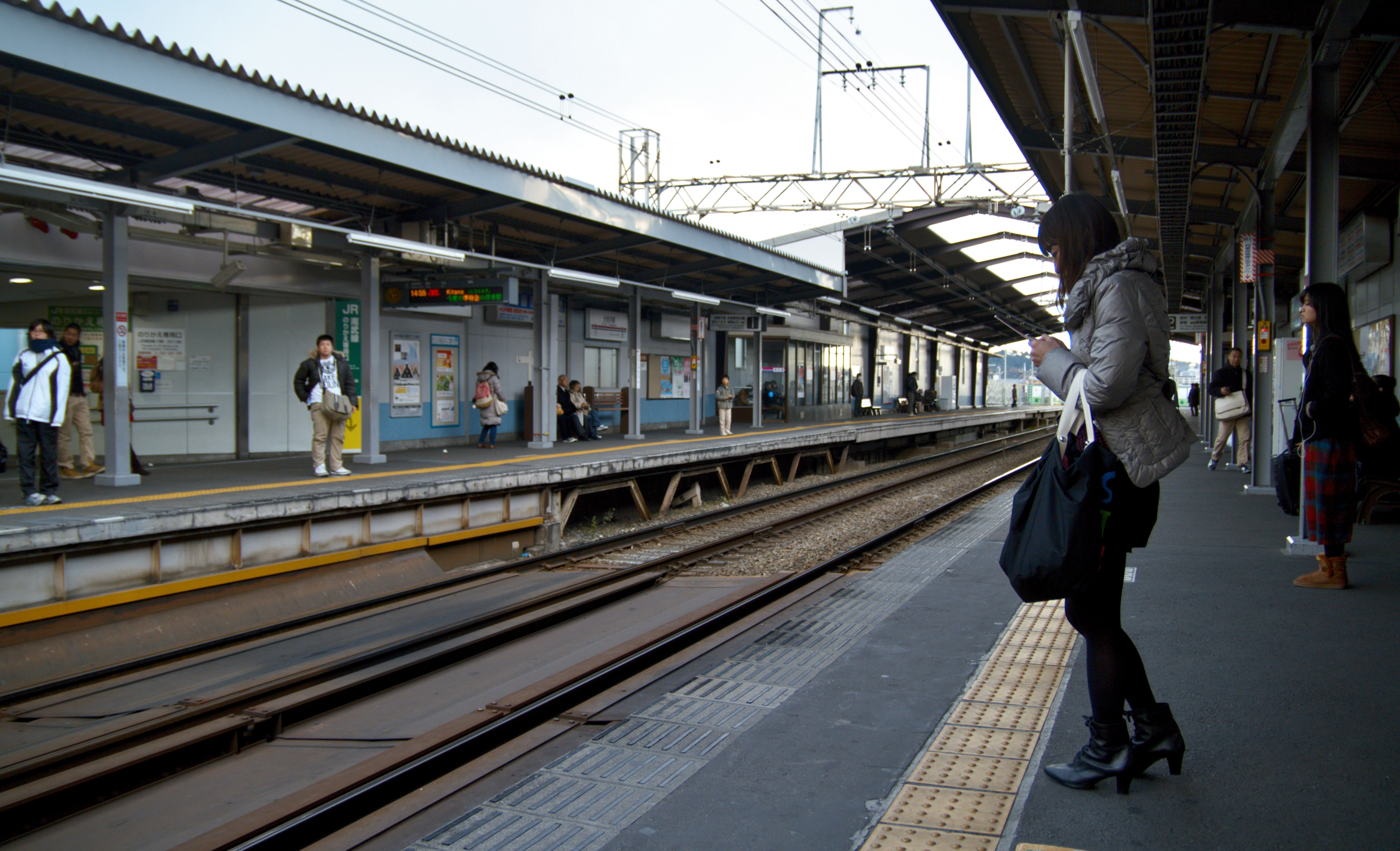
The Keio Line platforms, December 2011

== History ==
The Keio Line station opened on 24 March 1925. as Yashikibun Station (屋敷分駅). It was renamed to its present name on 11 December 1928. The JNR (now JR East) station also opened on 11 December 1928.

== Passenger statistics ==
In fiscal 2019, the JR station was used by an average of 41,240 passengers daily (boarding passengers only). During the same period, the Keio station was used by an average of 95,121 passengers daily.

The passenger figures (boarding passengers only) for previous years are as shown below.

Fiscal year	Keio Daily average	JR daily average
2005	75,792	35,970
2010	84,516	37,739
2015	90,754	40,036

== Surrounding area ==
- MINANO (shopping center)
- Toshiba Fuchu Office
- Toshiba Digital Solutions
- Fuchu Katamachi Post Office

== See also ==
- List of railway stations in Japan
