= Tobitakyū Station =

Railway station in Chōfu, Tokyo, Japan

Tobitakyū Station 飛田給駅

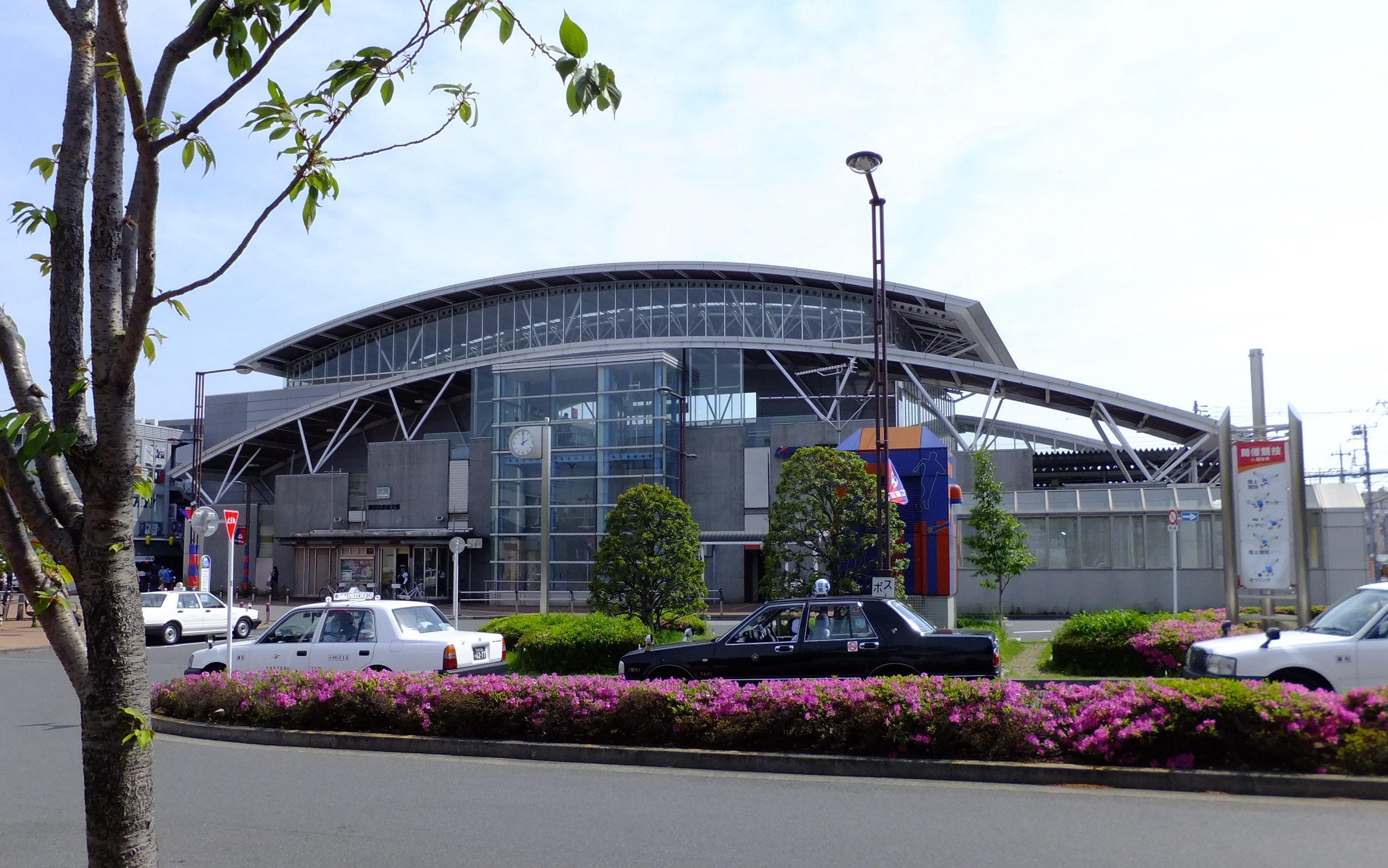
- Tobitakyū Station north exit, May 2013

General information
- Location: 1-42-11 Tobitakyū, Chōfu-shi, Tokyo 182-0036); Japan
- Coordinates: 35°39′37″N 139°31′24″E
- Operator: Keio Corporation
- Line: Keio Line
- Distance: 17.7 km from Shinjuku
- Platforms: 1 side platform +1 island platform
- Tracks: 3

Other information
- Station code: KO20
- Website: Official website

History
- Opened: 1 September 1916; 109 years ago

Passengers
- FY2019: 28,284

Services
Preceding station	Keio Corporation	Following station
Musashinodai towards Keiō-hachiōji	Keiō Line Rapid Local	Nishi-chōfu towards Shinjuku
Location
- Location within Tokyo Location within Japan

Tobitakyū Station (飛田給駅, Tobitakyū-eki) is a passenger railway station located in the city of Chōfu, Tokyo, Japan, operated by the private railway operator Keio Corporation. It serves as the main train station for access to Ajinomoto Stadium, home of J. League football teams F.C. Tokyo and Tokyo Verdy.

== Lines ==
Tobitakyū Station is served by the Keiō Line, and is located 17.7 kilometers from the starting point of the line at Shinjuku Station.

Rapid and Local trains stop at the station regularly. During events at Ajinomoto Stadium, service is extended to Semi Express, Express, and Special Express trains to provide access to the facility.

== Station layout ==
This station has a side platform and an island platform with an elevated station building.

=== Platforms ===
1	Keiō Line	for Keiō-hachiōji; Keiō Dōbutsuen Line for Tama-dōbutsukōen (via Takahatafudō); Keiō Takao Line for Takaosanguchi (via Kitano)
2, 3	Keiō Line	for Chōfu, Meidaimae, Sasazuka, and Shinjuku; Toei Shinjuku Line for Motoyawata

== History ==
The station opened on 1 September 1916.

== Passenger statistics ==
In fiscal 2019, the station was used by an average of 28,284 passengers daily.

The passenger figures (boarding passengers only) for previous years are as shown below.

Fiscal year	daily average
2005	20,888
2010	23,467
2015	24,618

== Surrounding area ==
- Ajinomoto Stadium

== See also ==
- List of railway stations in Japan
