= Fuda Station =

Railway station in Chōfu, Tokyo, Japan

Fuda Station 布田駅

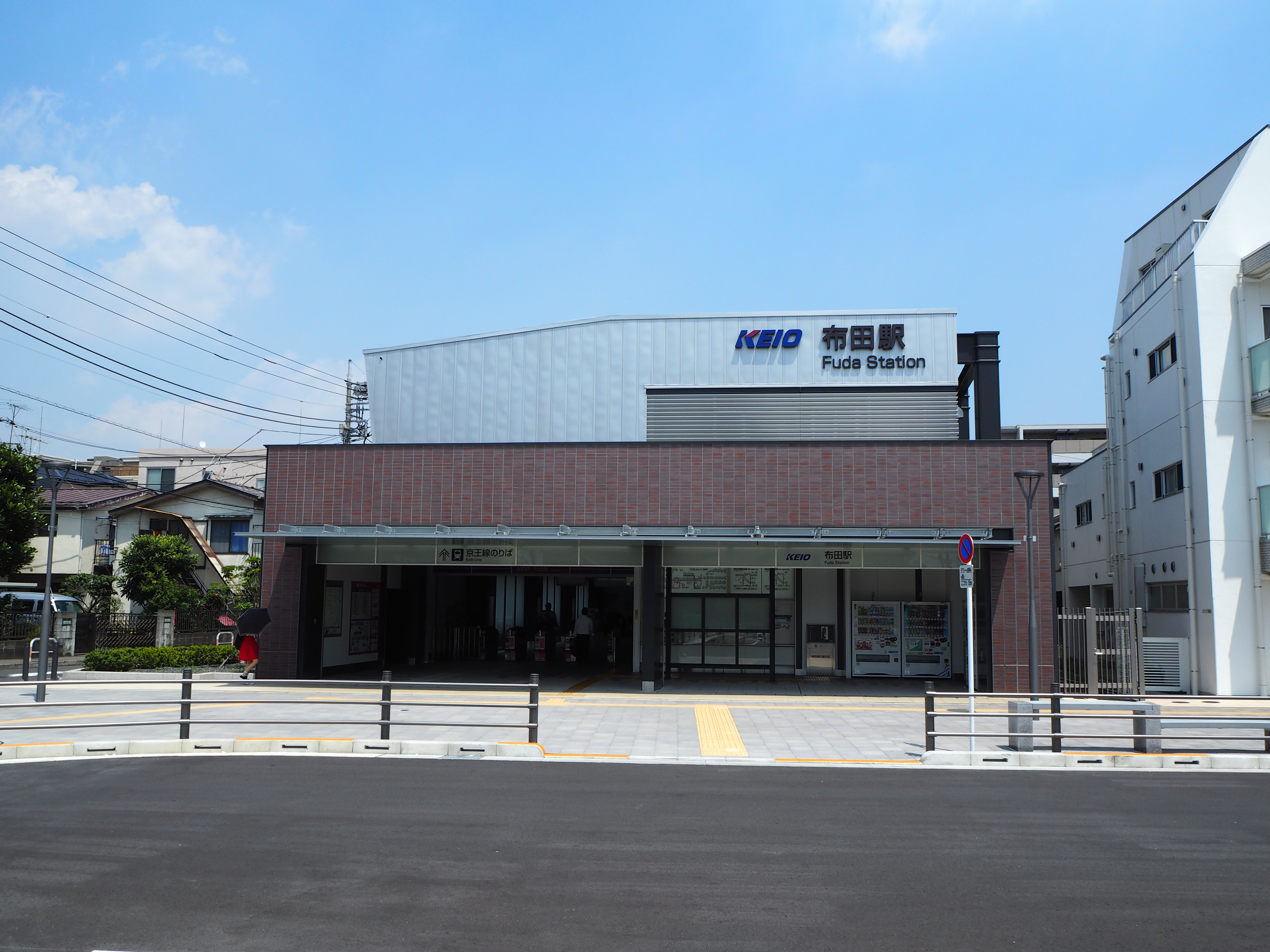
- Fuda Station, July 2015

General information
- Location: 5-67 Kokuryō-cho, Chōfu-shi, Tokyo182-0022; Japan
- Coordinates: 35°38′59.881″N 139°33′4.1″E
- Operator: Keio Corporation
- Line: Keio Line
- Distance: 14.9 km from Shinjuku
- Platforms: 1 island platform
- Tracks: 2

Other information
- Station code: KO17
- Website: Official website

History
- Opened: 1917; 109 years ago

Passengers
- FY2019: 16,784

Services
Preceding station	Keio Corporation	Following station
Chōfu towards Keiō-hachiōji	Keiō Line Local	Kokuryō towards Shinjuku
Location
- Location within Tokyo Location within Japan

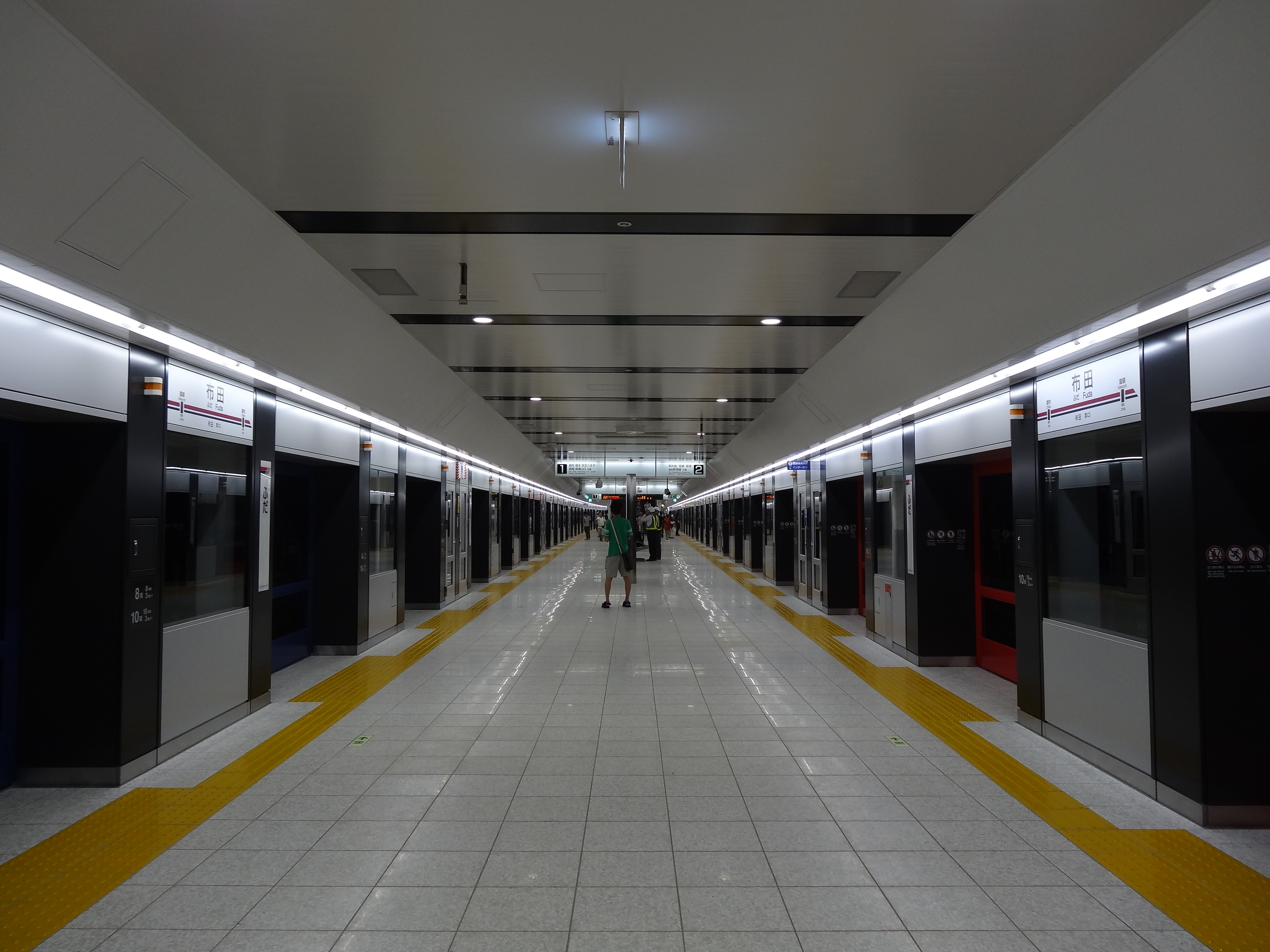
Platform of Fuda Station (August 2012)

Fuda Station (布田駅, Fuda-eki) is a passenger railway station located in the city of Chōfu, Tokyo, Japan, operated by the private railway operator Keio Corporation.

== Lines ==
Fuda Station is served by the Keio Line, and is located 14.9 kilometers from the starting point of the line at Shinjuku Station.

== Station layout ==
This station consists of one underground island platform serving two tracks, with the station building located above The underground tracks opened on August 19, 2012 replacing the ground-level tracks. The platform is equipped with automatic platform screen doors.

=== Platforms ===
1	Keiō Line	for Chōfu and Keiō-Hachiōji; Keiō Sagamihara Line for Hashimoto (via Chōfu); Keiō Takao Line for Takaosanguchi (via Kitano)
2	Keiō Line	for Meidaimae, Sasazuka, and Shinjuku; Keiō New Line for Shinjuku; Toei Shinjuku Line for Moto-Yawata

== History ==
The station opened in 1917, and was relocated to its present location in 1927. It was rebuilt as an underground station in 2012.

== Passenger statistics ==
In fiscal 2019, the station was used by an average of 16,784 passengers daily.

The passenger figures (boarding passengers only) for previous years are as shown below.

Fiscal year	daily average
2005	14,913
2010	15,573
2015	16,466

== Surrounding area ==
- Kokuryō Shrine
- Tamagawa Hospital

== See also ==
- List of railway stations in Japan
