= Seiseki-sakuragaoka Station =

Railway station in Tama, Tokyo, Japan

Seiseki-sakuragaoka Station 聖蹟桜ヶ丘駅

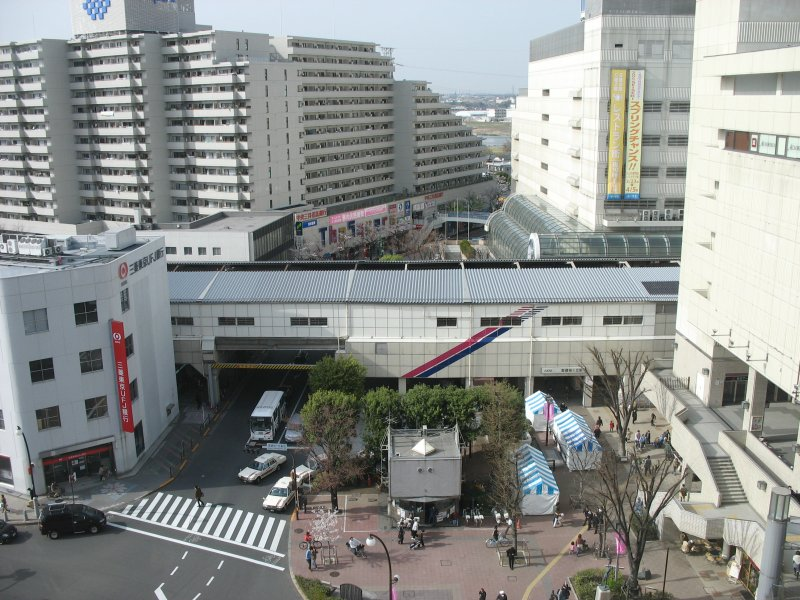
- Seiseki-sakuragaoka Station, April 2006

General information
- Location: 1-10-10 Sekido, Tama-shi, Tokyo-to 206-0011; Japan
- Coordinates: 35.6507°N 139.4470°E
- Operator: Keio Corporation
- Line: Keio Line
- Distance: 26.3 km from Shinjuku
- Platforms: 2 side platforms
- Tracks: 2

Construction
- Structure type: Elevated
- Accessible: Yes

Other information
- Status: Staffed
- Station code: KO27
- Website: Official website

History
- Opened: 24 March 1925; 101 years ago
- Former names: Sekido (until 1937)

Passengers
- FY2019: 65,246

Services
Preceding station	Keio Corporation	Following station
Takahatafudō One-way operation	Keiō Line Mt Takao	Bubaigawara towards Shinjuku
Takahatafudō towards Keiō-hachiōji	Keiō Liner	Bubaigawara towards Shinjuku
Takahatafudō towards Keiō-hachiōji	Keiō Line Special Express Express	Bubaigawara towards Shinjuku
Mogusaen towards Keiō-hachiōji	Keiō Line Semi Express Rapid Local	Nakagawara towards Shinjuku
Location
- Location within Tokyo Location within Japan

Seiseki-sakuragaoka Station (聖蹟桜ヶ丘駅, Seiseki-sakuragaoka-eki) is a passenger railway station located in the city of Tama, Tokyo, Japan, operated by the private railway operator Keiō Corporation.

== Lines and services ==
Seiseki-sakuragaoka Station is on the Keiō Line, and is located 26.3 kilometers from the starting point of the line at Shinjuku Station. All Keiō Line services stop at the station. Along with Tama Center Station, it is one of the main gateways to the Tama New Town development.

== Station layout ==
The station has two elevated opposed side platforms.

=== Platforms ===
1	Keiō Line	for Keiō-Hachiōji; Keiō Dōbutsuen Line for Tama-Dōbutsukōen (via Takahatafudō); Keiō Takao Line for Takaosanguchi (via Kitano)
2	Keiō Line	for Chōfu, Meidaimae, Sasazuka, and Shinjuku; Toei Shinjuku Line

== History ==
The station first opened on 24 March 1925 as Sekido Station (関戸駅). It was renamed Seiseki-sakuragaoka Station on 1 May 1937.

== Passenger statistics ==
In fiscal 2019, the station was used by an average of 65,246 passengers daily.

== Surrounding area ==
There are several commercial complexes, including a Keio Department Store, built around the station, as well as Keio's head office. There is a bus terminal to the north of the station.

== In popular culture ==
The station is frequented in Studio Ghibli's 1995 film Whisper of the Heart, though it was portrayed as more developed than it was during the film.

There is a dedicated map following the film in addition to a miniature replica antique store postbox where passerby's can insert their dreams and goals.

== See also ==
- List of railway stations in Japan
