= Kokuryō Station =

Railway station in Chōfu, Tokyo, Japan

Kokuryō Station 国領駅

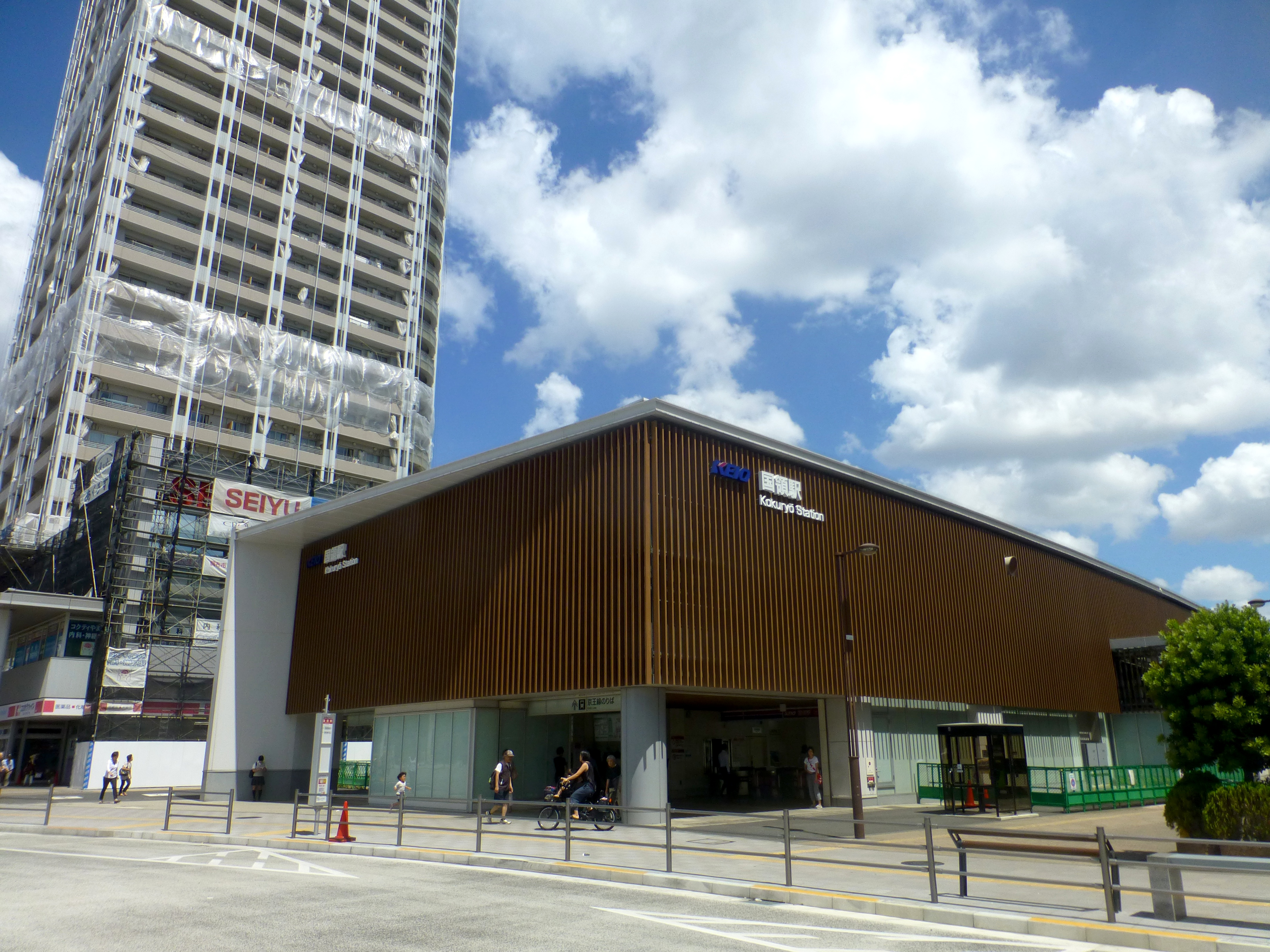
- Kokuryō Station in August 2016

General information
- Location: 3-18 Kokuryō-cho, Chōfu-shi, Tokyo 182-0022; Japan
- Coordinates: 35°39′2.372″N 139°33′29.635″E
- Operator: Keio Corporation
- Line: Keio Line
- Distance: 14.2 km from Shinjuku
- Platforms: 1 island platform
- Tracks: 2

Other information
- Station code: KO16
- Website: Official website

History
- Opened: April 15, 1913; 113 years ago
- Rebuilt: 2012

Passengers
- FY2019: 38,713 (daily)

Services
Preceding station	Keio Corporation	Following station
Fuda towards Keiō-hachiōji	Keiō Line Local	Shibasaki towards Shinjuku
Location
- Location within Tokyo Location within Japan

Kokuryō Station (国領駅, Kokuryō-eki) is a passenger railway station located in the city of Chōfu, Tokyo, Japan, operated by the private railway operator Keio Corporation.

== Lines ==
Kokuryō Station is served by the Keio Line, and is located 14.2 kilometers from the starting point of the line at Shinjuku Station.

== Station layout ==
This station consists of one underground island platforms serving two tracks, with the station building located above. The underground tracks opened on August 19, 2012, replacing the ground-level tracks.

=== Platforms ===
1	Keiō Line	for Chōfu and Keiō-hachiōji; Keiō Sagamihara Line for Hashimoto (via Chōfu); Keiō Takao Line for Takaosanguchi (via Kitano)
2	Keiō Line	for Meidaimae, Sasazuka, and Shinjuku; Keiō New Line for Shinjuku; Toei Shinjuku Line for Moto-Yawata

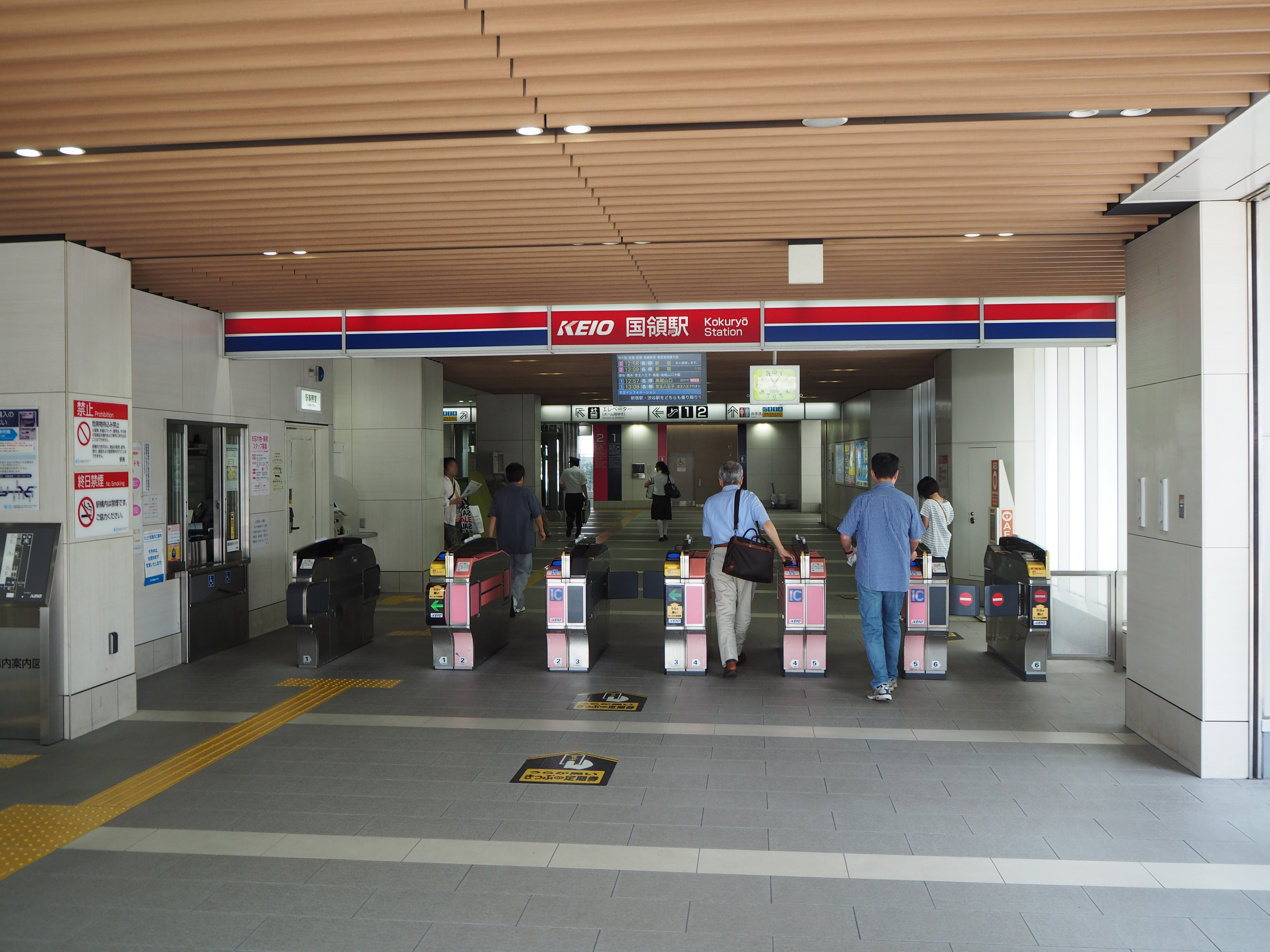
The ticket barriers in July 2015

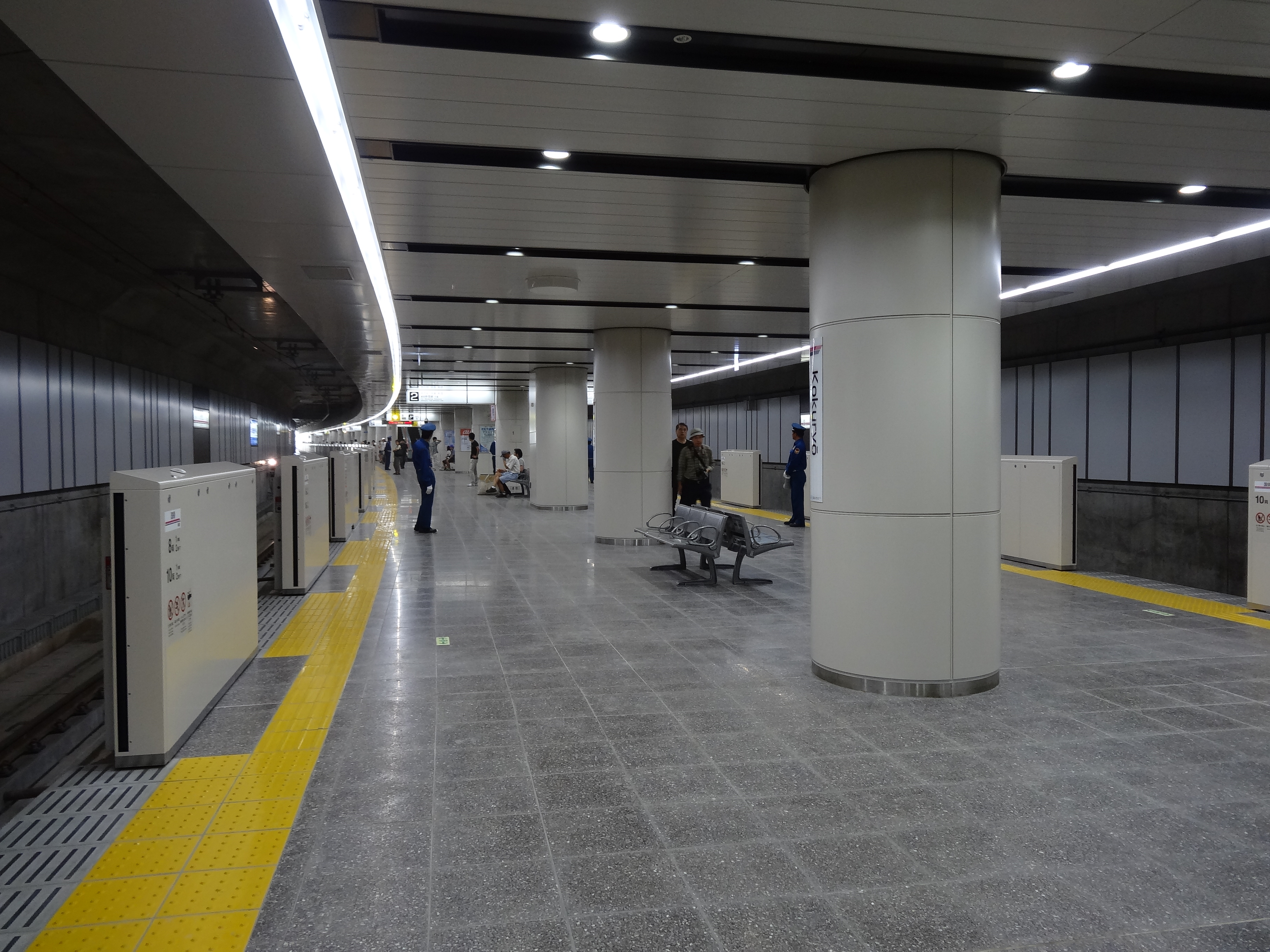
The underground platforms in August 2012 shortly after opening

== History ==
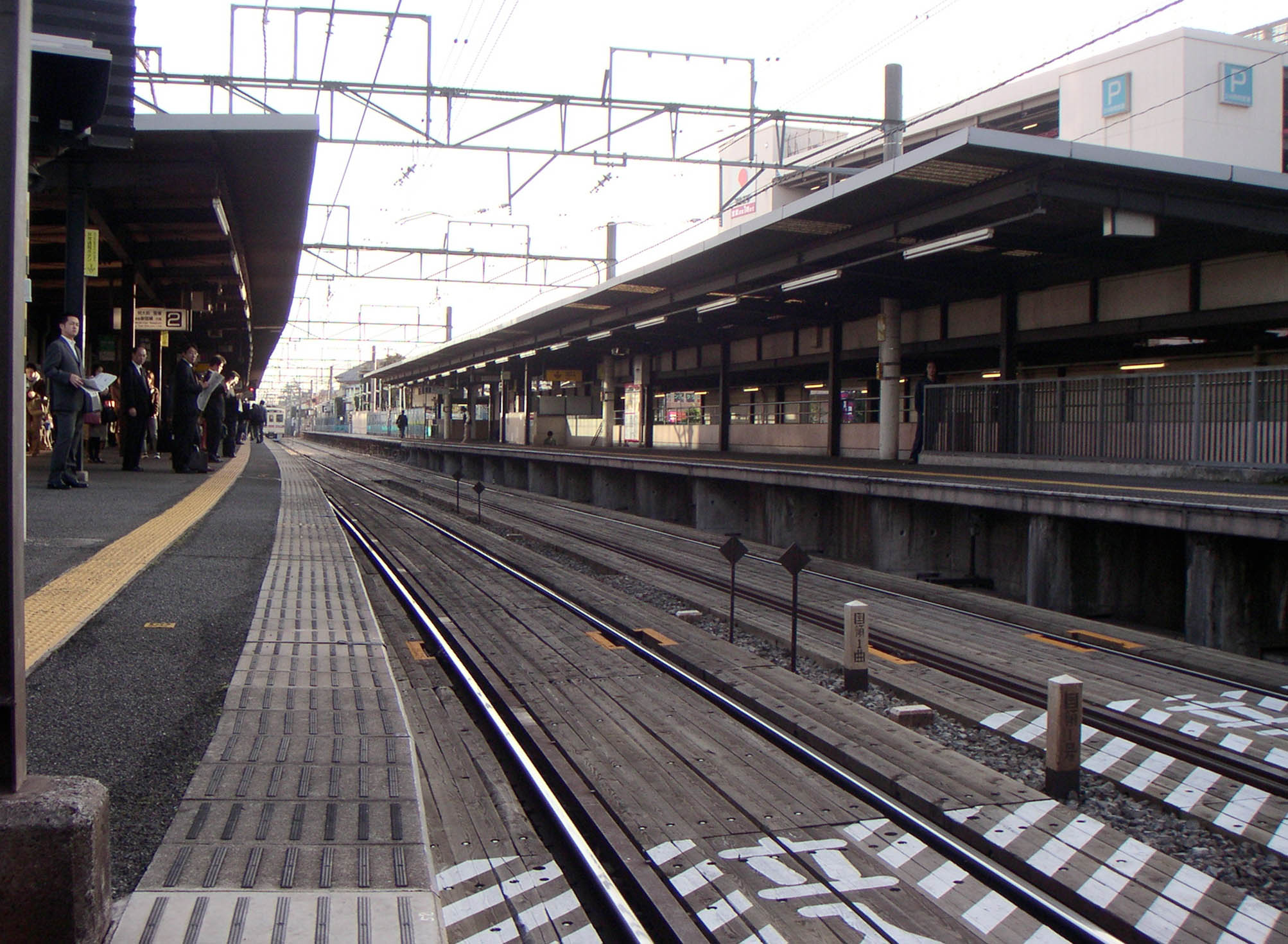
The ground-level platforms in 2005 before rebuilding

The station opened on April 15, 1913, and relocated to its present location on December 17, 1927. The station was rebuilt as an underground station in 2012.

== Passenger statistics ==
In fiscal 2019, the station was used by an average of 38,713 passengers daily.

The passenger figures (boarding passengers only) for previous years are as shown below.

Fiscal year	daily average
2005	35,086
2010	37,745
2015	38,666

== Surrounding area ==
- National Route 20
- Chōfu Post Office

== See also ==
- List of railway stations in Japan
