= Nakagawara Station (Tokyo) =

Railway station in Fuchū, Tokyo, Japan

Nakagawara Station 中河原駅

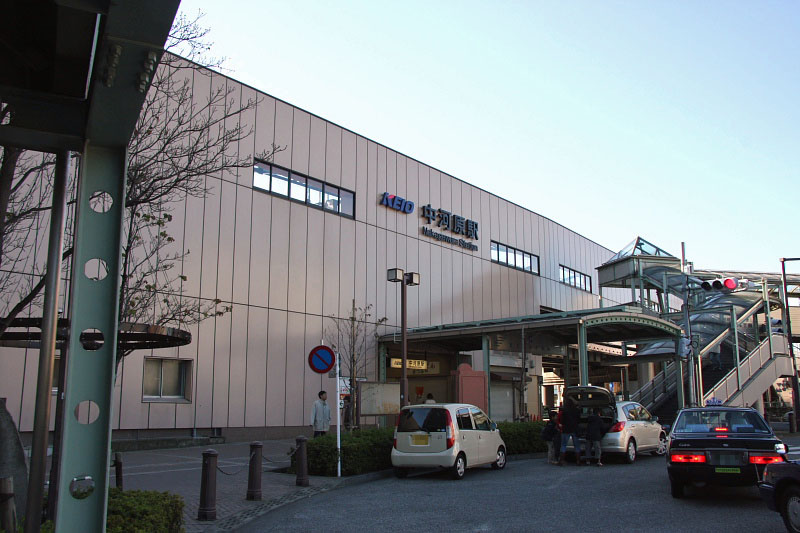
- Nakagawara Station, September 2013

General information
- Location: 2-1-16 Sumiyoshi-cho, Fuchū-shi, Tokyo 183-0034; Japan
- Coordinates: 35.6597°N 139.4576°E
- Operator: Keio Corporation
- Line: Keio Line
- Distance: 24.7 km from Shinjuku
- Platforms: 2 side platforms
- Tracks: 2

Construction
- Structure type: Elevated
- Accessible: Yes

Other information
- Status: Staffed
- Station code: KO26
- Website: Official website

History
- Opened: 24 March 1925; 101 years ago

Passengers
- FY2019: 25,845 (daily)

Services
Preceding station	Keio Corporation	Following station
Seiseki-sakuragaoka towards Keiō-hachiōji	Keiō Line Semi Express Rapid Local	Bubaigawara towards Shinjuku
Location
- Location within Tokyo Location within Japan

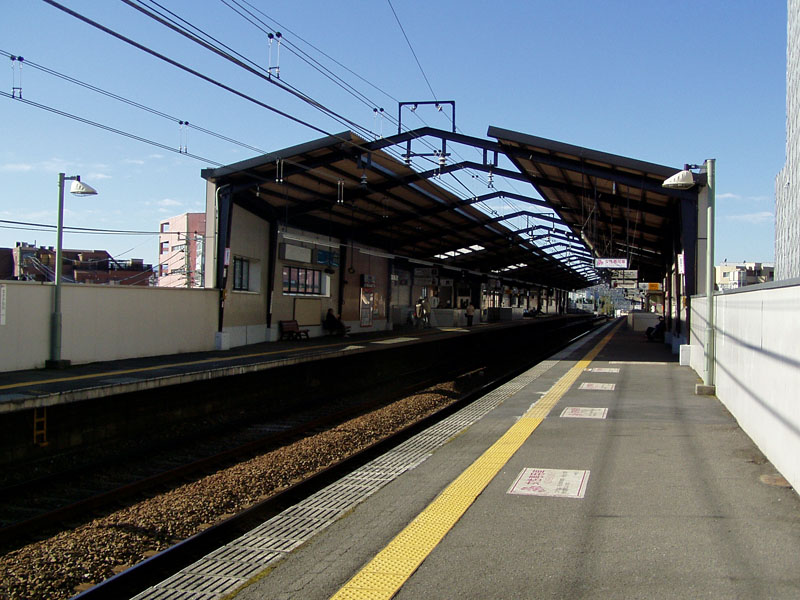
The platforms January 2008

Nakagawara Station (中河原駅, Nakagawara-eki) is a passenger railway station located in the city of Fuchū, Tokyo, Japan, operated by the private railway operator Keio Corporation.

== Lines ==
Nakagawara Station is served by the Keio Line, and is located 24.7 kilometers from the starting point of the line at Shinjuku Station.

== Station layout ==
This station consists of two elevated opposed side platforms serving two tracks, with the station building located underneath.

=== Platforms ===
1	Keiō Line	for Keiō-Hachiōji; Keiō Dōbutsuen Line for Tama-Dōbutsukōen (via Takahatafudō); Keiō Takao Line for Takaosanguchi (via Kitano)
2	Keiō Line	for Chōfu, Meidaimae, Sasazuka, and Shinjuku; Toei Shinjuku Line

== History ==
The station opened on March 24, 1925. A new station building was completed in July 1974.

== Passenger statistics ==
In fiscal 2019, the station was used by an average of 25,845 passengers daily.

The passenger figures (boarding passengers only) for previous years are as shown below.

Fiscal year	daily average
2005	26,024
2010	24,952
2015	25,539

== Surrounding area ==
- Nakagawara Post Office

== See also ==
- List of railway stations in Japan
