= Mogusaen Station =

Railway station in Hino, Tokyo, Japan

Mogusaen Station 百草園駅

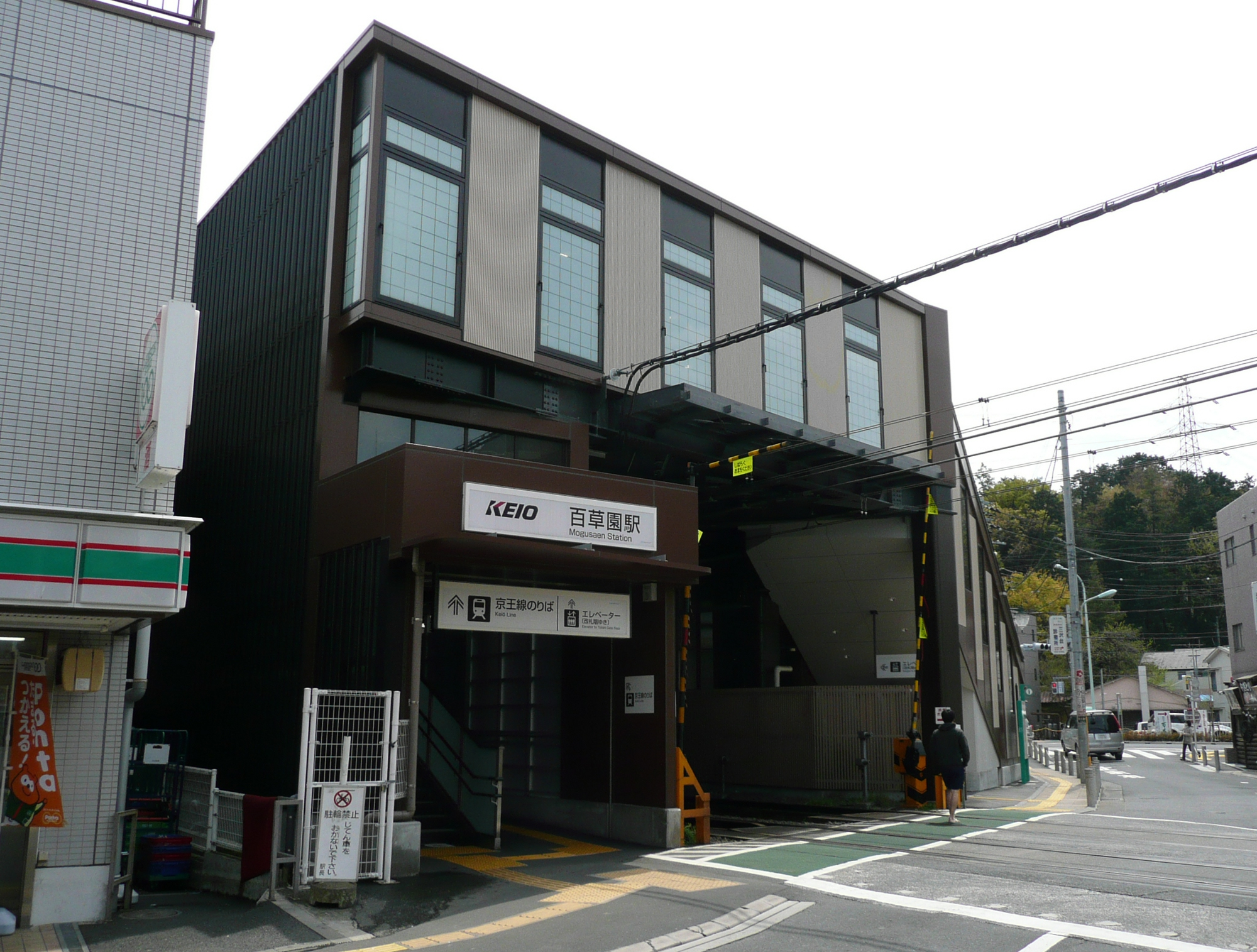
- Mogusaen Station, April 2012

General information
- Location: 209 Mogusa, Hino-shi, Tokyo 191-0034; Japan
- Coordinates: 35.6574°N 139.4312°E
- Operator: Keio Corporation
- Line: Keio Line
- Distance: 28.0 km from Shinjuku
- Platforms: 2 side platforms
- Tracks: 2

Other information
- Station code: KO28
- Website: Official website

History
- Opened: March 24, 1925; 101 years ago
- Former names: Mogusa Station (to 1937)

Passengers
- FY2019: 7,620

Services
Preceding station	Keio Corporation	Following station
Takahatafudō towards Keiō-hachiōji	Keiō Line Semi Express Rapid Local	Seiseki-sakuragaoka towards Shinjuku
Location
- Location within Tokyo Location within Japan

Mogusaen Station (百草園駅, Mogusaen-eki) is a passenger railway station located in the city of Hino, Tokyo, Japan, operated by the private railway company, Keio Corporation.

== Lines ==
Mogusanen Station is served by the Keio Line, and is located 28.0 kilometers from the starting point of the line at Shinjuku Station.

== Station layout ==
This station consists of two opposed ground-level side platforms serving two tracks, with the station building located above and at a right angle to the tracks and platforms.

=== Platforms ===
1	Keiō Line	for Keiō-Hachiōji; Keiō Dōbutsuen Line for Tama-Dōbutsukōen (via Takahatafudō); Keiō Takao Line for Takaosanguchi (via Kitano)
2	Keiō Line	for Chōfu, Meidaimae, Sasazuka, and Shinjuku; Toei Shinjuku Line

== History ==
The station opened on March 24, 1925 as Mogusa Station (百草駅). It was renamed to its present name on May 1, 1937. A new station building was completed in 2007.

== Passenger statistics ==
In fiscal 2019, the station was used by an average of 7,620 passengers daily.

The passenger figures for previous years are as shown below.

Fiscal year	Daily average
2005	7,933
2010	7,627
2015	7,919

== Surrounding area ==
- Mogusaen
- Hino City Mogusa Library
- Mogusaen Station Post Office

== See also ==
- List of railway stations in Japan
