= Nakagawara Station =

Nakagawara Station is the name of two train stations in Japan:

- Nakagawara Station (Mie) (中川原駅)
- Nakagawara Station (Tokyo) (中河原駅)
