= Keiō Line =

Commuter railway line in Tokyo, Japan

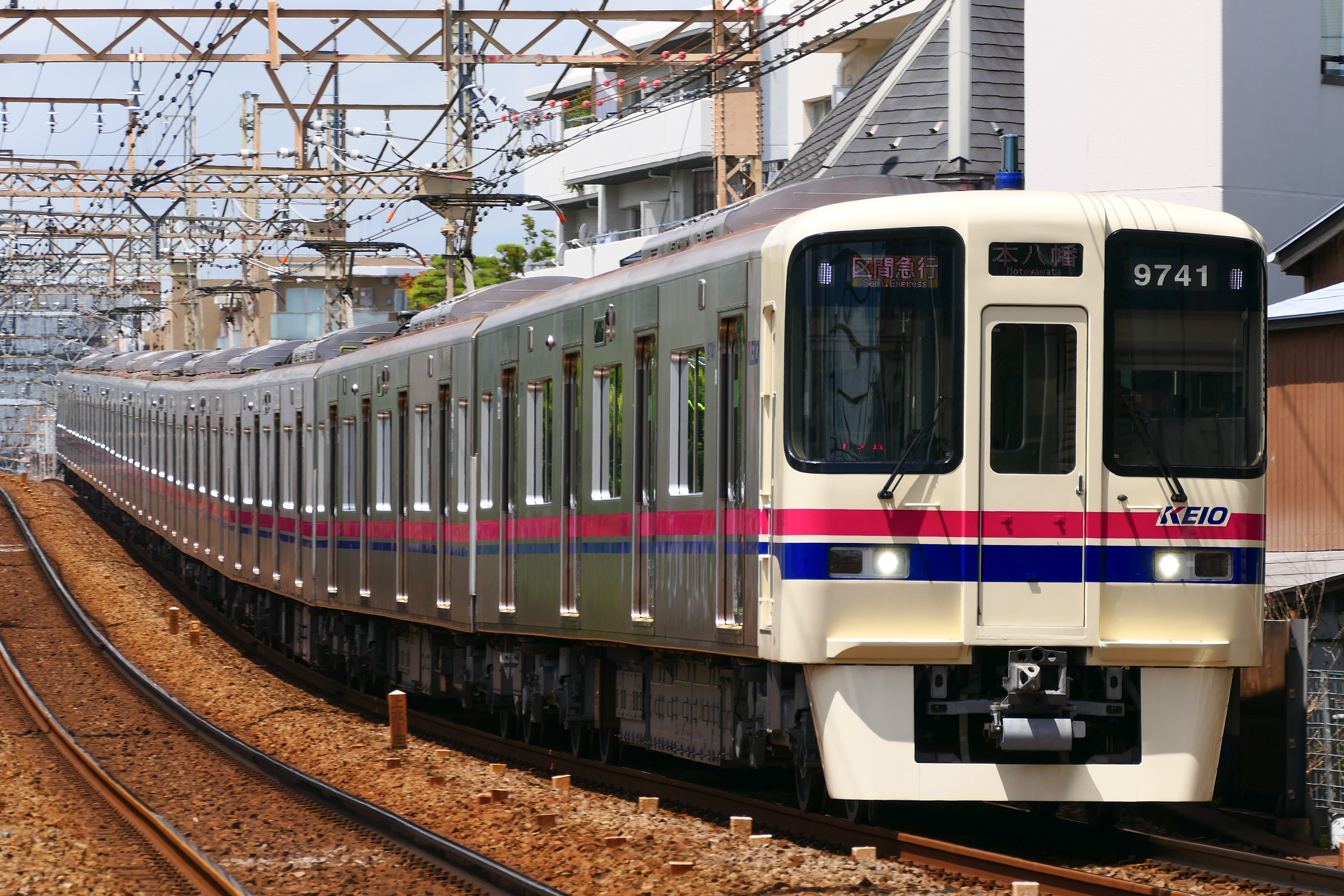
- A Keio 9000 series EMU on the Keiō Line in August 2023

Overview
- Native name: 京王線
- Status: In service
- Owner: Keio Corporation
- Locale: Tokyo
- Termini: Shinjuku; Keiō-Hachiōji
- Stations: 32
- Website: www.keio.co.jp

Service
- Type: Commuter rail
- System: Keio Electric Railway
- Route number: KO
- Rolling stock: Keio 2000, 5000, 7000, 8000 and 9000 series Toei 10-300 series
- Daily ridership: 1,349,238 (daily, 2010)

History
- Opened: 15 April 1913; 113 years ago
- Last extension: 24 March 1925; 101 years ago

Technical
- Line length: 37.9 km (23.5 mi)
- Track gauge: 1,372 mm (4 ft 6 in)
- Minimum radius: 110 m (360 ft)
- Electrification: Overhead line, 1,500 V DC
- Operating speed: 110 km/h (70 mph)
- Train protection system: Keio ATC
- Maximum incline: 3.5% (Between Hatagaya and Sasazuka)

The Keiō Line (京王線, Keiō-sen) is a 37.9-kilometer (23.5 mi) railway line in western Tokyo, Japan, owned by the private railway operator Keiō Corporation. It connects Shinjuku, Tokyo, with the suburban city of Hachiōji. The Keiō Line is part of a network with interchanges and through running to other lines of Keiō Corporation: the Keiō New Line, Keiō Sagamihara Line, the Keiō Keibajō Line, the Keiō Dōbutsuen Line, the Keiō Takao Line, and the 1,067 mm (3 ft 6 in) gauge Keiō Inokashira Line.

== Services ==
Six different types of limited-stop services are operated on the Keiō Line, along with local trains. Destinations are from Shinjuku unless otherwise indicated. English abbreviations are tentative for this article.

Local (各駅停車, kakueki teisha)
Also known as kakutei (各停) for short. Until 2001 it was called futsū (普通).
Rapid (快速, kaisoku)
Most services for Hashimoto and Keiō-Tama-Center on the Sagamihara Line, and Takaosanguchi on the Takao Line
Semi Express (区間急行, kukan kyūkō)
Most bound for on the Sagamihara Line. Until 2013, these were weekday-only services called "Commuter Rapid" (通勤快速, tsūkin kaisoku).
Express (急行, kyūkō)
Most services run from the Toei Shinjuku Line locally and used as the express on the Sagamihara Line via Chōfu in mornings and evenings; other services in mornings and evenings are bound for Keiō-Hachiōji, Takaosanguchi and Takahatafudō.
Special Express (特急, tokkyū)
Most services bound for Keiō-Hachiōji and Takaosanguchi can make the run from Shinjuku in 37 minutes and 39 minutes respectively.
Mt. TAKAO (MT)
Reserved-seat supplementary-fare services between Shinjuku and Takaosanguchi on the Takao Line. Services operate weekends and holidays with three round-trips. Trains to Takaosanguchi run nonstop after Meidaimae, while trains to Shinjuku make additional stops to receive passengers.
Keiō Liner (京王ライナー, Keiō rainā)
Reserved-seat supplementary-fare services between Shinjuku and either Keiō-Hachiōji or Hashimoto. Services operate daily, with services to Shinjuku in the morning and from Shinjuku in the evening. Fewer trains operate on weekends and holidays. On trains from Shinjuku, reserved seat tickets are only required up to the first train stop after Meidaimae, after which the train's seats become unreserved.

== Stations ==
- All stations are located in Tokyo.
- Local trains stop at all stations.

Legend:

● - all trains stop at this station
◇ - trains stop at this station during special events
▲ - Shinjuku-bound trains stop to pick up passengers
| - all trains pass

| No. | Station | Distance in km (mi) | | Rapid | Semi Express | Express | Special Express | Keiō Liner | Mt. TAKAO | Transfers | Location |
| No. | Station | Between stations | Total | Rapid | Semi Express | Express | Special Express | Keiō Liner | Mt. TAKAO | Transfers | Location |
|---|---|---|---|---|---|---|---|---|---|---|---|
| KO-01 | Shinjuku 新宿 | —N/a | 0 (0) | ● | ● | ● | ● | ● | ● | Chūō Line (JC05); Chūō–Sōbu Line (JB10); Yamanote Line (JY17); Saikyō Line (JA11); Shōnan–Shinjuku Line (JS20); Marunouchi Line (M-08); Ōedo Line (E-27, Shinjuku-Nishiguchi: E-01); Shinjuku Line (S-01); Odawara Line (OH01); Shinjuku Line (Seibu-Shinjuku: SS01) | Shinjuku |
Hatsudai and Hatagaya stations are only accessible via the Keiō New Line.
| KO-04 | Sasazuka 笹塚 | 3.6 (2.2) | 3.6 (2.2) | ● | ● | ● | ● | | | | | Keiō New Line (some through trains) | Shibuya |
| KO-05 | Daitabashi 代田橋 | 0.8 (0.50) | 4.4 (2.7) | | | | | | | | | | | | | | Setagaya |
| KO-06 | Meidaimae 明大前 | 0.8 (0.50) | 5.2 (3.2) | ● | ● | ● | ● | ● | ● | Inokashira Line (IN08) | Setagaya |
| KO-07 | Shimo-Takaido 下高井戸 | 0.9 (0.56) | 6.1 (3.8) | ● | | | | | | | | | | | Setagaya Line (SG10) | Setagaya |
| KO-08 | Sakurajōsui 桜上水 | 0.9 (0.56) | 7.0 (4.3) | ● | ● | ● | | | | | | | | Setagaya |
| KO-09 | Kami-Kitazawa 上北沢 | 0.8 (0.50) | 7.8 (4.8) | | | | | | | | | | | | | | Setagaya |
| KO-10 | Hachimanyama 八幡山 | 0.6 (0.37) | 8.4 (5.2) | ● | | | | | | | | | | | | Suginami |
| KO-11 | Roka-kōen 芦花公園 | 0.7 (0.43) | 9.1 (5.7) | | | | | | | | | | | | | | Setagaya |
| KO-12 | Chitose-Karasuyama 千歳烏山 | 0.8 (0.50) | 9.9 (6.2) | ● | ● | ● | ● | | | | | | Setagaya |
| KO-13 | Sengawa 仙川 | 1.6 (0.99) | 11.5 (7.1) | ● | ● | | | | | | | | | | Chōfu |
| KO-14 | Tsutsujigaoka つつじヶ丘 | 1.0 (0.62) | 12.5 (7.8) | ● | ● | ● | | | | | | | | Chōfu |
| KO-15 | Shibasaki 柴崎 | 0.8 (0.50) | 13.3 (8.3) | | | | | | | | | | | | | | Chōfu |
| KO-16 | Kokuryō 国領 | 0.9 (0.56) | 14.2 (8.8) | | | | | | | | | | | | | | Chōfu |
| KO-17 | Fuda 布田 | 0.7 (0.43) | 14.9 (9.3) | ◇ | ◇ | ◇ | ◇ | | | | | | Chōfu |
| KO-18 | Chōfu 調布 | 0.6 (0.37) | 15.5 (9.6) | ● | ● | ● | ● | | | | | Sagamihara Line (KO18; some trains through from Shinjuku) | Chōfu |
| KO-19 | Nishi-Chōfu 西調布 | 1.5 (0.93) | 17.0 (10.6) | ● | | | | | | | | | | | | Chōfu |
| KO-20 | Tobitakyū 飛田給 | 0.7 (0.43) | 17.7 (11.0) | ● | ◇ | ◇ | ◇ | ◇ | | | | Chōfu |
| KO-21 | Musashinodai 武蔵野台 | 1.1 (0.68) | 18.8 (11.7) | ● | | | | | | | | | | | Tamagawa Line (Shiraitodai: SW04 or Tama: SW03) | Fuchū |
| KO-22 | Tama-Reien 多磨霊園 | 0.8 (0.50) | 19.6 (12.2) | ● | | | | | | | | | | | | Fuchū |
| KO-23 | Higashi-Fuchū 東府中 | 0.8 (0.50) | 20.4 (12.7) | ● | ● | ● | ◇ | | | | | Keibajō Line (KO23; some trains through from Shinjuku) | Fuchū |
| KO-24 | Fuchū 府中 | 1.5 (0.93) | 21.9 (13.6) | ● | ● | ● | ● | ● | ▲ | | Fuchū |
| KO-25 | Bubaigawara 分倍河原 | 1.2 (0.75) | 23.1 (14.4) | ● | ● | ● | ● | ● | ▲ | Nambu Line (JN21) | Fuchū |
| KO-26 | Nakagawara 中河原 | 1.6 (0.99) | 24.7 (15.3) | ● | ● | | | | | | | | | | Fuchū |
| KO-27 | Seiseki-Sakuragaoka 聖蹟桜ヶ丘 | 1.6 (0.99) | 26.3 (16.3) | ● | ● | ● | ● | ● | ▲ | | Tama |
| KO-28 | Mogusaen 百草園 | 1.7 (1.1) | 28.0 (17.4) | ● | ● | ◇ | ◇ | | | | | | Hino |
| KO-29 | Takahatafudō 高幡不動 | 1.7 (1.1) | 29.7 (18.5) | ● | ● | ● | ● | ● | ▲ | Dōbutsuen Line (KO29); Tama Toshi Monorail Line (TT07) | Hino |
| KO-30 | Minamidaira 南平 | 2.4 (1.5) | 32.1 (19.9) | ● | ● | | | | | | | | | | Hino |
| KO-31 | Hirayamajōshi-kōen 平山城址公園 | 1.3 (0.81) | 33.4 (20.8) | ● | ● | | | | | | | | | | Hino |
| KO-32 | Naganuma 長沼 | 1.5 (0.93) | 34.9 (21.7) | ● | ● | | | | | | | | | | Hachiōji |
| KO-33 | Kitano 北野 | 1.2 (0.75) | 36.1 (22.4) | ● | ● | ● | ● | ● | ▲ | Takao Line (KO33; some trains through from Shinjuku) | Hachiōji |
| KO-34 | Keiō-Hachiōji 京王八王子 | 1.8 (1.1) | 37.9 (23.5) | ● | ● | ● | ● | ● | | Chūō Line (Hachiōji: JC22); Yokohama Line (Hachiōji: JH32); ■ Hachikō Line (Hachiōji) | Hachiōji |

Events at stations marked with a "◇" symbol for which trains make special seasonal stops:

- Fuda Station: Chofu City Fireworks Festival
- Tobitakyū Station: Soccer games, concerts, etc. at Ajinomoto Stadium
- Higashi-Fuchū Station: Events (including the Arima Kinen) at Tokyo Racecourse; transfer to the Keiō Keibajō Line
- Nakagawara Station: Seiseki-Tamagawa Fireworks Festival
- Mogusaen Station: Saturdays and holidays during the Plum Blossom Festival

== History ==
The Shinjuku to Chōfu section opened in 1913 as a 1,372 mm (4 ft 6 in) gauge interurban line electrified at 600 V DC, and was progressively extended in both directions so that the line connected Shinjuku and Fuchu in 1916. The Sasazuka to Fuchu section was double-tracked between 1920 and 1923.

The extension to Higashi-Hachiōji (now Keiō-Hachiōji) was completed by a related company, Gyokunan Electric Railway, in 1925. This electrified line was built to the Japanese standard narrow gauge of 1,067 mm (3 ft 6 in) in an attempt to seek a government subsidy, and so trains from each railway could not operate on the other's tracks. The subsidy application was rejected on the basis that the line competed with the Japanese Government Railways (JGR) Chūō Main Line, and so the Gyokunan Electric Railway merged with the Keiō Electric Railway Co., the line was regauged to 1,372 mm, and operation of trains from Shinjuku to Higashi-Hachiōji commenced in 1928.

The Fuchu to Nakagawara and Seiseki-Sakuragaoka to Kitano sections were double-tracked in 1929. In 1963, the original terminus at Shinjuku and the streetrunning section on what is today Japan National Route 20 towards Sasazuka Station was moved to an underground alignment. Additionally the overhead line voltage was increased to 1,500 V DC. The Nakagawara to Seiseki-Sakuragaoka section was double-tracked in 1964. The Kitano to Keiō-Hachiōji section was double-tracked in 1970, and the relocation of the terminal station underground was completed in 1989.

From the start of the revised timetable introduced on 25 September 2015, Semi Special Express services were also to stop at Sasazuka and Chitose-Karasuyama stations, and Semi Express services added a stop at Sengawa Station.

The flat junction west of Chofu station between the Keiō Line and Keiō Sagamihara Line has been a source of congestion in the entire Keiō network for years. Keiō has reconfigured the station and put the entire junction and Chofu Station underground to improve operations and separate traffic between the two lines. The underground section of the Keiō around Chofu Station to Kokuryo was completed in 2012.

=== Level crossings and congestion ===
The Keiō Line is infamous for its level crossings, of which the 25 lying on the 7.2-kilometer (4.5 mi) section between Sasazuka and Sengawa stations are classified by the Tokyo Metropolitan Government Construction Bureau as akazu no fumikiri (開かずの踏切; lit. 'railroad crossings that never open') as they are closed to road traffic for over 40 minutes in an hour. Congestion on the Keiō Line is also a concern, with trains often running as close as 1 minute apart during rush hours. In 2016, Keiō and the Tokyo Metropolitan Government Construction Bureau proposed that the section between Sasazuka and Chofu be grade separated and widened to quadruple-track to reduce the effects caused by the present bunching on the existing at-grade double-tracked line. Later the proposal evolved to call for two separate sets of tracks each dedicated to express and local services, similar to the Keiō and Keiō New lines between Sasazuka and Shinjuku Stations.

With the completion of the undergrounding between Chofu and Kokuryo Stations in 2012, construction has started on elevating the line between Sasazuka and Sengawa Stations. The government has planned the grade-separating project for this section of line to be completed by 2022, but this date has been delayed due to land acquisition issues and is now slated to be completed in 2031.

Keiō has proposed a later phase for the whole corridor, which involves building another pair of underground tracks for express services between Sasazuka and Chofu, completing the quadruple-tracking of the corridor until the bifurcation of the Keiō New Line. The design of Chofu Station after the completion of the undergrounding works in 2012 allows for the inclusion of another set of underground express tracks in the future. However, due factors such as Japan's declining population, the effectiveness of these new tracks have been questioned. Therefore, there is a high likelihood that this will never be constructed.
