= Takahatafudō Station =

Railway and monorail station in Hino, Tokyo, Japan

Takahatafudō Station 高幡不動駅
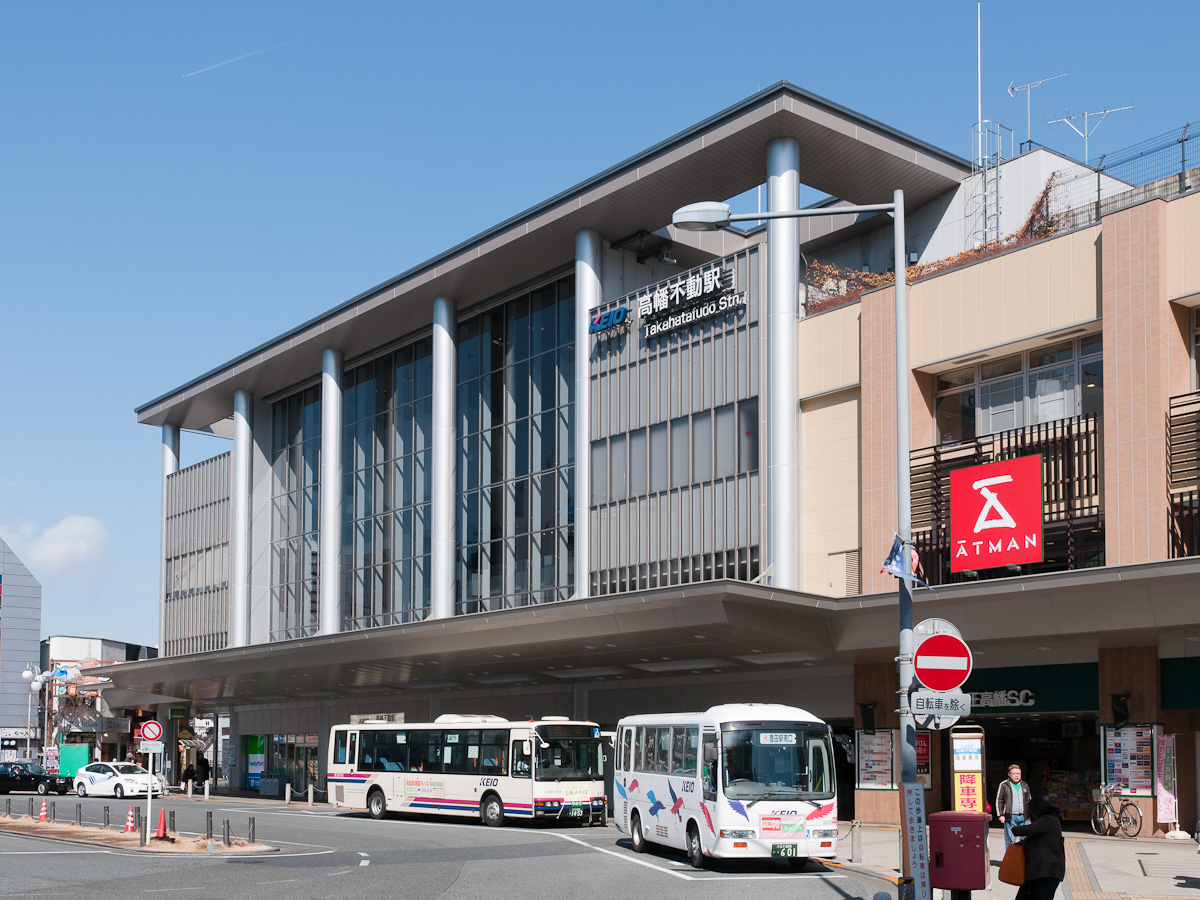
- Keiō Takahatafudō Station, February 2011

General information
- Location: Takahata, Hino-shi, Tokyo 191-0031; Japan
- Coordinates: 35°39′44″N 139°24′48″E
- Operator: Keio Corporation; Tokyo Tama Intercity Monorail
- Lines: Keio Line; Keiō Dōbutsuen Line; ■ Tama Toshi Monorail Line
- Connections: Bus terminal

History
- Opened: 24 March 1925; 101 years ago
Location
- Location within Tokyo Location within Japan

Takahatafudō Station (高幡不動駅, Takahatafudō-eki) is an interchange passenger railway station and monorail station on located in the city of Hino, Tokyo, Japan. Most of the passengers boarding at Takahatafudō are commuters and students bound for central Tokyo, while those disembarking are visiting the Kongō-ji Temple or are students transferring to the monorail or buses.

== Lines ==
Takahatafudō Station is served by the Keio Line, and is located 29.7 kilometers from the starting point of the line at Shinjuku Station. It is also the terminus of the Keiō Dōbutsuen Line. The Tama Toshi Monorail Line also serves Takahatafudō Station.

== Station layout ==
Takahatafudō Station 高幡不動駅

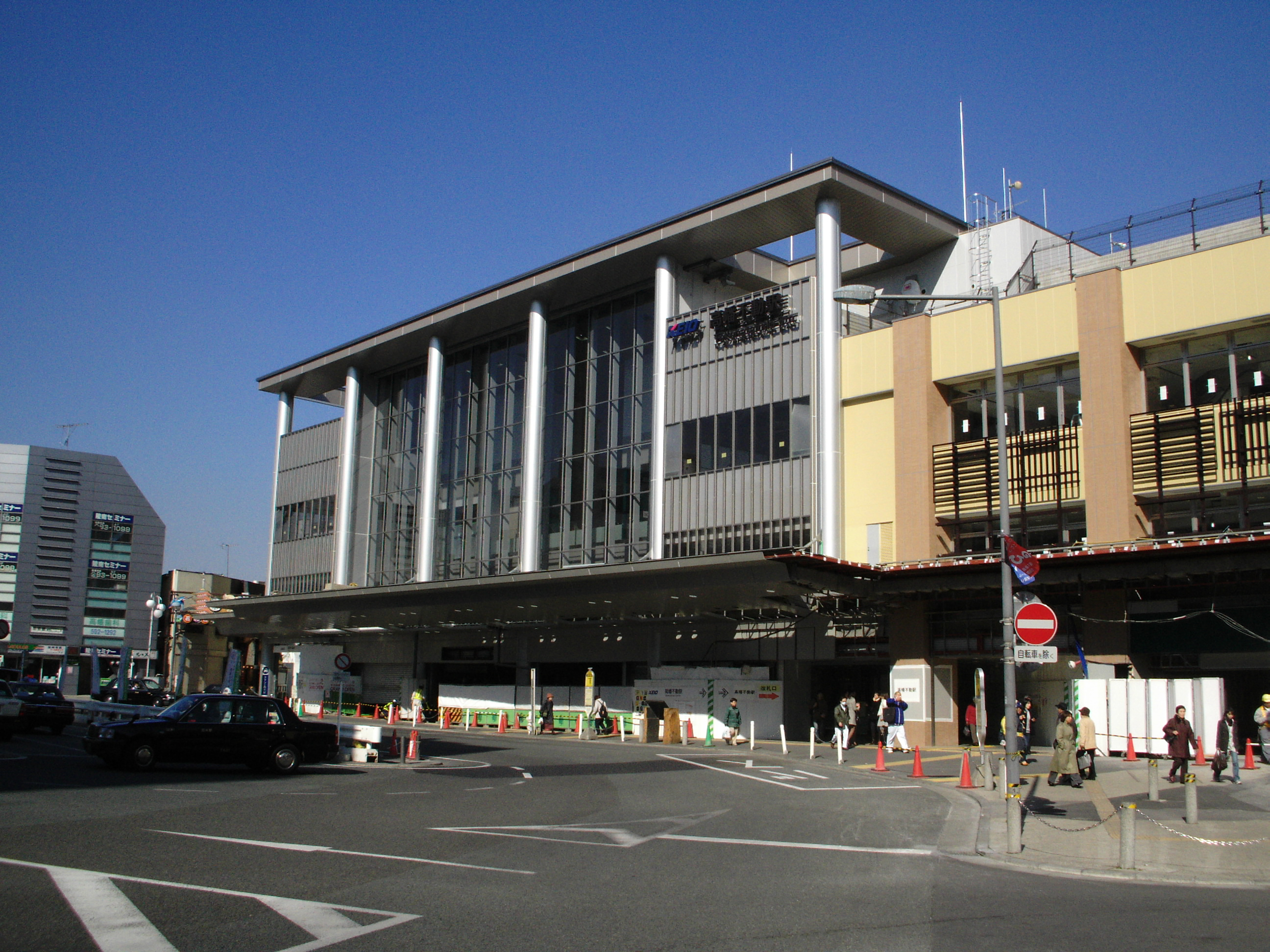
- Keiō Takahatafudō Station (south side)

General information
- Location: 139 Takahata, Hino-shi, Tokyo 191-0031; Japan
- System: Keio railway station
- Operator: Keio Corporation
- Lines: Keio Line; Keiō Dōbutsuen Line
- Distance: 29.7 km from Shinjuku
- Platforms: 2 island + 1 side platform
- Connections: Bus terminal

Other information
- Station code: KO29

History
- Opened: 24 March 1925
- Former names: Takahata (until 1937)

Passengers
- FY2019: 58,426

Services
Preceding station	Keio Corporation	Following station
Kitano One-way operation	Keiō Line Mt Takao	Seiseki-sakuragaoka towards Shinjuku
Kitano towards Keiō-hachiōji	Keiō Liner	Seiseki-sakuragaoka towards Shinjuku
Kitano towards Keiō-hachiōji	Keiō Line Special Express Express	Seiseki-sakuragaoka towards Shinjuku
Minamidaira towards Keiō-hachiōji	Keiō Line Semi Express Rapid Local	Mogusaen towards Shinjuku
Tama-dōbutsukōen Terminus	Dōbutsuen Line Express	through to Keiō Line
Tama-dōbutsukōen Terminus	Dōbutsuen Line Local	Terminus
Location

=== Keio platforms ===
The Keio station has two island platforms with four tracks for the Keio Line, and one side platform for the Keio Dōbutsuen Line. All trains stop at this station.

1	Keiō Dōbutsuen Line	for Tama-Dōbutsukōen
2, 3	Keiō Line	for Kitano and Keiō-Hachiōji; Keiō Takao Line for Takaosanguchi (via Kitano)
4, 5	Keiō Line	for Fuchū, Chōfu, Meidaimae, Sasazuka, and Shinjuku; Toei Shinjuku Line

Takahatafudō Station 高幡不動駅
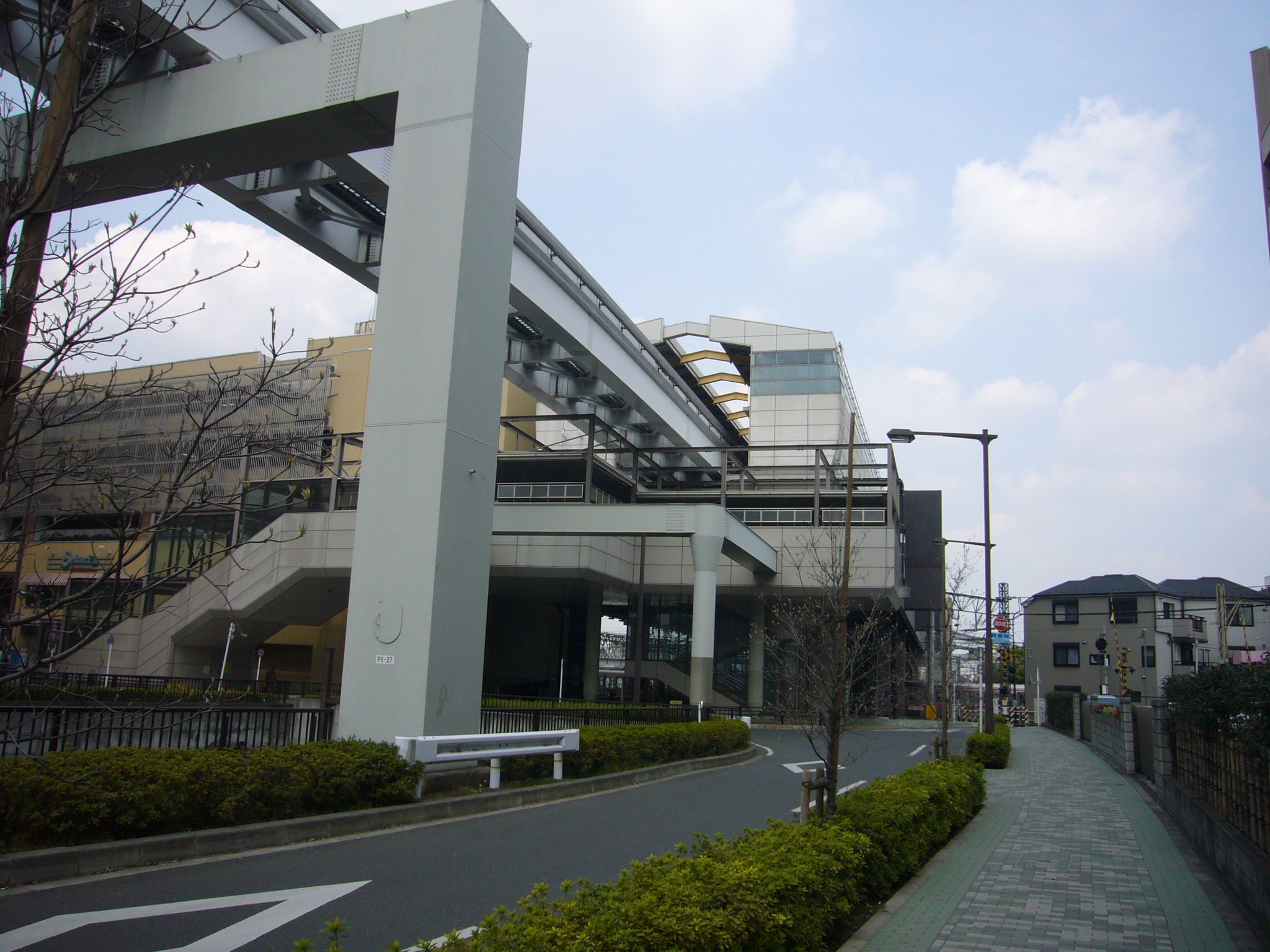
- Takahatafudō Station (Tama Monorail)

General information
- Location: 1039-1 Takahata, Hino-shi, Tokyo; Japan
- System: monorail station
- Operator: Tokyo Tama Intercity Monorail
- Line: ■ Tama Toshi Monorail Line
- Distance: 10.5 km from Kamikitadai
- Platforms: 2 side platforms
- Connections: Bus terminal

Other information
- Station code: TT07

History
- Opened: 10 January 2000

Passengers
- FY2019: 26,148 (daily)

Services
Preceding station	Tokyo Tama Intercity Monorail	Following station
Hodokubo (TT-06) towards Tama-Center	Tama Toshi Monorail Line	Manganji (TT-08) towards Kamikitadai
Location

=== Tama Toshi Monorail platforms ===
Takahatafudō Station is a raised station with two tracks and two opposed side platforms, with the station building located underneath. It is a standardized station building for this monorail line. Due to the concentration of university campuses towards Tama-Center, many students change trains at this station.

1	■ Tama Toshi Monorail Line	for Tachikawa-Kita, Tamagawa-Jōsui, and Kamikitadai
2	■ Tama Toshi Monorail Line	for Tama-Dōbutsukōen and Tama-Center

== History ==
- 24 March 1925: Takahata Station opens along with the opening of the Gyokunan Electric Railway (now Keio Line), in a different location than the current station building.
- 1 May 1937: Station renamed from Takahata Station to Takahatafudō Station.
- 1957: Four-car rapid and semi-rapid trains to Shinjuku begin operating during peak periods.
- 29 April 1964: The Tama Dōbutsuen Line (now Dōbutsuen Line) opens. Station building moved to current location.
- 10 January 2000: The Tama Toshi Monorail Line station opens.
- March 2004: Station building shopping area construction begins.
- August 2004: Station building elevation construction begins.
- December 2004: Shopping area construction completed.
- 25 March 2007: Station building elevation complete, linking the Keio and monorail station areas and shopping areas.
- February 2018: Station numbering was introduced on the Tama Toshi Monorail Line with the station being assigned TT07.

== Passenger statistics ==
In fiscal 2019, the Keio station was used by an average of 58,426 passengers daily. During the same period, the Tama Monorail portion of the station was used by 26,148 passengers daily.

== Surrounding area ==
The namesake of the station is Kongōji Temple, also known as Takahatafudō, one of the great temples of the Kantō region. The area's development was guided first by worshippers visiting the temple, then by suburbanization during the 1960s and 1970s. The station is a major transportation hub for Hino, with many municipal facilities and shopping centers in the vicinity.
