= Kitano Station (Tokyo) =

Railway station in Hachiōji, Tokyo, Japan

Kitano Station 北野駅

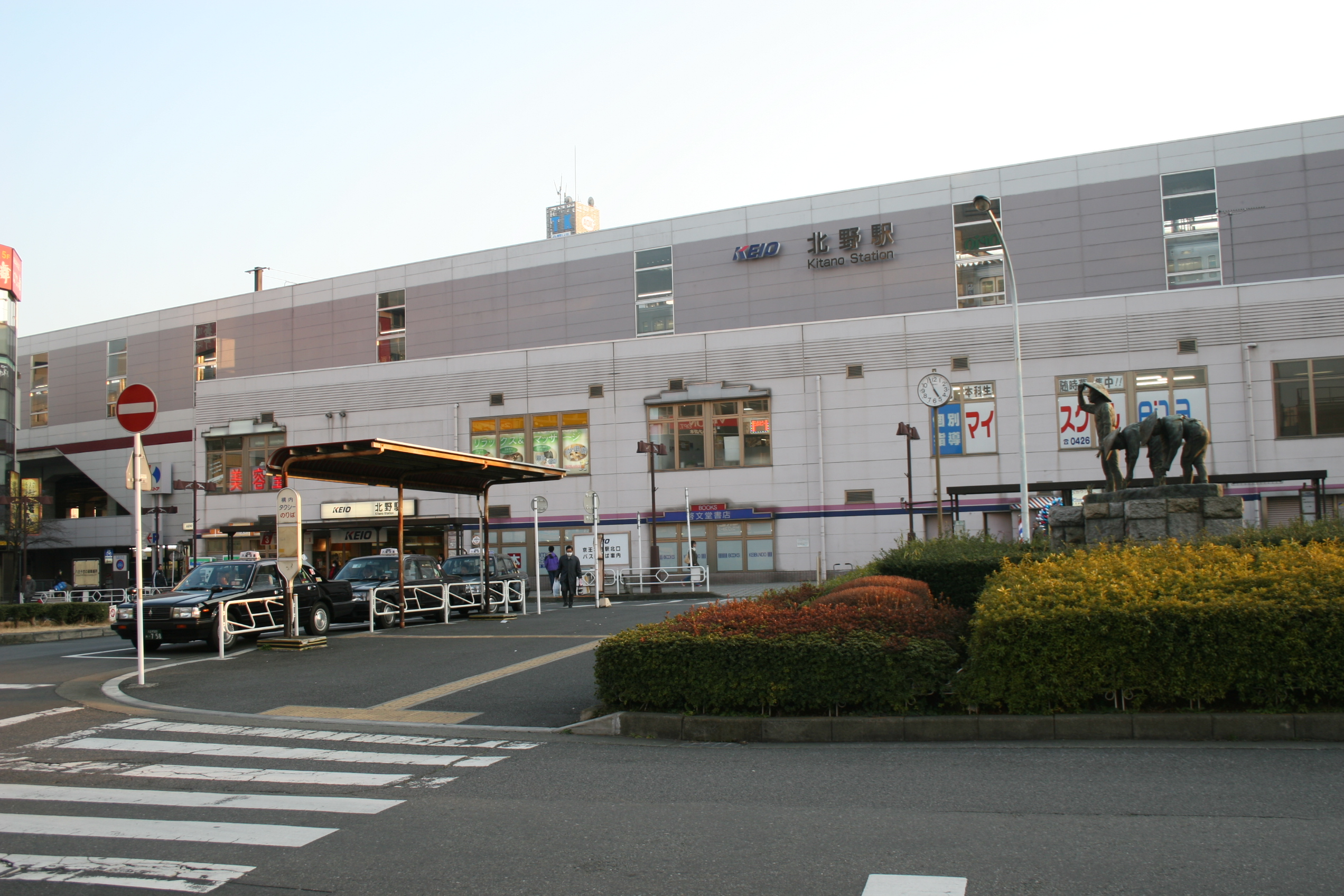
- Kitano Station, March 2008

General information
- Location: 335-1 Kochigoshi-machi, Hachiōji, Tokyo 192-0911; Japan
- Coordinates: 35°38′39.9″N 139°21′16.7″E
- Operator: Keio Corporation
- Lines: Keiō Line; Takao Line
- Distance: 36.1 km from Shinjuku
- Platforms: 2 island platforms

Other information
- Station code: KO33
- Website: Official website

History
- Opened: March 24, 1925; 101 years ago

Passengers
- FY2019: 23,006

Services
Preceding station	Keio Corporation	Following station
Keiō-hachiōji Terminus	Keiō Liner	Takahatafudō towards Shinjuku
Keiō-hachiōji Terminus	Keiō Line Special Express Express	Takahatafudō towards Shinjuku
Keiō-hachiōji Terminus	Keiō Line Semi Express Rapid Local	Naganuma towards Shinjuku
Mejirodai One-way operation	Takao Line Mt Takao	Takahatafudō towards Shinjuku
Mejirodai towards Takaosanguchi	Takao Line Special Express Express	through to Keio Line
Keiō-katakura towards Takaosanguchi	Takao Line Semi Express Rapid Local	through to Keio Line
Location
- Location within Tokyo Location within Japan

Kitano Station (北野駅, Kitano-eki) is a junction passenger railway station located in the city of Hachiōji, Tokyo, Japan, operated by the private railway operator Keio Corporation.

== Lines ==
Kitano Station is a junction of the Keiō and Takao Lines. It is and is located 36.1 kilometers from the starting point of the Keio Line at Shinjuku Station and is a terminus of the Takao Line.

== Services ==
All seven types of train service stop at this station: local, rapid, semi express, express, semi special express, special express trains and Keiō Liner trains.

Trains run 0445-0050 weekdays and 0450-0045 weekends. The typical hourly weekday off-peak service is:

- 9 trains to Shinjuku, of which:
  - 3 are Special Express (Takahatafudō, Seiseki-sakuragaoka, Bubaigawara, Fuchū, Chōfu, Meidaimae and Shinjuku)
  - 3 are Semi-Special Express (Takahatafudō, Seiseki-sakuragaoka, Bubaigawara, Fuchū, Chōfu, Chitose-Karasuyama, Meidaimae, Sasazuka and Shinjuku)
  - 3 are Local
- 6 trains to Keiō-hachiōji
- 6 trains to Takaosanguchi, of which:
  - 3 are Special Express (Mejirodai, Takao, Takaosanguchi)
  - 3 are Local

The typical hourly weekend off-peak service is:

- 12 trains to Shinjuku, of which:
  - 3 are Special Express from Keiō-hachiōji
  - 3 are Semi-Special Express from Takaosanguchi
  - 6 are Local
- 6 trains to Keiō-hachiōji
- 6 Local trains to Takaosanguchi

== Station layout ==
The station has two elevated island platforms serving four tracks. Tracks 1 and 2 serve Keiō Line trains bound for Keiō-hachiōji Station and Takao Line trains bound for Takaosanguchi Station. Tracks 3 and 4 serve trains bound for Shinjuku Station.

=== Platforms ===
1, 2	Keiō Line	for Keiō-Hachiōji
1, 2	Keiō Takao Line	for Takao and Takaosanguchi
3, 4	Keiō Line	for Chōfu, Meidaimae, Sasazuka, and Shinjuku; Keiō Dōbutsuen Line for Tama-Dōbutsukōen (via Takahatafudō); Toei Shinjuku Line

== History ==
The station opened on March 24, 1925 as a stop on the Gyokunan Electric Railway, which was absorbed into the Keio Electric Tramway on December 1, 1926. The Goryō Line opened to Tama-Goryō-mae on March 20, 1931 but was suspended on January 21, 1945. After the war, on October 1, 1967, Keio Teito Electric Railway opened the Takao Line to Takaosanguchi, part of which used the old Goryō Line. The station was elevated in the early 1990s. Semi Special Express services began calling here following their creation on March 27, 2001.

== Passenger statistics ==
In fiscal 2019, the station was used by an average of 23,006 passengers daily.

The passenger figures (boarding passengers only) for previous years are as shown below.

Fiscal year	daily average
2005	21,469
2010	22,530
2015	22,357

== Surrounding area ==
- Hachiōji city hall Kitano branch office

== See also ==
- List of railway stations in Japan
