= Keiō-hachiōji Station =

Railway station in Hachiōji, Tokyo, Japan

Keiō-hachiōji Station 京王八王子駅

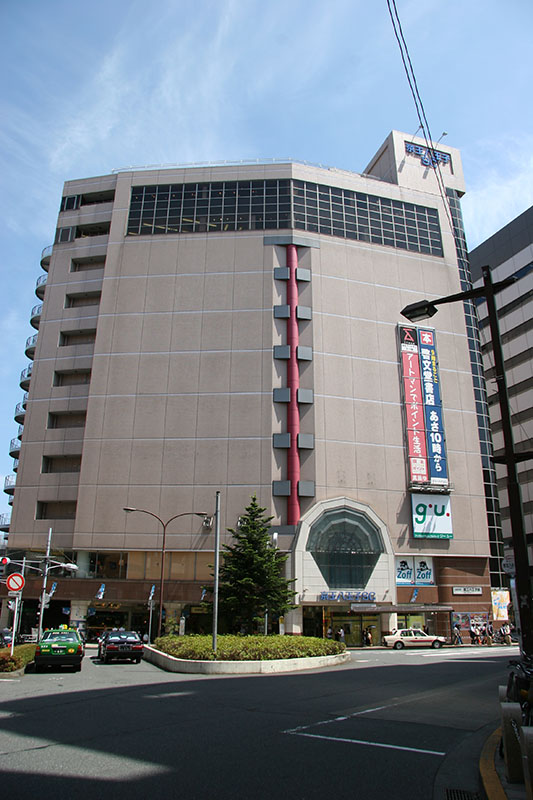
- Keiō-hachiōji Station and Keiō-hachiōji Shopping Center "K-8"

General information
- Location: 3-27-1 Myojin-cho, Hachiōji-shi, Tokyo 192-0046; Japan
- Coordinates: 35.6578803°N 139.3431401°E
- Operator: Keio Corporation
- Line: Keio Line
- Distance: 37.9 km from Shinjuku
- Platforms: 1 island platform
- Tracks: 2

Other information
- Station code: KO34
- Website: Official website

History
- Opened: 24 March 1925; 101 years ago
- Former names: Higashi-Hachiōji Station (until 1963)

Passengers
- FY2019: 58,124

Services
Preceding station	Keio Corporation	Following station
Terminus	Keiō Liner	Kitano towards Shinjuku
Terminus	Keiō Line Special Express Express Semi Express Rapid Local	Kitano towards Shinjuku
Location
- Location within Tokyo Location within Japan

Keiō-hachiōji Station (京王八王子駅, Keiō-hachiōji-eki) is a passenger railway station located in the city of Hachiōji, Tokyo, Japan, operated by the private railway operator Keio Corporation. It is a five-minute walk from JR East's Hachiōji Station.

== Lines ==
Keiō-hachiōji Station is a terminus of the Keio Line, and is located 37.9 kilometers from the opposing terminus of the line at Shinjuku Station.

== Station layout ==
This station consists of one underground dead-headed island platforms serving two tracks, with the station building located above.

=== Platforms ===
1, 2	Keiō Line	for Kitano, Chōfu, Meidaimae, Sasazuka, and Shinjuku; Keiō Takao Line for Takaosanguchi (via Kitano); Keiō Sagamihara Line for Hashimoto (via Chōfu); Toei Shinjuku Line for Motoyawata (only one departure in morning peak hour)

== History ==
The station opened on 24 March 1925, originally named Higashi-Hachiōji Station (東八王子駅). The station was renamed on 11 December 1963 and moved 190 m closer to Tokyo. It was rebuilt as an underground station on 2 April 1989.

From 22 February 2013, station numbering was introduced on Keio lines, with Keiō-hachiōji Station becoming "KO34".

== Passenger statistics ==
In fiscal 2019, the station was used by an average of 58,124 passengers daily.

The passenger figures (boarding passengers only) for previous years are as shown below.

Fiscal year	daily average
2005	59,676
2010	58,366
2015	59,083

== Surrounding area ==
- Hachiōji Station (JR East Chuo Main Line)
