= Sasazuka Station =

Railway station in Tokyo, Japan

Coordinates: 35°40′25″N 139°40′02″E

Sasazuka Station 笹塚駅

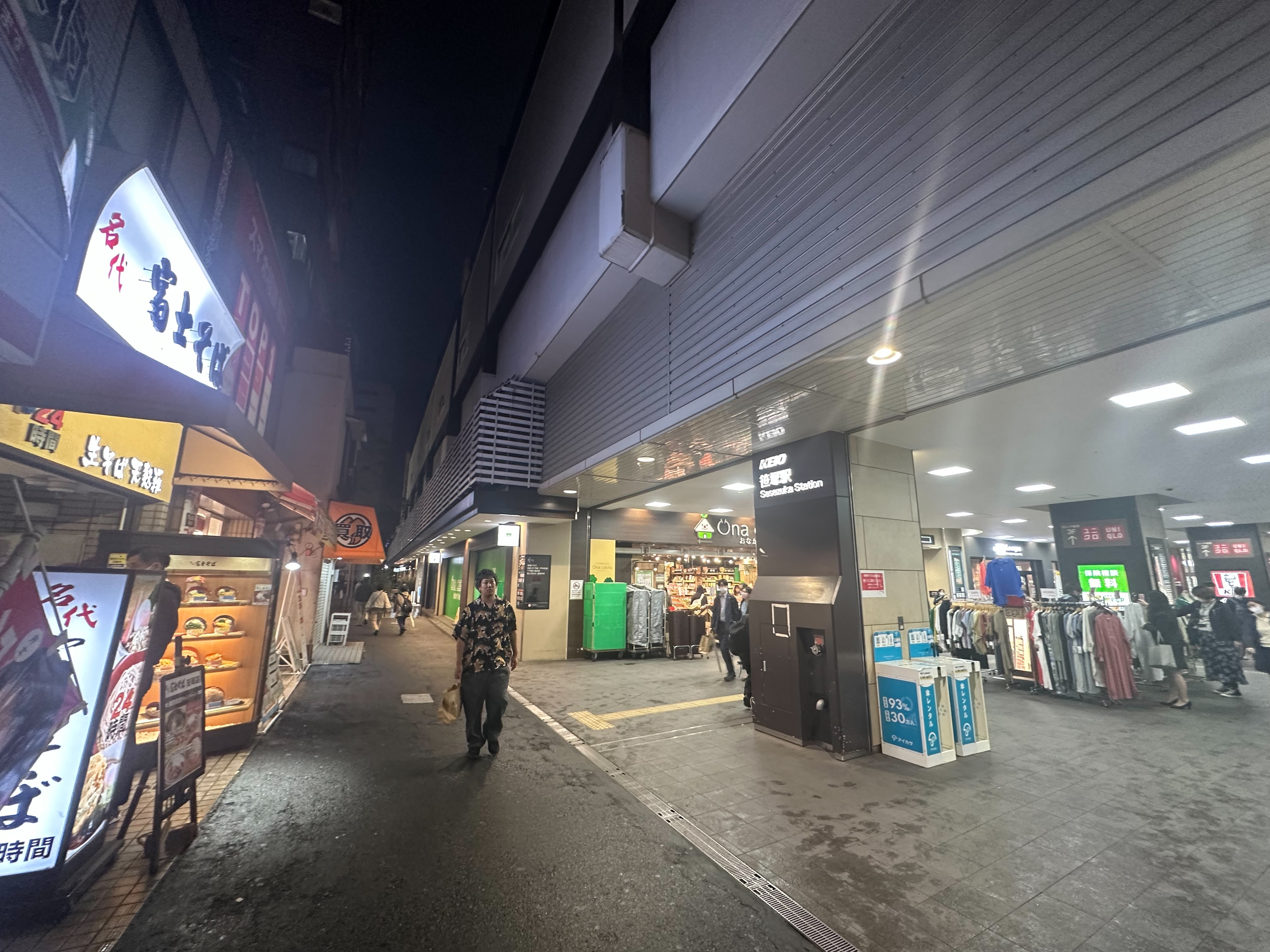
- North entrance, May 2023

General information
- Location: Shibuya, Tokyo; Japan
- Operator: Keio Corporation
- Lines: Keio Line, Keio New Line
- Platforms: 2 island platforms
- Tracks: 4

Construction
- Structure type: Elevated

Other information
- Station code: KO04

History
- Opened: 15 April 1913; 113 years ago

Services
Preceding station	Keio Corporation	Following station
Meidaimae towards Keiō-hachiōji	Keiō Line Special Express Express Semi Express Rapid	Shinjuku Terminus
Daitabashi towards Keiō-hachiōji	Keiō Line Local	Shinjuku Terminus
through to Keiō Line	Keiō New Line Express Semi Express Rapid Local	Hatagaya towards Shinjuku
Terminus	Keiō New Line	Motoyawata towards Shinjuku
Location

Sasazuka Station (笹塚駅, Sasazuka-eki) is a railway station in Shibuya, Tokyo, Japan, operated by the private railway operator Keio Corporation.

== Lines ==
Sasazuka station is served by the Keio Line and Keio New Line.

== Station layout ==
The station has two elevated island platforms serving four tracks.

=== Platforms ===
1	Keiō Line	(from Shinjuku on the Keiō Line) for Meidaimae, Chōfu, Keiō-Hachiōji, Takaosanguchi, Hashimoto
2	Keiō Line	(from Shinjuku on the Keiō New Line) for Meidaimae, Chōfu, Hashimoto
3	Keiō New Line	for Shinjuku; Toei Shinjuku Line for Moto-Yawata
4	Keiō Line	for Shinjuku

== History ==
Sasazuka Station opened on 15 April 1913. It became the terminus of the Keiō New Line when it began operation on 30 October 1978.
