= Takaosanguchi Station =

Railway station in Hachiōji, Tokyo, Japan

Takaosanguchi Station 高尾山口駅

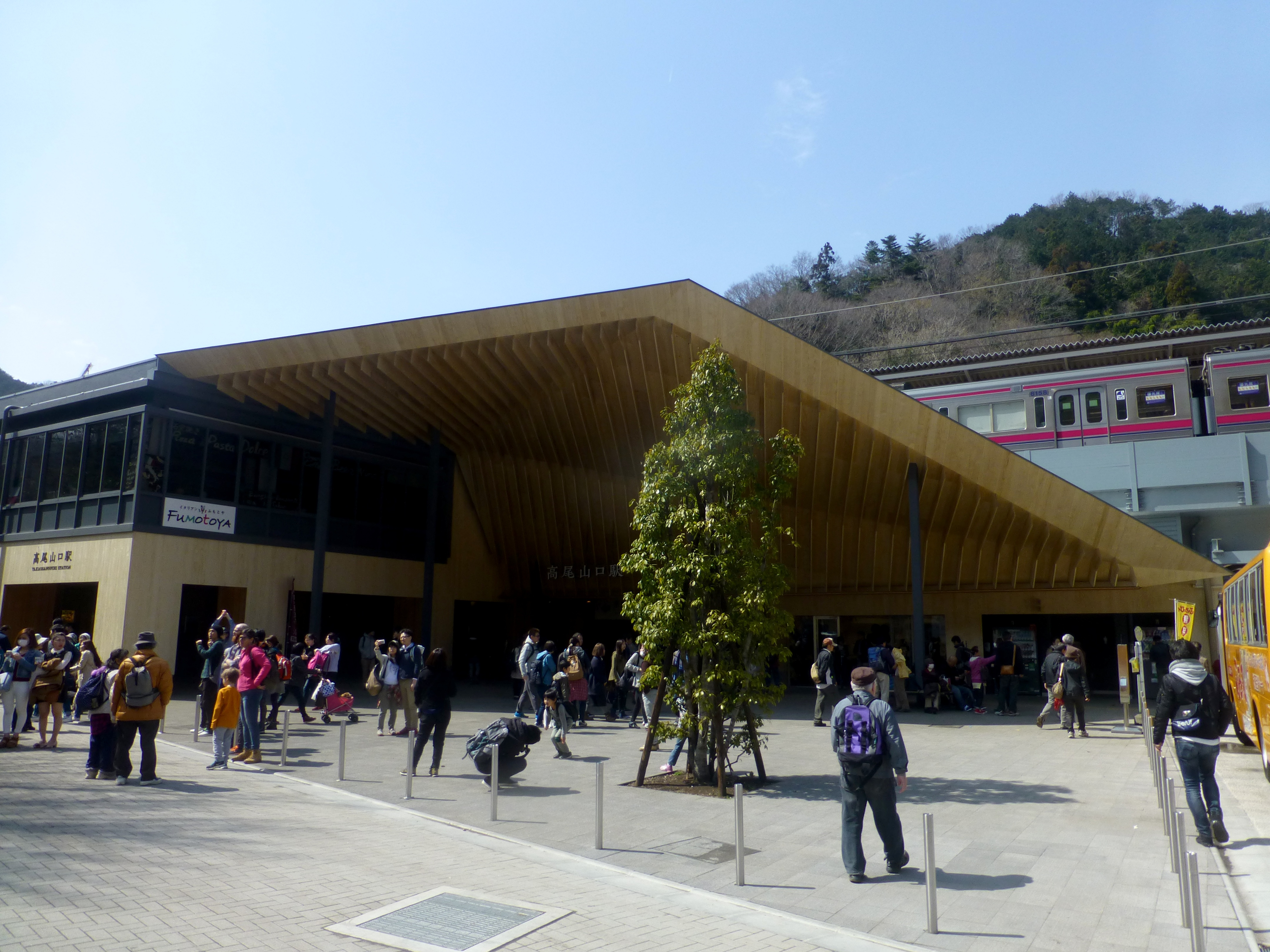
- Takaosanguchi Station in March 2016

General information
- Location: 2241 Takao-machi, Hachiōji-shi, Tokyo 193-0844; Japan
- Coordinates: 35.632224°N 139.269882°E
- Operator: Keio Corporation
- Line: Keio Takao Line
- Distance: 44.7 km from Shinjuku
- Platforms: 1 island platform
- Tracks: 2
- Connections: Bus stop

Other information
- Station code: KO53
- Website: Official website

History
- Opened: 1 October 1967
- Rebuilt: 2015

Passengers
- FY2019: 10,431

Services
Preceding station	Keio Corporation	Following station
Terminus	Takao Line Mt Takao	Meidaimae One-way operation
Terminus	Takao Line Mt Takao	Takao towards Shinjuku
Terminus	Takao Line Special Express Express Semi Express Rapid Local	Takao towards Kitano
Location
- Location within Tokyo Location within Japan

Takaosanguchi Station (高尾山口駅, Takaosanguchi-eki)is a passenger railway station located in the city of Hachiōji, Tokyo, Japan, operated by the private railway operator Keio Corporation. It is the main point of railway access to Mount Takao.

== Lines ==
Takaosanguchi Station is the terminus of the Keio Takao Line, and is located 8.6 kilometers from the starting point of the line at Kitano, and 44.7 kilometers from Shinjuku Station in central Tokyo. The station is numbered "KO53".

== Station layout ==
The station has a single dead-headed island platform serving two tracks located on the second floor ("2F") level, with the station entrance and concourse located on the ground floor.

=== Platforms ===
1/2	Keiō Takao Line	for Takao and Kitano; Keio Line for Takahatafudō, Chōfu, Meidaimae, and Shinjuku; Toei Shinjuku Line for Motoyawata

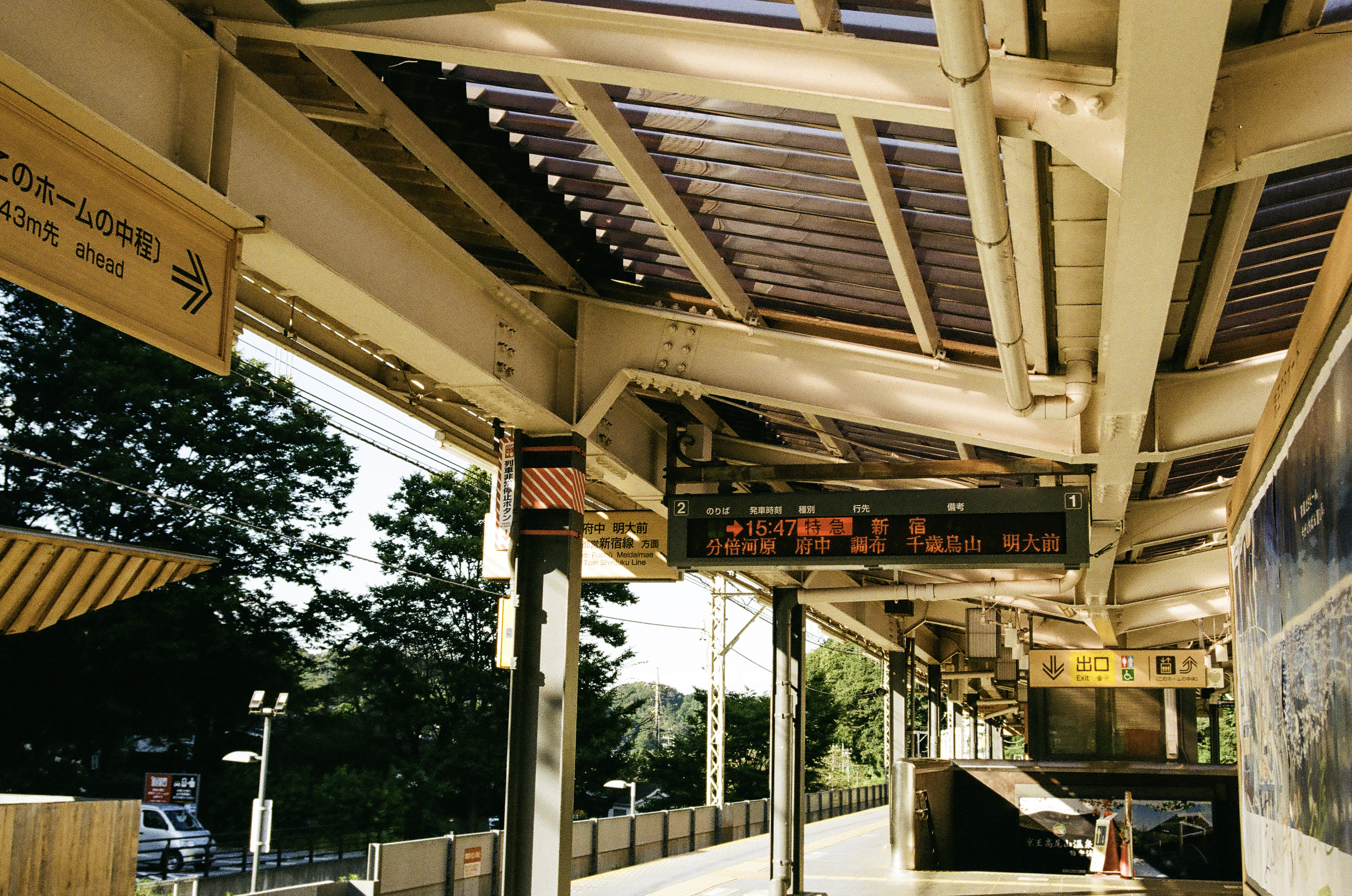
Platform 2 looking toward Kitano in September 2024

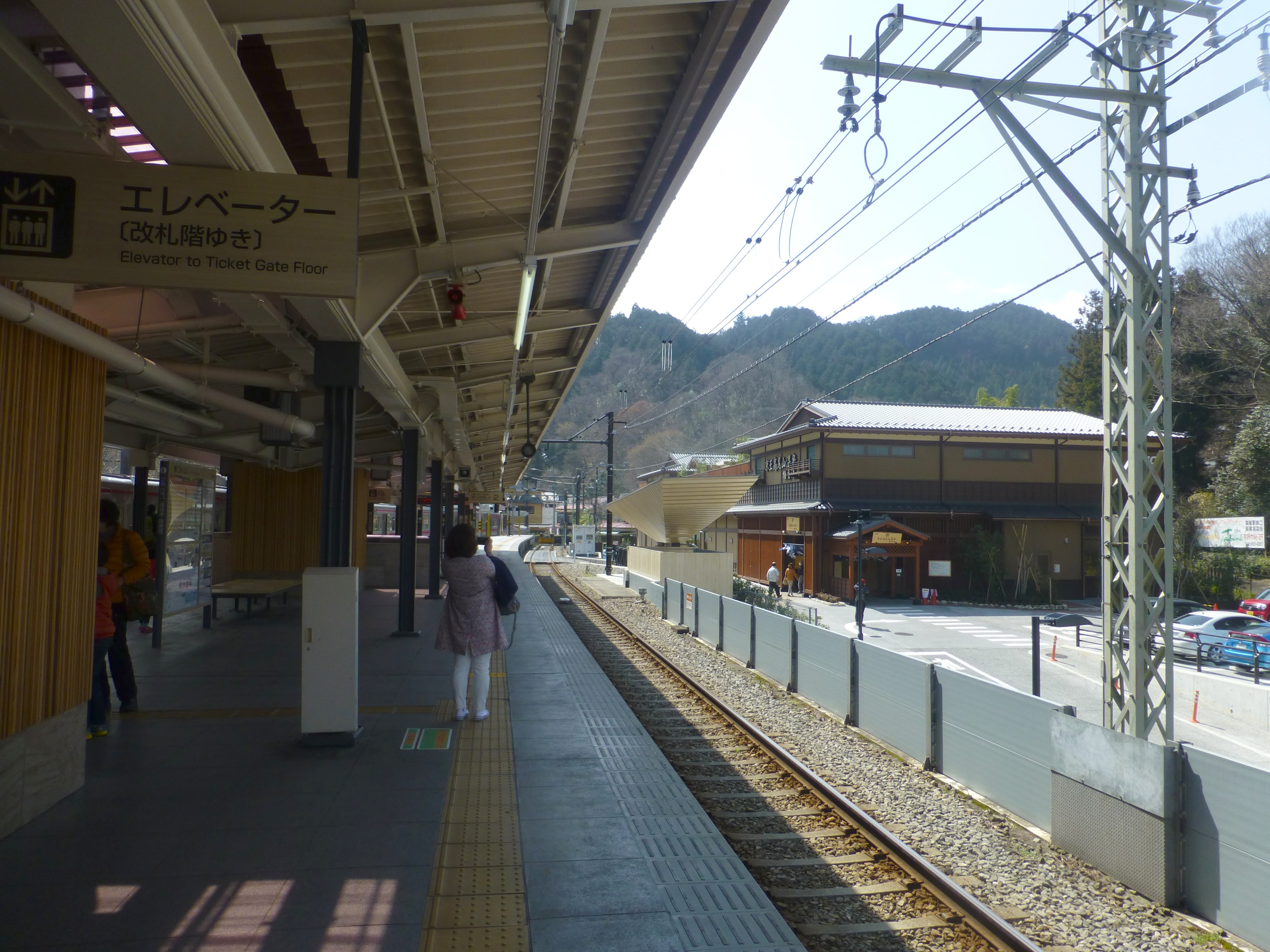
Platform 2 looking toward the buffer stops in March 2016

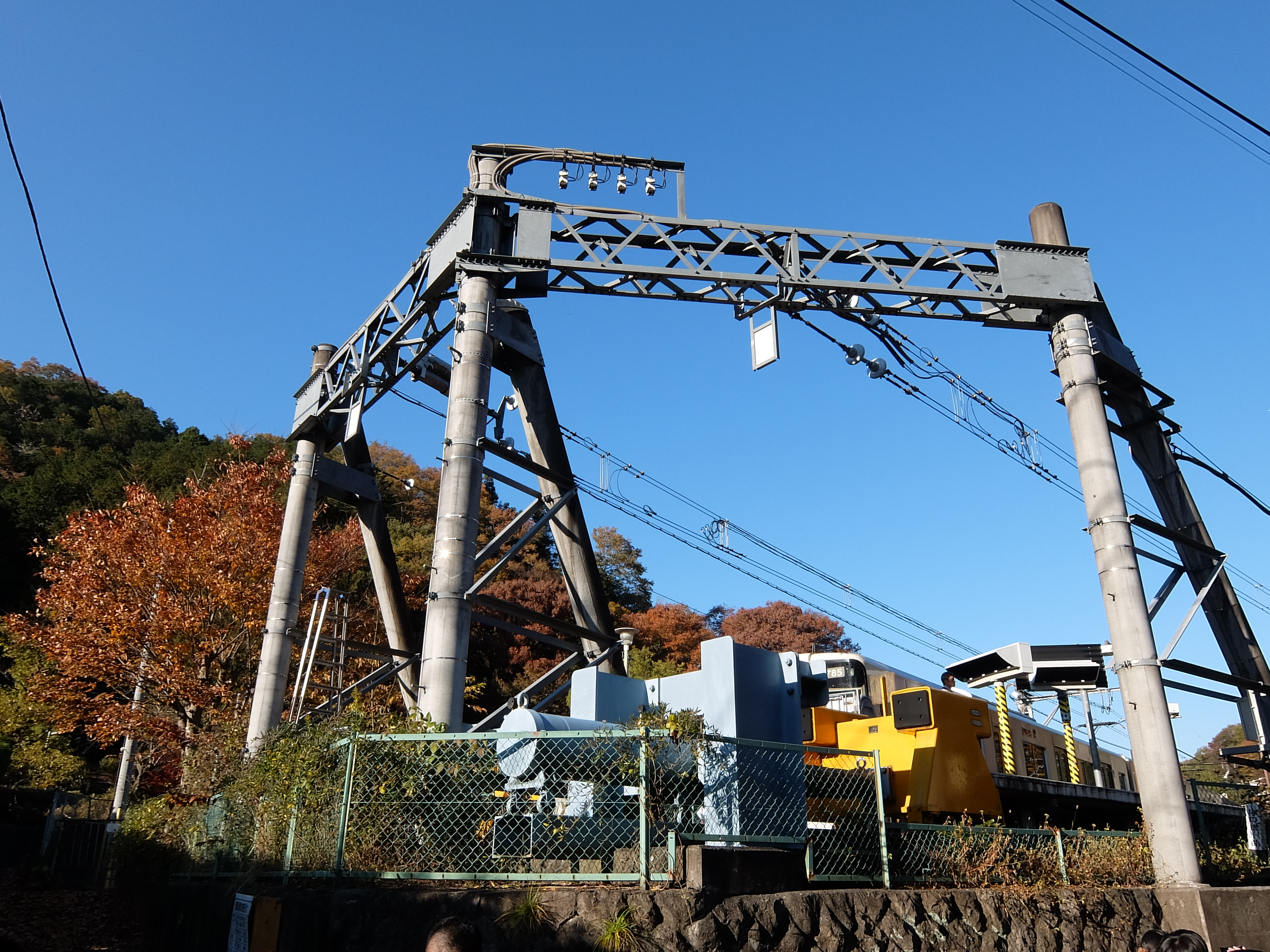
The buffer stops at the ends of the tracks in November 2014

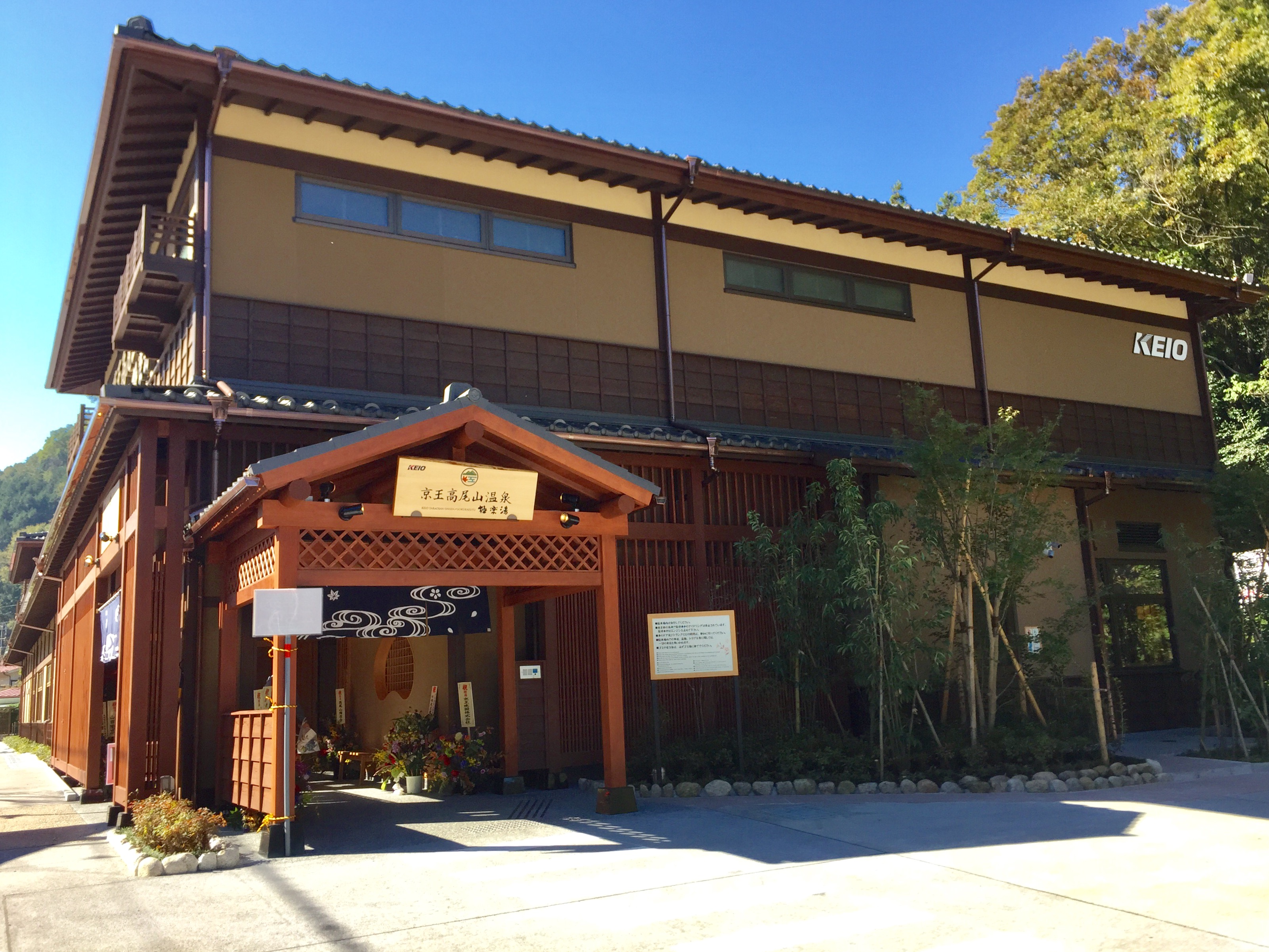
Keio Takaosan Onsen Gokurakuyu(Construction next to station)

== History ==
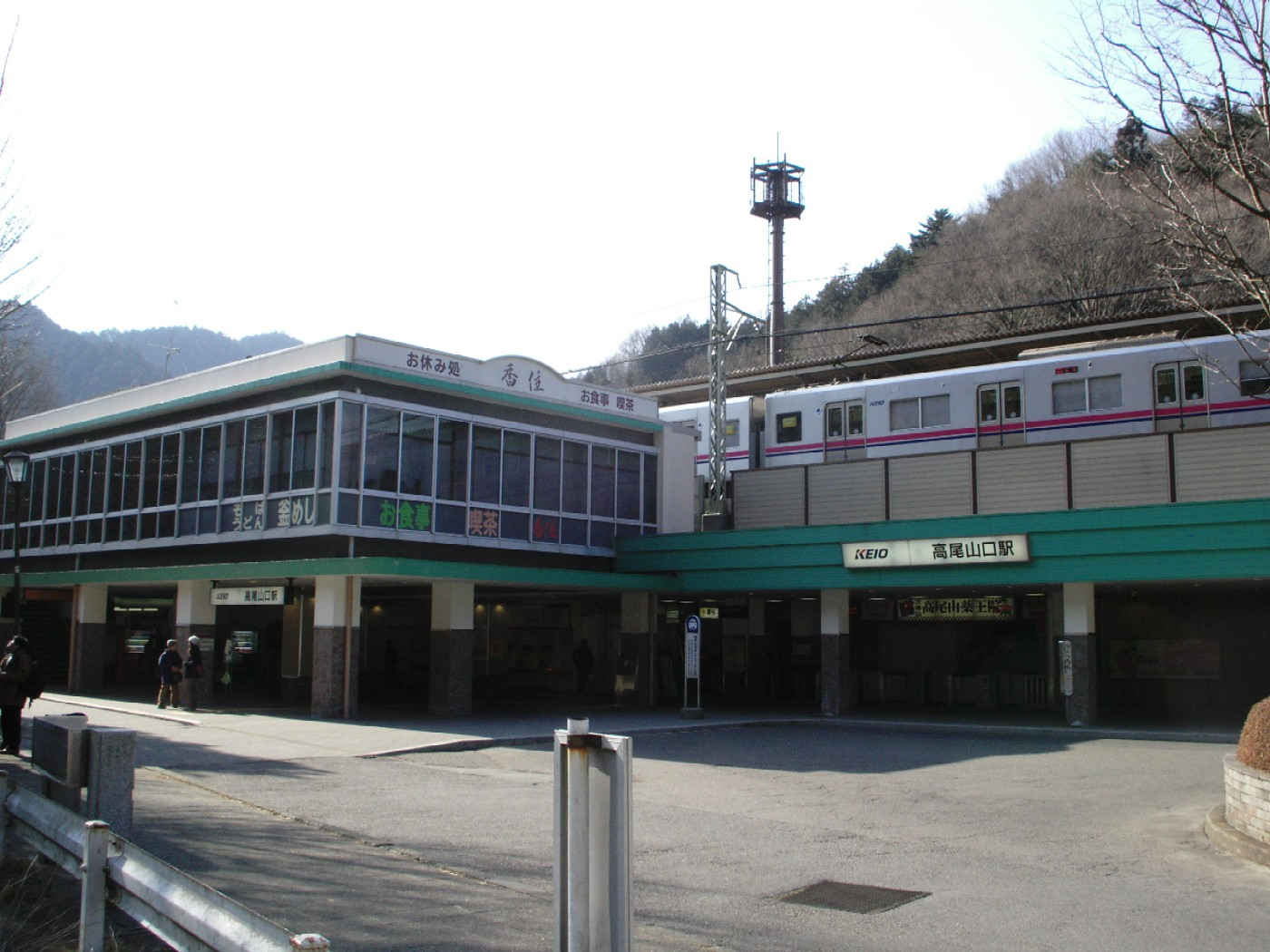
The station in February 2006 before rebuilding

The station opened on October 1, 1967.

The station building was rebuilt in 2015 using wood from local cedar trees in a redesign overseen by architect Kengo Kuma, with work completed in April 2015. The station roof is modelled after the Yakuo-in Temple complex on Mount Takao.

== Passenger statistics ==
In fiscal 2019, the station was used by an average of 10,431 passengers daily.

The passenger figures (boarding passengers only) for previous years are as shown below.

Fiscal year	daily average
2005	7,423
2010	10,268
2015	11,110

== Surrounding area ==
- Mount Takao
- National Route 20
- Kiyotaki Station on the Takaotozan Railway

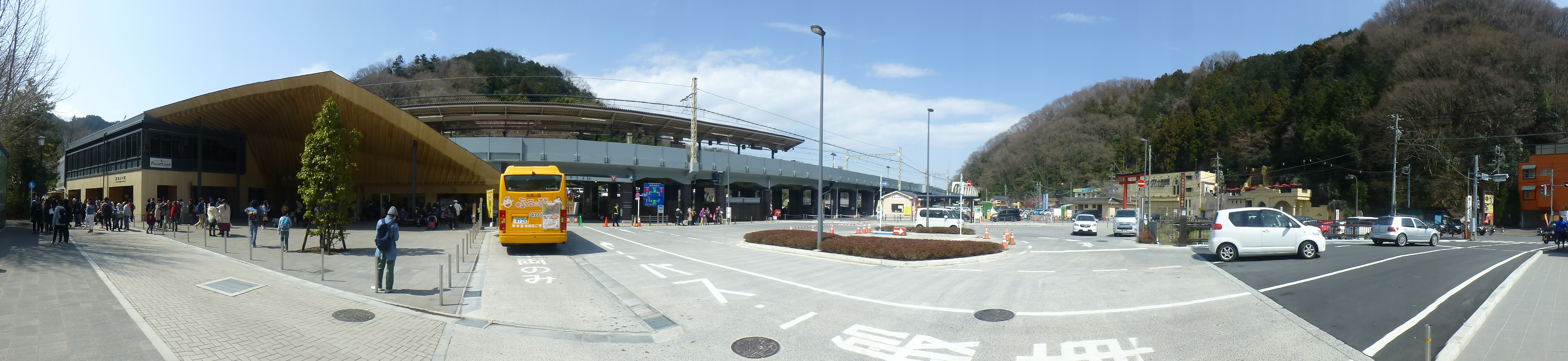
The station building and forecourt in March 2016

== See also ==
- List of railway stations in Japan
