= Sengawa Station =

Railway station in Chōfu, Tokyo, Japan

Sengawa Station 仙川駅

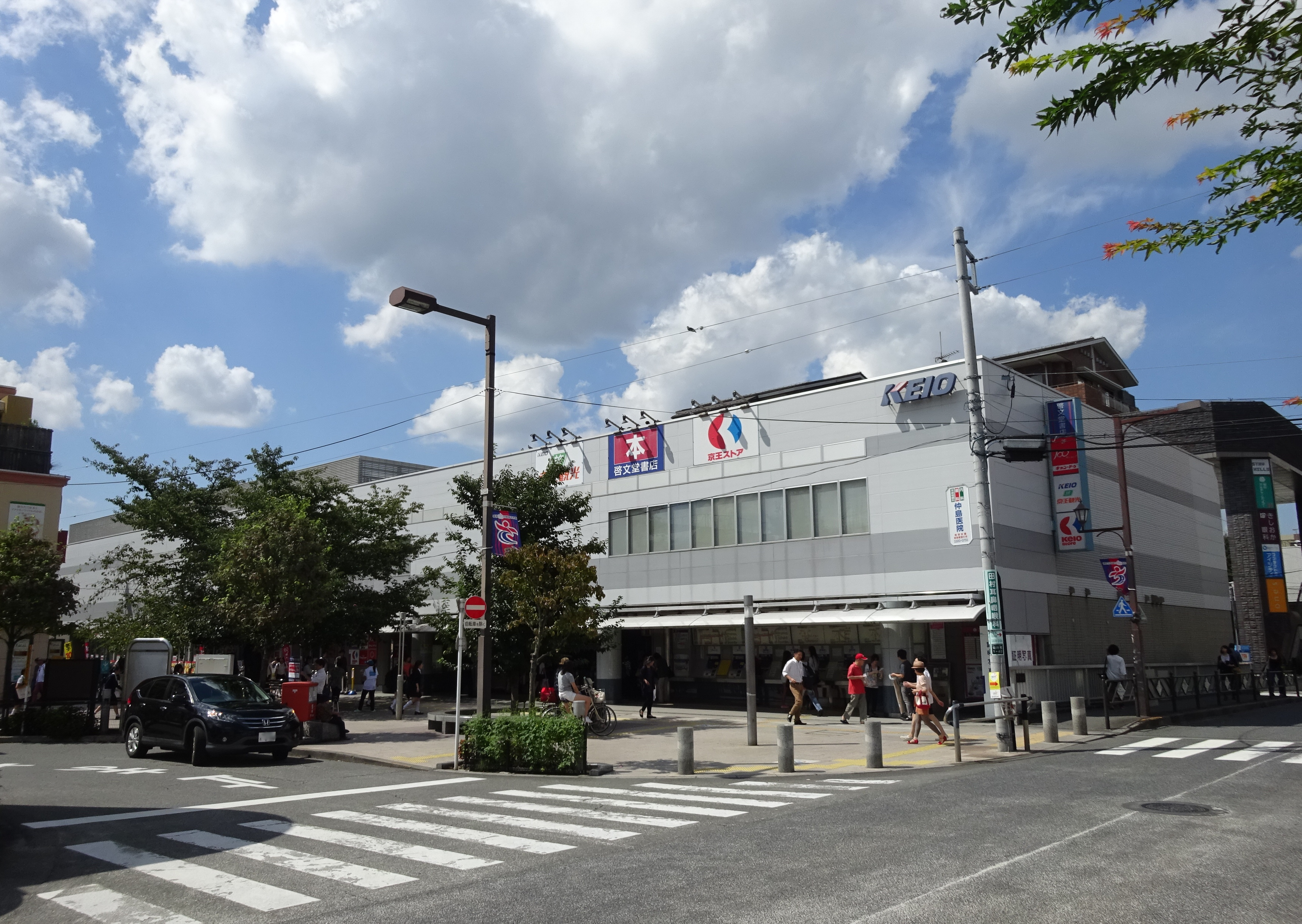
- Sengawa Station, September 2015

General information
- Location: 2-43 Sengawa-cho, Chōfu-shi, Tokyo 182-0002; Japan
- Coordinates: 35.6622°N 139.5848°E
- Operator: Keio Corporation
- Line: Keio Line
- Distance: 11.5 km from Shinjuku
- Platforms: 2 side platforms
- Tracks: 2

Other information
- Station code: KO13
- Website: Official website

History
- Opened: April 15, 1913; 113 years ago
- Former names: Shimo-Sengawa Station (to 1913)

Passengers
- FY2019: 82,714

Services
| Preceding station | Keio Corporation | Following station |
|---|---|---|
| Tsutsujigaoka towards Keiō-hachiōji | Keiō Line Semi Express Rapid Local | Chitose-karasuyama towards Shinjuku |
Location
- Location within Tokyo Location within Japan

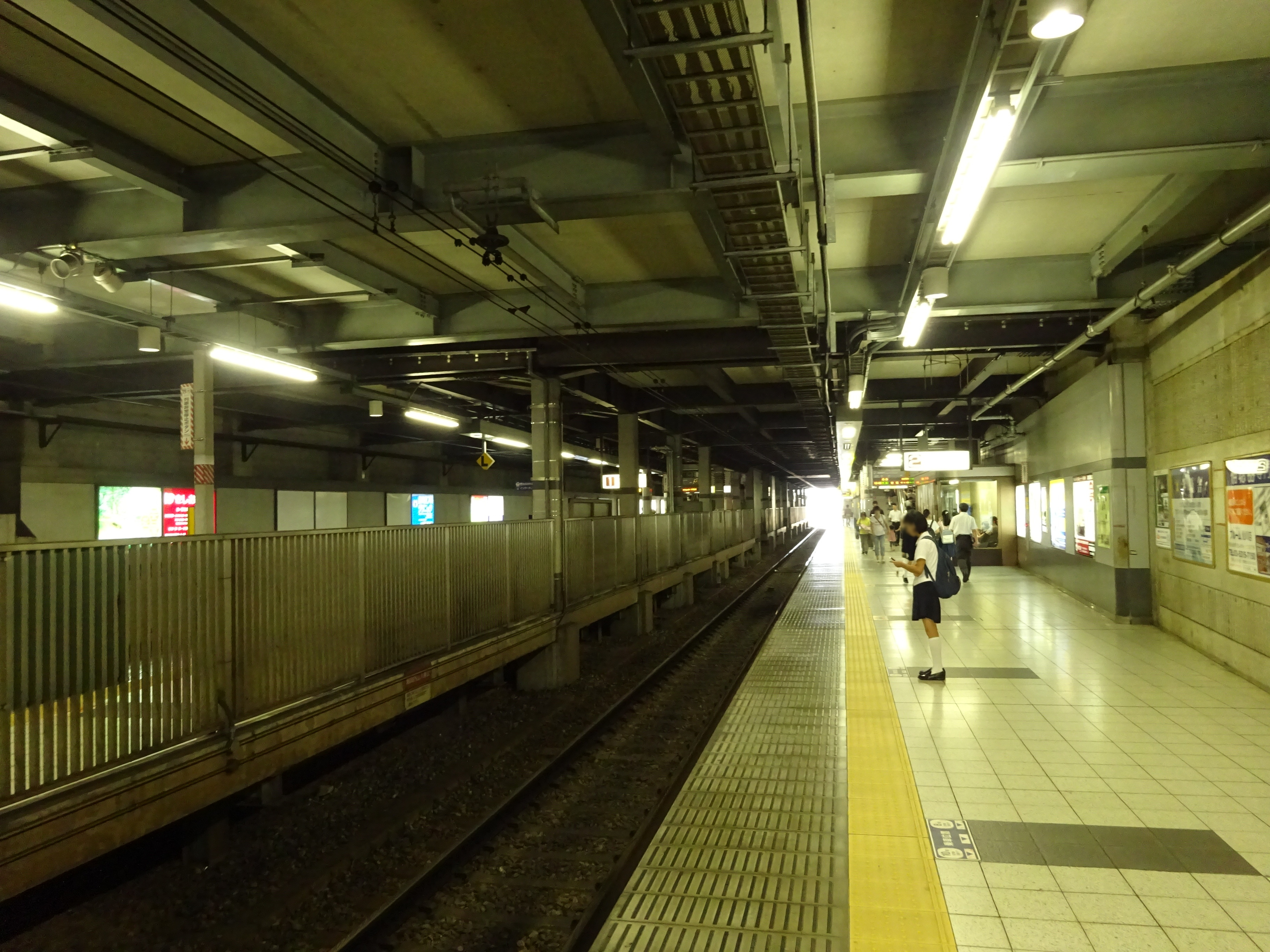
The platforms September 2015

Sengawa Station (仙川駅, Sengawa-eki) is a passenger railway station located in the city of Chōfu, Tokyo, Japan, operated by the private railway operator Keio Corporation.

== Lines ==
Sengawa Station is served by the Keio Line, and is located 11.5 kilometers from the starting point of the line at Shinjuku Station.

== Station layout ==
This station consists of two opposed semi-underground side platforms serving two tracks, with the station building located above.

=== Platforms ===
| 1 | Keiō Line | for Chōfu and Keiō-Hachiōji; Keiō Sagamihara Line for Hashimoto (via Chōfu); Keiō Takao Line for Takaosanguchi (via Kitano) |
| 2 | Keiō Line | for Meidaimae, Sasazuka, and Shinjuku; Keiō New Line for Shinjuku; Toei Shinjuku Line for Moto-Yawata |

== History ==
The station opened on April 15, 1913, initially named Shimo-Sengawa Station (下仙川駅). It was renamed in 1917.

== Passenger statistics ==
In fiscal 2019, the station was used by an average of 82,714 passengers daily.

The passenger figures (boarding passengers only) for previous years are as shown below.

| Fiscal year | daily average |
|---|---|
| 2005 | 67,958 |
| 2010 | 70,943 |
| 2015 | 77,261 |

== Surrounding area ==
- Sengawa Theater
- Shirayuri University

== See also ==
- List of railway stations in Japan
