= Shibasaki Station =

Railway station in Chōfu, Tokyo, Japan

Shibasaki Station 柴崎駅

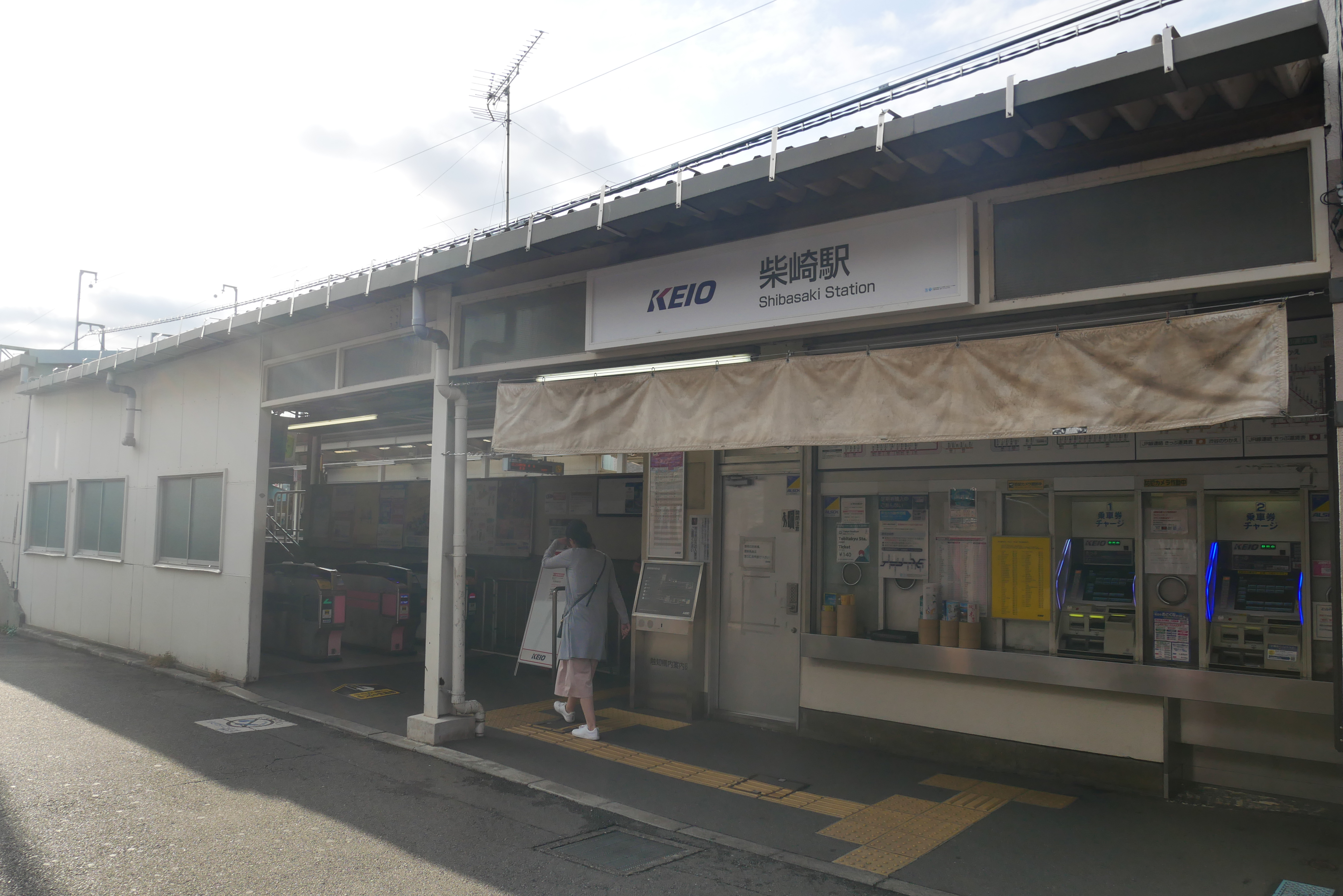
- Shibasaki Station south exit, October 2019

General information
- Location: 2-67-11 Kikunodai, Chōfu-shi, Tokyo 182-0007); Japan
- Coordinates: 35°39′15.26″N 139°34′1.61″E
- Operator: Keio Corporation
- Line: Keio Line
- Distance: 13.3 km from Shinjuku
- Platforms: 2 side platforms
- Tracks: 2

Other information
- Station code: KO15
- Website: Official website

History
- Opened: April 15, 1913; 113 years ago

Passengers
- FY2019: 18,042

Services
Preceding station	Keio Corporation	Following station
Kokuryō towards Keiō-hachiōji	Keiō Line Local	Tsutsujigaoka towards Shinjuku
Location
- Location within Tokyo Location within Japan

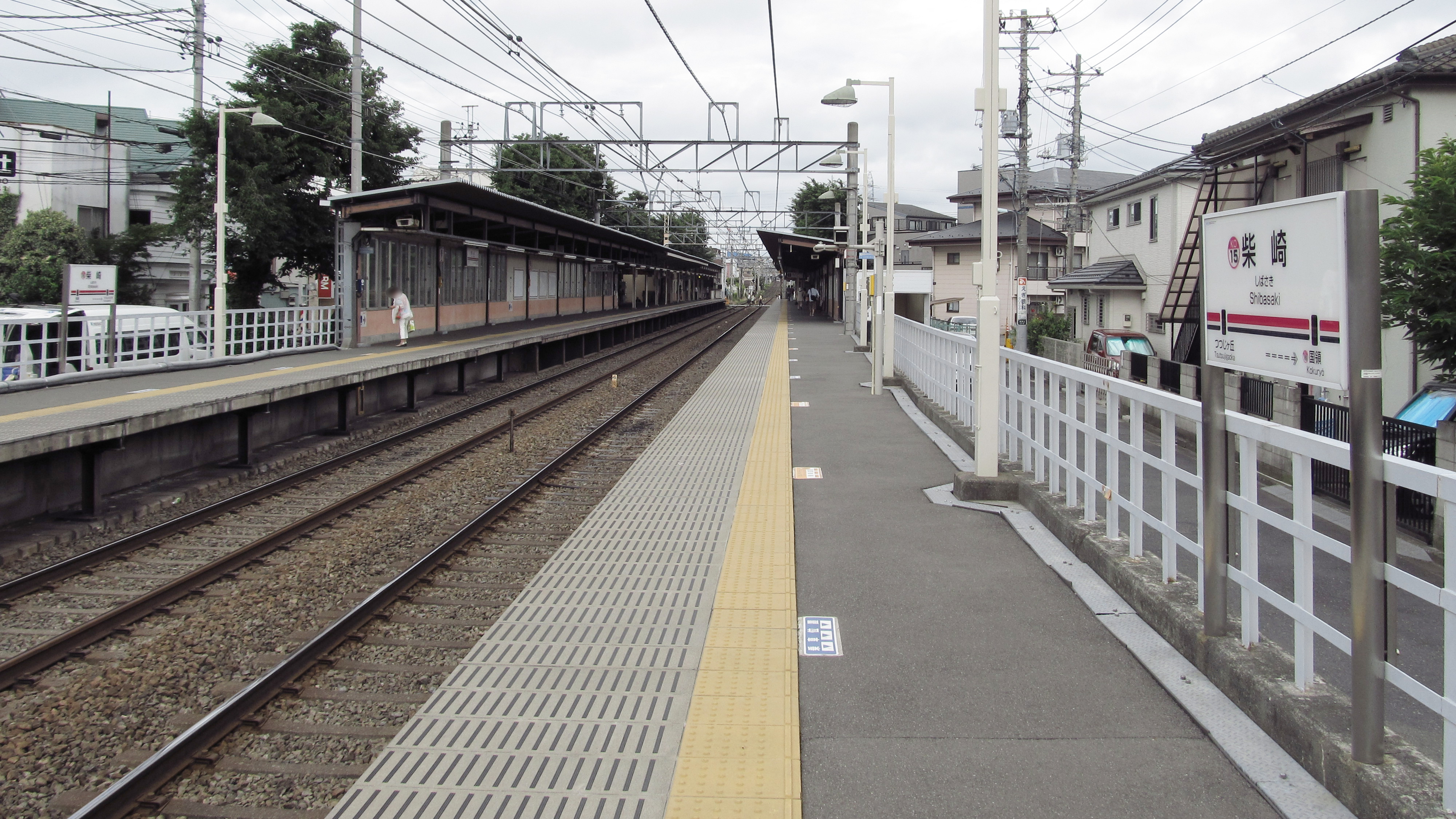
Platforms of Shibasaki Station in July 2013

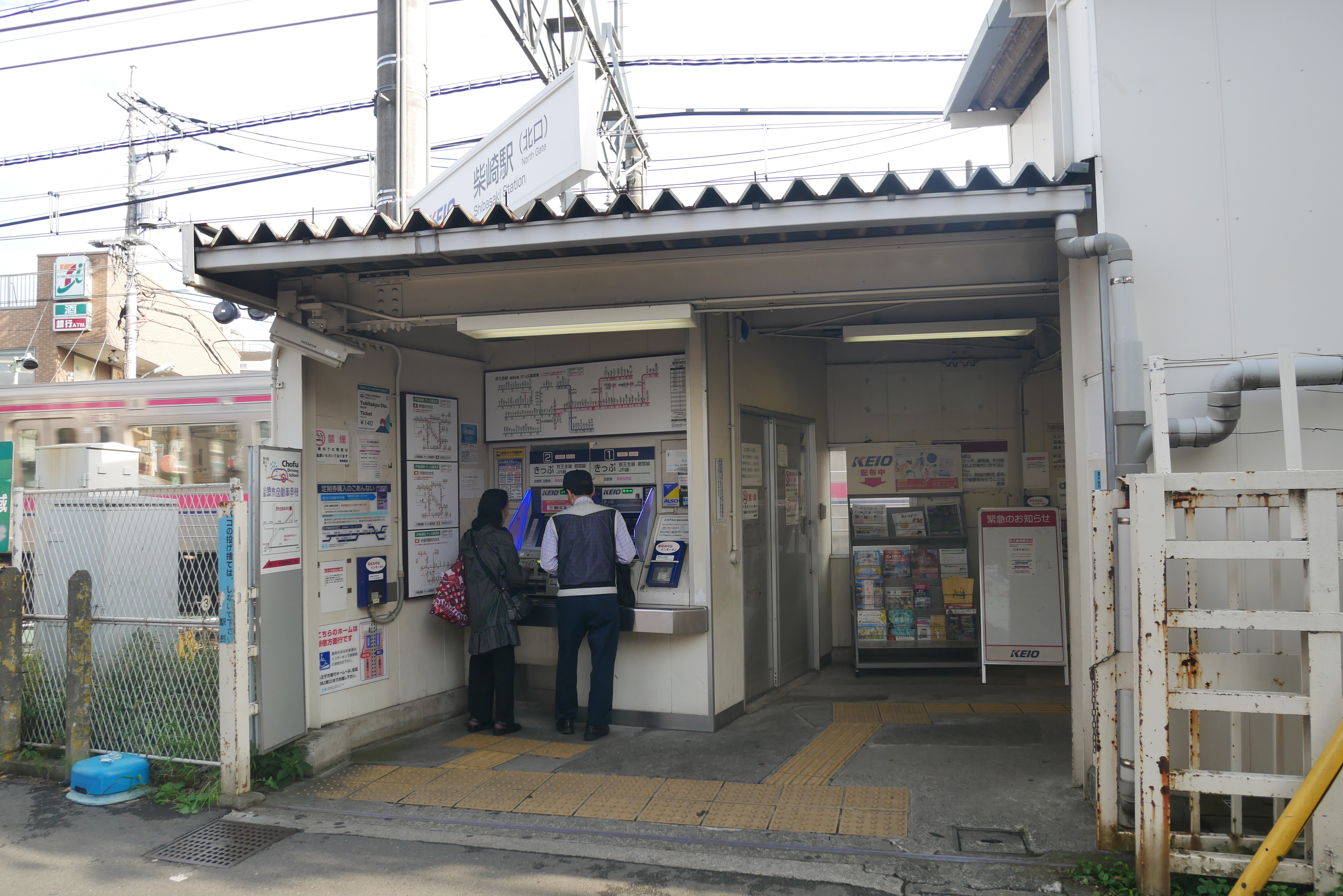
North exit, 2019

Shibasaki Station (柴崎駅, Shibasaki-eki) is a passenger railway station located in the city of Chōfu, Tokyo, Japan, operated by the private railway operator Keio Corporation.

== Lines ==
Shibasaki Station is served by the Keio Line, and is located 13.3 kilometers from the starting point of the line at Shinjuku Station.

== Station layout ==
This station consists of two ground-level opposed side platforms serving two tracks, connected to the station building by an underground passage.

=== Platforms ===
1	Keiō Line	for Chōfu and Keiō-Hachiōji; Keiō Sagamihara Line for Hashimoto (via Chōfu); Keiō Takao Line for Takaosanguchi (via Kitano)
2	Keiō Line	for Meidaimae, Sasazuka, and Shinjuku; Keiō New Line for Shinjuku; Toei Shinjuku Line for Moto-Yawata

== History ==
The station opened on April 15, 1913 and was relocated to its present location on December 17, 1927.

== Passenger statistics ==
In fiscal 2019, the station was used by an average of 18,042 passengers daily.

The passenger figures (boarding passengers only) for previous years are as shown below.

Fiscal year	daily average
2005	17,092
2010	17,484
2015	17,226

== Surrounding area ==
- National Route 20

== See also ==
- List of railway stations in Japan
