= Keiō-yomiuri-land Station =

Railway station in Inagi, Tokyo, Japan

Keiō-yomiuri-land Station 京王よみうりランド駅

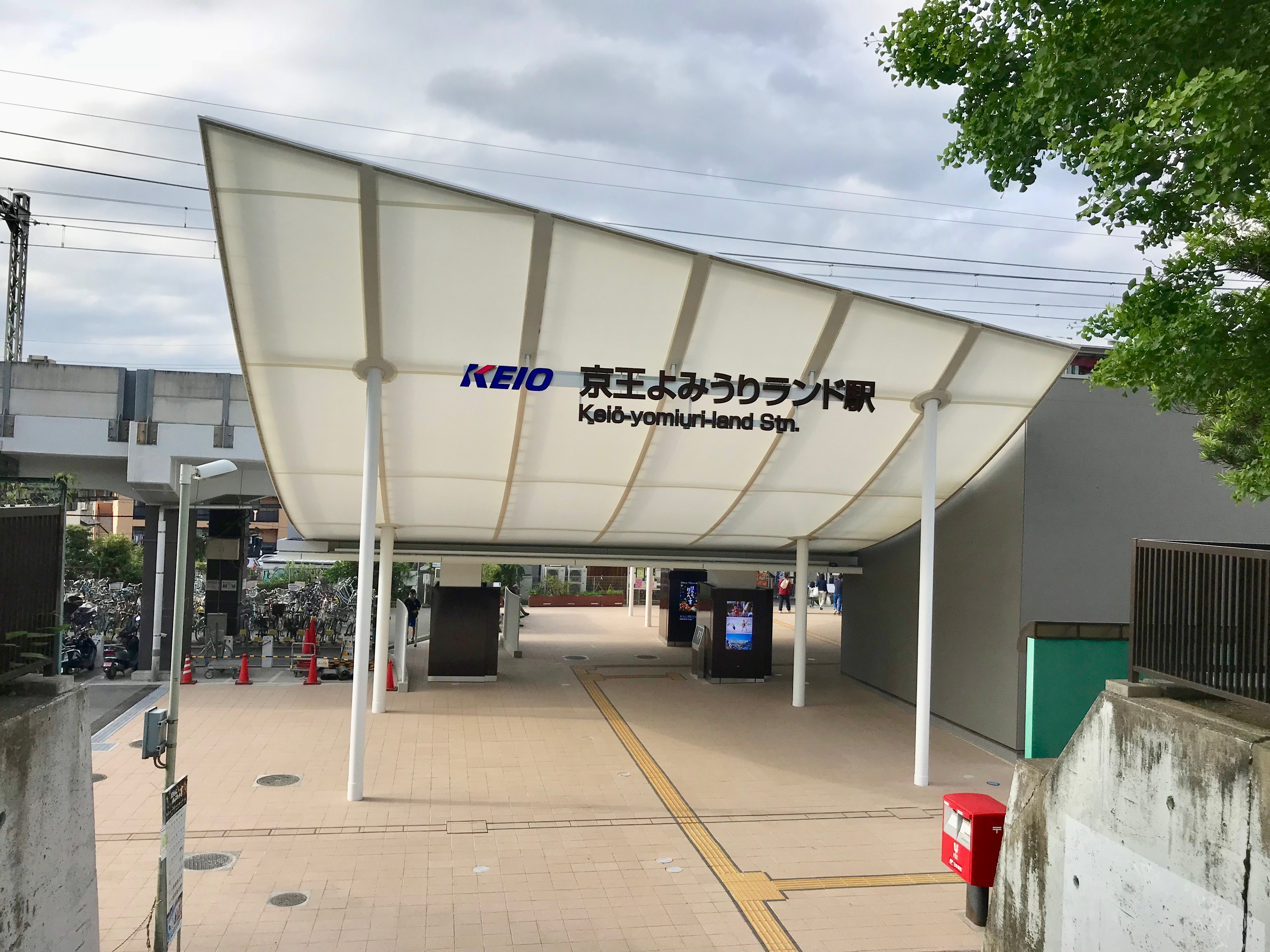
- Keiō-yomiuri-land Station, June 2018

General information
- Location: 2200-1 Yanoguchi, Inagi-shi, Tokyo 206-0812; Japan
- Coordinates: 35°37′59″N 139°31′03″E
- Operator: Keio Corporation
- Line: Keio Sagamihara Line
- Distance: 3.9 km from Chōfu
- Platforms: 2 side platforms
- Connections: Bus stop

Other information
- Station code: KO37
- Website: Official website

History
- Opened: April 1, 1971

Passengers
- FY 2019: 13,687

Services
Preceding station	Keio Corporation	Following station
Inagi towards Hashimoto	Sagamihara Line Semi Express Rapid Local	Keiō-inadazutsumi towards Chōfu
Location
- Location within Tokyo Location within Japan

Keiō-yomiuri-land Station (京王よみうりランド駅, Keiō-Yomiuri-Rando-eki) is a passenger railway station located in the city of Inagi, Tokyo, Japan, operated by the private railway company, Keio Corporation.

== Lines ==
Keiō-Tamagawa Station is served by the Keiō Sagamihara Line, and is 3.9 kilometers from the terminus of the line at Chōfu and 19.4 kilometers from Shinjuku Station in downtown Tokyo.

== Station Layout ==
This station consists of two opposed elevated side platforms serving two tracks, with the station building located underneath.

=== Platforms ===
1	■ Keio Sagamihara Line	Hashimoto
2	■ Keiō Sagamihara Line	Chōfu

== History ==
The station opened on April 1, 1971.

== Passenger statistics ==
In fiscal 2019, the station was used by an average of 13,687 passengers daily.

The passenger figures for previous years are as shown below.

Fiscal year	Daily average
2005	10,505
2010	11,078
2015	12,968

== Surrounding area ==
- Yomiuriland

It takes about 5 minutes from here to the entrance of the land by Gondola which is named as Skyshuttle at 300 yen on one trip.

== See also ==
- List of railway stations in Japan
