= Tsutsujigaoka Station (Tokyo) =

Railway station in Chōfu, Tokyo, Japan

Tsutsujigaoka Station つつじヶ丘駅

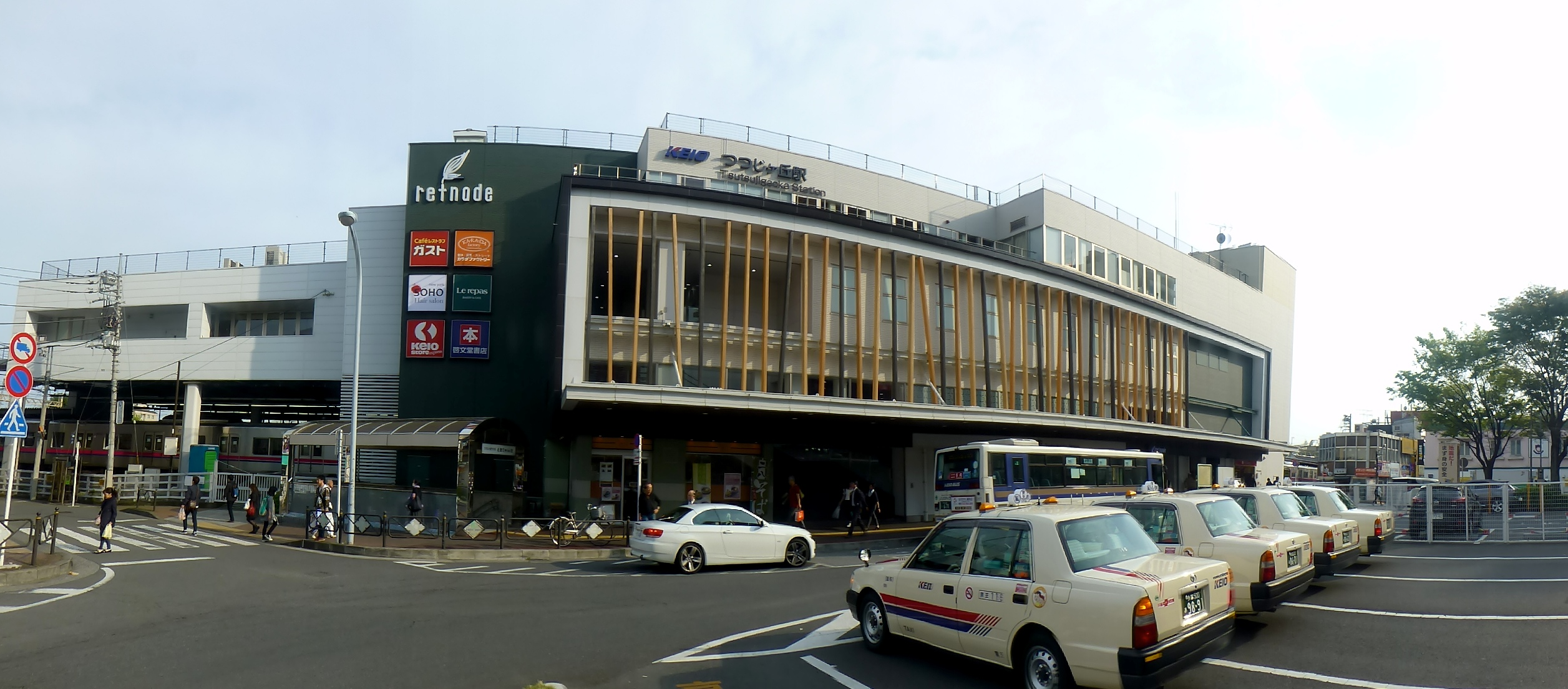
- Tsutsujigaoka Station (north side), April 2016

General information
- Location: 3-35-1 Nishi-Tsutsujigaoka, Chōfu-shi, Tokyo 182-0006; Japan
- Coordinates: 35°39′29″N 139°34′30″E
- Operator: Keio Corporation
- Line: Keio Line
- Distance: 12.5 km from Shinjuku
- Platforms: 2 island platforms

Other information
- Station code: KO14
- Website: Official website

History
- Opened: April 15, 1913; 113 years ago
- Former names: Kaneko Station (to 1957)

Passengers
- FY2019: 45,169

Services
Preceding station	Keio Corporation	Following station
Chōfu towards Keiō-hachiōji	Keiō Line Express	Chitose-karasuyama towards Shinjuku
Chōfu towards Keiō-hachiōji	Keiō Line Semi Express Rapid	Sengawa towards Shinjuku
Shibasaki towards Keiō-hachiōji	Keiō Line Local	Sengawa towards Shinjuku
Location
- Location within Tokyo Location within Japan

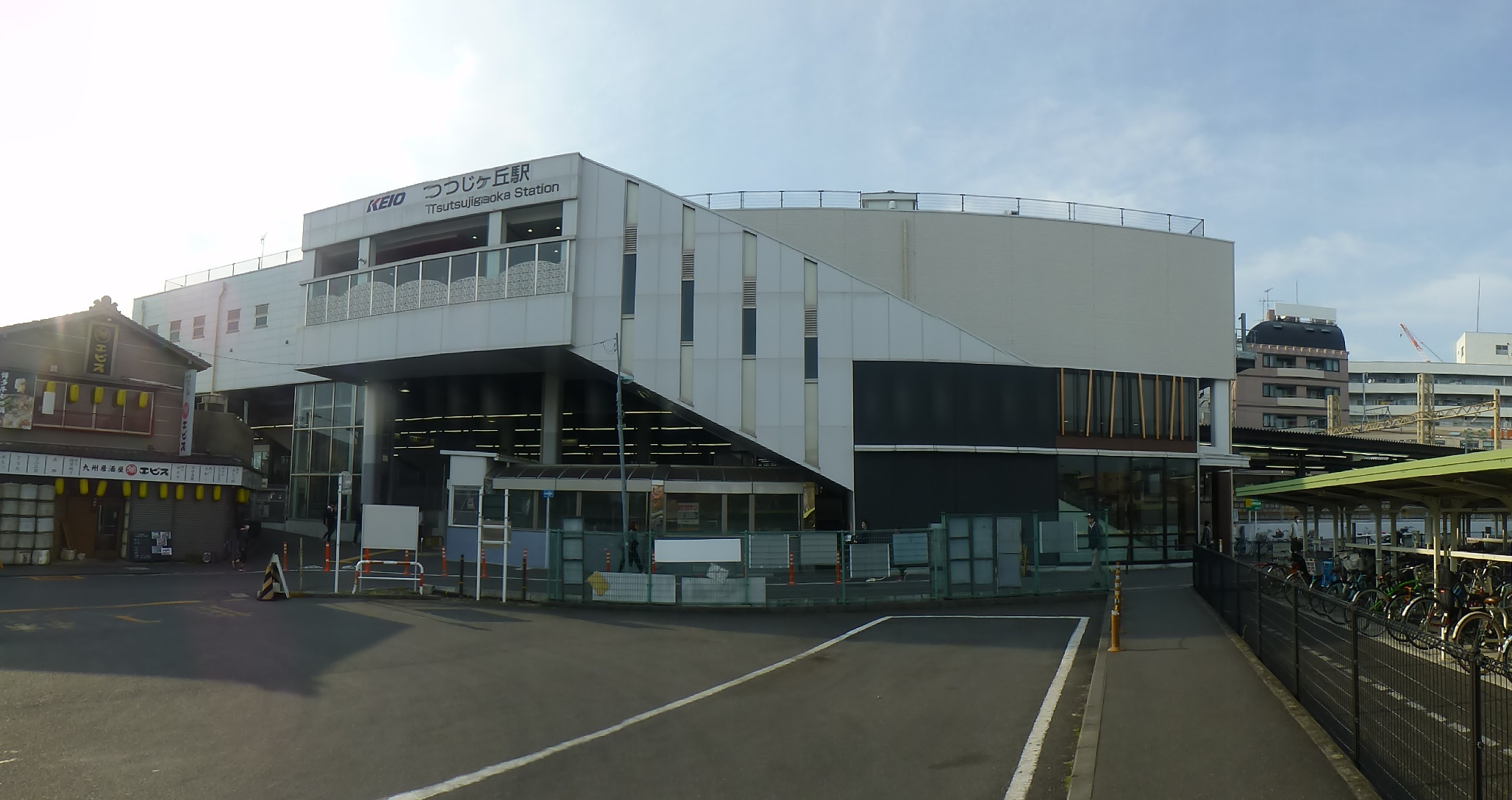
South exit, 2016

Tsutsujigaoka Station (つつじヶ丘駅, Tsutsujigaoka-eki) is a passenger railway station located in the city of Chōfu, Tokyo, Japan, operated by the private railway operator Keio Corporation.

== Lines ==
Tsutsujigaoka Station is served by the Keio Line, and is located 12.5 kilometers from the starting point of the line at Shinjuku Station.

== Station layout ==
This station consists of two island platforms serving four tracks, with an elevated station building located above the tracks and platforms.

=== Platforms ===
1, 2	Keiō Line	for Chōfu and Keiō-Hachiōji; Keiō Sagamihara Line for Hashimoto (via Chōfu); Keiō Takao Line for Takaosanguchi (via Kitano)
3, 4	Keiō Line	for Meidaimae, Sasazuka, and Shinjuku; Keiō New Line for Shinjuku; Toei Shinjuku Line for Moto-Yawata

== History ==
The station opened on April 15, 1913 as Kaneko Station (金子駅). It was renamed to its present name in 1957.

== Passenger statistics ==
In fiscal 2019, the station was used by an average of 45,169 passengers daily.

The passenger figures (boarding passengers only) for previous years are as shown below.

Fiscal year	daily average
2005	44,348
2010	44,572
2015	45,540

== Surrounding area ==
- Jindai Post Office

== See also ==
- List of railway stations in Japan
