= Jindai Botanical Garden =

Botanical garden in Tokyo, Japan

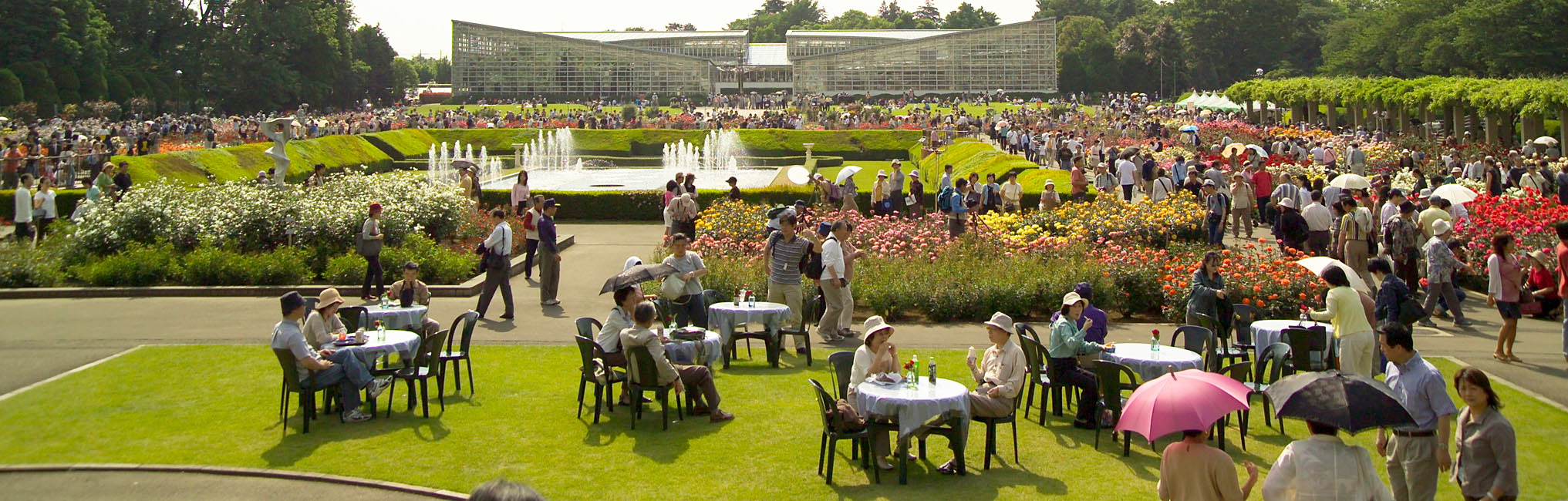
- The rose garden
- Interactive map of Jindai Botanical Garden
- Location: Chōfu, Tokyo, Japan
- Coordinates: 35.671277°N 139.548350°E
- Area: 489,731 square metres (121.015 acres)
- Created: 20 October 1961
- Public transit: Chōfu Station

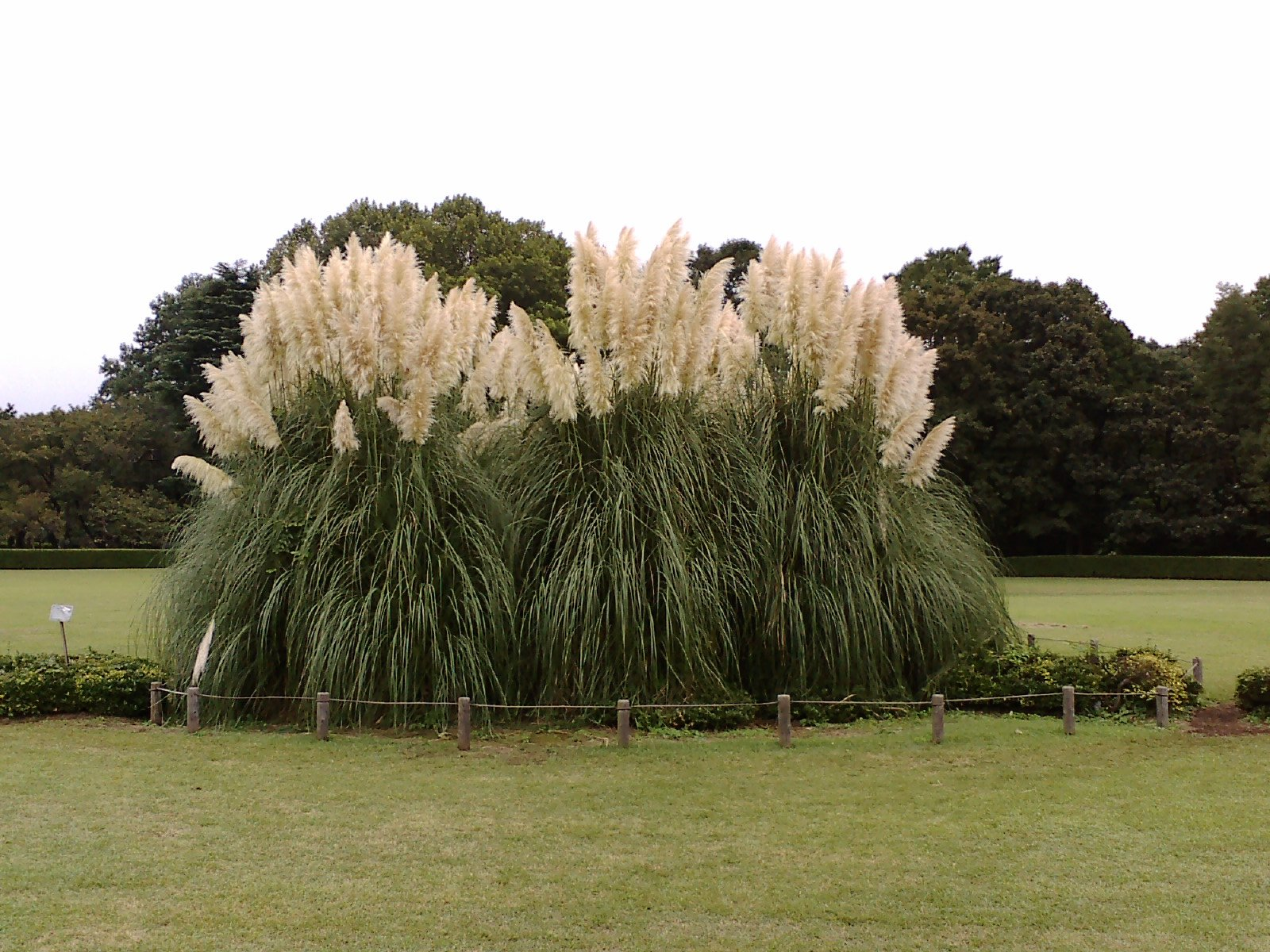
Big tuft of pampas grass in 大芝生 zone of Jindai Botanical Garden, Height four meters and diameter seven meters, over 40 years old as of 2007.

The Jindai Botanical Garden (神代植物公園, Jindai shokubutsu kōen) is at the edge of the Musashino plateau just above Jindaiji Temple in Chōfu, Tokyo, Japan. It extends across 425,433 square meters, and each of its thirty areas features varieties of one kind of plant. Displays of ume, cherries, azalea, dogwood, peonies, roses, wisteria or other can be seen every month. In front of the temple below there is also a wetland annex for aquatic plants, where irises are cultivated.

The garden has 100,000 trees and shrubs representing approximately 4,500 varieties, each with an identifying label. The park has a plant protection program to preserve endangered Japanese species and exhibitions and activities related to gardening for the benefit of local citizens. Just outside the rear gate there is an area where some plants are sold.

The site of Jindai Botanical Garden was once part of a medieval fortress said to date from 1537. Later it was a nursery that supplied trees for Tokyo's streets. After the war it was opened to the public as Jindai ryokuchi (緑地, green area) and in 1961 it was given its current name as it became the first botanical garden in Tokyo.

A large greenhouse was built in 1984 holding the collection of tropical plants. In one section of the greenhouse is the lily pond.

Downhill from the garden is Jindaiji Temple, the second oldest Buddhist temple in Tokyo.

== Location and access ==
The garden is at Jindaiji Motomachi 5-31-10, Chōfu City, Tokyo 182-0017

From bus stop 14 at the north exit of Chōfu Station on the Keiō Line, the visitor takes an Odakyū bus number 14 (destination Mitaka or Kichijōji), and gets off at Jindaiji Shokubutsu Kōen Mae. (This takes about ten minutes.) The temple is on the left. Journey time is about 10 mins.

As of February 2024, admission costs ¥500 for adults, ¥200 for children, and ¥250 for seniors. The garden is closed on Mondays (other than National holidays, when it is closed the day after). Its opening hours are 09:30 to 17:00; the ticket window closes at 16:00.

== See also ==
- List of botanical gardens in Japan
