= Nishi-chōfu Station =

Railway station in Chōfu, Tokyo, Japan

Nishi-chōfu Station 西調布駅

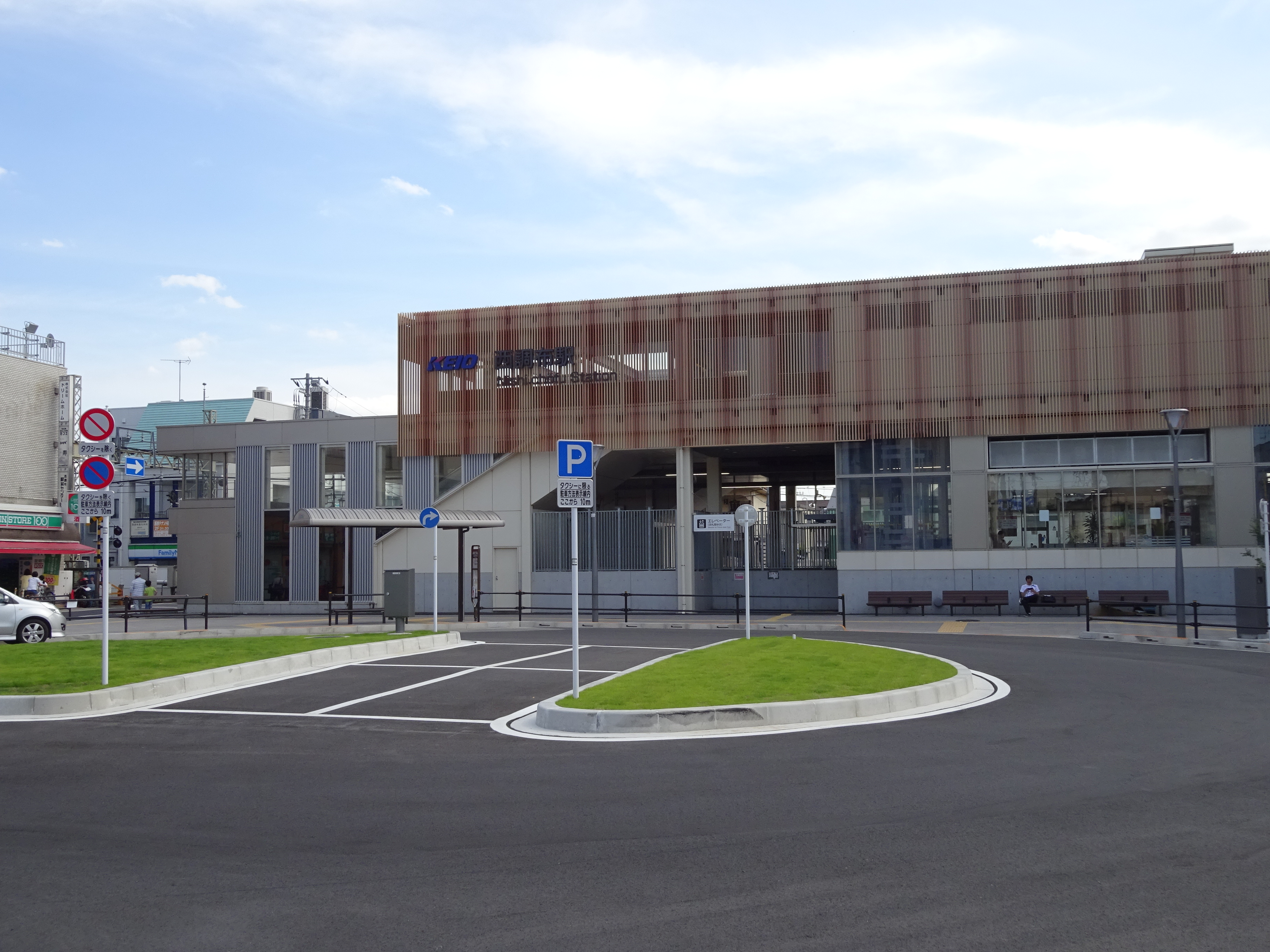
- Nishi-chōfu Station north exit, July 2017

General information
- Location: 1-25-17 Kami-Ishihara, Chōfu-shi, Tokyo 182-0035; Japan
- Coordinates: 35.657°N 139.5302°E
- Operator: Keio Corporation
- Line: Keio Line
- Distance: 17.0 km from Shinjuku
- Platforms: 2 side platform
- Tracks: 2

Other information
- Station code: KO19
- Website: Official website

History
- Opened: 1 September 1916; 109 years ago
- Former names: Kami-Ishihara Station (to 1959)

Passengers
- FY2019: 17,610

Services
Preceding station	Keio Corporation	Following station
Tobitakyū towards Keiō-hachiōji	Keiō Line Rapid Local	Chōfu towards Shinjuku
Location
- Location within Tokyo Location within Japan

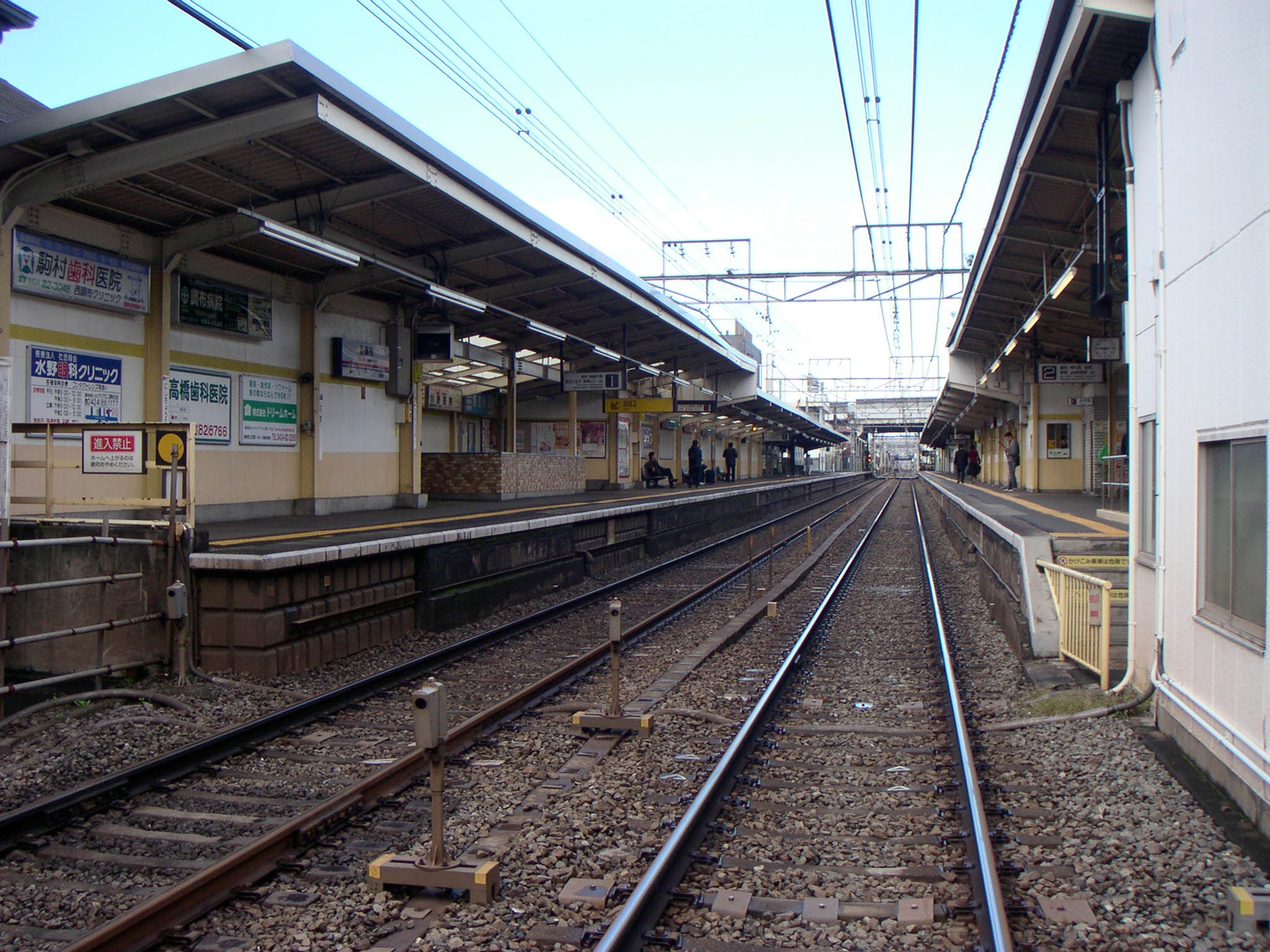
Nishi-chōfu Station tracks, November 2005

Nishi-chōfu Station (西調布駅, Nishi-chōfu-eki) is a passenger railway station located in the city of Chōfu, Tokyo, Japan, operated by the private railway operator Keio Corporation.

== Lines ==
Nishi-chōfu Station is served by the Keio Line, and is located 17.0 kilometers from the starting point of the line at Shinjuku Station.

== Station layout ==
This station consists of two ground-level opposed side platforms serving two tracks, connected to the station building by a footbridge.

=== Platforms ===
1	Keiō Line	for Keiō-Hachiōji; Keiō Dōbutsuen Line for Tama-Dōbutsukōen (via Takahatafudō); Keiō Takao Line for Takaosanguchi (via Kitano)
2	Keiō Line	for Chōfu, Meidaimae, Sasazuka, and Shinjuku; Toei Shinjuku Line for Moto-Yawata

== History ==
The station opened on 1 September 1916 as Kami-Ishihara Station (上石原駅), and was renamed to its present name on 1 June 1959.

== Passenger statistics ==
In fiscal 2019, the station was used by an average of 17,610 passengers daily.

The passenger figures (boarding passengers only) for previous years are as shown below.

Fiscal year	daily average
2005	15,635
2010	15,380
2015	16,764

== Surrounding area ==
- Kami-Ishihara Post Office
- Ishihara Elementary School

== See also ==
- List of railway stations in Japan
