= Chōfu =

Chōfu 調布市
- City
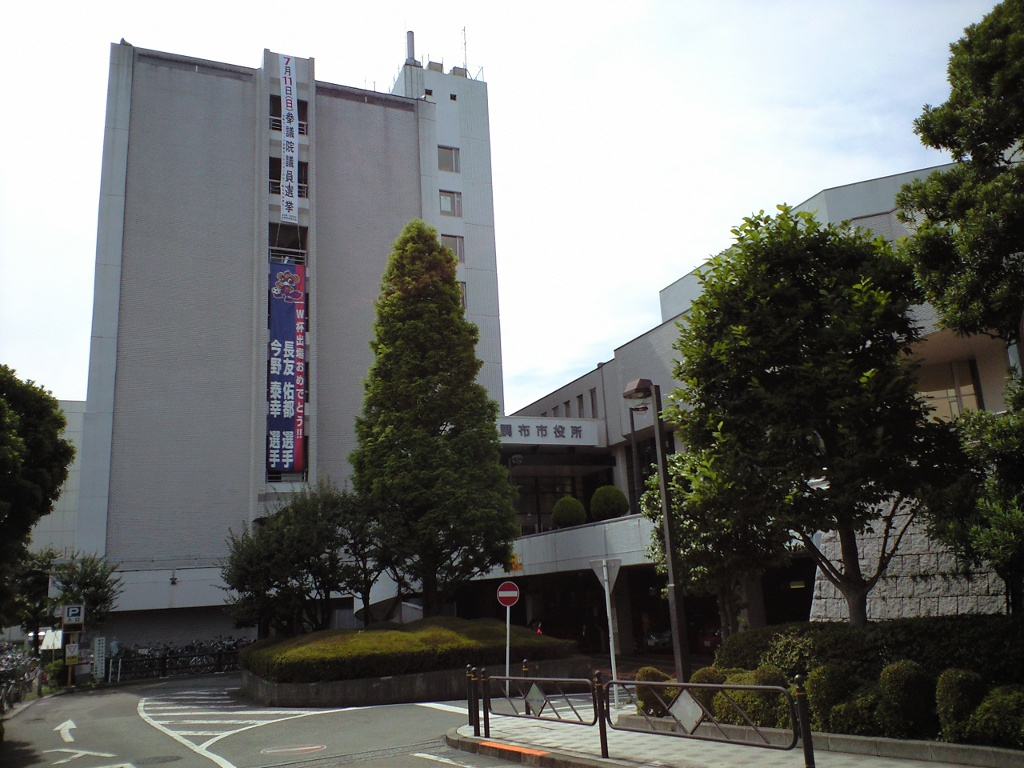
- Chōfu City Hall

- Flag Seal

- Location of Chōfu in Tokyo Metropolis

- Coordinates: 35°39′2.21″N 139°32′26.4″E
- Country: Japan
- Region: Kantō
- Prefecture: Tokyo
- First official recorded: 80 AD (official)
- Town settled: April 1, 1889
- City settled: April 1, 1955

Government
  - Mayor: Akihiro Hayashi (林明裕) - from July 2026

Area
  - Total: 21.58 km^{2} (8.33 sq mi)

Population (April 2021)
  - Total: 238,087
  - Density: 11,030/km^{2} (28,570/sq mi)
- Time zone: UTC+9 (Japan Standard Time)
- City symbols
  - Tree: Cinnamomum camphora
  - Flower: Lagerstroemia indica
  - Bird: Japanese white-eye
- Phone number: 042-481-7111
- Address: 2-35-1 Kojima-cho, Chōfu-shi, Tokyo-to 182-8511
- Website: Official website

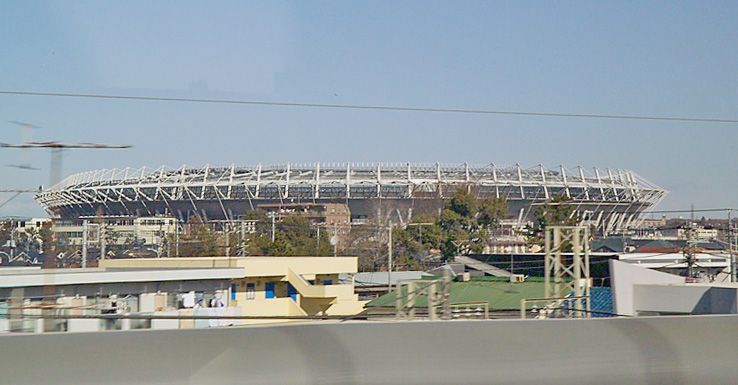
Ajinomoto Stadium

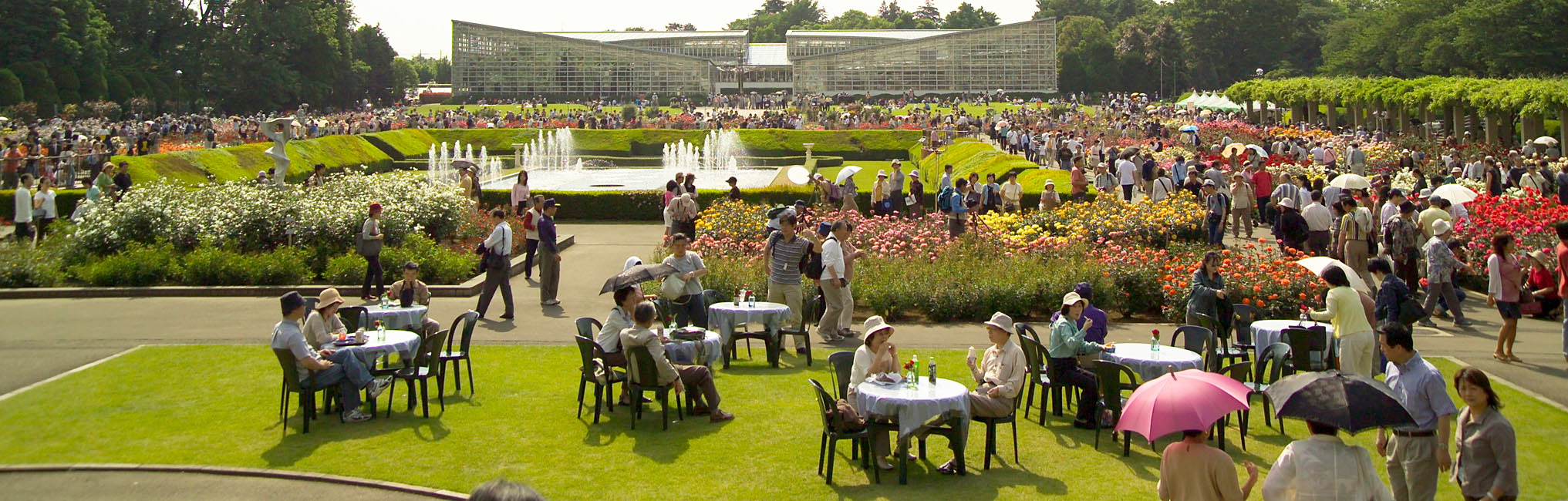
The Tokyo Metropolitan Government Jindai Botanical Garden

Chōfu (調布市, Chōfu-shi) is a city in the western side of Tokyo Metropolis, Japan. As of 1 April 2021, the city had an estimated population of 238,087, and a population density of 11,000 per km^{2}. The total area of the city is 21.58 square kilometres (8.33 sq mi).

== Geography ==
Chōfu is approximately in the south-center of Tokyo Metropolis, approximately 20 kilometers west from downtown Tokyo, on the Musashino Terrace bordered by the floodplains of the Tama River and the Iruma River.

=== Surrounding municipalities ===
Tokyo Metropolis

- Setagaya
- Mitaka
- Fuchū
- Koganei
- Komae
- Inagi

Kanagawa Prefecture

- Kawasaki

=== Climate ===
Chōfu has a humid subtropical climate (Köppen Cfa) characterized by warm summers and cool winters with light to no snowfall. The average annual temperature in Chōfu is 14.5 °C. The average annual rainfall is 1647 mm with September as the wettest month. The temperatures are highest on average in August, at around 26.0 °C, and lowest in January, at around 3.1 °C.

== Demographics ==
Per Japanese census data, the population of Chōfu has grown steadily over the past century, and increased especially rapidly in the 1950s and 1960s.

Historical population
Year	Pop.	±%
1920	8,619	—
1930	11,398	+32.2%
1940	17,825	+56.4%
1950	34,865	+95.6%
1960	68,621	+96.8%
1970	157,488	+129.5%
1980	180,548	+14.6%
1990	197,677	+9.5%
2000	204,759	+3.6%
2010	223,593	+9.2%
2020	242,614	+8.5%

== History ==
The area of present-day Chōfu has been inhabited since Japanese Paleolithic times, and numerous remains from the Jōmon, Yayoi and Kofun periods have been discovered. During the Nara period, it became part of ancient Musashi Province. During the Sengoku period, the area was frequently contested between the Later Hōjō clan and Uesugi clan. During the Edo period, the area prospered as a post station on the Kōshū Kaidō and as a center for sericulture. The origin of the city name "Chōfu" comes from the fact that it was allowed to pay taxes in cloth instead of in rice. There were two other places named Chōfu along the Tama River: west of the current city was Chōfu Village, now part of Ome; and to the east was Higashi Chōfu Village, now part of Ota Ward.

In the post-Meiji Restoration cadastral reform of April 1, 1889, Chōfu Town and neighboring Jindai Village were established within Kanagawa Prefecture. The entire district was transferred to the control of Tokyo Metropolis on April 1, 1893. Jindai was elevated to town status on November 3, 1952, and merged with Chōfu Town on April 1, 1955, to form the present city of Chōfu.

== Government ==
Chōfu has a mayor-council form of government with a directly elected mayor and a unicameral city council of 28 members. Chōfu, together with the city of Komae, contributes three members to the Tokyo Metropolitan Assembly. In terms of national politics, the city is part of Tokyo 22nd district of the lower house of the Diet of Japan.

== Economy ==
Chōfu is primarily a regional commercial center, and a bedroom community ("bed town" ベッドタウン, beddotaun) for central Tokyo. The headquarters of the Japan Aerospace Exploration Agency (JAXA) are also located in the city.

== Transportation ==
=== Railway ===
Keio Corporation - Keiō Line

- Sengawa – Tsutsujigaoka – Shibasaki – Kokuryō – Fuda – Chōfu – Nishi-Chōfu – Tobitakyū

Keio Corporation - Keiō Sagamihara Line

- Chōfu – Keiō-tamagawa

=== Highway ===
- Chūō Expressway
- National Route 20 (Kōshū Kaidō)

=== Airport ===
- Chofu Airport - domestic flights to Izu Islands.

== Education ==
Colleges and universities:

- University of Electro-Communications
- Tokyo University of Foreign Studies
- Toho Gakuen School of Music
- Shirayuri Women's University
- Jikei University School of Medicine

Primary and secondary education

- Chōfu has 20 public elementary schools and eight public junior high schools operated by the city government and two private elementary schools and three private middle schools. The city has four public high schools operated by the Tokyo Metropolitan Board of Education and three private high schools.

Metropolitan high schools:

- Chofu-Kita High School
- Chofu-Minami High School
- Jindai High School
- Nogyo High School

Municipal junior high schools:

- Chofu Junior High School (調布中学校)
- Jindai Junior High School (神代中学校)
- No. 3 Junior High School (第三中学校)
- No. 4 Junior High School (第四中学校)
- No. 5 Junior High School (第五中学校)
- No. 6 Junior High School (第六中学校)
- No. 7 Junior High School (第七中学校)
- No. 8 Junior High School (第八中学校)

Municipal elementary schools:

- No. 1 Elementary School (第一小学校)
- No. 2 Elementary School (第二小学校)
- No. 3 Elementary School (第三小学校)
- Chowa Elementary School (調和小学校)
- Fuda Elementary School (布田小学校)
- Fujimidai Elementary School (富士見台小学校)
- Ishiwara Elementary School (石原小学校)
- Jindaiji Elementary School (深大寺小学校)
- Kashiwano Elementary School (柏野小学校)
- Kitanodai Elementary School (北ノ台小学校)
- Kokuryo Elementary School (国領小学校)
- Midorigaoka Elementary School (緑ヶ丘小学校)
- Somechi Elementary School (染地小学校)
- Sugimori Elementary School (杉森小学校)
- Takizaka Elementary School (滝坂小学校)
- Tamagawa Elementary School (多摩川小学校)
- Tobitakyu Elementary School (飛田給小学校)
- Uenohara Elementary School (上ノ原小学校)
- Wakaba Elementary School (若葉小学校)
- Yakumodai Elementary School (八雲台小学校)

Private schools:

- The American School in Japan, an international school, also has a campus.
- Chofu Elementary School (former US Air Force Base school)
- Chofu High School (former US Air Force Base school)
- Dalton Tokyo Junior & Senior High School
- Koka Gakuen Junior & Senior High School for Girls
- Meiji University Meiji High School and Meiji Junior High School
- Toho Girls' Junior and Senior High School

== Local attractions ==
- Fudaten Shrine
- Jindai Botanical Garden
- Jindai Temple - famous for many soba noodle restaurants around the temple.
- Nogawa Park
- Sengawa Theater
- Tokyo Stadium (commonly known as Ajinomoto Stadium) in Chōfu hosts soccer games for two J.League teams: FC Tokyo and Tokyo Verdy.

The Chōfu City Fireworks Festival, attended by as many as 300,000 people along the banks of the Tamagawa River.

Chōfu has a large cultural centre that supports many groups encouraging the integration of foreigners into Japanese society, providing free Japanese, Shodo, Ikebana, Karate (and many other) lessons.

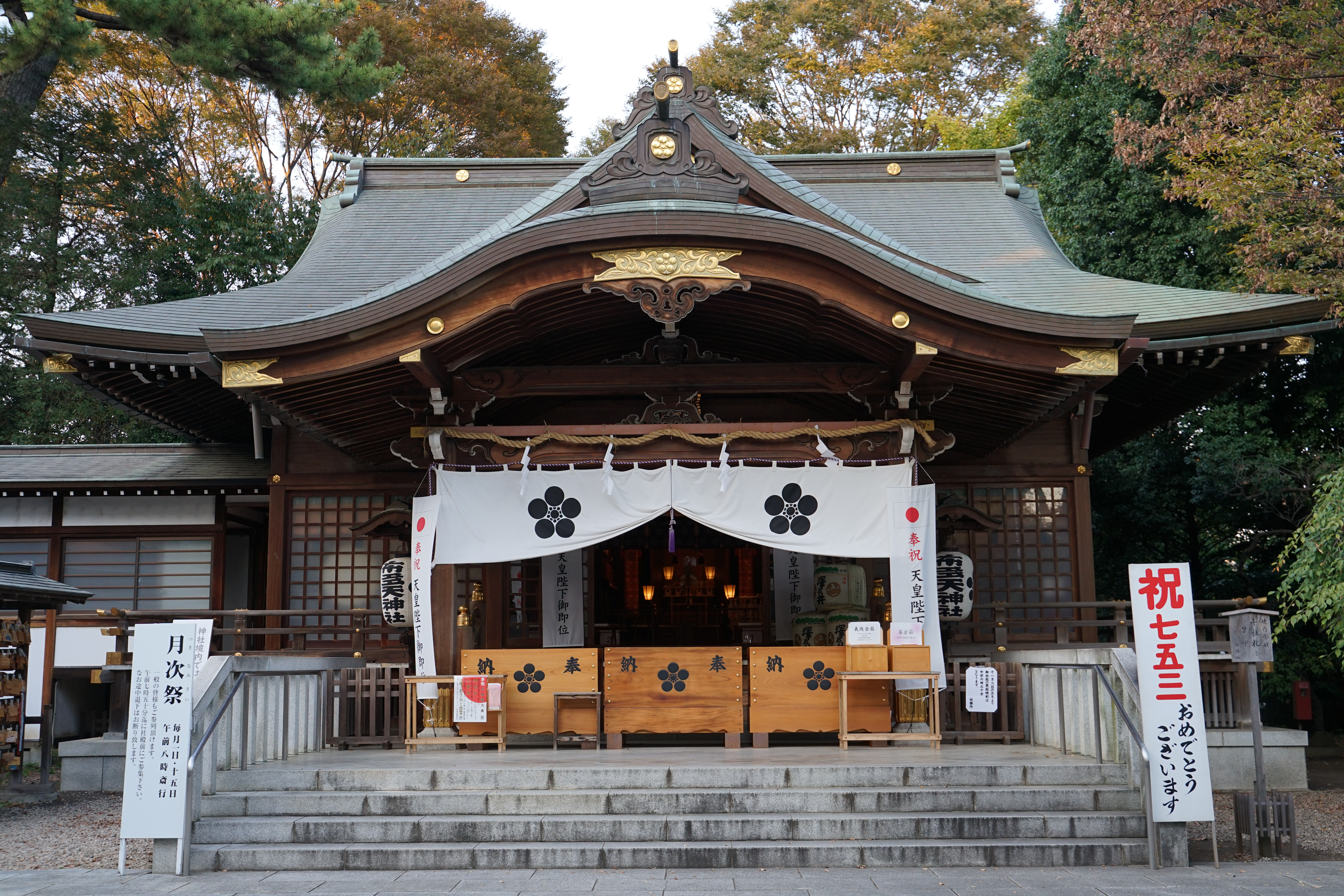
Fudaten Shrine

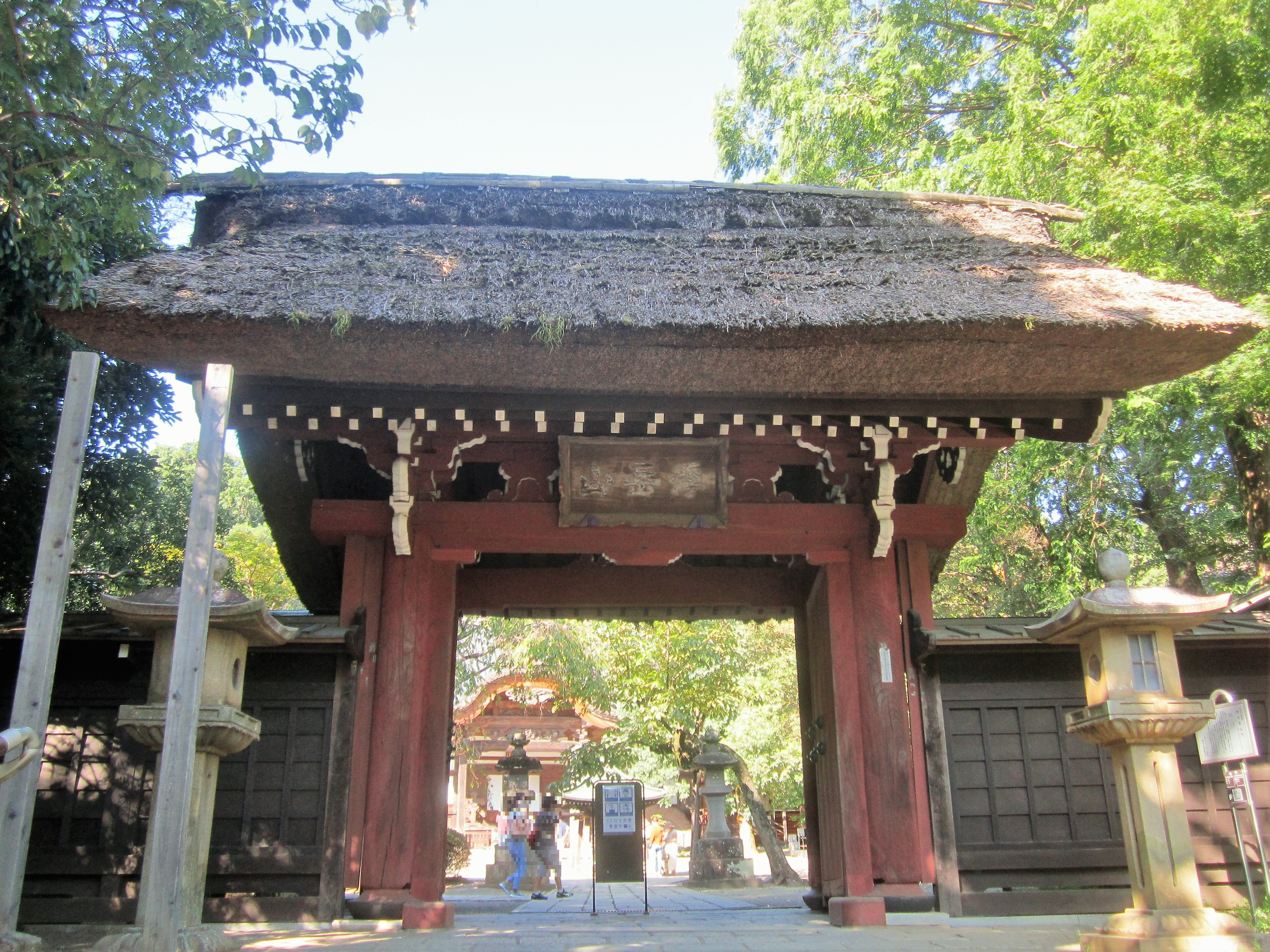
A main gate in Jindai Temple

There is a park and memorial hall commemorating the life of novelist Mushanokōji Saneatsu, a former resident of Chōfu.

For the 1964 Summer Olympics, the city served as part of the route for the athletic 50-kilometer walk and marathon events.

== Notable people from Chōfu ==
- Kondō Isami, Bakumatsu period samurai, born in the village of Kami-Ishihara in Musashi Province, now modern Chōfu
- Shigeru Mizuki, cartoonist, born in Osaka and raised in Sakaiminato, Tottori but lived in Chofu for roughly 50 years
- Saneatsu Mushanokōji, novelist, playwright, poet
- Shutaro Oku, director
- Yuki Soma, professional football player
- Junji Takada, actor
- Miho Yamada, former rhythmic gymnast

== See also ==
- Gamera and GeGeGe no Kitarō - characters from these franchises serve as mascots of the city.
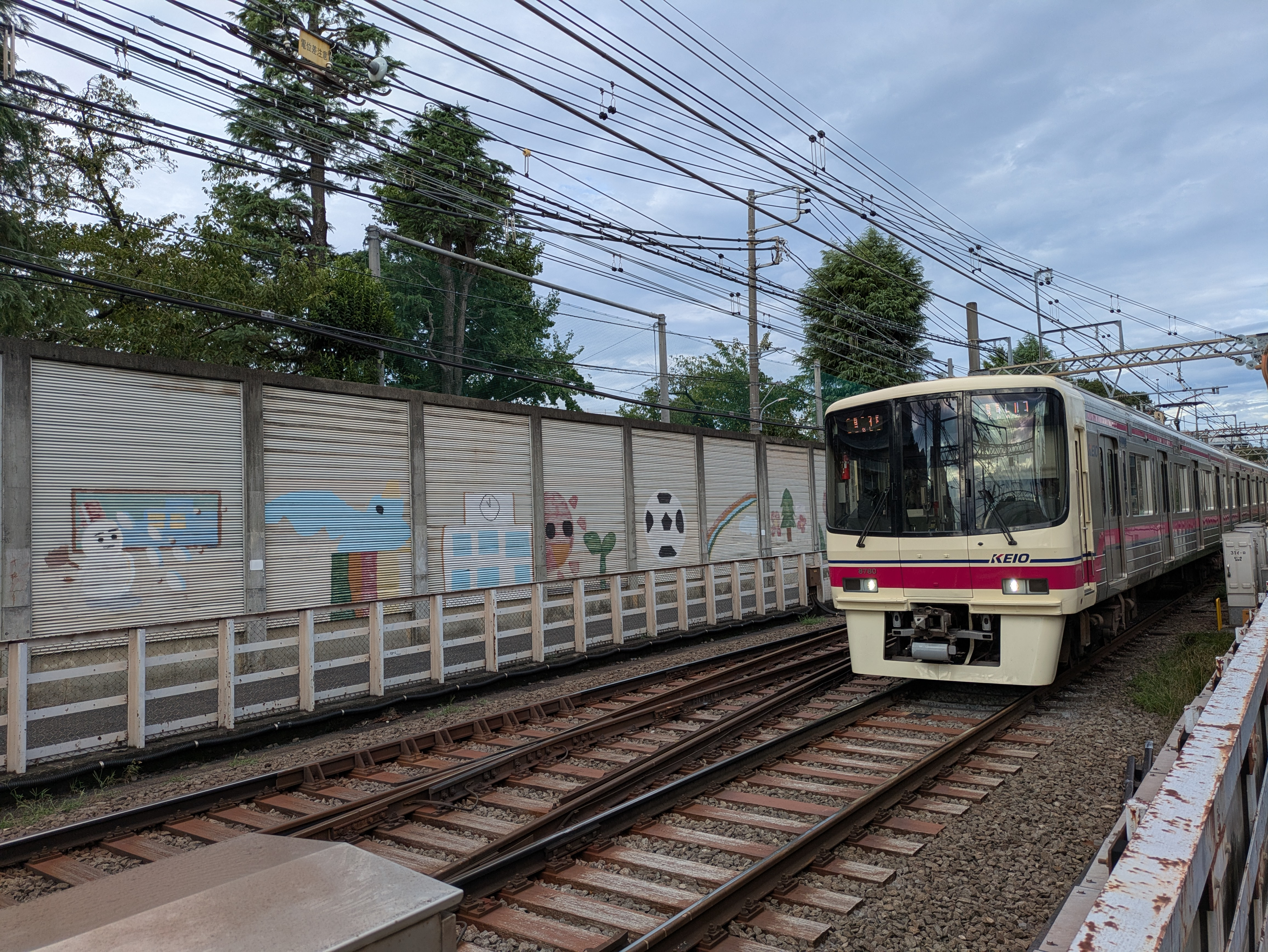
Takisaka Elementary School mural and Keio Line（202509）

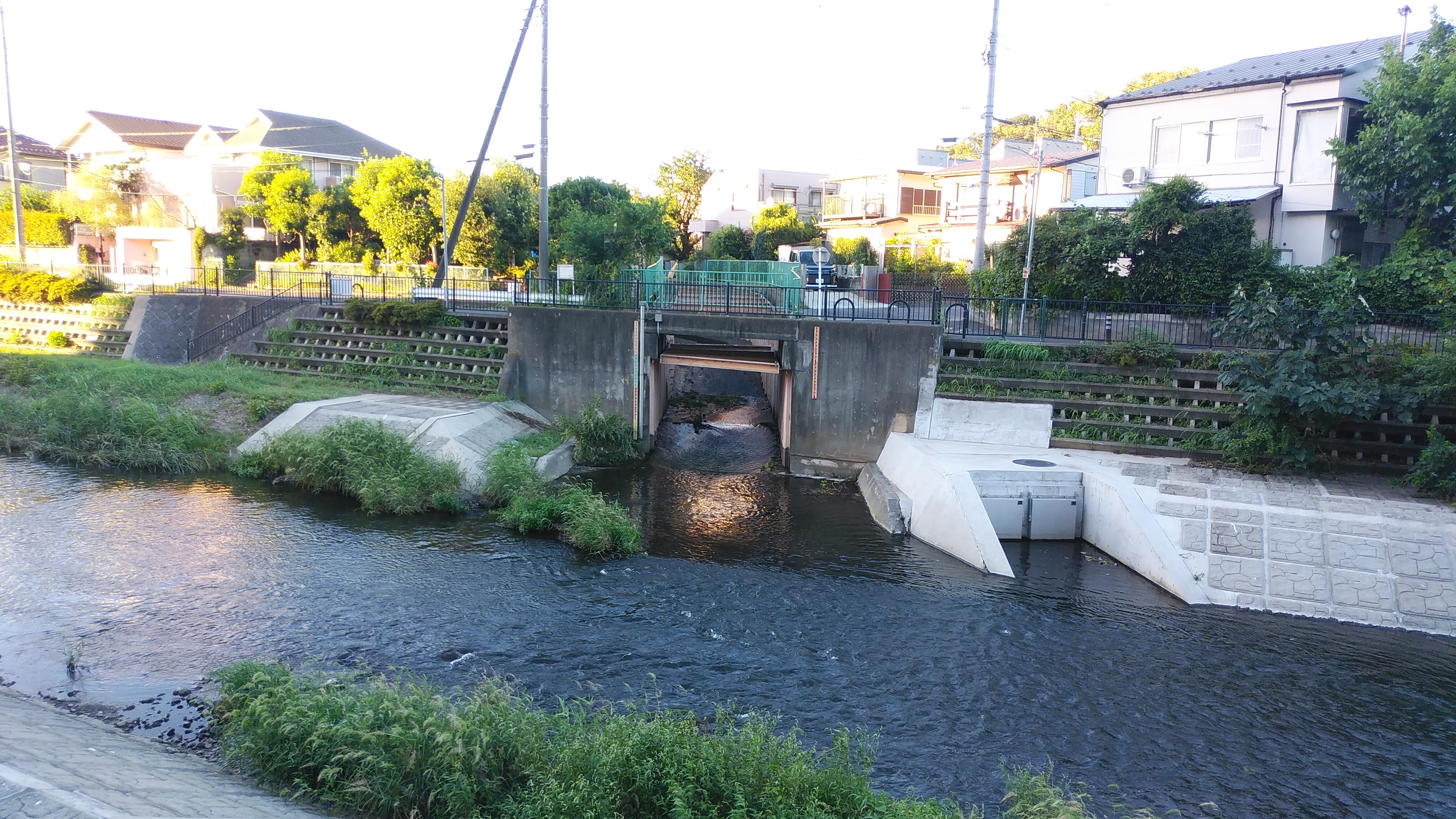
Nogawa River and Irumagawa River confluence（202409）

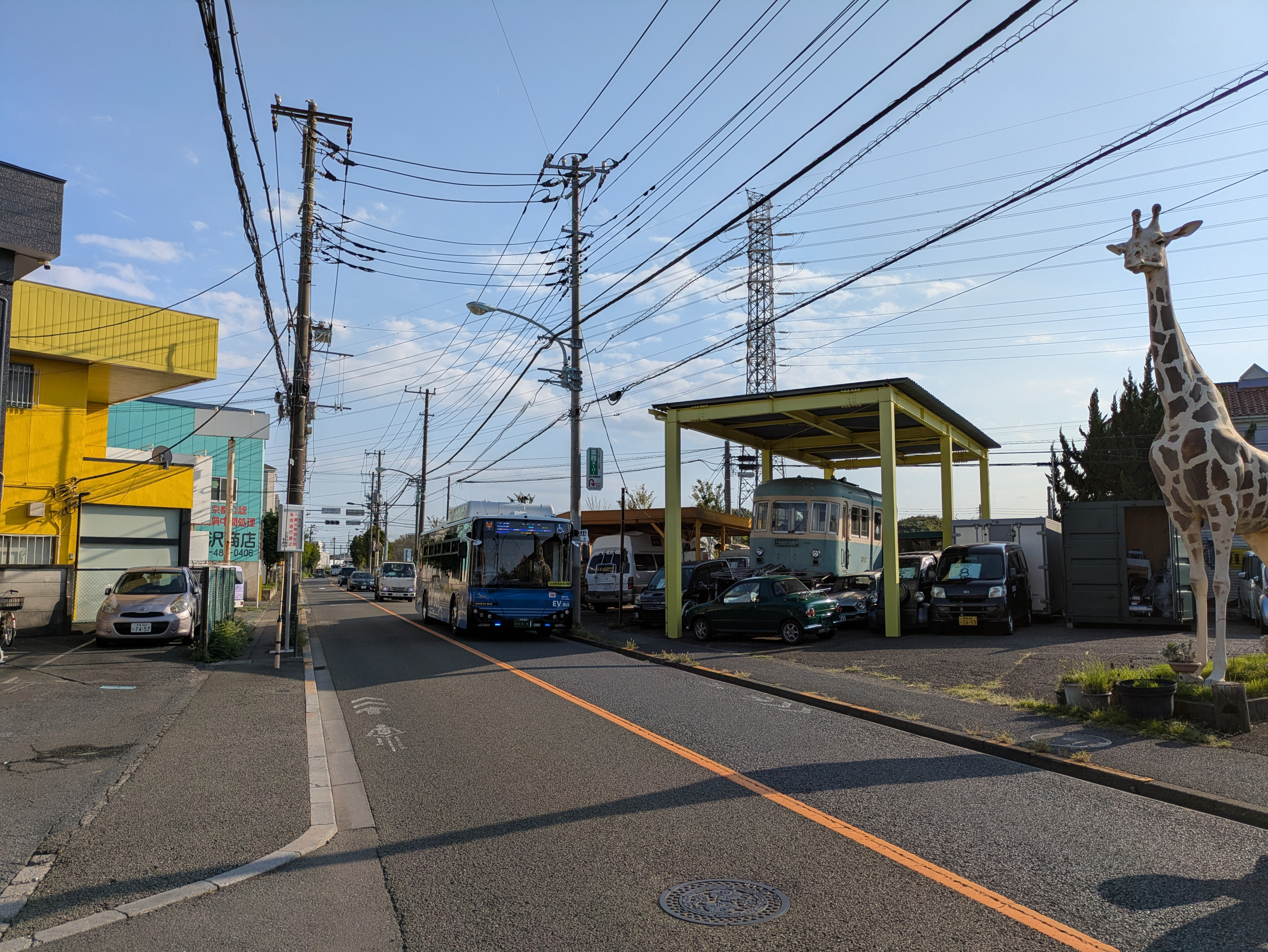
Residential area in the Jindaiji area
(202509)

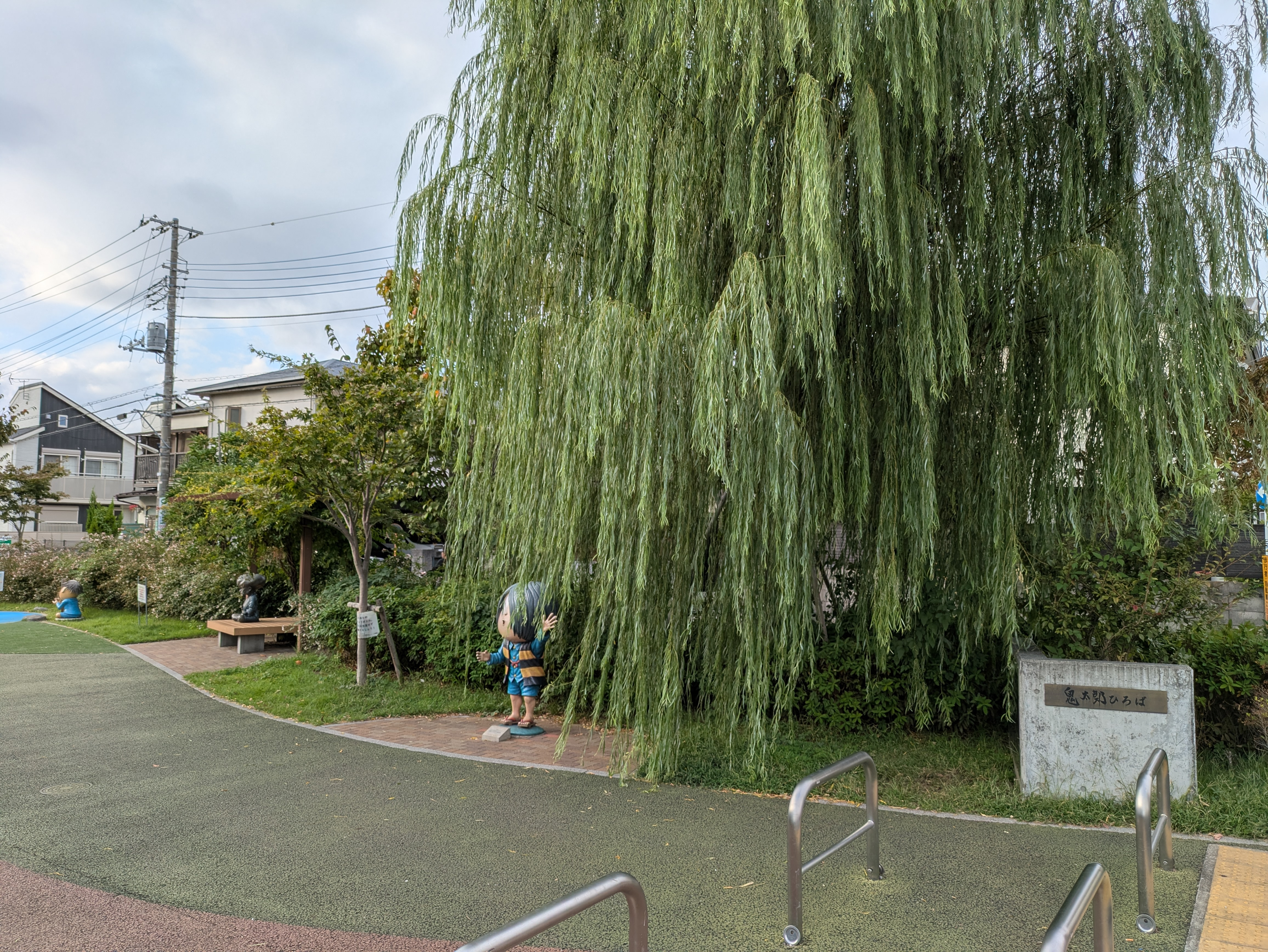
Kitaro Square, managed by Chofu City
（202510）
