= Keiō-inadazutsumi Station =

Railway station in Kawasaki, Kanagawa Prefecture, Japan

Keio-inadazutsumi Station 京王稲田堤駅

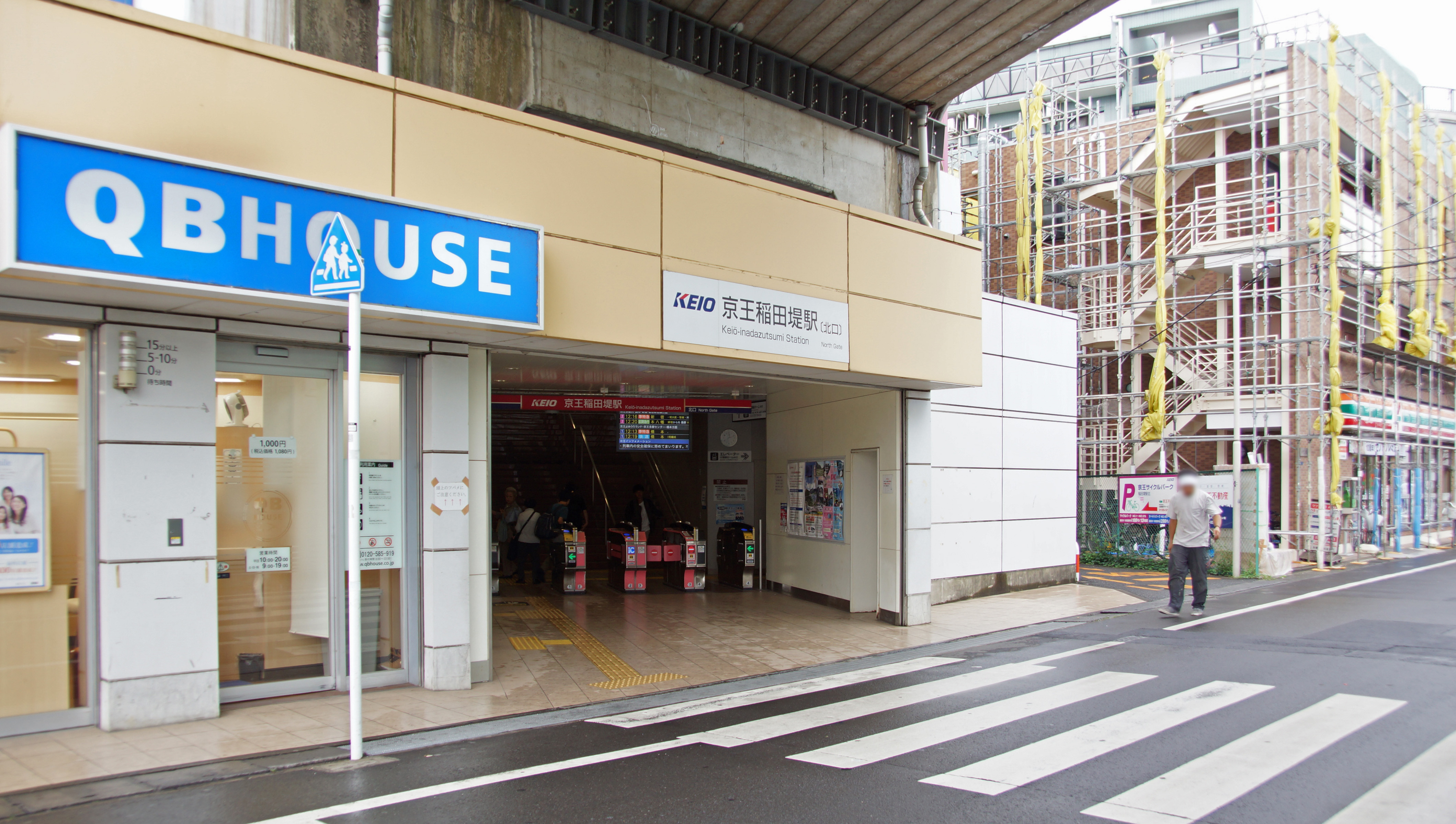
- The north entrance to Keiō-inadazutsumi Station in June 2017

General information
- Location: 4-1-1 Suge, Tama-ku, Kawasaki-shi, Kanagawa-ken 214-0001; Japan
- Coordinates: 35°38′02″N 139°31′52″E
- Operator: Keio Corporation
- Line: Keio Sagamihara Line
- Distance: 2.5 km from Chōfu
- Platforms: 2 side platforms
- Tracks: 2
- Connections: Bus stop

Construction
- Structure type: Elevated

Other information
- Station code: KO36
- Website: Official website

History
- Opened: 1 April 1971

Passengers
- FY2019: 57,300

Services
Preceding station	Keio Corporation	Following station
Keiō-nagayama towards Hashimoto	Sagamihara Line Special Express Express	Chōfu Terminus
Keiō-yomiuri-land towards Hashimoto	Sagamihara Line Semi Express Rapid Local	Keiō-tamagawa towards Chōfu
Location
- Location within Kanagawa Prefecture Location within Japan

Keio-inadazutsumi Station (京王稲田堤駅, Keiō-Inadazutsumi-eki) is a passenger railway station located in the Suge neighborhood of Tama-ku, Kawasaki, Kanagawa, Japan and operated by the private railway operator Keio Corporation. With Hashimoto Station and Wakabadai Station, it is one of only three Keio Line stations located in Kanagawa Prefecture.

== Lines ==
Keio-inadazutsumi Station is served by the Keio Sagamihara Line, and lies 2.5 km (1.6 mi) from the starting point of the line at Chōfu Station.

== Station layout ==
The station has two elevated side platforms serving two tracks.

=== Platforms ===
1	Keiō Sagamihara Line	for Tama-Center and Hashimoto
2	Keiō Sagamihara Line	for Chōfu, Meidaimae, and Shinjuku; Toei Shinjuku Line for Moto-Yawata

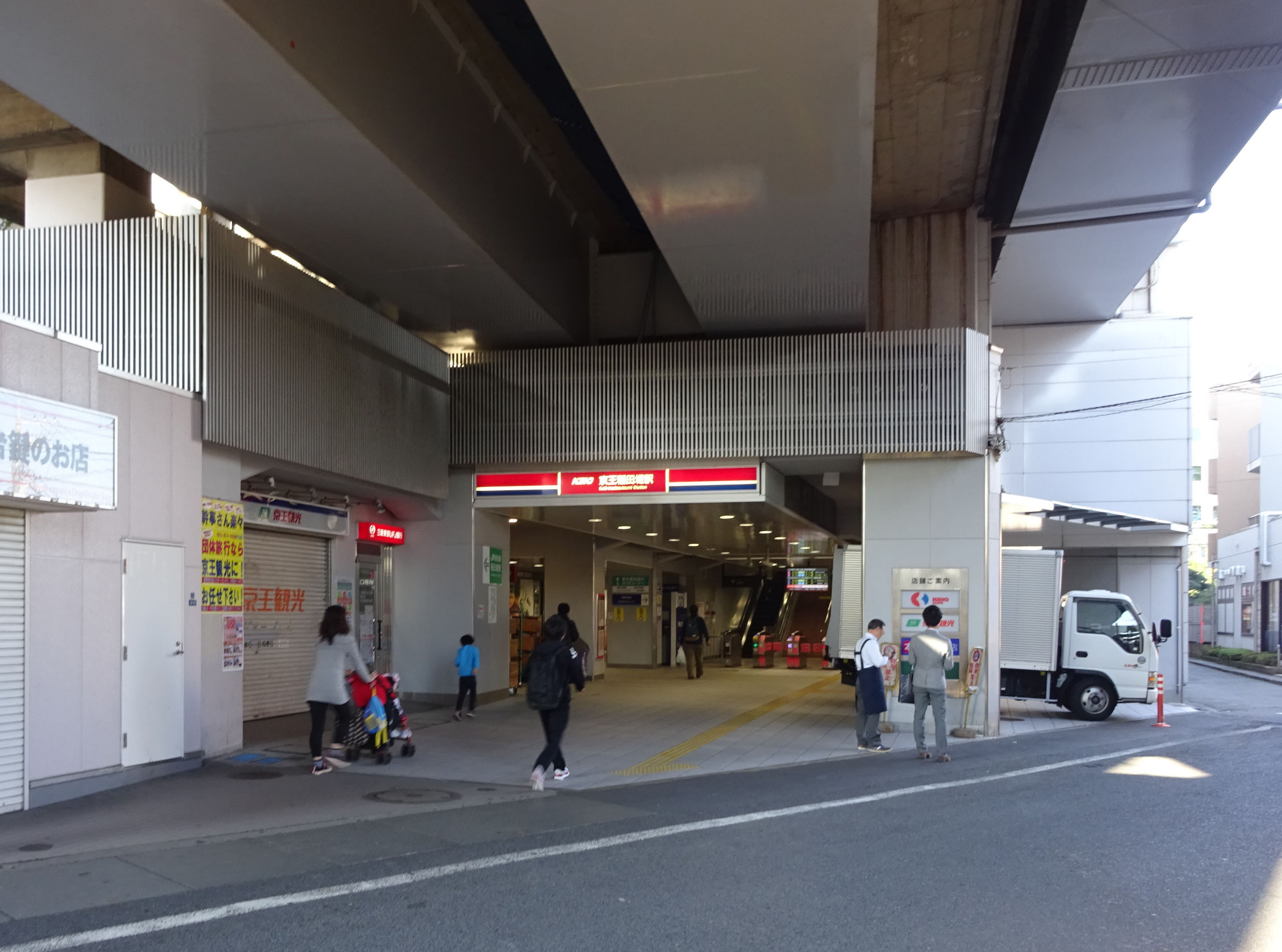
The south entrance in October 2016

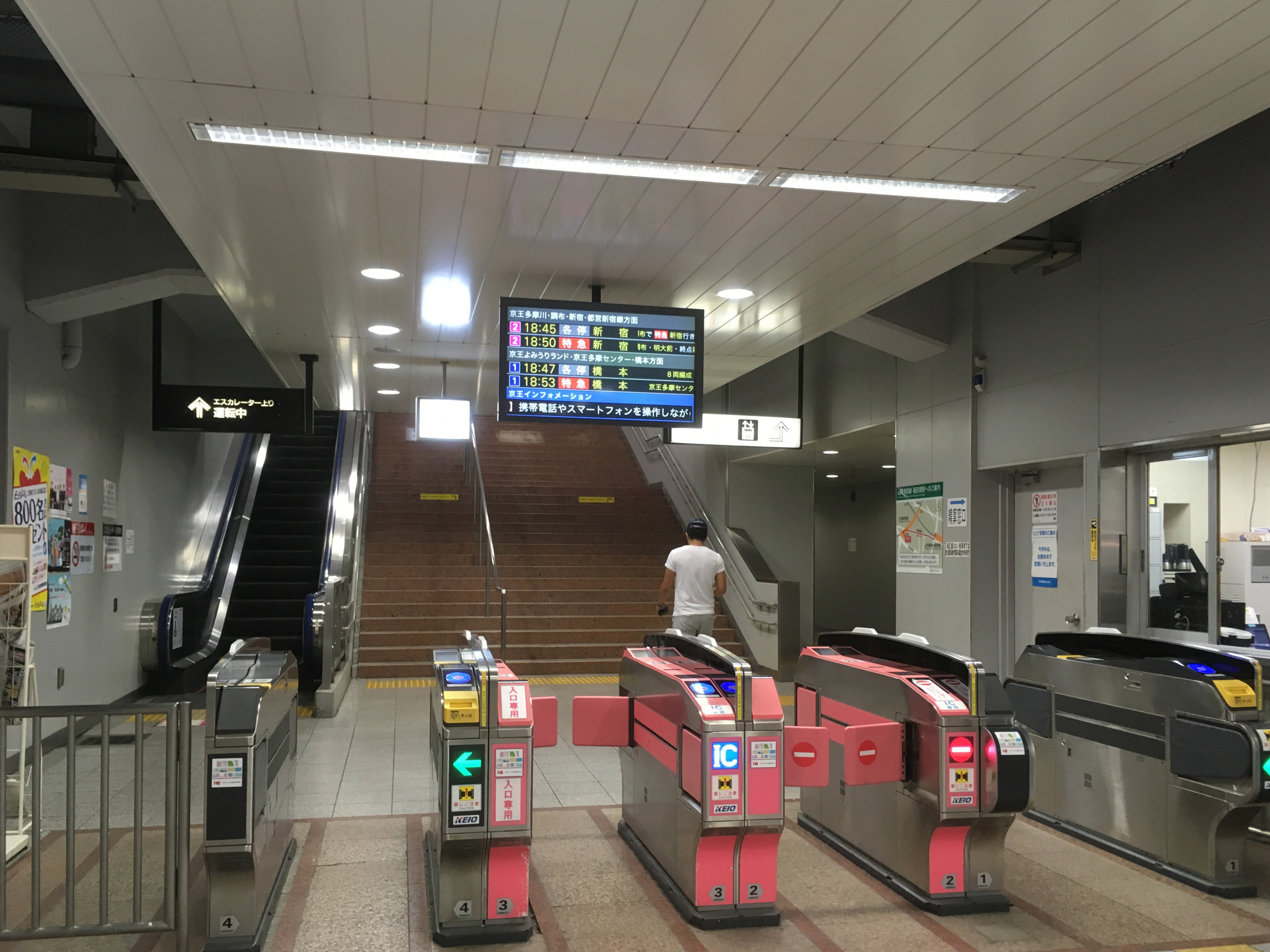
The ticket barriers at the south entrance in June 2017

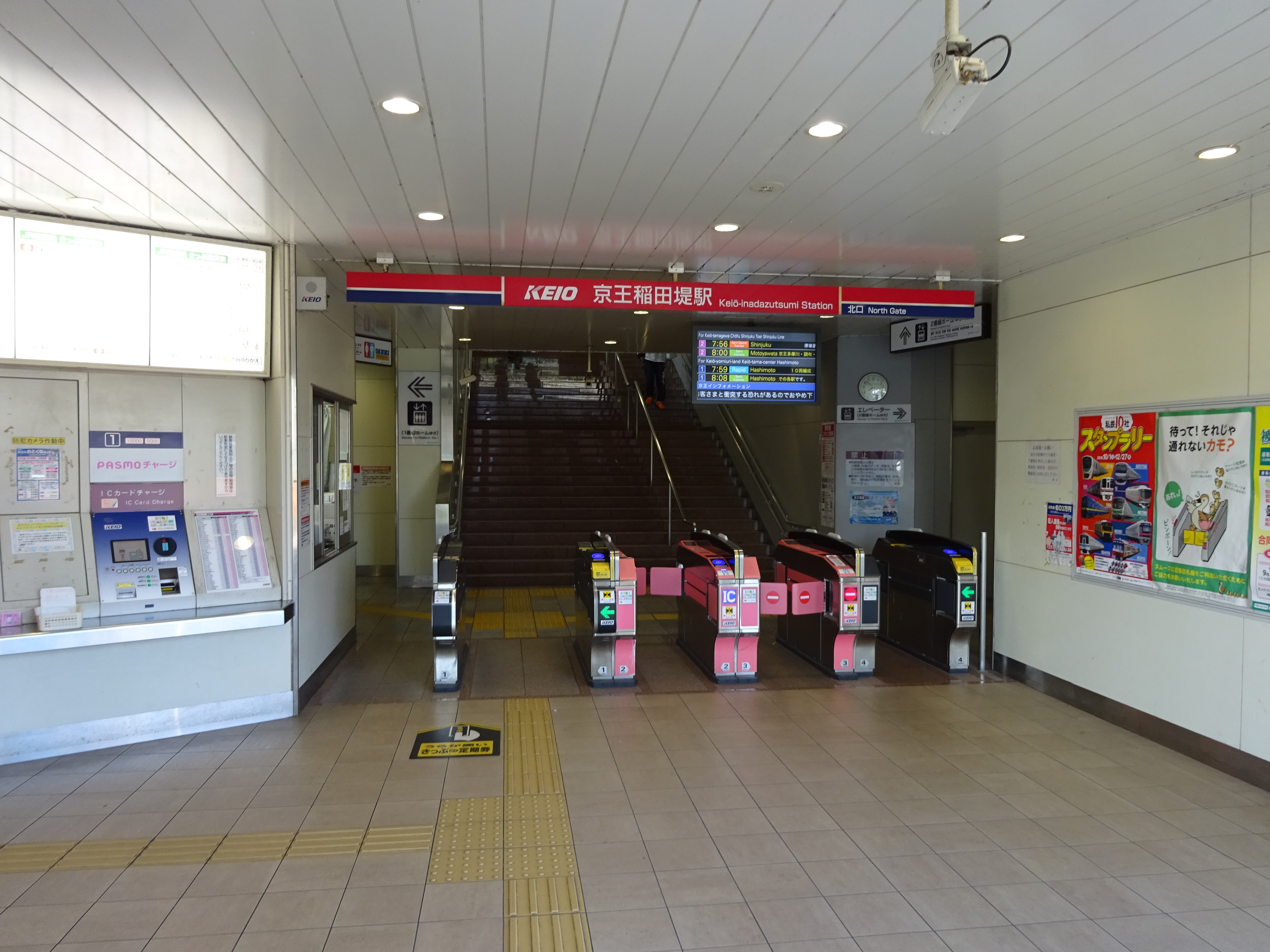
The ticket barriers at the north entrance in October 2016

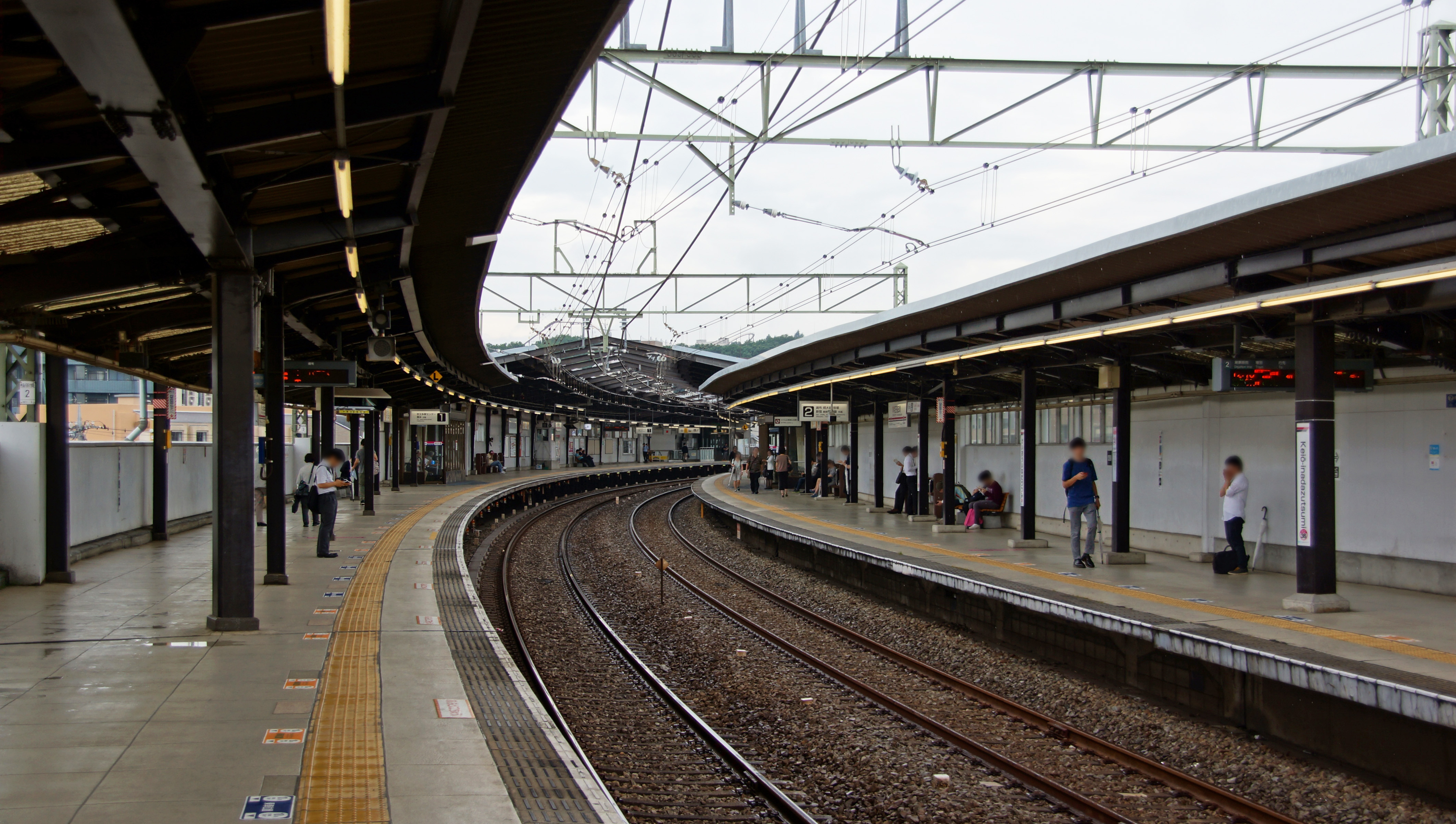
The platforms in June 2017, looking west

== History ==
Keio-Inadazutsumi Station opened on April 1, 1971.

== Passenger statistics ==
In fiscal 2019, the station was used by an average of 57,300 passengers daily.

The passenger figures for previous years are as shown below.

Fiscal year	daily average
2005	42,591
2010	47,898
2015	52,801

== Surrounding area ==
- Inadazutsumi Station on the JR Nambu Line

== See also ==
- List of railway stations in Japan
