= Keiō-tamagawa Station =

Railway station in Chōfu, Tokyo, Japan

Keio-tamagawa Station 京王多摩川駅

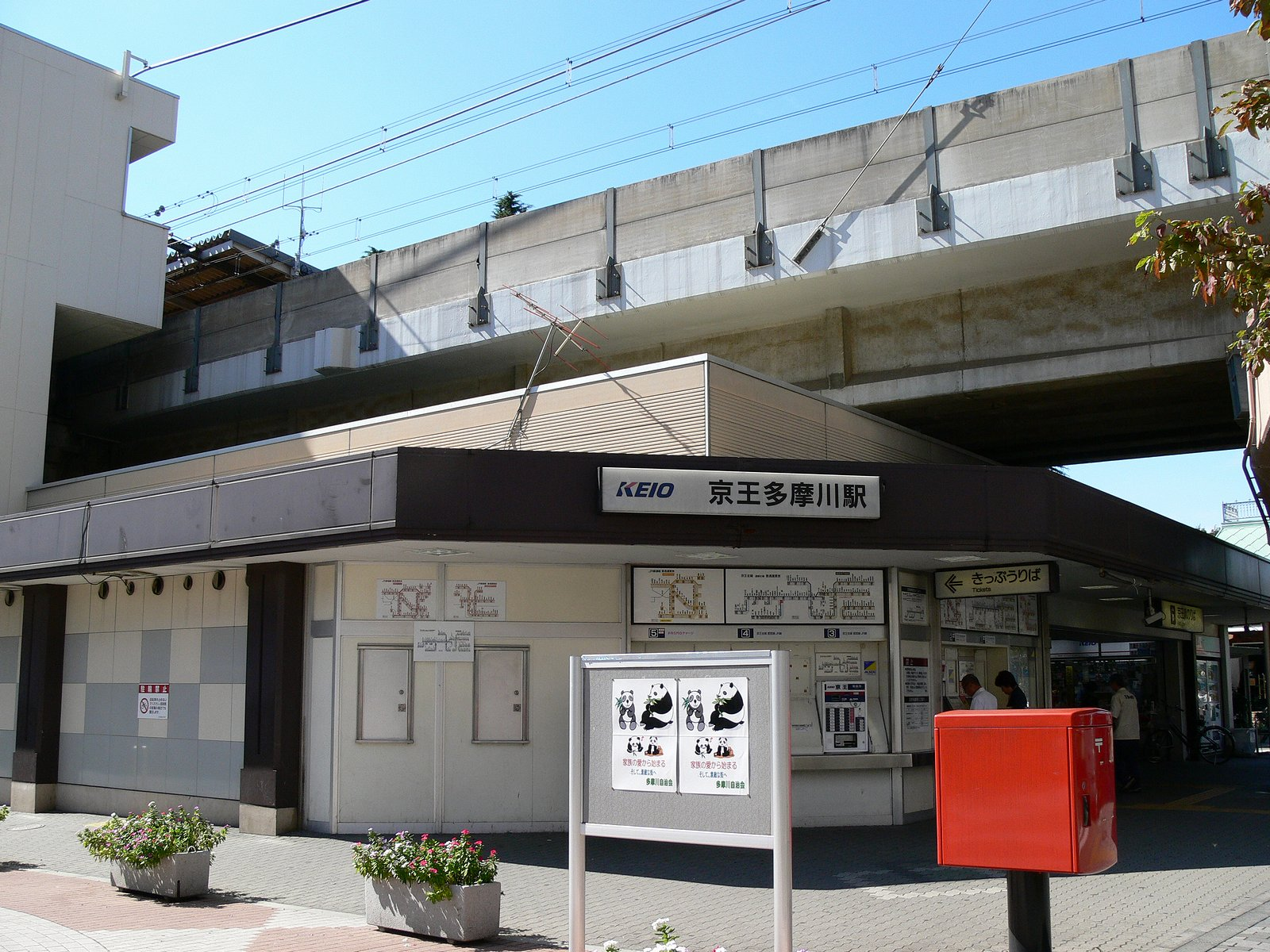
- Keio-tamagawa Station, October 2007

General information
- Location: 4-40-1 Tamagawa, Chōfu-shi, Tokyo; Japan
- Coordinates: 35°38′41″N 139°32′13″E
- Operator: Keio Corporation
- Line: Keio Sagamihara Line
- Distance: 16.7 km from Shinjuku
- Platforms: 2 side platforms
- Connections: Bus stop

Other information
- Station code: KO35
- Website: Official website

History
- Opened: 1 June 1916
- Former names: Tamagawara (until 1937)

Passengers
- FY2019: 17,021

Services
Preceding station	Keio Corporation	Following station
Keiō-inadazutsumi towards Hashimoto	Sagamihara Line Semi Express Rapid Local	Chōfu Terminus
Location
- Location within Tokyo Location within Japan

Keio-tamagawa Station (京王多摩川駅, Keiō-Tamagawa-eki) is a passenger railway station located in the city of Chōfu, Tokyo, Japan, operated by the private railway operator Keio Corporation

== Lines ==
Keio-tamagawa Station is served by the Keio Sagamihara Line, and is 1.2 kilometers from the starting point of the line at Chōfu and 16.7 kilometers from Shinjuku Station in downtown Tokyo.

== Station Layout ==
This station consists of two opposed elevated side platforms serving two tracks, with the station building located underneath.

=== Platforms ===
1	■ Keio Sagamihara Line	for Hashimoto
2	■ Keio Sagamihara Line	for Chōfu

== History ==
The station opened on June 1, 1916 as Tamagawara Station (多摩川原駅). It was renamed Keio-tamagawa Station on May 1, 1937.

== Passenger statistics ==
In fiscal 2019, the station was used by an average of 17,021 passengers daily.

The passenger figures (boarding passengers only) for previous years are as shown below.

Fiscal year	daily average
2005	16,160
2010	16,108
2015	17,404

== Surrounding area ==
- Keiokaku Velodrome

== See also ==
- List of railway stations in Japan
