= Sengawa Theater =

Municipal theatre in Tokyo, Japan

Coordinates: 35°39′41″N 139°35′13″E

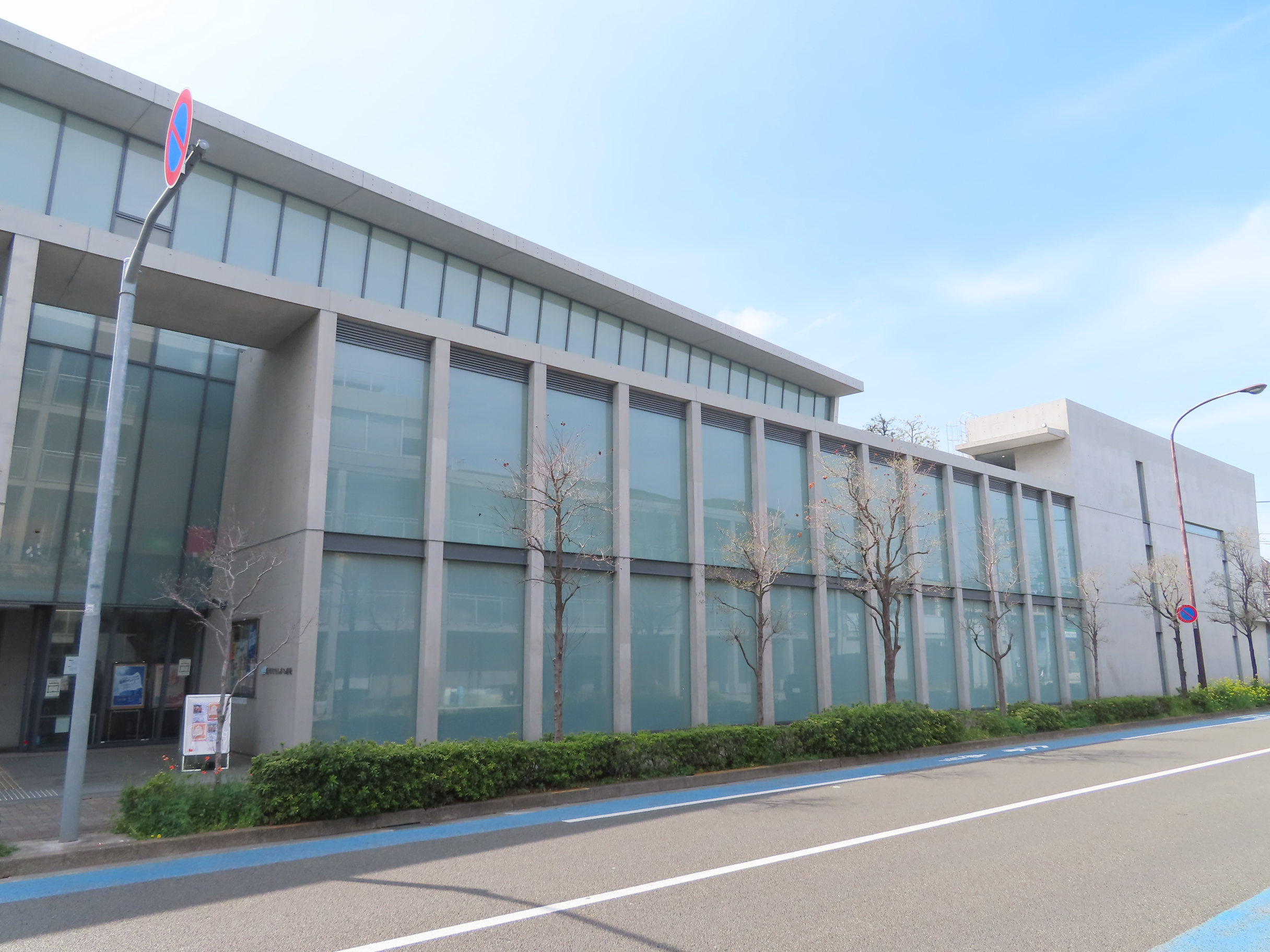
Sengawa Theater

Sengawa Theater is a municipal theater in Sengawa Town, Chofu, Tokyo.

The culture and performing arts quarter known as the "ACT+ (Act Plus) district", located in the city's urban development area, along with Art Museum and City House Sengawa, totaling 432 meters in length, are part of the large-scale urban development project planned by architect Tadao Ando, opened in March 2008. As for the management of the theater, the artistic director is employed to manage, with fifty percent of his time out of the year, sponsoring the theater's own productions. As a civil service and one not limited to theatrical performances, events are planned in cooperation with nearby shopping districts, educational institutions, and civic groups. Sengawa Theater Ensemble is associated with the Stage Team, which is made up of professional actors and staff, as well as public staff.

== Artistic director ==
- Peter Goesnner (2008 Jan –)

== Access ==
- 2 minute walk from Sengawa Station on the Keio Line

Address: Chofu, Tokyo 〒 182-8511 Sengawacho 1-21-5

== See also ==
- Tadao Ando
