= Keio Sagamihara Line =

Railway line in Japan

Sagamihara Line

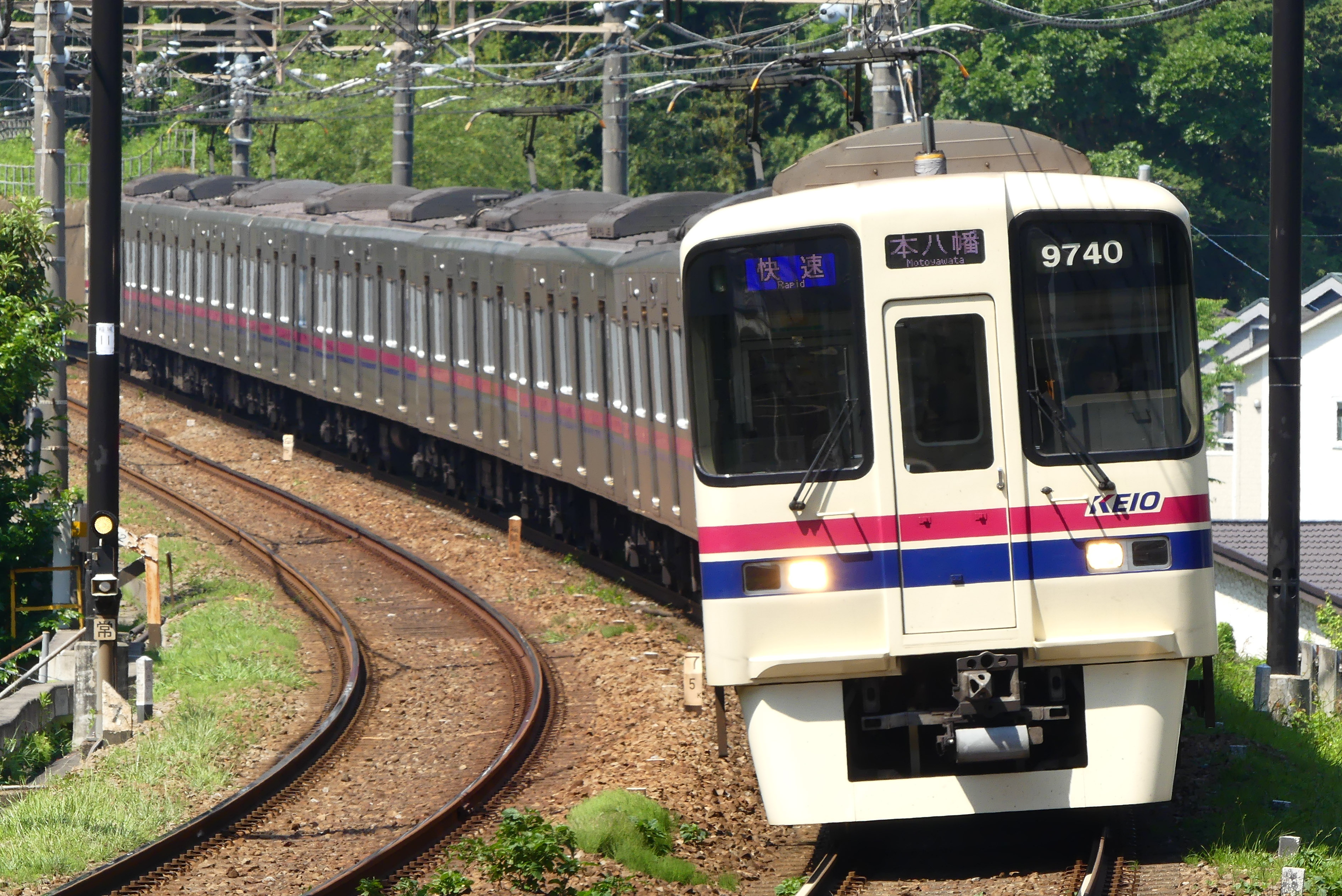
- A 9000 series EMU at Inagi Station in May 2017

Overview
- Native name: 相模原線
- Status: In service
- Owner: Keio Corporation
- Line number: KO
- Locale: Tokyo, Kanagawa prefectures
- Termini: Chōfu; Hashimoto
- Stations: 12

Service
- Type: Commuter rail
- System: Keio Electric Railway
- Operator(s): Keio Corporation
- Rolling stock: Keio 5000 series Keio 9000 series Keio 8000 series Keio 7000 series Toei 10-300 series Keio 2000 series

History
- Opened: 1 June 1916; 109 years ago
- Last extension: 30 March 1990; 36 years ago

Technical
- Line length: 22.6 km (14.0 mi)
- Number of tracks: 2
- Track gauge: 1,372 mm (4 ft 6 in)
- Minimum radius: 160 m (520 ft)
- Electrification: Overhead line, 1,500 V DC
- Operating speed: 110 km/h (70 mph)
- Train protection system: Keio ATC
- Maximum incline: 3.5%

The Sagamihara Line (相模原線, Sagamihara-sen) is a Japanese railway line operated by the private railway operator Keio Corporation, connecting Hashimoto Station in Sagamihara, Kanagawa Prefecture and Chōfu Station in Chōfu, Tokyo.

== Station list ==
Rapid and Semi express services stop at all stations on this line.

No.	Station	Distance (km)			Express	Special Express	Keio Liner	Transfers	Location	
No.	Station	Between stations	Total		Express	Special Express	Keio Liner	Transfers	Location	
No.	Station	Between stations	From Chōfu	From Shinjuku	Express	Special Express	Keio Liner	Transfers	Location	
	Chōfu 調布	-	0.0	15.5	O	O	|	Keiō Line (KO18; through service)	Chōfu	Tokyo
	Keiō-tamagawa 京王多摩川	1.2	1.2	16.7	| (Note: Trains stop during special events only.)	|	|		Chōfu	Tokyo
	Keiō-inadazutsumi 京王稲田堤	1.3	2.5	18.0	O	O	|	Nambu Line (Inadazutsumi: JN16)	Tama-ku, Kawasaki	Kanagawa
	Keiō-yomiuri-land 京王よみうりランド	1.4	3.9	19.4	|	|	|		Inagi	Tokyo
	Inagi 稲城	1.6	5.5	21.0	|	|	|		Inagi	Tokyo
	Wakabadai 若葉台	3.3	8.8	24.3	|	|	|		Asao-ku, Kawasaki	Kanagawa
	Keiō-nagayama 京王永山	2.6	11.4	26.9	O	O	O	Tama Line (Odakyū-Nagayama: OT05)	Tama	Tokyo
	Keio-tama-center 京王多摩センター	2.3	13.7	29.2	O	O	O	Tama Line (Odakyū Tama-Center: OT06); Tama Toshi Monorail Line (Tama-Center: TT01)	Tama	Tokyo
	Keiō-horinouchi 京王堀之内	2.3	16.0	31.5	|	|	|		Hachiōji	Tokyo
	Minami-ōsawa 南大沢	2.2	18.2	33.7	O	O	O		Hachiōji	Tokyo
	Tamasakai 多摩境	1.9	20.1	35.6	|	|	|		Machida	Tokyo
	Hashimoto 橋本	2.5	22.6	38.1	O	O	O	Yokohama Line (JH28); ■ Sagami Line	Midori-ku, Sagamihara	Kanagawa

== History ==
A Keio Sagamihara Line train, 2025

The line opened as a one-stop single-track spur from Chōfu to Keiō-Tamagawa on 1 June 1916, electrified at 600 V DC, and was double-tracked on 1 April 1924. On 1 May 1937, Tamagawara was renamed Keiō-Tamagawa, and on 4 August 1963, the voltage was increased to 1,500 V DC.

The line was extended (all extensions were electrified dual track) on 1 April 1971, to Keiō-Yomiuri-Land. Subsequent extensions brought the line to Keiō-Tama-Center (18 October 1974), Minami-Ōsawa (22 May 1988) and Hashimoto (30 March 1990). Tamasakai station opened on 6 April 1991.

In 2012, the Chofu to Keiō-Tamagawa section was relocated underground.

Station numbering was introduced on 22 February 2013.

== See also ==
- List of railway lines in Japan
