= Chōfu Station (Tokyo) =

Railway station in Chōfu, Tokyo, Japan

Chōfu Station 調布駅

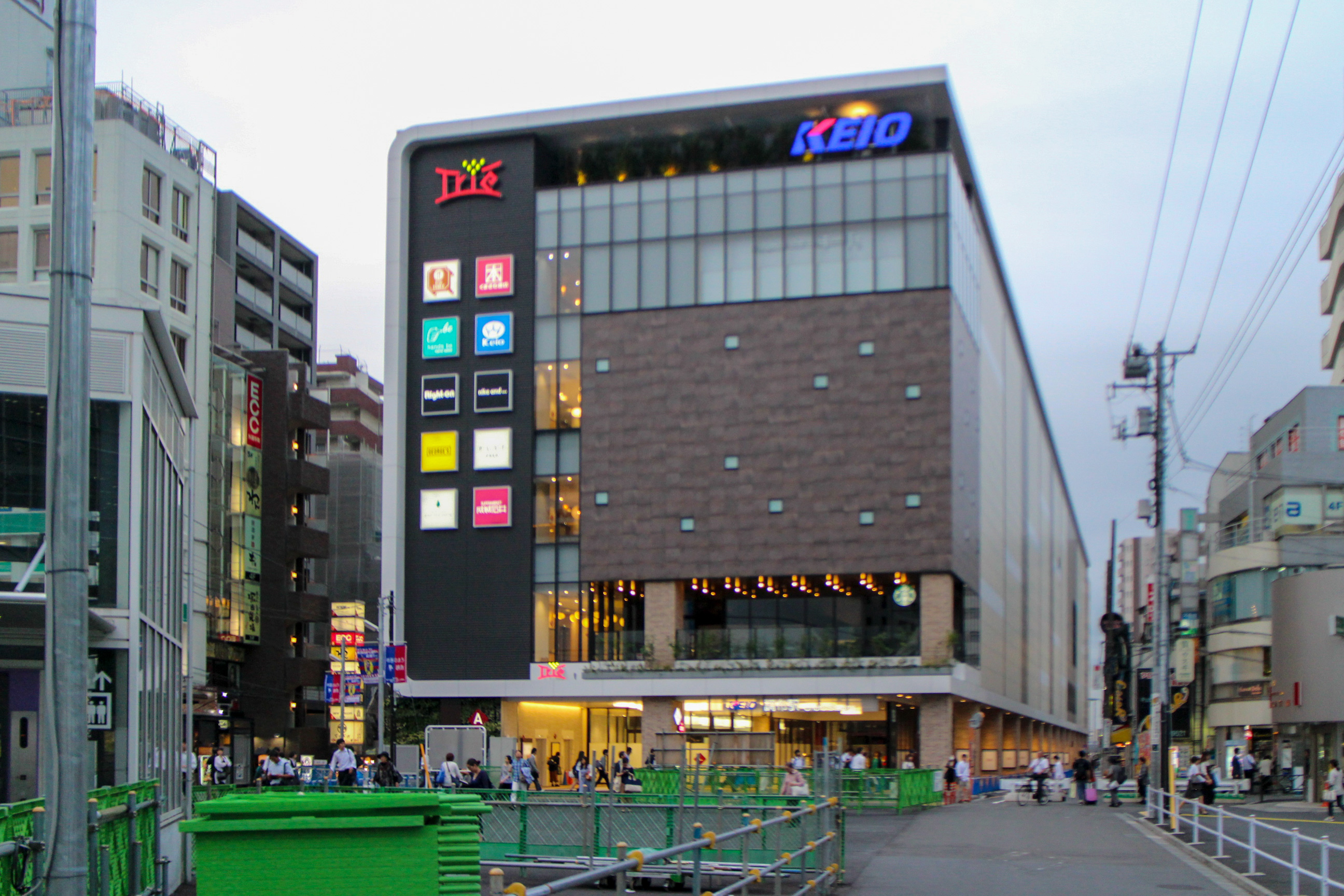
- Chōfu Station building, October 2017

General information
- Location: 4-32-1 Fuda, Chōfu-shi, Tokyo 182-0024; Japan
- Coordinates: 35.6521659°N 139.5440376°E
- Operator: Keio Corporation
- Lines: Keio Line; Keio Sagamihara Line
- Distance: 15.5 km (9.6 mi) from Shinjuku
- Platforms: 2 island platforms

Other information
- Station code: KO18
- Website: Official website

History
- Opened: April 15, 1913; 113 years ago

Passengers
- 2019: 130,065 (daily)

Services
Preceding station	Keio Corporation	Following station
Fuchū towards Keiō-hachiōji	Keiō Line Special Express	Chitose-karasuyama towards Shinjuku
Higashi-fuchū towards Keiō-hachiōji	Keiō Line Express Semi Express	Tsutsujigaoka towards Shinjuku
Nishi-chōfu towards Keiō-hachiōji	Keiō Line Rapid	Tsutsujigaoka towards Shinjuku
Nishi-chōfu towards Keiō-hachiōji	Keiō Line Local	Fuda towards Shinjuku
Keiō-inadazutsumi towards Hashimoto	Sagamihara Line Special Express Express	through to Keiō Line
Keiō-tamagawa towards Hashimoto	Sagamihara Line Semi Express Rapid Local	through to Keiō Line
Location
- Location within Tokyo Location within Japan

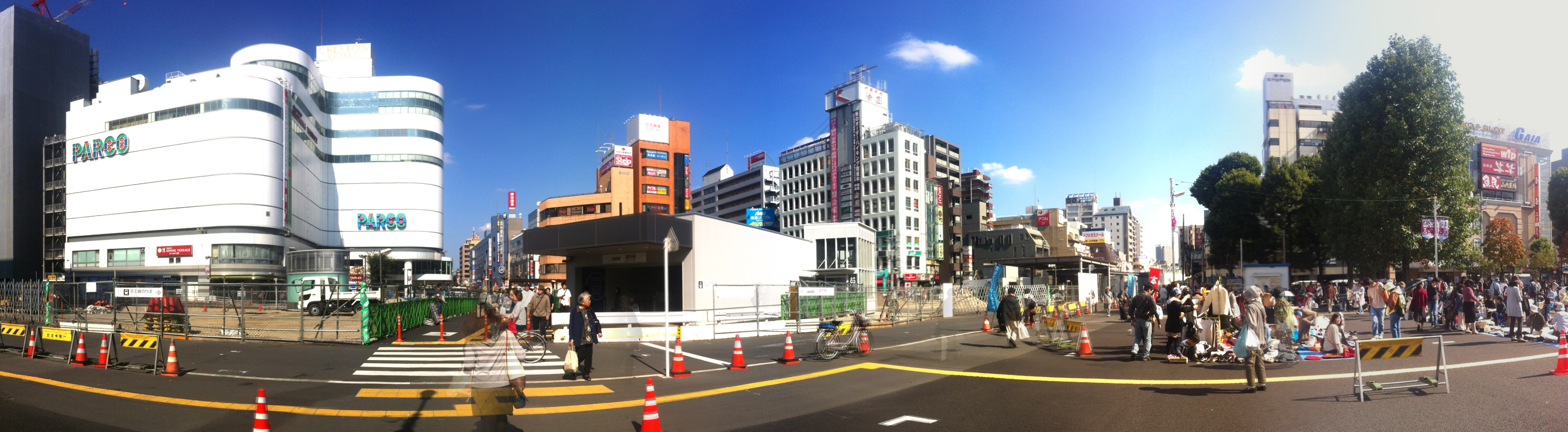
The new entrance to the underground tracks, 2014

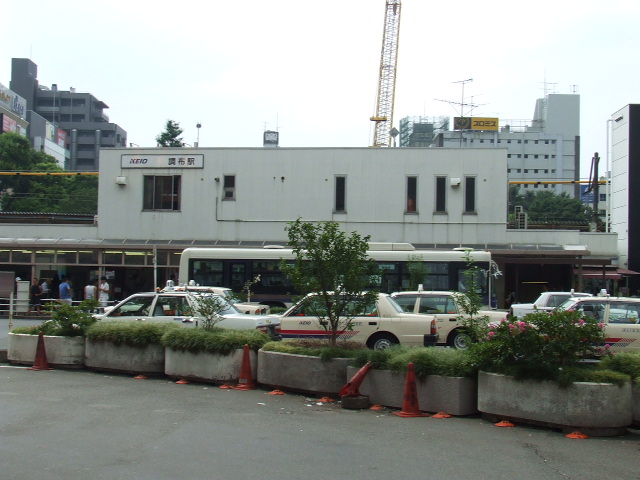
Chōfu Station in 2007 (north side, before the opening of the underground tracks)

Chōfu Station (調布駅, Chōfu-eki) is a junction passenger railway station located in the city of Chōfu, Tokyo, Japan, operated by the private railway operator Keio Corporation.

== Lines ==
Chōfu Station is served by the Keio Line and Keiō Sagamihara Line as the junction of the two lines. It is located 15.5 km (9.6 mi) from the starting point of the Keio Line at Shinjuku Station and is a terminus of the 22.6 km (14.0 mi) Sagamihara Line.

== Station layout ==
The station has two underground island platforms: one in the second basement (Platforms 1 and 2) and one in the third basement (Platforms 3 and 4). Ticket windows and gates are in the first basement.

=== Platforms ===
1, 2	Keiō Sagamihara Line	for Hashimoto
1, 2	Keiō Line	for Keiō-Hachiōji; Keiō Dōbutsuen Line for Tama-Dōbutsukōen (via Takahatafudō); Keiō Takao Line for Takaosanguchi (via Kitano)
3, 4	Keiō Line	for Meidaimae, Sasazuka, and Shinjuku (including trains from the Sagamihara Line for Shinjuku); Toei Shinjuku Line for Moto-Yawata

== History ==
The station opened on April 15, 1913 when Keiō Electric Railway opened its first section between Sasazuka and Chōfu as an Interurban.

=== Recent development ===
Until 2012, Chofu Station was on the ground level and had busy grade crossings at either end for road traffic, while trains arriving from the Keio Sagamihara Line blocked both lines of the Keio Line as they entered the station. Keio Corporation resolved both these issues by grade separating the railway lines around the station area. Underground tracks opened on August 19, 2012.

== Passenger statistics ==
In fiscal 2019, the station was used by an average of 130,065 passengers daily.

The passenger figures (boarding passengers only) for previous years are as shown below.

Fiscal year	daily average
2005	109,956
2010	114,906
2015	117,781

== Surrounding area ==
- Chōfu City Hall
- Chōfu Tenjin Shrine
- University of Electro-Communications

== See also ==
- List of railway stations in Japan
