= Naganuma Park =

Park in Tokyo, Japan

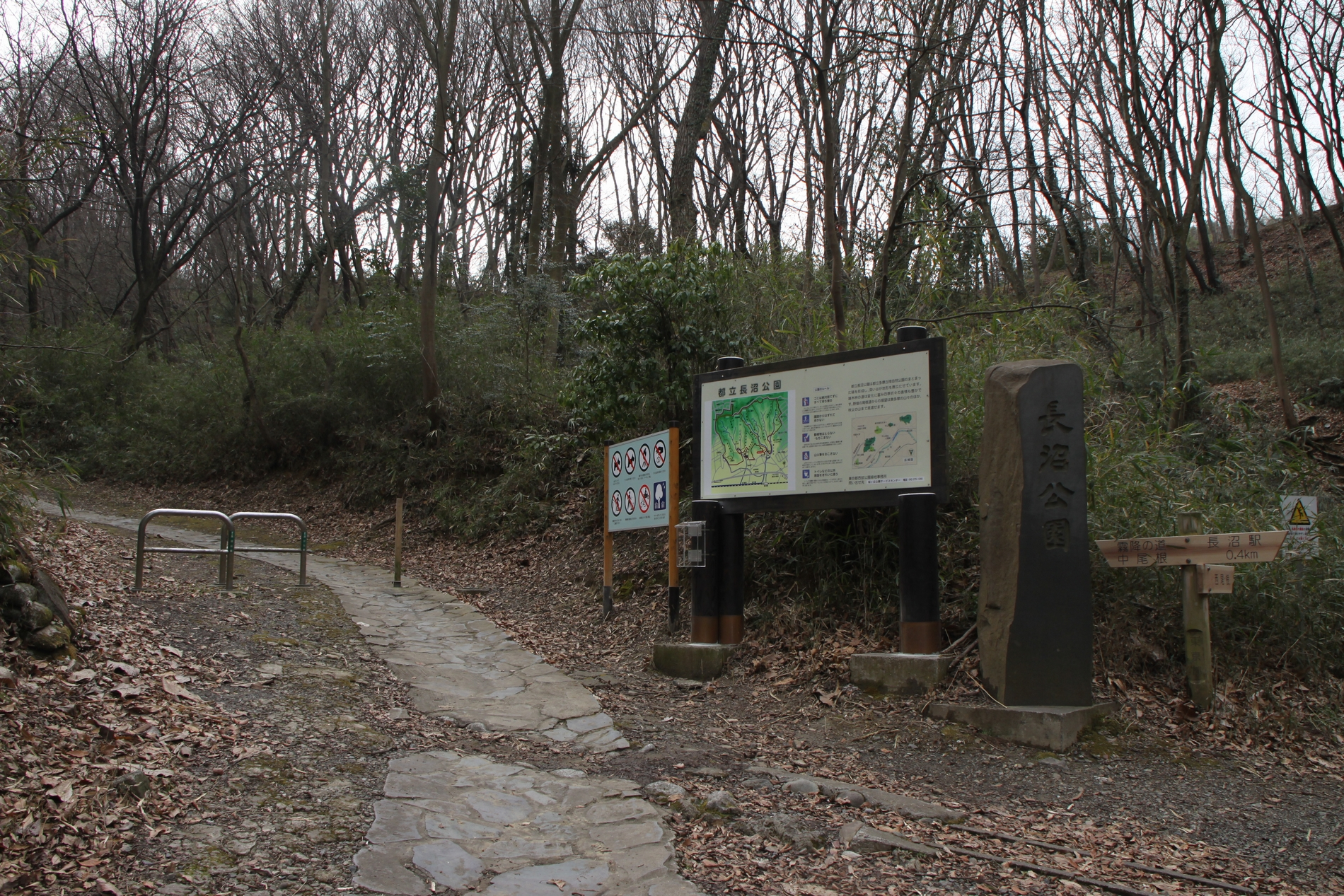
- Entrance to the park
- Interactive map of Naganuma Park
- Location: Hachiōji, Tokyo, Japan
- Coordinates: 35.638296°N 139.368526°E
- Area: 313,486 square metres (77.464 acres)
- Created: 1 June 1980
- Public transit: Naganuma Station

Naganuma Park (長沼公園, Naganuma Kōen) is a public park in the Naganuma-cho region of the city of Hachiōji in Tokyo, Japan.

== Overview ==
The park is located in the Tama Hills, and the Nozaru Pass Hiking Course runs through its southern tip. The park has a wooded area with broad-leaved trees such as sawtooth oak and jolcham oak. Birds found in the park include the Japanese tit, grey wagtail and Daurian redstart.

The park has different elevations with a height difference of 100 meters, and there are steep slopes in it.

== Access ==
- By train: 5 minutes’ walk from Naganuma Station on the Keiō Line.

== See also ==
- Parks and gardens in Tokyo
- National Parks of Japan
