= Minamidaira Station =

Railway station in Hino, Tokyo, Japan

Minamidaira Station 南平駅

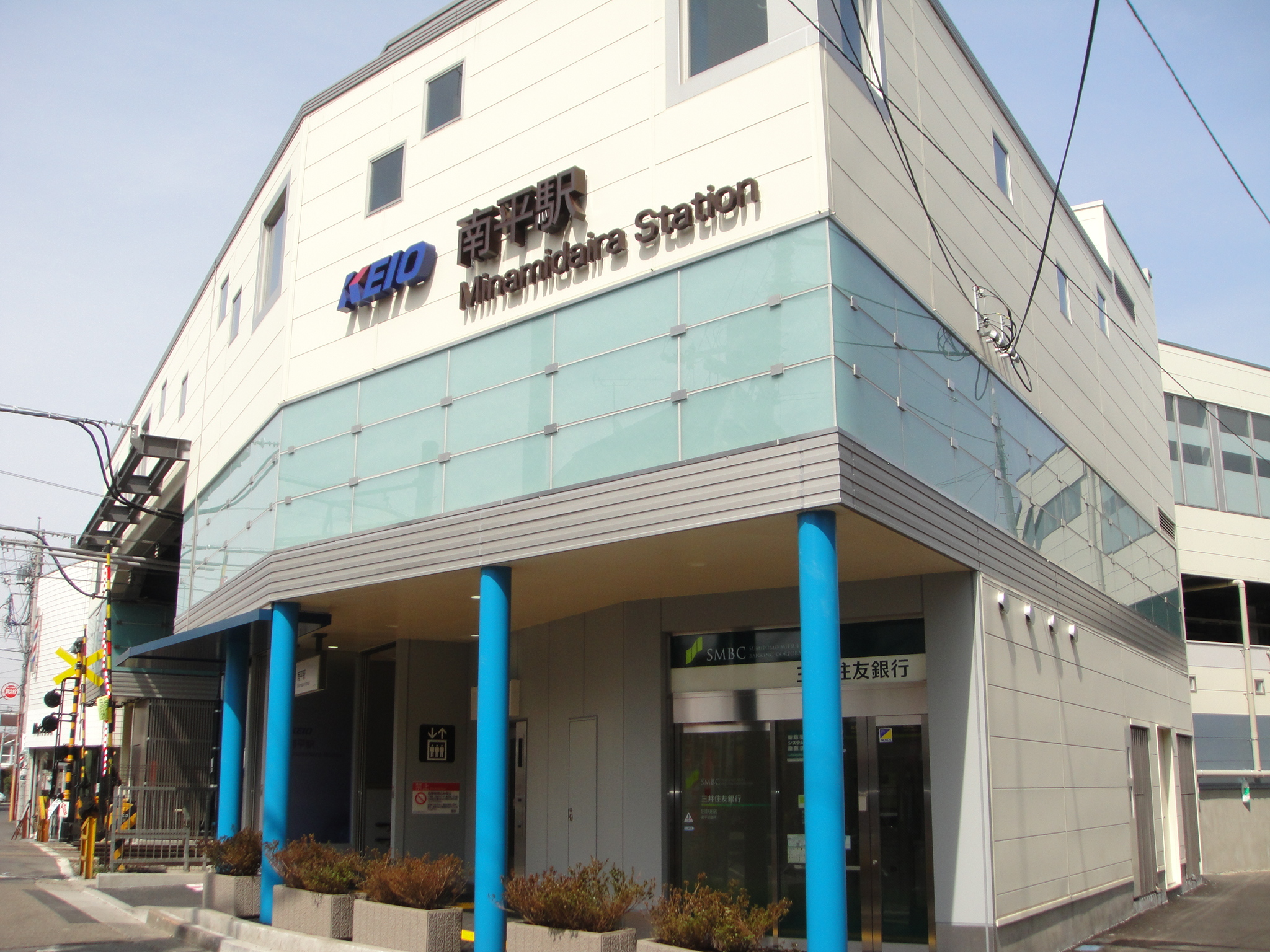
- Minamidaira Station, March 2012

General information
- Location: 3-9-31 Minamidaira, Hino-shi, Tokyo 191-0041; Japan
- Coordinates: 35.6546°N 139.392°E
- Operator: Keio Corporation
- Line: Keio Line
- Distance: 32.1 km from Shinjuku
- Platforms: 2 side platforms
- Tracks: 2

Other information
- Station code: KO30
- Website: [ Official website]

History
- Opened: April 28, 1926; 100 years ago

Passengers
- FY2019: 10,722

Services
Preceding station	Keio Corporation	Following station
Hirayamajōshi-kōen towards Keiō-hachiōji	Keiō Line Semi Express Rapid Local	Takahatafudō towards Shinjuku
Location
- Location within Tokyo Location within Japan

Minamidaira Station (南平駅, Minamidaira-eki) is a passenger railway station located in the city of Hino, Tokyo, Japan, operated by the private railway company, Keio Corporation.

== Lines ==
Minamidaira Station is served by the Keio Line, and is located 32.1 kilometers from the starting point of the line at Shinjuku Station.

== Station layout ==
This station consists of two opposed ground-level side platforms serving two tracks, connected by a footbridge.

=== Platforms ===
1	Keiō Line	for Keiō-Hachiōji; Keiō Takao Line for Takaosanguchi (via Kitano)
2	Keiō Line	for Chōfu, Meidaimae, Sasazuka, and Shinjuku; Keiō Dōbutsuen Line for Tama-Dōbutsukōen (via Takahatafudō); Toei Shinjuku Line

== History ==
The station opened on April 28, 1926.

== Passenger statistics ==
In fiscal 2019, the station was used by an average of 10,722 passengers daily.

The passenger figures for previous years are as shown below.

Fiscal year	Daily average
2005	11,067
2010	10,821
2015	10,885

== Surrounding area ==
- Tokyo Metropolitan Road No. 173
- Minamidaira Hill Park
- Ministry of the Environment Waterbird Relief Training Center
- Wild Bird Society of Japan Bird and Green International Center
- Tokyo Metropolitan Minamidaira High School

== See also ==
- List of railway stations in Japan
