= Keiō-katakura Station =

Railway station in Hachiōji, Tokyo, Japan

Keiō-katakura Station 京王片倉駅

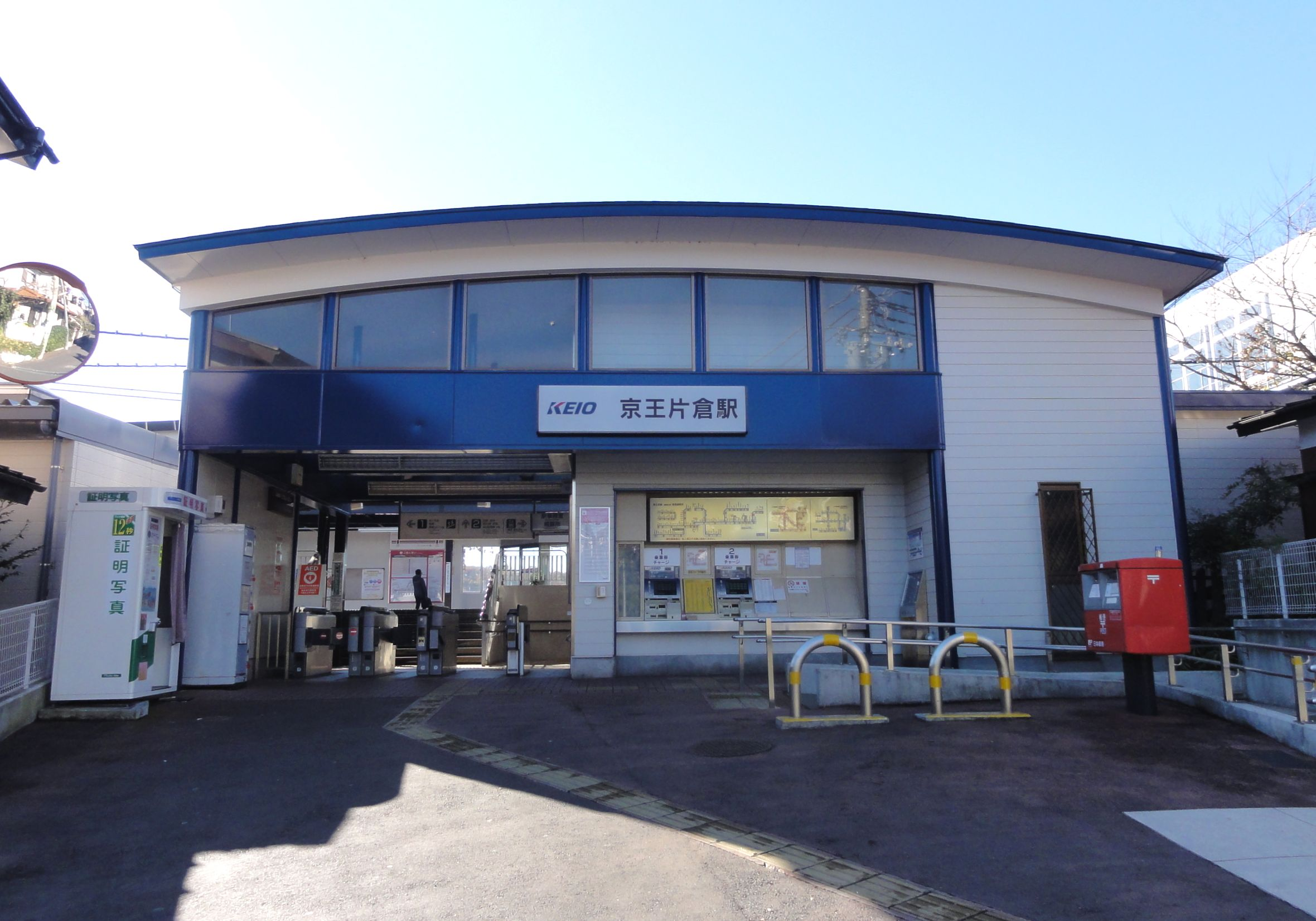
- Keiō-katakura Station, December 2011

General information
- Location: 34-9 Katakura-cho, Hachiōji-shi, Tokyo 192-0914; Japan
- Coordinates: 35°38′39.7″N 139°20′14.3″E
- Operator: Keio Corporation
- Line: Keio Line
- Distance: 37.8 km from Shinjuku
- Platforms: 2 side platforms
- Tracks: 2

Other information
- Station code: KO48
- Website: Official website

History
- Opened: March 20, 1931

Passengers
- FY2019: 5,054

Services
Preceding station	Keio Corporation	Following station
Yamada towards Takaosanguchi	Takao Line Semi Express Rapid Local	Kitano Terminus
Location
- Location within Tokyo Location within Japan

Keiō-Katakura Station (京王片倉駅, Keiō-Katakura-eki) is a passenger railway station located in the city of Hachiōji, Tokyo, Japan, operated by the private railway operator Keio Corporation.

== Lines ==
Keiō-Katakura Station is served by the Keio Takao Line, and is located 1.7 kilometers from the terminus of the line at Kitano and 37.8 kilometers from Shinjuku Station.

== Station layout ==
This station consists of two ground-level opposed side platforms serving two tracks.

=== Platforms ===
1	■ Keiō Takao Line	Takao, Takaosanguchi
2	■ Keiō Takao Line	Kitano, Shinjuku

== History ==
The station opened on March 20, 1931 as Katakura Station (片倉駅). It was renamed to its present name on October 1, 1967.

== Passenger statistics ==
In fiscal 2019, the station was used by an average of 5,054 passengers daily.

The passenger figures (boarding passengers only) for previous years are as shown below.

Fiscal year	daily average
2005	4,069
2010	4,186
2015	4,699

== Surrounding area ==
- Japan National Route 16
- Hachioji City Hall Yui Office
- Hachioji City Yui Junior High School
- Hachioji Katakura Post Office

== See also ==
- List of railway stations in Japan
