= Yamada (disambiguation) =

Yamada is a Japanese surname.

Yamada may also refer to:

== Places ==
- Yamada, Chiba-machi, a former town in Chiba Prefecture
- Yamada, Fukuoka-shi, a former city in Fukuoka Prefecture
- Yamada District, Gunma, a former district in Gunma Prefecture
- Yamada, Iwate-machi, town in Iwate Prefecture
- Yamada, Miyazaki-cho, a former town in Miyazaki Prefecture
- Yamada, Toyama-mura, a former village in Toyama Prefecture

== Other uses ==
- Yamada, a brand used by Umax
- Yamada Corporation, a Japanese defense trading company
- Yamada Station (disambiguation), multiple railway stations in Japan
- Yamada-dera, a former Buddhist temple in Sakurai, Nara Prefecture, Japan
- Yamada Denki
