= Hazama Station =

Hazama Station is the name of two train stations in Japan:

- Hazama Station (Kagawa) (羽間駅)
- Hazama Station (Tokyo) (狭間駅)
