= Hirayamajōshi-kōen Station =

Railway station in Hino, Tokyo, Japan

Hirayamajōshi-kōen Station 平山城址公園駅

- Hirayamajōshi-kōen Station, January 2026

General information
- Location: 5-18-10 Hirayama, Hino-shi, Tokyo 191-0043; Japan
- Coordinates: 35.6473°N 139.3798°E
- Operator: Keio Corporation
- Line: Keio Line
- Distance: 33.4 km from Shinjuku
- Platforms: 2 side platforms
- Tracks: 2

Construction
- Structure type: At-grade

Other information
- Station code: KO31
- Website: Official website

History
- Opened: March 24, 1925; 101 years ago
- Former names: Hirayama Station (to 1955)

Passengers
- FY2019: 8,402

Services
| Preceding station | Keio Corporation | Following station |
|---|---|---|
| Naganuma towards Keiō-hachiōji | Keiō Line Semi Express Rapid Local | Minamidaira towards Shinjuku |
Location
- Location within Tokyo Location within Japan

Hirayamajōshi-kōen Station (平山城址公園駅, Hirayamajōshi-kōen-eki) is a passenger railway station located in the city of Hino, Tokyo, Japan, operated by the private railway company, Keio Corporation.

== Lines ==
Hirayamajōshi-kōen Station is served by the Keio Line, and is located 33.4 kilometers from the starting point of the line at Shinjuku Station.

== Station layout ==
This station consists of two opposed ground-level side platforms serving two tracks, connected by a footbridge.

=== Platforms ===
| 1 | Keiō Line | for Keiō-hachiōji; Keiō Takao Line for Takaosanguchi (via Kitano) |
| 2 | Keiō Line | for Chōfu, Meidaimae, Sasazuka, and Shinjuku; Keiō Dōbutsuen Line for Tama-Dōbutsukōen (via Takahatafudō); Toei Shinjuku Line |

== History ==
The station opened on March 24, 1925 as Hirayama Station (平山駅). It was renamed to its present name on September 11, 1955. The station was relocated to its present location on October 23, 1976.

== Passenger statistics ==
In fiscal 2019, the station was used by an average of 8,402 passengers daily.

The passenger figures for previous years are as shown below.

| Fiscal year | Daily average |
|---|---|
| 2005 | 8,873 |
| 2010 | 8,947 |
| 2015 | 8,847 |

== Surrounding area ==
- Sueshige Shrine
- Hino City Hirayama Library
- Nanao Post Office

== See also ==
- List of railway stations in Japan
