= Yamada Station (Tokyo) =

Railway station in Hachiōji, Tokyo, Japan

Yamada Station 山田駅

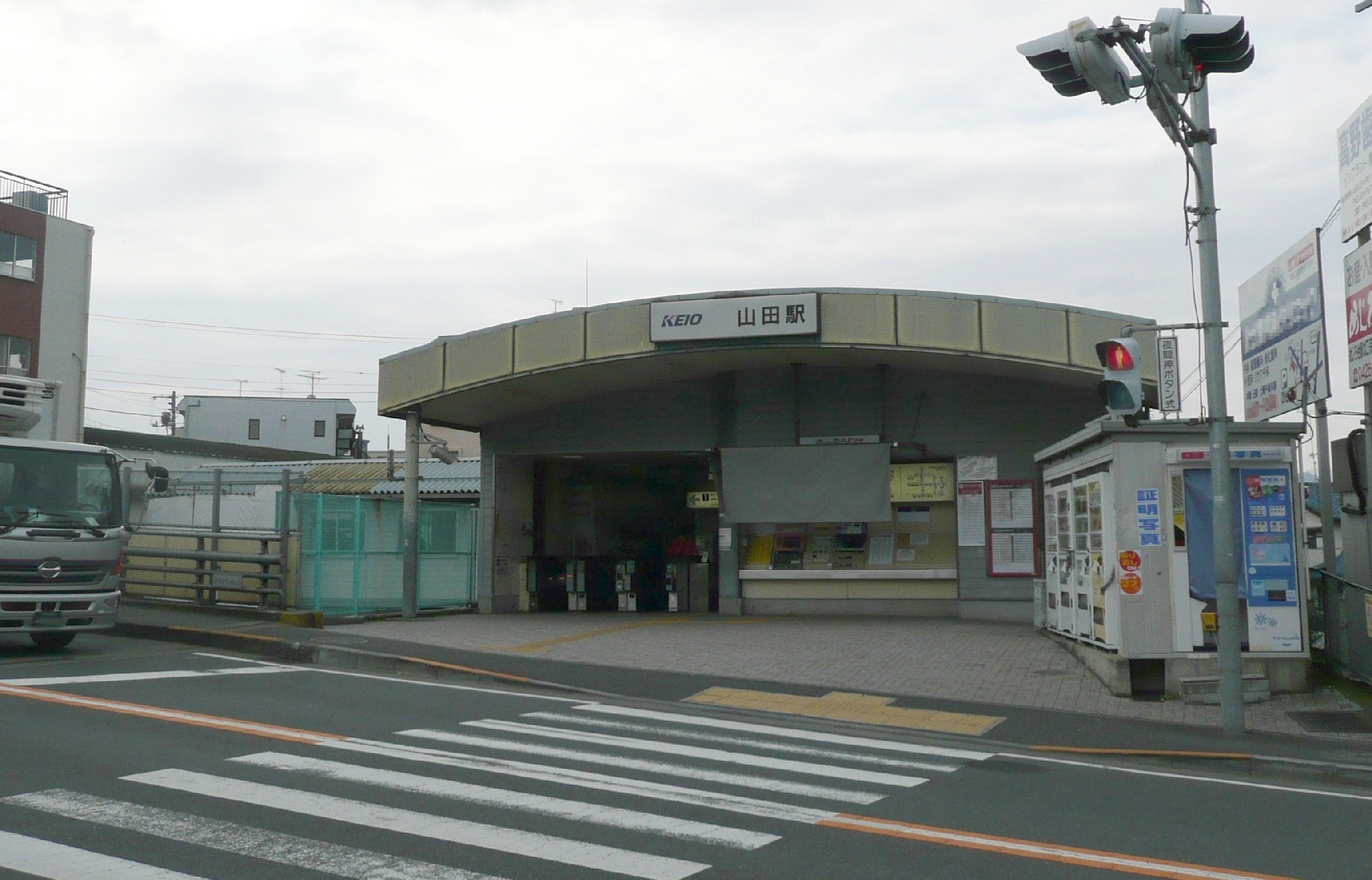
- Yamada Station in October 2008

General information
- Location: 434 Midori-cho, Hachiōji-shi, Tokyo 193-0932; Japan
- Coordinates: 35°38′40″N 139°19′16.6″E
- Operator: Keio Corporation
- Line: Keio Line
- Distance: 39.3 km from Shinjuku
- Platforms: 2 side platforms
- Tracks: 2

Other information
- Station code: KO49
- Website: Official website

History
- Opened: 20 March 1931

Passengers
- FY2019: 5231 daily

Services
Preceding station	Keio Corporation	Following station
Mejirodai towards Takaosanguchi	Takao Line Semi Express Rapid Local	Keiō-katakura towards Kitano
Location
- Location within Tokyo Location within Japan

Yamada Station (山田駅, Yamada-eki) is a passenger railway station located in the city of Hachiōji, Tokyo, Japan, operated by the private railway operator Keio Corporation.

== Lines ==
Yamada Station is served by the Keio Takao Line, and is located 3.2 kilometers from the starting point of the line at Kitano and 39.3 kilometers from Shinjuku Station.

== Station layout ==
This station consists of two ground-level opposed side platforms serving two tracks, connected by a footbridge.

=== Platforms ===
1	■ Keiō Takao Line	for Takao and Takaosanguchi
2	■ Keiō Takao Line	for Kitano and Shinjuku

== History ==
The station opened on 20 March 1931.

== Passenger statistics ==
In fiscal 2019, the station was used by an average of 5,231 passengers daily.

The passenger figures (boarding passengers only) for previous years are as shown below.

Fiscal year	daily average
2005	4,069
2010	4,653
2015	5,152

== Surrounding area ==
- Koen-ji
- Fujimori Park
- Tama Youth Detention Center
- Municipal Midorimachi Cemetery

== See also ==
- List of railway stations in Japan
