= Kamiyugi Park Baseball Field =

Baseball field in Tokyo, Japan

Coordinates: 35°37′05″N 139°22′02″E

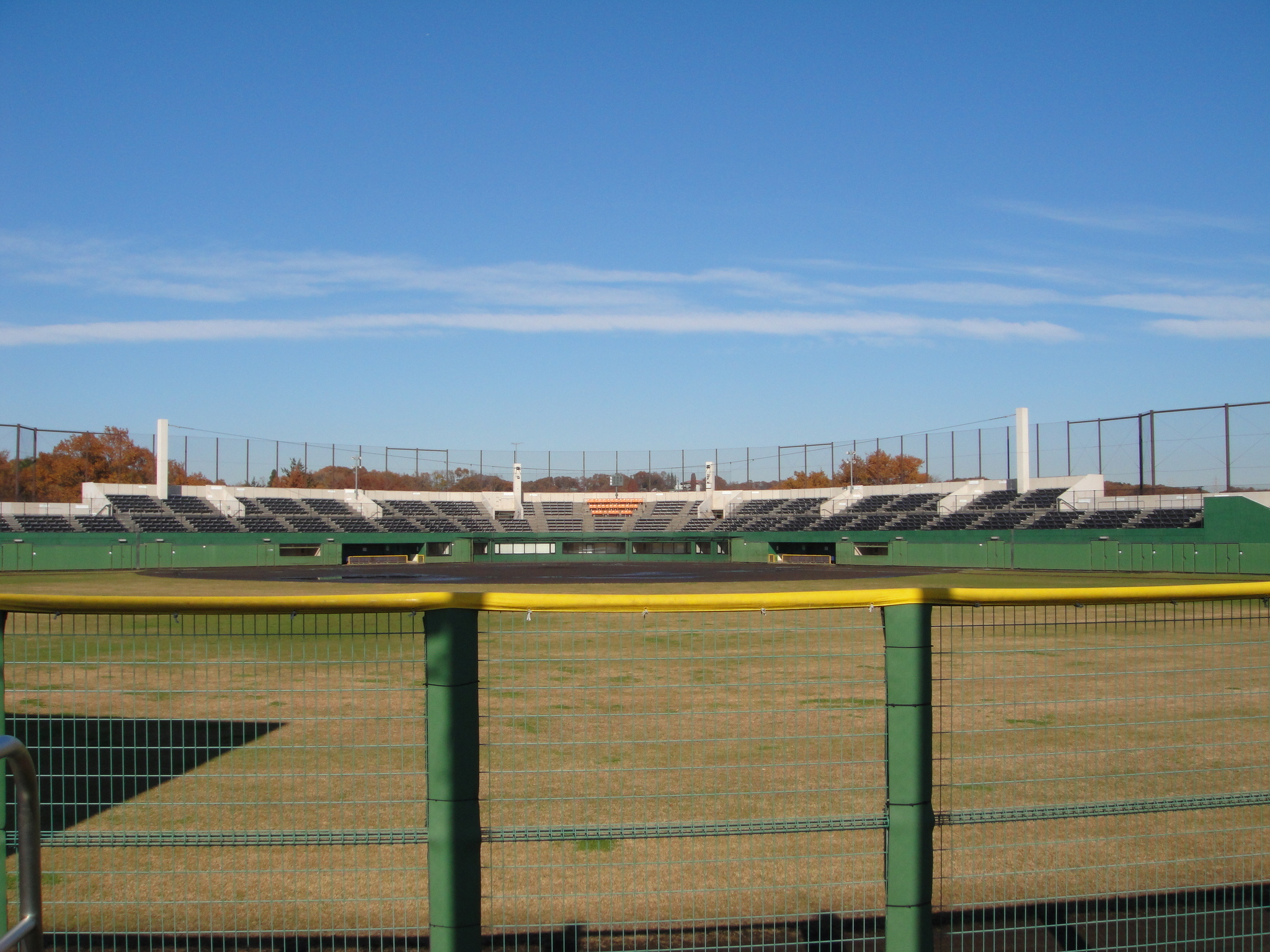
- Interactive map of Kamiyugi Park Baseball Field
- Full name: Kamiyugi Park Baseball Field
- Location: Hachioji, Tokyo
- Capacity: 3,000

Kamiyugi Park Baseball Field, also known as Kamiyugi Baseball Stadium, (上柚木公園野球場) is a baseball field located in Hachioji, Tokyo, Japan.

== Overview ==
It opened in October 2000. Both sides are 98 meters in length and the longest sides measure 122 meters. The infield area has a clay surface while the outfield is a natural lawn. There is a magnetic reversal type of scoreboard. It has a capacity of 3,000 people (1,600 in the inner section, 1,400 in the outer section)

== Transport ==
The baseball field is a walk of about 20 minutes from Minami-ōsawa Station on the Keio Sagamihara Line or it can be reached by bus from the South Exit of Hachioji Station operated by East Japan Railway Company (JR East).

== See also ==
- Baseball in Japan
