= Yamada Station =

Yamada Station (山田駅) is/was the name of four train stations in Japan:

- Yamada Station (Gifu)
- Yamada Station (Osaka)
- Yamada Station (Tokyo)
- The old name of Iseshi Station
