= Tokyo University of Pharmacy and Life Sciences =

Coordinates: 35°38′18.6″N 139°23′1.6″E

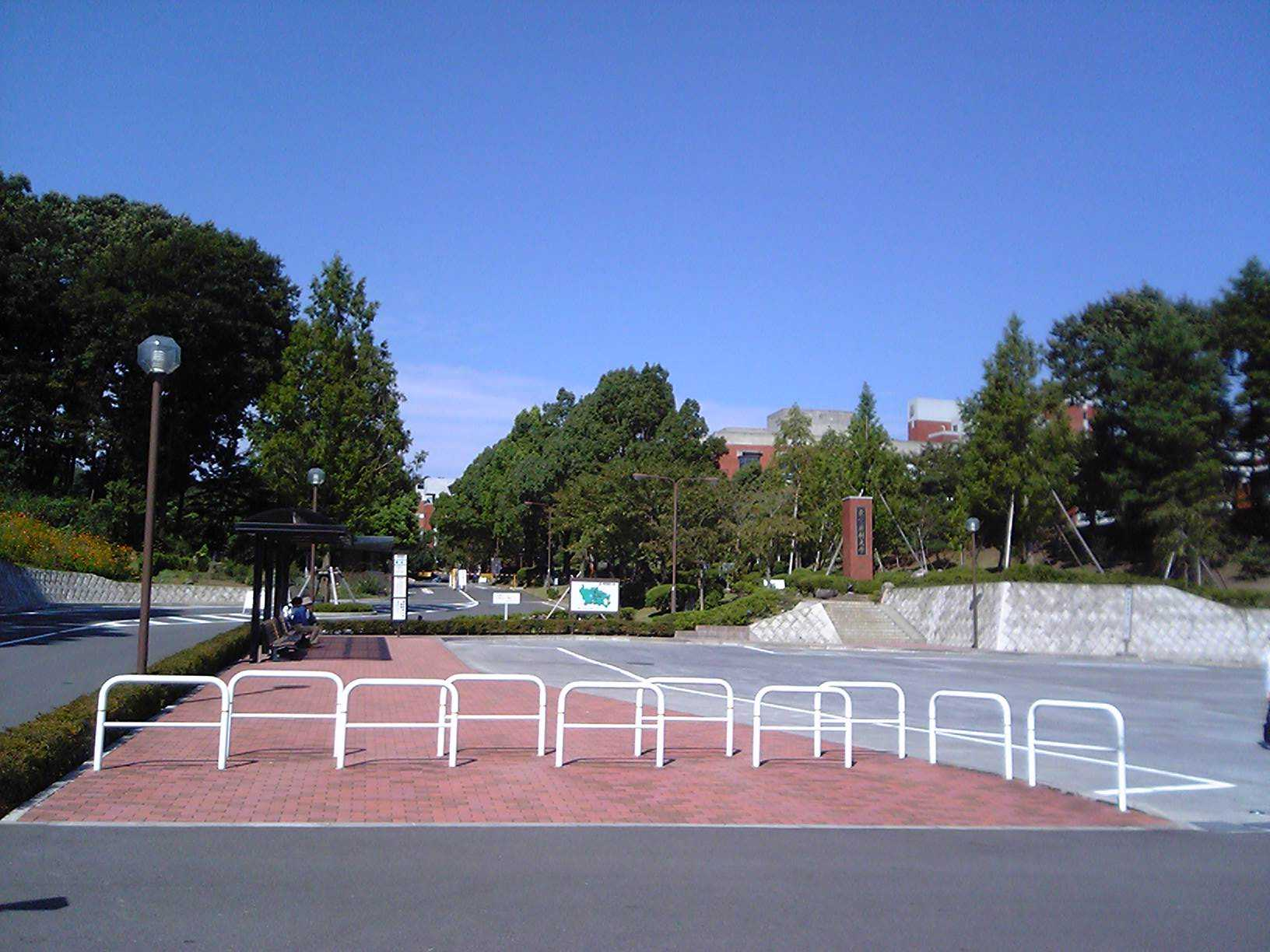
Tokyo University of Pharmacy and Life Sciences

Tokyo University of Pharmacy and Life Sciences (東京薬科大学, Tōkyō yakka daigaku) is a private university in Hachioji, Tokyo, Japan. The precursor of the school was founded in 1880 by Masataka Fujita, and it was chartered as a university in 1949. The school of Life sciences was established in 1994.

== Notable alumni ==
- Jun Matsumoto, a member of the House of Representatives in the Diet of Japan
- Chang Kuo Chou, a Taiwanese pharmacist
