= Mount Jinba =

Mountain in Tokyo, Japan

Coordinates: 35°39′08″N 139°10′00″E

Mount Jinba (陣馬山, Jinba-san) is located between Hachiōji, Tokyo and Sagamihara, Kanagawa Prefecture. Its peak is roughly 857 m (2,812 ft) above sea level.
