= Naganuma Station (Tokyo) =

Railway station in Hachiōji, Tokyo, Japan

Naganuma Station 長沼駅

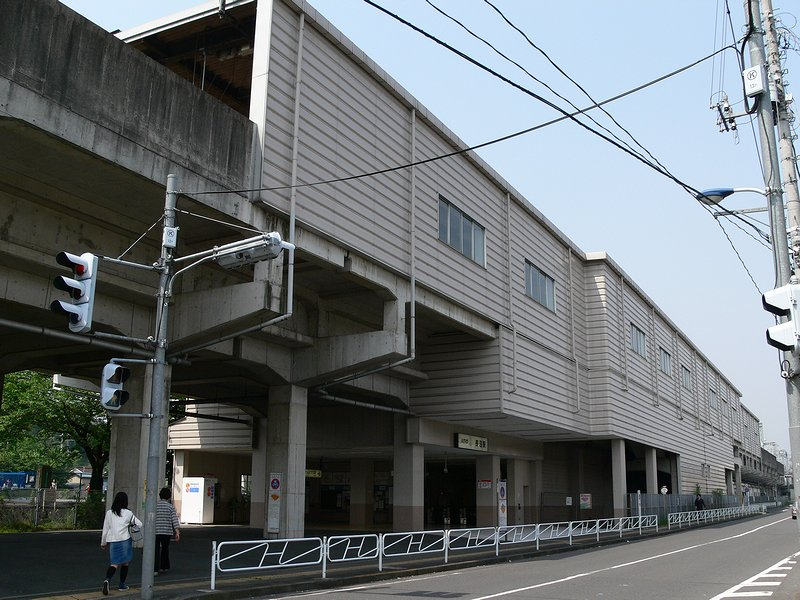
- Naganuma Station, May 2007

General information
- Location: 700 Naganuma-cho, Hachiōji-shi, Tokyo 192-0907; Japan
- Coordinates: 35°38′33″N 139°21′57″E
- Operator: Keio Corporation
- Line: Keio Line
- Distance: 34.9 km from Shinjuku
- Platforms: 2 side platforms
- Tracks: 2

Other information
- Station code: KO32
- Website: Official website

History
- Opened: March 24, 1925; 101 years ago

Passengers
- FY2019: 4,034

Services
Preceding station	Keio Corporation	Following station
Kitano towards Keiō-hachiōji	Keiō Line Semi Express Rapid Local	Hirayamajōshi-kōen towards Shinjuku
Location
- Location within Tokyo Location within Japan

Naganuma Station (長沼駅, Naganuma-eki) is a passenger railway station located in the city of Hachiōji, Tokyo, Japan, operated by the private railway operator Keio Corporation.

== Lines ==
Naganuma Station is served by the Keio Line, and is located 34.9 kilometers from the starting point of the line at Shinjuku Station.

== Station layout ==
This station consists of two opposed elevated side platforms serving two tracks, with the station building located above underneath.

=== Platforms ===
1	Keiō Line	for Keiō-Hachiōji; Keiō Takao Line for Takaosanguchi (via Kitano)
2	Keiō Line	for Chōfu, Meidaimae, Sasazuka, and Shinjuku; Keiō Dōbutsuen Line for Tama-Dōbutsukōen (via Takahatafudō); Toei Shinjuku Line

== History ==
The station opened on March 24, 1925. It was rebuilt with elevated tracks in 1990.

== Passenger statistics ==
In fiscal 2019, the station was used by an average of 4,034 passengers daily.

The passenger figures (boarding passengers only) for previous years are as shown below.

Fiscal year	daily average
2005	4,721
2010	4,208
2015	4,148

== Surrounding area ==
- Naganuma Park

== See also ==
- List of railway stations in Japan
