= Nihon Bunka University =

Private university in Tokyo, Japan

Coordinates: 35°38′4.7″N 139°20′29.2″E

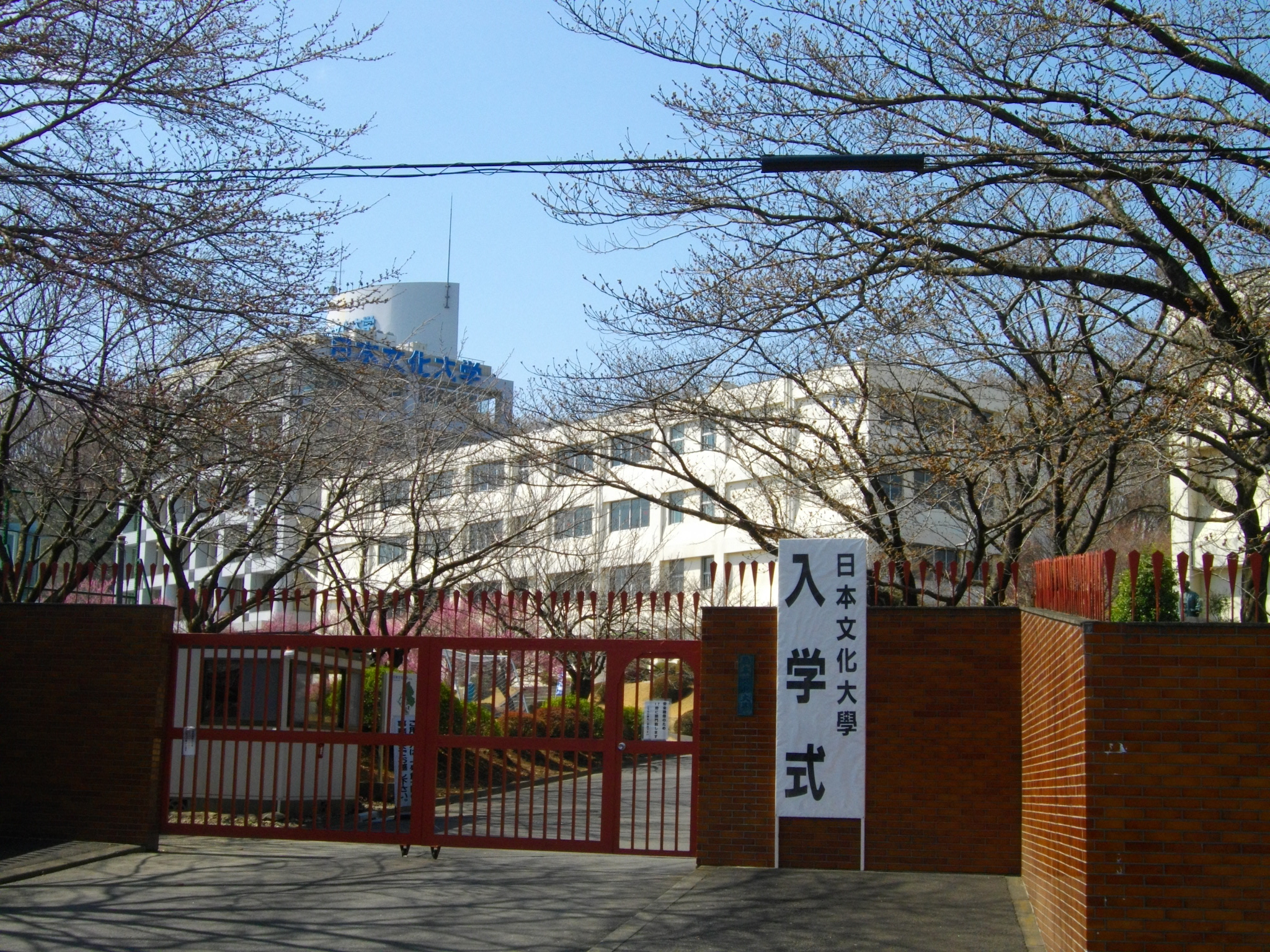

Nihon Bunka University (日本文化大学, Nihon bunka daigaku) is a private university in Hachioji, Tokyo, Japan, established in 1978.

The School was founded by Chikatsugu Ninagawa. Chikatsugu Ninagawa sought to create a school that had a focus on Japanese Tradition and Culture.
