= Kamiyugi Park Athletic Stadium =

Athletic field in Hachioji, Tokyo, Japan

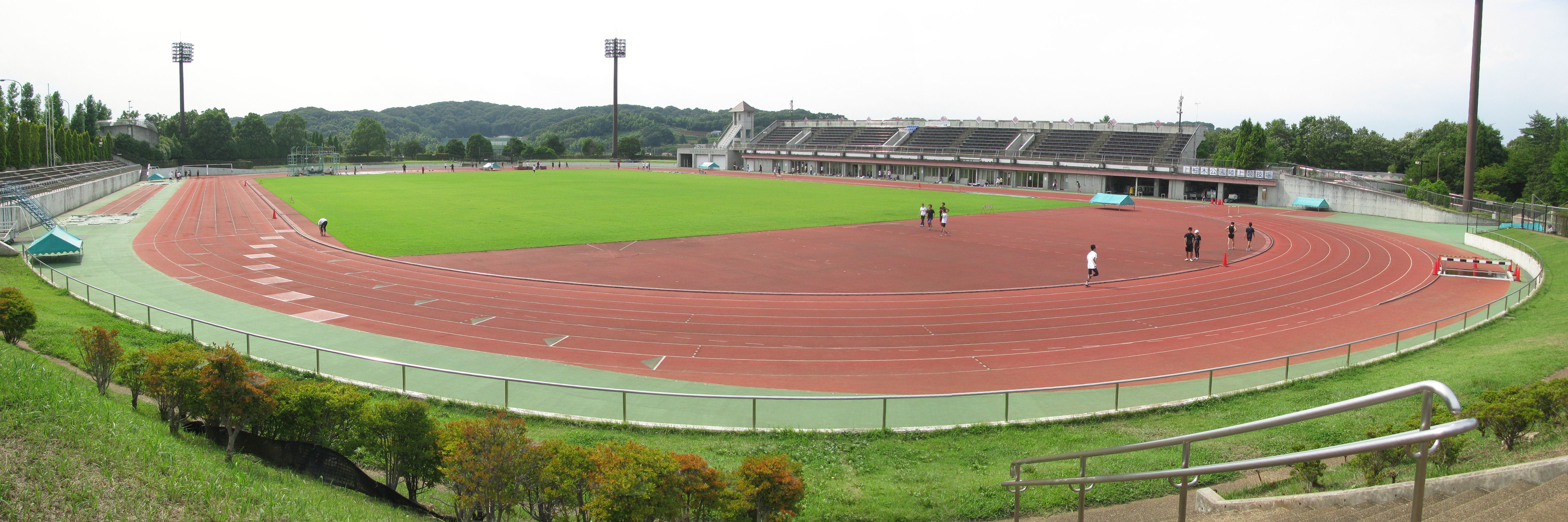

- Location in Tokyo
- Full name: Kamiyugi Park Athletic Stadium
- Location: 2-40-1 Kamiyugi, Hachioji, Tokyo
- Coordinates: 35°37′10″N 139°22′12″E
- Owner: Hachioji
- Operator: Hachioji College Community & Culture Fureiai Foundation
- Capacity: 5,007
- Field size: Lap length is 400 meters

Kamiyugi Park Athletic Stadium (上柚木公園 陸上競技場), also known as Kamiyugi Stadium or Kamiyugi Koen Field, is a Category 2 athletic field authorised by the Japan Association of Athletics Federations and located in Hachioji, Tokyo, Japan.

== Overview ==
It has an area of 106 by 69.5 meters and a lap length of 400 meters, with eight lanes. It has an all-weather track and photo finish equipment.

== Transport ==
The stadium is about 20 minutes on foot from Minami-ōsawa Station on the Keio Sagamihara Line or it can be reached by bus from the South Exit of Hachioji Station operated by East Japan Railway Company (JR East).
