= Mejirodai Station =

Railway station in Hachiōji, Tokyo, Japan

Mejirodai Station めじろ台駅

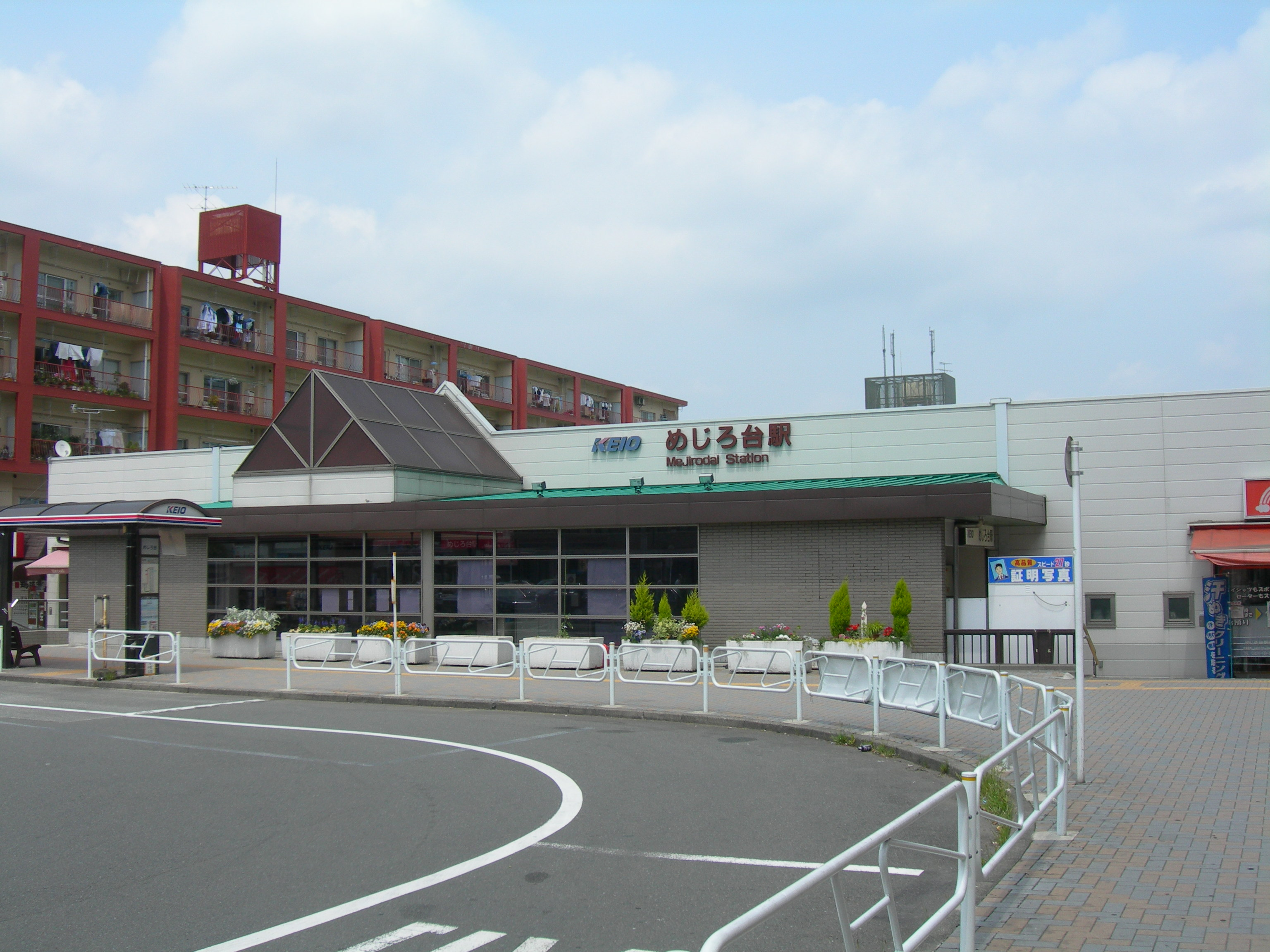
- Mejirodai Station, June 2006

General information
- Location: 1-Mejirodai, Hachiōji-shi, Tokyo 193-0833; Japan
- Coordinates: 35°38′36.2″N 139°18′27.7″E
- Operator: Keio Corporation
- Line: Keio Line
- Distance: 40.4 km from Shinjuku
- Platforms: 2 side platforms
- Tracks: 2

Other information
- Station code: KO50
- Website: Official website

History
- Opened: October 1, 1967

Passengers
- FY2019: 16,780

Services
| Preceding station | Keio Corporation | Following station |
|---|---|---|
| Takao One-way operation | Keiō Line Mt Takao | Kitano towards Shinjuku |
| Takao towards Takaosanguchi | Takao Line Special Express Express | Kitano Terminus |
| Hazama towards Takaosanguchi | Takao Line Semi Express Rapid Local | Yamada towards Kitano |
Location
- Location within Tokyo Location within Japan

Mejirodai Station (めじろ台駅, Mejirodai-eki) is a passenger railway station located in the city of Hachiōji, Tokyo, Japan, operated by the private railway operator Keio Corporation.

== Lines ==
Mejirodai Station is served by the Keio Takao Line, and is located 4.3 kilometers from the terminus of the line at Kitano and 40.4 kilometers from Shinjuku Station.

== Station layout ==
This station consists of two opposed side platforms serving two tracks. The platforms and tracks are in a cutting, and the station building is located on the embankment above.

=== Platforms ===
| 1 | ■ Keiō Takao Line | Takao, Takaosanguchi |
| 2 | ■ Keiō Takao Line | Kitano, Shinjuku |

== History ==
The station opened on October 1, 1967.

== Passenger statistics ==
In fiscal 2019, the station was used by an average of 16,780 passengers daily.

The passenger figures (boarding passengers only) for previous years are as shown below.

| Fiscal year | daily average |
|---|---|
| 2005 | 18,569 |
| 2010 | 18,266 |
| 2015 | 17,830 |

== Surrounding area ==
- Hachioji West Post Office
- Hachioji City Kunugida Archaeological Park

== See also ==
- List of railway stations in Japan
