= Nishi-Hachiōji Station =

Railway station in Hachiōji, Tokyo, Japan

JC23 Nishi-Hachiōji Station 西八王子駅
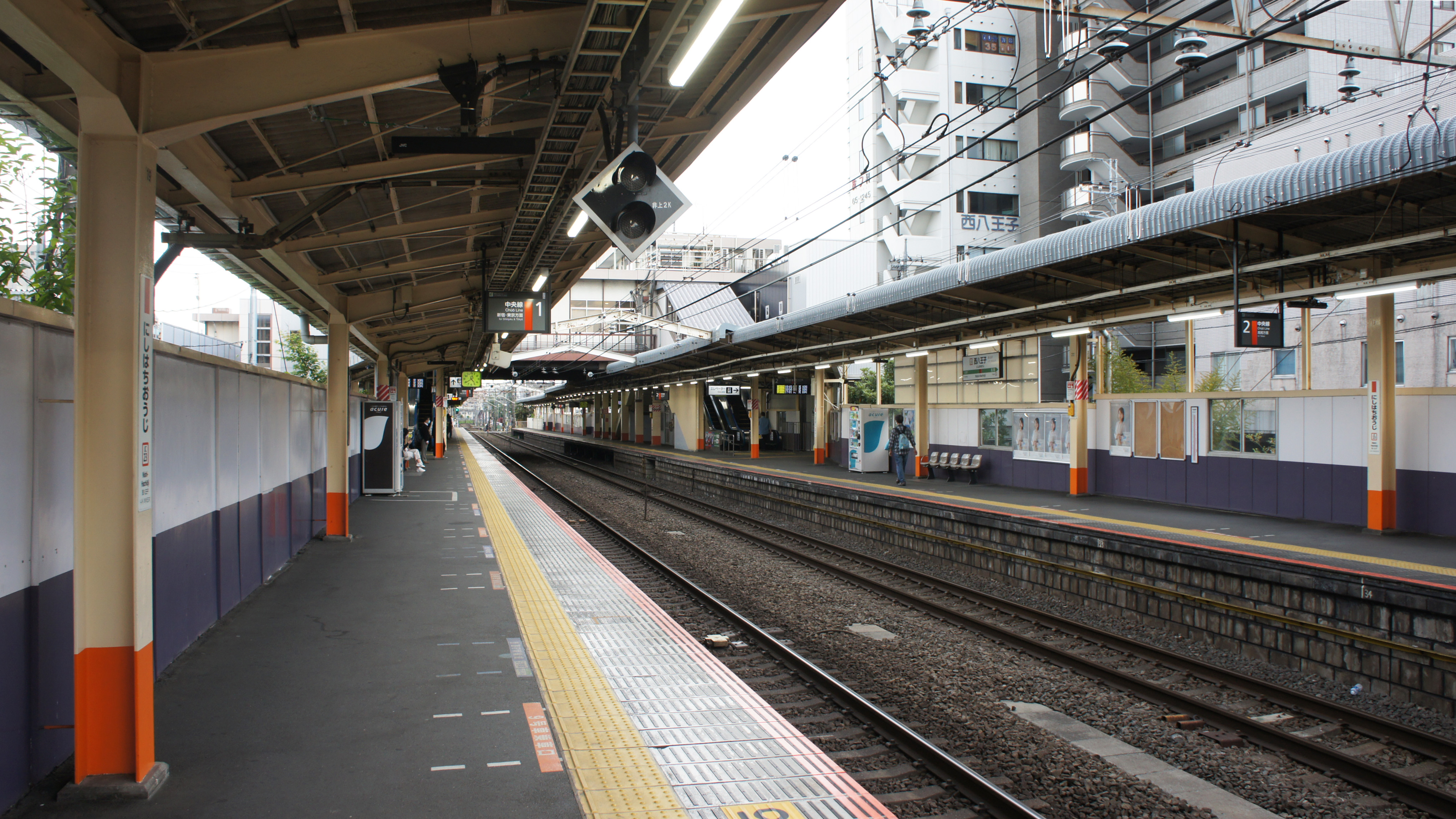
- Platform of JR Chuo-Main-Line Nishi-Hachioji Station, April 2021

General information
- Location: 2-21-1 Sennin-machi, Hachiōji City, Tokyo 193-0835; Japan
- Coordinates: 35°39′24.4008″N 139°18′45.0324″E
- Operator: JR East
- Lines: Chūō Line (Rapid); Chūō Main Line
- Distance: 39.5 km (24.5 mi) from Shinjuku
- Platforms: 2 side platforms
- Tracks: 2

Construction
- Structure type: At grade

Other information
- Status: Staffed
- Station code: JC23
- Website: Official website

History
- Opened: 1 April 1939; 87 years ago

Passengers
- FY2024: 60,272 (daily) ▲3.19%

Services
| Preceding station | JR East | Following station |
|---|---|---|
| Takao JC24 towards Shiojiri | Chūō Main Line Local | Hachiōji JC22 towards Tachikawa |
| Takao JC24 towards Ōtsuki | Chūō Line Chūō Special Rapid | Hachiōji JC22 towards Tokyo |
| Takao JC24 towards Ōtsuki | Chūō Line Commuter Rapid | Hachiōji One-way operation |
| Takao JC24 towards Ōtsuki | Chūō Line Rapid | Hachiōji JC22 towards Tokyo |
Location
- Location within Tokyo Location within Kanto Area Location within Japan

Nishi-Hachiōji Station (西八王子駅, Nishi-Hachiōji-eki) is a passenger railway station located in the city of Hachiōji, Tokyo, Japan, operated by East Japan Railway Company (JR East).

== Lines ==
Nishi-Hachiōji Station is served by the Chūō Main Line with also Chūō Line (Rapid) limited stop services from Tokyo. The station is 49.8 kilometers from Tokyo Station.

== Station layout ==
The station consists of two ground-level opposed side platforms serving two tracks with the platforms connected by the elevated station building, which is located above and perpendicular to the tracks. The station is attended.

=== Platforms ===
| 1 | ■ Chūō Main Line | for Hachiōji, Takao, Ōtsuki, and Kōfu |
| 2 | ■ Chūō Main Line | for Tachikawa, Mitaka, Shinjuku, and Tokyo |

== History ==
Nishi-Hachiōji Station opened on 1 April 1939. The original station building was destroyed in an air raid on 2 August 1945. With the privatization of Japanese National Railways (JNR) on 1 April 1987, the station came under the control of JR East.

== Passenger statistics ==
In fiscal 2019, the station was used by an average of 31,823 passengers daily (boarding passengers only).

The passenger figures (boarding passengers only) for previous years are as shown below.

| Fiscal year | daily average |
|---|---|
| 2005 | 29,576 |
| 2010 | 30,992 |
| 2015 | 32,086 |

== Surrounding area ==
- Hachiōji City Hall
- Japan National Route 20
- Hosei University - Hachiōji campus

== See also ==
- List of railway stations in Japan
