= Chang Kuo-chou =

- 張國周
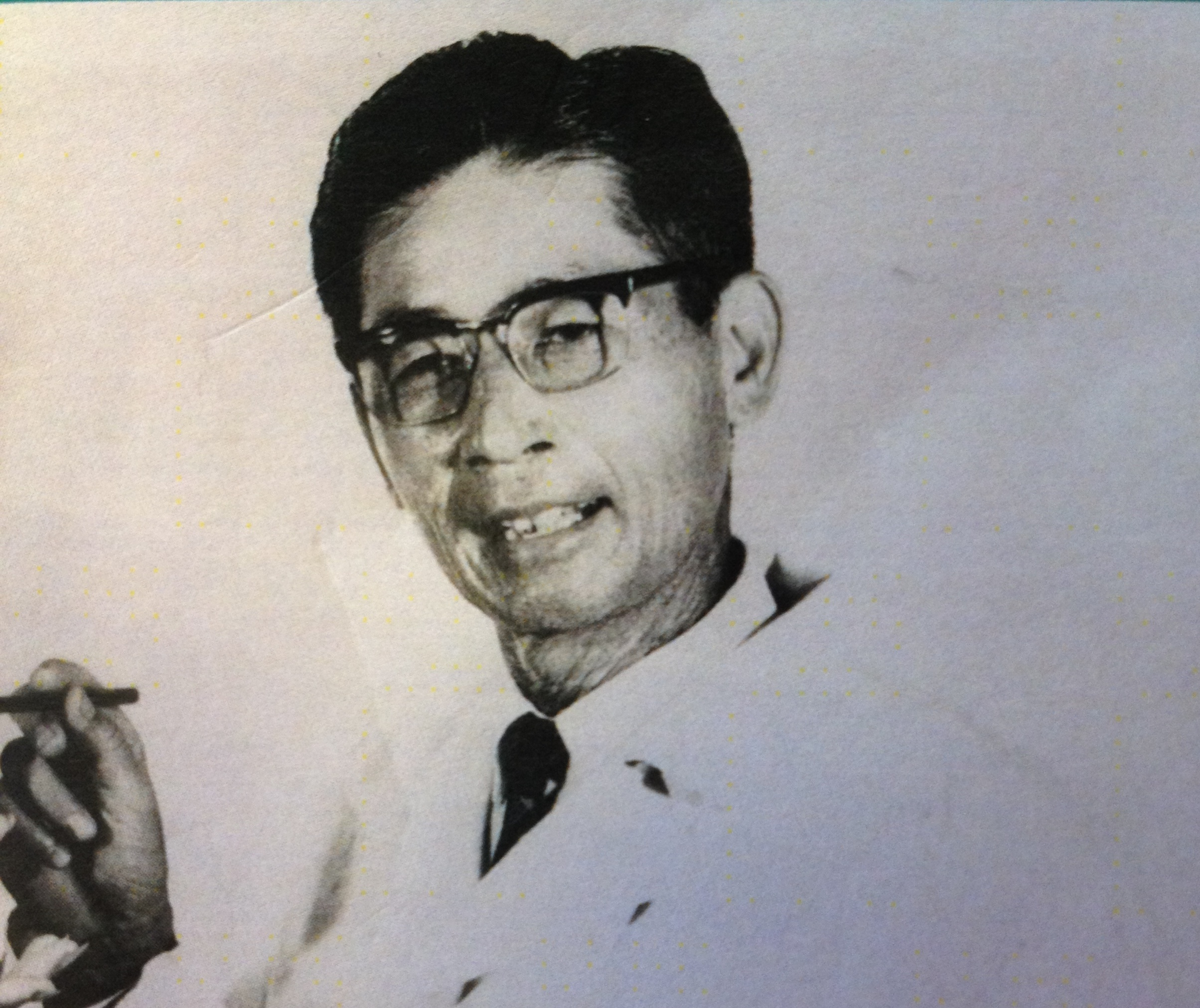
- Born: 1 February 1906; Chiayi County, Taiwan, Empire of Japan
- Died: 24 August 1975 (aged 69)
- Education: Tokyo University of Pharmacy and Life Sciences
- Occupation: Pharmacist

Chang Kuo Chou (Chinese: 張國周; pinyin: Zhāng Guózhōu; 1 February 1906 – 24 August 1975) was a Taiwanese scholar, calligrapher, and is widely considered to be the Father of Pharmaceutical Sciences.

== Early life ==
Chang was born and grew up in Chiayi, near present day Tainan. Although assigned to farm labor, during his free time Chang showed a keen interest for learning with activities such as writing Chinese characters on the ground.

== Education and career ==
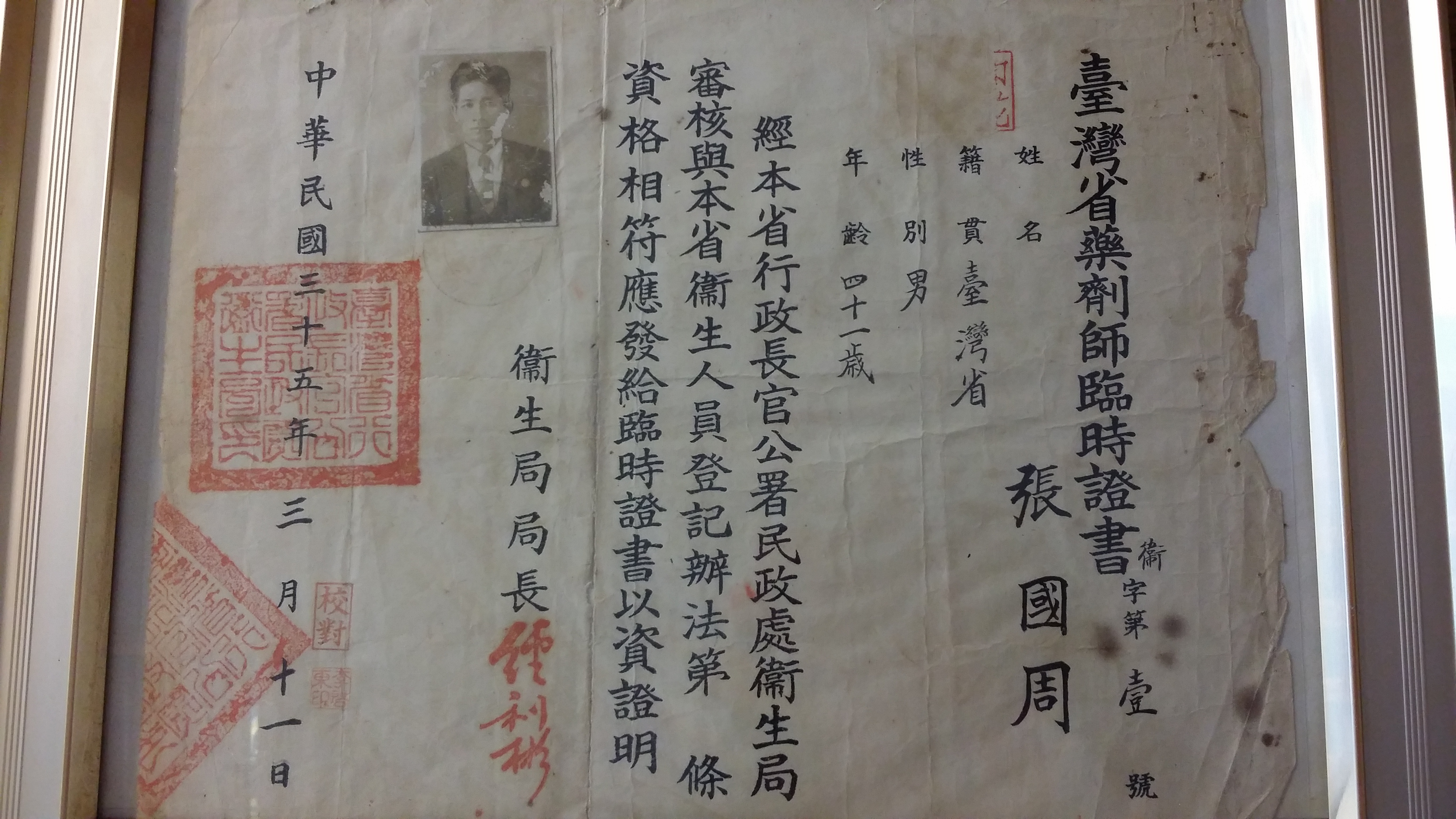
First post-war pharmacist license issued by Taiwan

At a time when illiteracy and poverty were common, Chang convinced JiaYi (嘉義), the village elder to subsidize his education in Japan. In 1930, Chang graduated from Japan’s Tokyo University of Pharmacy and Life Sciences and returned to Taiwan to be the country’s first pharmacist. Over the next few years he used compounding techniques and revolutionized medicine by creating a set of powdered formulas that incorporated elements of both western and eastern medicine. His products are still popular today. Stomachin is Taiwan’s number one selling powdered medicine. His book, Essentials of Pharmacopia 藥典輯要 is still available today.

== Calligraphy ==
Chang Kuo Chou's calligraphy works won many awards including Japanese Calligraphy and Taiwanese Banner (參加「日本書道作振會」之兩件作品分別為楷書〈永成家之光〉條幅及行書〈趙孟頫題董元溪岸圖〉條幅 皆獲得「入選」).
