= Hazama Station (Tokyo) =

Railway station in Hachiōji, Tokyo, Japan

Hazama Station 狭間駅

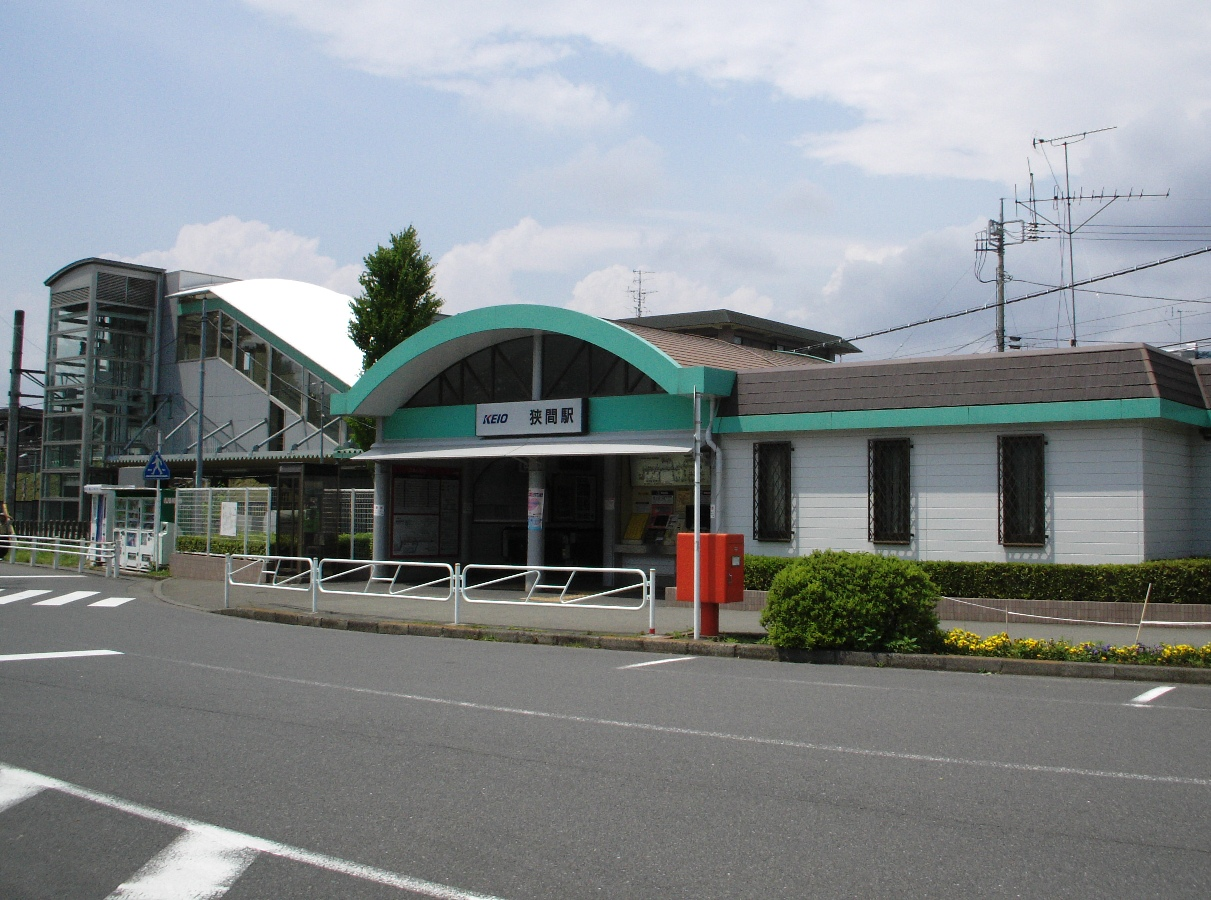
- Hazama Station, June 2006

General information
- Location: 773 Higashi-Asakawa-machi, Hachiōji-shi, Tokyo 193-0941; Japan
- Coordinates: 35.6408°N 139.2937°E
- Operator: Keio Corporation
- Line: Keio Line
- Distance: 41.9 km from Shinjuku
- Platforms: 2 side platforms
- Tracks: 2

Other information
- Station code: KO51
- Website: Official website

History
- Opened: October 1, 1967

Passengers
- FY2019: 7,820

Services
| Preceding station | Keio Corporation | Following station |
|---|---|---|
| Takao towards Takaosanguchi | Takao Line Semi Express Rapid Local | Mejirodai towards Kitano |
Location
- Location within Tokyo Location within Japan

Hazama Station (狭間駅, Hazama-eki) is a passenger railway station located in the city of Hachiōji, Tokyo, Japan, operated by the private railway operator Keio Corporation.

== Lines ==
Hazama Station is served by the Keio Takao Line, and is located 5.8 kilometers from the terminus of the line at Kitano and 41.9 kilometers from Shinjuku Station.

== Station layout ==
This station consists of two ground-level opposed side platforms serving two tracks, connected by a footbridge.

=== Platforms ===
| 1 | ■ Keiō Takao Line | Takao, Takaosanguchi |
| 2 | ■ Keiō Takao Line | Kitano, Shinjuku |

== History ==
The station opened on October 1, 1967.

== Passenger statistics ==
In fiscal 2019, the station was used by an average of 7,820 passengers daily.

The passenger figures (boarding passengers only) for previous years are as shown below.

| Fiscal year | daily average |
|---|---|
| 2005 | 5,806 |
| 2010 | 6,815 |
| 2015 | 7,567 |

== Surrounding area ==
- Japan Swimming School Hachioji
- National College of Technology Headquarters

== See also ==
- List of railway stations in Japan
