= Hachiōji =

Hachiōji 八王子市
- Core city
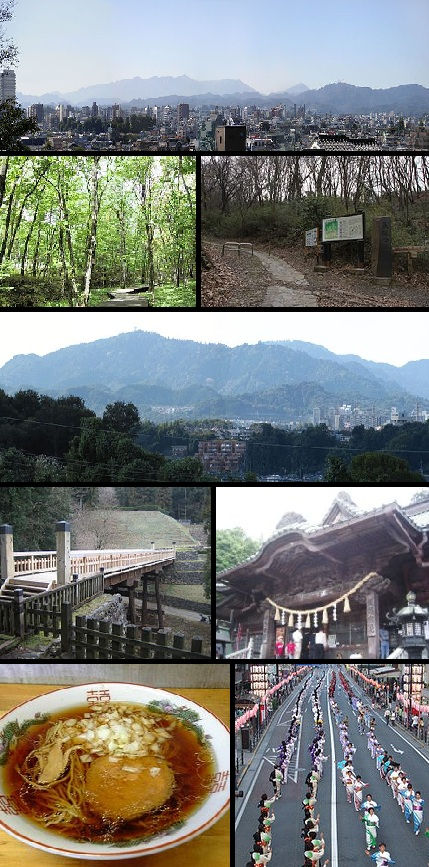
- View of top left, Downtown Hachioji, Komiya Park, Naganuma Park, Mount Takao, stone fence and bridge in Hachioji Castle site, Yakuoin in Mount Takao, Hachioji Ramen, Hachioji Traditional Festival on August

- Flag Seal
- Interactive map of Hachiōji
- Hachiōji (Tokyo)
- Coordinates: 35°39′59.2″N 139°18′57.6″E
- Country: Japan
- Region: Kantō
- Prefecture: Tokyo
- First official recorded: 3rd century AD (official)
- Town settled: April 1, 1889
- City settled: September 1, 1917

Government
  - Mayor: Kazuo Shiyake (Since January 2024)

Area
  - Total: 186.38 km^{2} (71.96 sq mi)

Population (March 2021)
  - Total: 561,344
  - Density: 3,011.8/km^{2} (7,800.6/sq mi)
- Time zone: UTC+9 (Japan Standard Time)
- Phone number: 042-626-3111
- Address: 3-24-1 Motohongo-cho, Hachiōji-shi, Tokyo 192-8501
- Climate: Cfa
- Website: Official website
- Symbols
- Bird: Blue-and-white flycatcher
- Flower: Lilium auratum
- Tree: Ginkgo biloba

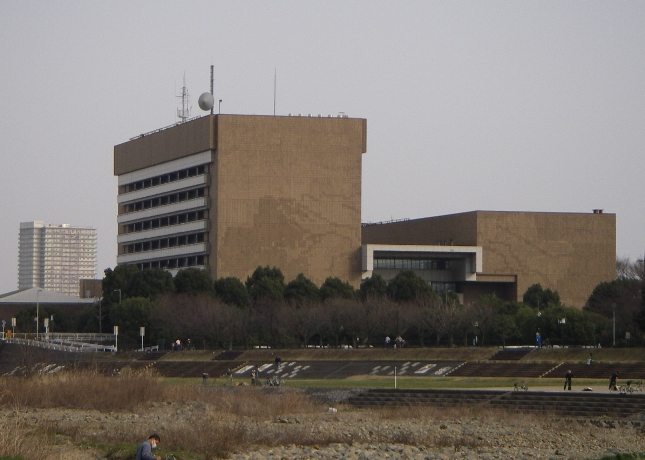
Hachiōji City Hall

Hachiōji (八王子市, Hachiōji-shi) is a city located in the western portion of the Tokyo Metropolis, Japan. As of 31 March 2021, the city has an estimated population of 561,344, and a population density of 3,000 persons per km^{2}. The total area of the city is 186.38 km^{2} (71.96 sq mi). It is the most populous city in Tokyo outside of the special wards. In 2015, it was designated as a core city for the first time in Tokyo. It was the second city in Tokyo Prefecture (present-day Tokyo) to implement the municipal system after Tokyo City (present-day Tokyo's 23 wards).

== Geography ==
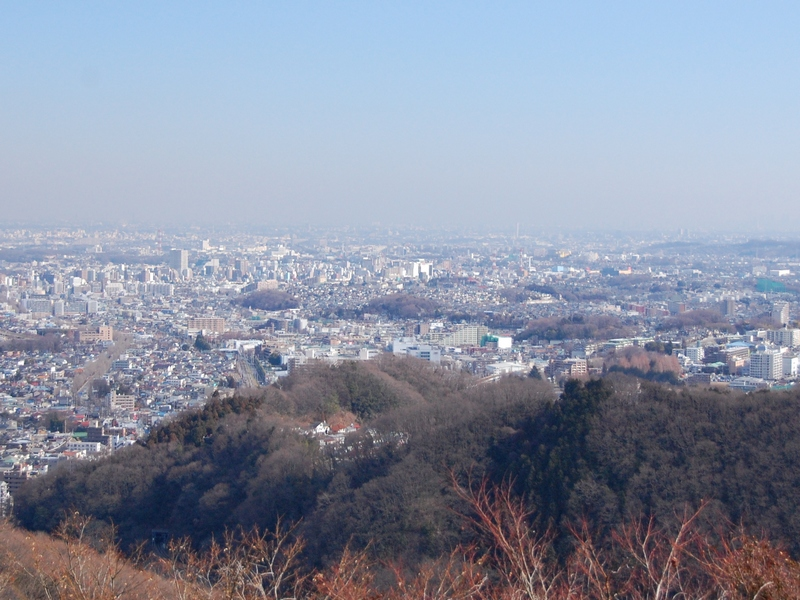
Urban area of Hachiōji

Hachiōji is located in the foothills of the Okutama Mountains of western Tokyo, about 40 kilometers west of the center of the 23 special wards of Tokyo. The city is surrounded on three sides by mountains, forming the Hachioji Basin which opens up toward the east in the direction of Tokyo. The mountain ranges in the southwest include Mount Takao (599 m) and Mount Jinba (857 m), two popular hiking destinations which can be reached by train and bus, respectively.

=== Surrounding municipalities ===
Kanagawa Prefecture

- Sagamihara

Tokyo Metropolis

- Akiruno
- Akishima
- Fussa
- Hino
- Hinohara
- Machida
- Tama

=== Climate ===
Hachiōji has a humid subtropical climate (Köppen Cfa) characterized by warm summers and cool winters with light to no snowfall. The average annual temperature in Hachiōji is 13.9 °C. The average annual rainfall is 1998 mm with September as the wettest month. The temperatures are highest on average in August, at around 25.3 °C, and lowest in January, at around 2.4 °C.

Climate data for Hachioji (1991−2020 normals, extremes 1976−present)
Month	Jan	Feb	Mar	Apr	May	Jun	Jul	Aug	Sep	Oct	Nov	Dec	Year
Record high °C (°F)	19.9 (67.8)	24.0 (75.2)	26.6 (79.9)	32.2 (90.0)	37.1 (98.8)	36.0 (96.8)	39.3 (102.7)	39.3 (102.7)	39.2 (102.6)	32.7 (90.9)	26.7 (80.1)	26.0 (78.8)	39.3 (102.7)
Mean daily maximum °C (°F)	9.3 (48.7)	10.3 (50.5)	13.7 (56.7)	19.1 (66.4)	23.6 (74.5)	26.0 (78.8)	30.1 (86.2)	31.4 (88.5)	27.1 (80.8)	21.5 (70.7)	16.4 (61.5)	11.7 (53.1)	20.0 (68.0)
Daily mean °C (°F)	3.4 (38.1)	4.5 (40.1)	8.0 (46.4)	13.3 (55.9)	18.1 (64.6)	21.4 (70.5)	25.4 (77.7)	26.4 (79.5)	22.6 (72.7)	16.9 (62.4)	11.1 (52.0)	5.9 (42.6)	14.7 (58.5)
Mean daily minimum °C (°F)	−1.8 (28.8)	−0.9 (30.4)	2.7 (36.9)	7.7 (45.9)	12.9 (55.2)	17.4 (63.3)	21.5 (70.7)	22.4 (72.3)	18.8 (65.8)	13.0 (55.4)	6.4 (43.5)	0.8 (33.4)	10.1 (50.2)
Record low °C (°F)	−8.7 (16.3)	−8.8 (16.2)	−8.1 (17.4)	−2.0 (28.4)	2.6 (36.7)	10.0 (50.0)	13.3 (55.9)	15.4 (59.7)	7.9 (46.2)	2.4 (36.3)	−2.3 (27.9)	−7.6 (18.3)	−8.8 (16.2)
Average precipitation mm (inches)	54.1 (2.13)	46.1 (1.81)	102.9 (4.05)	114.1 (4.49)	124.7 (4.91)	172.0 (6.77)	188.3 (7.41)	212.5 (8.37)	264.4 (10.41)	230.8 (9.09)	80.1 (3.15)	53.1 (2.09)	1,643 (64.69)
Average precipitation days (≥ 1.0 mm)	4.5	4.9	9.2	9.2	10.0	12.7	12.5	10.4	12.2	10.5	7.2	4.9	108.2
Mean monthly sunshine hours	201.1	179.7	174.9	179.3	176.0	119.7	145.1	177.3	128.0	132.4	157.0	184.2	1,954.5
Source: JMA

== Demographics ==
Per Japanese census data, the population of Hachiōji has recently plateaued after nine decades of strong growth.

Historical population
Year	Pop.	±%
1920	78,705	—
1930	95,389	+21.2%
1940	111,028	+16.4%
1950	131,470	+18.4%
1960	164,622	+25.2%
1970	253,407	+53.9%
1980	387,178	+52.8%
1990	466,347	+20.4%
2000	536,046	+14.9%
2010	580,053	+8.2%
2020	579,355	−0.1%

== History ==
The area of present-day Hachiōji was part of ancient Musashi Province. It has been an important junction point and post town along the Kōshū Kaidō, the main road that connected the historical Edo (today's Tokyo) with western Japan. Hachiōji Castle was built during the Sengoku period in 1584 by Hōjō Ujiteru, but was destroyed in 1590 by Toyotomi Hideyoshi. During the Edo period, the area was tenryō controlled directly by the Tokugawa shogunate. In the post-Meiji Restoration cadastral reform of July 22, 1878, the area became part of Minamitama District in Kanagawa Prefecture. The town of Hachiōji was created on April 1, 1889, with the establishment of the modern municipalities system. Minamitama District was transferred to the administrative control of Tokyo Metropolis on April 1, 1893. Hachiōji gained city status on September 1, 1917.

During the 1964 Summer Olympics, the city was host to the cycling events. The Hachioji Velodrome was used for the events.

Hachiōji became a Core city on April 1, 2015, with increased local autonomy.

== Government ==
Hachiōji has a mayor-council form of government with a directly elected mayor and a unicameral city council of 40 members, whose members are elected for a four-year term. Hachiōji contributes five members to the Tokyo Metropolitan Assembly. In terms of national politics, the city is divided between the Tokyo 21st district and Tokyo 24th district of the lower house of the Diet of Japan.

=== Mayors of Hachiōji (1917–present) ===
No.	Name	Term of office	
No.	Name	Took office	Left office
1	Eikichi Shibata {柴田榮吉}	14 December 1917	13 December 1921
2	Teihei Hirabayashi {平林定兵衛}	16 February 1922	25 February 1925
3	Bungo Muto {武藤文吾}	26 May 1925	25 May 1929
4	Fumitaro Akiyama {秋山文太郎}	8 July 1929	4 November 1929
5	Kunisaburo Kidokoro {城所國三郎}	11 December 1929	10 December 1933
6	Tatsuyoshi Mokudai {杢代龍喜}	16 January 1934	15 January 1938

No.	Name	Term of office	
No.	Name	Took office	Left office
7-9	Genpei Sekiya {関谷源兵衛}	22 January 1938	31 August 1942
10	Tomohiko Fukazawa {深沢友彦}	1 September 1942	12 September 1945
11-14	Kichinosuke Kobayashi {小林吉之助}	29 September 1945	6 February 1957
15	Gizo Noguchi {野口義造}	25 February 1957	23 December 1961
16-18	Enji Uetake {植竹圓次}	24 February 1961	23 February 1973
19-22	Soichi Goto {後藤聰一}	24 February 1973	26 December 1983

No.	Name	Term of office	
No.	Name	Took office	Left office
22-25	Shigeo Hatano {波多野重雄}	30 January 1984	28 January 2000
26-28	Ryuichi Kurosu {黒須隆一}	29 January 2000	28 January 2012
29-31	Takashi Ishimori {石森孝志}	29 January 2012	28 January 2024
32	Kazuo Shiyake {初宿和夫}	29 January 2024	Incumbent

== Economy ==
During the Meiji period, Hachiōji prospered as an important location for the production of silk and silk textiles. The industry faded away, however, in the 1960s. Today, Hachiōji mainly serves as a commuter town for people working in Tokyo, and as a location for many large colleges and universities.

== Education ==
=== Colleges and universities ===
- Chuo University (Tama Campus)
- Digital Hollywood University
- Kogakuin University (Hachioji Campus)
- Kyorin University (Hachioji Campus)
- Meisei University (Hino Campus)
- Nihon Bunka University
- Soka University
- Tama Art University (Hachioji Campus)
- Takushoku University (Hachioji Campus)
- Teikyo University (Hachioji Campus)
- Tokyo Junshin University
- Tokyo Kasei-Gakuin University (Machida Campus)
- Tokyo Metropolitan University (Minamiōsawa Campus)
- Tokyo University of Agriculture and Technology
- Tokyo University of Pharmacy and Life Sciences
- Tokyo University of Technology (Hachiōji Campus)
- Tokyo Zokei University
- Nippon Engineering College
- Hachioji Municipal Nursing College

=== Primary and secondary education ===
The Tokyo Metropolitan Government Board of Education operates nine public high schools, and the Hachioji School for the Blind. There are also eleven private high schools.

Metropolitan high schools:

- Minamitama Secondary Education School (junior and senior high)
- Fujimori High School
- Hachioji Higashi High School
- Hachioji Kita High School
- Hachioji Soshi High School
- Hachioji Takushin High School
- Katakura High School
- Matsugaya High School
- Shoyo High School

Hachiōji has 70 public elementary schools and 37 public junior high schools operated by the city government, as well as four public combined elementary/junior high schools.

Combined public elementary and junior high schools:

- Izumi no Mori School (いずみの森義務教育学校)
- Tate (館小中学校)

Municipal junior high schools:

- No. 1 (第一中学校)
- No. 2 (第二中学校)
- No. 4 (第四中学校)
- No. 6 (第六中学校)
- No. 7 (第七中学校)
- Asakawa (浅川中学校)
- Bessho (別所中学校)
- Hiyodoriyama (ひよどり山中学校)
- Ishikawa (石川中学校)
- Kamiyugi (上柚木中学校)
- Kasumi (加住中学校)
- Kawaguchi (川口中学校)
- Konobara (甲ノ原中学校)
- Kunigida (椚田中学校)
- Matsugaya (松が谷中学校)
- Matsugi (松木中学校)
- Minamino (みなみ野中学校)
- Minamiosawa (南大沢中学校)
- Miyagami (宮上中学校)
- Moto Hachioji (元八王子中学校)
- Nagabusa (長房中学校)
- Nakayama (中山中学校)
- Nanakuni (七国中学校)
- Narahara (楢原中学校)
- Ongata (恩方中学校)
- Ryonan (陵南中学校)
- Shiroyama (城山中学校)
- Uchikoshi (打越中学校)
- Yarimizu (鑓水中学校)
- Yokokawa (横川中学校)
- Yokoyama (横山中学校)
- Yotsuya (四谷中学校)
- Yugi (由木中学校)
- Yui (由井中学校)

Municipal elementary schools:

- No. 1 (第一小学校)
- No. 2 (第二小学校)
- No. 3 (第三小学校)
- No. 4 (第四小学校)
- No. 5 (第五小学校)
- No. 7 (第七小学校)
- No. 8 (第八小学校)
- No. 9 (第九小学校)
- No. 10 (第十小学校)
- Akibadai (秋葉台小学校)
- Asakawa (浅川小学校)
- Atago (愛宕小学校)
- Bessho (別所小学校)
- Funeda (船田小学校)
- Higashi Asakawa (東浅川小学校)
- Kami Ichibukata (上壱分方小学校)
- Kami Kawaguchi (上川口小学校)
- Kami Yugi (上柚木小学校)
- Kashima (鹿島小学校)
- Kashiwagi (柏木小学校)
- Kasumi (加住小学校)
- Katakuradai (片倉台小学校)
- Kawaguchi (川口小学校)
- Komiya (小宮小学校)
- Kunugida (椚田小学校)
- Nagaike (長池小学校)
- Matsugaya (松が谷小学校)
- Matsugi (松木小学校)
- Midorigaoka (緑が丘小学校)
- Minamino (みなみ野小学校)
- Minamino Kimita (みなみ野君田小学校)
- Minami Osawa (南大沢小学校)
- Miyakami (宮上小学校)
- Miyama (美山小学校)
- Moto Hachioji (元八王子小学校)
- Moto Hachioji Higashi (元八王子東小学校)
- Motoki (元木小学校)
- Nagabusa (長房小学校)
- Naganuma (長沼小学校)
- Nakano Kita (中野北小学校)
- Nakayama (中山小学校)
- Nanakuni (七国小学校)
- Narahara (楢原小学校)
- Matsue (松枝小学校)
- Nibukata (弐分方小学校)
- Ongata No. 1 (恩方第一小学校)
- Ongata No. 2 (恩方第二小学校)
- Owada (大和田小学校)
- Sanda (散田小学校)
- Shimizu (清水小学校)
- Shimo Yugi (下柚木小学校)
- Shiroyama (城山小学校)
- Takakura (高倉小学校)
- Takane (高嶺小学校)
- Toyo (陶鎔小学校)
- Utsukidai (宇津木台小学校)
- Yamada (山田小学校)
- Yarimizu (鑓水小学校)
- Yokokawa (横川小学校)
- Yokoyama No. 1 (横山第一小学校)
- Yokoyama No. 2 (横山第二小学校)
- Yugi Chuo (由木中央小学校)
- Yugi Higashi (由木東小学校)
- Yugi Nishi (由木西小学校)
- Yui No. 1 (由井第一小学校)
- Yui No. 2 (由井第二小学校)
- Yui No. 3 (由井第三小学校)

Former:

- Takaosan Gakuen (高尾山学園) - Elementary and junior high

== Transportation ==
=== Railways ===
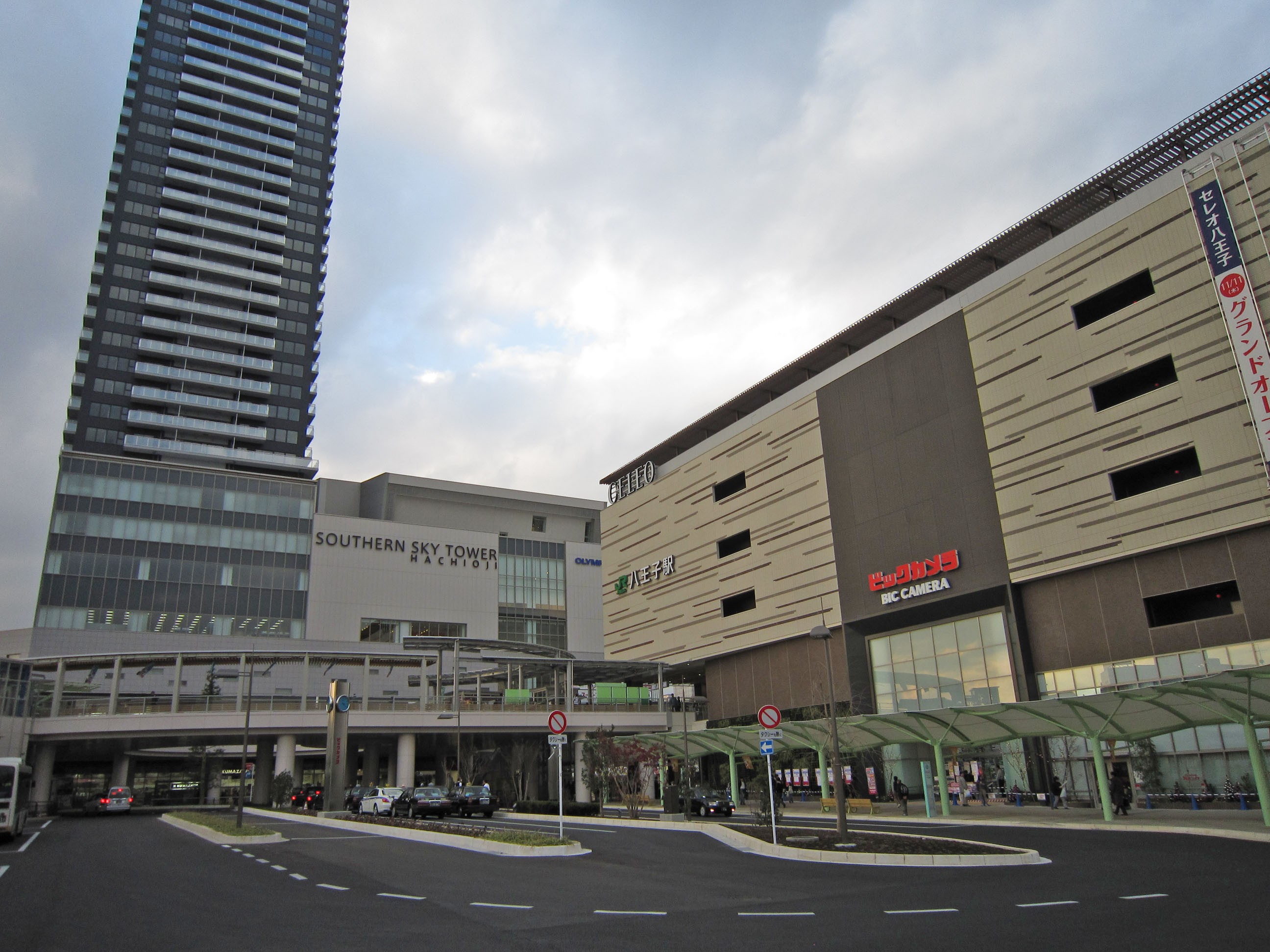
Hachiōji Station

JR East - Chūō Main Line

- Hachiōji – Nishi-Hachiōji – Takao

JR East - Yokohama Line

- Hachiōji-Minamino – Katakura – Hachiōji

JR East - Hachikō Line

- Hachiōji – Kita-Hachiōji – Komiya

Keio Corporation - Keiō Line

- Naganuma – Kitano – Keiō-Hachiōji

Keio Corporation - Keiō Takao Line

- Kitano – Keiō-Katakura – Yamada – Mejirodai – Hazama – Takao – Takaosanguchi

Keio Corporation - Sagamihara Line

- Keiō-Horinouchi – Minami-Ōsawa

Tokyo Tama Intercity Monorail - Tama Toshi Monorail Line

- Chūō-Daigaku-Meisei-Daigaku – Ōtsuka-Teikyō-Daigaku – Matsugaya
- Takaotozan Railway

=== Highways ===
- Ken-Ō Expressway
- Chūō Expressway
- National Route 16
- National Route 20
- National Route 411

== Sister cities ==
- Kaohsiung, Taiwan, friendship city since November 1, 2006
- Siheung, Gyeonggi Province, South Korea, friendship city since November 7, 2006
- Tai'an, Shandong, People's Republic of China, friendship city since September 23, 2006

== Local attractions ==
Hachioji stretches over a large area, combining such diverse parts as the densely populated city center and its shopping district with the hardly populated rural areas in the west.

- Mt. Takao (599 m) is a popular hiking destination in the southwest, easily accessible through the Keiō Takao Line. It is famous for the Shingon Buddhist temple Takao-san Yakuōin Yūkiji (高尾山薬王院有喜寺).
- Mt. Jinba (855 m) is more difficult to reach, requiring a one-hour bus ride from the city center. It is popular, however, because of the scenic view toward Mt. Fuji.
- Tama Forest Science Garden
- Tokyo Fuji Art Museum
- Kamiyugi Park Baseball Field
- Kamiyugi Park Athletic Stadium
- Musashi Imperial Graveyard houses the remains of the Taishō and Shōwa emperors.
- Takiyama Castle, A castle ruin in the Sengoku period, one of the Continued Top 100 Japanese Castles.
- Hachiōji Castle, A castle ruin in the Sengoku period, one of Japan's Top 100 Castles.
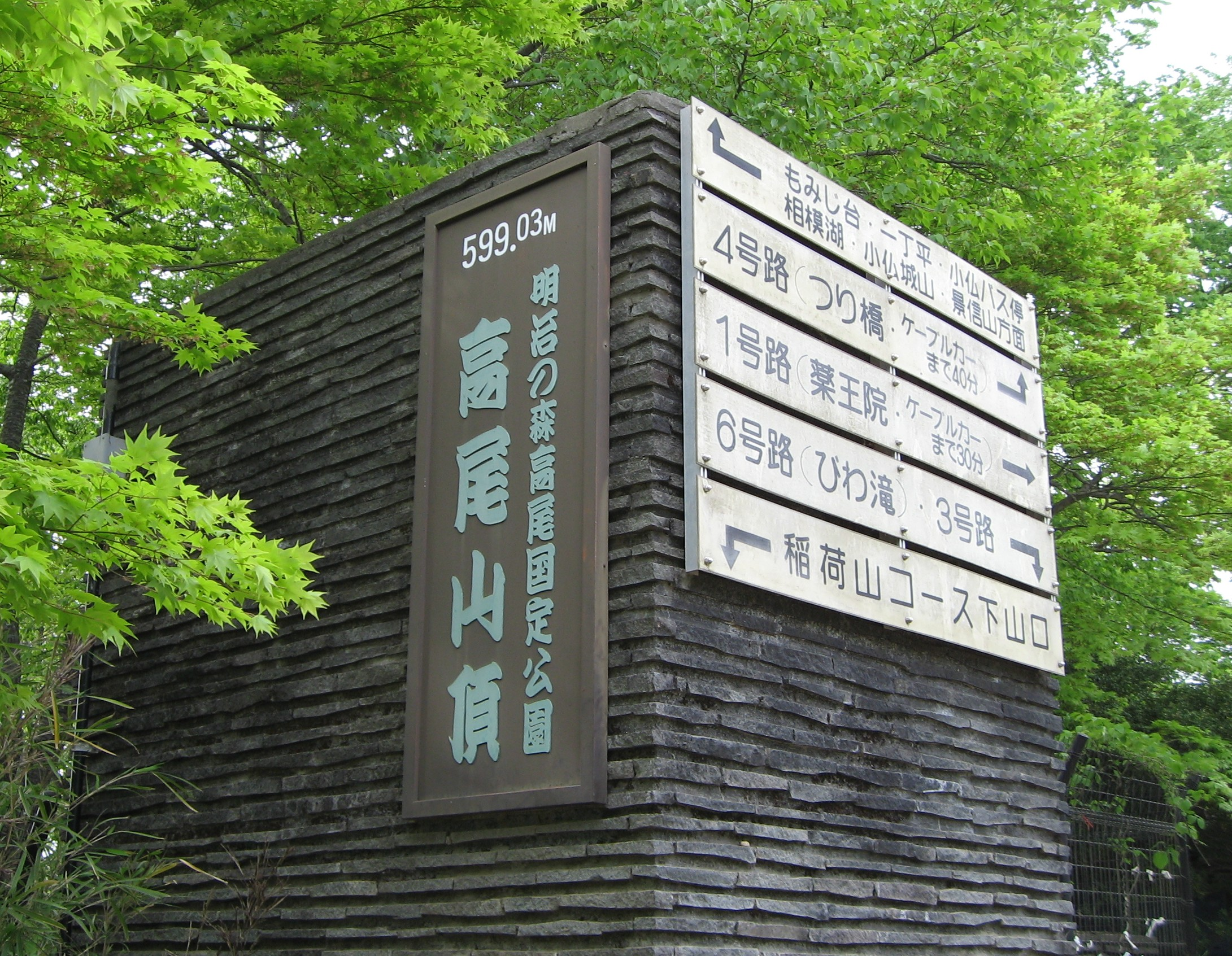
Mt. Takao

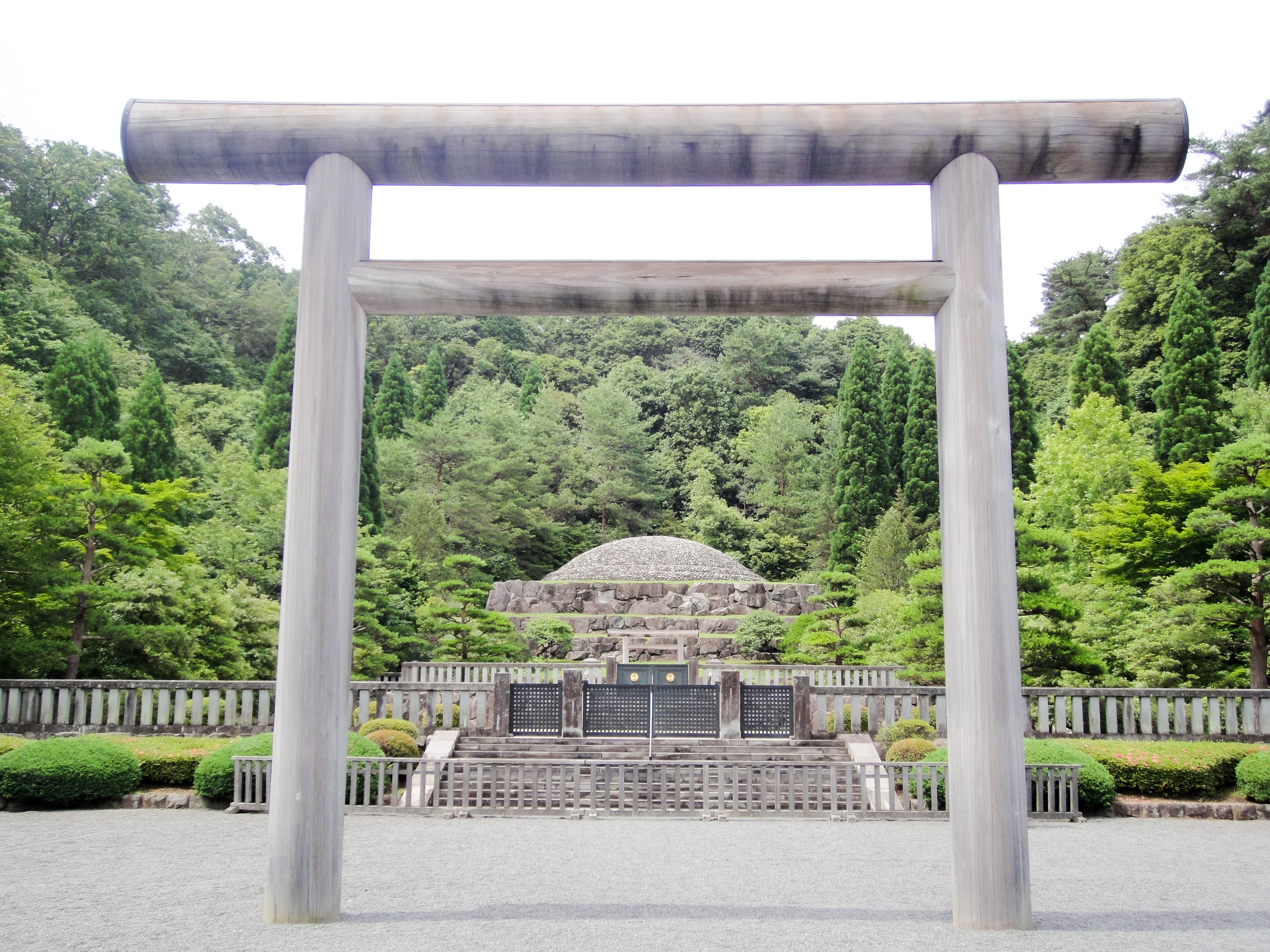
Shōwa emperor's grave

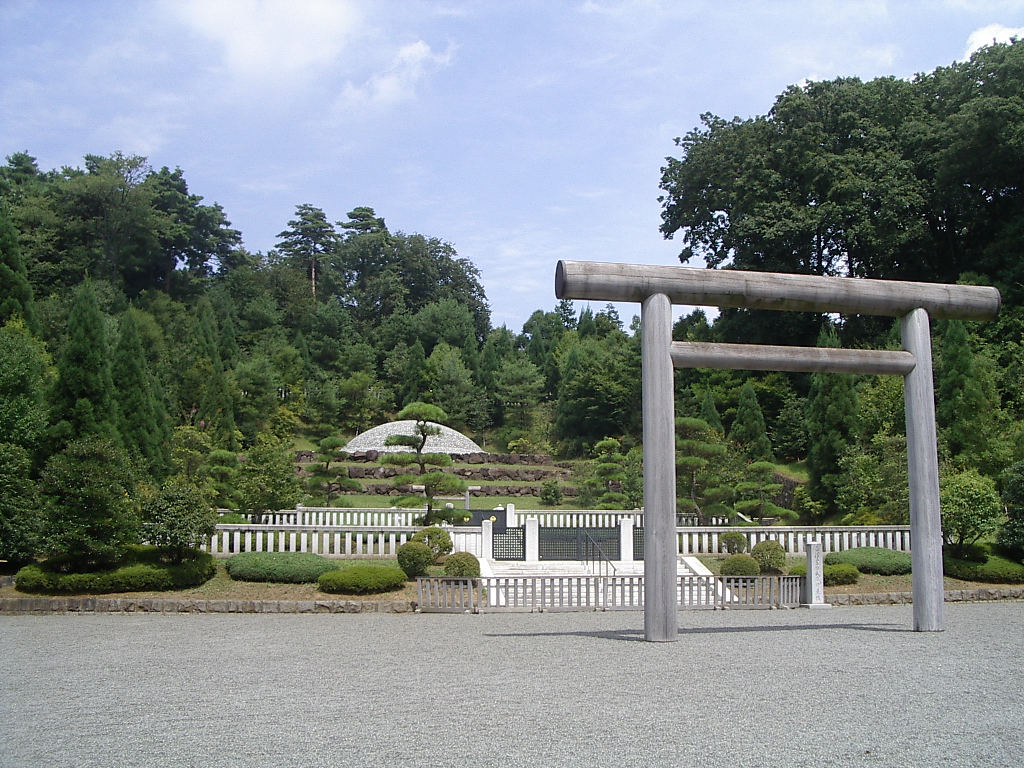
Taishō emperor's grave

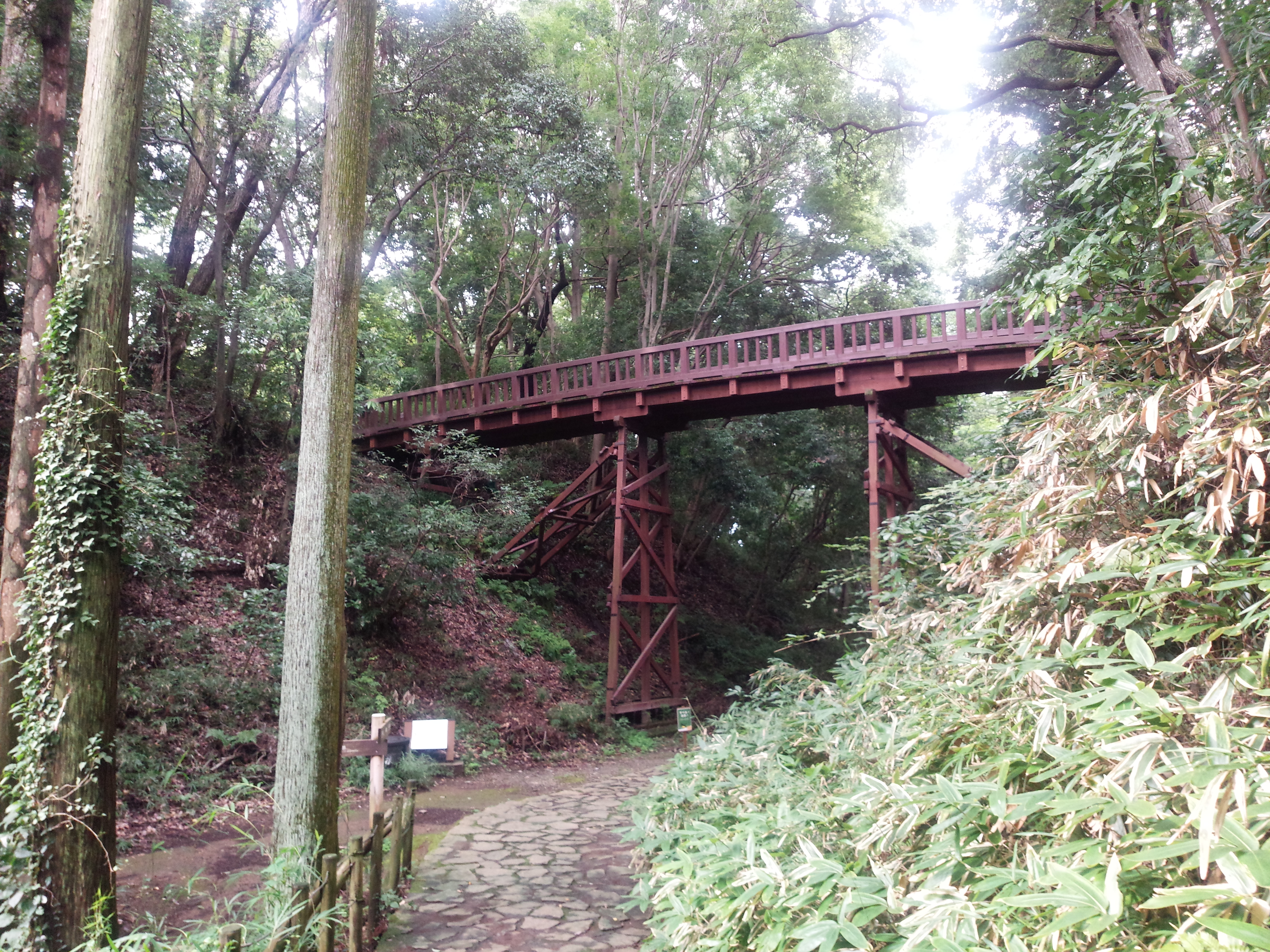
Reconstructed bridge of Takiyama Castle

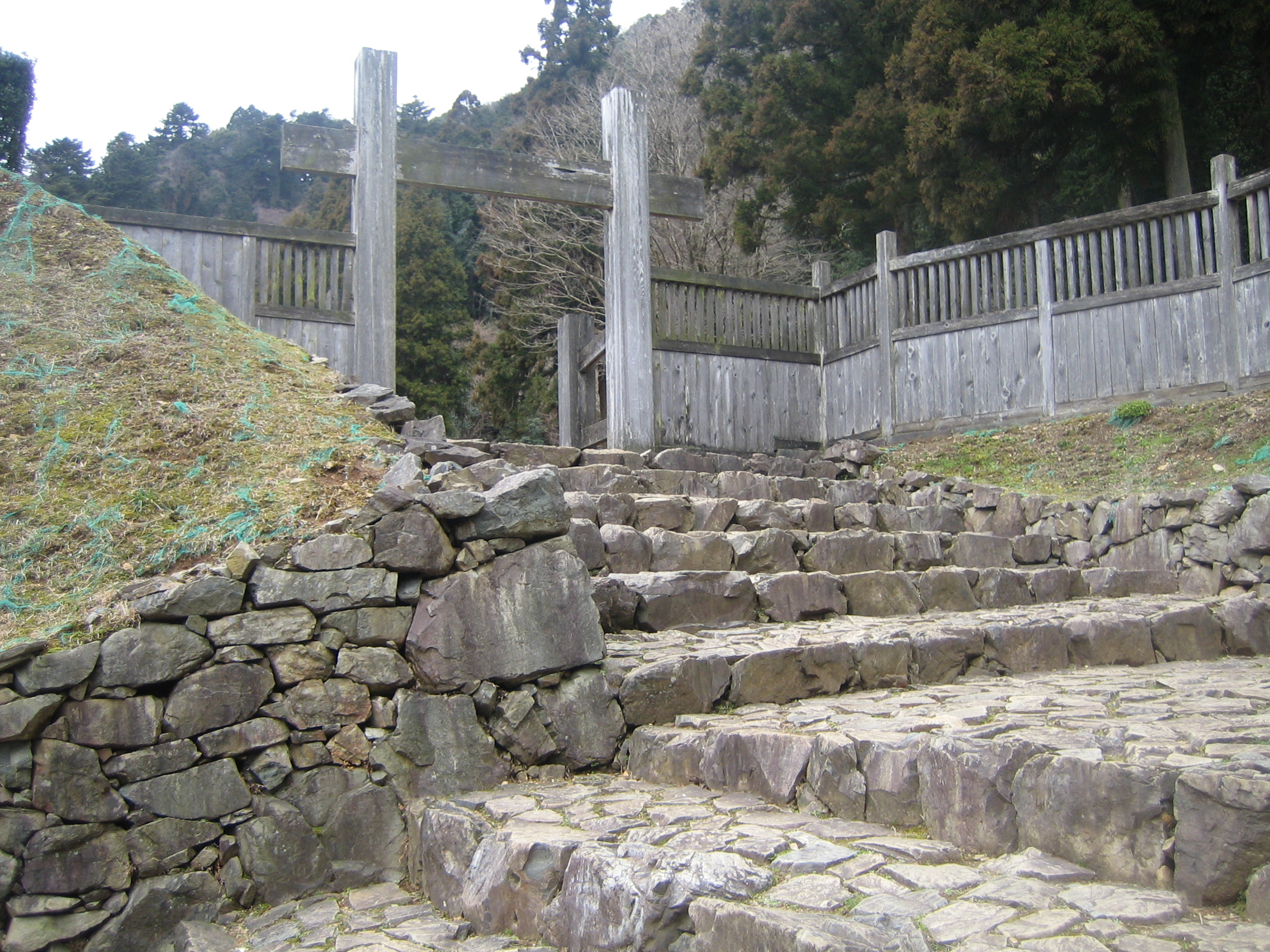
Stone wall and gate of Hachiōji Castle
