= Takao Station (Tokyo) =

Railway station in Hachiōji, Tokyo, Japan

Takao Station 高尾駅
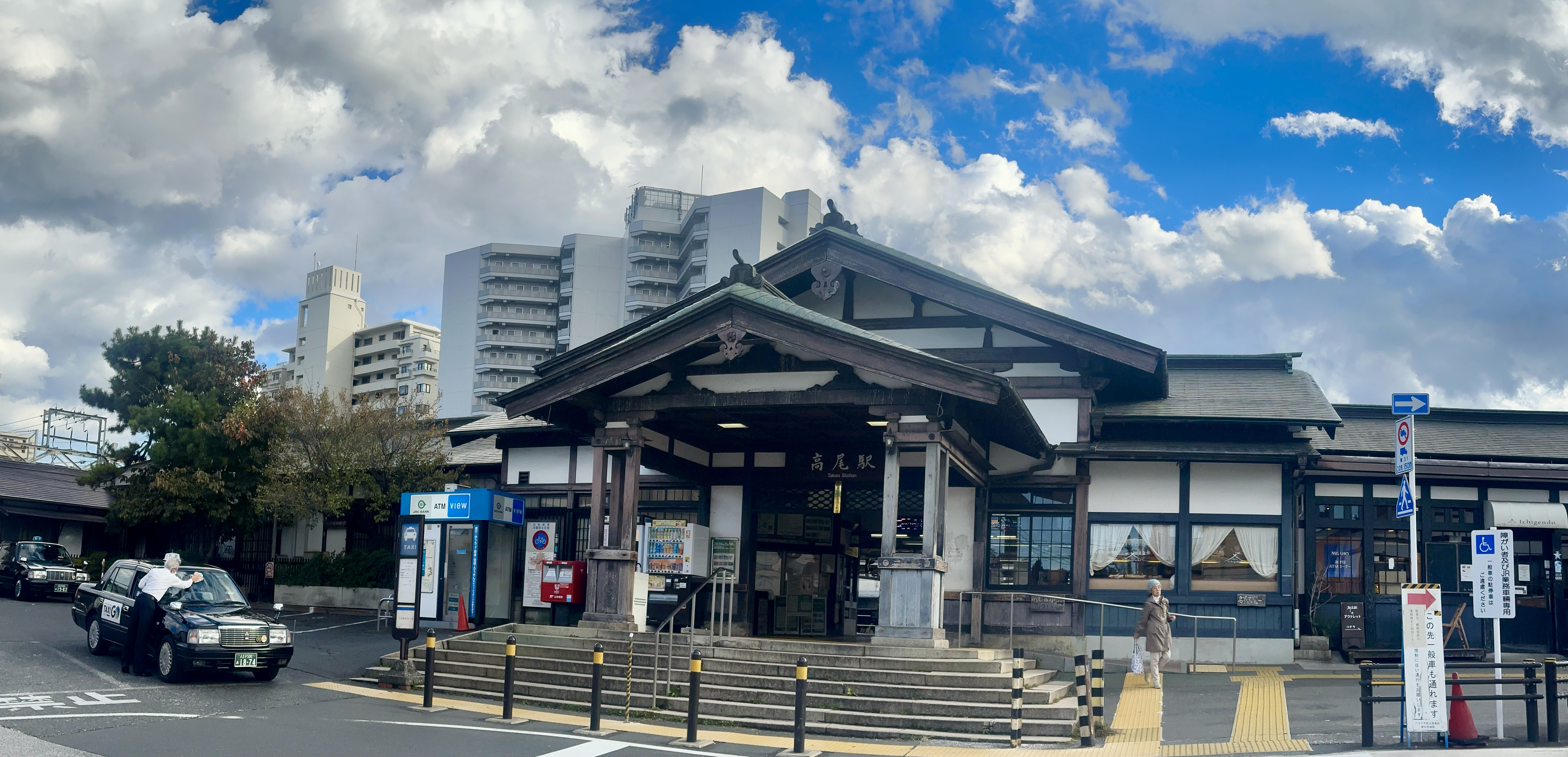
- The JR side of Takao Station in 2025

General information
- Location: Hachiōji City, Tokyo; Japan
- Coordinates: 35.642223°N 139.281814°E
- Operator: JR East; Keio Corporation
- Lines: ■ Chūō Main Line; Chūō Rapid Line; Keio Line
- Platforms: 3 island platforms
Location
- Location within Tokyo Location within Kanto Area Location within Japan

Takao Station (高尾駅, Takao-eki) is an interchange passenger railway station located in the city of Hachiōji, Tokyo, jointly operated by East Japan Railway Company (JR East) and the private railway operator Keio Corporation.

The station opened in 1901 as Asakawa Station and was renamed Takao Station in 1961.

== Lines ==
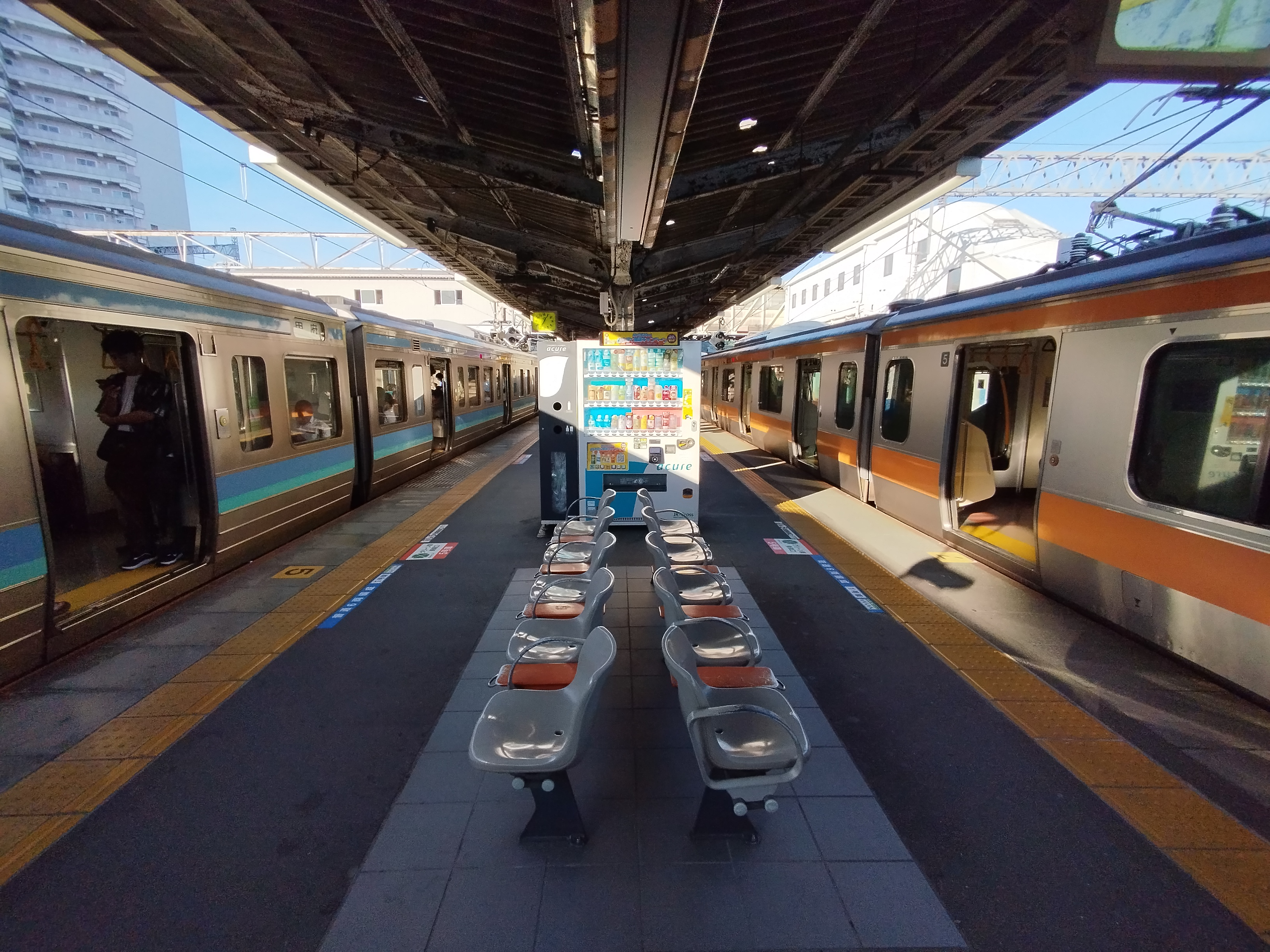
Takao station depicting cross platform interchange

Takao Station is served by the JR Chūō Main Line and is the last major station in Tokyo for the westbound Chūō Main Line. Therefore, it is a terminating station for many local and rapid trains on the line. The station is 53.1 kilometers from Tokyo Station. It is also served by the Keio Takao Line and is 6.9 kilometers from the terminus of that line at Kitano, and 43.0 kilometers from Shinjuku Station.

== Station layout ==
The JR East station has two island platforms serving four tracks. The station has a Midori no Madoguchi staffed ticket office.

JC24 Takao Station 高尾駅
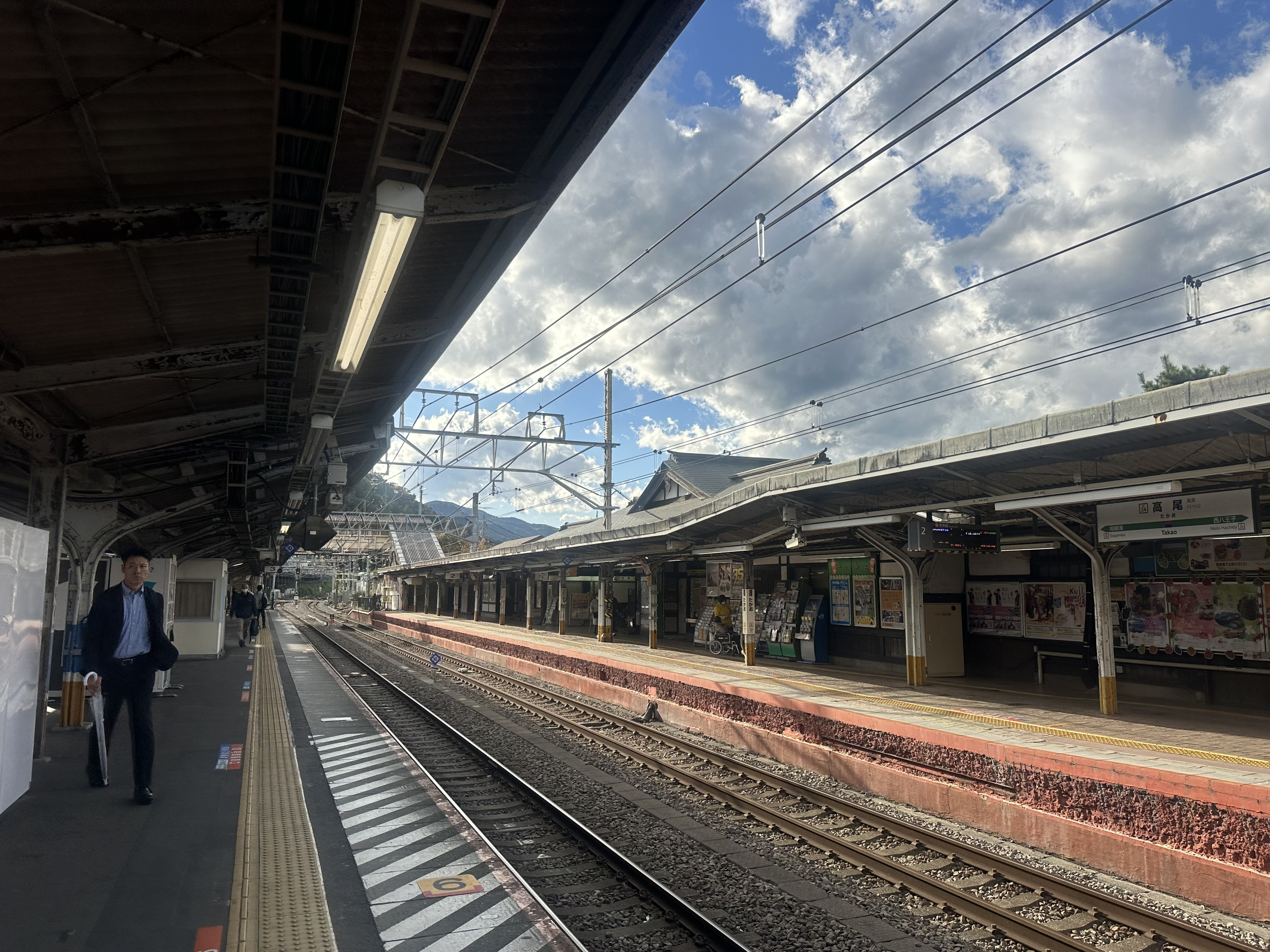
- JR Takao Station platforms, November 2025

General information
- Location: 1201-2 Takao-machi, Hachiōji City, Tokyo; Japan
- Operator: JR East
- Lines: Chūō Main Line; Chūō Rapid Line
- Distance: 53.1 km (33.0 mi) from Tokyo; 42.8 km (26.6 mi) from Shinjuku
- Platforms: 2 island platforms
- Tracks: 4

Construction
- Structure type: At grade

Other information
- Status: Staffed (Midori no Madoguchi)
- Website: Official website

History
- Opened: 1 August 1901; 125 years ago

Passengers
- FY2024: 51,084 (daily) ▲2.55%

Services
Preceding station	JR East	Following station
Sagamiko One-way operation	Chūō Line Commuter Special Rapid	Hachioji JC22 towards Tokyo
Sagamiko JC25 towards Ōtsuki	Chūō Line Chūō Special Rapid	Nishi-Hachioji JC23 towards Tokyo
Sagamiko JC25 towards Ōtsuki	Chūō Line Commuter Rapid	Nishi-Hachioji One-way operation
Sagamiko JC25 towards Ōtsuki	Chūō Line Rapid	Nishi-Hachioji JC23 towards Tokyo
Sagamiko JC25 towards Shiojiri	Chūō Main Line Local	Nishi-Hachiōji JC23 towards Tachikawa
Location

=== JR East platforms ===
1	Chūō Line (Rapid)	for Hachiōji, Tachikawa, Shinjuku, and Tokyo
1	■ Narita Express	for Mitaka, Shinjuku, Tokyo, Narita Airport
2-4	Chuo Line (Rapid)	for Hachiōji, Tachikawa, Shinjuku, and Tokyo
2-4	■ Chūō Main Line	for Ōtsuki, Kōfu, and Kobuchizawa

=== Keio platforms ===
Takao Station 高尾駅

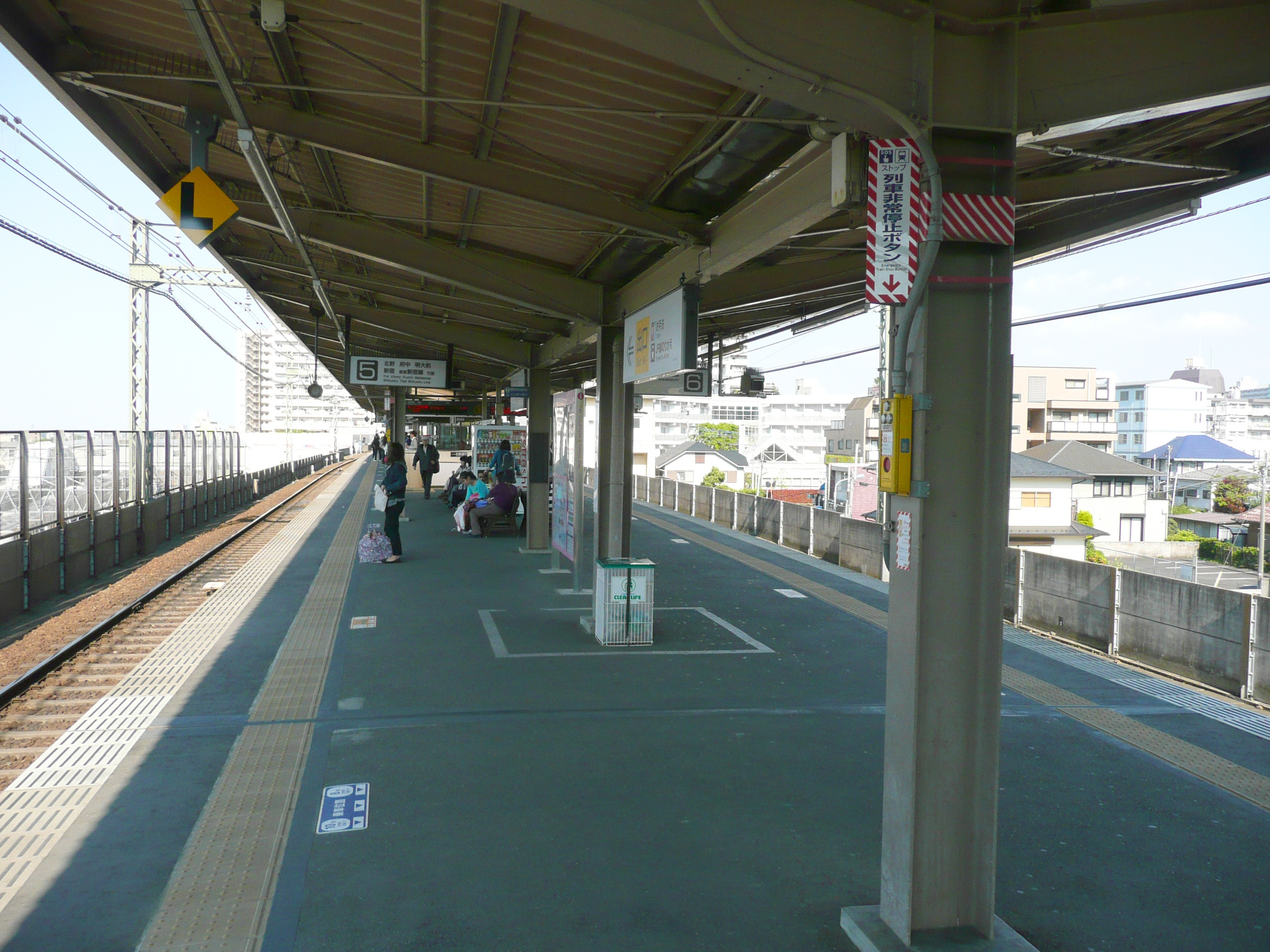
- The Keio platforms in April 2013

General information
- Location: 1227-3 Hatsusawa-machi, Hachiōji City, Tokyo; Japan
- System: Keio station
- Operator: Keio Corporation
- Line: Keio Line
- Distance: 43.0 km from Shinjuku
- Platforms: 1 island platform

History
- Opened: 1 October 1967

Passengers
- FY2024: 23,252 (daily) ▼0.08%

Services
Preceding station	Keio Corporation	Following station
Takaosanguchi One-way operation	Keiō Line Mt Takao	Mejirodai towards Shinjuku
Takaosanguchi Terminus	Takao Line Special Express Express	Mejirodai towards Kitano
Takaosanguchi Terminus	Takao Line Semi Express Rapid Local	Hazama towards Kitano
Location

The Keio Takao Line is served by a single elevated island platform, serving two tracks.

5	Keiō Takao Line	for Kitano; Keiō Line for Chōfu and Shinjuku; Toei Shinjuku Line for Motoyawata
6	Keiō Takao Line	for Takaosanguchi

== History ==
The JR East station opened on 1 August 1901. The Keio station opened on 1 October 1967. With the privatization of Japanese National Railways (JNR) on 1 April 1987, the station came under the control of JR East.

== Passenger statistics ==
In fiscal 2019, the JR station was used by an average of 28,214 passengers daily (boarding passengers only). In the same year, the Keio station was used by an average of 26,683 passengers daily.

The passenger figures (boarding passengers only) for previous years are as shown below.

Fiscal year	JR daily average	Keio daily average
2005	32,388	26,677
2010	30,517	27,585
2015	29,110	27,414

== See also ==
- List of railway stations in Japan
