= Keiō Takao Line =

Japanese Railway Line

Takao Line

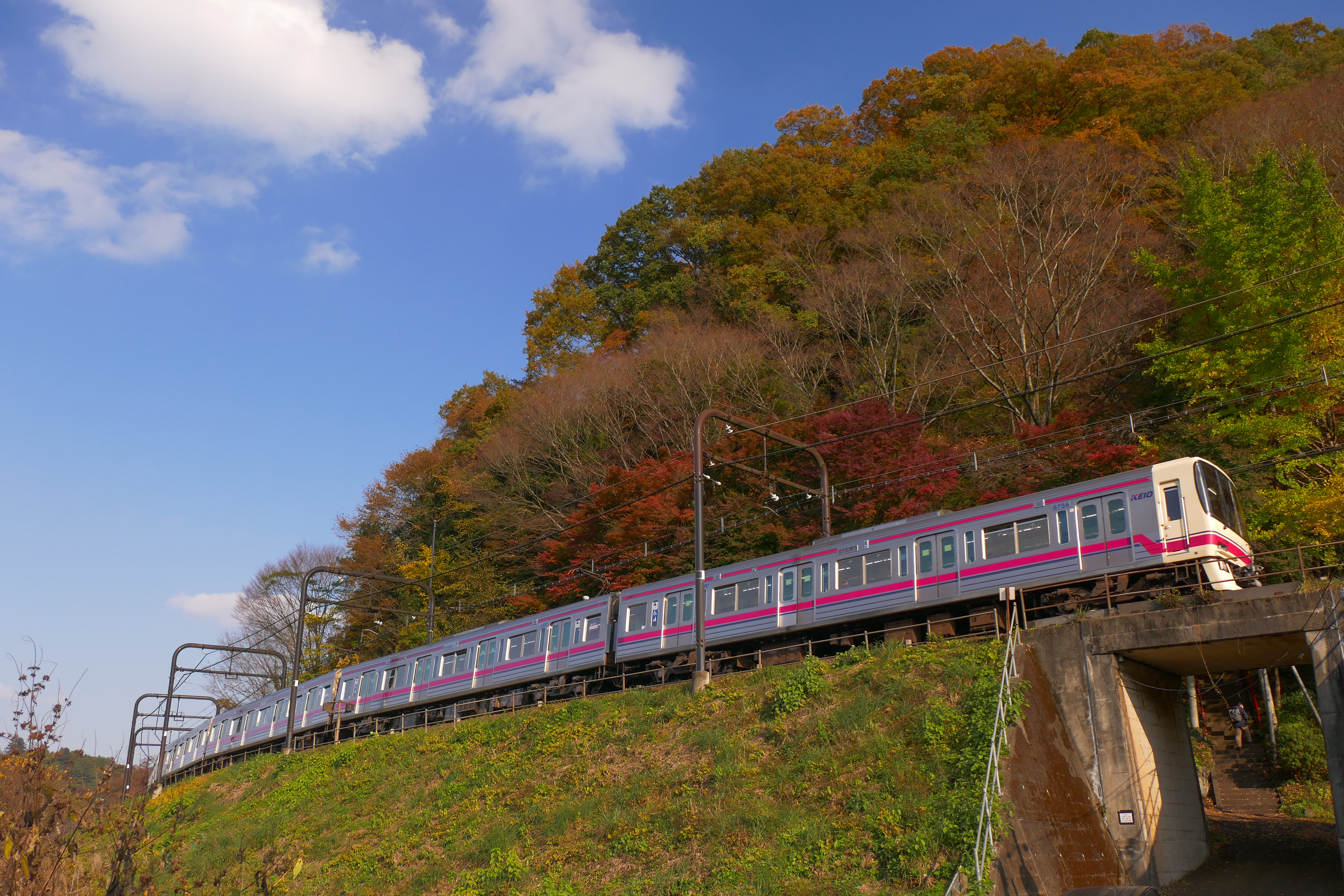
- An 8000 series EMU train on the Takao Line in November 2021

Overview
- Native name: 高尾線
- Status: In service
- Owner: Keio Corporation
- Line number: KO
- Locale: Tokyo
- Termini: Kitano; Takaosanguchi
- Stations: 7

Service
- Type: Commuter rail
- System: Keio Electric Railway
- Operator(s): Keio Corporation
- Rolling stock: Keio 5000 series Keio 7000 series Keio 8000 series Keio 9000 series

History
- Opened: 1 October 1967; 58 years ago

Technical
- Line length: 8.6 km (5.3 mi)
- Track gauge: 1,372 mm (4 ft 6 in)
- Minimum radius: 200 m (660 ft)
- Electrification: 1,500 V DC (overhead catenary)
- Operating speed: 105 km/h (65 mph)
- Train protection system: Keio ATC
- Maximum incline: 3.5%

The Takao Line (高尾線, Takao-sen) is a railway line operated by the Japanese private railway operator Keio Corporation. The line connects Kitano Station on the Keio Line, to Takaosanguchi Station, and offers access to Mount Takao at the terminal. It is 1,372 mm (4 ft 6 in) gauge, electrified at 1,500 V DC. The line originally terminated at Goryōmae to service visitors to the Musashi Imperial Graveyard.

During the daytime, most trains operate through to/from the Shinjuku terminal on the Keio Line.

== Service patterns ==
On the Takao Line, Keio operates six different service types, with trains running through to and from the Keio Main Line.

- Local (各駅停車, Kakueki Teisha) (L)
- Rapid (快速, Kaisoku) (R)
- Semi Express (区間急行, Kukan Kyūkō) (SeE)
- Express (急行, Kyūkō) (E)
- Special Express (特急, Tokkyū) (SpE)
- Mt.TAKAO (MT) - Reserved-seat supplementary-fare services to and from Shinjuku, operating on weekends and holidays with three round-trips.

== Stations ==
All stations are in Hachiōji, Tokyo.

Legend

● : All trains stop
▲ : Shinjuku-bound trains stop to pick up passengers
│ : All trains pass

No.	Station	Japanese	Distance (km) (from Kitano)	Distance (km) (from Shinjuku)	L	R	SeE	E	SpE	MT	Transfers
↑ Through-running to/from the Keiō Line towards Shinjuku ↑
	Kitano	北野	0.0	36.1	●	●	●	●	●	▲	Keiō Line (KO33)
	Keiō-Katakura	京王片倉	1.7	37.8	●	●	●	｜	●	｜	Yokohama Line (Katakura: JH31)
	Yamada	山田	3.2	39.3	●	●	●	｜	●	｜	
	Mejirodai	めじろ台	4.3	40.4	●	●	●	●	●	▲	
	Hazama	狭間	5.8	41.9	●	●	●	｜	●	｜	
	Takao	高尾	6.9	43.0	●	●	●	●	●	▲	Chūō Line (JC24)
	Takaosanguchi	高尾山口	8.6	44.7	●	●	●	●	●	●	

== History ==
=== Former Goryō Line ===
On March 20, 1930, the Keio Electric Tramway opened the Goryō Line, a 6.3 km branch of the Keio Line, electrified at 600 V DC, between Kitano Station and Goryōmae Station. The terminus, Goryōmae, was a gateway for the tomb of Emperor Taishō.

The line had three intermediate stations: Katakura, Yamada, and Yokoyama. Yokoyama Station and Goryōmae Station were renamed Musashi-Yokoyama Station and Tamagoryōmae Station respectively in 1937. The line was single track and had a passing loop at Yokoyama Station. On weekdays, the line operated at 30 or 40 minute intervals, while at weekends it operated through trains to Yotsuya-Shinjuku Station, the Tokyo terminal of Keio at that time, at 20-minute intervals.

The Keio Electric Tramway was merged into Tokyō Kyūko Dentetsu (present-day Tokyu Corporation) in 1944. The new operator suspended operation of the Goryō Line on January 21, 1945, as a "not needed or not pressing" line, which was subject of the collection of metal for the war effort.

In 1948, Keio Teito Electric Railway (present-day Keio Corporation) was established and succeeded the former operation of Keiō Electric Tramway including the suspended Goryō Line.

=== Takao Line ===
During the economic boom in the 1960s, Keio decided to build a new line to Mount Takao, utilizing a part of the (effectively closed) Goryō Line. Keio opened the Takao Line on October 1, 1967, electrified at 1,500 V DC and dual track to Takao station. Of the former Goryō Line stations, Katakura Station (newly named Keiō-Katakura Station) and Yamada Station were revived.
