= Fuchinobe Station =

Railway station in Sagamihara, Kanagawa Prefecture, Japan

JH25 Fuchinobe Station 淵野辺駅
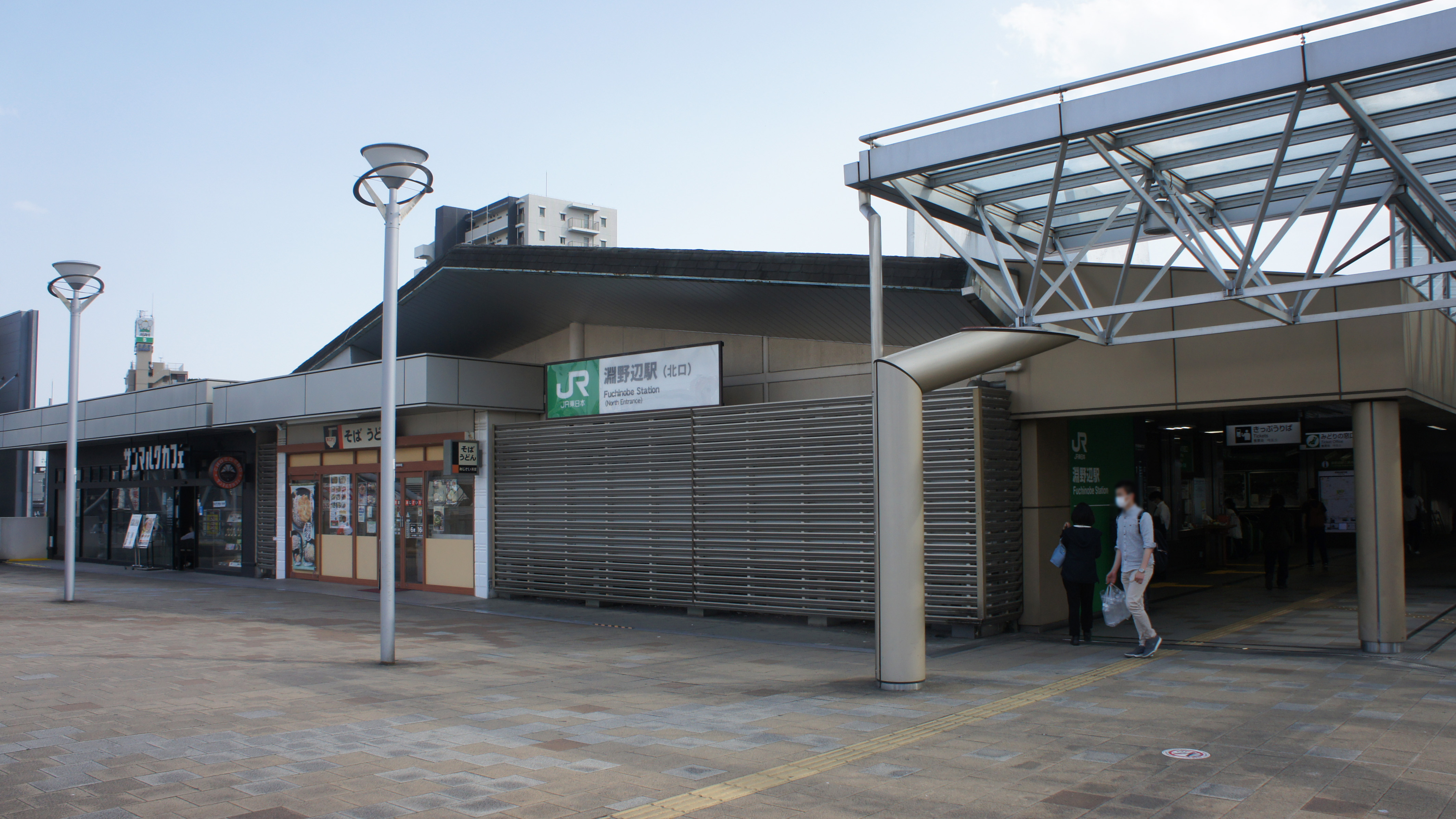
- Fuchinobe Station north exit, May 2021

General information
- Location: Fuchinobe 3-5-16, Chūō-ku, Sagamihara-shi, Kanagawa-ken 252-0206; Japan
- Coordinates: 35°34′7.17″N 139°23′42.2″E
- Operator: JR East
- Line: ■ Yokohama Line
- Distance: 28.4 km from Higashi-Kanagawa
- Platforms: 1 island platform
- Connections: Bus stop

Other information
- Status: Staffed
- Station code: JH25
- Website: Official website

History
- Opened: 23 September 1908

Passengers
- FY2019: 38,106 daily (boarding passengers)

Services
| Preceding station | JR East | Following station |
|---|---|---|
| Yabe JH26 towards Hachiōji | Yokohama Line Local | Kobuchi JH24 towards Higashi-Kanagawa or Ōfuna |
Location
- Location within Kanagawa Prefecture Location within Japan

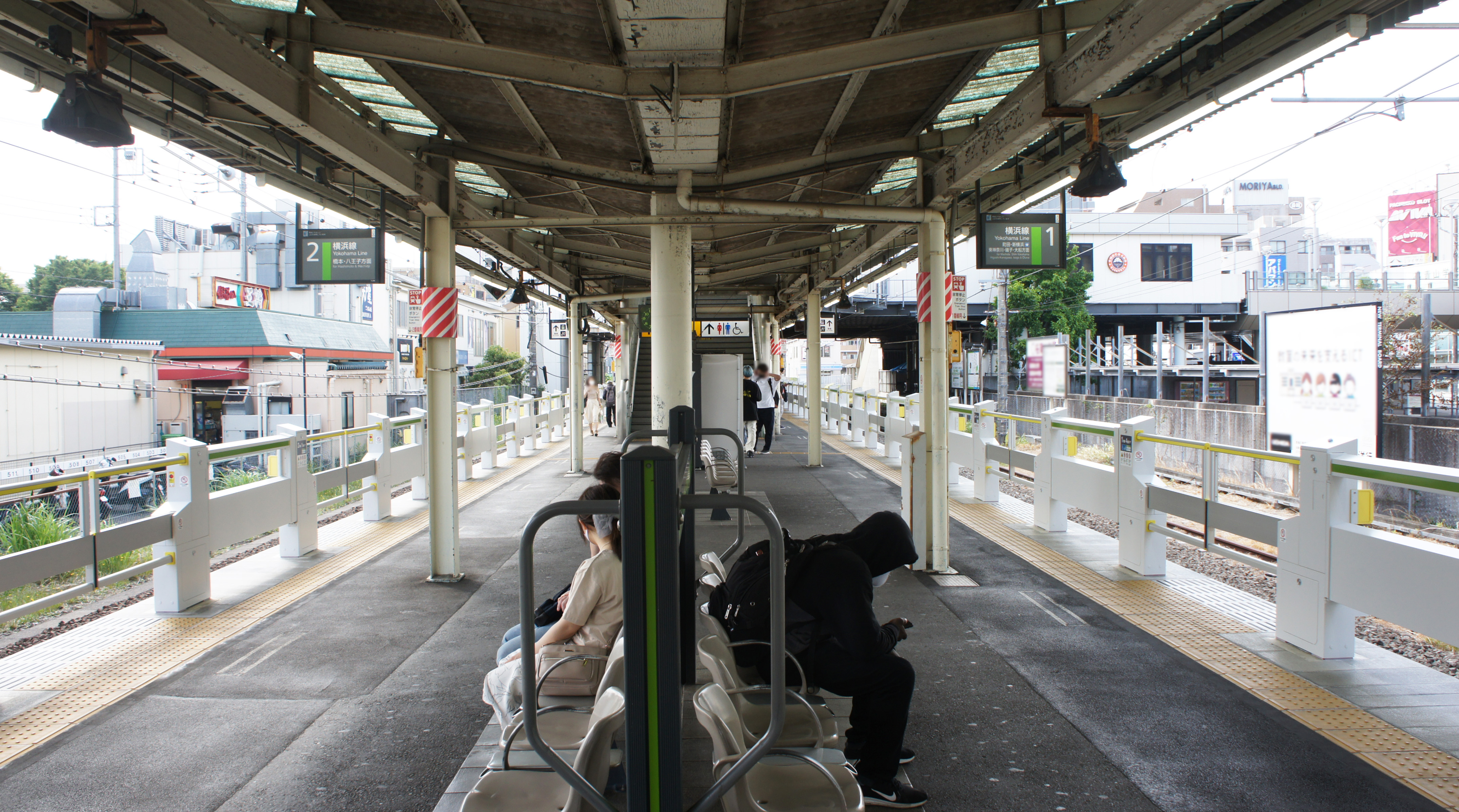
Platform

Fuchinobe Station (淵野辺駅, Fuchinobe-eki) is a passenger railway station located in Chūō-ku in the city of Sagamihara, Kanagawa Prefecture, Japan, and is operated by the East Japan Railway Company (JR East).

== Lines ==
Fuchinobe Station is served by the Yokohama Line, and is located 28.4 kilometers from the terminus of the line at Higashi-Kanagawa.

== Station layout ==
Fuchinobe Station is an elevated station with a single island platform serving two tracks.

=== Platforms ===
| 1 | Yokohama Line | for Machida, Higashi-Kanagawa, Yokohama, Sakuragichō and Ōfuna |
| 2 | Yokohama Line | for Sagamihara, Hashimoto, and Hachiōji |

== History ==
Fuchinobe Station was opened on 23 September 1908 on the Yokohama Railway. The Yokohama Railway was nationalized on 1 April 1910 and became part of the Japanese Government Railway (JGR) in 1917. The JGR became the Japan National Railway (JNR) after World War II. All freight operations were discontinued from 1 October 1977. With the privatization of the JNR on 1 April 1987, the station came under the operational control of JR East.

Station numbering was introduced on 20 August 2016 with Fuchinobe being assigned station number JH25.

== Passenger statistics ==
In fiscal 2019, the station was used by an average of 38,106 passengers daily (boarding passengers only).

The passenger figures (boarding passengers only) for previous years are as shown below.

| Fiscal year | daily average |
|---|---|
| 2005 | 36,111 |
| 2010 | 39,800 |
| 2015 | 38,034 |

== Surrounding area ==
- Aoyama Gakuin University
- Obirin University
- Sagamihara City Library
- Kanuma Park
- Yaoko

== See also ==
- List of railway stations in Japan
