= Machida, Tokyo =

Machida 町田市
- City
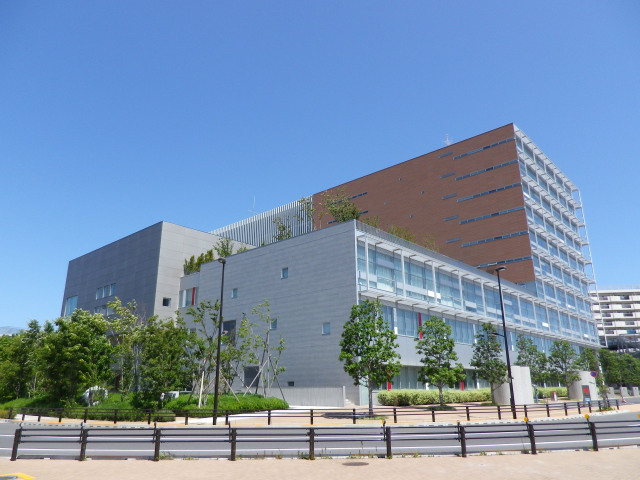
- Machida City Hall

- Flag Seal

- Location of Machida in Tokyo

- Coordinates: 35°33′15″N 139°26′35″E
- Country: Japan
- Region: Kantō
- Prefecture: Tokyo
- Town settled: April 1, 1913
- City settled: February 1, 1958

Government
  - Mayor: Kōji Inagaki (ja:稲垣康治) - from March 2026

Area
  - Total: 71.80 km^{2} (27.72 sq mi)

Population (April 2021)
  - Total: 428,851
  - Density: 5,973/km^{2} (15,470/sq mi)
- Time zone: UTC+9 (Japan Standard Time)
- Symbols
  - Tree: Zelkova serrata
  - Flower: Scarlet sage
  - Bird: Common kingfisher
- Phone number: 042-722-3111
- Address: 1-20-23 Nakamachi, Machida-shi, Tokyo 194-8520
- Website: Official website

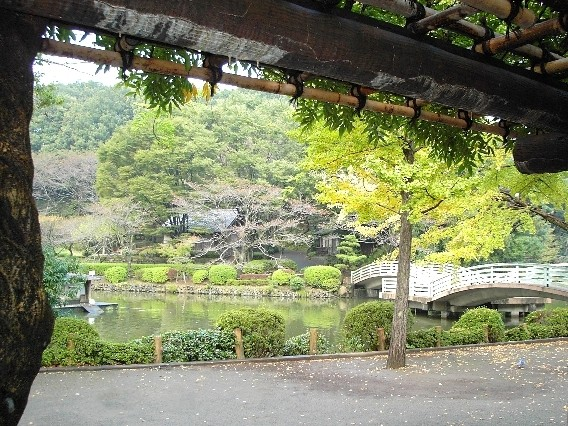
One of the ponds of Yakushi-Ike Park in Machida

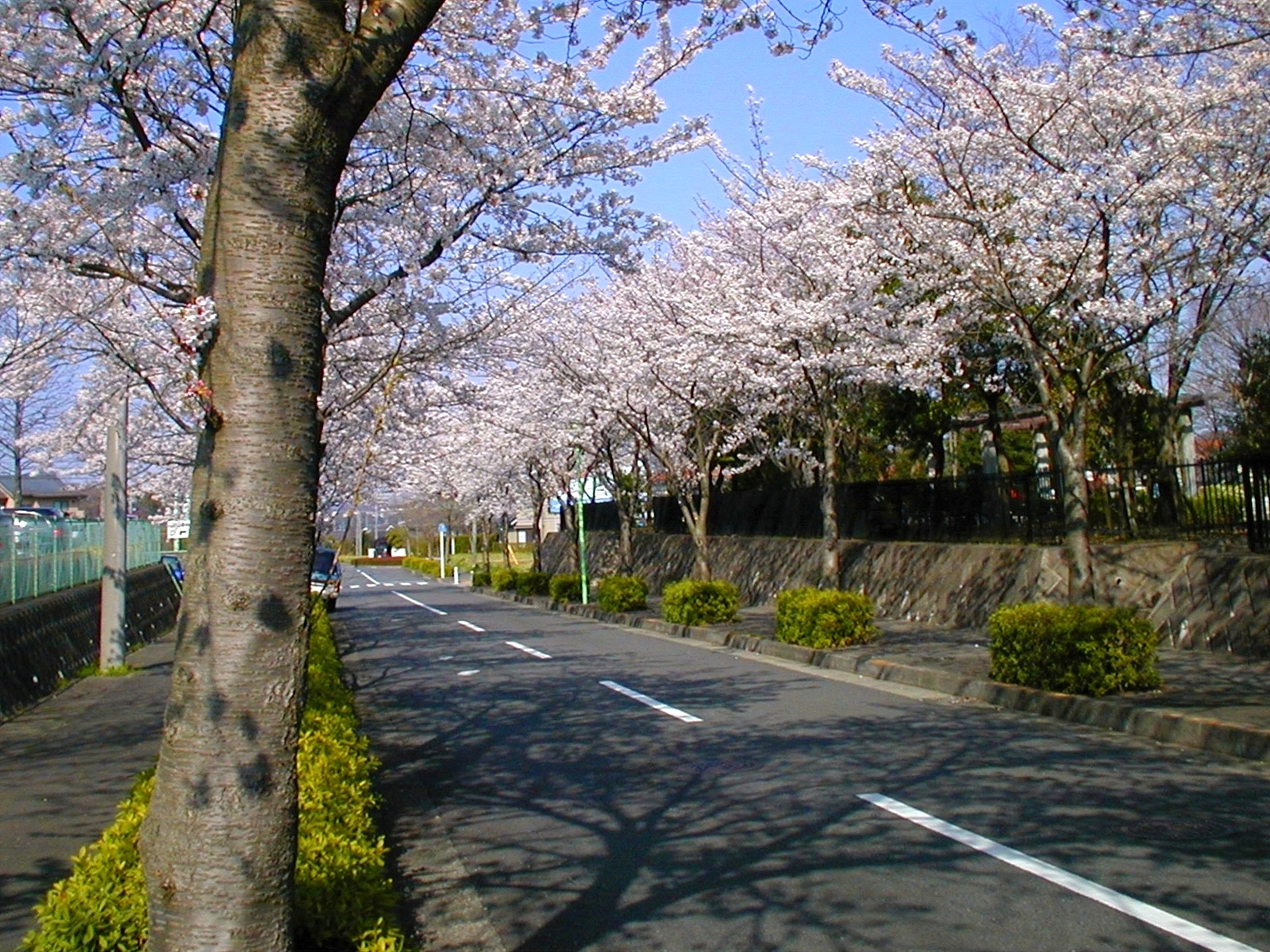
A road lined with cherry blossom trees in Machida

Machida (町田市, Machida-shi) is a city located in the western portion of the Tokyo Metropolis, Japan. As of 1 April 2021, the city had an estimated population of 428,851, and a population density of 6,000 persons per km^{2}. The total area of the city was 71.80 square kilometres (27.72 sq mi).

Due to geographical and other reasons, Machida is often regarded as having more connection to Kanagawa Prefecture than to Tokyo Metropolis, to which it administratively belongs.

== Geography ==
Machida is located in the Tama Hills of southern Tokyo Metropolis, bordered by Kanagawa Prefecture on the west, south, and east approximately 40 to 50 kilometers from the center of Tokyo. The highest point is Mount Kusato (elevation 364 meters) at the western end. There are few flatlands near Machida Station, the Sakai River flows to the west and south, and the Tsurumi River flows almost in the center of the city.

=== Surrounding municipalities ===
Kanagawa Prefecture

- Kawasaki
- Sagamihara
- Yamato
- Yokohama

Tokyo Metropolis

- Hachiōji
- Tama

=== Climate ===
Machida has a humid subtropical climate (Köppen Cfa) characterized by warm summers and cool winters with light to no snowfall. The average annual temperature in Machida is 14.0 °C. The average annual rainfall is 1621 mm with September as the wettest month. The temperatures are highest on average in August, at around 25.3 °C, and lowest in January, at around 2.8 °C.

== Demographics ==
Per Japanese census data, the population of Machida has seen consistent but uneven growth over the past century.

Historical population
Year	Pop.	±%
1920	23,620	—
1930	26,669	+12.9%
1940	32,020	+20.1%
1950	52,486	+63.9%
1960	71,269	+35.8%
1970	202,499	+184.1%
1980	295,405	+45.9%
1990	349,050	+18.2%
2000	377,494	+8.1%
2010	427,016	+13.1%
2020	431,079	+1.0%

== History ==
The area of present-day Machida was part of ancient Musashi Province. In the post-Meiji Restoration cadastral reform of July 22, 1878, the area became part of Minamitama District in Kanagawa Prefecture. The village of Machida was created on April 1, 1889, with the establishment of modern municipalities system. Minamitama District was transferred to the administrative control of Tokyo Metropolis on April 1, 1893. Tama was elevated to town status on April 1, 1913. The town was bombed by American forces on May 24, 1945, during World War II.

Machida expanded through annexation of the neighboring village of Minami on April 1, 1954, followed by the villages of Tsurukawa, Tadao and Sakai on February 1, 1958, to become the city of Machida. A USMC RF-8A crashed in a residential area Machida on April 1, 1964, killing four people. From 1973, the Tama New Town development resulted in a rapid increase in population, turning the city into a bedroom community for Tokyo and Yokohama.

== Government ==
Machida has a mayor-council form of government with a directly elected mayor and a unicameral city council of 36 members, whose members are elected for a four-year term. Machida contributes four members to the Tokyo Metropolitan Assembly. In terms of national politics, the city is part of Tokyo 23rd district of the lower house of the Diet of Japan.

=== Mayors ===
1. Tokichiro Aoyama (1958–1970, 3 terms)
2. Katsumasa Oshita (1970–1990, 5 terms)
3. Kazuo Terada (1990–2006, 4 terms)
4. Joichi Ishizaka (2006–present, 4th term incumbent)

== Education ==
=== Universities and colleges ===
- J. F. Oberlin University
- Kokushikan University
- Showa Pharmaceutical University
- Tamagawa University
- Tokyo Kasei-Gakuin University
- Tokyo Jogakkan College
- Hosei University - Machida campus
- Wako University
- Tsurukawa Women's Junior College

=== Primary and secondary education ===
Machida has seven public high schools operated by the Tokyo Metropolitan Government Board of Education, including:

- Machida High School
- Machida Sogo High School
- Machida Technical High School
- Naruse High School
- Nozuta High School
- Ogawa High School
- Yamazaki High School

The Machida city government operates 20 public junior high schools and 42 elementary schools.

Combined municipal elementary and junior high schools:

- Yukinoki Gakuen (ゆくのき学園) - For elementary, it occupies Oto Elementary (大戸小学校). For junior high, it occupies Musashigaoka Junior High School (武蔵岡中学校)

Municipal junior high schools:

- Kanai (金井中学校)
- Kiso (木曽中学校)
- Machida No. 1 (町田第一中学校)
- Machida No. 2 (町田第二中学校)
- Machida No. 3 (町田第三中学校)
- Minami (南中学校)
- Minaminaruse (南成瀬中学校)
- Minamiotani (南大谷中学校)
- Narusedai (成瀬台中学校)
- Oyama (小山中学校)
- Oyamada (小山田中学校)
- Sakai (堺中学校)
- Shinkoji (真光寺中学校)
- Tadao (忠生中学校)
- Tsukushino (つくし野中学校)
- Tsurukawa (鶴川中学校)
- Tsurukawa No. 2 (鶴川第二中学校)
- Yakushi (薬師中学校)
- Yamasaki (山崎中学校)

Municipal elementary schools:

- Aihara (相原小学校)
- Fujinodai (藤の台小学校)
- Honmachida (本町田小学校)
- Honmachida Higashi (本町田東小学校)
- Kanai (金井小学校)
- Kiso Sakaigawa (木曽境川小学校)
- Kogasaka (高ヶ坂小学校)
- Machida No. 1 (町田第一小学校)
- Machida No. 2 (町田第二小学校)
- Machida No. 3 (町田第三小学校)
- Machida No. 4 (町田第四小学校)
- Machida No. 5 (町田第五小学校)
- Machida No. 6 (町田第六小学校)
- Minami No. 1 (南第一小学校)
- Minami No. 2 (南第二小学校)
- Minami No. 3 (南第三小学校)
- Minami No. 4 (南第四小学校)
- Minaminaruse (南成瀬小学校)
- Minamioya (南大谷小学校)
- Minami Tsukushino (南つくし野小学校)
- Miwa (三輪小学校)
- Nanakuniyama (七国山小学校)
- Naruse Chuo (成瀬中央小学校)
- Narusedai (成瀬台小学校)
- Ogawa (小川小学校)
- Okura (大蔵小学校)
- Oyama (小山小学校)
- Oyama Chuo (小山中央小学校)
- Oyamada (小山田小学校)
- Oyamada Minami (小山田南小学校)
- Oyama Gaoka (小山ヶ丘小学校)
- Tadao (忠生小学校)
- Tadao No. 3 (忠生第三小学校)
- Takagasaka (高ヶ坂小学校)
- Tsukushino (つくし野小学校)
- Tsurukawa No. 1 (鶴川第一小学校)
- Tsurukawa No. 2 (鶴川第二小学校)
- Tsurukawa No. 3 (鶴川第三小学校)
- Tsurukawa No. 4 (鶴川第四小学校)
- Tsuruma (鶴間小学校)
- Yamazaki (山崎小学校)
- Zushi (図師小学校)

The city also operates one special education school for the handicapped.

There are also seven private high schools, including:

- Tamagawa Gakuen
- Third Junior & Senior High School of Nihon University

There are also five private junior high schools and three private elementary schools.

International schools

- West Tokyo Korean 2nd Elementary School - North Korean school

== Transportation ==
=== Railway ===
Odakyu Electric Railway - Odakyu Odawara Line

- Machida - Tamagawagakuen-mae - Tsurukawa

Tokyu Corporation - Tōkyū Den-en-toshi Line

- Minami-machida Grandberry Park - Suzukakedai - Tsukushino

JR East JR East - Yokohama Line

- Aihara - <Hashimoto - Sagamihara - Yabe - Fuchinobe - Kobuchi> - Machida - Naruse

Keio Corporation - Keiō Sagamihara Line

- Tamasakai

=== Highway ===
- Tōmei Expressway
- National Route 16
- National Route 246

== Notable people from Machida ==
- Aoba Fujino, football player
- Yū Kobayashi, football player
- Taiten Kusunoki, voice actor
- Ami Onuki, half of the J-pop group Puffy
- Satoshi Tajiri, creator of Pokémon; based Pallet Town on this town in the original Pokémon Red and Blue
- Masashi Takeda, Japanese professional wrestler and mixed martial artist
- Megumi Toyoguchi, voice actress

== Local attractions ==
- Buaisō museum, former residence of the Shirasu family
- Grandberry Park (Grandberry Mall closed in Feb 2017, redeveloped and re-opened in November 2019)
- Machida City Museum of Graphic Arts
- Machida Squirrel Garden
- Tadao Park
- Snoopy Museum

== Sports ==
- F.C. Machida Zelvia, a football club based in Machida
- Pescadola Machida, a futsal club based in Machida
