= Yabe Station =

Railway station in Sagamihara, Kanagawa Prefecture, Japan

JH26 Yabe Station 矢部駅
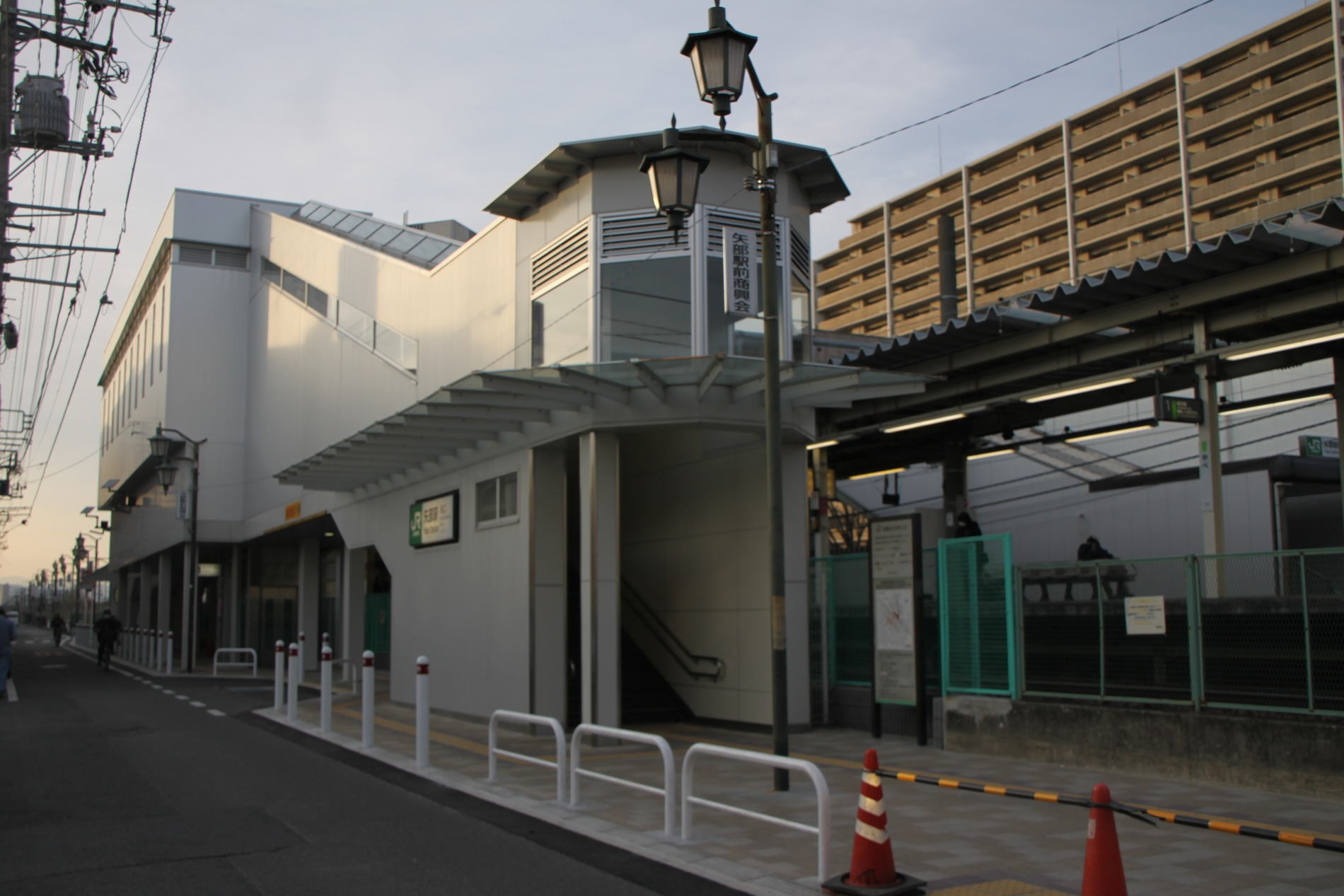
- South Exit of Yabe Station, May 2021

General information
- Location: Yabe 3-18, Chūō-ku, Sagamihara-shi, Kanagawa-ken 252-0232; Japan
- Coordinates: 35°34′23.0″N 139°23′12.4″E
- Operator: JR East
- Line: ■ Yokohama Line
- Distance: 29.2 km from Higashi-Kanagawa
- Platforms: 1 island platform
- Tracks: 2
- Connections: Bus stop

Construction
- Structure type: Ground level
- Accessible: Yes

Other information
- Status: Staffed
- Station code: JH26
- Website: Official website

History
- Opened: 1 October 1957

Passengers
- FY2019: 12,378 daily (boarding passengers)

Services
Preceding station	JR East	Following station
Sagamihara JH27 towards Hachiōji	Yokohama Line Local	Fuchinobe JH25 towards Higashi-Kanagawa or Ōfuna
Location
- Location within Kanagawa Prefecture Location within Japan

Yabe Station (矢部駅, Yabe-eki) is a passenger railway station located in Chūō-ku in the city of Sagamihara, Kanagawa Prefecture, Japan, and is operated by the East Japan Railway Company (JR East).

== Lines ==
Yabe Station is served by the Yokohama Line, and is located 29.2 kilometers from the terminus of the line at Higashi-Kanagawa.

== Station layout ==
Yabe Station is an elevated station with a single island platform serving two tracks. The station is attended, but its operation is consigned to East Japan Eco Access Co., Ltd.

=== Platforms ===
1	Yokohama Line	for Machida, Higashi-Kanagawa, Yokohama, Sakuragichō and Ōfuna
2	Yokohama Line	for Sagamihara, Hashimoto, and Hachiōji

== History ==
Yabe Station originated as a temporary stop for personnel working on the freight operations associated with the United States Army Sagami Fuel Depot, whose trains used the Yokohama Line tracks. The stop was upgraded to a train station on 1 October 1957 on the Japan National Railway (JNR). The station building was rebuilt in October 1979. With the privatization of the JNR on 1 April 1987, the station came under the operational control of JR East.

Station numbering was introduced on 20 August 2016 with Yabe being assigned station number JH26.

== Passenger statistics ==
In fiscal 2019, the station was used by an average of 12,378 passengers daily (boarding passengers only).

The passenger figures (boarding passengers only) for previous years are as shown below.

Fiscal year	daily average
2005	10,949
2010	11,178
2015	12,297

== Surrounding area ==
- Azabu University
- Fuchinobe High School
- U.S. Forces Japan Sagami General Depot

== See also ==
- List of railway stations in Japan
