= Katakura Station =

Railway station in Hachiōji, Tokyo, Japan

JH31 Katakura Station 片倉駅
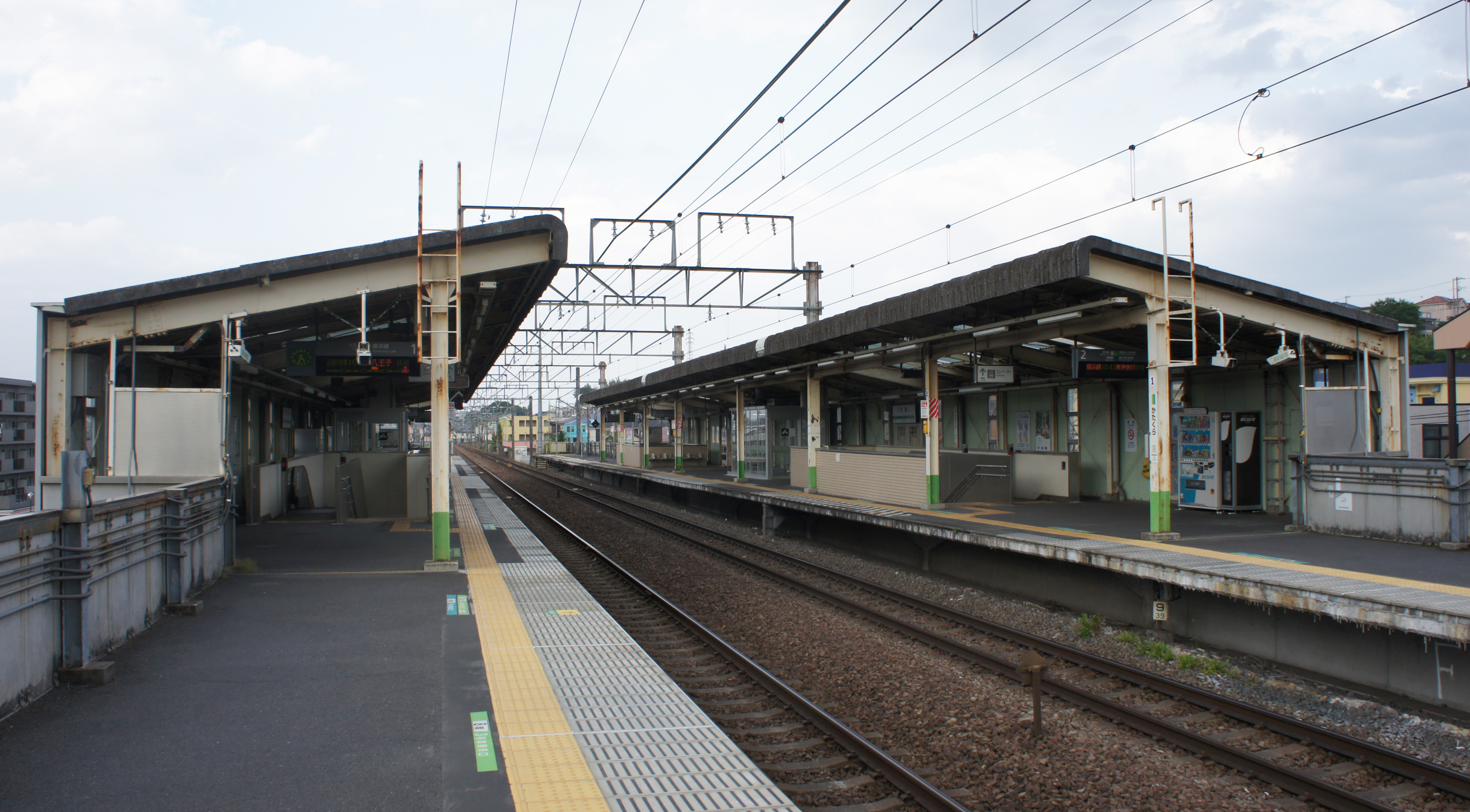
- Katakura Station platforms in May 2021

General information
- Location: 718 Katakura-machi, Hachiōji-shi, Tokyo 192-0914; Japan
- Coordinates: 35°38′22.9″N 139°20′29″E
- Operator: JR East
- Line: ■ Yokohama Line
- Distance: 40.0 km from Higashi-Kanagawa
- Platforms: 2 side platforms
- Tracks: 2

Construction
- Structure type: Elevated

Other information
- Status: Staffed
- Website: Official website

History
- Opened: 28 December 1957

Passengers
- FY2019: 5,212 daily

Services
Preceding station	JR East	Following station
Hachiōji JH32 Terminus	Yokohama Line Rapid Local	Hachiōji-Minamino JH30 towards Higashi-Kanagawa or Ōfuna
Location
- Location within Tokyo Location within Japan

Katakura Station (片倉駅, Katakura-eki) is a passenger railway station located in the city of Hachiōji, Tokyo, Japan, operated by the East Japan Railway Company (JR East).

== Lines ==
Katakura Station is served by the Yokohama Line from Hachiōji to Higashi-Kanagawa, and is located 2.6 km from the northern terminus of the line at Hachiōji.

== Station layout ==
The station consists of two elevated opposed side platforms serving two tracks, with the station building located underneath. The station is attended.

=== Platforms ===
1	Yokohama Line	for Hachiōji
2	Yokohama Line	for Machida, Higashi-Kanagawa, Yokohama, Sakuragichō and Ōfuna

== History ==
The station opened on 28 December 1957. A new station building with elevated tracks was completed in March 1988, coinciding with the doubling of the Yokohama line between Hachiōji and Aihara.

Station numbering was introduced on 20 August 2016 with Katakura being assigned station number JH31.

== Passenger statistics ==
In fiscal 2019, the station was used by an average of 5,212 passengers daily (boarding passengers only).

The passenger figures (boarding passengers only) for previous years are as shown below.

Fiscal year	daily average
2005	5,269
2010	5,157
2015	5,213

== Surrounding area ==
- Hachioji City Yui Civic Center
- Hachioji Katakura Post Office
- Fujitanido Park

== See also ==
- List of railway stations in Japan
