= Machida City Museum of Graphic Arts =

Museum in Machida, Tokyo, Japan

- 町田市立国際版画美術館
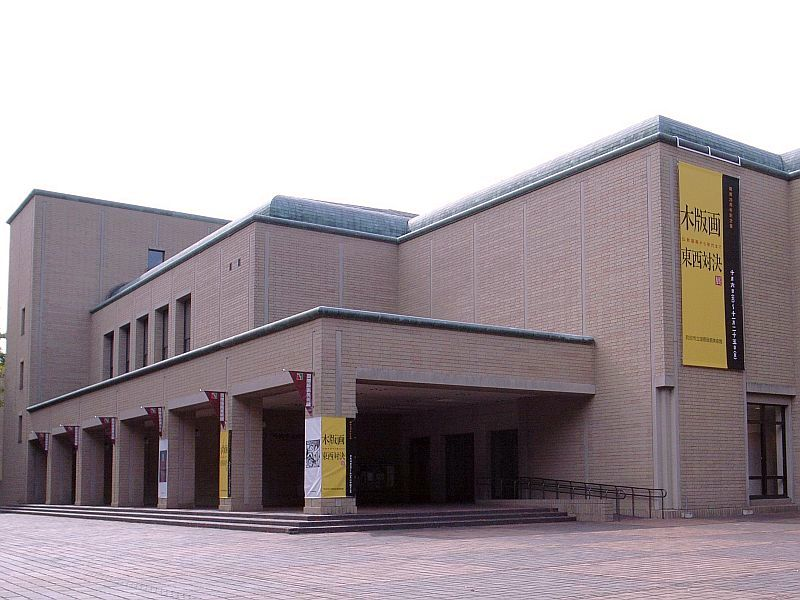
- Established: 1987
- Location: Haramachida, Machida, Tokyo, Japan
- Type: museum
- Website: Official website

The Machida City Museum of Graphic Arts (町田市立国際版画美術館, Machida Shiritsu Kokusai Hanga Bijutsukan) is a museum in Haramachida, Machida City, Tokyo, Japan.

== History ==
The museum opened in 1987.

== Exhibitions ==
The museum exhibits 30,000 Japanese and Western paintings since 8th century until today. It has permanent and temporary exhibitions.

== Transportation ==
The museum is accessible within walking distance east of Machida Station of East Japan Railway Company or Machida Station of Odakyu Electric Railway.

== See also ==
- List of museums in Tokyo
