= Sagamihara Station =

Railway station in Sagamihara, Kanagawa Prefecture, Japan

JH27 Sagamihara Station 相模原駅
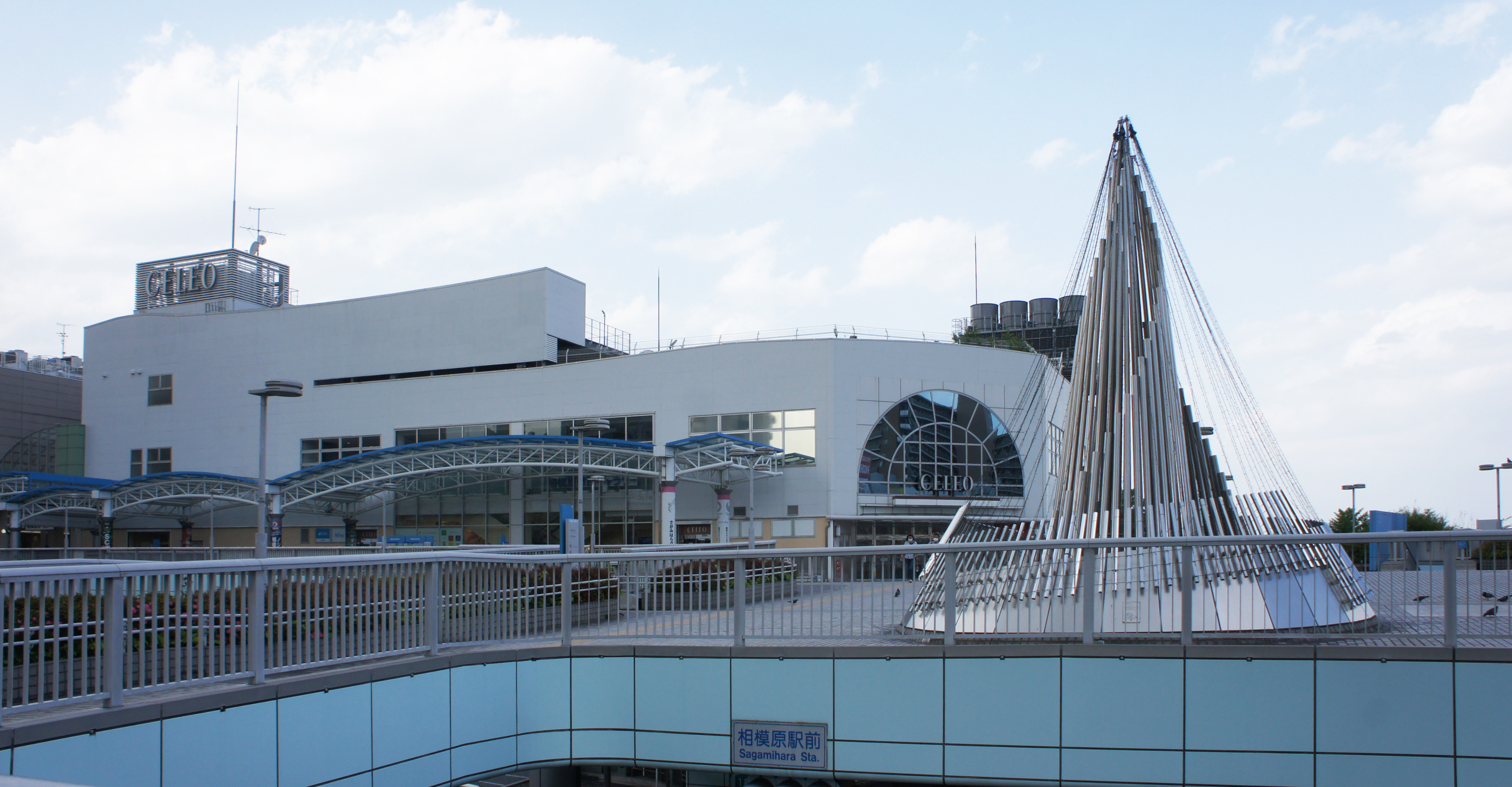
- South exit of Sagamihara Station, May 2021

General information
- Location: 1 Sagamihara, Chūō-ku, Sagamihara-shi, Kanagawa-ken 252-0231; Japan
- Coordinates: 35.5814°N 139.370531°E
- Operator: JR East
- Line: ■ Yokohama Line
- Distance: 31.0 km from Higashi-Kanagawa
- Platforms: 2 side platforms
- Connections: Bus stop

Other information
- Status: Staffed (Midori no Madoguchi)
- Station code: JH27
- Website: Official website

History
- Opened: 4 April 1941

Passengers
- FY2019: 29,160 daily (boarding passengers)

Services
| Preceding station | JR East | Following station |
|---|---|---|
| Hashimoto JH28 towards Hachiōji | Yokohama Line Rapid | Machida JH23 towards Higashi-Kanagawa or Ōfuna |
| Hashimoto JH28 towards Hachiōji | Yokohama Line Local | Yabe JH26 towards Higashi-Kanagawa or Ōfuna |
Location
- Location within Kanagawa Prefecture Location within Japan

Sagamihara Station (相模原駅, Sagamihara-eki) is a passenger railway station located in Chūō-ku in the city of Sagamihara, Kanagawa Prefecture, Japan, and is operated by the East Japan Railway Company (JR East).

== Lines ==
Sagamihara Station is served by the Yokohama Line, and is located 31.0 kilometers from the terminus of the line at Higashi-Kanagawa and is 31.0 km from the southern terminus of the Yokohama Line at Higashi-Kanagawa.

== Station layout ==
Sagamihara Station is an elevated station with two opposed side platforms serving two tracks. The station has a "Midori no Madoguchi" staffed ticket office.

=== Platforms ===
| 1 | Yokohama Line | for Hashimoto, and Hachiōji |
| 2 | Yokohama Line | for Machida, Higashi-Kanagawa, Yokohama, Sakuragichō and Ōfuna |

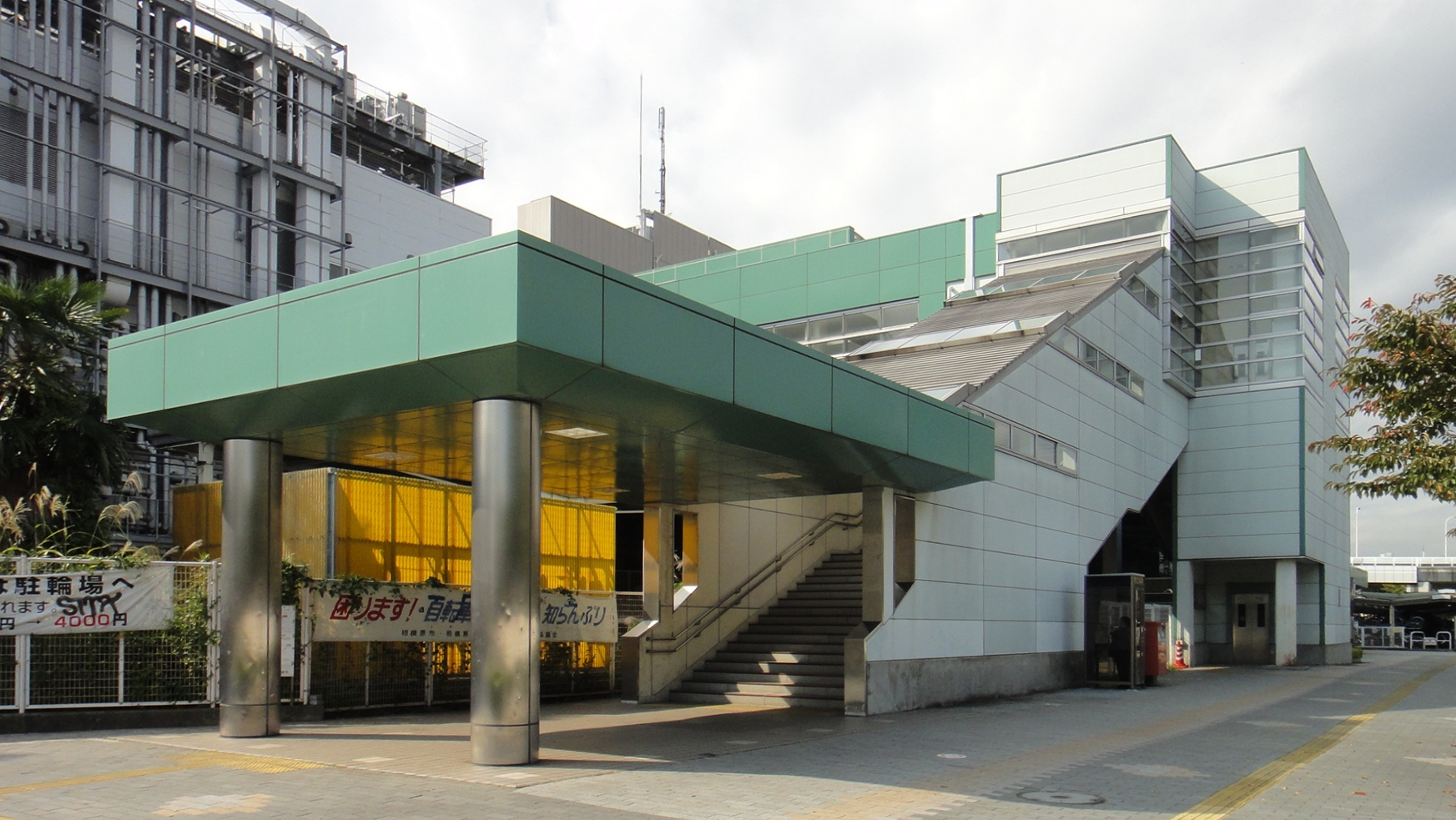
North side of the station, October 2012

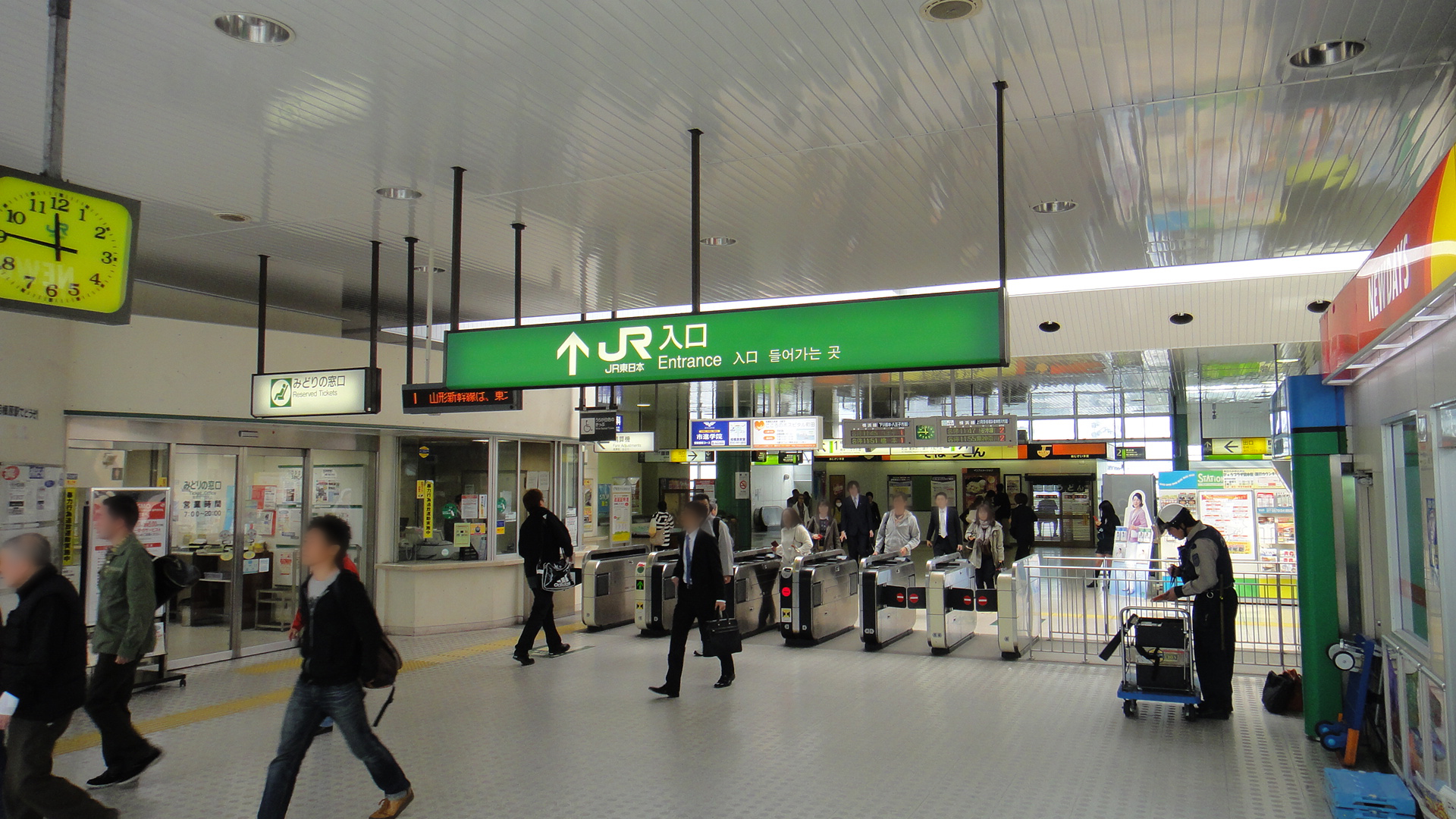
Ticket barriers, October 2012

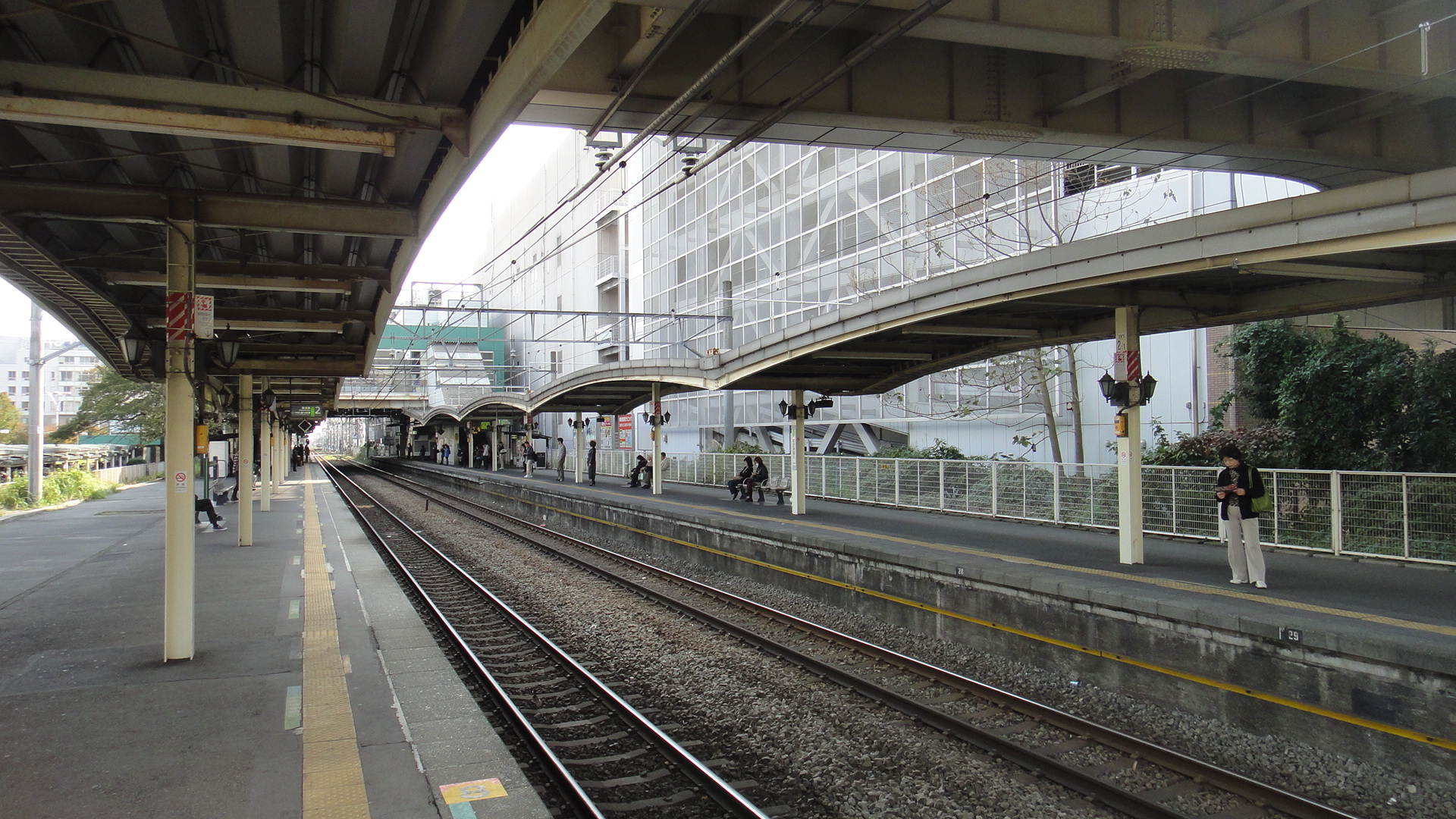
View from platform 2 looking south, October 2012

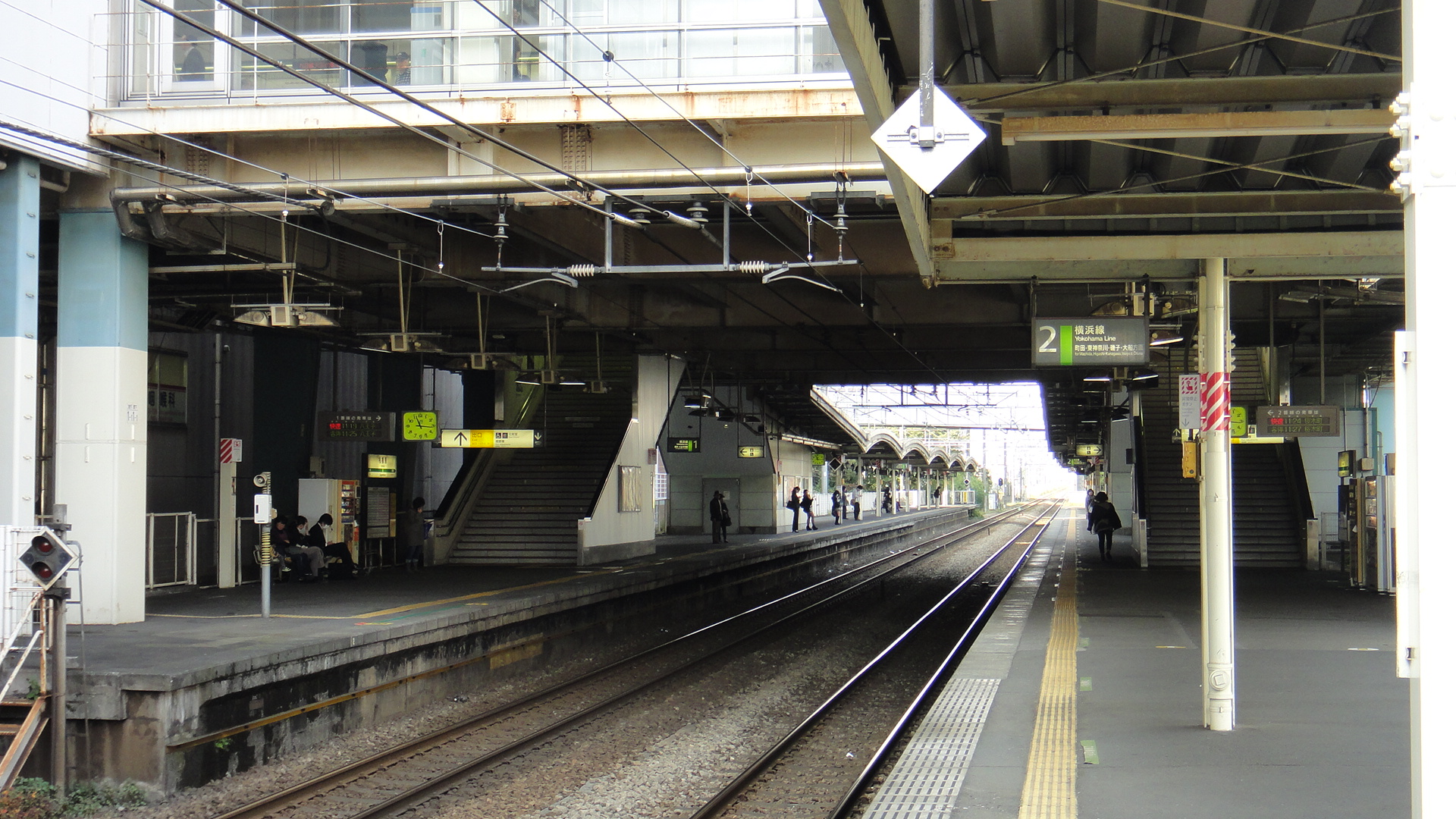
View from platform 2 looking north, October 2012

== History ==
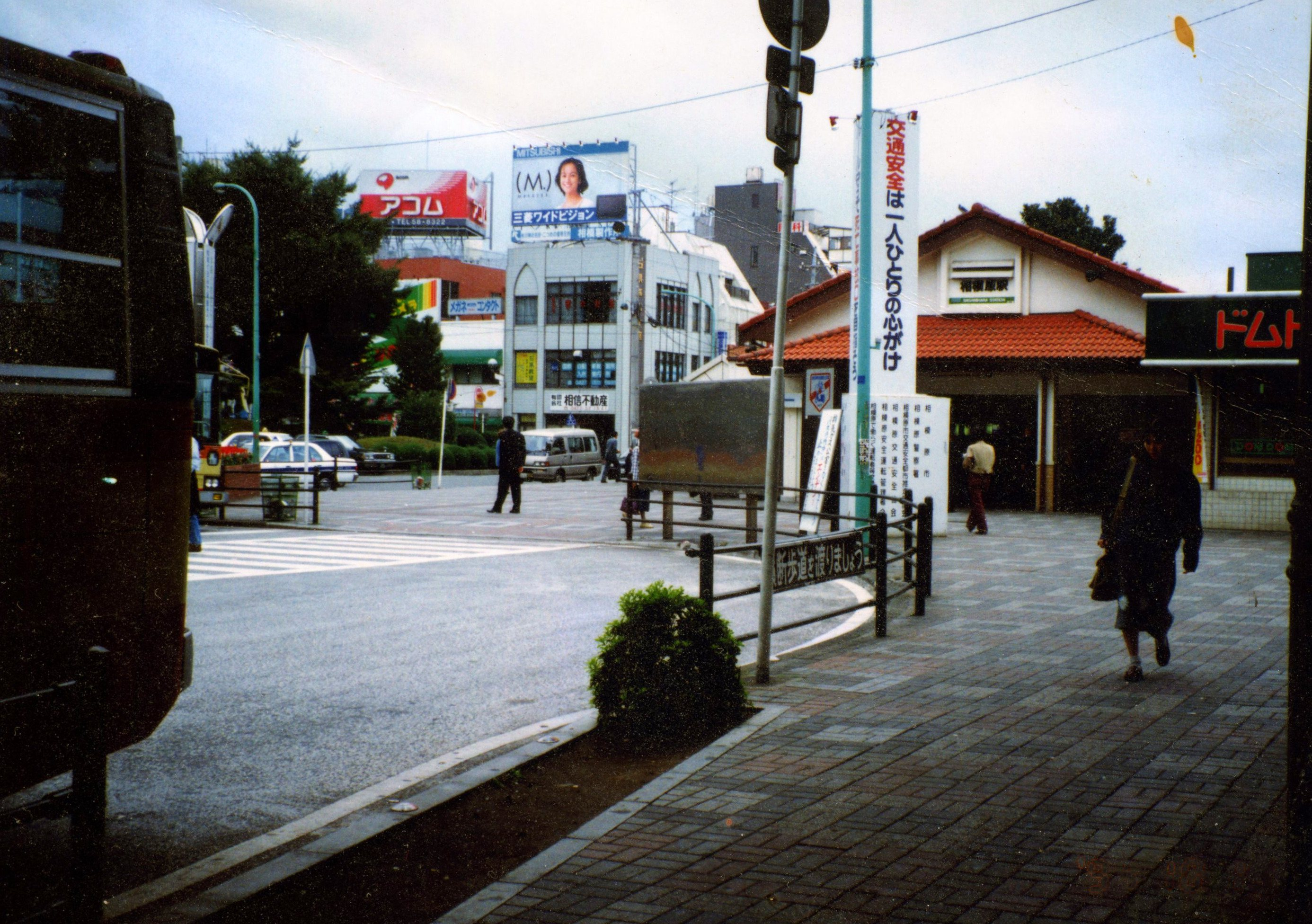
Sagamihara Station before rebuilding, October 1994

Sagamahara Station was opened on 4 April 1941 as a station on the Japanese Government Railway (JGR). The JGR became the Japanese National Railways (JNR) after World War II. With the privatization of JNR on 1 April 1987, the station came under the operational control of JR East. A new station building was completed in October 1996.

Station numbering was introduced on 20 August 2016 with Sagamihara being assigned station number JH27.

== Passenger statistics ==
In fiscal 2019, the station was used by an average of 29,160 passengers daily (boarding passengers only).

The passenger figures (boarding passengers only) for previous years are as shown below.

| Fiscal year | daily average |
|---|---|
| 2005 | 26,943 |
| 2010 | 28,079 |
| 2015 | 28,959 |

== Surrounding area ==
- Sagamihara City Office
- US Army Sagami General Depot

== See also ==
- List of railway stations in Japan
