= Kita-Hachiōji Station =

Railway station in Hachiōji, Tokyo, Japan

Kita-Hachiōji Station 北八王子駅
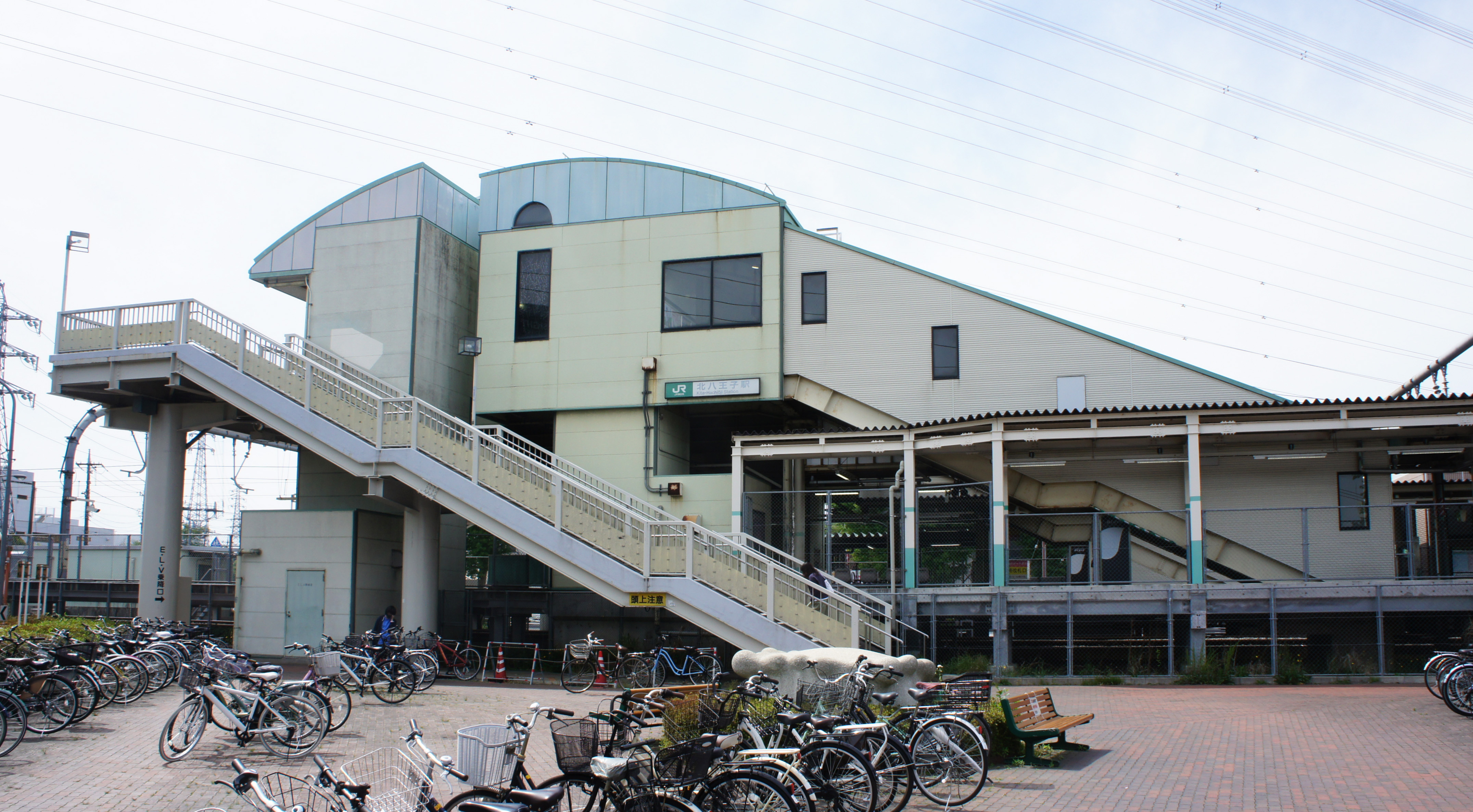
- The east side of the station in April 2021

General information
- Location: 2953–1 Ishikawa-machi, Hachiōji-shi, Tokyo 192-0032; Japan
- Coordinates: 35°40′10″N 139°21′48″E
- Operator: JR East
- Line: ■ Hachikō Line
- Distance: 3.1 km from Hachiōji
- Platforms: 2 side platforms
- Tracks: 2

Other information
- Status: Staffed
- Website: Official website

History
- Opened: 10 June 1959

Passengers
- FY2019: 9,649 daily

Services
Preceding station	JR East	Following station
Komiya towards Komagawa	Hachikō Line	Hachiōji Terminus
Location
- Location within Tokyo Location within Japan

Kita-Hachiōji Station (北八王子駅, Kita Hachiōji-eki) is a passenger railway station located in the city of Hachiōji, Tokyo, Japan, operated by East Japan Railway Company (JR East).

== Lines ==
Kita-Hachiōji Station is served by the Hachikō Line between Hachiōji and Komagawa, with many services continuing to and from Kawagoe on the Kawagoe Line. The station is 3.1 kilometers from the official starting point of the line at Hachiōji Station.

== Station layout ==
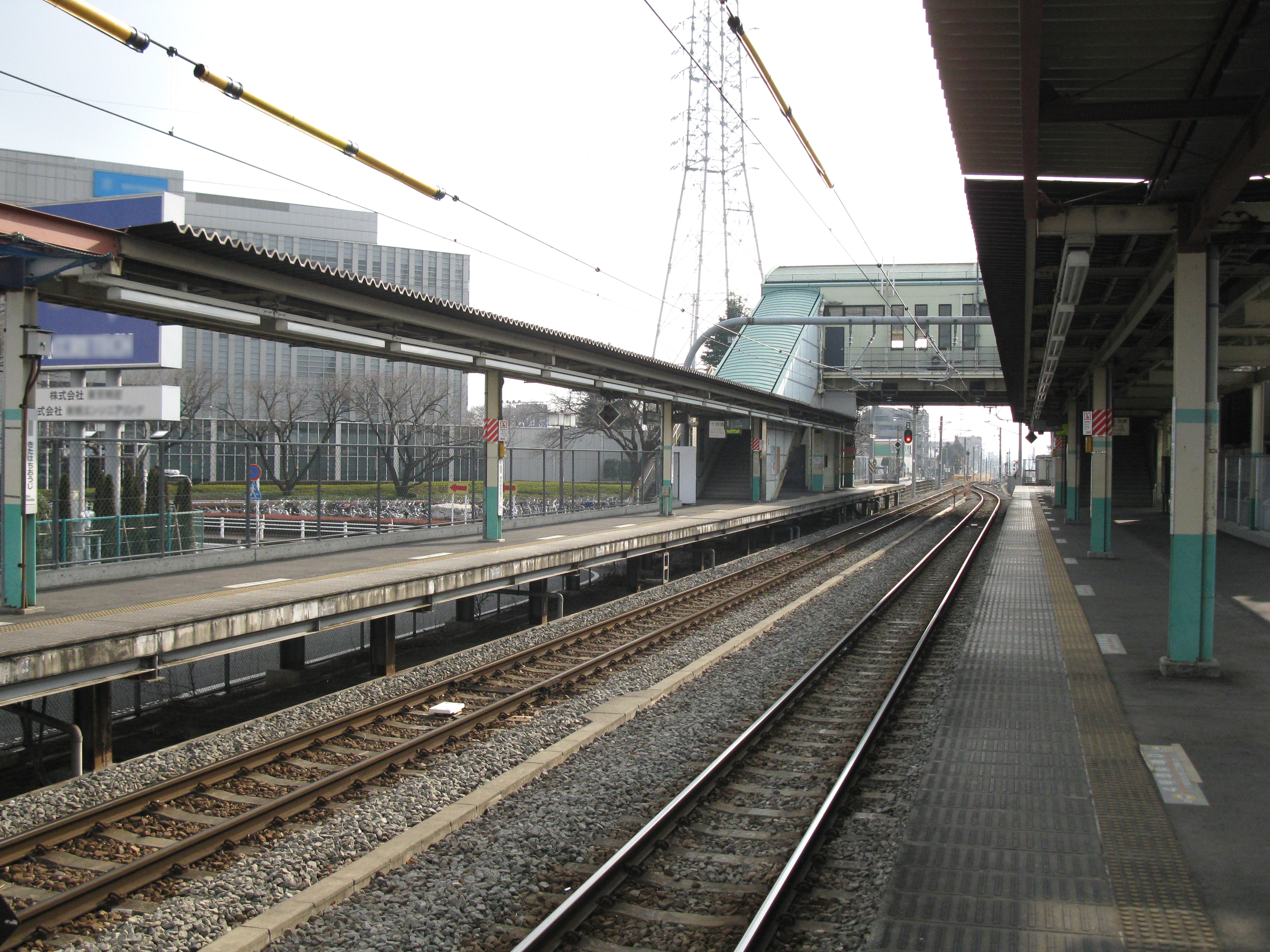
View of the platforms, February 2009

The station consists of two ground-level opposed side platforms serving two tracks, which form a passing loop on the single-track line. The tracks are connected by the elevated station building, which is built above and perpendicular to the tracks. The station is attended.

=== Platforms ===
1	■ Hachikō Line	for Hachiōji
2	■ Hachikō Line	for Haijima, Komagawa, and Kawagoe

== History ==
The station opened on 10 June 1959. It became part of the East Japan Railway Company (JR East) with the breakup of the Japanese National Railways (JNR) on 1 April 1987.

The southern section of the Hachikō Line between Hachiōji and Komagawa was electrified on 16 March 1996, with through services commencing between Hachiōji and Kawagoe.

== Passenger statistics ==
In fiscal 2019, the station was used by an average of 9,649 passengers daily (boarding passengers only).

The passenger figures (boarding passengers only) for previous years are as shown below.

Fiscal year	daily average
2005	6,743
2010	6,925
2015	8,839

== Surrounding area ==
- Japan National Route 20
- Tokyo Metropolitan Hachioji Higashi High School
- Tokyo Metropolitan University Hino Campus
- Tokai University School of Medicine Hachioji Hospital
- Olympus Factory
