= Yokohama Line =

Railway line in Japan

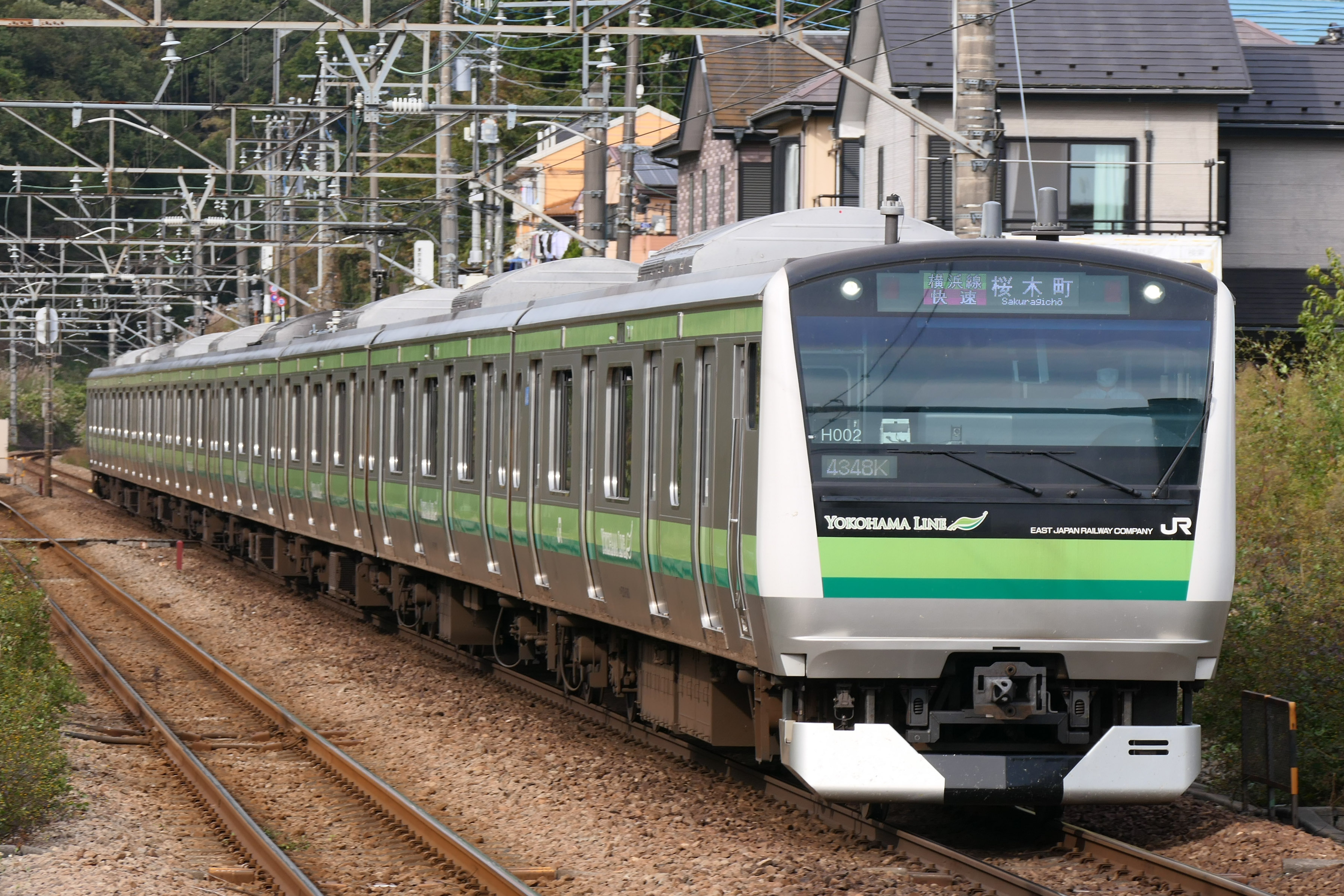
- A Yokohama Line E233-6000 series EMU

Overview
- Native name: 横浜線
- Locale: Kanagawa Prefecture, Tokyo
- Termini: Hachiōji; Higashi-Kanagawa
- Stations: 20

Service
- Type: Heavy rail
- Operator: JR East
- Rolling stock: E233-6000 series
- Daily ridership: 840,200 (daily 2015)

History
- Opened: 23 September 1908; 118 years ago

Technical
- Line length: 42.6 km (26.5 mi)
- Track gauge: 1,067 mm (3 ft 6 in)
- Electrification: Overhead line, 1,500 V DC
- Operating speed: 95 km/h (59 mph)
Route map

The Yokohama Line (Japanese: 横浜線, Hepburn: Yokohama-sen) is a Japanese railway line of the East Japan Railway Company (JR East) connecting Higashi-Kanagawa Station in Yokohama, Kanagawa and Hachiōji Station in Hachiōji, Tokyo. The line forms part of what JR East refers to as the "Tokyo Mega Loop" (東京メガループ) around Tokyo, consisting of the Keiyo Line, Musashino Line, Nambu Line, and Yokohama Line. The line's name comes from the section between Nagatsuta and Higashi-Kanagawa that runs through the city of Yokohama. Nicknamed the Hama-sen (浜線) by locals, the line serves commuters in the southwestern suburbs of Tokyo and northeastern suburbs of Yokohama.

== History ==
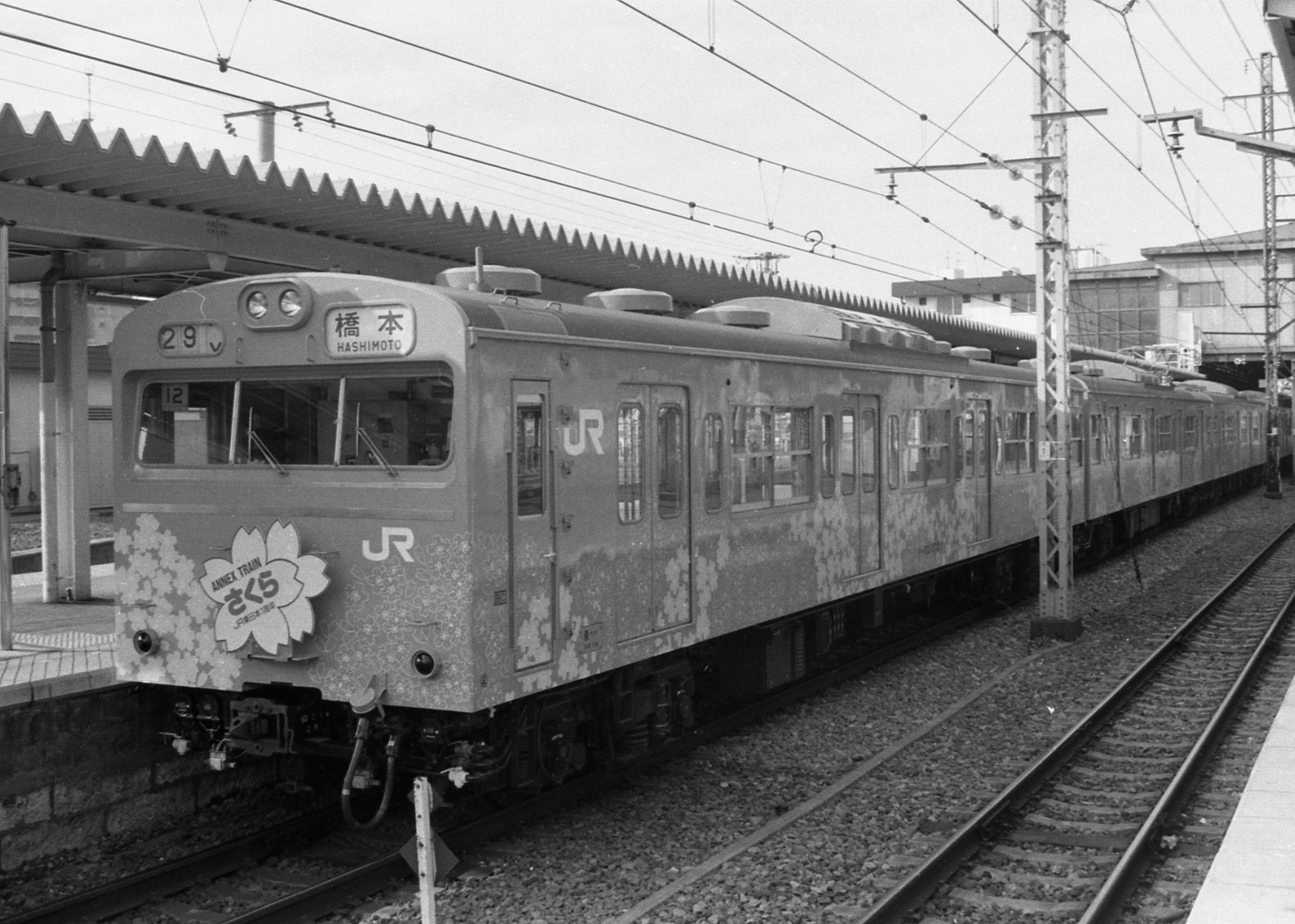
A Yokohama Line 103 series at Higashi-Kanagawa Station marking the first anniversary of JR East, April 1988

The line was opened by the private Yokohama Railway (横浜鉄道, Yokohama Tetsudō) on 23 September 1908 and leased to the government in 1910. The line was nationalized on 1 October 1917.

The Higashi-Kanagawa to Haramachida (now Machida) section was electrified on 1 October 1932, with the Haramachida to Hachiōji section electrified on 14 April 1941.

The Higashi-Kanagawa to Kozukue section was double-tracked by 1968, extended to Aihara by 1980, and completed to Hachiōji on 6 March 1988.

Through service trains from the Sagami Line began on 16 March 1991, when that line was fully electrified.

Station numbering was introduced on 20 August 2016 with stations being assigned station numbers between JH13 and JH32. Numbers increase towards in the westbound direction towards Hachioji.

Through service operation from the Sagami Line onto the Yokohama Line ended on 11 March 2022.

== Operation ==
Despite the line's name, only approximately half of all trains run through Yokohama Station via the Keihin–Tōhoku Line. Most of these through service trains terminate at Sakuragichō Station via the Negishi Line, with few trains continuing further west towards Ōfuna Station. Rapid service (快速, Kaisoku) trains operate every 20 minutes during the daytime.

== Stations ==
- Local trains stop at all stations.
- Information on the limited express Hama Kaiji service can be found on its page.
- Rapid trains stop at stations marked "●" and pass those marked "|".
- From Yokohama to Ofuna, the stations are the same stations served by the Negishi Line, which is also served by the Keihin-Tohoku line.

No.	Station	Distance in km (mi)		Rapid	Transfers	Location	
No.	Station	Between stations	Total	Rapid	Transfers	Location	
↑ Through-running to/from Yokohama and Ōfuna via the Negishi Line ↑
JH13	Higashi-Kanagawa 東神奈川	—N/a	0 (0)	●	Keihin–Tōhoku Line (JK13); Main Line (Keikyū Higashi-kanagawa: KK35)	Kanagawa, Yokohama	Kanagawa
JH14	Ōguchi 大口	2.2 (1.4)		|		Kanagawa, Yokohama	Kanagawa
JH15	Kikuna 菊名	2.6 (1.6)	4.8 (3.0)	●	Tōyoko Line (TY16)	Kōhoku, Yokohama	Kanagawa
JH16	Shin-Yokohama 新横浜	1.3 (0.81)	6.1 (3.8)	●	Tokaido Shinkansen; Sōtetsu Shin-Yokohama Line (SO52); Tōkyū Shin-Yokohama Line (SH01); Blue Line (B25)	Kōhoku, Yokohama	Kanagawa
JH17	Kozukue 小机	1.7 (1.1)	7.8 (4.8)	|		Kōhoku, Yokohama	Kanagawa
JH18	Kamoi 鴨居	3.1 (1.9)	10.9 (6.8)	●		Midori, Yokohama	Kanagawa
JH19	Nakayama 中山	2.6 (1.6)	13.5 (8.4)	●	Green Line (G01)	Midori, Yokohama	Kanagawa
JH20	Tōkaichiba 十日市場	2.4 (1.5)	15.9 (9.9)	|		Midori, Yokohama	Kanagawa
JH21	Nagatsuta 長津田	2.0 (1.2)	17.9 (11.1)	●	Den-en-toshi Line (DT22); Kodomonokuni Line (KD01)	Midori, Yokohama	Kanagawa
JH22	Naruse 成瀬	2.3 (1.4)	20.2 (12.6)	|		Machida	Tokyo
JH23	Machida 町田	2.7 (1.7)	22.9 (14.2)	●	Odawara Line (OH27)	Machida	Tokyo
JH24	Kobuchi 古淵	2.8 (1.7)	25.7 (16.0)	|		Minami, Sagamihara	Kanagawa
JH25	Fuchinobe 淵野辺	2.8 (1.7)	28.4 (17.6)	|		Chūō, Sagamihara	Kanagawa
JH26	Yabe 矢部	0.8 (0.50)	29.2 (18.1)	|		Chūō, Sagamihara	Kanagawa
JH27	Sagamihara 相模原	1.8 (1.1)	31.0 (19.3)	●		Chūō, Sagamihara	Kanagawa
JH28	Hashimoto 橋本	2.8 (1.7)	33.8 (21.0)	●	■ Sagami Line; Sagamihara Line (KO45)	Midori, Sagamihara	Kanagawa
JH29	Aihara 相原	1.9 (1.2)	35.7 (22.2)	●		Machida	Tokyo
JH30	Hachiōji-Minamino 八王子みなみ野	2.9 (1.8)	38.6 (24.0)	●		Hachiōji	Tokyo
JH31	Katakura 片倉	1.4 (0.87)	40.0 (24.9)	●	Takao Line (Keiō-Katakura: KO48)	Hachiōji	Tokyo
JH32	Hachiōji 八王子	2.6 (1.6)	42.6 (26.5)	●	Chūō Line (JC22); ■ Hachikō Line; Keiō Line (Keiō-Hachiōji: KO34)	Hachiōji	Tokyo

== Rolling stock ==
=== Local and Rapid services ===
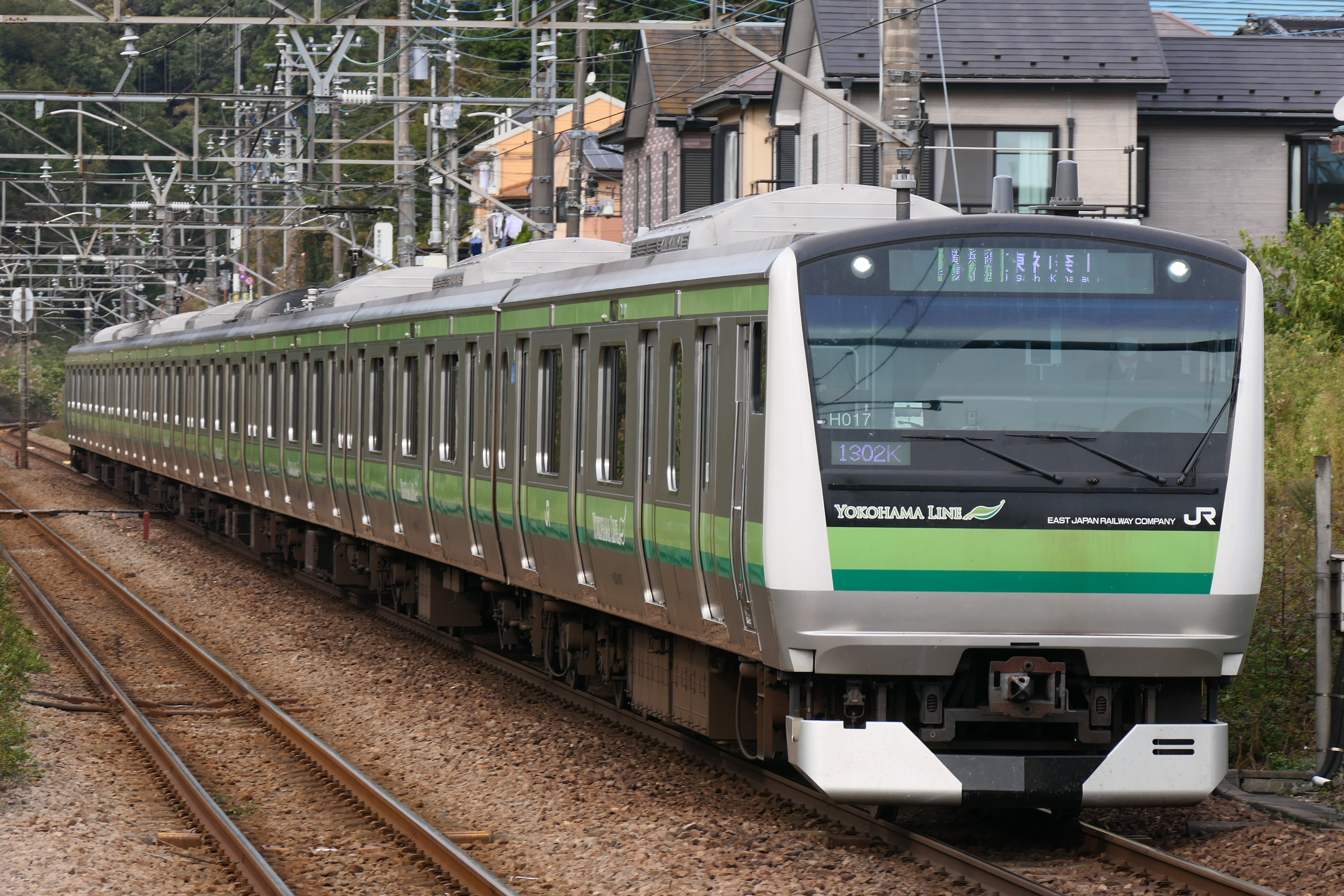
Yokohama Line E233-6000 series EMU, October 2020

- E233-6000 series 8-car EMUs (since February 2014)

=== Former ===
- 72 series
- 103 series (from 2 October 1972 until 26 February 1989)
- 205 series 8-car EMUs (1988 to August 2014)

8-car 205 series EMU trains were introduced in 1988. In these sets, the second car from the Higashi-Kanagawa end had six pairs of doors on each side to allow rapid boarding and disembarking during peak periods. The last 205 series set on the Yokohama Line ran on 23 August 2014.

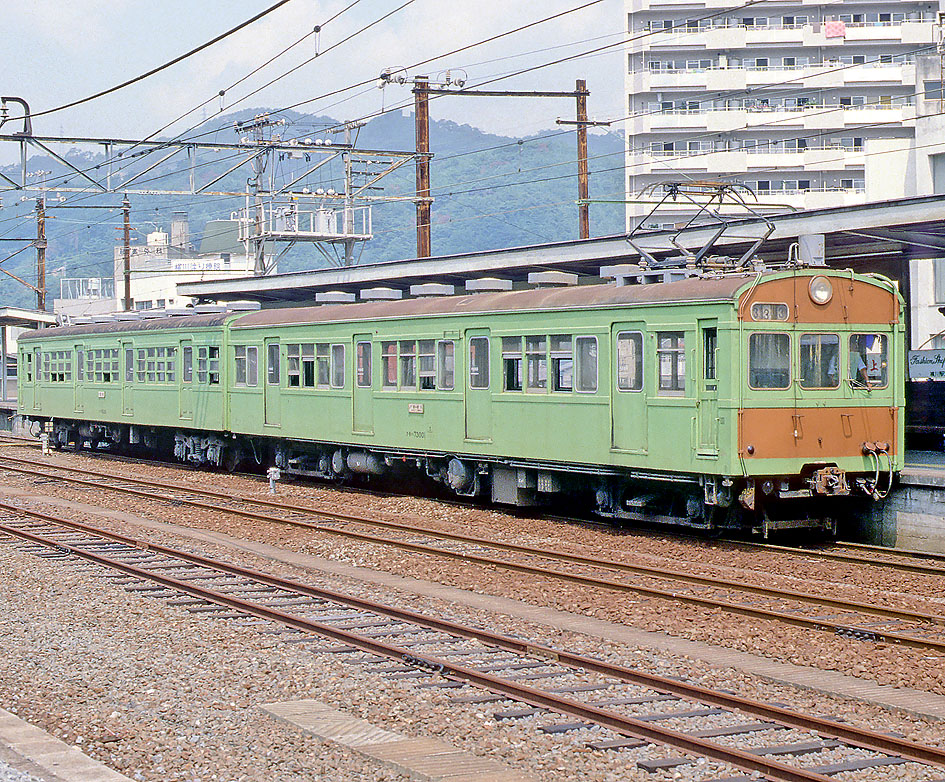
72 series EMU, July 1984

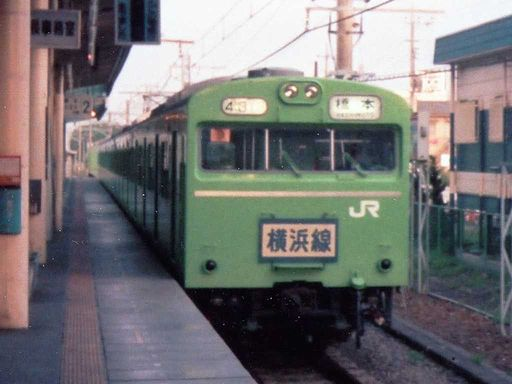
103 series EMU at Fuchinobe Station, circa 1988

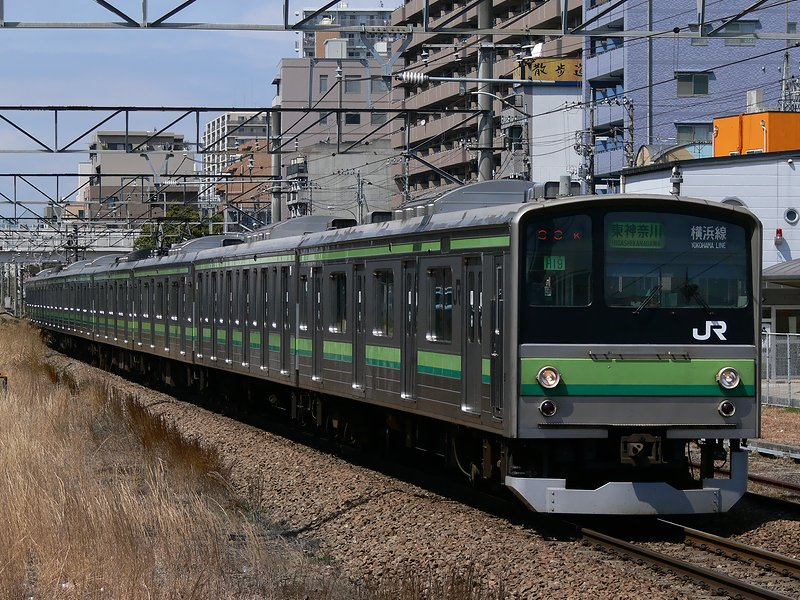
A Yokohama Line 205 series EMU, March 2007

==== Sagami Line through services ====
- 205-500 series 4-car EMUs (from 16 March 1991 until 25 February 2022)
- E131-500 series 4-car EMUs (from 18 November 2021 until 11 March 2022)
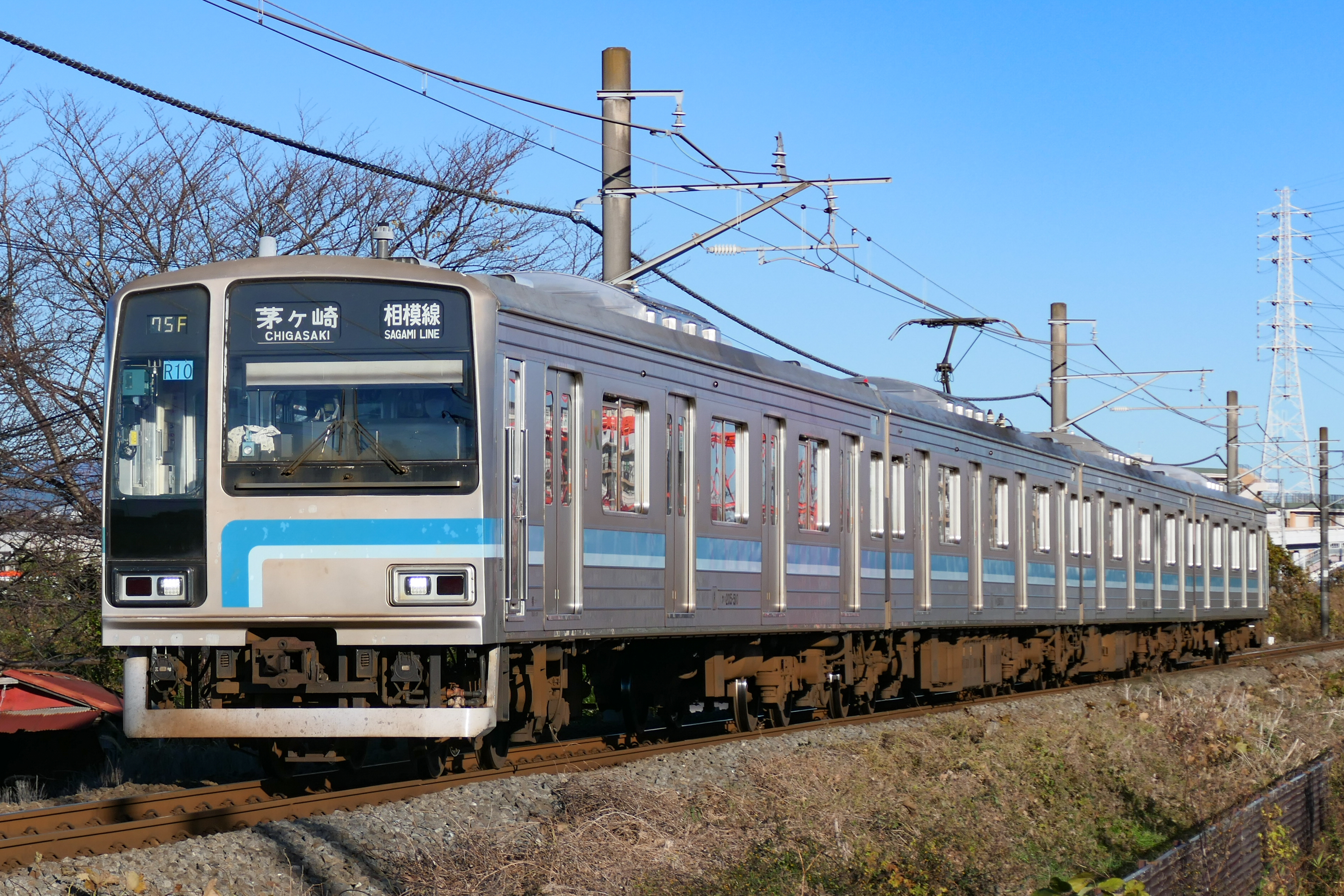
Sagami Line 205-500 series EMU, November 2021

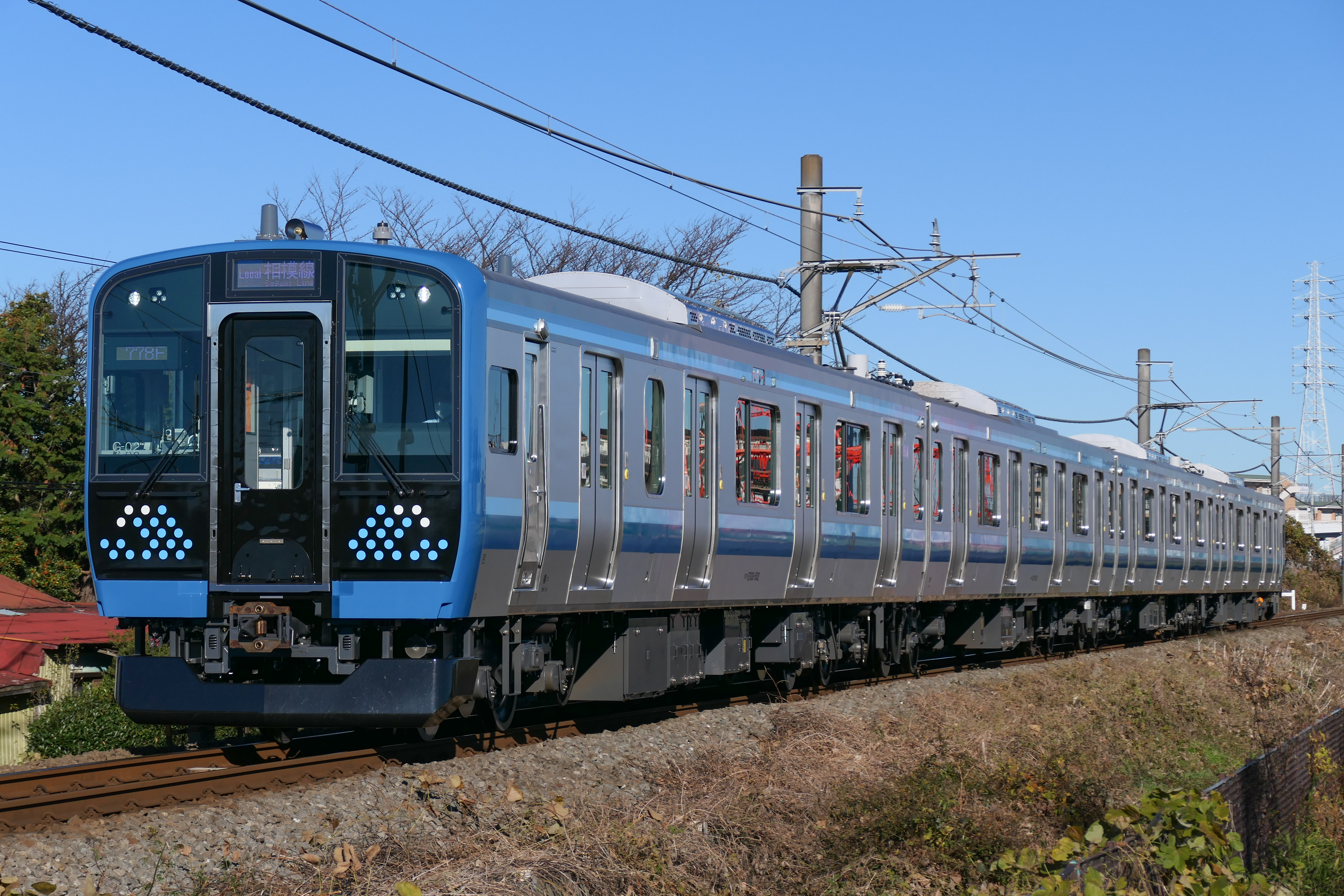
Sagami Line E131-500 series EMU, November 2021
