= Tsurukawa Women's Junior College =

College in Tokyo, Japan

Coordinates: 35°34′10.53″N 139°29′37.04″E

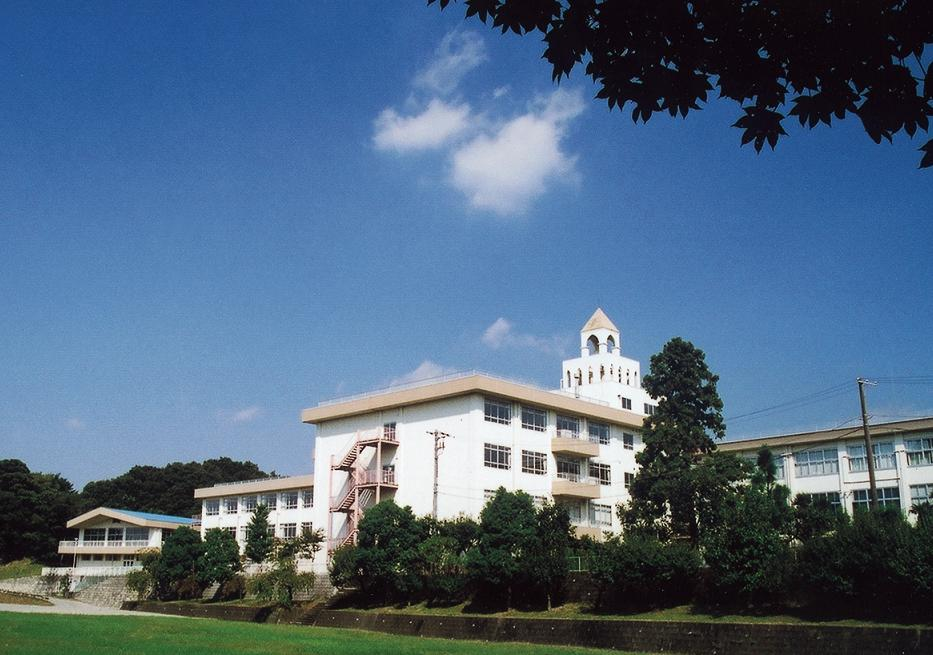
Tsurukawa Women's Junior College

Tsurukawa Women's Junior College (鶴川女子短期大学, Tsurukawa joshi tanki daigaku) is a private junior college in Machida, Tokyo, Japan. The precursor of the school was founded in 1926, and it was chartered as a university in 1968.
