= Haramachida =

Haramachida 原町田
- District
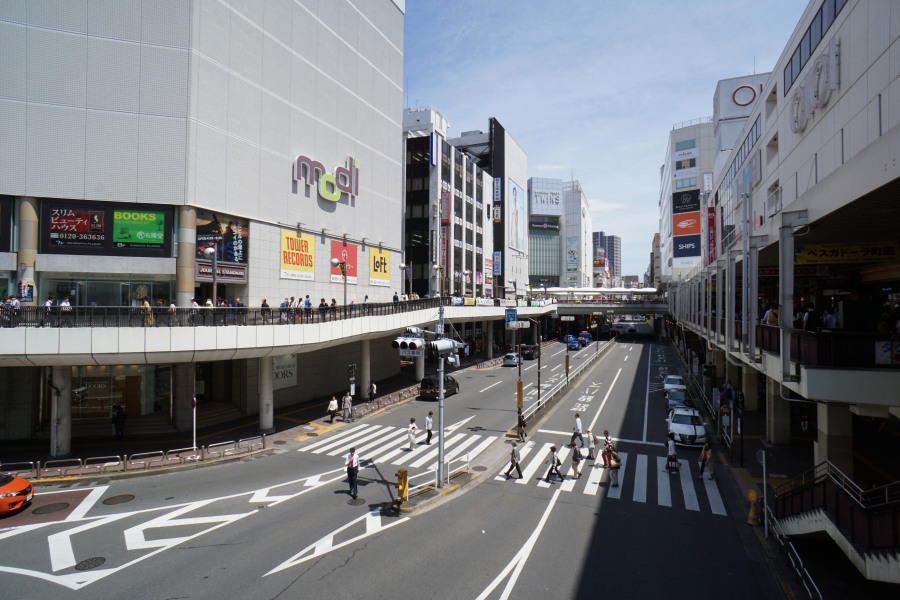

- Location within Tokyo
- Coordinates: 35°32′36.4″N 139°26′42.83″E
- Country: Japan
- Prefecture: Tokyo
- City: Machida

Area
  - Total: 1.017 km^{2} (0.393 sq mi)

Population (January 1, 2018)
  - Total: 14,257
  - Density: 14,020/km^{2} (36,310/sq mi)
- Time zone: UTC+9 (JST)
- Postal code: 194-0013
- Area code: 042

Haramachida (原町田) is a district of Machida, Tokyo, Japan. The current administrative place name is Haramachida 1-chome to 6-chome (residential addressing system).
