= Scarlet sage =

Scarlet sage may refer to either of two plants in the genus Salvia (sages and claries):

- Salvia coccinea – Blood sage
- Salvia splendens – Tropical sage
