= Machida Station (Tokyo) =

Railway station in Machida, Tokyo, Japan

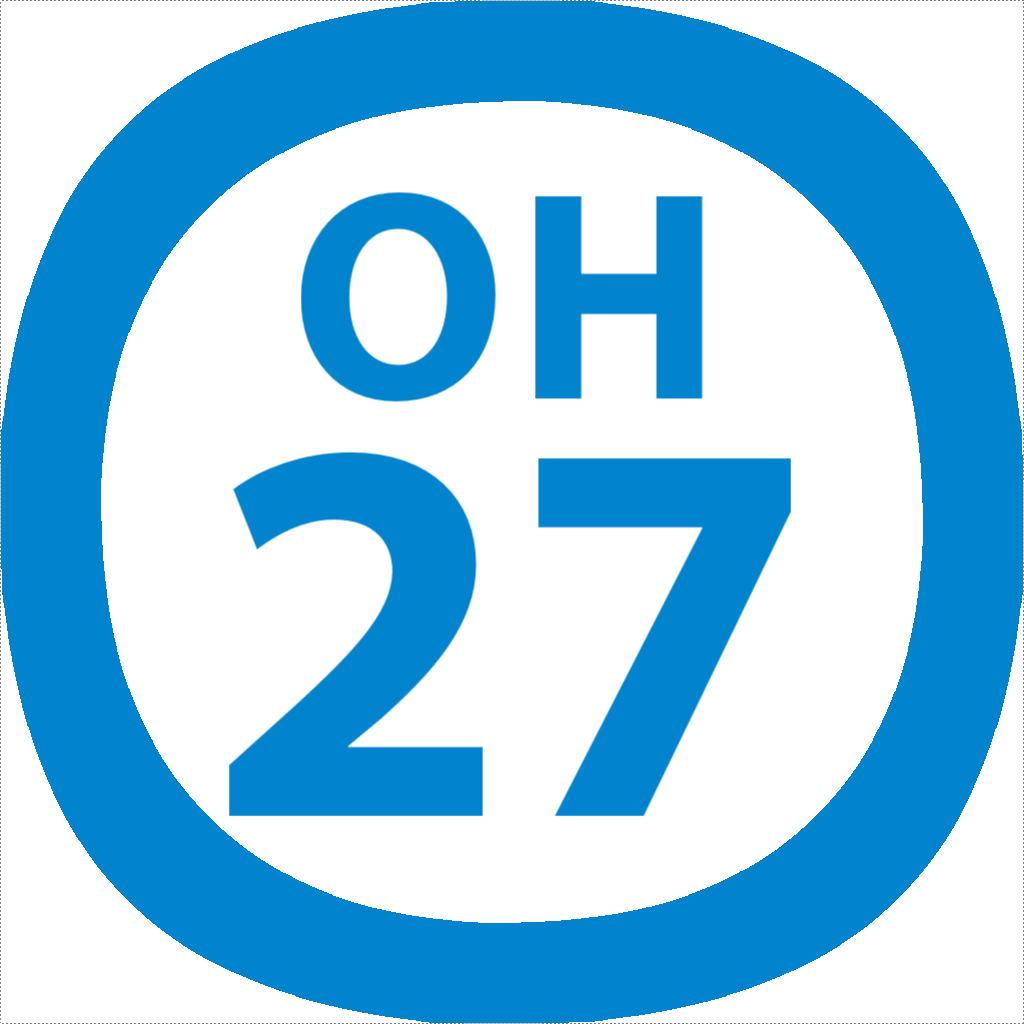
JH23 Machida Station 町田駅

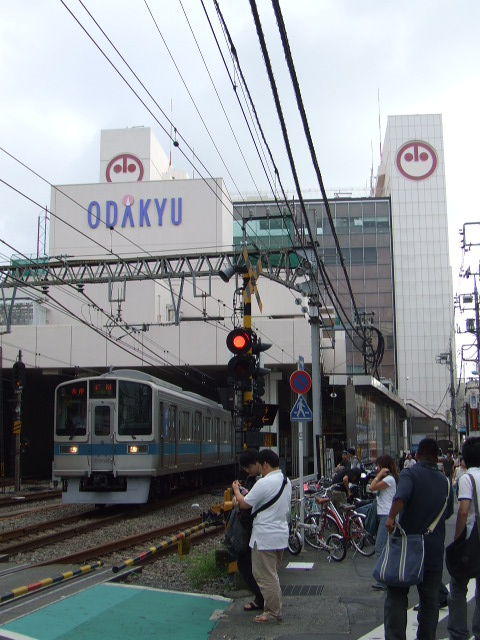
- The Odakyu Line station building, and the Odakyu Department Store

General information
- Location: 6-12-20 Haramachida District, Machida City, Tokyo 194-0013; Japan
- Coordinates: 35°32′39.17″N 139°26′43.07″E
- Operator: JR East; Odakyu Electric Railway
- Lines: Yokohama Line; Odakyu Odawara Line
- Distance: 22.9 km (14.2 mi) from Higashi-Kanagawa; 30.8 km (19.1 mi) from Shinjuku
- Platforms: JR East: 2 island platforms Odakyu: 2 island platforms

Construction
- Structure type: At grade (JR East); Elevated (Odakyu)

Other information
- Status: Staffed ("Midori no Madoguchi")
- Station code: JH23; OH27

History
- Opened: 23 September 1908; 118 years ago (JR East); 1 April 1927; 99 years ago (Odakyu)
- Former names: Haramachida (until 1980); Shin-Haramachida (until 1976)

Passengers
- FY2019: 110,899 daily (JR East); 289,419 daily (Odakyu)

Services
Preceding station	JR East	Following station
Sagamihara JH27 towards Hachiōji	Yokohama Line Rapid	Nagatsuta JH21 towards Higashi-Kanagawa or Ōfuna
Kobuchi JH24 towards Hachiōji	Yokohama Line Local	Naruse JH22 towards Higashi-Kanagawa or Ōfuna
Preceding station	Odakyu	Following station
Sagami-Ōno towards Hakone-Yumoto, Gotemba or Katase-Enoshima	Romancecar	Shin-Yurigaoka towards Shinjuku or Kita-Senju
Sagami-Ōno towards Odawara	Odawara Line Rapid Express	Shin-Yurigaoka towards Shinjuku
Sagami-Ōno towards Odawara	Odawara Line Express	Shin-Yurigaoka towards Shinjuku or Yoyogi-Uehara
Sagami-Ōno One-way operation	Odawara Line Commuter Semi Express	Tamagawagakuen-mae towards Yoyogi-Uehara
Sagami-Ōno towards Hon-Atsugi	Odawara Line Semi Express	Tamagawagakuen-mae towards Yoyogi-Uehara
Sagami-Ōno towards Odawara	Odawara Line Local	Tamagawagakuen-mae towards Shinjuku or Yoyogi-Uehara
Location
- Location within Special wards of Tokyo Location within Tokyo Bay and Bōsō Peninsula Location within Tokyo Location within Japan

Machida Station (Japanese: 町田駅, Hepburn: Machida-eki) is an interchange railway station located in the city of Machida, Tokyo, Japan, operated by East Japan Railway Company (JR East) and Odakyu Electric Railway.

== Lines ==
Machida Station is served by the Yokohama Line from Hachiōji to Higashi-Kanagawa. The station is also served by the Odakyu Odawara Line from Shinjuku to Odawara.

== Station layout ==
JR East Machida Station has two island platforms serving four tracks, with the station building located above and perpendicular to the platforms, and has a "Midori no Madoguchi" staffed ticket office. Odakyu Machida Station also has two elevated island platforms serving four tracks, while located inside a station building containing a supermarket and department store.

=== JR Platforms ===
1,2	Yokohama Line	for Higashi-Kanagawa, Yokohama, Sakuragichō and Ōfuna
3,4	Yokohama Line	for Hashimoto, and Hachiōji

=== Odakyu Platforms ===
1-2	■ Odakyu Odawara Line	for Sagami-Ōno, Ebina and Odawara; Hakone Tozan Line for Hakone-Yumoto via Odawara; Odakyū Enoshima Line for Shonandai, Fujisawa, and Katase-Enoshima via Sagami-Ōno
3-4	■ Odakyu Odawara Line	for Kyodo, Shimo-Kitazawa, Yoyogi-Uehara, and Shinjuku; Tokyo Metro Chiyoda Line for Ōtemachi and Ayase via Yoyogi-Uehara; Joban Line (Local) for Abiko and Toride via Ayase

== History ==
The JR East station first opened as Haramachida Station (原町田駅) on 23 September 1908. The Odakyu station opened on 1 April 1927 as Shin-Haramachida Station (新原町田駅), which was renamed Machida Station on 11 April 1976, and the current station building and Odakyu Department Store opened on 23 September 1976. The JR station was moved 0.4 km (0.25 mi) towards Hachiōji and also renamed to Machida on 1 April 1980 to reduce the walking distance between it and the Odakyu station from 700 m (2,300 ft) to 300 m (980 ft), to facilitate interchange.

Station numbering was introduced to the Odakyu Line in January 2014 with Machida being assigned station number OH27. In 2016, Number assignments were introduced to the Yokohama Line platforms on 20 August of that year with those facilities being assigned station number JH23.

== Passenger statistics ==
In fiscal 2019, the JR station was used by an average of 110,899 passengers daily (boarding passengers only). During the same period, then Odakyu station was used by 289,419 passengers daily.

== Surrounding area ==
- Machida City Museum of Graphic Arts
- Machida Civic Hall
- Machida Municipal Hospital
- Sagamihara, Kanagawa

== See also ==
- List of railway stations in Japan
