= Hachiōji Station =

Railway station in Hachiōji, Tokyo, Japan

JC22 JH32 Hachiōji Station 八王子駅
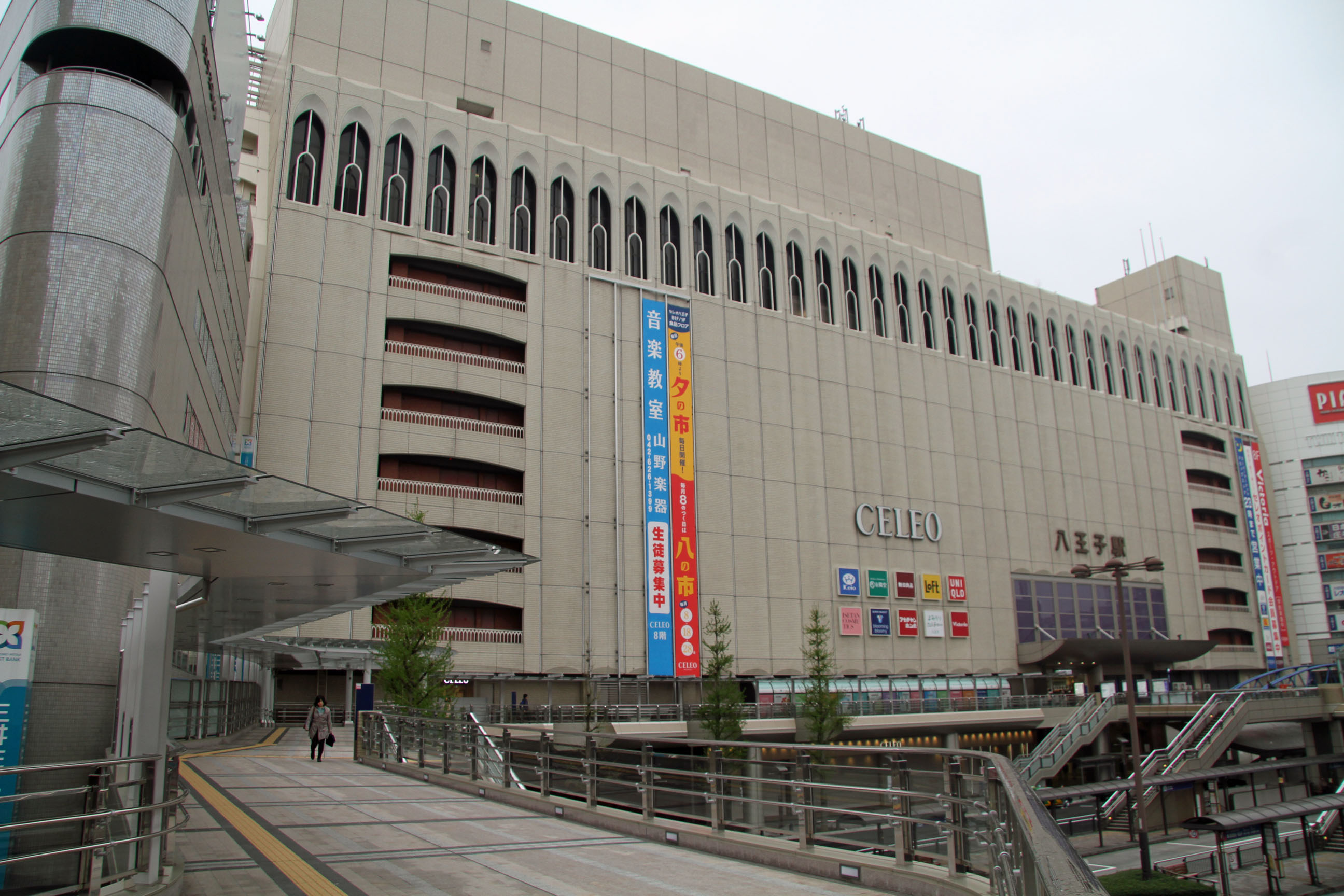
- Hachiōji Station north side, April 2014

General information
- Location: 1 Asahichō, Hachiōji City, Tokyo 192-0083; Japan
- Coordinates: 35°39′20″N 139°20′20″E
- Operator: JR East
- Lines: Chūō Main Line; Chūō Rapid Line; Yokohama Line; ■ Hachikō Line
- Distance: 37.1 km (23.1 mi) from Shinjuku
- Platforms: 3 island platforms
- Tracks: 6

Construction
- Structure type: At grade

Other information
- Status: Staffed ("Midori no Madoguchi")
- Station code: JC22; JH32
- Website: Official website

History
- Opened: 11 August 1889; 137 years ago

Passengers
- FY2024: 154,802 (daily) ▲2.49%

Services
Preceding station	JR East	Following station
Ōtsuki JC32 towards Hakuba	Azusa	Tachikawa JC19 towards Chiba or Tokyo
Ōtsuki JC32 towards Ryūō	Kaiji	Tachikawa JC19 towards Tokyo
Ōtsuki JC32 Terminus	Fuji Excursion	Tachikawa JC19 towards Shinjuku
Nishi-Hachiōji JC23 towards Shiojiri	Chūō Main Line Local	Toyoda JC21 towards Tachikawa
Takao One-way operation	Chūō Line Commuter Special Rapid	Tachikawa JC19 towards Tokyo
Nishi-Hachiōji JC23 towards Ōtsuki	Chūō Line Chūō Special Rapid	Toyoda JC21 towards Tokyo
Nishi-Hachiōji JC23 towards Ōtsuki	Chūō Line Commuter Rapid	Toyoda One-way operation
Nishi-Hachiōji JC23 towards Ōtsuki	Chūō Line Rapid	Toyoda JC21 towards Tokyo
Terminus	Musashino	Toyoda JC21 towards Ōmiya
Terminus	Yokohama Line Rapid Local	Katakura JH31 towards Higashi-Kanagawa or Ōfuna
Terminus	Hachikō Line	Kita-Hachiōji towards Komagawa
Location
- Location within Special wards of Tokyo Location within Japan

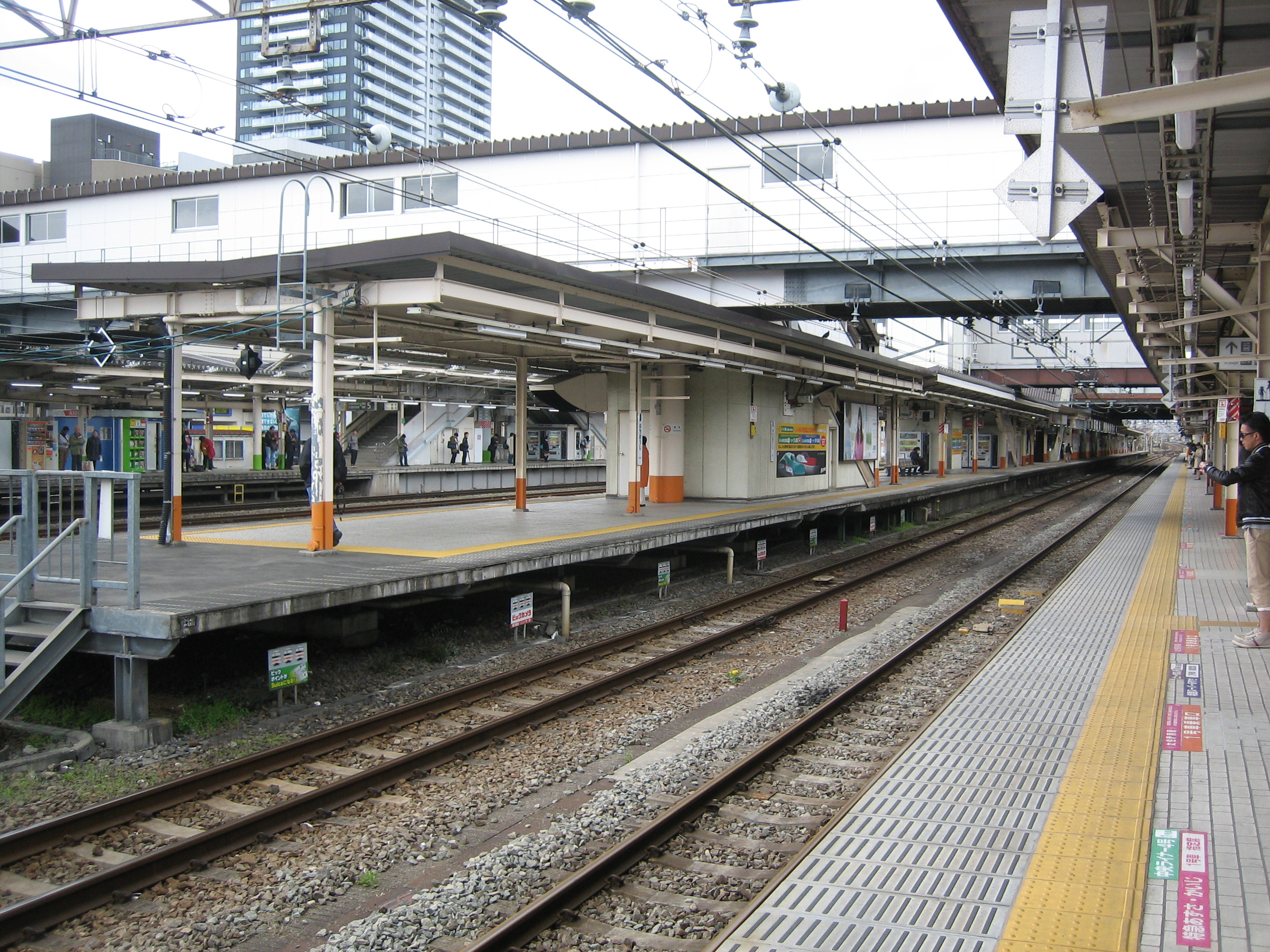
Platform of Hachiōji Station

Hachiōji Station (八王子駅, Hachiōji-eki) is a major junction passenger railway station located in the city of Hachiōji, Tokyo, Japan, operated by East Japan Railway Company (JR East). It opened on 11 August 1889.

== Lines ==
The Chūō Main Line passes through Hachiōji Station, which is 47.4 kilometers from the terminus of the line at Tokyo Station. The Yokohama Line (to Higashi-Kanagawa) and Hachikō Line (to Komagawa) terminate here.

Keiō Hachiōji Station on the Keiō Line is located about 400 metres northeast from here.

== Station layout ==
The station consists of three island platforms serving four tracks with the platforms connected the elevated station building. The station has a "Midori no Madoguchi" staffed ticket office.

=== Platforms ===
1	■ Hachikō Line	for Haijima, Komagawa, and Kawagoe ■ Kawagoe Line (via Komagawa)
2	Chūō Line (Rapid)	for Tachikawa, Shinjuku, and Tokyo
3	■	(Used by some up Chūō Line services starting at this station)
4	Chūō Main Line	for Takao, Kōfu, and Matsumoto
5, 6	Yokohama Line	for Hashimoto, Machida, Higashi-Kanagawa, Sakuragichō, and Ōfuna

== History ==
Hachiōji Station opened on 11 August 1889. With the privatization of Japanese National Railways (JNR) on 1 April 1987, the station came under the control of JR East.

Station numbering was introduced on 20 August 2016 with Hachioji being assigned station numbers JC22 for the Chuo Line and JH32 for the Yokohama Line.

== Passenger statistics ==
In fiscal 2019, the station was used by an average of 83,565 passengers daily (boarding passengers only).

The passenger figures (boarding passengers only) for previous years are as shown below.

Fiscal year	daily average
2005	80,755
2010	80,219
2015	86,178

== See also ==
- List of railway stations in Japan
