= Higashi-Kanagawa Station =

Railway station in Yokohama, Japan

JK13 JH13 Higashi-Kanagawa Station 東神奈川駅
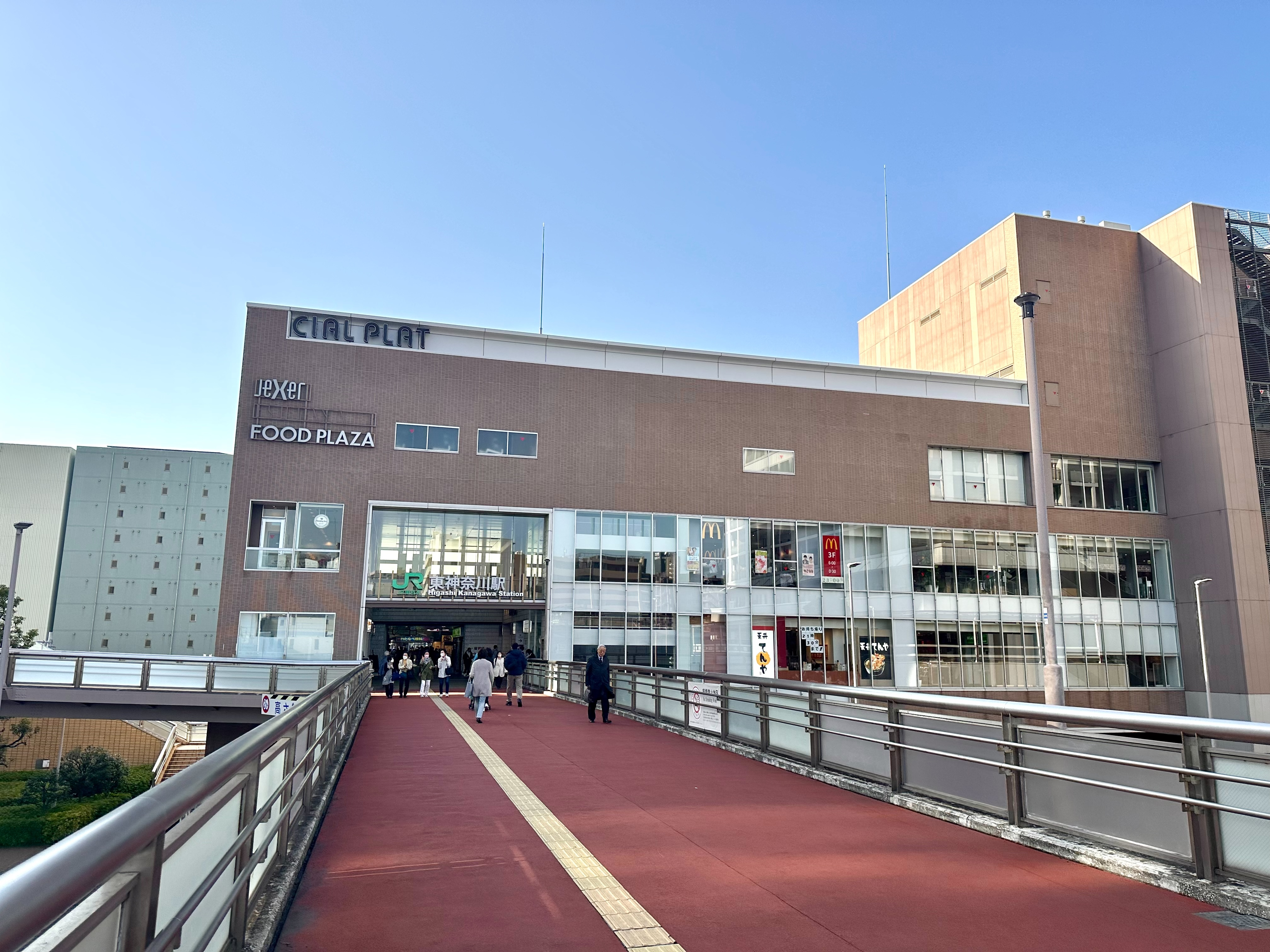
- The east side of Higashi-Kanagawa Station in March 2023

General information
- Location: 1 Higashi-Kanagawa, Kanagawa-ku, Yokohama-shi, Kanagawa-ken 221-0044; Japan
- Coordinates: 35°28′41″N 139°38′00″E
- Operator: JR East
- Lines: Keihin-Tōhoku Line; Yokohama Line
- Distance: 57.2 km from Ōmiya
- Platforms: 2 island platforms
- Tracks: 8
- Connections: Keikyū Higashi-kanagawa Station (Keikyu); Bus stop

Other information
- Status: Staffed (Midori no Madoguchi)
- Station code: JK13
- Website: Official website

History
- Opened: 23 September 1908; 117 years ago

Passengers
- FY2019: 37,577 daily

Services
Preceding station	JR East	Following station
Yokohama Terminus	Keihin–Tōhoku Line Rapid Local	Shin-Koyasu JK14 towards Ōmiya
Yokohama towards Ōfuna	Yokohama Line Rapid	Kikuna JH15 towards Hachiōji
Yokohama towards Ōfuna	Yokohama Line Local	Ōguchi JH14 towards Hachiōji
Location
- Location within Kanagawa Prefecture Location within Japan

Higashi-Kanagawa Station (東神奈川駅, Higashi-Kanagawa-eki) is a junction passenger railway station located in Kanagawa-ku, Yokohama, Japan, operated by East Japan Railway Company (JR East).

== Lines ==
Higashi-Kanagawa Station is served by the Keihin-Tōhoku Line and Yokohama Line. It is 57.2 kilometers (35.5 mi) from the terminus of the Keihin-Tōhoku Line at Ōmiya, and forms the southern terminal station for the 42.6-kilometer (26.5 mi) Yokohama Line.

== Station layout ==
The station has two ground-level island platforms serving four tracks, connected to the station building by a footbridge. Although the Tōkaidō Main Line and Yokosuka Line tracks run parallel to the station, neither line stops at Higashi-Kanagawa. The station has a Midori no Madoguchi staffed ticket office.

=== Platforms ===
1	Keihin-Tōhoku Line	for Yokohama, Isogo, and Ōfuna
2	Keihin-Tōhoku Line	for Yokohama, Isogo, and Ōfuna
2	Yokohama Line	for Shin-Yokohama, Machida, and Hachiōji
3	Yokohama Line	for Shin-Yokohama, Machida, and Hachiōji
4	Keihin-Tōhoku Line	for Kawasaki , Shinagawa, Tokyo, and Ōmiya
4	Yokohama Line	for Shin-Yokohama, Machida, and Hachiōji

From 15 September 2013, new LED lighting was installed on the platforms. This lighting switches between light blue and light green to indicate whether individual departing trains are Keihin-Tohoku Line or Yokohama Line services.

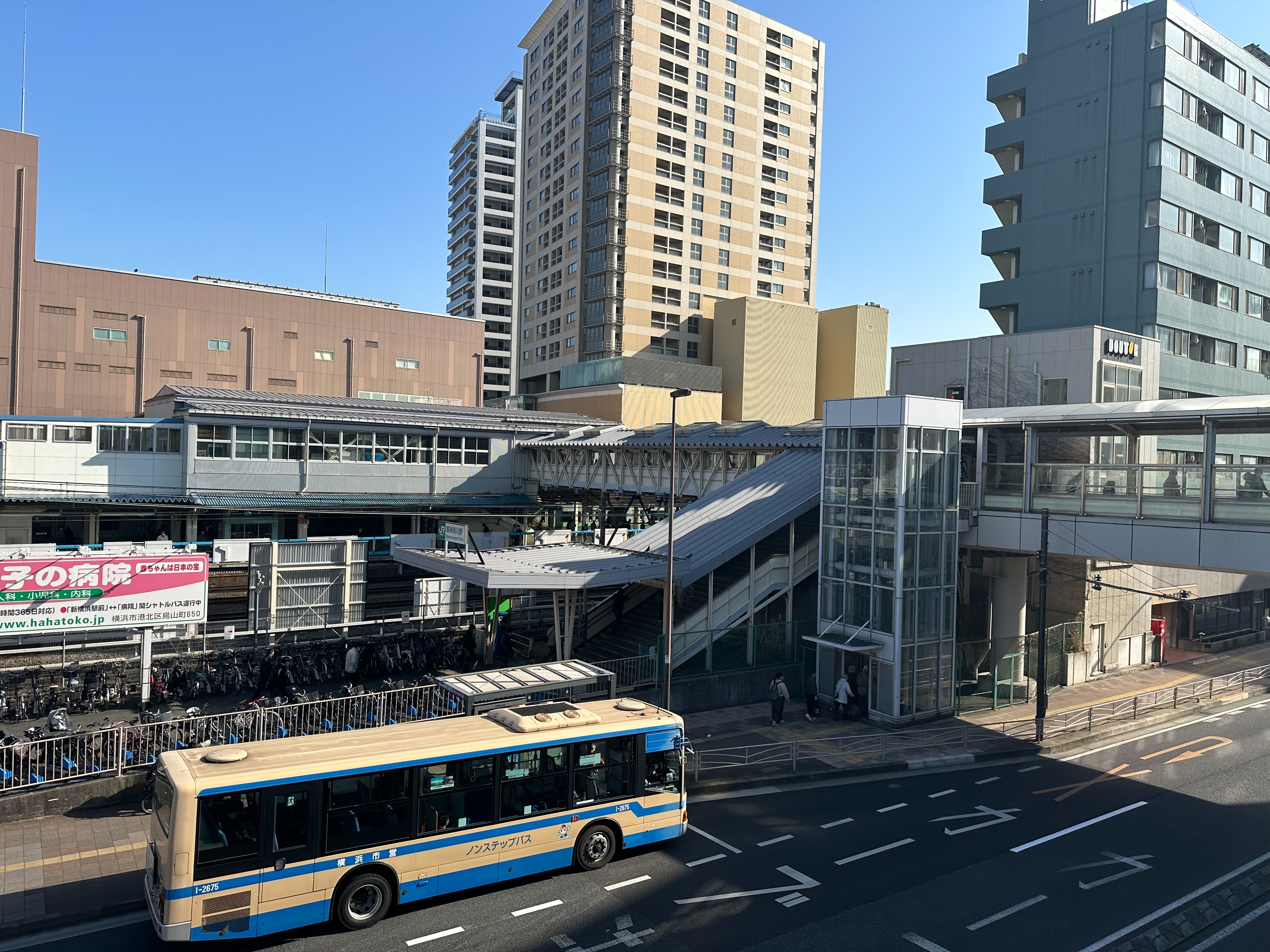
The west side of the station in March 2023

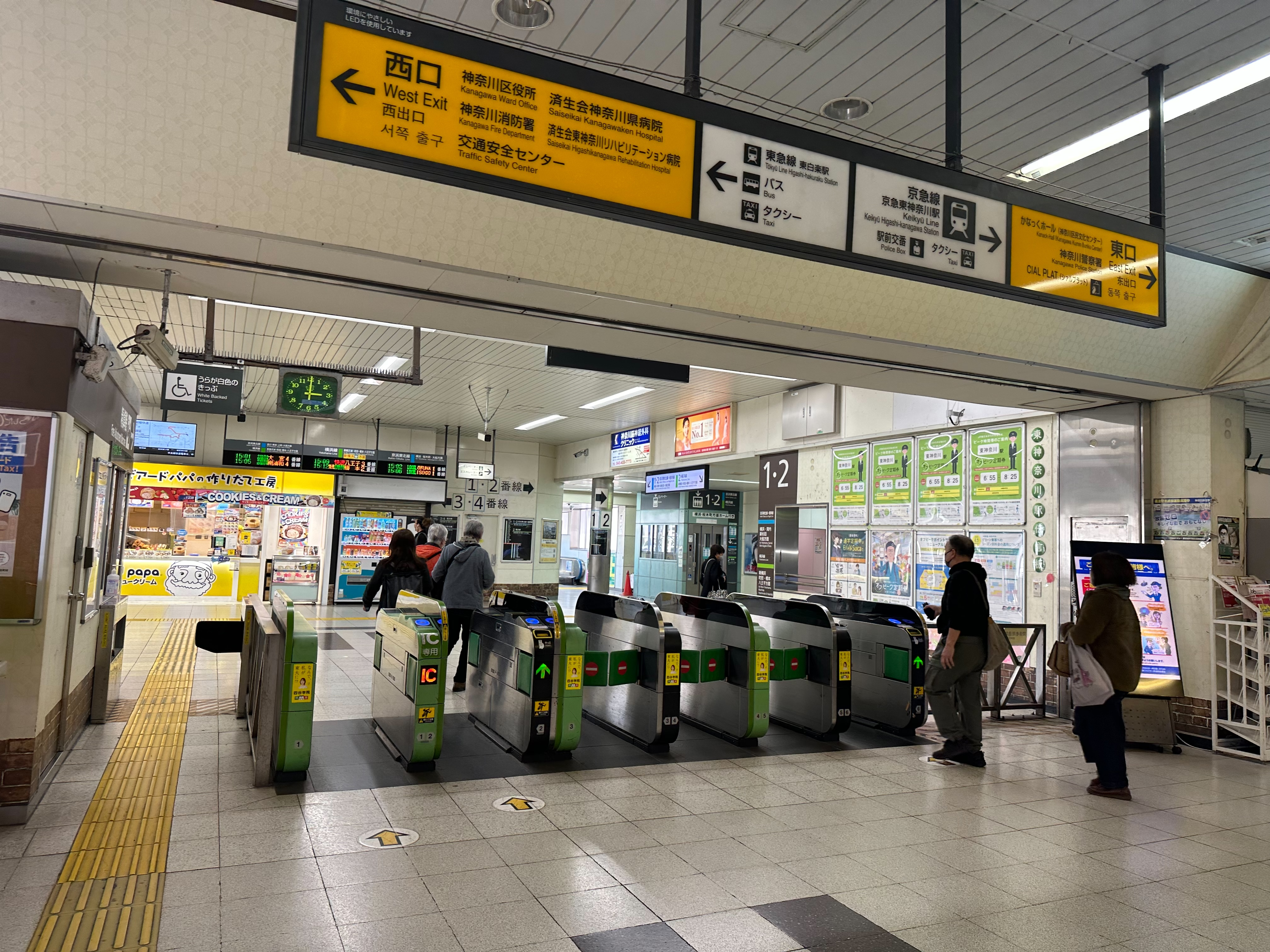
The ticket barriers in March 2023

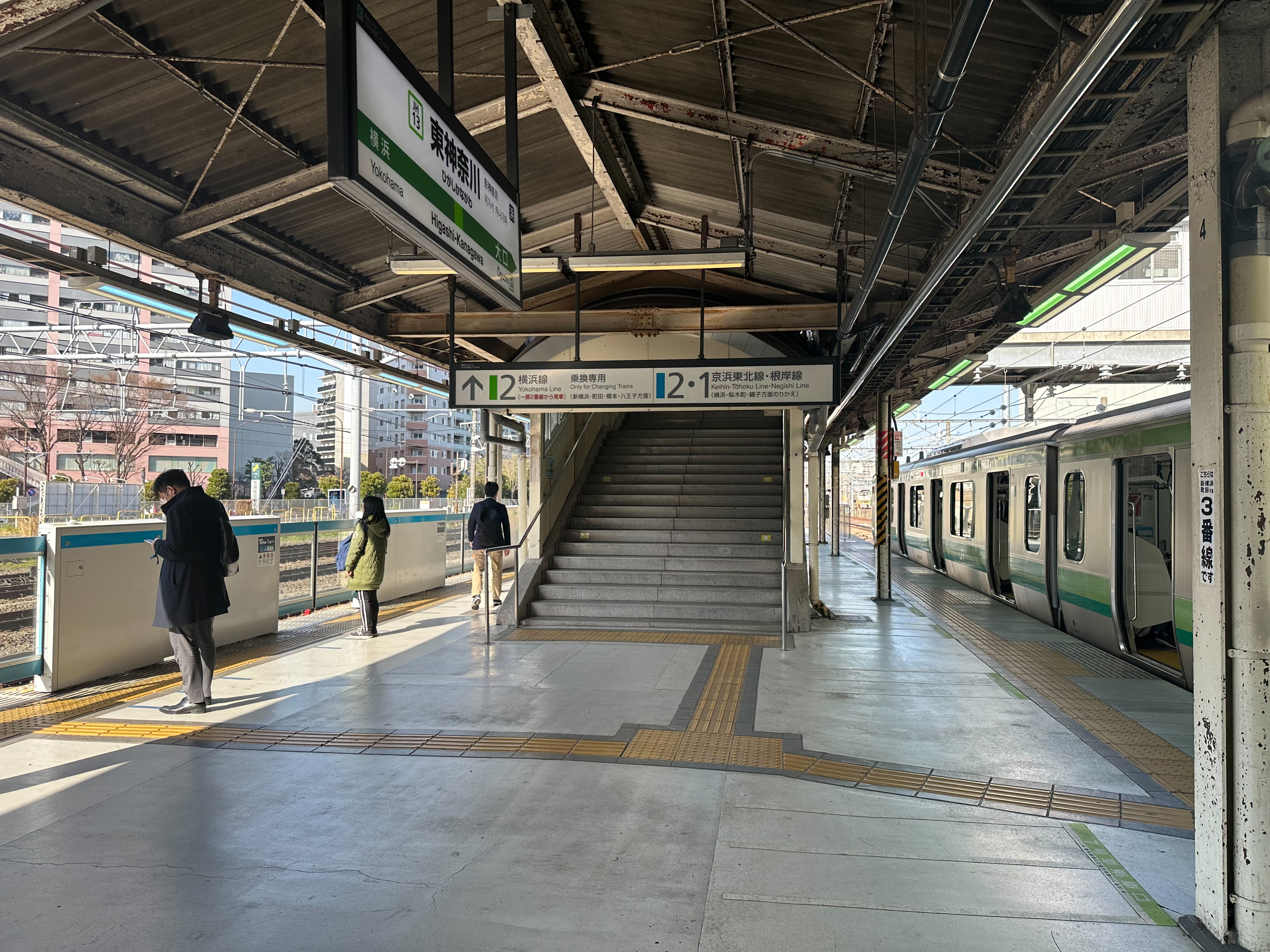
The northbound platforms 3 and 4 in March 2023

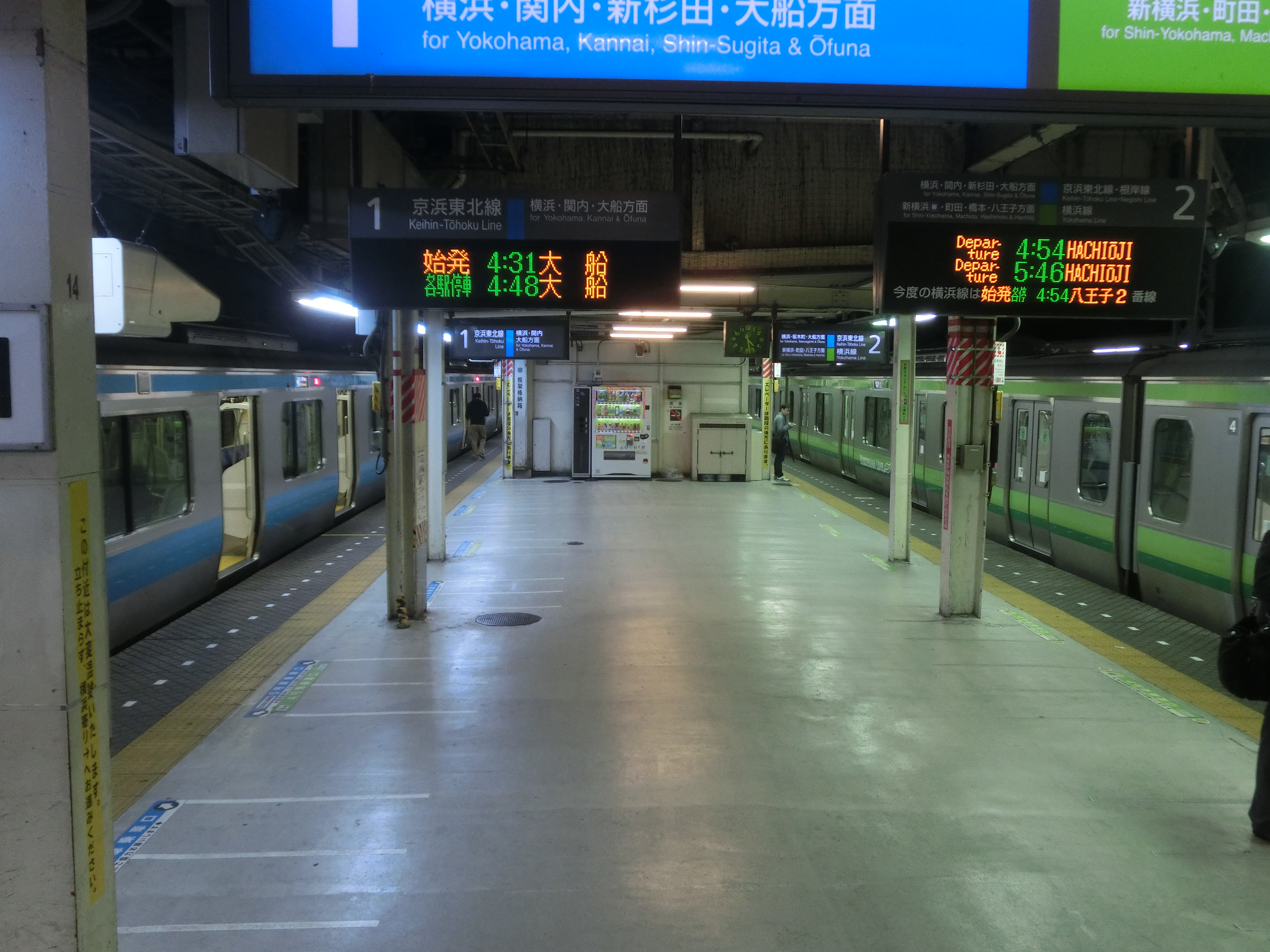
The down platforms in April 2016 showing the LED lighting

== History ==
Higashi-Kanagawa Station opened on 23 September 1908, as a joint use station on the Japanese Government Railways (JGR) Tōkaidō Main Line (the predecessor to JNR) and the privately owned Yokohama Railway Line (which connected Yokohama Station with Hachiōji Station. A spur line for freight operations to Umikanagawa Station (closed in 1959) was established on December 10, 1911. The Keihin Electric Train (the forerunner to the Keihin-Tōhoku Line) began operations from Higashi-Kanagawa from December 20, 1914. The Yokohama Railway Line was nationalized on 1 October 1917. With the privatization of JNR on 1 April 1987, the station came under the operational control of JR East.

Station numbering was introduced on 20 August 2016 with Higashi-Kanagawa being assigned station number JK13 for the Keihin-Tohoku Line and JH13 for the Yokohama Line.

== Passenger statistics ==
In fiscal 2019, the station was used by an average of 37,577 passengers daily (boarding passengers only).

The daily average passenger figures (boarding passengers only) for previous years are as shown below.

Fiscal year	Daily average
2000	23,980
2005	28,751
2010	30,965
2015	35,304

== Surrounding area ==
- Keikyū Higashi-kanagawa Station (connected by a pedestrian deck)
- Kanagawa Ward Office

== See also ==
- List of railway stations in Japan
