= List of mergers in Kanagawa Prefecture =

Here is a list of mergers in Kanagawa Prefecture, Japan since the Heisei era.

== Mergers from April 1, 1999 to Present ==
- On March 20, 2006 - the towns of Sagamiko and Tsukui (both from Tsukui District) were merged into the expanded city of Sagamihara.
- On March 11, 2007 - the towns of Fujino and Shiroyama (both from Tsukui District) were also merged into the expanded city of Sagamihara. Tsukui District was dissolved as a result of this merger.
