= Kanagawa 14th district =

- Parliamentary constituency for the Japanese House of Representatives
- Numbered map of the Kanagawa Prefecture single seats
- Prefecture: Kanagawa
- Proportional District: Southern Kanto
- Electorate: 403,435

Current constituency
- Created: 1994
- Seats: One
- Party: LDP
- Representatives: Jiro Akama
- Municipalities: Chūō-ku and Midori-ku of Sagamihara, District of Aikō

Kanagawa 14th district (神奈川県第14区, Kanagawa-ken dai-ju-yonku or simply 神奈川14区, Kanagawa-ju-yonku) is a single-member constituency of the House of Representatives in the national Diet of Japan located in Kanagawa Prefecture.

== Areas covered ==
=== Since 2022 ===
- Sagamihara
  - Chūō-ku
  - Midori-ku
- Aikō District

=== 2017 - 2022 ===
- Sagamihara
  - Chūō-ku
  - Part of Midori-ku
  - Part of Minami-ku

=== 2013 - 2017 ===
- Sagamihara
  - Chūō-ku
  - Part of Midori-ku
  - Part of Minami-ku

=== 2002 - 2013 ===
- Part of Sagamihara

=== 1994 - 2002 ===
- Sagamihara

== List of representatives ==
Election	Representative	Party	Notes
1996	Hirohisa Fujii	New Frontier	
2000	Hirohisa Fujii	Liberal	
2003	Hirohisa Fujii	Democratic	
2005	Jiro Akama	LDP	
2009	Kentaro Motomura	Democratic	
2012	Jiro Akama	LDP	
2014	Jiro Akama	LDP	
2017	Jiro Akama	LDP	
2021	Jiro Akama	LDP	
2024	Jiro Akama	LDP	
2026	Jiro Akama	LDP	

== Election results ==
=== 2026 ===
2026
Party	Candidate	Votes	%	±%
LDP	Jiro Akama (Incumbent)	108,352	52.5	▲12.87
Centrist Reform	Yoshihiro Nagatomo	61,720	29.9	▼6.23
Sanseitō	Hitoshi Sakioki	24,256	11.8	▲4.46
JCP	Kei Nakamura	12,083	5.9	▼1.38
Majority		46,632	22.6	▲19.1
Registered electors		400,562		
Turnout		206,411	52.49	▼0.01
LDP hold				

=== 2024 ===
2024
Party	Candidate	Votes	%	±%
LDP	Jiro Akama (Incumbent)	81,428	39.63	▼14.13
CDP	Yoshihiro Nagatomo (Won PR seat)	74,238	36.13	▼10.11
Ishin	Takanori Kumasaka	19,764	9.62	New
Sanseitō	Hitoshi Sakioki	15,090	7.34	New
JCP	Kei Nakamura	14,930	7.28	N/A
Majority		7,190	3.50	
Registered electors		402,213		
Turnout			52.50	▼3.52
LDP hold				

=== 2021 ===
2021
Party	Candidate	Votes	%	±%
LDP	Jiro Akama (Incumbent)	135,197	53.76	▲7.28
CDP	Yoshihiro Nagatomo	116,273	46.24	New
Majority		18,924	7.52	
Registered electors		460,744		
Turnout			56.02	▲4.39
LDP hold				

=== 2017 ===
2017
Party	Candidate	Votes	%	±%
LDP	Jiro Akama (Incumbent)	105,953	46.48	▼0.74
Kibō no Tō	Kentaro Motomura (Won PR seat)	94,348	41.39	New
JCP	Jun Nakanowatari	27,640	12.13	▲2.32
Majority		11,605	5.09	
Registered electors		453,812		
Turnout			51.63	▼2.20
LDP hold				

=== 2014 ===
2014
Party	Candidate	Votes	%	±%
LDP	Jiro Akama (Incumbent)	109,408	47.22	▲7.57
Democratic	Kentaro Motomura (Won PR seat)	83,485	36.03	▲10.06
JCP	Jun Nakanowatari	22,720	9.81	▲4.07
Future Generations	Taei Nakamoto	16,091	6.94	New
Majority		25,923	11.19	
Registered electors		443,923		
Turnout			53.83	▼5.53
LDP hold				

=== 2012 ===
2012
Party	Candidate	Votes	%	±%
LDP	Jiro Akama	100,494	39.65	▲2.88
Democratic	Kentaro Motomura (Incumbent)	65,832	25.97	▼29.43
Restoration	Taei Nakamoto	39,141	15.44	New
Your	Masatake Matsumoto	27,153	10.71	New
JCP	Yuri Inomata	14,549	5.74	▼0.53
Social Democratic	Tatsuya Imai	6,306	2.49	N/A
Majority		34,662	13.68	
Registered electors				
Turnout			59.36	
LDP gain from Democratic				

=== 2009 ===
2009
Party	Candidate	Votes	%	±%
Democratic	Kentaro Motomura	157,644	55.40	▲15.01
LDP	Jiro Akama (Incumbent)	104,631	36.77	▼14.18
JCP	Tomoko Akama	17,844	6.27	▼2.39
Happiness Realization	Masashi Ishikawa	2,713	0.95	New
Independent	Takanori Yoshida	1,737	0.61	New
Majority		53,013	18.63	
Registered electors				
Turnout				
Democratic gain from LDP				

=== 2005 ===
2005
Party	Candidate	Votes	%	±%
LDP	Jiro Akama	135,719	50.95	▲14.20
Democratic	Hirohisa Fujii (Incumbent)	107,608	40.39	▼3.29
JCP	Masaaki Fujiwara	23,064	8.66	▲1.96
Majority		28,111	10.56	
Registered electors				
Turnout				
LDP gain from Democratic				

=== 2003 ===
2003
Party	Candidate	Votes	%	±%
Democratic	Hirohisa Fujii (Incumbent)	97,214	43.68	▼4.97
LDP	Taei Nakamoto	81,794	36.75	▲10.37
Social Democratic	Yōko Hara	26,508	11.91	▼2.95
JCP	Masaaki Fujiwara	14,915	6.70	▼3.41
Independent	Kazuo Minoura	2,134	0.96	New
Majority		15,420	6.93	
Registered electors				
Turnout				
Democratic hold				

=== 2000 ===
2000
Party	Candidate	Votes	%	±%
Liberal	Hirohisa Fujii (Incumbent)	71,365	26.82	New
LDP	Taei Nakamoto (Won PR seat)	70,195	26.38	▲3.01
Democratic	Keiko Hakariya	58,088	21.83	New
Social Democratic	Yōko Hara (Won PR seat)	39,549	14.86	New
JCP	Takako Okude	26,894	10.11	▼4.88
Majority		1,170	0.44	
Registered electors				
Turnout				
Liberal hold				

=== 1996 ===
1996
Party	Candidate	Votes	%	±%
New Frontier	Hirohisa Fujii	83,010	36.90	New
LDP	Taei Nakamoto	52,567	23.37	New
Democratic	Takeshi Suzuki	51,597	22.94	New
JCP	Shin Shiga	33,722	14.99	New
Liberal League	Yasunobu Koike	4,038	1.80	New
Majority		30,443	13.53	
Registered electors				
Turnout				
New Frontier win (new seat)				
