= Kamimizo Station =

Railway station in Sagamihara, Kanagawa Prefecture, Japan

Kamimizo Station 上溝駅
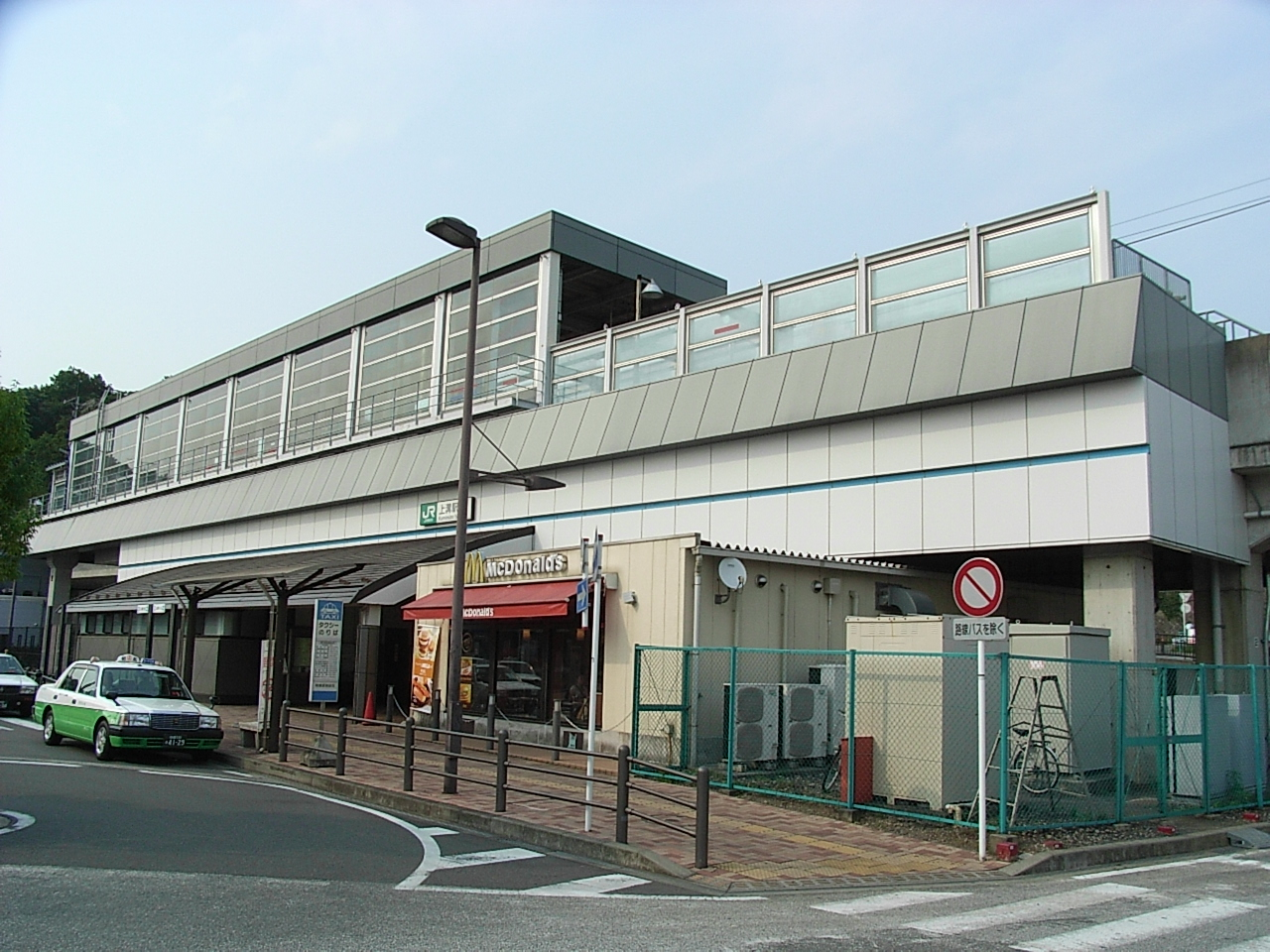
- Kamimizo Station, June 2009

General information
- Location: 7-19 Kamimizo, Chuo-ku, Sagamihara-shi, Kanagawa-ken 252-0243; Japan
- Coordinates: 35.557782°N 139.363251°E
- Operator: JR East
- Line: ■ Sagami Line
- Distance: 26.9 km from Chigasaki.
- Platforms: 1 side platform
- Connections: Bus stop

Other information
- Status: Staffed
- Website: Official website

History
- Opened: April 29, 1931
- Former names: Sagami-Yokoyama; Hon-Kamimizo (until 1944)

Passengers
- FY2019: 6,341 daily (boarding passengers)

Services
Preceding station	JR East	Following station
Minami-Hashimoto towards Hachiōji	Sagami Line	Banda towards Chigasaki
Location
- Location within Kanagawa Prefecture Location within Japan

Kamimizo Station (上溝駅, Kamimizo-eki) is a passenger railway station located in the city of Sagamihara, Kanagawa Prefecture, Japan, operated by the East Japan Railway Company (JR East).

== Lines ==
Kamimizo Station is served by the Sagami Line, and is located 26.9 kilometers from the terminus of the line at Chigasaki.

== Station layout ==
Kamimizo has a single side platform facing one track. The track is elevated above ground level, and the station building lies below the track. Directly operated by the railway company, the station features a staffed ticket-service window. It also has machines for selling and collecting tickets, and for fare adjustment. Additional facilities include an elevator, an escalator, a multipurpose toilet, beverage vending machines, and public telephones. Kamimizo also has a bus center. Kanagawa Chuo Kotsu operates buses that stop at the station's six bus platforms.

== History ==
Kamimizo Station was scheduled to be opened as a station on the Sagami Railway in June 1927, but work was suspended due to lack of funds. On April 29, 1931, the Sagami Line was extended from Atsugi to Hashimoto, at which time the station was finally completed as Sagami-Yokoyama Station (相模横山駅, Sagami-Yokoyama-eki). On November 7, 1935, the station name was changed to Hon-Kamimizo (本上溝, Honkamimizo-eki). On June 1, 1944, the Sagami Railway was nationalized and merged with the Japan National Railways, at which time the station received its current name. Scheduled freight services were discontinued from 1962. On April 1, 1987, with the dissolution and privatization of the Japan National Railways, the station came under the operation of JR East. The station building was complexly rebuilt in 1991. Automated turnstiles using the Suica IC card system came into operation from November 2001.

== Passenger statistics ==
In fiscal 2019, the station was used by an average of 6,341 passengers daily (boarding passengers only).

The passenger figures (boarding passengers only) for previous years are as shown below.

Fiscal year	daily average
2005	5,130
2010	5,530
2015	5,882

== Surrounding area ==
The station serves traffic to four schools. They are Kamimizo Middle School (operated by the city) and three prefectural high schools: Kamimizo, Sagamitana and Sagamihara. Also nearby are a Daiei supermarket and a swimming pool, which the U.S. team used to practice for the 2006 FINA Synchronised Swimming World Cup (hosted in Yokohama).

== See also ==
- List of railway stations in Japan
