= Hachiōji-Minamino Station =

Railway station in Hachiōji, Tokyo, Japan

JH30 Hachiōjiminamino Station 八王子みなみ野駅
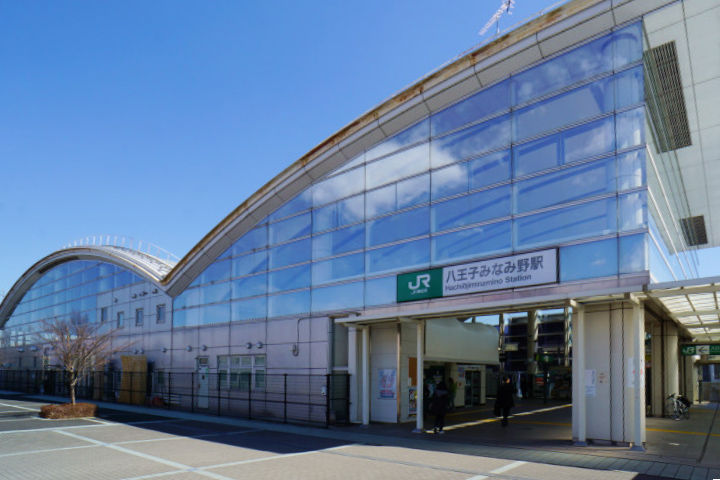
- Hachiōjiminamino Station west entrance in March 2017

General information
- Location: 1-1-1 Minamino, Hachiōji-shi, Tokyo 192-0916; Japan
- Coordinates: 35°37′52.9″N 139°19′51.5″E
- Operator: JR East
- Line: Yokohama Line
- Distance: 38.6 km from Higashi-Kanagawa
- Platforms: 1 island platform
- Tracks: 2

Other information
- Status: Staffed ("Midori no Madoguchi")
- Station code: JH30
- Website: Official website

History
- Opened: 1 April 1997

Passengers
- FY2019: 18,695 daily

Services
Preceding station	JR East	Following station
Katakura JH31 towards Hachiōji	Yokohama Line Rapid Local	Aihara JH29 towards Higashi-Kanagawa or Ōfuna
Location
- Location within Tokyo Location within Japan

Hachiōjiminamino Station (八王子みなみ野駅, Hachiōji-minamino-eki) is a passenger railway station located in the city of Hachiōji, Tokyo, Japan, operated by the East Japan Railway Company (JR East).

== Lines ==
Hachiōjiminamino Station is served by the Yokohama Line from Hachiōji to Higashi-Kanagawa, and is located 4.0 km from the northern terminus of the line at Hachiōji.

== Station layout ==
The station consists of a single island platform serving two tracks, with an elevated station building. The station has a "Midori no Madoguchi" staffed ticket office.

=== Platforms ===
1	Yokohama Line	for Hachiōji
2	Yokohama Line	for Machida, Higashi-Kanagawa, Yokohama, Sakuragichō and Ōfuna

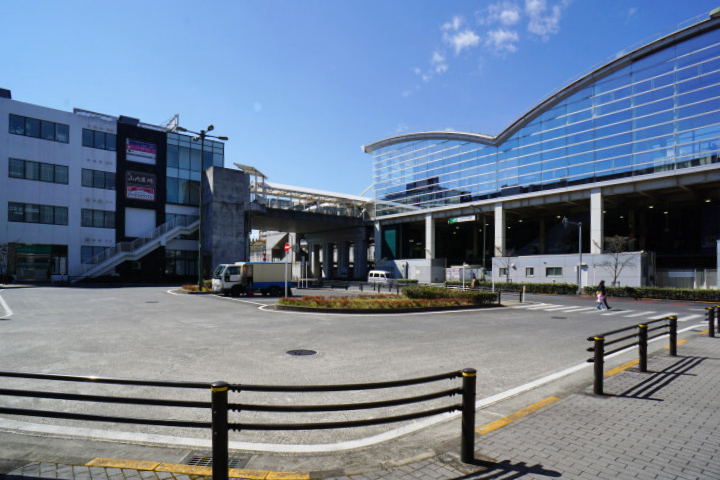
The east side of the station in March 2017

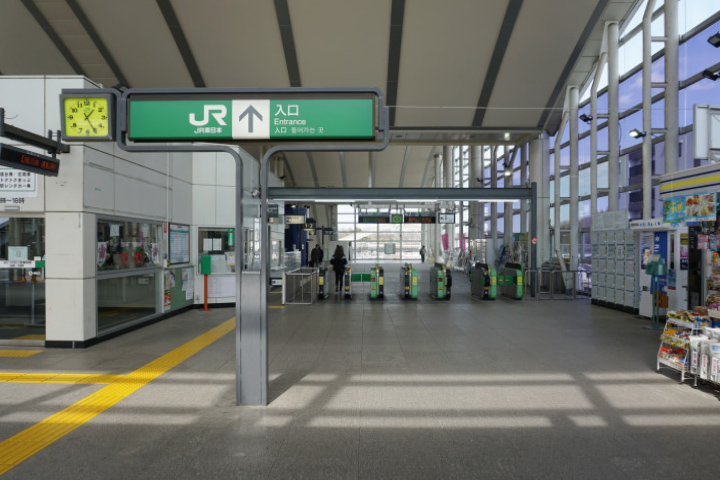
The ticket barriers in March 2017

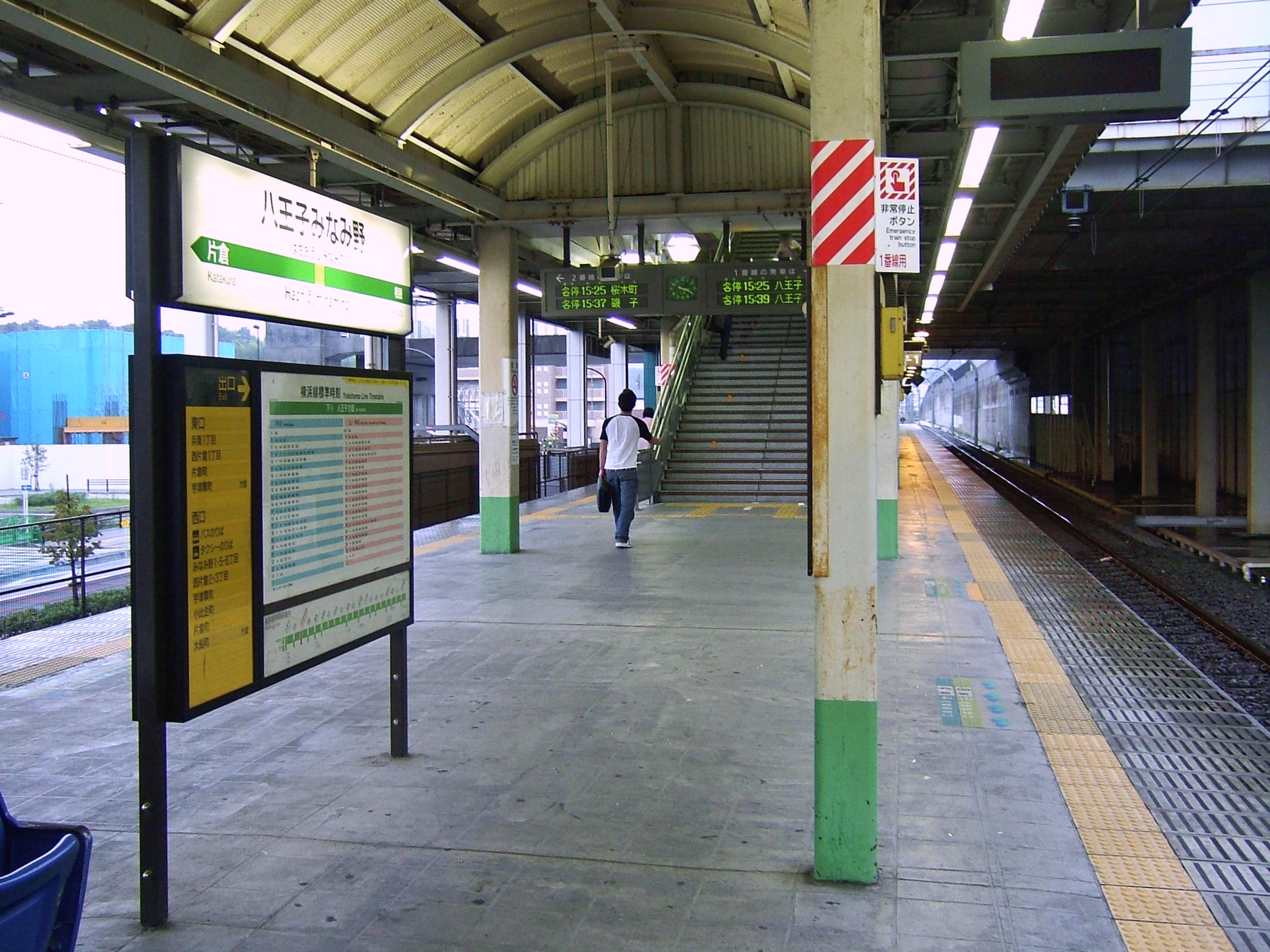
The platform in August 2008

== History ==
The station opened on 1 April 1997.

Station numbering was introduced on 20 August 2016 with Hachiōjiminamino being assigned station number JH30.

== Passenger statistics ==
In fiscal 2019, the station was used by an average of 18,695 passengers daily (boarding passengers only).

The passenger figures (boarding passengers only) for previous years are as shown below.

Fiscal year	daily average
2005	15,671
2010	19,200
2015	17,960

== Surrounding area ==
- Nihon Bunka University
- Tokyo University of Technology
- Yamano College of Aesthetics
- Nippon Engineering College of Hachioji
- Katakura High School
- Hino Auto Plaza museum

== See also ==
- List of railway stations in Japan
