= Keiō-horinouchi Station =

Railway station in Hachiōji, Tokyo, Japan

Keio-horinouchi Station 京王堀之内駅

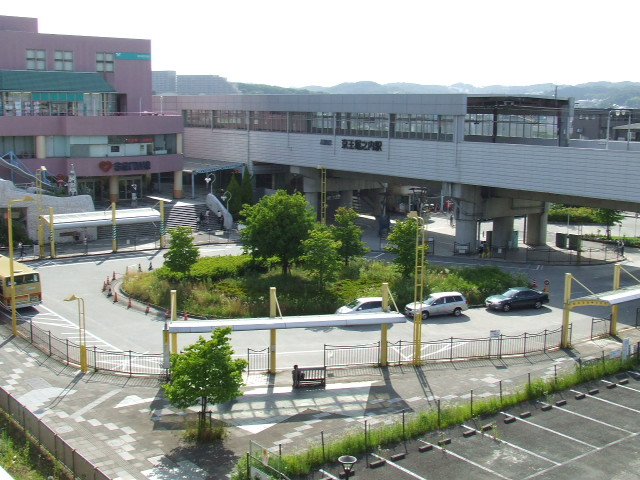
- Keio-Horinouchi Station building, June 2007

General information
- Location: 3-24-4 Horinouchi, Hachiōji-shi, Tokyo 192-0355; Japan
- Coordinates: 35°37′28″N 139°24′01″E
- Operator: Keio Corporation
- Line: Keio Sagamihara Line
- Distance: 31.5 km from Shinjuku
- Platforms: 2 side platforms
- Tracks: 2
- Connections: Bus terminal

Other information
- Station code: KO42
- Website: Official website

History
- Opened: 21 May 1988

Passengers
- FY2019: 32,280

Services
Preceding station	Keio Corporation	Following station
Minami-ōsawa towards Hashimoto	Sagamihara Line Semi Express Rapid Local	Keiō-tama-center towards Chōfu
Location
- Location within Tokyo Location within Japan

Keio-Horinouchi Station (京王堀之内駅, Keiō-Horinouchi-eki) is a passenger railway station located in the city of Hachiōji, Tokyo, Japan, operated by the private railway operator Keio Corporation.

== Lines ==
Keio-Horinouchi Station is served by the Keio Sagamihara Line between Chōfu in Tokyo and Hashimoto in Kanagawa Prefecture. It is located 16.0 kilometers from the terminus of the line at Chōfu Station and 31.5 kilometers from Shinjuku Station. Semi Express, Rapid, and Local services stop at this station.

== Station layout ==
The station consists of two elevated opposed side platforms serving two tracks. The station building and combined shopping center is located underneath and to the side of the tracks.

=== Platforms ===
1	■ Keio Sagamihara Line	for Hashimoto
2	■ Keio Sagamihara Line	for Chōfu and Shinjuku

== History ==
Keio-Horinouchi Station opened on 21 May 1988.

== Passenger statistics ==
In fiscal 2019, the station was used by an average of 32,280 passengers daily.

The passenger figures (boarding passengers only) for previous years are as shown below.

Fiscal year	daily average
2005	26,251
2010	29,459
2015	32,047
