= Sagamiko =

Sagamiko or Sagami-ko may refer to:

- Lake Sagami (Sagami-ko in Japanese) in Kanagawa Prefecture, Japan
- Sagamiko, Kanagawa, a former municipality in Kanagawa Prefecture, Japan
