= Fujino, Kanagawa =

Fujino 藤野町
- Former municipality
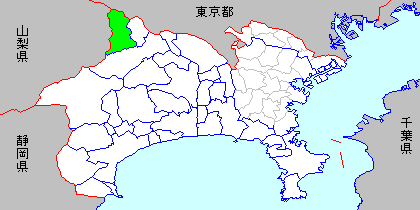
- Location of Fujino in Kanagawa Prefecture

- Location in Japan
- Coordinates: 35.606°N 139.143°E
- Country: Japan
- Region: Kantō
- Prefecture: Kanagawa Prefecture
- District: Tsukui
- Merged: March 11, 2007 (now part of Sagamihara)

Area
  - Total: 64.91 km^{2} (25.06 sq mi)

Population (March 1, 2007)
  - Total: 10,720
  - Density: 165.15/km^{2} (427.7/sq mi)
- Time zone: UTC+09:00 (JST)
- Symbols
- Bird: Crested kingfisher
- Flower: Wisteria
- Tree: Daimyo oak

Fujino (藤野町, Fujino-chō) was a town located in Tsukui District, Kanagawa Prefecture, Japan.

As of March 1, 2007, final population data before the amalgamation, the town had an estimated population of 10,720 and a density of 165.15 persons per km^{2}. The total area was 64.91 km^{2}.

On March 11, 2007, Fujino, along with the town of Shiroyama (also from Tsukui District), was merged into the expanded city of Sagamihara, and thus no longer exists as an independent municipality. It is now part of Midori-ku, Sagamihara.
