= Yoshiro Hayashi (politician) =

Japanese politician (1917–2017)

- 林 義郎

Minister of Finance
- In office 12 December 1992 – 9 August 1993
- Prime Minister: Kiichi Miyazawa
- Preceded by: Tsutomu Hata
- Succeeded by: Hirohisa Fujii

Minister of Health and Welfare
- In office 27 November 1982 – 27 December 1983
- Prime Minister: Zenkō Suzuki Yasuhiro Nakasone
- Preceded by: Motoharu Morishita
- Succeeded by: Kozo Watanabe

Member of the House of Representatives
- In office 29 December 1969 – 10 October 2003
- Preceded by: Hideo Sutō
- Succeeded by: Multi-member district
- Constituency: Yamaguchi 1st (1969–1996); Chūgoku PR (1996–2003)

Personal details
- Born: 16 June 1927 Shimonoseki, Yamaguchi, Japan
- Died: 3 February 2017 (aged 89) Tokyo, Japan
- Party: Liberal Democratic
- Spouse: Mariko Hayashi
- Children: 4, including Yoshimasa
- Relatives: Katsusada Hirose (brother-in-law); Ken Hirose (nephew)
- Education: University of Tokyo

Yoshiro Hayashi (林 義郎, Hayashi Yoshirō; 16 June 1927 – 3 February 2017) was a Japanese politician who was Minister of Finance from 1992 to 1993 and Minister of Health and Welfare from 1982 to 1983. He was elected ten times as a member of the House of Representatives since 1969.

== Early life and education ==
Hayashi was born in 1927 and was from Shimonoseki in Yamaguchi Prefecture. His grandfather was a member of the House of Peers before World War II.

Hayashi graduated from the University of Tokyo in 1950.

== Political career ==
Hayashi was a member of the Liberal Democratic Party (LDP). He served in the House of Representatives, first elected in 1969. He served as Minister of Health and Welfare. In August 1989, Hayashi joined Shintaro Ishihara and Toshiki Kaifu to ran for the presidency of the LDP, but lost to Kaifu, who won the election as prime minister, replacing Sosuke Uno in the post.

As of 1990, Hayashi was part of the faction led by Kiichi Miyazawa within the LDP. He was appointed finance minister in the cabinet led by Prime Minister Miyazawa on 12 December 1992. Hayashi replaced Tsutomu Hata in the post. Hayashi's tenure ended on 9 August 1993 when Hirohisa Fujii became finance minister. Then he began to serve as the chairman of the Diet Members League for Sino-Japanese relations. As of 1998 he served as a special envoy of Prime Minister Ryutaro Hashimoto.

In 2003 Hayashi ended his involvement in politics after serving in the House of Representatives ten times.

== Personal life and death ==
Hayashi married to Mariko Tawarada, a daughter of UBE Corporation founder Akira Tawarada. The couple have two daughters and two sons. His eldest son, Yoshimasa, is also a Japanese politician and has held different cabinet posts.

Hayashi died from multiple organ failure in Tokyo hospital on 3 February 2017 at the age of 89.
