= Jiro Akama =

Japanese politician (born 1968)

- 赤間 二郎
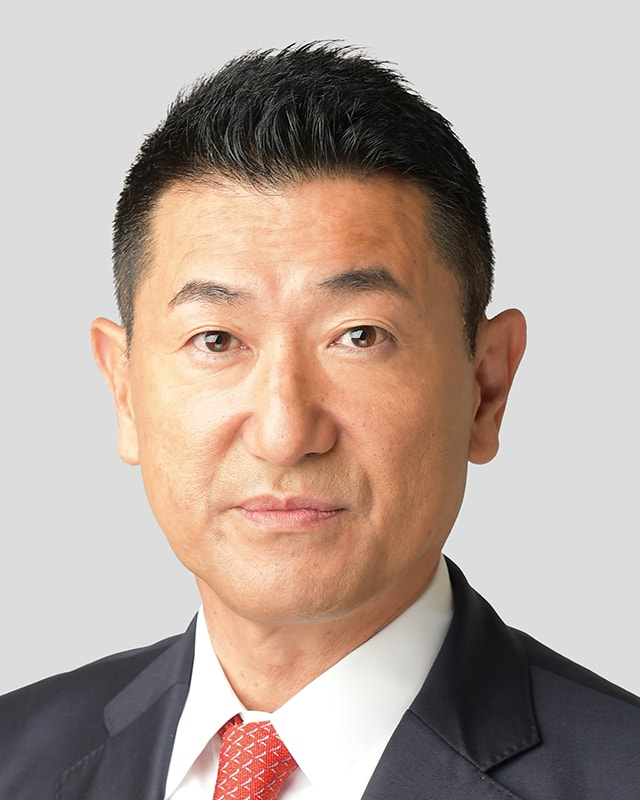
- Official portrait, 2024

Chairman of the National Public Safety Commission
- In office 21 October 2025 – 17 September 2026
- Prime Minister: Sanae Takaichi
- Preceded by: Manabu Sakai
- Succeeded by: Yasuhiro Hanashi

Member of the House of Representatives
- Incumbent
- Assumed office 16 December 2012
- Preceded by: Kentaro Motomura
- Constituency: Kanagawa 14th
- In office 11 September 2005 – 30 August 2009
- Preceded by: Hirohisa Fujii
- Succeeded by: Kentaro Motomura
- Constituency: Kanagawa 14th

Member of the Kanagawa Prefectural Assembly
- In office 11 April 1999 – 11 September 2005
- Constituency: Sagamihara City

Personal details
- Born: 27 March 1968 (age 58) Sagamihara, Kanagawa, Japan
- Party: Liberal Democratic (Shikōkai)
- Spouse: Mamiko Akama
- Children: 3
- Education: Rikkyo University (BEc); University of Manchester (MSc, Economic Sociology)

Jiro Akama (赤間 二郎, Akama Jirō; born 27 March 1968) is a Japanese politician of the Liberal Democratic Party, a member of the House of Representatives in the Diet (national legislature). He is the Senior Vice Minister of Internal Affairs and Communications. A native of Sagamihara, Kanagawa, he graduated from Rikkyo University and received his master's degree in economic sociology from the University of Manchester. He was elected to the first of his two terms in the assembly of Kanagawa Prefecture in 1999 and then to the House of Representatives for the first time in 2005.

== Early life ==
Born in Sagamihara, Kanagawa Prefecture to Kanagawa Prefectural Assembly Member Kazuyuki Akama, Akama grew up in the city, graduating from Samagihara Primary, Middle and Secondary school. He then go on to attend Rikkyo University for four years, during which time he served as the vice-captain of the boxing club of the Athletic Association. In 1998, he reached the 4th round of the league championship, represengting Yokota Sports Gym.

After graducating with a Bachelor of Economics degree, he travelled to England to study a masters in economic sociology from the University of Manchester Graduate School for the next four years, while also volunteering at a facility for the elderly. After graduating and returning to Japan, he helped his father in the operation of a community workshop for people who have intellectual disabilities.

== Career ==
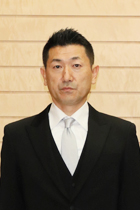
Jiro Akama in 2017

=== Assembly member ===
In 1999, Akama first ran for the Kanagawa Prefectural Assembly as an independent at the age of 31, and in winning the election he became the first independent member for the Samigahara constituency in 16 years. Shortly after his election to the assembly however he joined the Liberal Democratic Party. During Akama's first term as an assembly member, he published a bimonthly manga magazine called "Jiro Akama's Political Notebook that even a monkey can understand"

In 2003, he was re-elected as the top candidate for the Sagamihara City district for the Assembly.

During his tenure at the Assembly, Akama served as the Vice Chairman of both the Liberal Democratic Party Assembly Policy Research Committee and then of the Special Committee.

=== Representative ===
During his second term as an Assembly member, Akama decided to take part in the 2005 general election as the candidate for the Liberal Democratic Party in the 14th district of Kanagawa. He went up against the Democratic Party's acting representative Hirohisa Fujī and managed to defeat him by nearly 30,000 votes. During this first term he was a member of the House Steering Committee and the General Affairs Committee, and was devoted to developing laws that increased local autonomy in the country.

During the 2009 general election, he ran for re-election in his district, receiving endorsements from the party Komeito, but was defeated by the Democratic Party candidate Kentaro Motomura by a margin of 50,000.

Akama was re-elected to the seat in the following 2012 general election. On 4 September 2014, he was appointed to be one of the Parliamentary Vice Ministers for Internal Affairs and Communication during the Second Abe Cabinet reshuffle. Shortly after this, Akama went on to win a 3rd term in his constituency at the 2014 general election.

On 5 August 2016, Akame was appointed as a State Minister for Internal Affairs and Communications and as a State Minister of the Cabinet Office during the 2nd reshuffle of the Third Abe Cabinet. In March 2017, he visited Taiwan as the State Minister for Internal Affairs and Communications, attending the opening ceremony of a food and tourism event hosted by the Japan–Taiwan Exchange Association.

This was the first time a state minister level official had been sent to visit Taiwan on official business since the official severing of diplomatic ties between Japan and Taiwan in 1972.

In 21 October 2025, he joined the Takaichi Cabinet for the first time as Chairman of the National Public Safety Commission and Minister of State for Disaster Management.

== See also ==
- Koizumi Children
