= Minami-Hashimoto Station =

Railway station in Sagamihara, Kanagawa Prefecture, Japan

Minami-Hashimoto Station 南橋本駅
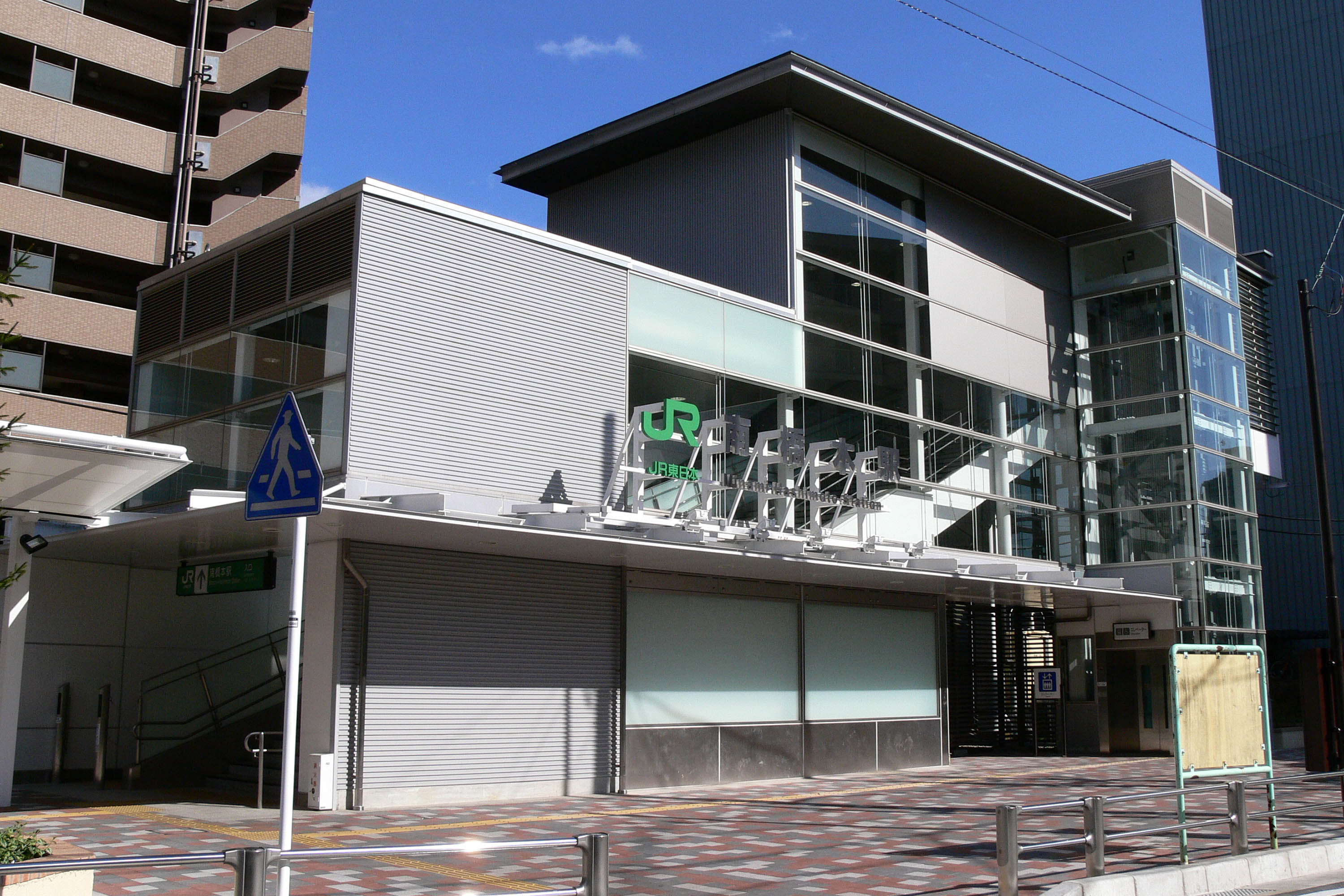
- Minami-Hashimoto Station, April 2008

General information
- Location: 2-4 Minamihashimoto, Chuo-ku, Sagamihara-shi, Kanagawa-ken 252-0253; Japan
- Coordinates: 35.580281°N 139.352442°E
- Operator: JR East
- Line: ■ Sagami Line
- Distance: 31.3 km from Chigasaki.
- Platforms: 1 island platform
- Connections: Bus stop

Other information
- Status: Staffed
- Website: Official website

History
- Opened: April 1, 1941
- Former names: Sagamimachi (until 1944)

Passengers
- FY2019: 5,595 daily (boarding passengers)

Services
Preceding station	JR East	Following station
Hashimoto towards Hachiōji	Sagami Line	Kamimizo towards Chigasaki
Location
- Location within Kanagawa Prefecture Location within Japan

Minami-Hashimoto Station (南橋本駅, Minami-Hashimoto-eki) is a passenger railway station located in the city of Sagamihara, Kanagawa Prefecture, Japan, operated by the East Japan Railway Company (JR East).

== Lines ==
Minami-Hashimoto Station is served by the Sagami Line, and is located 31.3 kilometers from the terminus of the line at Chigasaki.

== Station layout ==
The station consists of a single island platform, connected to a modern station building by a footbridge. The station is staffed.

=== Platforms ===
1	■ Sagami Line	for Hashimoto
2	■ Sagami Line	for Chigasaki

== History ==
Minami-Hashimoto Station was opened on November 1, 1932, as Okawara Siding (大河原停留場, Okawara teiryūjō), a rail siding on the Sagami Railway. It was renamed Sagamimachi Siding (相模町停留場, Sagamimachi teiryūjō) in 1940. On April 1, 1941, it was elevated in status to a Sagamimachi Station (相模町駅, Sagamimachi-eki). On June 1, 1944, the Sagami Railway was nationalized and merged with the Japanese Government Railways, at which time the station received its current name. On April 1, 1987, with the dissolution and privatization of the Japanese National Railways, the station came under the operation of JR East. Scheduled freight services were discontinued from 1996. Automated turnstiles using the Suica IC card system came into operation from November 2001. The station building was complexly rebuilt in 2006.

== Passenger statistics ==
In fiscal 2019, the station was used by an average of 5,595 passengers daily (boarding passengers only).

The passenger figures (boarding passengers only) for previous years are as shown below.

Fiscal year	daily average
2005	5,125
2010	5,311
2015	5,467

== Surrounding area ==
- Kanagawa Medical Reform School
- NEC Sagamihara Plant

== Gallery ==
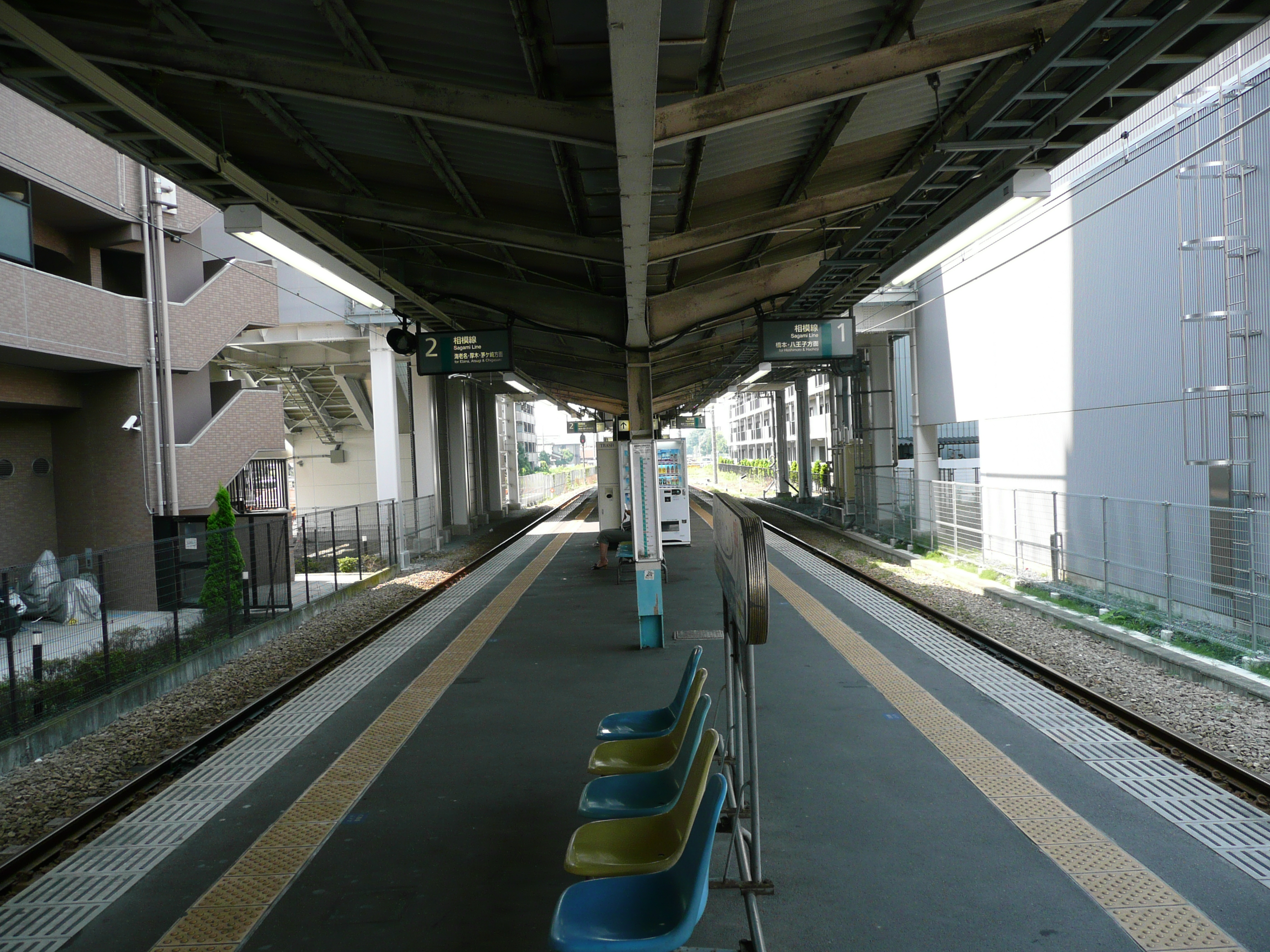
Minami-Hashimoto Station platform

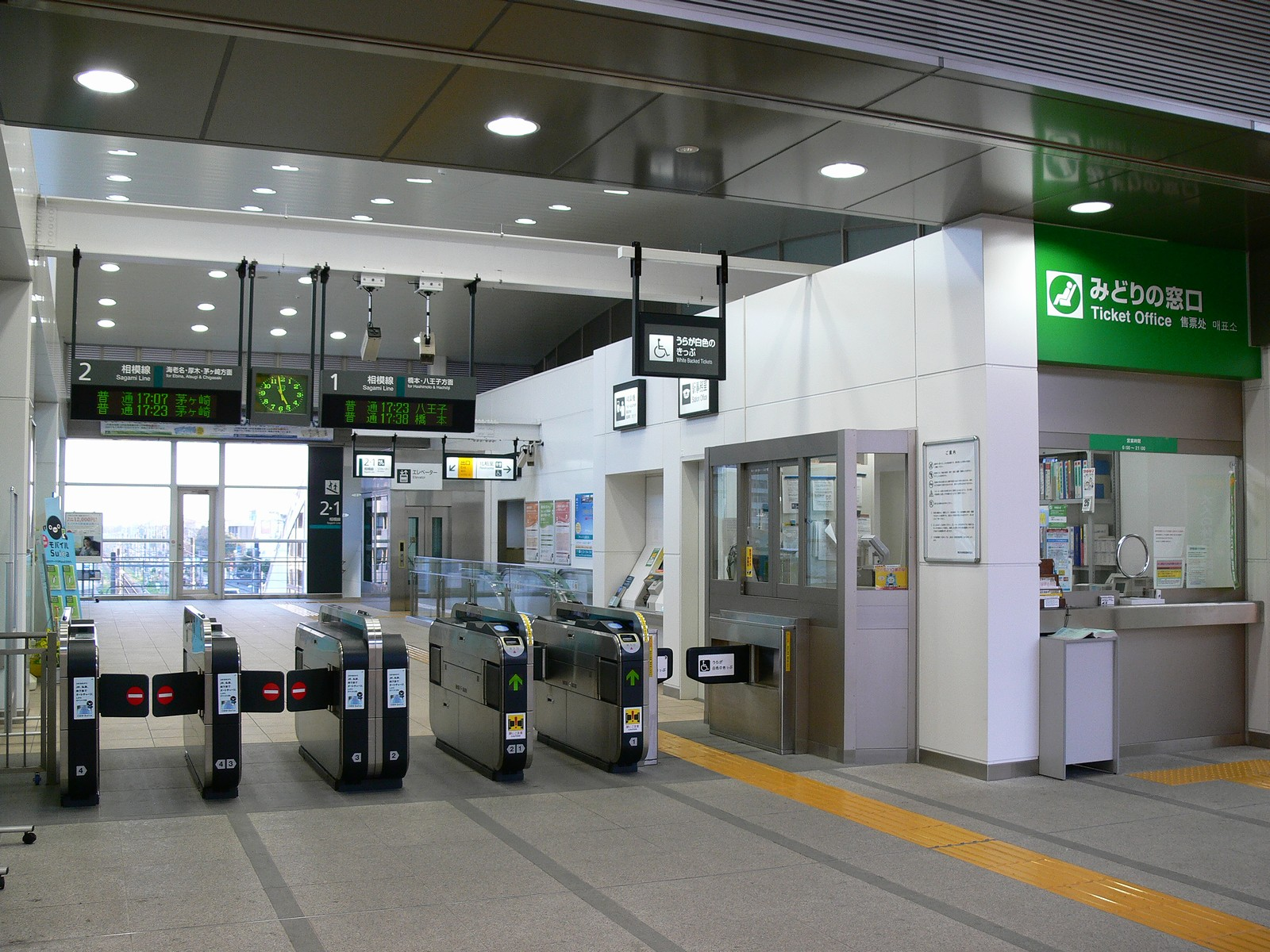
Minami-Hashimoto Station exit gate

== See also ==
- List of railway stations in Japan
