= Tsukui, Kanagawa =

Tsukui 津久井町
- Former municipality
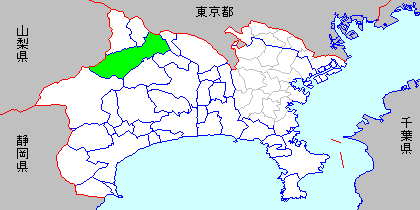
- Location of Tsukui in Kanagawa Prefecture

- Location in Japan
- Coordinates: 35.5838°N 139.2584°E
- Country: Japan
- Region: Kantō
- Prefecture: Kanagawa Prefecture
- District: Tsukui
- Merged: March 11, 2007 (now part of Sagamihara)

Area
  - Total: 122.04 km^{2} (47.12 sq mi)

Population (March 1, 2006)
  - Total: 28,551
  - Density: 233.9/km^{2} (606/sq mi)
- Time zone: UTC+09:00 (JST)
- Symbols
- Bird: Japanese bush-warbler
- Flower: Rhododendron
- Tree: Maple

Tsukui (津久井町, Tsukui-machi) was a town located in Tsukui District, Kanagawa Prefecture, Japan.

On March 20, 2006, Tsukui, along with the town of Sagamiko (also from Tsukui District), was merged into the expanded city of Sagamihara, and thus no longer exists as an independent municipality. It is now part of Midori-ku, Sagamihara.

As of March 1, 2006, final population data before the amalgamation, the town had an estimated population of 28,551 and a density of 233.9 persons per km^{2}. The total area was 122.04 km^{2}.
