= Minami-ōsawa Station =

Railway station in Hachiōji, Tokyo, Japan

Minami-ōsawa Station 南大沢駅

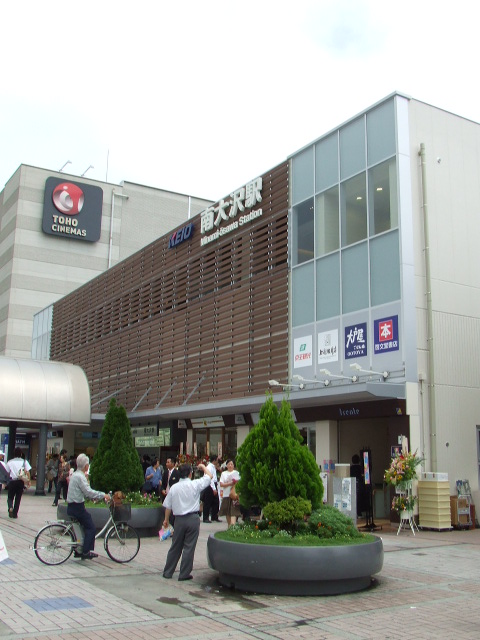
- Minami-ōsawa Station entrance, July 2007

General information
- Location: 2-1-6 Minami-ōsawa, Hachiōji-shi, Tokyo 192–0364; Japan
- Coordinates: 35.6143°N 139.3800°E
- Operator: Keio Corporation
- Line: Keio Sagamihara Line
- Distance: 33.7 km from Shinjuku
- Platforms: 2 side platforms
- Tracks: 2
- Connections: Bus terminal

Other information
- Station code: KO43
- Website: Official website

History
- Opened: 21 May 1988

Passengers
- FY2019: 63,422

Services
Preceding station	Keio Corporation	Following station
Hashimoto Terminus	Keiō Liner	Keiō-nagayama towards Shinjuku
Hashimoto Terminus	Sagamihara Line Special Express Express	Keiō-nagayama towards Chōfu
Tamasakai towards Hashimoto	Sagamihara Line Semi Express Rapid Local	Keiō-horinouchi towards Chōfu
Location
- Location within Tokyo Location within Japan

Minami-ōsawa Station (南大沢駅, Minami-ōsawa-eki) is a passenger railway station located in the city of Hachiōji, Tokyo, Japan, operated by the private railway operator Keio Corporation.

== Lines ==
Minami-ōsawa Station is served by the Keio Sagamihara Line between Chōfu and Hashimoto, with some through services from the Keio Line Tokyo terminus at Shinjuku. The station is located 18.2 km from the starting point of the Sagamihara Line at Chōfu. All services stop at this station.

== Station layout ==
The station consists of two side platforms serving two tracks. The station building and concourse is located above the tracks.

=== Platforms ===
1	■ Keio Sagamihara Line	for Hashimoto
2	■ Keio Sagamihara Line	for Chōfu and Shinjuku

== History ==
Minami-ōsawa Station opened on 21 May 1988. It initially formed the western terminus of the Sagamihara Line, until the line was extended to Hashimoto in 1990.

== Passenger statistics ==
In fiscal 2019, the station was used by an average of 63,422 passengers daily.

The passenger figures (boarding passengers only) for previous years are as shown below.

Fiscal year	daily average
2005	51,585
2010	60,396
2015	62,877

== Surrounding area ==
- Tokyo Metropolitan University Minami-ōsawa campus
- Mitsui Outlet Park Tama Ōsawa
- Minami-ōsawa Police Station
