= Tamasakai Station =

Railway station in Machida, Tokyo, Japan

Tamasakai Station 多摩境駅

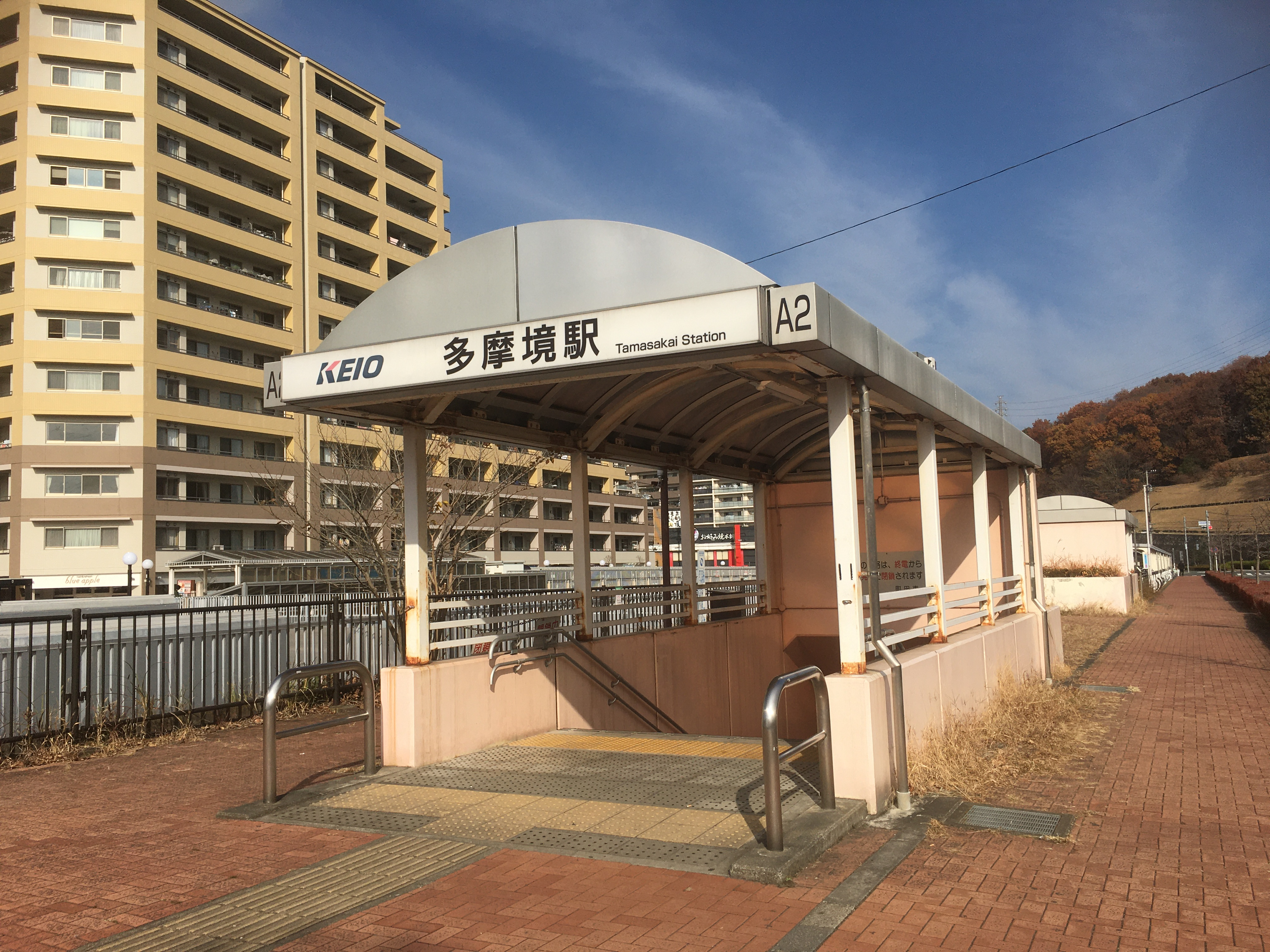
- Tamasakai Station A2 exit, 2020

General information
- Location: 3-23 Oyamagaoka, Machida-shi, Tokyo 194-0215; Japan
- Coordinates: 35.6019°N 139.367°E
- Operator: Keio Corporation
- Line: Keio Sagamihara Line
- Distance: 20.1 km from Chōfu
- Platforms: 2 side platforms
- Connections: Bus stop

Other information
- Station code: KO44
- Website: Official website

History
- Opened: April 6, 1991

Passengers
- FY 2019: 20,530

Services
Preceding station	Keio Corporation	Following station
Hashimoto Terminus	Sagamihara Line Semi Express Rapid Local	Minami-ōsawa towards Chōfu
Location
- Location within Tokyo Location within Japan

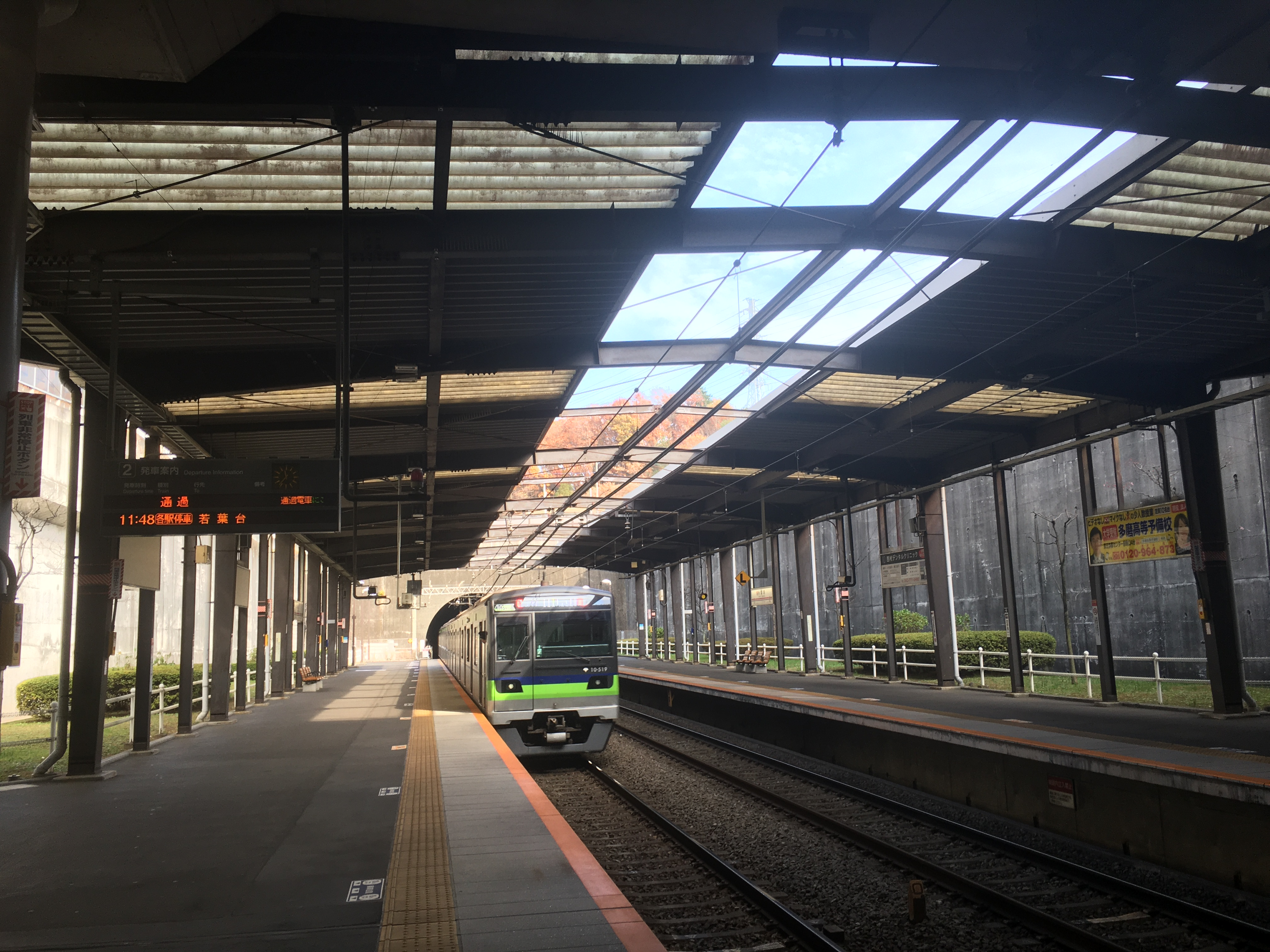
The platforms, 2020

Tamasakai Station (多摩境駅, Tamasakai-eki) is a passenger railway station located in the city of Machida, Tokyo, Japan, operated by the private railway company, Keio Corporation.

== Lines ==
Inagi Station is served by the Keiō Sagamihara Line, and is 20.1 kilometers from the terminus of the line at Chōfu and 35.6 kilometers from Shinjuku Station in downtown Tokyo.

== Layout ==
This station consists of two ground-level opposed side platforms serving two tracks.

=== Platforms ===
1	■ Keio Sagamihara Line	Hashimoto
2	■ Keiō Sagamihara Line	Chōfu

== History ==
The station opened on April 6, 1991. From 22 February 2013, station numbering was introduced on Keio lines, with Tamasakai Station becoming "KO44".

== Passenger statistics ==
In fiscal 2019, the station was used by an average of 20,530 passengers daily.

== Surrounding area ==
- Tama New Town

== See also ==
- List of railway stations in Japan
