= Shiroyama, Kanagawa =

Shiroyama 城山町
- Former municipality
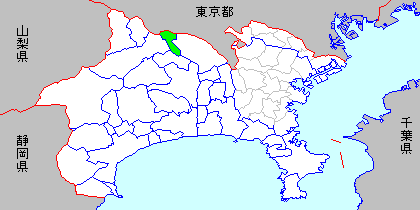
- Location of Shiroyama in Kanagawa Prefecture

- Location in Japan
- Coordinates: 35.5895°N 139.2901°E
- Country: Japan
- Region: Kantō
- Prefecture: Kanagawa Prefecture
- District: Tsukui
- Merged: March 11, 2007 (now part of Sagamihara)

Area
  - Total: 19.90 km^{2} (7.68 sq mi)

Population (March 1, 2007)
  - Total: 23,040
  - Density: 1,157.8/km^{2} (2,999/sq mi)
- Time zone: UTC+09:00 (JST)
- Symbols
- Bird: Japanese white-eye
- Flower: Azalea
- Tree: Maple

Shiroyama (城山町, Shiroyama-chō) was a town located in Tsukui District, Kanagawa Prefecture, Japan.

== Population ==
As of March 1, 2007, final population data before the amalgamation, the town had an estimated population of 23,040 and a density of 1157.8 persons per km^{2}. The total area was 19.90 km^{2}.

== History ==
On March 11, 2007, Shiroyama, along with the town of Fujino (also from Tsukui District), was merged into the expanded city of Sagamihara, and thus no longer exists as an independent municipality. It is now part of Midori-ku. The merger was controversial, and the mayor of Shiroyama was recalled for his opposition to the merger.
