= Hirohisa Fujii =

Japanese politician (1932–2022)

- 藤井 裕久
- Official portrait, 2011

Minister of Finance
- In office 16 September 2009 – 6 January 2010
- Prime Minister: Yukio Hatoyama
- Preceded by: Kaoru Yosano
- Succeeded by: Naoto Kan
- In office 9 August 1993 – 30 June 1994
- Prime Minister: Morihiro Hosokawa; Tsutomu Hata
- Preceded by: Yoshiro Hayashi
- Succeeded by: Masayoshi Takemura

Special Advisor to the Prime Minister
- In office 17 March 2011 – 5 September 2011
- Prime Minister: Naoto Kan
- Preceded by: Kiyomi Tsujimoto
- Succeeded by: Sumio Mabuchi

Deputy Chief Cabinet Secretary (Political affairs, House of Representatives)
- In office 14 January 2011 – 17 March 2011
- Prime Minister: Naoto Kan
- Preceded by: Motohisa Furukawa
- Succeeded by: Yoshito Sengoku

Member of the House of Representatives
- In office 19 July 2007 – 16 November 2012
- Preceded by: Hiroyuki Nagahama
- Succeeded by: Multi-member district
- Constituency: Southern Kanto PR
- In office 18 February 1990 – 8 August 2005
- Preceded by: Masakata Tozawa
- Succeeded by: Jiro Akama
- Constituency: Kanagawa 3rd (1990–1996); Kanagawa 14th (1996–2005)

Member of the House of Councillors
- In office 10 July 1977 – 2 June 1986
- Preceded by: Multi-member district
- Succeeded by: Hiroko Terauchi
- Constituency: National district (1977–1983); National PR (1983–1986)

Personal details
- Born: 24 June 1932 Bunkyō, Tokyo, Japan
- Died: 10 July 2022 (aged 90) Tokyo, Japan
- Party: Democratic (2003–2012)
- Other political affiliations: LDP (1977–1993); JRP (1993–1994); NFP (1994–1998); LP (1998–2003)
- Education: University of Tokyo

Hirohisa Fujii (Japanese: 藤井 裕久, Hepburn: Fujii Hirohisa; 24 June 1932 – 10 July 2022) was a Japanese politician who was a member of the House of Councillors from 1977 to 1986, and of the House of Representatives from 1990 to 2012. He served two terms as Minister of Finance, and as Secretary General of the Liberal Party and the Democratic Party of Japan.

== Early life ==
A native of Tokyo, Fujii was born on 24 June 1932. He graduated from the University of Tokyo in 1955 with a law degree. He began his career as a bureaucrat in the Ministry of Finance, which gave him authority on finance and tax system issues later in his legislative career. Toward the end of his time at the ministry, he served as an assistant to Chief Cabinet Secretaries Susumu Nikaido and Noboru Takeshita.

== Political career ==
He was elected to the House of Councillors for the first time in the 1977 election as a member of the Liberal Democratic Party. After serving two terms, he declined to run in 1986 in order to plan a run for the House of Representatives, and won a seat representing Kanagawa Prefecture in the 1990 general election.

In 1993 he left the LDP and joined the formation of the Japan Renewal Party, which later became part of the DPJ. He served as Minister of Finance in the cabinets of Morihiro Hosokawa and Tsutomu Hata, and did not substantially change the previous LDP government's financial policy objectives.

Fujii was a member of Ichiro Ozawa's Liberal Party during the late 1990s, and served as its secretary-general and headed its financial committee while it was in a coalition government with the LDP. Fujii historically supported Ozawa in opposing any increase in the consumption tax.

Fujii lost his seat in the 2005 general election and planned to retire from politics. However, he returned to the Diet in 2007 with retroactive effect after two incumbent representatives resigned. In the run-up to the 2009 general election, he led a campaign to stop Ozawa from becoming the president and prime ministerial candidate of the DPJ. He initially intended to retire from the Diet following the election, and allowed another DPJ candidate to run for his district, but withdrew his resignation at the request of Yukio Hatoyama shortly before candidate lists were finalized. The DPJ won the election in a landslide, and Fujii maintained a seat in the House despite being ranked only 35th on the party's candidate list.

=== DPJ government (2009–2012) ===
Fujii was named minister of finance after the election of Hatoyama as Prime Minister in September 2009. Shortly following his appointment, Fujii publicly opposed intervention to weaken the Japanese yen for the benefit of Japanese exporters, saying that other countries would be inclined to do the same thing. He later clarified that he did not favor a strong yen and was not pleased with its recent appreciation in value. Fujii also reversed his historical position on the consumption tax, and demanded the appointment of two vice ministers, Yoshihiko Noda and Naoki Minezaki, who were in favor of raising it. Ozawa told Fujii in December 2009 that he failed to demonstrate political leadership, and persuaded Hatoyama to change the party's campaign promise on gasoline taxes over Fujii's objections.

Fujii abruptly announced his resignation as finance minister on 5 January 2010, and it was reluctantly accepted by Prime Minister Hatoyama a day later. Fujii had been suffering from high blood pressure and exhaustion, so he claimed that his deteriorating health forced him to resign from the high-stress position of finance minister. However, some political analysts believed that Fujii resigned due to his power struggle with Ozawa.

On 7 January 2010, Naoto Kan replaced Fujii as finance minister. Fujii served in the Kan cabinet as Deputy Chief Cabinet Secretary. Noda took over the finance portfolio under the Kan government, and succeeded Kan as prime minister in 2011. Fujii remained in regular contact with Noda throughout this time, but was careful to keep a low profile in doing so. He publicly maintained his position on yen intervention, stating in 2011 that it was more important for Japan to open its markets.

He announced his retirement from politics at the age of 80, shortly prior to the 2012 general election.

== Death ==
Fujii died on 10 July 2022 at his home in Tokyo, aged 90.

Political offices
Preceded by Kaoru Yosano	Minister of Finance of Japan; 2009–2010	Succeeded by Naoto Kan
Preceded by Yoshirō Hayashi	Minister of Finance of Japan; 1993–1994	Succeeded by Masayoshi Takemura
