= Aihara Station =

Railway station in Machida, Tokyo, Japan

JH29 Aihara Station 相原駅
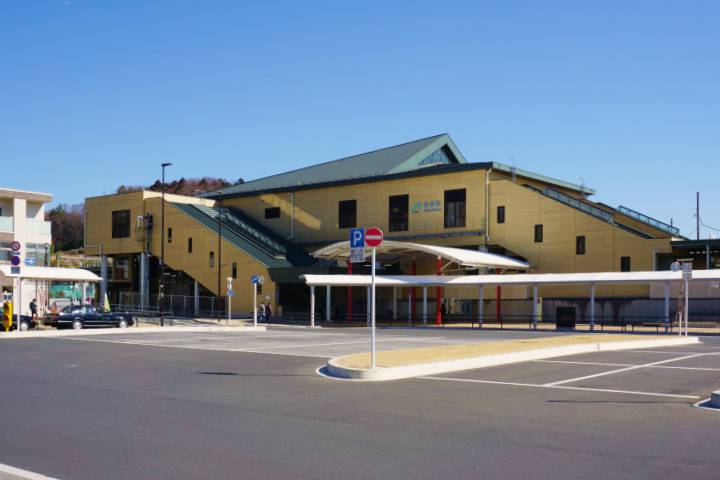
- The west forecourt in March 2017

General information
- Location: 1218-4 Aihara-machi, Machida-shi, Tokyo 194-0211; Japan
- Coordinates: 35°36′24.7″N 139°19′54″E
- Operator: JR East
- Line: Yokohama Line
- Distance: 6.9 km from Hachiōji
- Platforms: 2 side platforms
- Tracks: 2

Other information
- Station code: JH29
- Website: Official website

History
- Opened: 23 September 1908

Passengers
- FY2019: 10,407 daily

Services
| Preceding station | JR East | Following station |
|---|---|---|
| Hachiōji-Minamino JH30 towards Hachiōji | Yokohama Line Rapid Local | Hashimoto JH28 towards Higashi-Kanagawa or Ōfuna |
Location
- Location within Tokyo Location within Japan

Aihara Station (相原駅, Aihara-eki) is a passenger railway station on the Yokohama Line located in the city of Machida, Tokyo, Japan, operated by the East Japan Railway Company (JR East).

== Lines ==
Aihara Station is served by the Yokohama Line from Hachiōji to Higashi-Kanagawa, and is located 6.9 km from the northern terminus of the line at Hachiōji.

== Station layout ==
The station consists of two side platforms serving two tracks.

=== Platforms ===
| 1 | Yokohama Line | for Machida, Higashi-Kanagawa, Yokohama, Sakuragichō and Ōfuna |
| 2 | Yokohama Line | for Hachiōji |

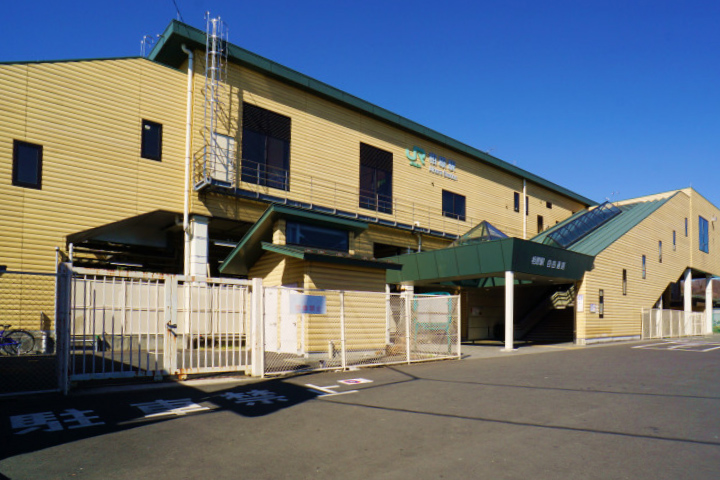
The east side of the station in March 2017

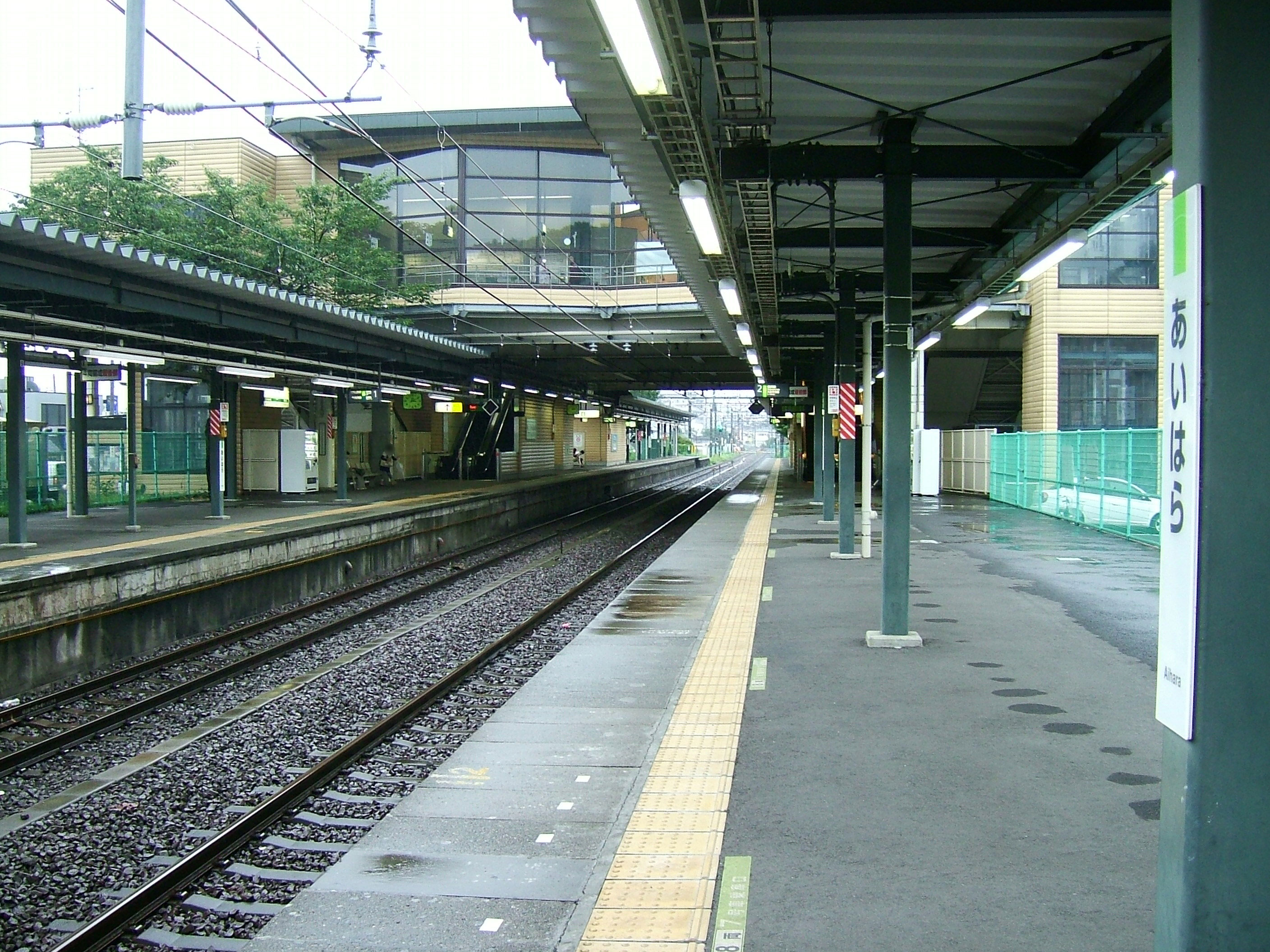
The platforms in August 2008

== History ==
The station opened on 23 September 1908. With the privatization of Japanese National Railways (JNR) on 1 April 1987, the station came under the control of JR East.

Station numbering was introduced on 20 August 2016 with Aihara being assigned station number JH29.

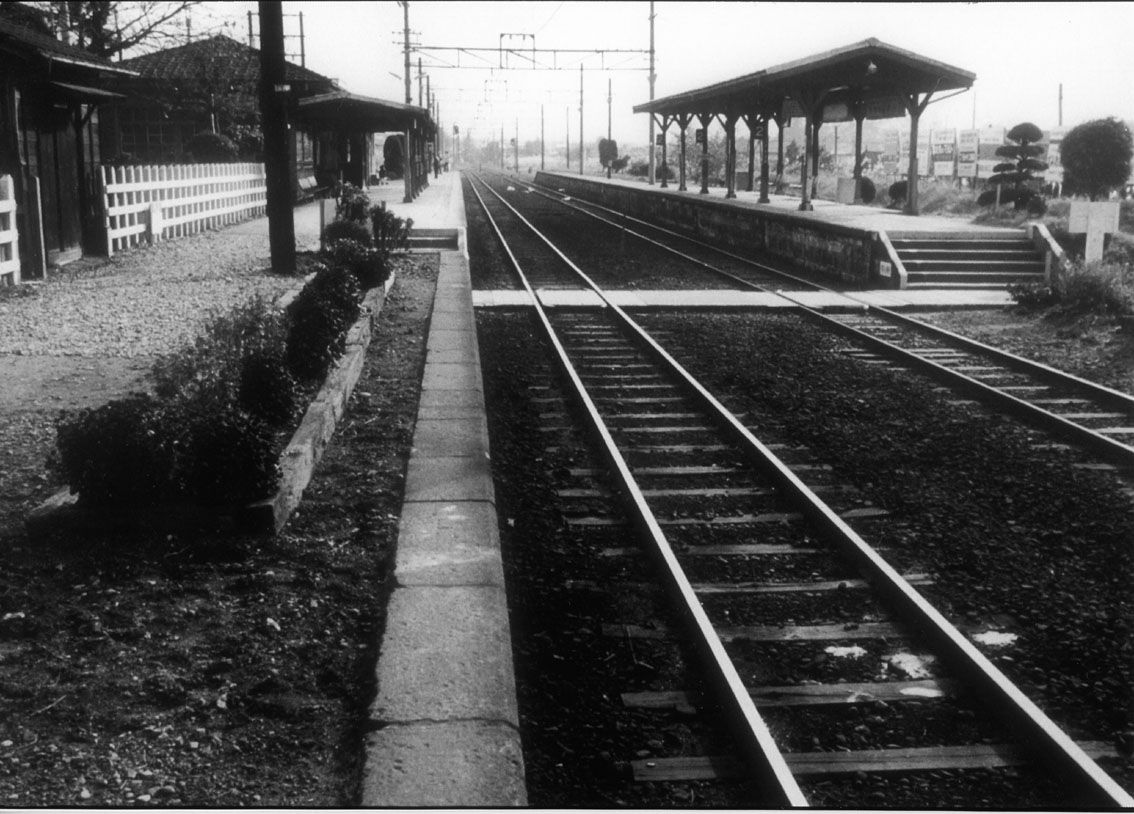
The station platforms in 1972

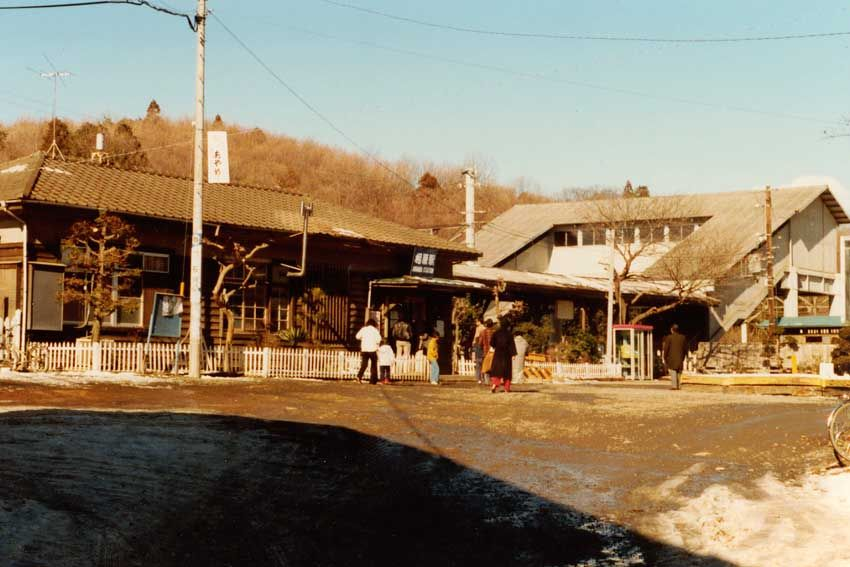
The station forecourt in 1985

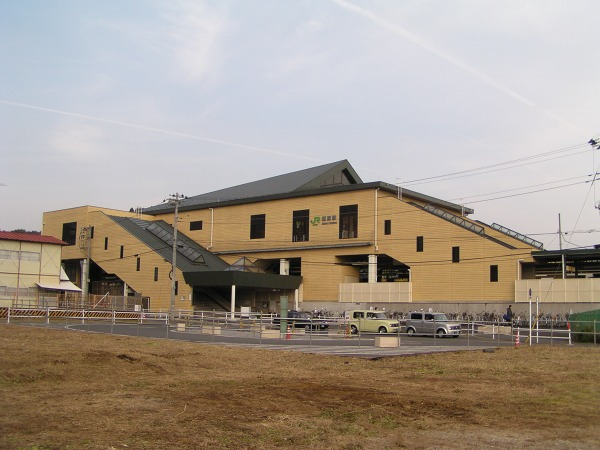
The west side in November 2005 before completion of the station forecourt

== Passenger statistics ==
In fiscal 2019, the station was used by an average of 10,407 passengers daily (boarding passengers only).

== Surrounding area ==
- Machida City Sakai City Center
- Machida City Sakai Library
- Machida City Aihara Elementary School
- Machida City Sakai Junior High School

== See also ==
- List of railway stations in Japan
