= Sagamiko, Kanagawa =

Sagamiko 相模湖町
- Former municipality
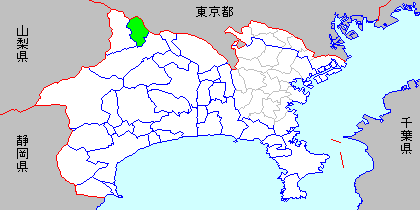
- Location of Sagamiko in Kanagawa Prefecture

- Location in Japan
- Coordinates: 35.6144°N 139.1890°E
- Country: Japan
- Region: Kantō
- Prefecture: Kanagawa Prefecture
- District: Tsukui
- Merged: March 11, 2007 (now part of Sagamihara)

Area
  - Total: 31.59 km^{2} (12.20 sq mi)

Population (March 1, 2006)
  - Total: 10,404
  - Density: 329.4/km^{2} (853/sq mi)
- Time zone: UTC+09:00 (JST)
- Symbols
- Bird: Mandarin duck
- Flower: Lilium auratum
- Tree: Katsura

Sagamiko (相模湖町, Sagamiko-machi) was a town located in Tsukui District, Kanagawa Prefecture, Japan.

== Population ==
As of March 1, 2006, the final population data before the amalgamation, showed that the town had an estimated population of 10,404 and a density of 329.4 inhabitants per square kilometre (853/sq mi). The total area was 31.59 km^{2} (12.20 sq mi).

== History ==
On March 20, 2006, Sagamiko, along with the town of Tsukui (also from Tsukui District), was merged into the expanded city of Sagamihara, and thus no longer exists as an independent municipality. It is now part of Midori-ku, Sagamihara.
