= Tsukui District, Kanagawa =

Former district in Kanagawa prefecture, Japan

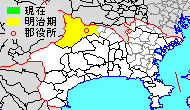
Map of former Tsukui District with Meiji period area in yellow, modern area in green: 1. - Shiroyama, 2. - Tsukui, 3. - Sagamiko, 4. - Fujino

Tsukui District (津久井郡, Tsukui-gun) was a district located in the far northwestern corner of Kanagawa Prefecture, Japan.

From 2007 it merged into the city of Sagamihara. Prior to its merger it consisted of four towns (Shiroyama, Tsukui, Sagamiko, Fujino), with a total area of 238.44 square kilometers and a population of 72,871. The district was located in the Tanzawa Mountains.

== History ==
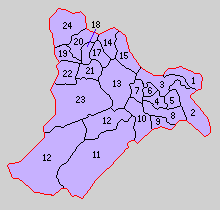
Historic Map of Tsukui District

Tsukui District was regarded as a portion of Aikō District until the Meiji period, although as a regional name, “Tsukui” appears in Kamakura period and Sengoku period documents. During the Edo period, the area was largely tenryō territory controlled directly by the Tokugawa shogunate in Edo, although ruled as a patchwork of small fiefs held by various hatamoto, except for the brief period from 1663 to 1684, when the entire district was ruled by Sekiyado Domain. A portion of the district was also controlled by Odawara Domain.

After the Meiji restoration, the Shogunal and hatamoto holdings became part of the short-lived Nirayama Prefecture, which merged with Kanagawa Prefecture in 1869. The Odawara-ruled portion became part of the equally short-lived Odawara Prefecture, which merged into Ashigaru Prefecture in 1871, and then into Kanagawa Prefecture in 1876.

In 1889, Tsukui District was organized into one town, 21 villages and 2 post stations.

== Towns and villages ==
Prior to its abolition, Tsukui District consisted of two towns:

- Fujino
- Shiroyama

== Mergers ==
- On March 20, 2006 the towns of Sagamiko and Tsukui were merged into Sagamihara.
- On March 11, 2007 the towns of Fujino and Shiroyama were merged into Sagamihara.

=== Merger problems ===
- On February 19, 2006, the current mayor of Shiroyama was recalled for denying to join Sagamiko, Tsukui, and Fujino (scheduled to be merged with Sagamihara in the future) to merged into Sagamihara. Tsukui District failed to dissolve as a result of this recall election.
- The official dissolved date of this district was March 11, 2007, when Shiroyama and Fujino were merged into Sagamihara.
