= Sagamihara =

Sagamihara 相模原市
- Designated city
- Sagamihara City
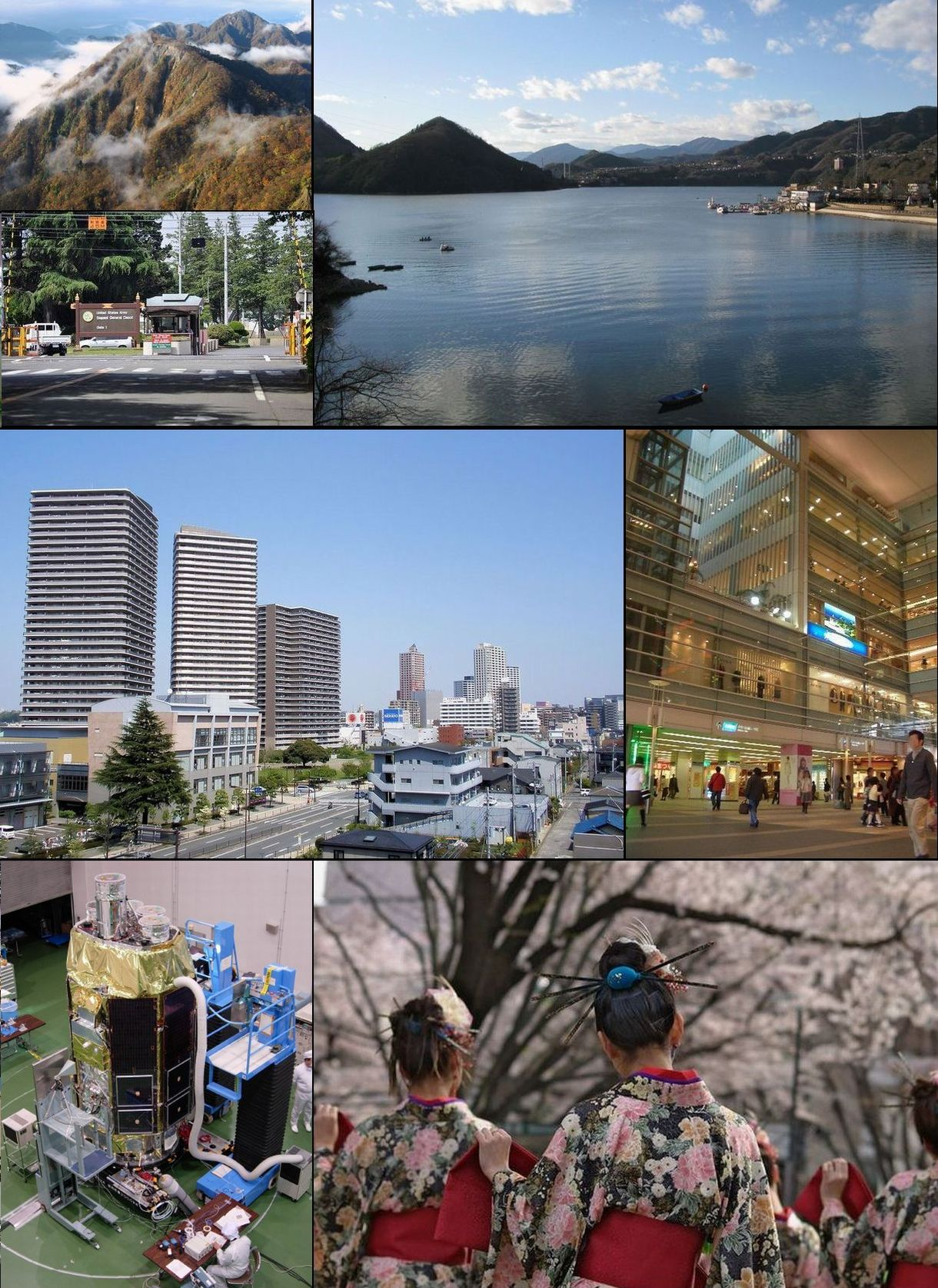
- From top left: Tanzawa mountains, USARJ Sagami General Depot, Lake Sagami, Hashimoto District, Odakyu Sagami-Ōno Station, JAXA Sagamihara Campus, Sakura Festival

- Flag Seal

- Location of Sagamihara (purple) in Kanagawa Prefecture

- Sagamihara (Kanto Area) Sagamihara (Kanagawa Prefecture)
- Coordinates: 35°34′N 139°22′E
- Country: Japan
- Region: Kantō
- Prefecture: Kanagawa
- First official recorded: 110 AD
- City settled: November 20, 1954

Government
  - Mayor: Kentarō Motomura (since April 2019)

Area
  - Total: 328.91 km^{2} (126.99 sq mi)

Population (May 1, 2021)
  - Total: 723,470
  - Density: 2,199.6/km^{2} (5,696.9/sq mi)
- Time zone: UTC+9 (Japan Standard Time)
  - Tree: Zelkova serrata
  - Flower: Hydrangea
  - Bird: Skylark
- Phone number: 042-754-1111
- Address: 2-11-15 Chūō, Chūō-ku, Sagamihara-shi, Kanagawa-ken 252-5277
- Website: Official website

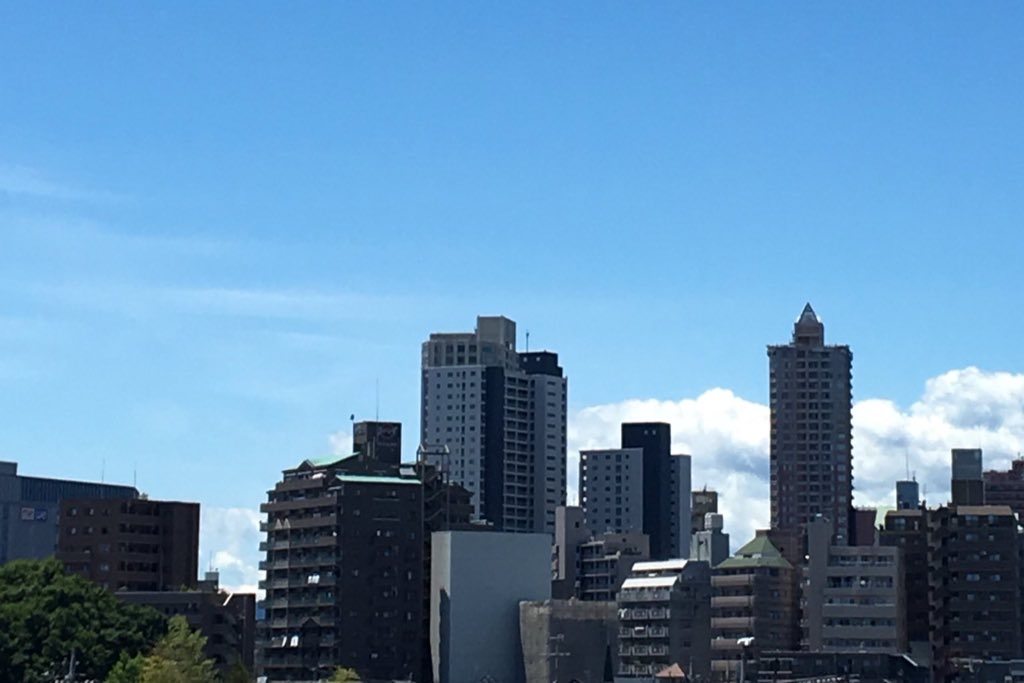
Downtown of Sagamihara（Hashimoto）

A street view in Sagamihara

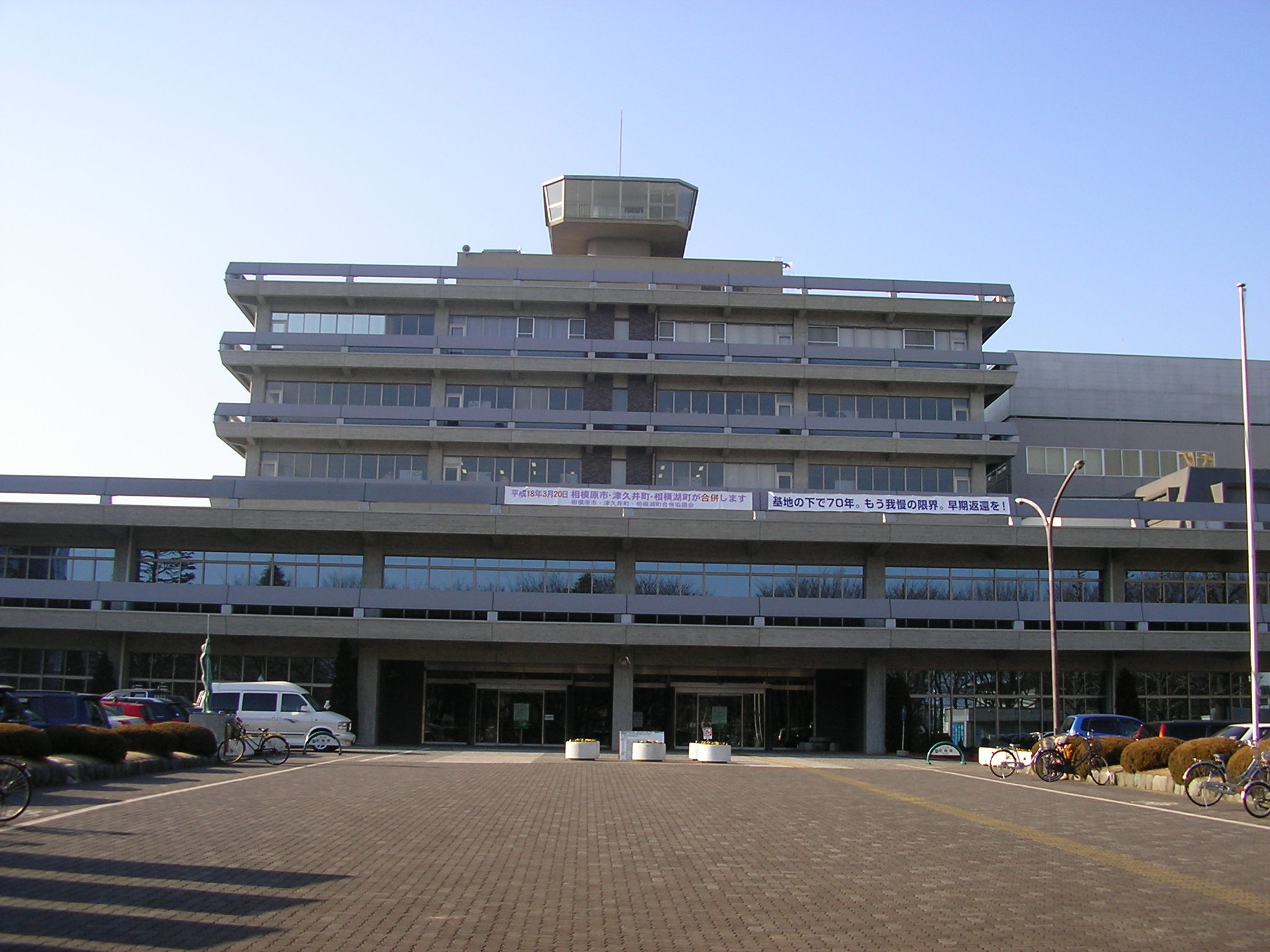
Sagamihara city hall

Sagamihara (相模原市, Sagamihara-shi) is a city in Kanagawa Prefecture, Japan. As of May 1, 2021, the city has an estimated population of 723,470, with 334,812 households, and a population density of 1,220 persons per km^{2}. The total area of the city is 328.91 square kilometres (126.99 sq mi). Sagamihara is the third-most-populous city in the prefecture, after Yokohama and Kawasaki, and the fifth most populous suburb of the Greater Tokyo Area. Its northern neighbor is Machida, with which a cross-prefectural merger has been proposed.

On April 1, 2010, the city became the 19th city designated by government ordinance. As a result of this, three wards were established: Midori-ku, Chūō-ku and Minami-ku.

== Geography ==
Sagamihara covers a large area of northwestern Kanagawa Prefecture. The main areas of commercial activity in Sagamihara are located near Hashimoto Station on the JR East Yokohama Line and Keio Sagamihara Line; Sagamihara Station on the Yokohama Line; and Sagami-Ōno Station on the Odakyu Odawara Line. Western Sagamihara is within the Tanzawa Mountains.

=== Wards ===
- Chūō-ku – administrative center
- Midori-ku
- Minami-ku

=== Surrounding municipalities ===
Kanagawa Prefecture

- Aikawa
- Atsugi
- Kiyokawa
- Yamakita
- Yamato
- Zama

Tokyo

- Hachioji
- Hinohara
- Machida

Yamanashi Prefecture

- Dōshi
- Uenohara

=== Climate ===
Sagamihara has a humid subtropical climate (Köppen Cfa) characterized by warm summers and cool winters with light to no snowfall. The average annual temperature in Sagamihara is 12.6 °C. The average annual rainfall is 1906 mm with September as the wettest month. The temperatures are highest on average in August, at around 23.9 °C, and lowest in January, at around 1.2 °C.

== Demographics ==
Per Japanese census data, the population of Sagamihara has grown steadily over the past 70 years.

Historical population
Year	Pop.	±%
1950	106,827	—
1960	137,114	+28.4%
1970	317,296	+131.4%
1980	494,255	+55.8%
1990	602,426	+21.9%
2000	681,150	+13.1%
2010	717,515	+5.3%
2020	725,493	+1.1%

== History ==
The area of modern Sagamihara has been settled since ancient times, and has a number of remains from the Japanese Paleolithic period and Kofun period have been found. It was home to the Yokoyama clan, one of the seven warrior clans of the Musashi region during the early Kamakura period. During the Edo period, the lands around Sagamihara were tenryō territory theoretically administered directly by the Tokugawa Shogunate in Edo; however, in reality, the area was a patchwork of small fiefs held by various hatamoto, as well as exclaves under the control of the Ogino-Yamanaka Domain and Karasuyama Domain.

After the Meiji Restoration, the eastern portion was part of Kōza District, and the western portion was part of Tsukui District. The Kōza District portion was administratively divided into six villages on April 1, 1889 with the creation of the modern municipalities system. The area was the location of extensive training facilities and arsenals of the Imperial Japanese Army during the 1930s. These villages were merged on April 29, 1941, together with neighboring Zama Town to create Sagamihara Town. At the time of its formation, it was the largest town in Japan in terms of area.

On September 1, 1948, Zama was administratively separated into Zama Town. The remaining portion became Sagamihara City on November 20, 1954. The city population had grown steadily, partly due to local industrial development, and partly due to the city's excellent transportation infrastructure connecting it to Yokohama, Tokyo and Hachiōji. It was designated a core city with increased autonomy in 2003.

On March 20, 2006, Sagamihara absorbed the towns of Tsukui and Sagamiko (both from Tsukui District). The merged city consisted of two geographically separate areas, as two other towns of Tsukui District (Fujino and Shiroyama) elected to remain separate. A further merger on March 11, 2007, joined Fujino and Shiroyama with Sagamihara, thus geographically unifying the city, and dissolving former Tsukui District. In 2007, the population of Sagamihara exceeded 700,000. In 2010, Sagamihara was redesignated as a government ordinance city and split into three wards Midori-ku, Chūō-ku, and Minami-ku.

On July 25, 2016, 19 people were killed and 26 injured in a mass stabbing incident at a disabled care home in the city by Satoshi Uematsu, the perpetrator.

== Government ==
Sagamihara has a mayor-council form of government with a directly elected mayor and a unicameral city council of 49 members. Sagamihara contributes eight members to the Kanagawa Prefectural Assembly. In terms of national politics, the city was divided between the Kanagawa 14th district and Kanagawa 16th district of the lower house of the Diet of Japan until the 2024 Japanese general election when it became represented by the Kanagawa 14th district and the newly formed Kanagawa 20th district.

== Economy ==
In terms of economy and geography such as railroads and roads, Sagamihara has stronger ties with Tokyo than other cities in the prefecture, especially with the Tama area such as Machida and Hachioji. In addition, it is positioned by the national government as the core of the southwestern part of the Tokyo metropolitan area. However, due to the successive withdrawal of large factories in the city, the aspect of Sagimahara as a commuter town has become stronger, and the percentage of commuters to work and school in Tokyo in 2015 was 24.6%.

== Education ==
- Azabu University
- Izumi Junior College
- Sagami Women's University
- Sagamihara has 13 public high schools and one combined middle/high school operated by the Kanagawa Prefectural Board of Education, and the prefecture also operates two special education schools for the handicapped. There are also two private high schools.

== Transportation ==
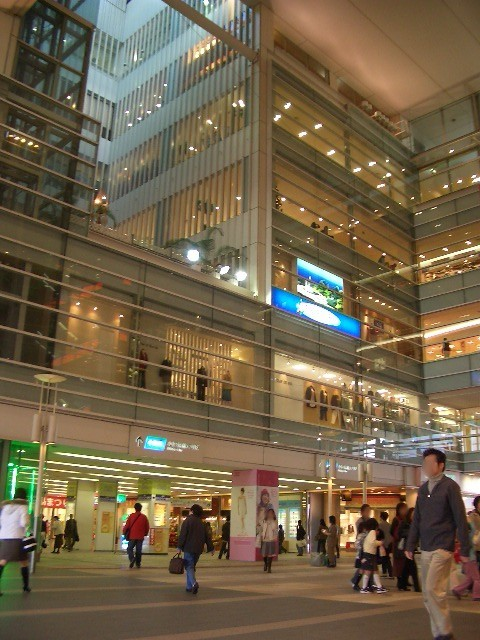
Sagami-Ono Station Square

=== Railway ===
JR East – Yokohama Line

- Kobuchi – Fuchinobe – Yabe – Sagamihara – Hashimoto

JR East – Sagami Line

- Sōbudai-shita – Shimomizo – Harataima – Banda – Kamimizo – Minami-Hashimoto – Hashimoto

JR East – Chūō Main Line

- Sagamiko – Fujino

Odakyu Electric Railway – Odakyu Odawara Line

- Sagami-Ono – Odakyū-Sagamihara – Higashi-Rinkan

Keio Corporation – Sagamihara Line

- Hashimoto

=== Highways ===
- Chūō Expressway
- Ken-Ō Expressway
- National Route 16
- National Route 20
- National Route 129
- National Route 412
- National Route 413

== Local attractions ==
- Lake Sagami
- Sagamihara Prefectural Park
- Sagamihara Vending Machine Park
- Yōgen Temple (妙現寺), built in 1598

== Sports ==
- Mitsubishi Sagamihara DynaBoars
- SC Sagamihara
- Nojima Stella Kanagawa Sagamihara
- Nojima Sagamihara Rise

== Sister cities ==
- Toronto, Ontario, Canada since January 1, 1998
- Trail, British Columbia, Canada, since April 15, 1991
- Wuxi, Jiangsu, China, since October 6, 1985

== Notable people from Sagamihara ==
- Ryo Aitaka, heavyweight kickboxer
- Jin Akimoto, retired mixed martial artist
- Jiro Akama, politician
- Hiroko Anzai, actress, model and gravure idol
- Hayato Arakaki, professional baseball pitcher and player (Hokkaido Nippon-Ham Fighters, Nippon Professional Baseball – Pacific League)
- Akira Asahara, professional Magic: The Gathering player
- Nana Eikura, model, actress, and radio show host
- Tsuneo Enari, photographer
- Masato Fukae, professional baseball outfielder
- Tatsunori Hara, baseball manager (Yomiuri Giants, Nippon Professional Baseball)
- Tasuku Hatanaka, actor, voice actor and singer
- Tomoki Hayakawa, professional football player
- Yūki Himura, comedian, actor and voice actor
- Akiko Ichikawa, Japanese American interdisciplinary artist, editor, writer and activist
- Taiyo Igarashi, professional football player
- Akira Iida, Super GT racing driver
- Yu Inaba, actor (Kamen Rider Drive)
- Megumi Inoue, sport shooter
- Yōzaburō Kanari, manga story writer (Kindaichi Case Files)
- Tsutomu Kashiwakura, voice actor and sound director
- Ukyo Katayama, former Formula One driver and team manager
- Tsuyoshi Kawagishi, former Nippon Professional Baseball pitcher (Tohoku Rakuten Golden Eagles, Pacific League)
- Hidetaka Kawagoe, former Nippon Professional Baseball pitcher
- Tsuyoshi Kikuchihara, former baseball player
- Yuna Kotani, female curler
- Keiichiro Koyama, musician, leader of NEWS
- Tomoyoshi Koyama, professional motorcycle road racer
- Togi Makabe, professional wrestler (New Japan Pro-Wrestling)
- Mai Murakami, Olympic gymnast
- Ayako Nishikawa, female TV star, tarento, comedian, and cosmetic surgeon
- Hiroyuki Nishimura, internet entrepreneur, self-help author and TV personality
- Yukio Ozaki, politician
- Kenji Ozawa, world-famous conductor
- Plaek Phibunsongkhram, former Thai Prime Minister died here in exile.
- Reita, bassist for the Gazette (band)
- Makoto Sasamoto, Greco-Roman wrestler
- Shin'ya Satō, professional shogi player ranked 7-dan
- Ryōichi Sekiya, ultramarathon and marathon runner
- Masaki Shirai, guitarist for Alexandros
- Shinya Tasaki, sommelier
- Ai Tominaga, fashion model and actress
- Yuki Tsunoda, Formula One racing driver
- Momo Watanabe, professional wrestler (World Wonder Ring Stardom)
- Yuuya Watanabe, professional Magic: The Gathering player
- Mika Yoshikawa, middle- and long-distance runner
