= Hashimoto Station (Kanagawa) =

Railway station in Sagamihara, Kanagawa Prefecture, Japan

JH28 Hashimoto Station 橋本駅

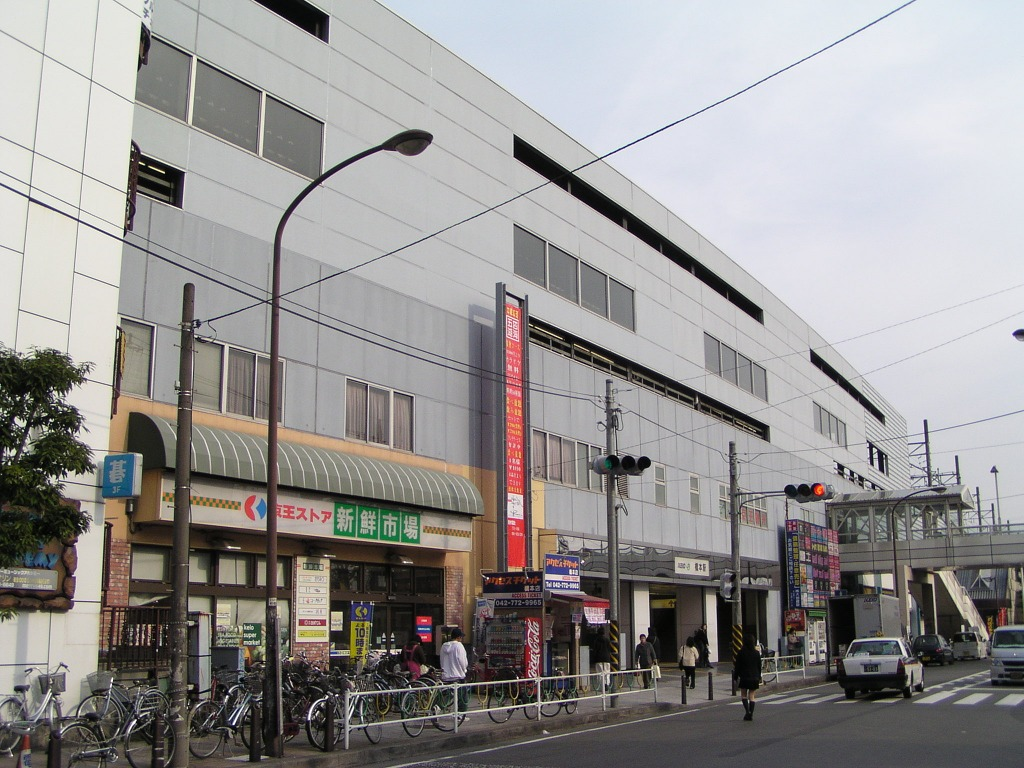
- The south side of Hashimoto Station

General information
- Location: 6 Hashimoto, Midori-ku, Sagamihara-shi, Kanagawa-ken 252–0143; Japan
- Coordinates: 35°35′41″N 139°20′40″E
- System: Hashimoto Station
- Operator: JR East; Keio Corporation
- Lines: Yokohama Line; ■ Sagami Line; Keio Sagamihara Line
- Platforms: 1 side platform + 3 island platforms
- Connections: Bus stop

Other information
- Status: Staffed (Midori no Madoguchi)
- Station code: KO45 (Keio); JH28(Yokohama line)

History
- Opened: 23 September 1908

Passengers
- FY2019: 65,328 (JR, boarding); 98,086 (Keio, total)

Services
Preceding station	JR East	Following station
Aihara JH29 towards Hachiōji	Yokohama Line Rapid Local	Sagamihara JH27 towards Higashi-Kanagawa or Ōfuna
Terminus	Sagami Line	Minami-Hashimoto towards Chigasaki
Preceding station	Keio Corporation	Following station
Terminus	Keiō Liner	Minami-ōsawa towards Shinjuku
Terminus	Sagamihara Line Special Express Express	Minami-ōsawa towards Chōfu
Terminus	Sagamihara Line Semi Express Rapid Local	Tamasakai towards Chōfu
Location
- Location within Kanagawa Prefecture Location within Japan

Hashimoto Station (橋本駅, Hashimoto-eki) is a major interchange railway station located in the city of Sagamihara, Kanagawa, Japan and operated by the East Japan Railway Company (JR East) and the private railway operator Keio Corporation.

== Lines ==
Hashimoto Station is served by the Yokohama Line and Sagami Line operated by JR East, as well as the Keio Sagamihara Line. It is 33.8 km (21.0 mi) from Higashi-Kanagawa, 33.3 km (20.7 mi) from Chigasaki, and 38.1 km (23.7 mi) from Shinjuku, the termini of these three lines respectively.

== Station layout ==
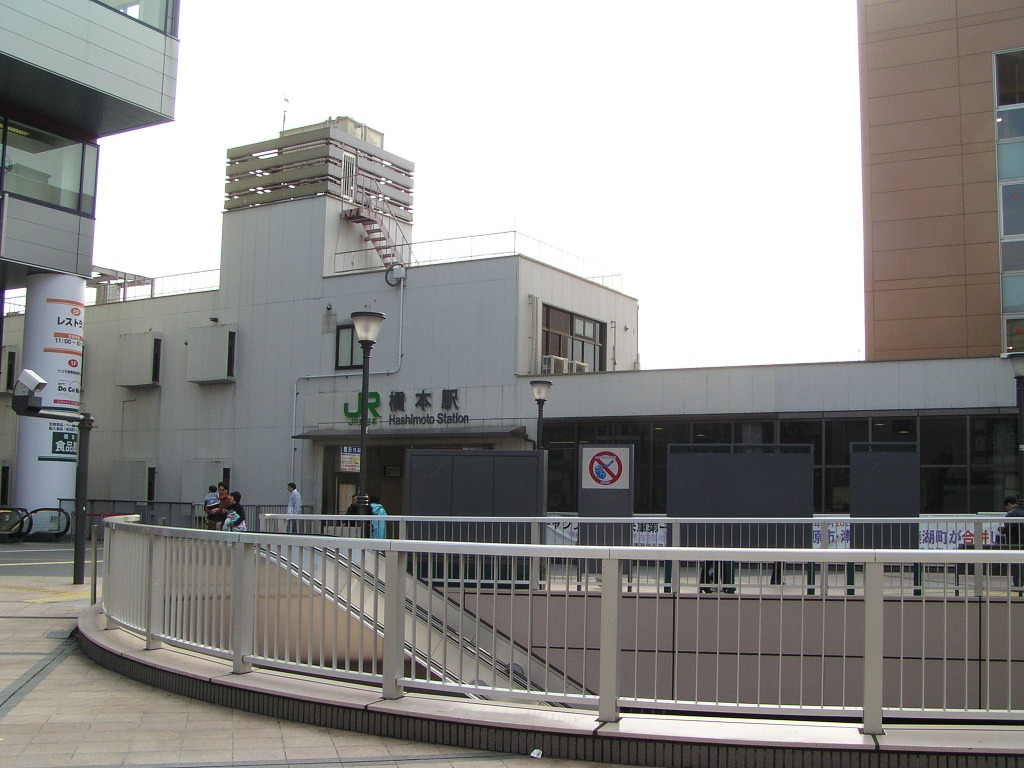
North side

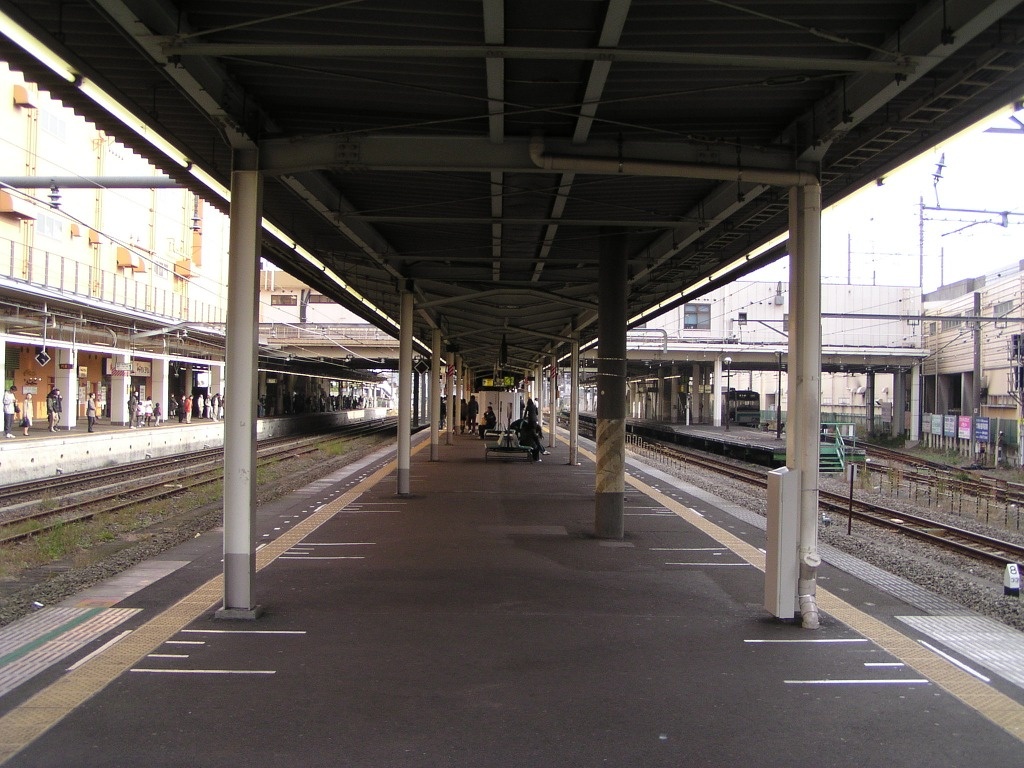
JR East platform

The JR East station has two island platforms and one side platform. The station building is built above the platforms and tracks, and the station has a "Midori no Madoguchi" staffed ticket office. The Keio station has one elevated island platform, with the station building underneath. Interconnecting from platform 5 is impossible (as of 2022). There are platform screen doors on platforms 1, 2, and 3 for the Yokohama Line. Beyond platform 4, the tracks of the Sagami Line connect with the Yokohama Line (towards Hachiōji Station). Until March 2022, the Sagami Line provided through service onto the Yokohama Line.

=== JR East platforms ===
1-2	Yokohama Line	for Machida, Higashi-Kanagawa, Yokohama, Sakuragichō and Ofuna
3	Yokohama Line	for Hachiōji
4-5	■ Sagami Line	for Ebina and Chigasaki

=== Keio platforms ===
1	Keiō Sagamihara Line	for Keiō-Tama-Center, Chōfu, Meidaimae, and Shinjuku; Toei Shinjuku Line
2	Keiō Sagamihara Line	for Keiō-Tama-center, Chōfu, Meidaimae, and Shinjuku; Toei Shinjuku Line

== History ==
The JR East station opened on 23 September 1908. The Keio station opened on 31 March 1990.

Station numbering was introduced to the Yokohama Line on 20 August 2016 with Hashimoto being assigned station number JH28.

=== Future plans ===
The Kanagawa Prefectural Government has expressed its wishes to build an interchange station here on the Chuo Shinkansen high-speed maglev line, which is scheduled to open in 2027.

== Passenger statistics ==
In fiscal 2019, the JR station was used by an average of 65,328 passengers daily (boarding passengers only). During the same period, the Keio portion of the station was used by 98,086 passengers daily (total).

The passenger figures for previous years are as shown below.

Fiscal year	daily average (JR)	daily average (Keio)
2005	54,854	54,854
2010	60,122	43,621
2015	64,473	46,530

== Surrounding area ==
- Midori Ward Office

== See also ==
- List of railway stations in Japan
