= Chūō-ku, Sagamihara =

Chūō 中央区
- Ward
- Chūō Ward
- Seal

- Location of Chūō-ku (purple) in Sagamihara and the surrounding Kanagawa Prefecture

- Coordinates: 35°34′17″N 139°22′24″E
- Country: Japan
- Region: Kantō
- Prefecture: Kanagawa
- City: Sagamihara

Area
  - Total: 36.8 km^{2} (14.2 sq mi)

Population (March 1, 2010)
  - Total: 265,057
  - Density: 7,202/km^{2} (18,650/sq mi)
- Time zone: UTC+9 (Japan Standard Time)
- Phone number: 042-769-9802
- Address: 11-15, Chūō 2-chōme Chūō-ku, Sagamihara-shi Kanagawa-ken 252-5277
- Website: Chūō-ku home page

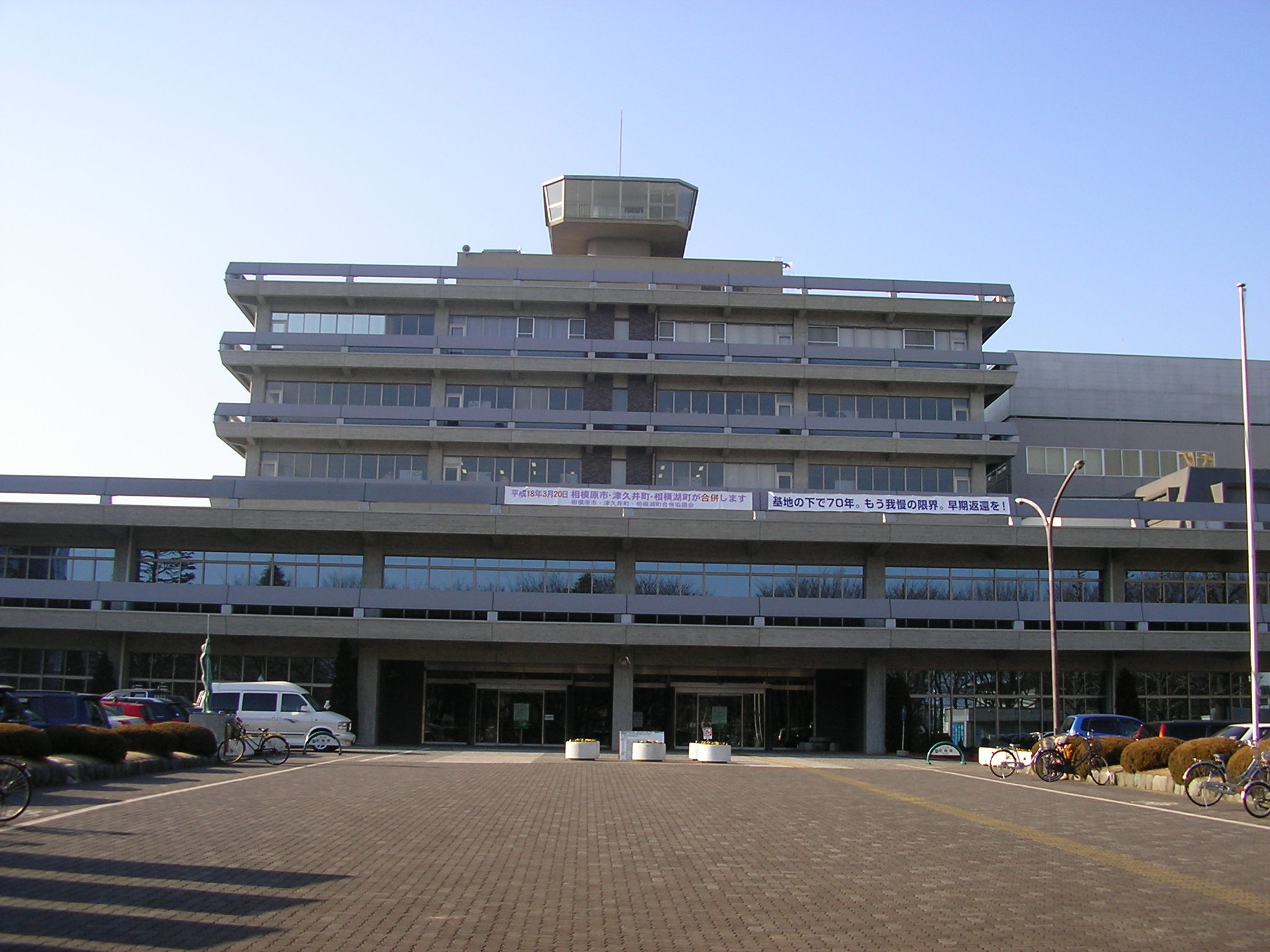
Sagamihara City Hall, also housing Chūō-ku Ward Office

Chūō-ku (中央区, Chūō-ku) is one of three wards of Sagamihara, Kanagawa, Japan, located in the central part of the city. The north west of Chūō-ku faces Midori-ku; the south east faces Minami-ku; the north faces Machida.

Chūō-ku was created on April 1, 2010 when Sagamihara became a city designated by government ordinance (a "designated city").

As of March 2010, Chūō-ku had a population of 265,057, with a land area of 36.8 square kilometers.

== Education ==
Municipal junior high schools:

- Chuo (中央中学校)
- Kamimizo (上溝中学校)
- Kamimizo Minami (上溝南中学校)
- Kyowa (共和中学校)
- Midorigaoka (緑が丘中学校)
- Ono Kita (大野北中学校)
- Oyama (小山中学校)
- Seishin (清新中学校)
- Tana (田名中学校)
- Yaei (弥栄中学校)
- Yoshinodai (由野台中学校)

Municipal elementary schools:

- Aoba (青葉小学校)
- Chuo (中央小学校)
- Fuchinobe (淵野辺小学校)
- Fuchinobe Higashi (淵野辺東小学校)
- Fujimi (富士見小学校)
- Hikarigaoka (光が丘小学校)
- Hoshigaoka (星が丘小学校)
- Kamimizo (上溝小学校)
- Kamimizo Minami (上溝南小学校)
- Koyo (向陽小学校)
- Kyowa (共和小学校)
- Namiki (並木小学校)
- Ono Kita (大野北小学校)
- Oyama (小山小学校)
- Seishin (清新小学校)
- Shinjuku (新宿小学校)
- Tana (田名小学校)
- Tana Kita (田名北小学校)
- Yaei (弥栄小学校)
- Yokodai (陽光台小学校)
- Yokoyama (横山小学校)
