= Minami-ku, Sagamihara =

Minami 南区
- Ward
- Minami Ward
- Seal

- Location of Minami-ku (purple) in Sagamihara and the surrounding Kanagawa Prefecture

- Coordinates: 35°31′50″N 139°25′45″E
- Country: Japan
- Region: Kantō
- Prefecture: Kanagawa
- City: Sagamihara

Area
  - Total: 38.2 km^{2} (14.7 sq mi)

Population (February 1, 2010)
  - Total: 272,794
  - Density: 7,141/km^{2} (18,500/sq mi)
- Time zone: UTC+9 (Japan Standard Time)
- Phone number: 042-749-2134
- Address: 31-1, Sagamiōno 5-chōme, Minami-Ku, Sagamihara-shi Kanagawa-ken 252-0377
- Website: Minami-ku home page

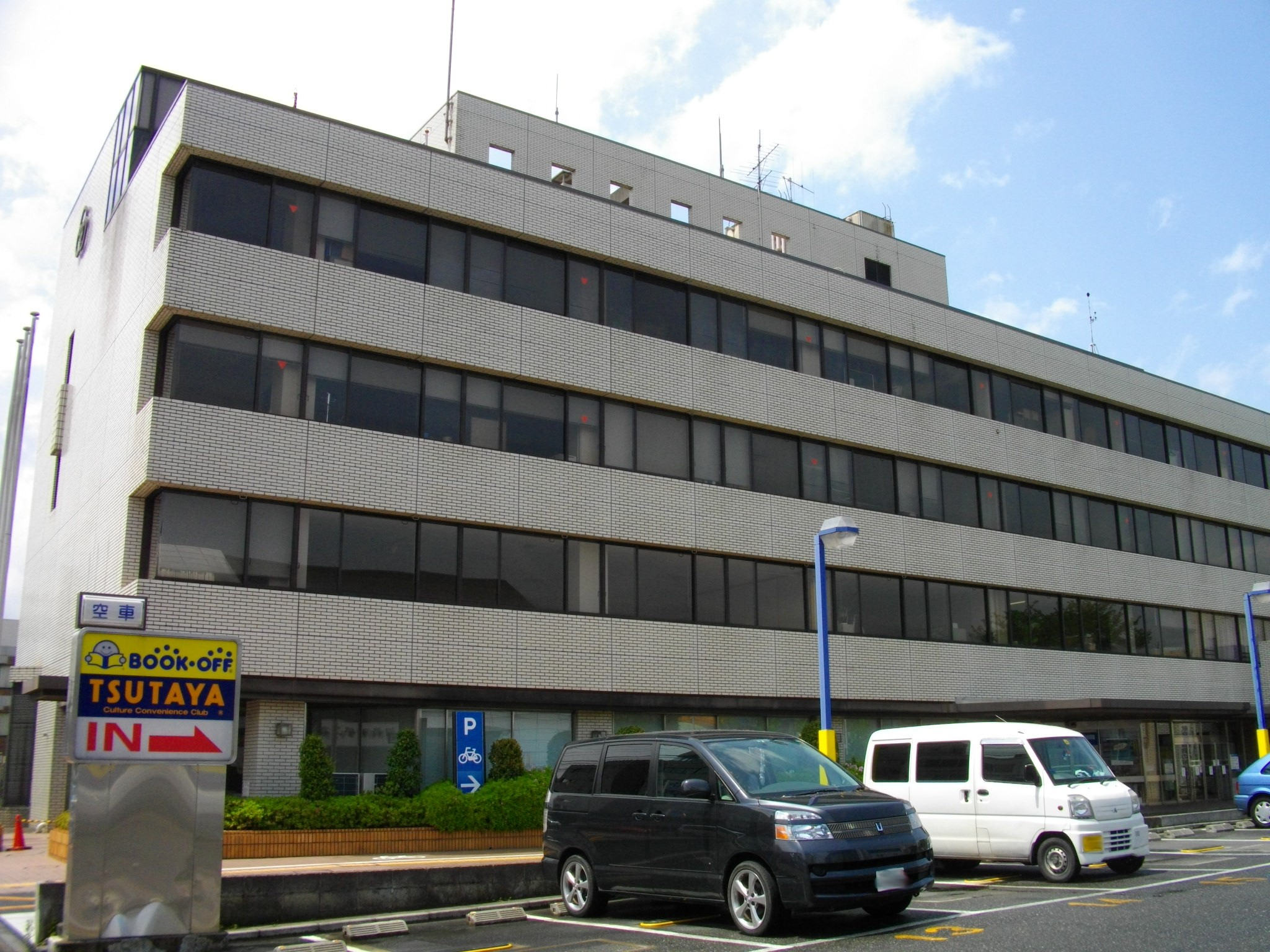
Sagamihara Minami-ku Ward Office

Minami-ku (南区, Minami-ku) is one of three wards of Sagamihara, Kanagawa, Japan, located in the east part of the city. The west of Minami-ku faces Chūō-ku.

Minami-ku was created on April 1, 2010, when Sagamihara became a city designated by government ordinance (a "designated city").

As of March 2010, Minami-ku had a population of 272,794, with a land area of 38.2 square kilometers.

== Education ==
Municipal junior high schools:

- Asamizodai (麻溝台中学校)
- Kami Tsuruma (上鶴間中学校)
- Onodai (大野台中学校)
- Ono Minami (大野南中学校)
- Sagamidai (相模台中学校)
- Shincho (新町中学校)
- Sobudai (相武台中学校)
- Soyo (相陽中学校)
- Torin (東林中学校)
- Unomori (鵜野森中学校)
- Wakakusa (若草中学校)
- Yaguchi (谷口中学校)

Municipal elementary schools:

- Araiso (新磯小学校)
- Asamizo (麻溝小学校)
- Futaba (双葉小学校)
- Kami Tsuruma (上鶴間小学校)
- Kashimadai (鹿島台小学校)
- Kunugidai (くぬぎ台小学校)
- Midoridai (緑台小学校)
- Minami Ono (南大野小学校)
- Moegidai (もえぎ台小学校)
- Ono (大野小学校)
- Onodai (大野台小学校)
- Onodai Chuo (大野台中央小学校)
- Onuma (大沼小学校)
- Sagamidai (相模台小学校)
- Sakuradai (桜台小学校)
- Sobudai (相武台小学校)
- Torin (東林小学校)
- Tsurunodai (鶴の台小学校)
- Tsuruzono (鶴園小学校)
- Wakakusa (若草小学校)
- Wakamatsu (若松小学校)
- Yaguchi (谷口小学校)
- Yaguchidai (谷口台小学校)
- Yumenooka (夢の丘小学校)
