= Yamano College of Aesthetics =

Coordinates: 35°37′16.6″N 139°20′32.4″E

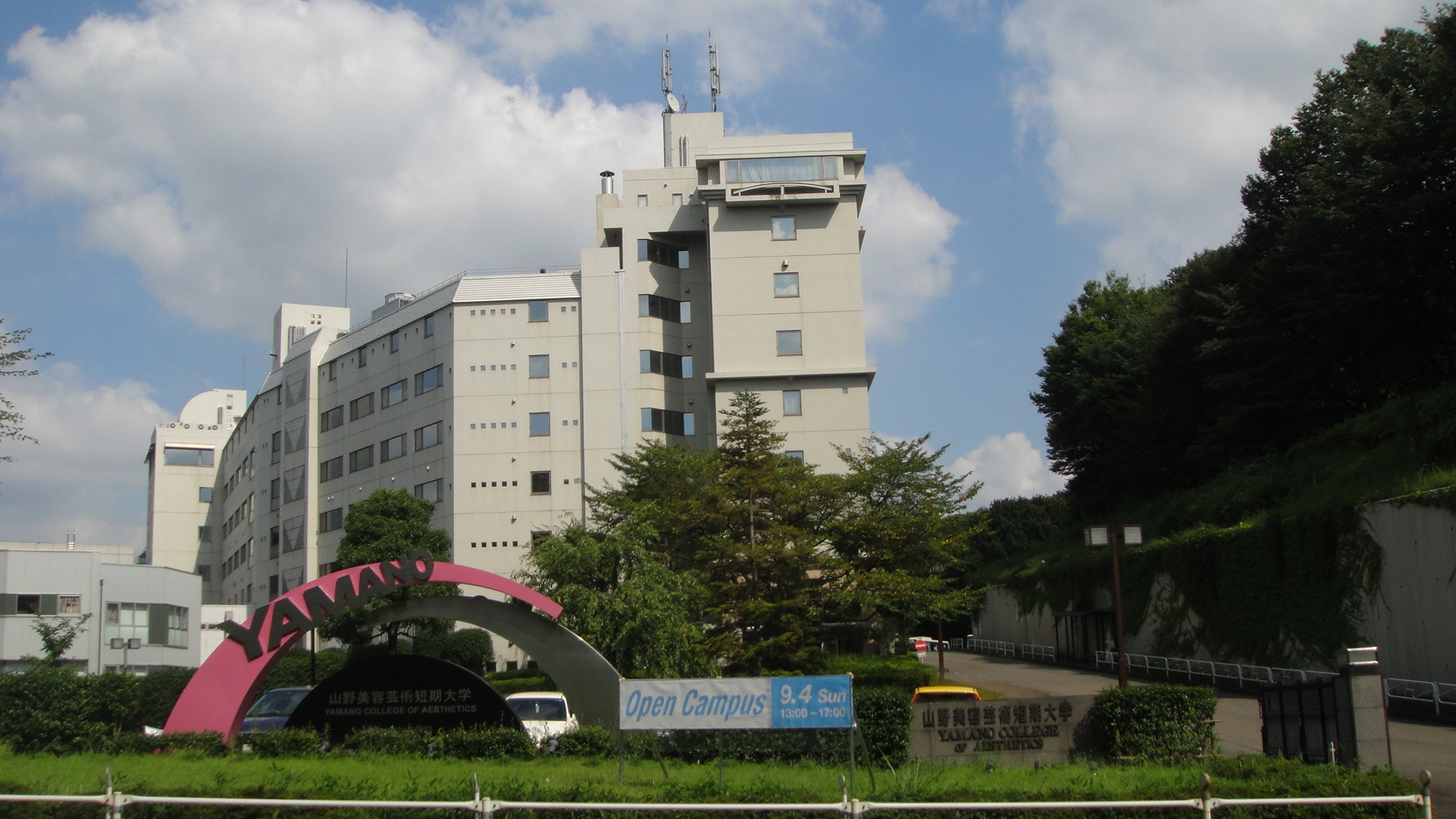
Yamano College of Aesthetics

Yamano College of Aesthetics (山野美容芸術短期大学, Yamano biyō geijutsu tanki daigaku) is a private junior college in Hachioji, Tokyo, Japan. The precursor of the school was founded in 1934, and it was chartered as a university in 1992.
