= Midori-ku, Sagamihara =

Midori 緑区
- Ward
- Midori Ward
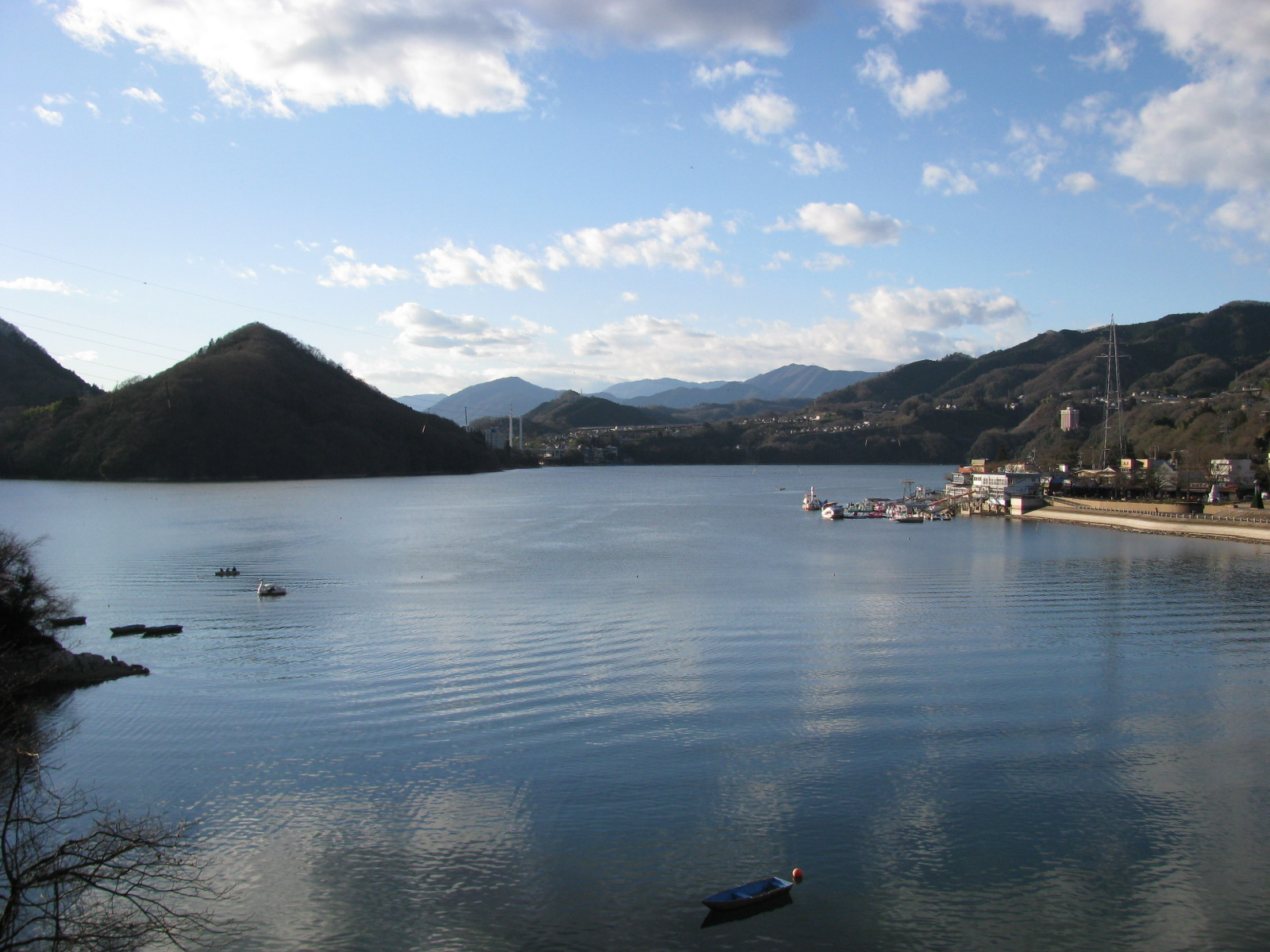
- Sagami Lake

- Seal

- Location of Midori-ku (in purple) in Sagamihara and the surrounding Kanagawa Prefecture

- Coordinates: 35°35′45″N 139°20′41″E
- Country: Japan
- Region: Kantō
- Prefecture: Kanagawa
- City: Sagamihara

Area
  - Total: 253.8 km^{2} (98.0 sq mi)

Population (March 1, 2010)
  - Total: 174,784
  - Density: 688.67/km^{2} (1,783.6/sq mi)
- Time zone: UTC+9 (Japan Standard Time)
- Phone number: 042-775-8802
- Address: 2-1, Hashimoto 6-chōme, Midori-Ku, Sagamihara-shi Kanagawa-ken 252-5177
- Website: Midori-ku home page

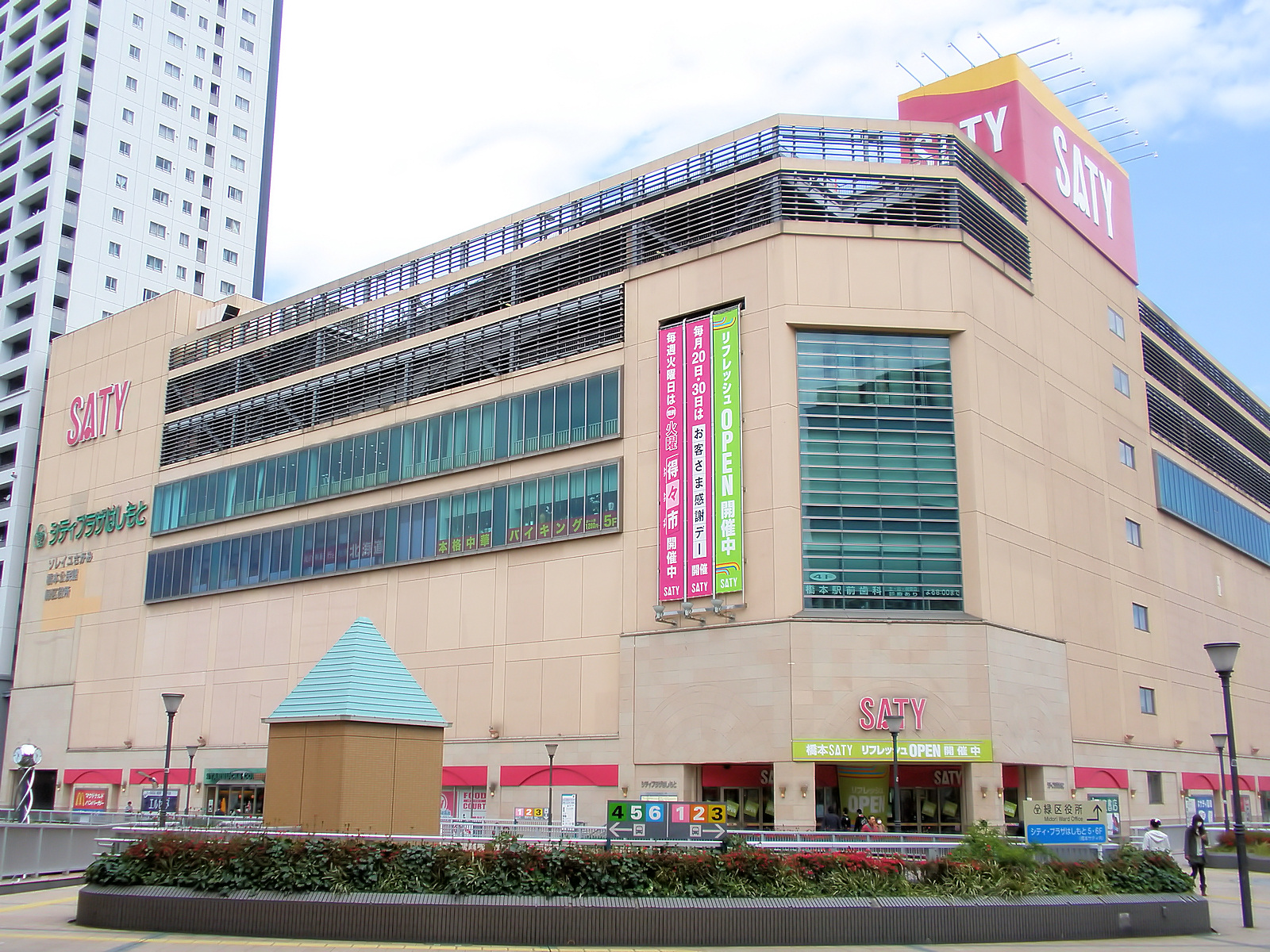
City Plaza Hashimoto, housing the Sagamihara Midori-ku Ward Office

Midori-ku (Japanese: 緑区, Hepburn: Midori-ku) is one of three wards of Sagamihara, Kanagawa, Japan. It's located in the western part of the city and covers about 77% of city's area. To the east Midori-ku faces Chūō-ku and to the north faces Machida and Hachiōji.

Midori-ku was created on April 1, 2010, when Sagamihara became a city designated by government ordinance (a "designated city").

As of March 2010, Midori-ku had a population of 174,784, with a land area of 253.8 square kilometers.

== Education ==
Municipal junior high schools:

- Aihara (相原中学校)
- Asahi (旭中学校)
- Fujino (藤野中学校)
- Hokuso (北相中学校)
- Kushikawa (串川中学校)
- Nakazawa (中沢中学校)
- Nakano (中野中学校)
- Osawa (大沢中学校)
- Sagamigaoka (相模丘中学校)
- Toya (鳥屋中学校)
- Uchide (内出中学校)
- Uchigo (内郷中学校)

Municipal elementary schools:

- Aihara (相原小学校)
- Asahi (旭小学校)
- Chigira (千木良小学校)
- Fujino (藤野小学校)
- Fujino Kita (藤野北小学校)
- Fujino Minami (藤野南小学校)
- Hashimoto (橋本小学校)
- Hirota (広田小学校)
- Kawashiri (川尻小学校)
- Keihoku (桂北小学校)
- Koryo (広陵小学校)
- Kushikawa (串川小学校)
- Kuzawa (九沢小学校)
- Miyakami (宮上小学校)
- Nakano (中野小学校)
- Negoya (根小屋小学校)
- Nihonmatsu (二本松小学校)
- Osawa (大沢小学校)
- Otori (大島小学校)
- Sakunoguchi (作の口小学校)
- Shonan (湘南小学校)
- Taimada (当麻田小学校)
- Toya (鳥屋小学校)
- Tsukui Chuo (津久井中央小学校)
- Uchigo (内郷小学校)
