= Aoba-ku, Yokohama =

Aoba 青葉区
- Ward
- Aoba Ward
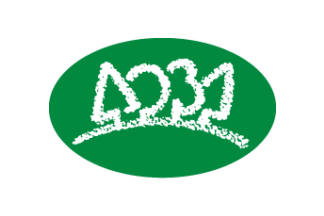
- Flag

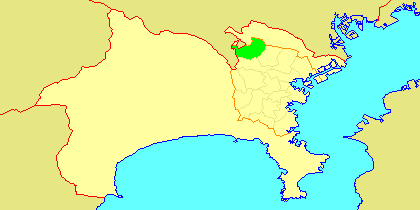
- Location of Aoba in Kanagawa
- Interactive map of Aoba
- Aoba (Japan)
- Coordinates: 35°33′10″N 139°32′14″E
- Country: Japan
- Region: Kantō
- Prefecture: Kanagawa
- City: Yokohama

Area
  - Total: 35.14 km^{2} (13.57 sq mi)

Population (February 2010)
  - Total: 302,643
  - Density: 8,610/km^{2} (22,300/sq mi)
- Time zone: UTC+9 (Japan Standard Time)
- Tree: Yamazakura
- Flower: Nashi Pear
- Address: 31-4 Ichigao-chō, Aoba-ku Yokohama-shi, Kanagawa-ken; 225-0024
- Website: Aoba Ward Office

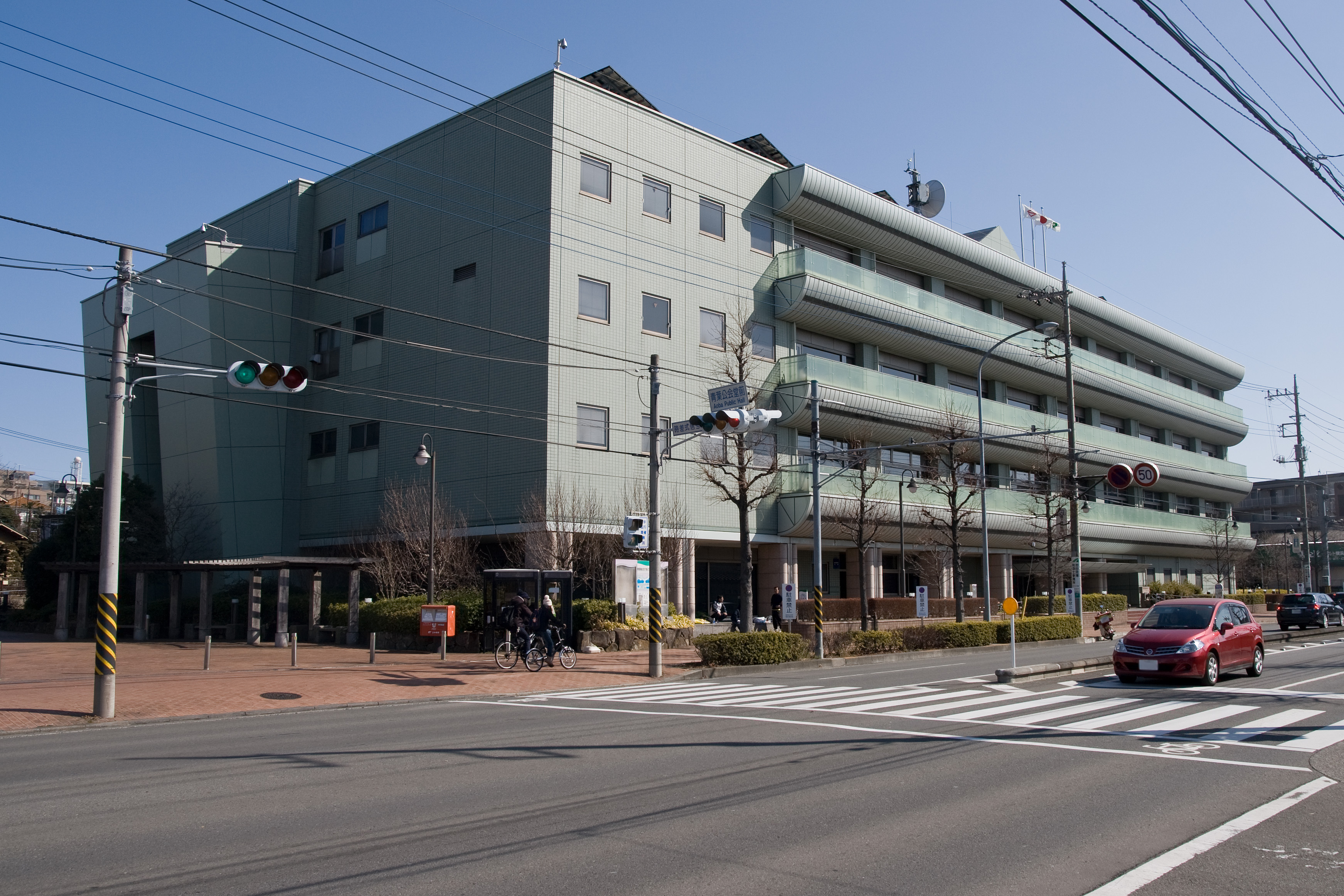
Aoba Ward Office

Aoba-ku (青葉区) is one of the 18 wards of the city of Yokohama in Kanagawa Prefecture, Japan. As of 2010, the ward had an estimated population of 302,643 and a density of 8,610 persons per km^{2}. The total area was 35.14 km^{2}.

== Geography ==
Aoba is located in eastern Kanagawa Prefecture, and in the northwest corner of the city of Yokohama. The area is largely flatland, with scattered small hills.

=== Surrounding municipalities ===
- Midori Ward
- Tsuzuki Ward
- Kawasaki
- Machida, Tokyo

== History ==
The area around present-day Aoba Ward was formerly part of Tsutsuki District in Musashi Province. During the Edo period, it was a rural region classified as tenryō territory controlled directly by the Tokugawa shogunate, but administered through various hatamoto. After the Meiji Restoration, the area became part of the new Kanagawa Prefecture in 1868. In the cadastral reform of April 1, 1889, the area was divided into the villages of Tana, Nakazato and Yamauchi in Tsuzuki District (都筑郡田奈村, 中里村, 山内村, Tsuzuki-gun Tana-mura, Nakazato-mura, Yamauchi-mura). During the Meiji period, the area was a center for sericulture. On April 1, 1939, the three villages within Tsutsuki District were annexed by the neighboring city of Yokohama, becoming part of Kōhoku-ku.

In a major administrative reorganization of October 1, 1969, Kōhoku Ward was divided, and the present-day area of Aoba Ward became part of the new Midori-ku. On November 6, 1994, Kōhoku and Midori Wards were recombined, then re-divided into four new Wards (Kōhoku, Midori, Tsuzuki and Aoba). The North Branch of the Midori Ward Office in Ichigao became the new Aoba Ward Office. The division and re-division of Wards has much to do with the development of northern Yokohama by railroad companies. The opening of the Tōkyū Den-en-toshi Line and associated "Tama Den-en-toshi" (東急多摩田園都市, Tōkyū Tama Den'en-toshi) residential communities led to the rapid suburban development in this region. This was followed by the Kōhoku New Town (港北ニュータウン, Kōhoku Nyūtaun) project in the 1980s and early 1990s. The core of the Kōhoku New Town became a significant commercial centre once the subway line extension between Shin-Yokohama and Azamino was completed in 1993. The influx of new population resulted in the entire “Kōhoku New Town” being re-organized into the new Tsuzuki Ward.

== Emblem of Aoba Ward ==
The emblem of Aoba Ward was officially announced on November 6, 1996, to commemorate the birth of Aoba Ward. The emblem was chosen from a number of designs submitted by residents. The trees and different shapes inside the green oval spell "AOBA." The hill symbolizes the geographic location of Aoba Ward. This emblem signifies the warmth that the nature gives to human beings.

== Economy ==
Aoba Ward is largely a regional commercial center and bedroom community for central Yokohama, Kawasaki and Tokyo. The major commercial centres are around the Aobadai (青葉台, Aoba-dai) and Tama Plaza (たまプラーザ, Tama Purāza) stations. The far-northern end of Aoba and the Yamoto River (谷本川, Yamoto-gawa) valley area retained some residual agriculture into the 1990s, when real-estate developers converted much of the farmlands and orchards into subdivisions and condominiums.

== Transportation ==
=== Railways ===
- Tokyu Corporation - Tōkyū Den-en-toshi Line
  - Tama-Plaza - Azamino - Eda - Ichigao - Fujigaoka - Aobadai - Tana
- Yokohama Minatomirai Railway-Yokohama Minatomirai Railway Kodomonokuni Line
  - Onda - Kodomonokuni
- Yokohama City Transportation Bureau - Blue Line
  - Azamino

=== Highways ===
- Tōmei Expressway
- Yokohama Northwest Route
- National Route 246

==== Prefecture roads ====
- Kanagawa Prefecture Road 12
- Kanagawa Prefecture Road 13
- Kanagawa Prefecture Road 102
- Kanagawa Prefecture Road 139
- Kanagawa Prefecture Road 140

== Education ==
Tertiary education:

- Toin University of Yokohama
- Nippon Sport Science University
- Caritas Junior College
- Yokohama College of Art and Design

Yokohama Municipal Board of Education operates public elementary and junior high schools.

Kanagawa Prefectural Board of Education operates prefectural high schools.

- Ichigao Senior High School
- Motoishikawa Senior High School
- Tana Senior High School

Public junior high schools:

- Akanedai (あかね台)
- Aobadai (青葉台)
- Azamino (あざみ野)
- Ichigao (市ヶ尾)
- Kamoshida (鴨志田)
- Midorigaoka (緑が丘)
- Mitakedai (みたけ台)
- Moegino (もえぎ野)
- Nara (奈良)
- Susukino (すすき野)
- Utsukushigaoka (美しが丘)
- Yamauchi (山内)
- Yamoto (谷本)

Public elementary schools:

- Aobadai (青葉台)
- Azamino Daiichi (No. 1) (あざみ野第一)
- Azamino Daini (No. 2) (あざみ野第二)
- Edanishi (West) (荏田西)
- Ekoda (荏子田)
- Enokigaoka (榎が丘)
- Fujigaoka (藤が丘)
- Ichigao (市ケ尾)
- Kamoshida Daiichi (鴨志田第一)
- Kamoshida Midori (鴨志田緑)
- Katsura (桂)
- Kenzan (嶮山)
- Kurogane (鉄)
- Kurosuda (黒須田)
- Mitakedai (みたけ台)
- Motoishikawa (元石川)
- Nara (奈良)
- Onda (恩田)
- Satsukigaoka (さつきが丘)
- Shinishikawa (新石川)
- Tana (田奈)
- Tsutsujigaoka (つつじが丘)
- Utsukushigaoka (美しが丘)
- Utsukushigaoka Higashi (East) (美しが丘東)
- Utsukushigaoka Nishi (美しが丘西)
- Yamauchi (山内)
- Yamoto (谷本)

Eda Elementary School (荏田小学校) and Nakagawa Nishi Elementary School (中川西小学校), outside of Aoba-ku, include portions of Aoba-ku in their attendance zones.

== Local attractions ==
- Kodomonokuni Theme Park

== Notable people from Aoba Ward ==
- Kō Itakura, football/soccer player
- Tomoya Nagase, singer, actor
- Hiroshi Nakada, politician
- Genki Omae, football/soccer player
- Emi Wakui, actress
- Shin Yamada, football/soccer player
- Tsukasa Saito, comedian
