= Fujigaoka Station =

Fujigaoka Station (藤が丘駅) is the name of two train stations in Japan:

- Fujigaoka Station (Nagoya) in Nagoya, Aichi Prefecture.
- Fujigaoka Station (Kanagawa)
