= Ichigao Station =

Railway station in Yokohama, Japan

Ichigao Station 市が尾駅

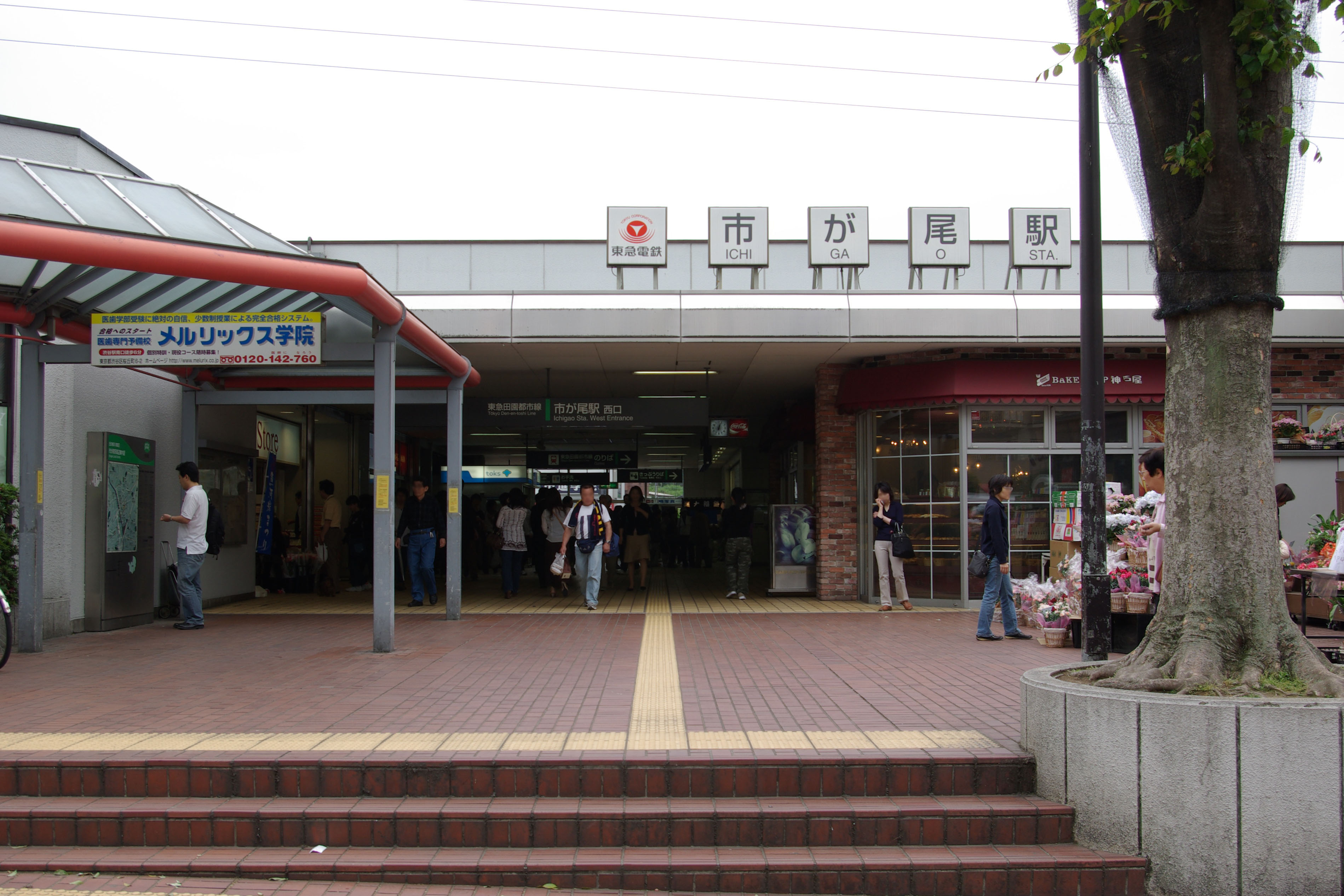
- The west entrance in May 2007

General information
- Location: 1156-1 Ichigao-cho, Aoba-ku, Yokohama-shi, Kanagawa-ken 225-0024; Japan
- Coordinates: 35.5516°N 139.5416°E
- Operator: Tōkyū Railways
- Line: Den-en-toshi Line
- Distance: 20.6 km (12.8 mi) from Shibuya
- Platforms: 2 side platforms
- Tracks: 2
- Connections: Bus terminal

Construction
- Structure type: At grade
- Accessible: Yes

Other information
- Station code: DT18
- Website: Official website

History
- Opened: 1 April 1966; 60 years ago

Passengers
- FY2019: 43,403

Services
Preceding station	Tōkyū Railways	Following station
Fujigaoka towards Chūō-rinkan	Den-en-toshi Line Local	Eda towards Shibuya
Location
- Location within Yokohama Location within Kanagawa Prefecture Location within Tokyo Bay and Bōsō Peninsula Location within Japan

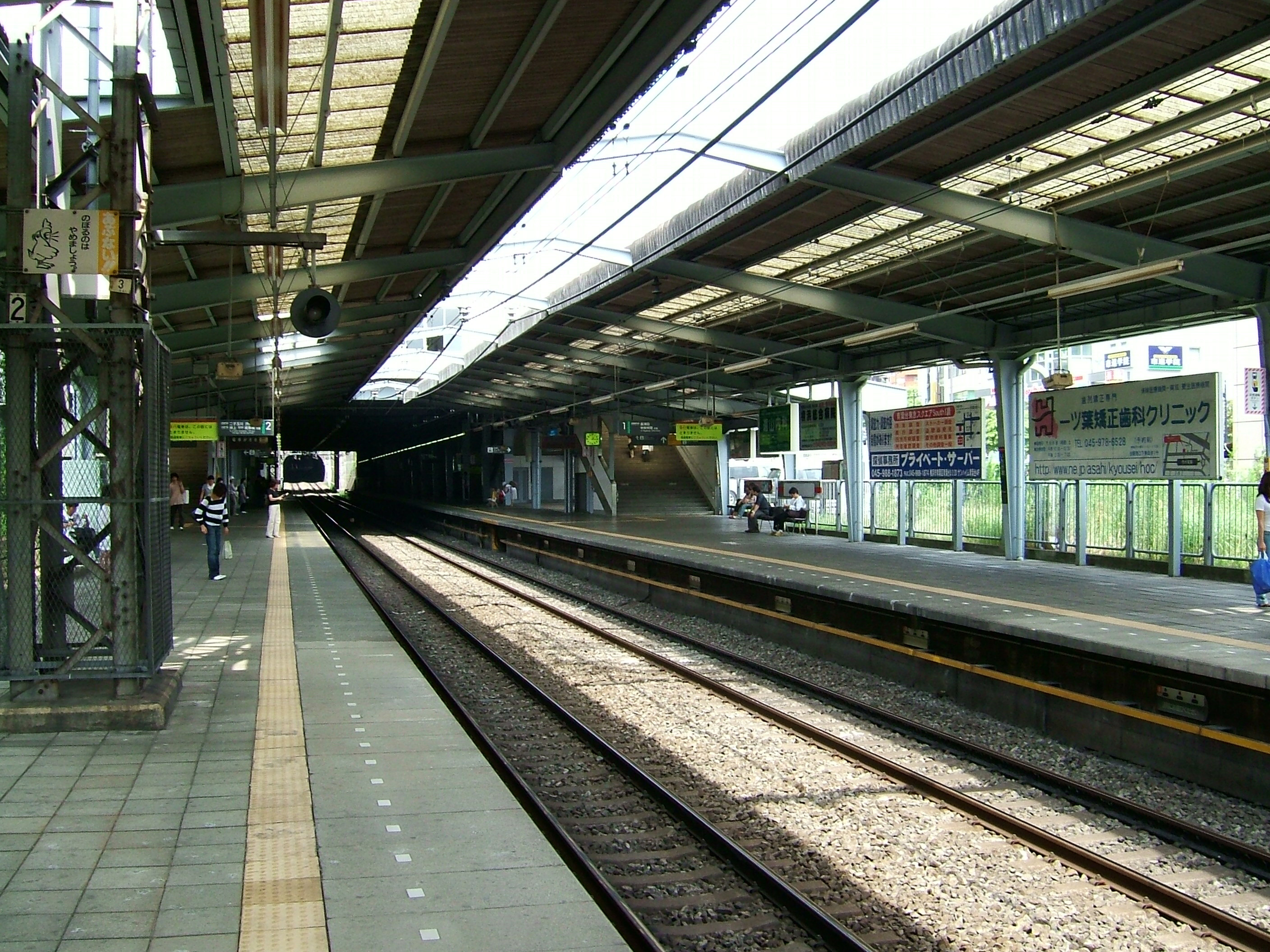
The platforms in August 2004

Ichigao Station (市が尾駅, Ichigao-eki) is a passenger railway station located in Aoba-ku, Yokohama, Kanagawa Prefecture, Japan, operated by the private railway company Tokyu Corporation.

== Lines ==
Ichigao Station is served by the Tōkyū Den-en-toshi Line from Shibuya in Tokyo to Chūō-rinkan in Kanagawa Prefecture. It is 20.6 kilometers from the terminus of the line at Shibuya.

== Station layout ==
The station consists of two opposed side platforms serving two tracks with an elevated station building built over the platforms.

=== Platforms ===
1	■ Tokyu Den-en-toshi Line	for Nagatsuta and Chūō-rinkan
2	■ Tokyu Den-en-toshi Line	for Futako-tamagawa and Shibuya; Tokyo Metro Hanzomon Line for Oshiage; Tobu Skytree Line for Kasukabe

== History ==
- April 1, 1966 (Showa 41): Ichigao Station opened with the extension of the Den-en-toshi Line between Mizonokuchi Station and Nagatsuta Station.
- June 1979 (Showa 54): Elevated station building completed and a free passageway constructed.
- April 1, 2015 (Heisei 27): The east entrance was renovated in conjunction with the East Exit station building project. At the same time, the station-adjacent commercial facility Etomo Ichigao opened.
- 2017 (Heisei 29):
  - September 21: Platform screen doors installed on Track 2.
  - October 29: Platform screen doors on Track 2 placed into operation.
  - November 19: Platform screen doors installed on Track 1.
  - December 24: Platform screen doors on Track 1 placed into operation.

=== Station Name ===
The station name is derived from the local place name. While the area is written as 「市ケ尾」 (Ichigao), the station name is written as 「市が尾」 (Ichigao). This difference arises from a policy implemented in January 1966, prior to the station’s opening, in which non-Tōyō kanji (present-day Jōyō kanji) and katakana used in station names on the Tōkyū Lines were replaced with hiragana. As a result, characters such as 「ヶ」 and 「ノ」 were changed to 「が」 and 「の」, respectively.

== Passenger statistics ==
In fiscal 2019, the station was used by an average of 43,403 passengers daily.

The passenger figures for previous years are as shown below.

Fiscal year	daily average
2005	44,497
2010	43,181
2015	44,121

== Surrounding area ==
- Aoba Ward Office
- Ichigao Cave Tomb Cluster
- Toin University of Yokohama

== See also ==
- List of railway stations in Japan
