= Aoba-ku =

Aoba-ku (青葉区) may refer to:

- Aoba-ku, Yokohama, in Japan
- Aoba-ku, Sendai, in Japan
