= Kodomonokuni Station (Kanagawa) =

Railway station in Yokohama, Japan

Coordinates: 35°33′30.16″N 139°29′10.97″E

Kodomonokuni Station こどもの国駅

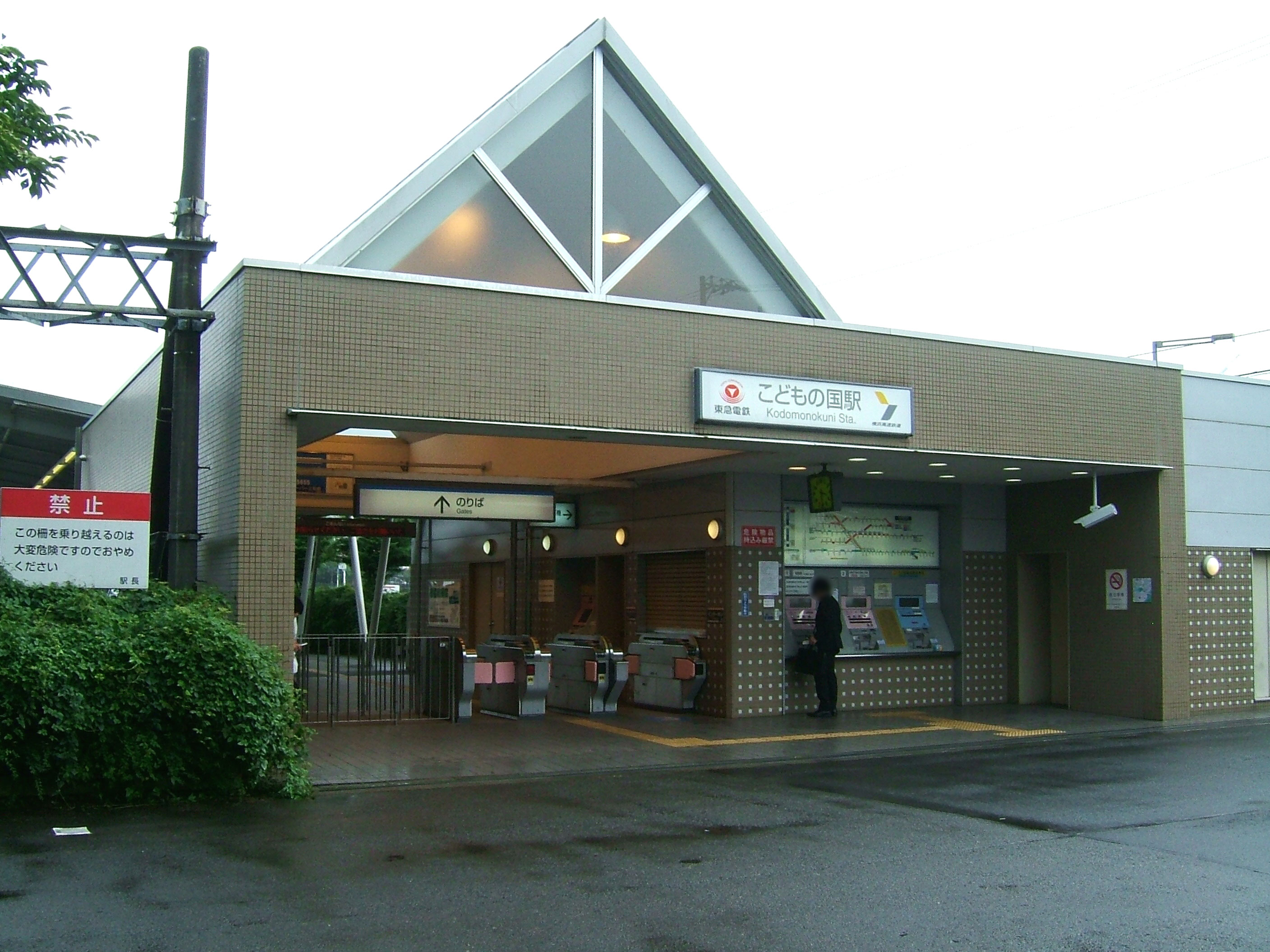
- Kodomonokuni Station

General information
- Location: Nara-cho, Aoba Ward, Yokohama City; Kanagawa Prefecture （横浜市青葉区奈良町） Japan
- Operator: Yokohama Minatomirai Railway
- Line: Kodomonokuni Line
- Platforms: 1 side platform
- Tracks: 1

Construction
- Structure type: At grade

Other information
- Station code: KD03

History
- Opened: 28 April 1967; 59 years ago

Passengers
- 2008: 10,293 daily

Services
Preceding station	Tōkyū Railways	Following station
Terminus	Kodomonokuni Line	Onda towards Nagatsuta
Location
- Location within Yokohama Location within Kanagawa Prefecture Location within Japan

Kodomonokuni Station (こどもの国駅, Kodomonokuni-eki) is the terminal railway station operated by Yokohama Minatomirai Railway's Kodomonokuni Line located in the Aoba-ku, Yokohama, Kanagawa Prefecture, Japan. It is located next to the Kodomonokuni Theme Park.

== History ==
Kodomonokuni Station was opened on April 18, 1967.

== Lines ==
- Yokohama Minatomirai Railway
  - Kodomonokuni Line

== Station layout ==
Kodomonokuni Station has an elevated side platform serving one track for bi-directional traffic. The station is normally unattended.

=== Platforms ===
1	■Kodomonokuni Line	for Nagatsuta
