= Onda Station =

Railway station in Yokohama, Japan

Coordinates: 35.5456°N 139.4923°E

Onda Station 恩田駅

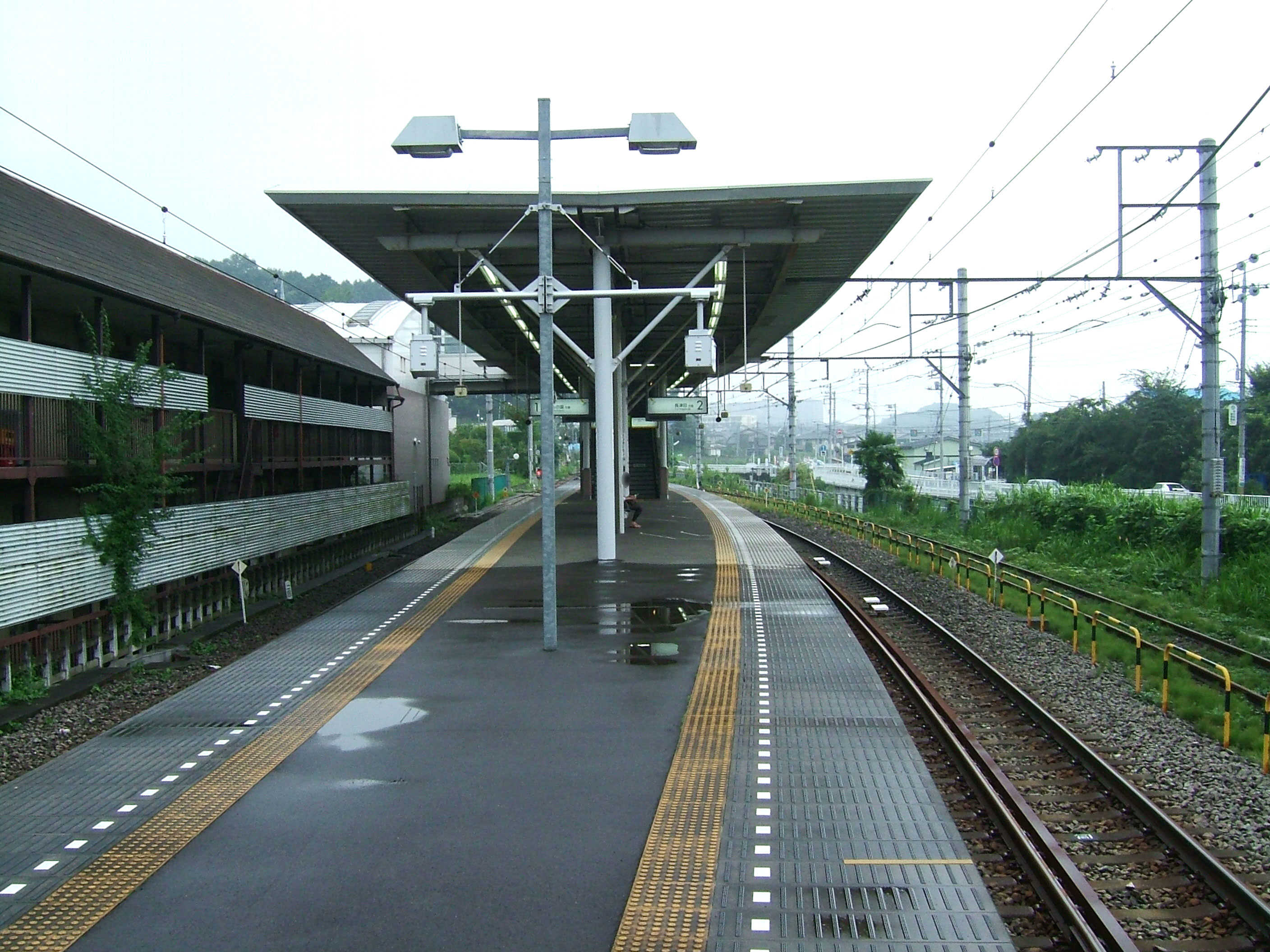
- Platform

General information
- Location: Akanedai 1-10, Aoba Ward, Yokohama City; Kanagawa Prefecture （横浜市青葉区あかね台1-10） Japan
- Operator: Yokohama Minatomirai Railway
- Line: Kodomonokuni Line
- Platforms: 1 island platform
- Tracks: 2

Construction
- Structure type: At grade

Other information
- Station code: KD02

History
- Opened: 29 March 2000; 26 years ago

Passengers
- 2008: 848 daily

Services
Preceding station	Tōkyū Railways	Following station
Kodomonokuni Terminus	Kodomonokuni Line	Nagatsuta Terminus
Location
- Location within Yokohama Location within Kanagawa Prefecture Location within Japan

Onda Station (恩田駅, Onda-eki) is a railway station operated by Yokohama Minatomirai Railway's Kodomonokuni Line located in Aoba-ku, Yokohama, Kanagawa Prefecture, Japan. It is 1.8 kilometers from the terminus of the Kodomonokuni Line at Nagatsuta Station.

== History ==
Onda Station was opened on March 29, 2000.

== Lines ==
- Yokohama Minatomirai Railway
  - Kodomonokuni Line

== Station layout ==
Onda Station has an elevated island platform serving two tracks. The station building is normally unattended.

=== Platforms ===
1	■ Kodomonokuni Line	Kodomonokuni
2	■ Kodomonokuni Line	Nagatsuta
