= Kurosawa Film Studio =

Japanese film studio

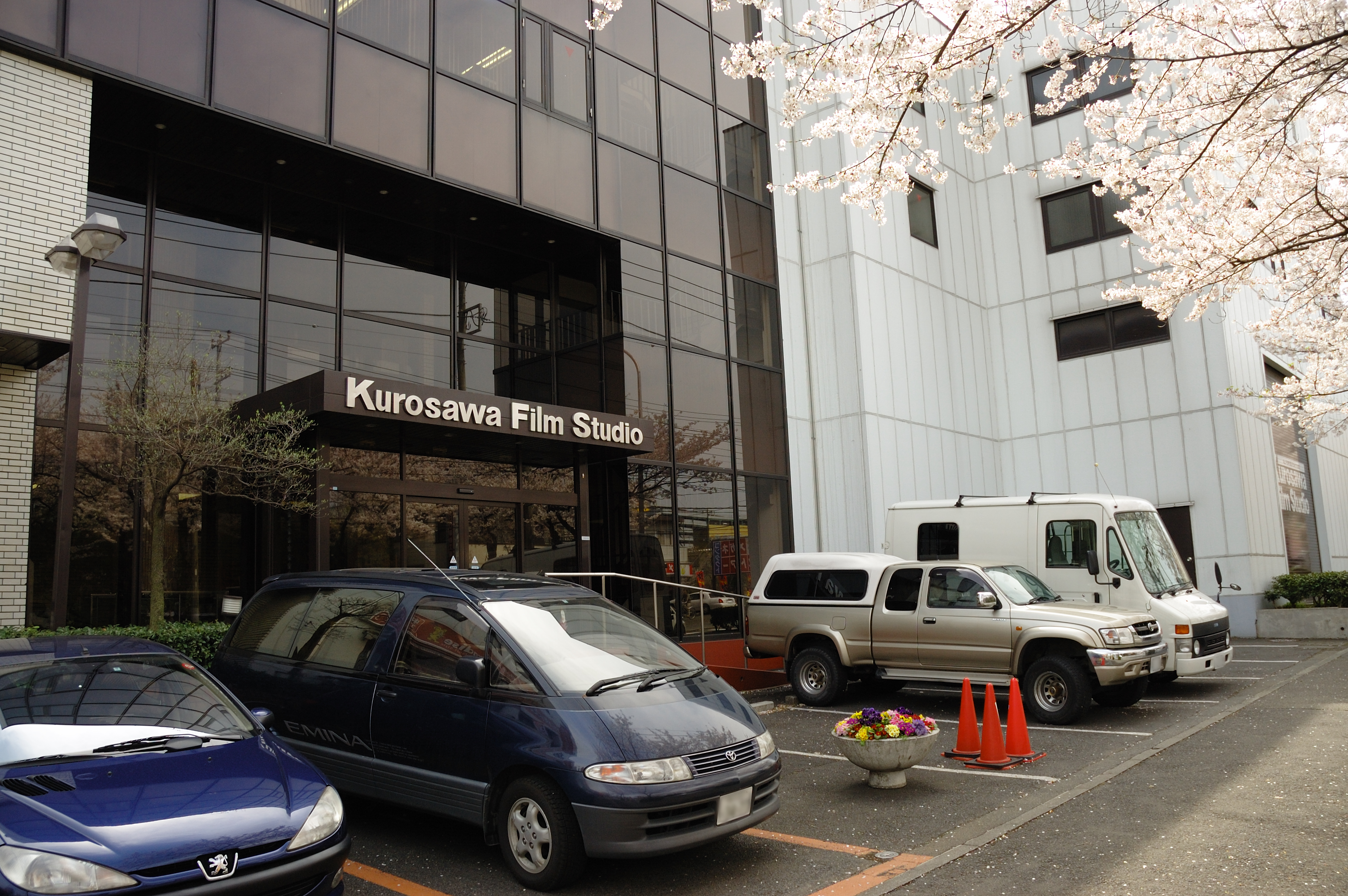
Kurosawa Film Studio - Midori ward, Yokohama

The Kurosawa Film Studio consists of three studios that were founded by the movie director Akira Kurosawa and are located in Japan.

- Yokohama Studio
- Tomei Kawasaki Studio
- Yokohama Kizai Center

The Yokohama Studio is located in Midori ward of Yokohama city in the Kirigaoka suburb. It was completed on November 1, 1983. One of the films produced in the studio is Akira Kurosawa's Dreams.
