= Caritas Junior College =

Private women's college in Yokohama, Japan

Coordinates: 35°34′07″N 139°32′47″E

- カリタス女子短期大学
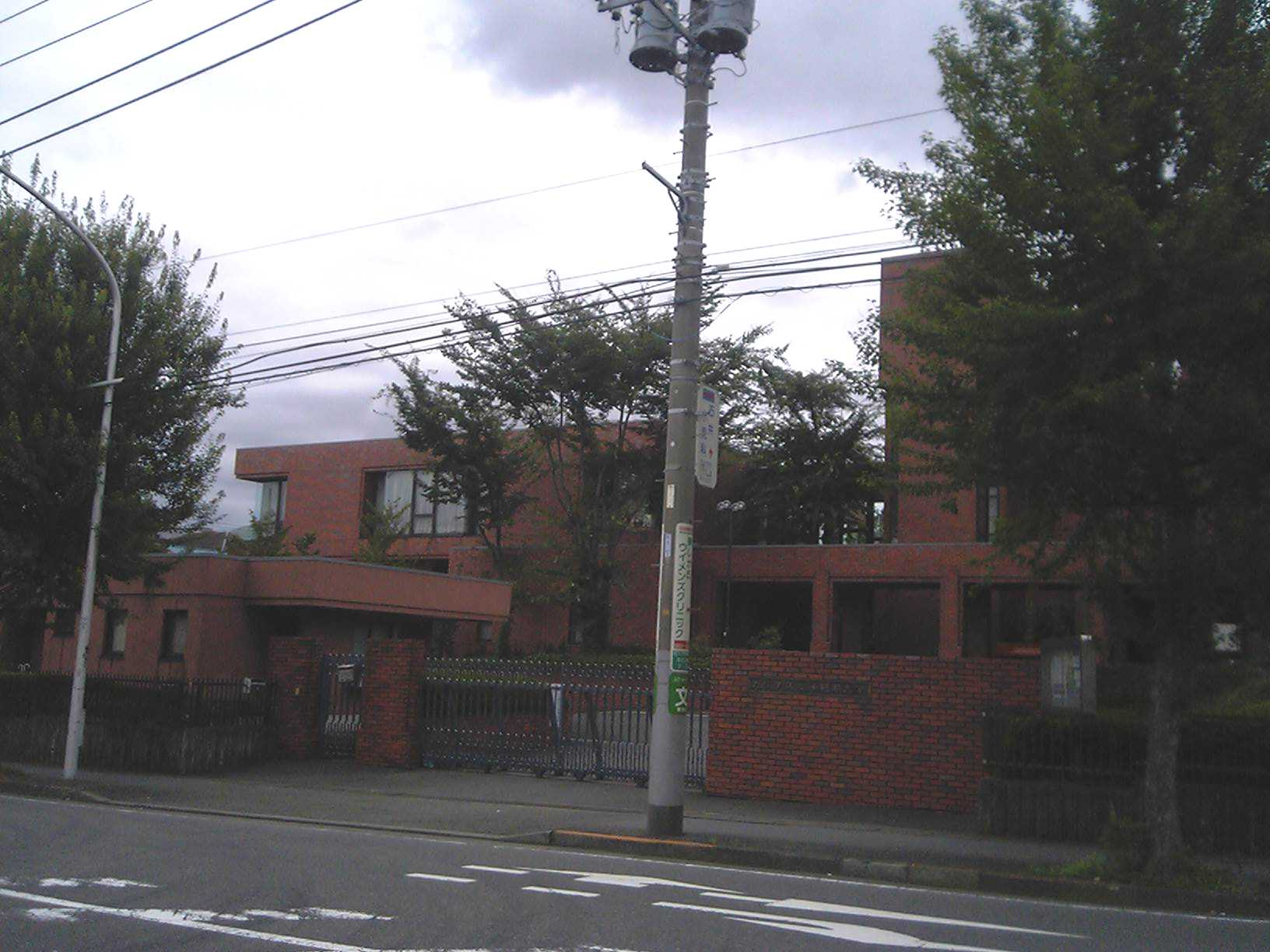
- Type: Private
- Established: 1966
- Location: Aoba-ku, Yokohama, Kanagawa, Japan
- Website: www.caritas.ac.jp

Caritas Junior College (カリタス女子短期大学, Karitasu joshi tanki daigaku) was a private Roman Catholic women's junior college in Yokohama, Kanagawa, Japan, established in 1966. It concentrated on French and English foreign language studies and the only Junior College that offers both English and French subjects in Japan at the time its of foundation.

Enrollment in the school was suspended on 2015 due to under-enrollment due to Japan's declining birth rate. It eventually closed on 2017.
