= Yokohama Northwest Route =

Expressway in the Tokyo area

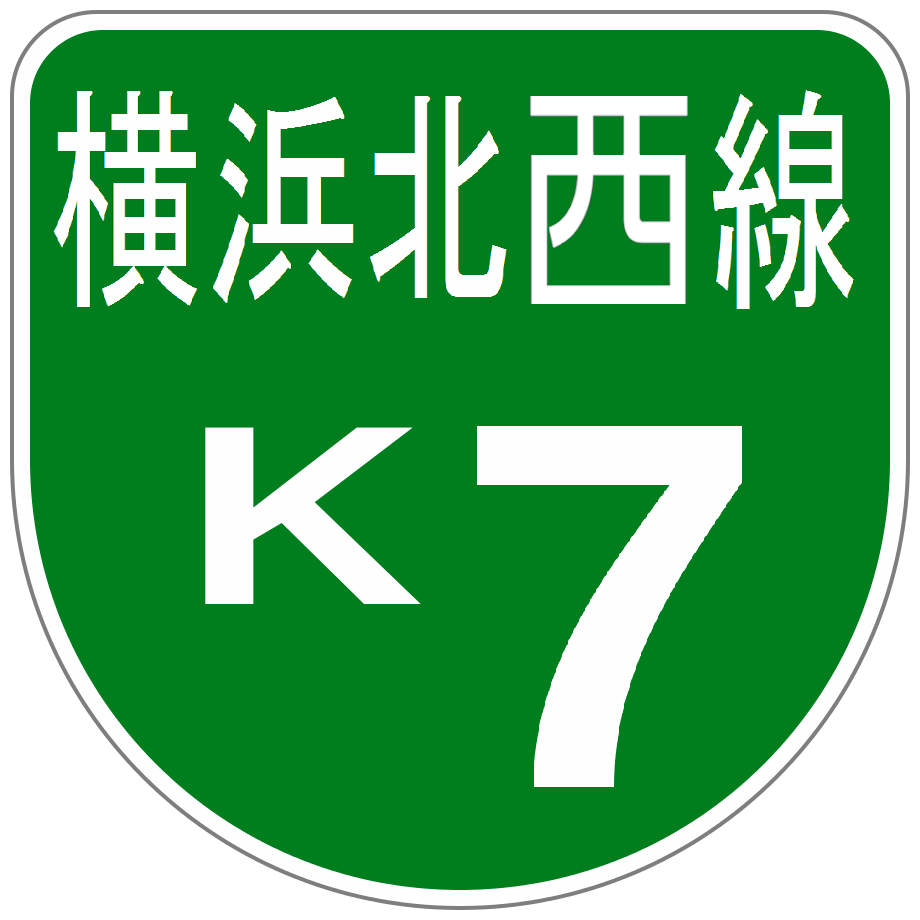
Shuto Expressway Yokohama Northwest Route 首都高速神奈川7号横浜北西線
- Yokohama Northwest Route highlighted in red

Route information
- Maintained by Metropolitan Expressway Company Limited
- Length: 7.1 km (4.4 mi)
- Existed: 2020–present

Major junctions
- East end: Yokohama-Kōhoku Junction in Tsuzuki-ku, Yokohama; Daisan Keihin Road; Yokohama North Route
- West end: Yokohama-Aoba Junction in Aoba-ku, Yokohama; Tōmei Expressway; National Route 246

Location
- Country: Japan

Highway system
- National highways of Japan; Expressways of Japan

The Yokohama Northwest Route (横浜北西線, Yokohama-hokusei-sen), signed as Route K7, is one of the tolled routes of the Shuto Expressway system serving the Greater Tokyo Area and is one of seven of the routes in the system serving Kanagawa Prefecture. The route is a 7.1-kilometer-long (4.4 mi) expressway running west from a junction with the Tōmei Expressway in Aoba-ku, Yokohama, to the Daisan Keihin Road in Tsuzuki-ku, Yokohama. Alongside the Yokohama North Route and the Daikoku Route, it connects the Tōmei Expressway in northern Yokohama to the region-spanning Bayshore Route.

== Route description ==
The Yokohama Northwest Route begins at Yokohama-Kōhoku Junction in Tsuzuki-ku, Yokohama, where it meets the Yokohama North Route and Daisan Keihin Road. From there it travels west through Tsuzuki-ku where it enters a tunnel that carries the majority of the length of the expressway. The tunnel, named the Yokohama-hokusei Tunnel, has a length of 4.1 kilometers (2.5 mi). The tunnel is equipped with emergency escape slides to facilitate its evacuation. Just outside of the western entrance to the tunnel the expressway enters Aoba-ku. The expressway meets its western terminus in the ward at a junction with the Tōmei Expressway. With the completion of the expressway, travel times between the Tōmei Expressway and the Bayshore Route are expected to be shortened by 20 to 40 minutes.

The speed limit along the entire length of the Yokohama Northwest Route is set at 60 km/h.

== History ==
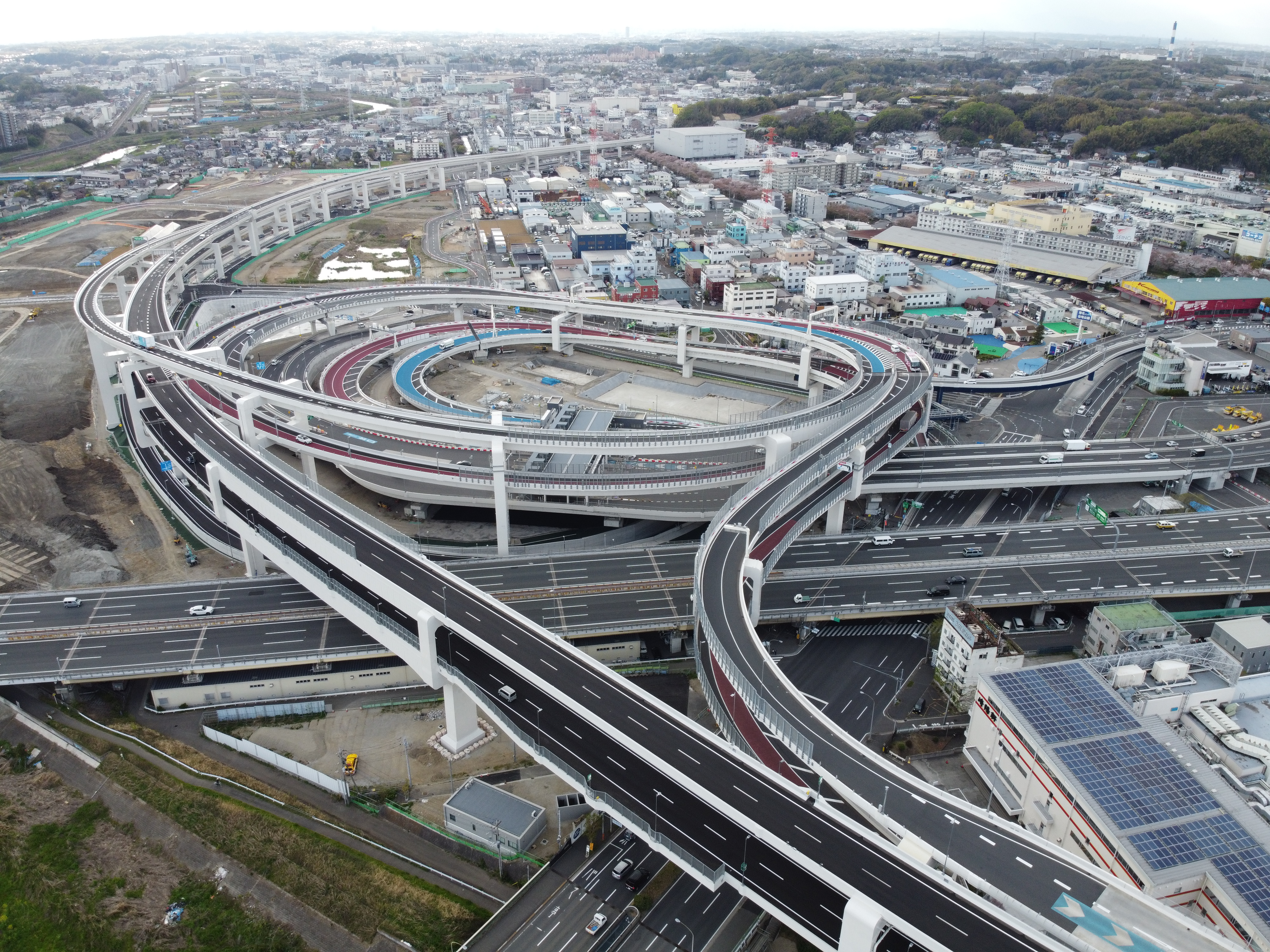
Yokohama-Kōhoku Junction, the eastern terminus of the expressway.

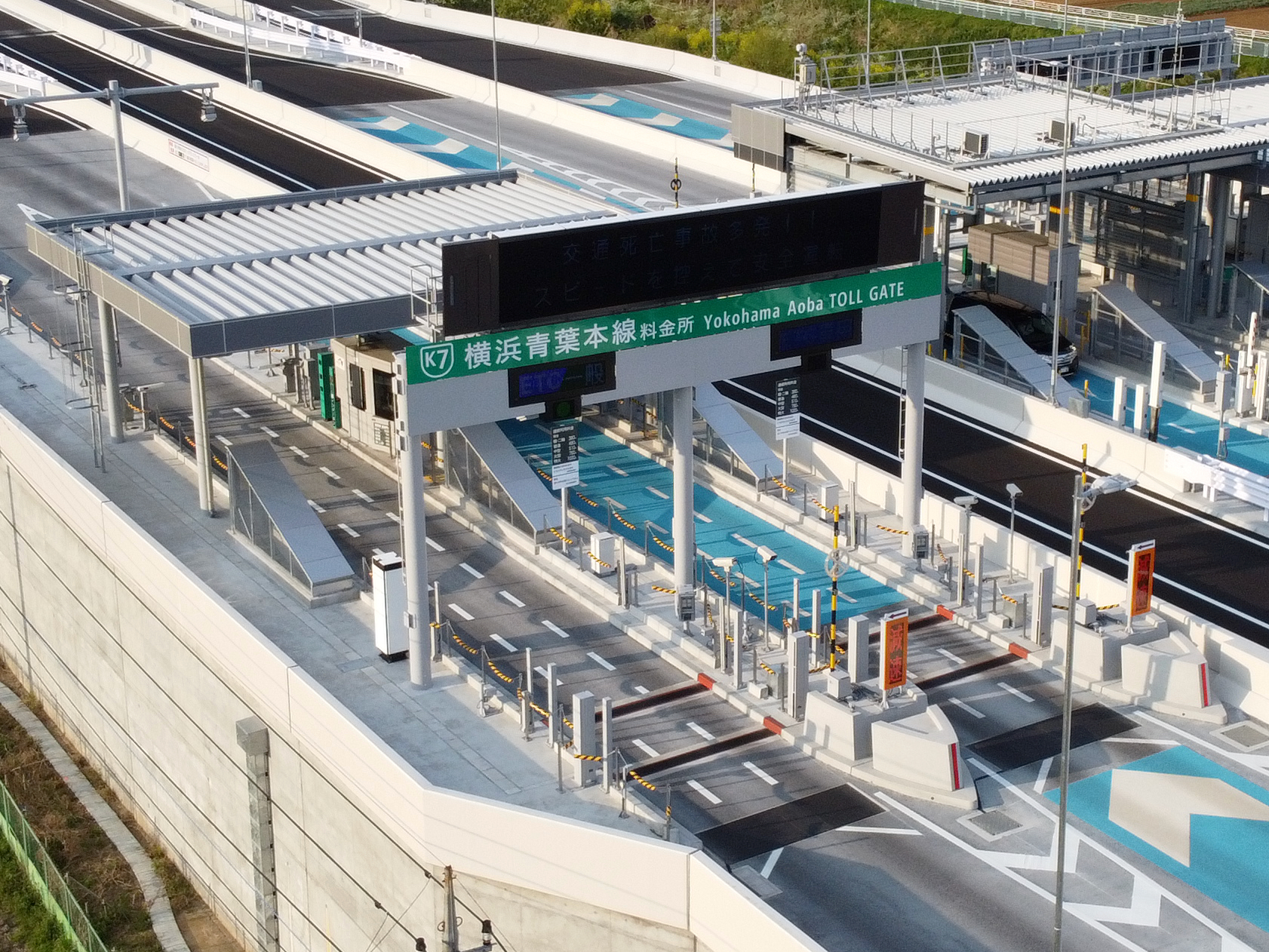
Aerial view of the western exit toll gates of the expressway.

Planning for the expressway began in August 2002 when the Ministry of Land, Infrastructure, Transport and Tourism held a public meeting for local residents on where the expressway should be placed. It was the first time residents had a say in where an expressway would be put in Japan, following precedents set in the United States and Europe. Construction plans were finalized in 2011 and sent to the prefectural government to be approved.

Construction of the expressway commenced on 7 November 2014, two years after the plans for its construction were approved by the government of Kanagawa Prefecture. After the approval of the plans, the government emphasized their desire for the expressway to be completed prior to the 2020 Summer Olympics, though the games would later be rescheduled to be held in the summer of 2021.

The Yokohama Northwest Route was scheduled to open on 22 March 2020 with celebratory events to be held leading up to the opening, such as a run down the newly built expressway. Due to the COVID-19 pandemic, these events were cancelled, but the opening of the expressway to traffic was not delayed. The route opened on schedule at 4:00 p.m. on 22 March 2020.

== Junction list ==
The entire expressway lies within Yokohama in Kanagawa Prefecture

| Location | km | mi | Exit | Name | Destinations | Notes |
|---|---|---|---|---|---|---|
| Tsuzuki-ku | 0.0 | 0.0 | 757/758 | Yokohama-Kōhoku | Daisan Keihin Road; Yokohama North Route – to Bayshore Route, Yokohama-kōen | Eastern terminus, the expressway continues east as the Yokohama North Route |
| Aoba-ku | 7.1 | 4.4 | 759 | Yokohama-Aoba | Tōmei Expressway – Shizuoka, Tokyo; National Route 246 – Atsugi, Shibuya | Western terminus; E1 exit 3-1 |
1.000 mi = 1.609 km; 1.000 km = 0.621 mi: Route transition
