= Kodomonokuni Theme Park =

Amusement park in Yokohama, Japan

Coordinates: 35.562325°N 139.491424°E

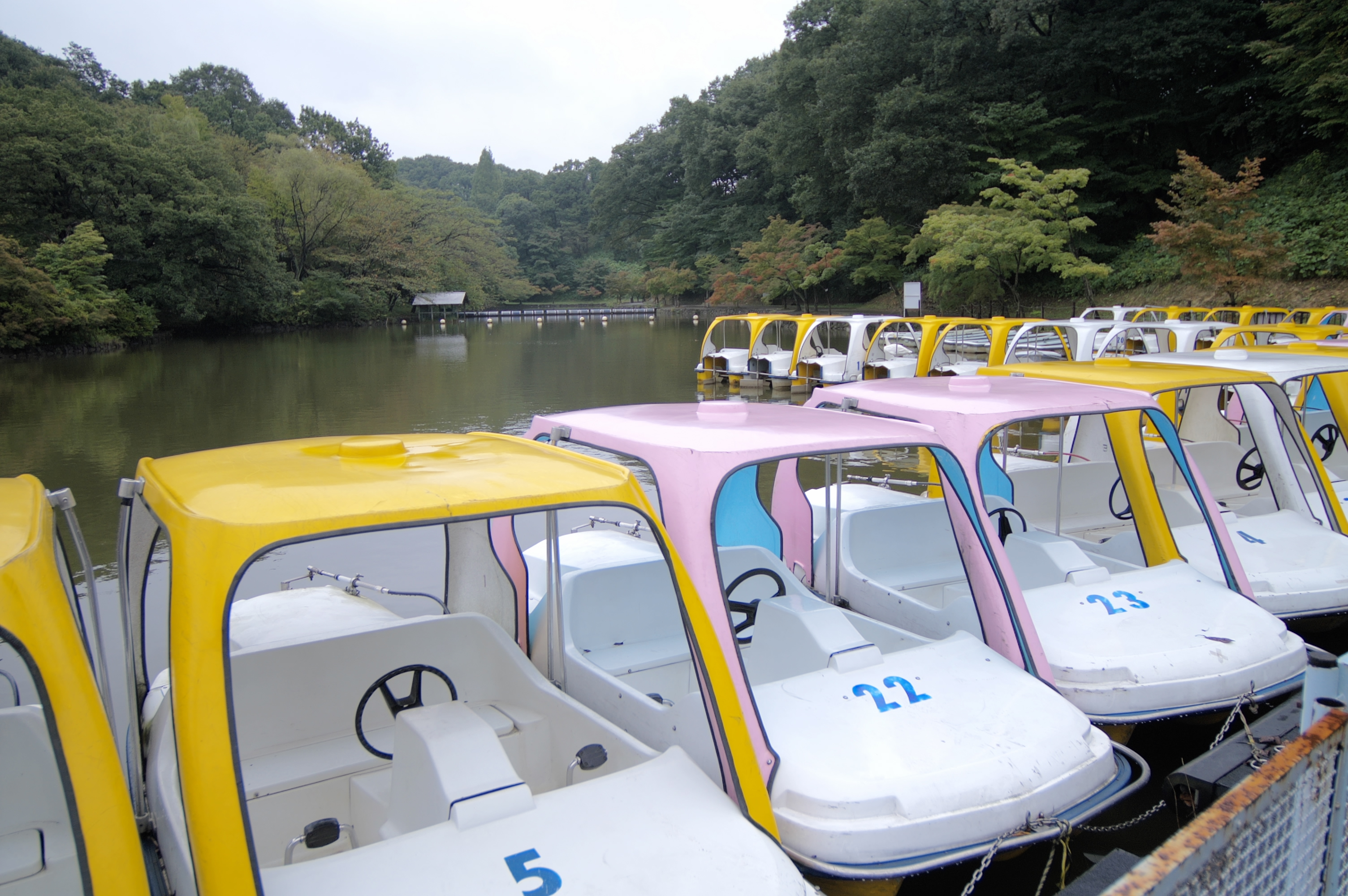
Colorful boats at Kodomonokuni

Kodomonokuni Theme Park (こどもの国) is an amusement park in Yokohama, Japan, near Tokyo. The park's name means Children's Country. As the name implies, it is more oriented towards young children than teenagers. It was founded in commemoration of the Royal Marriage of Prince Akihito and Princess Michiko in 1959 (who reigned as Emperor and Empress from 1989 to 2019), and it was officially opened on May 5, a national holiday of the Children's Day, in 1965. The park is approximately 240 acres (97 ha), and includes such things as a children's petting zoo, a boating lake, and a barbecue site.

It can be accessed by train from the Tokyu Corporation's Kodomonokuni Line, Kodomonokuni Station, or from Aobadai Station or Tsurukawa Station by bus.

== Facilities ==
The park covers an extensive area of approximately 100 hectares, incorporating facilities that make use of the natural features of the Tama Hills.

Soft-serve ice cream and the specialty milk product Sun Green, both made from milk obtained from dairy cows raised on the park's farm, are well-known local specialties. The farm is managed and operated by Snow Brand Kodomonokuni Farm Co., Ltd., an affiliate of Megmilk Snow Brand, under commission from the Kodomonokuni Association.

=== Major facilities ===
- Nature Training Center

Accommodation is available for group use.

- Barbecue Area

Beer purchased within the area may only be consumed on-site. Alcohol consumption is prohibited in all other areas of the park.

- Hakuchōko (Swan Lake)

Rowboats and rafts are available for rent.

- Tsubaki no Mori (Forest of Camellia)

This grove features a collection originally assembled by Chōka Adachi, which was later purchased by Shiseido and donated to the park.

- Heisei Memorial Hall (formerly Crown Prince Memorial Hall)

Constructed in 1972 (Showa 47), the facility was originally named the “Crown Prince’s Wedding Memorial Hall” (commonly referred to as the Crown Prince Memorial Hall). Following major renovations, in May 2021 (Reiwa 3) the official name was changed to the “Crown Prince Akihito Wedding Memorial Hall” (commonly known as the Heisei Memorial Hall). During its period as the Crown Prince Memorial Hall, the building housed a hall with 420 seats beneath a large roof, used for music recitals and ceremonies. After renovation, the first-floor hall was removed and the interior was converted into a spacious open area, part of which can be reserved for private use.

- Playground Equipment Area

Playground equipment within the park, including this area, was primarily donated by the Japan Lottery Association.

- Outdoor Swimming Pools and Ice Skating Rink

The facility includes two deep pools, four shallow pools, two types of water slides, and a 25-meter swimming pool. In winter, the rest area beneath the large roof is converted into an ice skating rink.

- Milk Plant

The farm and milk plant were donated by Snow Brand Milk Products. The plant produces Sun Green, a special non-homogenized milk.

- Akapoppo-go Park Bus

The route runs from the Mini Steam Locomotive station to the Pool/Skating Rink, Seseragi Square (Lake Shiratori), and Farm Entrance, before returning to the Mini Steam Locomotive station. The bus consists of three trailer-type cars designed like locomotives, with a capacity of 56 passengers. A full circuit takes about 25 minutes.

- Mini Steam Locomotive “Taiyo”

This steam locomotive–style ride (capacity 30 passengers) departs from the Mini Steam Locomotive station near Central Square. Traveling at approximately 6 km/h, it takes about five minutes to complete the route, passing by the “Funsui Pond” near the Heisei Memorial Hall before returning to the station. The ride is powered primarily by electricity generated through a solar power system installed near the station, with supplementary power drawn from the regular grid. Surplus electricity generated during suspension of operation is used in other park facilities.
