= Fujigaoka Station (Kanagawa) =

Railway station in Yokohama, Japan

Fujigaoka Station 藤が丘駅

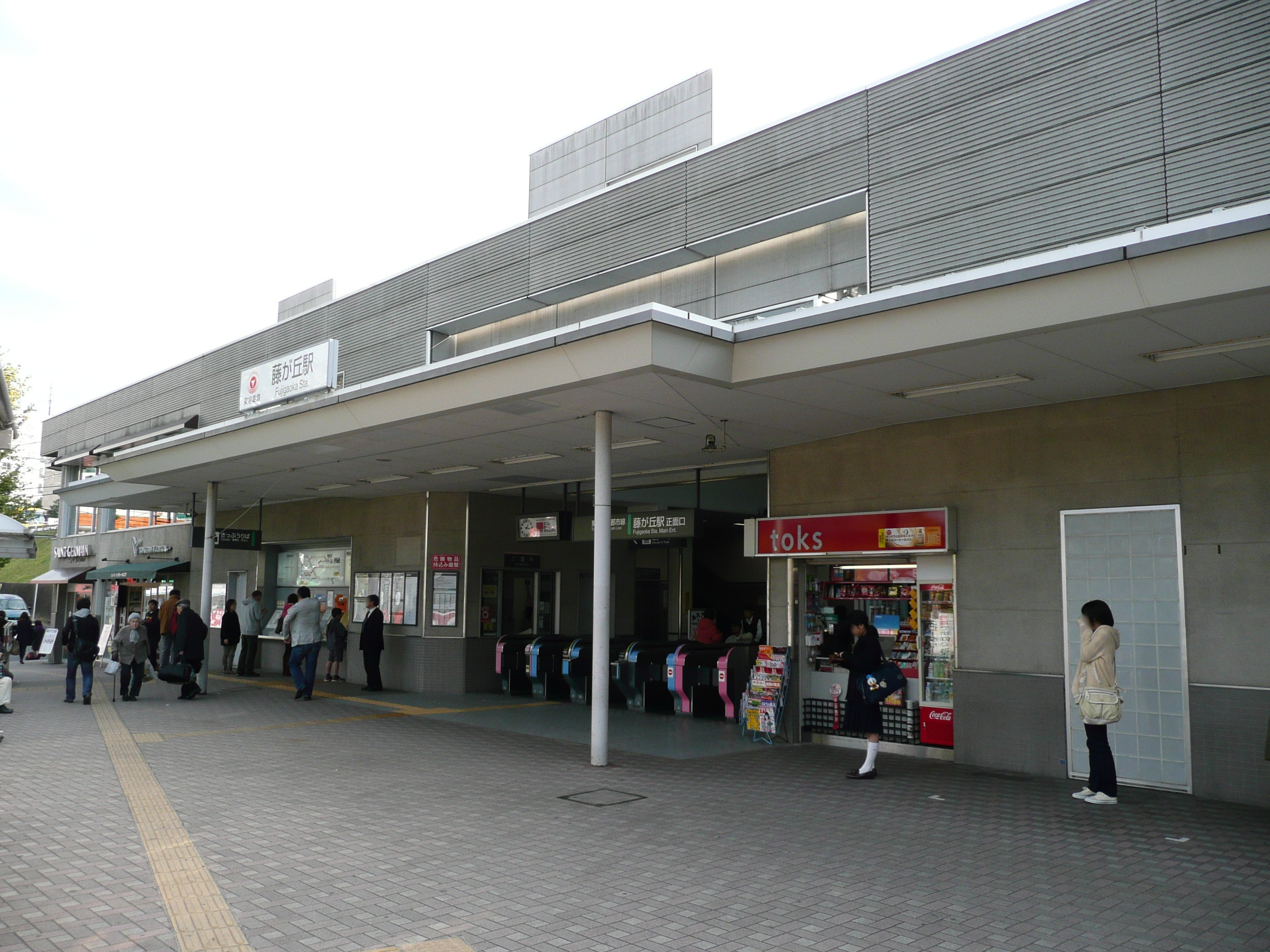
- Fujigaoka Station

General information
- Location: 2-5-4 Fujigaoka, Aoba Ward, Yokohama City; Kanagawa Prefecture 227-0043; Japan
- Coordinates: 35°32′36.94″N 139°31′40.35″E
- Operator: Tōkyū Railways
- Line: Den-en-toshi Line
- Distance: 22.1 km (13.7 mi) from Shibuya
- Platforms: 2 side platforms
- Tracks: 2
- Connections: Bus terminal

Construction
- Structure type: Elevated

Other information
- Station code: DT19
- Website: Official website

History
- Opened: 1 April 1966; 60 years ago

Passengers
- FY2019: 26,769

Services
Preceding station	Tōkyū Railways	Following station
Aobadai towards Chūō-rinkan	Den-en-toshi Line Local	Ichigao towards Shibuya
Location
- Location within Yokohama Location within Kanagawa Prefecture Location within Tokyo Bay and Bōsō Peninsula Location within Japan

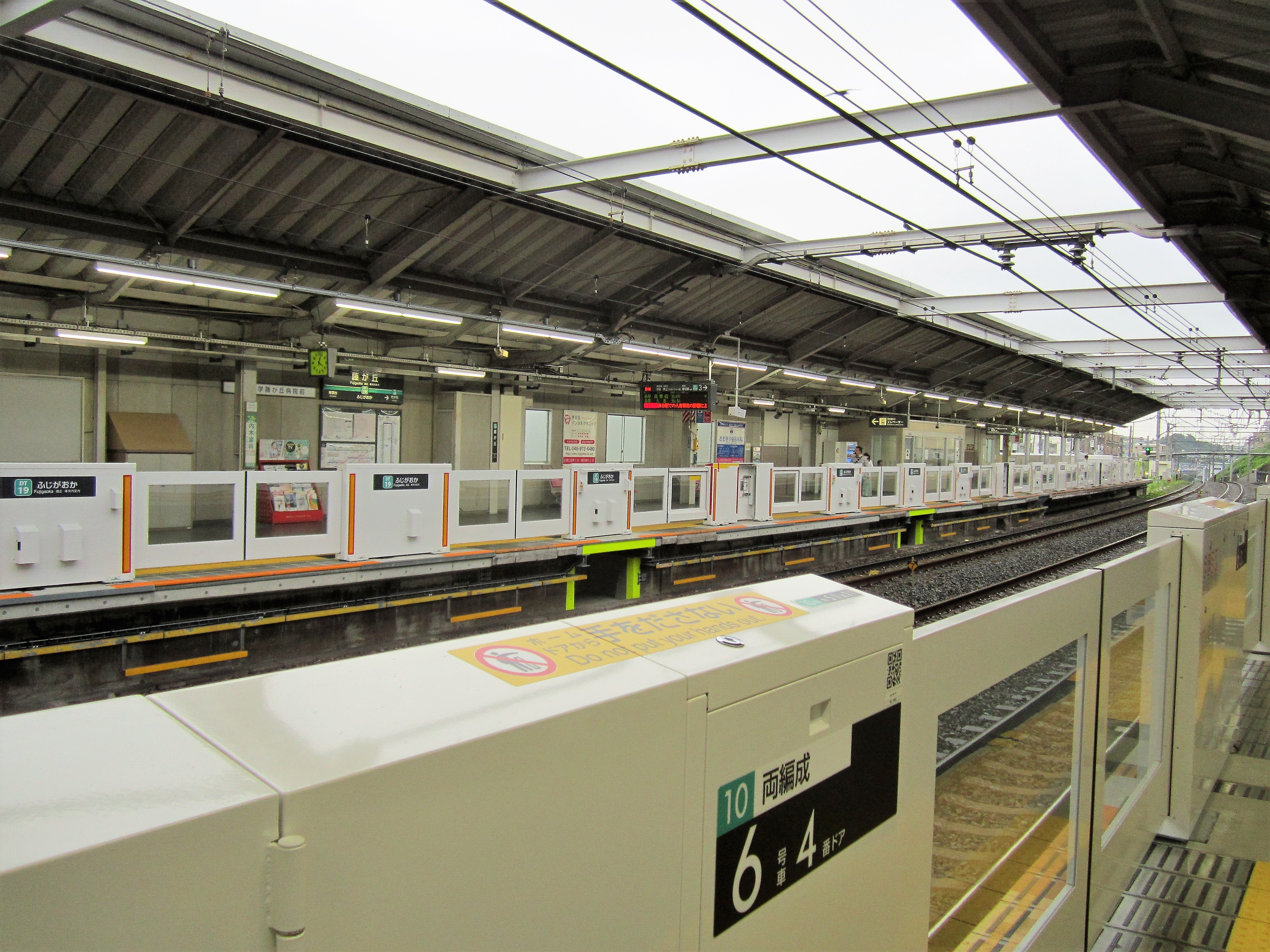
Platforms

Fujigaoka Station (藤が丘駅, Fujigaoka-eki) is a passenger railway station located in Aoba-ku, Yokohama, Kanagawa Prefecture, Japan, operated by the private railway company Tokyu Corporation.

== Lines ==
Fujigaoka Station is served by the Tōkyū Den-en-toshi Line from Shibuya in Tokyo to Chūō-rinkan in Kanagawa Prefecture. It is 22.1 kilometers from the terminus of the line at Shibuya.

== Station layout ==
The station consists of two opposed elevated side platforms serving two tracks, with the station building located underneath.

=== Platforms ===
1	■ Tōkyū Den-en-toshi Line	Nagatsuta・Chūō-rinkan
2	■ Tōkyū Den-en-toshi Line	Futako-tamagawa・Shibuya・Oshiage (Tokyo Metro Hanzōmon Line)・Kasukabe (Tōbu Isesaki Line)

== History ==
Fujigaoka Station was opened on April 1, 1966. The station building was rebuilt in 1999.

== Passenger statistics ==
In fiscal 2019, the station was used by an average of 26,769 passengers daily.

The passenger figures for previous years are as shown below.

Fiscal year	daily average
2005	25,901
2010	26,134
2015	27,244

== Surrounding area ==
- Fujigaoka Shopping Center
- Fujigaoka Park
- Moegino Park
- Fujigaoka District Center
- Yokohama City Moegino Elementary School
- Yokohama City Moegino Junior High School

== See also ==
- List of railway stations in Japan
