= Naruse Station =

Railway station in Machida, Tokyo, Japan

JH22 Naruse Station 成瀬駅
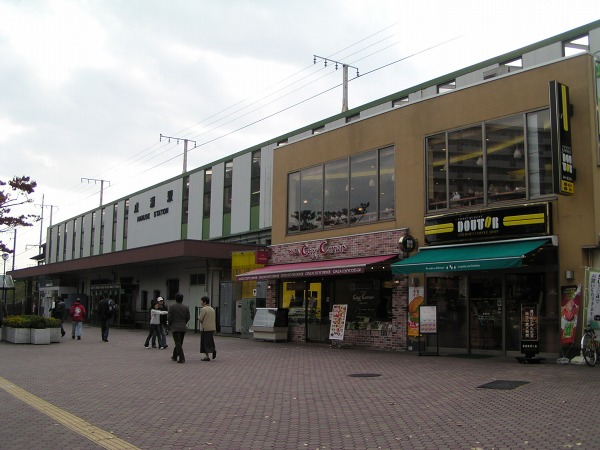
- Naruse Station, November 2005

General information
- Location: 1-1-5 Naruse, Machida-shi, Tokyo 194–0045; Japan
- Coordinates: 35°32′7.8″N 139°28′22.5″E
- Operator: JR East
- Line: Yokohama Line
- Distance: 20.2 km from Higashi-Kanagawa
- Platforms: 1 island platform
- Tracks: 2

Other information
- Status: Staffed (Midori no Madoguchi )
- Website: Official website

History
- Opened: 1 April 1979

Passengers
- FY2019: 19,096 daily

Services
Preceding station	JR East	Following station
Machida JH23 towards Hachiōji	Yokohama Line Local	Nagatsuta JH21 towards Higashi-Kanagawa or Ōfuna
Location
- Location within Tokyo Location within Japan

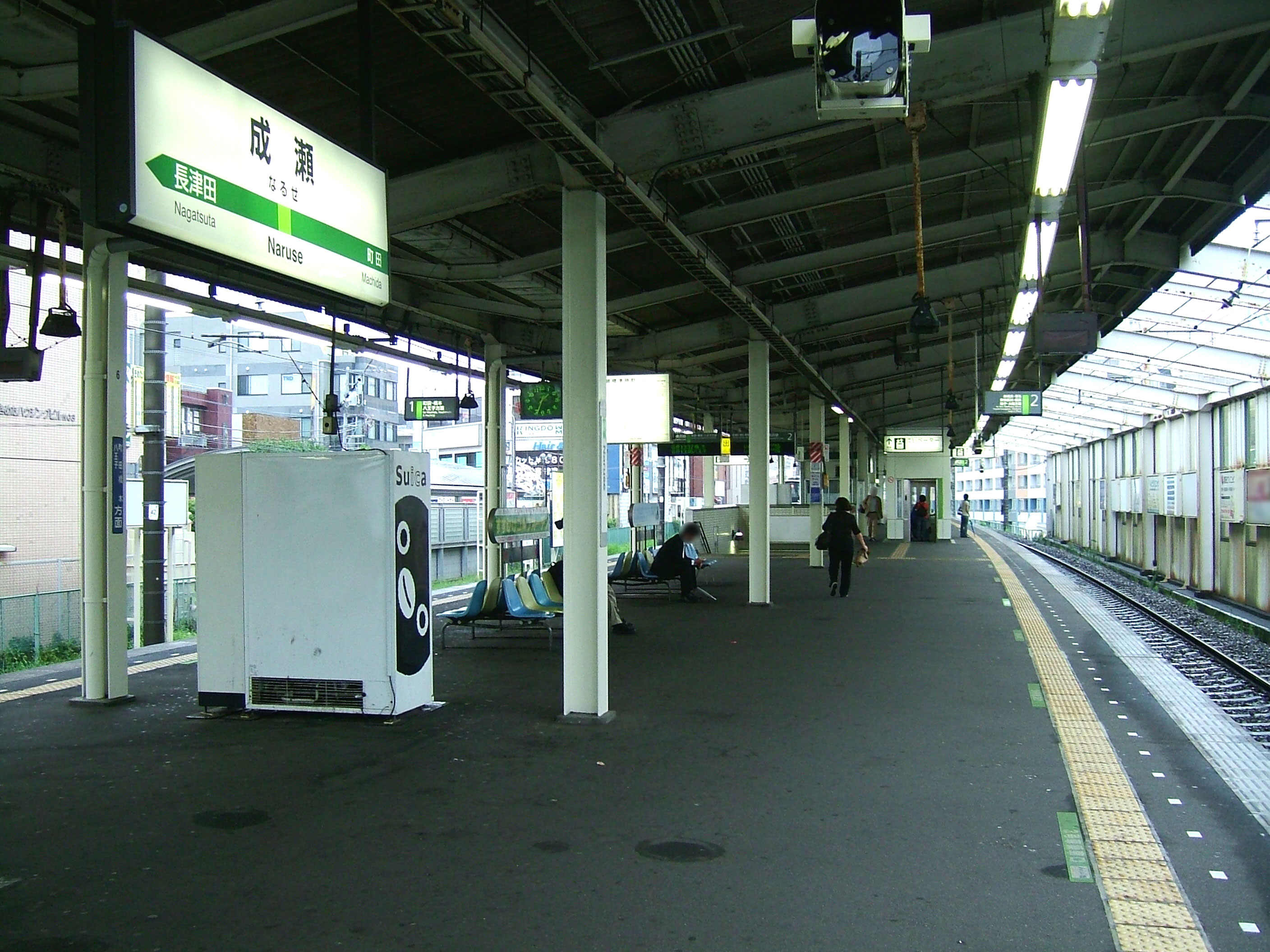
Platform

Naruse Station (成瀬駅, Naruse-eki) is a passenger railway station on the Yokohama Line located in the city of Machida, Tokyo, Japan, operated by the East Japan Railway Company (JR East).

== Lines ==
Naruse Station is served by the Yokohama Line from Hachiōji to Higashi-Kanagawa, and is located 20.2 km from the northern terminus of the line at Higashi-Kanagawa.

== Station layout ==
The station consists of a single elevated island platform serving two tracks, with the station building located underneath. The station has a Midori no Madoguchi staffed ticket office.

=== Platforms ===
1	Yokohama Line	for Machida, Hashimoto, and Hachiōji
2	Yokohama Line	for Higashi-Kanagawa, Yokohama, Sakuragichō and Ōfuna

== History ==
The station opened on 1 April 1979. It became part of the East Japan Railway Company (JR East) with the breakup of the Japanese National Railways on 1 April 1987.

Station numbering was introduced on 20 August 2016 with Naruse being assigned station number JH22.

== Passenger statistics ==
In fiscal 2019, the station was used by an average of 19,096 passengers daily (boarding passengers only).

== Surrounding area ==
- Showa Pharmaceutical University

== See also ==
- List of railway stations in Japan
