= Kodomonokuni Line =

Railway line in Yokohama, Japan

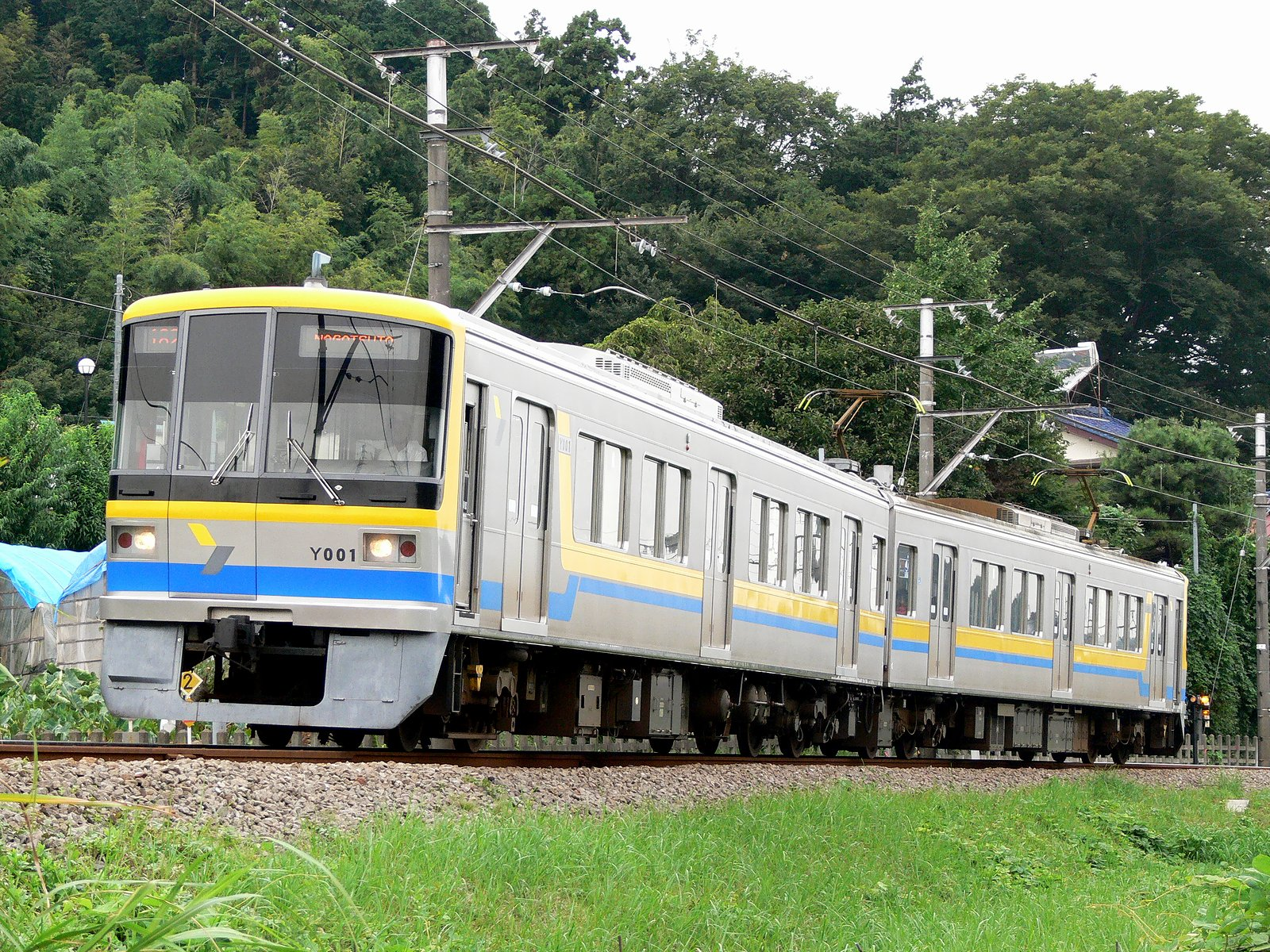
- Yokohama Minatomirai Railway Y000 series EMU near Onda

Overview
- Native name: こどもの国線
- Status: In service
- Owner: Yokohama Minatomirai Railway Company
- Locale: Kanagawa Prefecture
- Termini: Nagatsuta; Kodomonokuni
- Stations: 3
- Color on map: Blue (#0068B7)

Service
- Type: Heavy rail
- System: Tokyu Railways
- Route number: KD
- Operator(s): Tokyu Corporation

History
- Opened: 28 April 1967; 59 years ago

Technical
- Line length: 3.4 km (2 mi)
- Number of tracks: Single line
- Track gauge: 1,067 mm (3 ft 6 in)
- Electrification: 1,500 V DC overhead catenary
- Operating speed: 65 km/h (40 mph)

The Kodomonokuni Line (こどもの国線, Kodomonokuni-sen) is a railway line in Kanagawa Prefecture owned by the Yokohama Minatomirai Railway Company and operated by Tokyu Corporation.

== History ==
The line opened in April 1967, at the same time as its 'parent' station, Nagatsuta. It is a single track local line designed principally to cater for visitors to Kodomonokuni Theme Park (Children's Land) park. Consequently, the two-car trains are particularly busy during summer weekends and holidays.

The line originally was built and opened as a transportation link to the park (which opened in 1965) from the Tōkyū Den-en-toshi Line. The Children's Land Association (Shakai Fukushi Houjin Kodomonokuni Kyokai) owned the right-of-way and the Kodomonokuni Station, but the actual operation was contracted out to Tokyu Corporation.

In 1997, the line was sold to Yokohama Minatomirai Railway Company (MMR), a joint venture of Tokyu Corporation, the Kanagawa prefectural government and the Yokohama city government. In 2000, an intermediate station, Onda, opened in Aoba-ku, Yokohama to reflect the changing role of this line as a commuter line. MMR today owns the right-of-way, Kodomonokuni and Onda stations and the rolling stock, but the actual operation continues to be contracted to Tōkyū.

Local residents along the train line have expressed an interest in getting the Kodomonokuni Line extended northward to meet the Odakyū Odawara Line at Tsurukawa; however the planning has not yet taken off because the proposed rail alignment, despite its short distance, involves two prefectures (Kanagawa, Tokyo) and three cities (Aoba-ku, Yokohama; Asao-ku, Kawasaki and Machida, Tokyo).

The travel time from Nagatsuta to Kodomonokuni is 7 minutes (with one stop at Onda). At both Kodomonokuni and Nagatsuta stations there are ticket machines for this line, but the Kodomonokuni Line shares Tōkyū platforms at Nagatsuta.

Trains depart every 20 minutes throughout the day (every 10 minutes between 8 and 9 a.m. both directions) and at weekends; however, services are more regular during morning and evening peak times, and during Golden Week.

== Station list ==
All stations are located in Yokohama, Kanagawa Prefecture.

No.	Station	Japanese	Distance (km)		Transfers	Location
No.	Station	Japanese	Between stations	Total	Transfers	Location
KD-01	Nagatsuta	長津田	-	0.0	Den-en-toshi Line (DT22); Yokohama Line (JH21)	Midori-ku
KD-02	Onda	恩田	1.8	1.8		Aoba-ku
KD-03	Kodomonokuni	こどもの国	1.6	3.4		Aoba-ku

== Rolling stock ==
- Y000 series (since 1999)

All trains are based at Nagasuta Depot, accessed via a spur located before Onda Station.

=== Former rolling stock ===
- Tokyu 3000 series (original) (from 1967 until 1975)
- Tokyu 3600 series (from 1975 until 1980)
- Tokyu 7200 series (sometimes substituted by Tokyu 5000 (original), 6000 (original) and 8000 series, from 1980 until 1993)
- Tokyu 7000 series (original) (from 1993 until 2000)

=== Future rolling stock ===
- Tokyu 8500 series (from Q4 2025). This train is set to be an excursion train, preserved from set 8637 shortened to 4 cars. As well as the Kodomonokuni Line, it is set to run on the Tokyu Oimachi and Den-en-toshi lines.
