= Tana Station =

Railway station in Yokohama, Japan

Tana Station 田奈駅

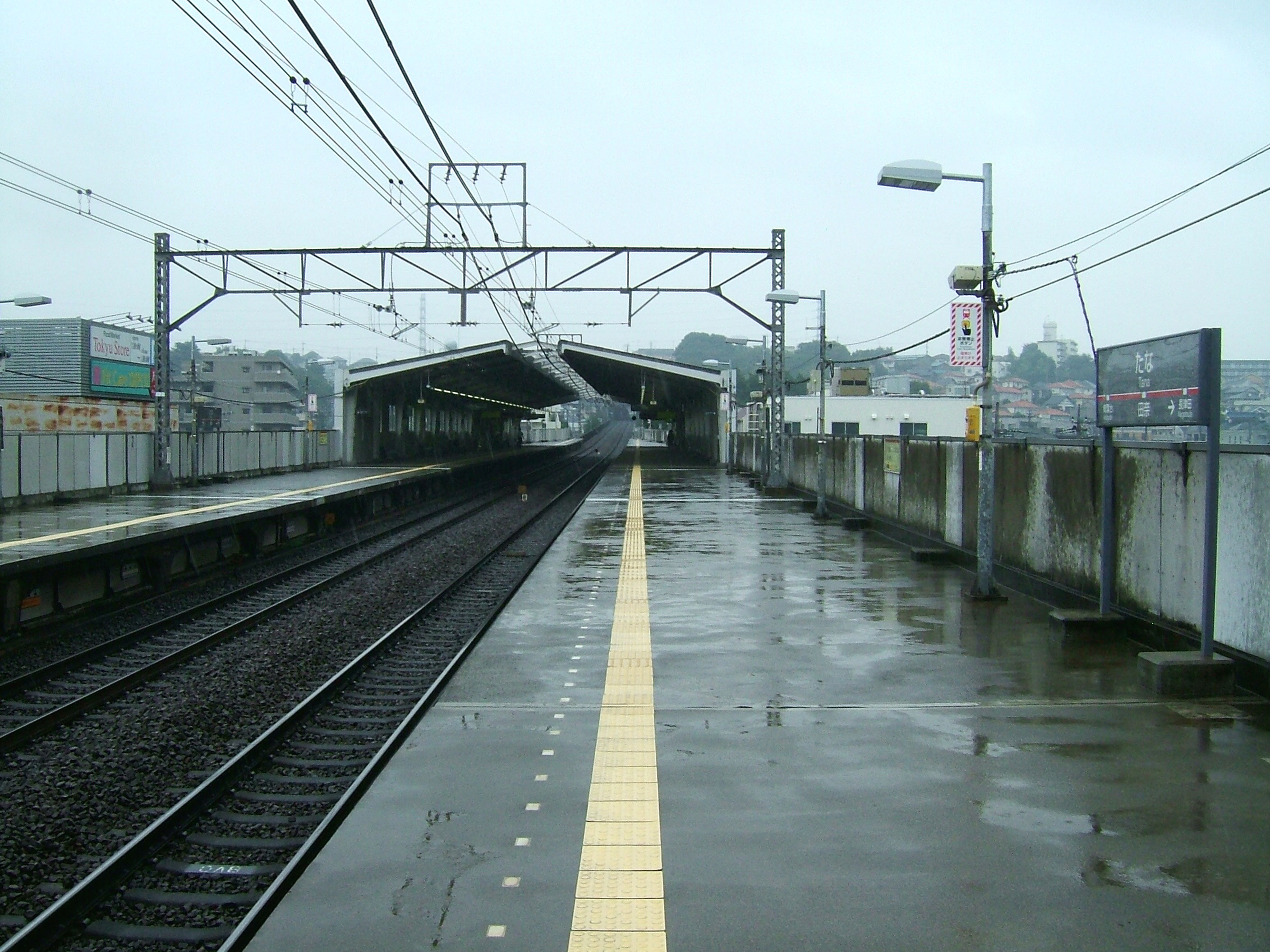
- Tana Station platforms

General information
- Location: 76 Tana-chō, Aoba Ward, Yokohama City; Kanagawa Prefecture 227-0064; Japan
- Coordinates: 35°32′10.24″N 139°30′17.60″E
- Operator: Tōkyū Railways
- Line: Den-en-toshi Line
- Distance: 24.5 km (15.2 mi) from Shibuya
- Platforms: 2 side platforms
- Tracks: 2
- Connections: Bus terminal

Construction
- Structure type: Elevated

Other information
- Station code: DT21
- Website: Official website

History
- Opened: 1 April 1966; 60 years ago

Passengers
- FY2019: 11,038

Services
Preceding station	Tōkyū Railways	Following station
Nagatsuta towards Chūō-rinkan	Den-en-toshi Line Local	Aobadai towards Shibuya
Location
- Location within Yokohama Location within Kanagawa Prefecture Location within Tokyo Bay and Bōsō Peninsula Location within Japan

Tana Station (田奈駅, Tana-eki) is a passenger railway station located in Aoba-ku, Yokohama, Kanagawa Prefecture, Japan, operated by the private railway company Tokyu Corporation.

== Lines ==
Tana Station is served by the Tōkyū Den-en-toshi Line from Shibuya in Tokyo to Chūō-rinkan in Kanagawa Prefecture. It is 24.5 kilometers from the terminus of the line at Shibuya.

== Station layout ==
The station consists of two opposed elevated side platforms serving two tracks, with the station building underneath.

=== Platforms ===
1	■ Tōkyū Den-en-toshi Line	Nagatsuta・Chūō-rinkan
2	■ Tōkyū Den-en-toshi Line	for Futako-tamagawa and Shibuya; Tokyo Metro Hanzomon Line for Oshiage; Tobu Skytree Line for Tōbu-Dōbutsu-Kōen, Kuki and Minami-kurihashi

== History ==
Tana Station was opened on April 1, 1966.

== Lines ==
- Tokyu Corporation
  - Den-en-toshi Line

== Station layout ==
Tana Station has two opposed elevated side platforms serving two tracks. The platforms are connected to the station building by underpasses.

== Passenger statistics ==
In fiscal 2019, the station was used by an average of 11,038 passengers daily.

The passenger figures for previous years are as shown below.

Fiscal year	daily average
2005	10,533
2010	10,951
2015	11,310

== Surrounding area ==
- Tana Elementary School
- Manpuku-ji

== See also ==
- List of railway stations in Japan
