= Kirigaoka =

Coordinates: 35.516105°N 139.502463°E

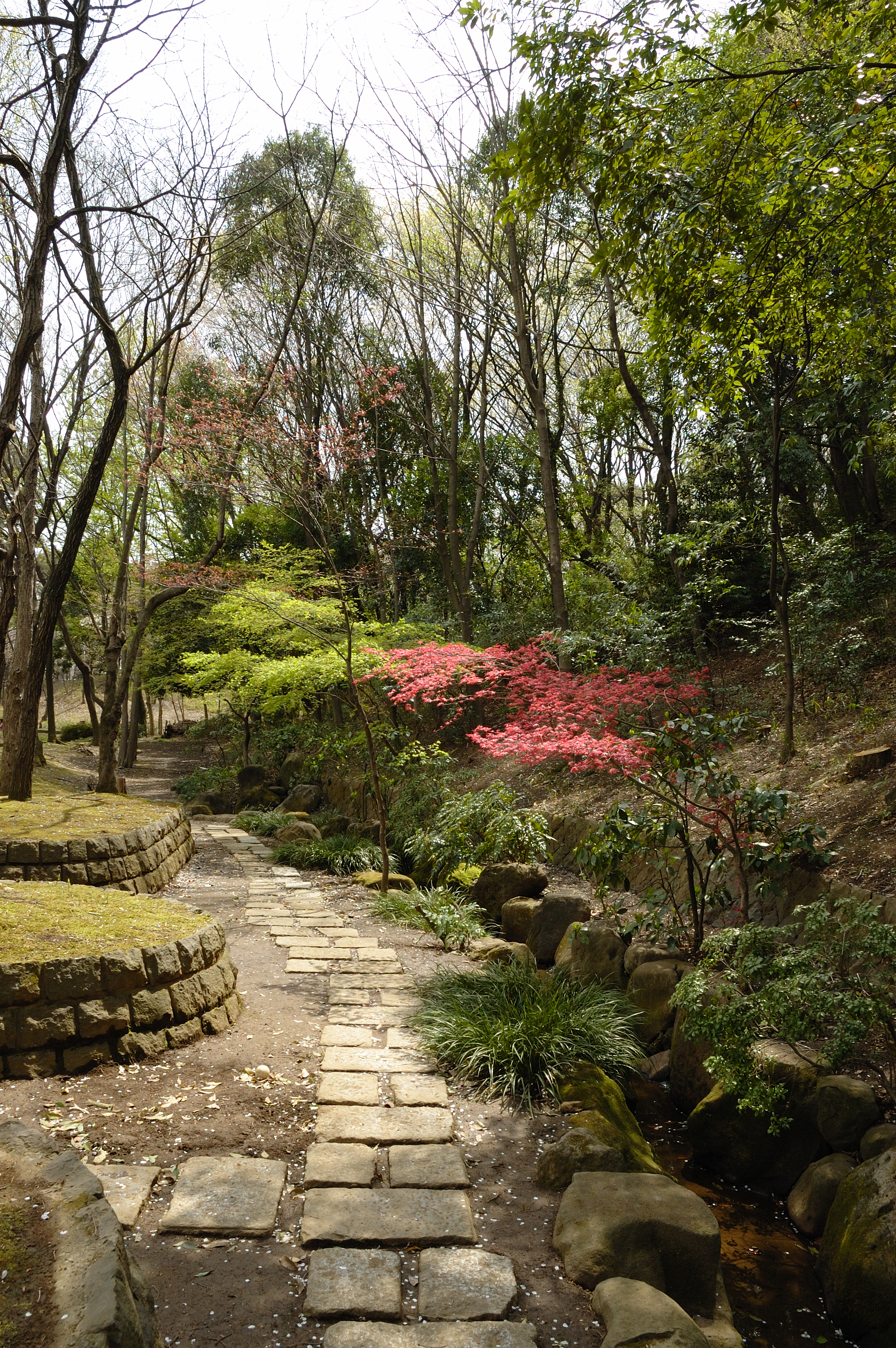
Kirigaoka kōen

Kirigaoka (霧が丘, Kiri-ga-oka) is a small suburb of Yokohama city located in the Midori-ku ward (緑区). It translates directly into a "Misty Hill". Kirigaoka is bound from the North-West by Tōmei Expressway, from the North by Tōkaichiba (十日市場) neighbourhood, from the East by a Niharu-shimin-no-mori (新治市民の森, Niiharushiminnomori) forest and in the South by another suburb called Wakabadai (若葉台).

Kirigaoka also has 9 parks with the main park being called Kirigaoka-kōen (霧が丘公園).

One of the major areas with apartment complexes surrounded by a lot of greenery is called Kirigaoka Green Town (霧が丘グリンタウン). Part of the apartments are private and another part is for rent.

A koban, having a police officer on duty is located at the 3-chome 3-banchi 2-ban address. Nearby is a post office and a bus stop called Yūbinkyoku-mae (郵便局前). Kirigaoka is also home to a famous movie director Akira Kurosawa's - Kurosawa Film Studio.

== Education ==
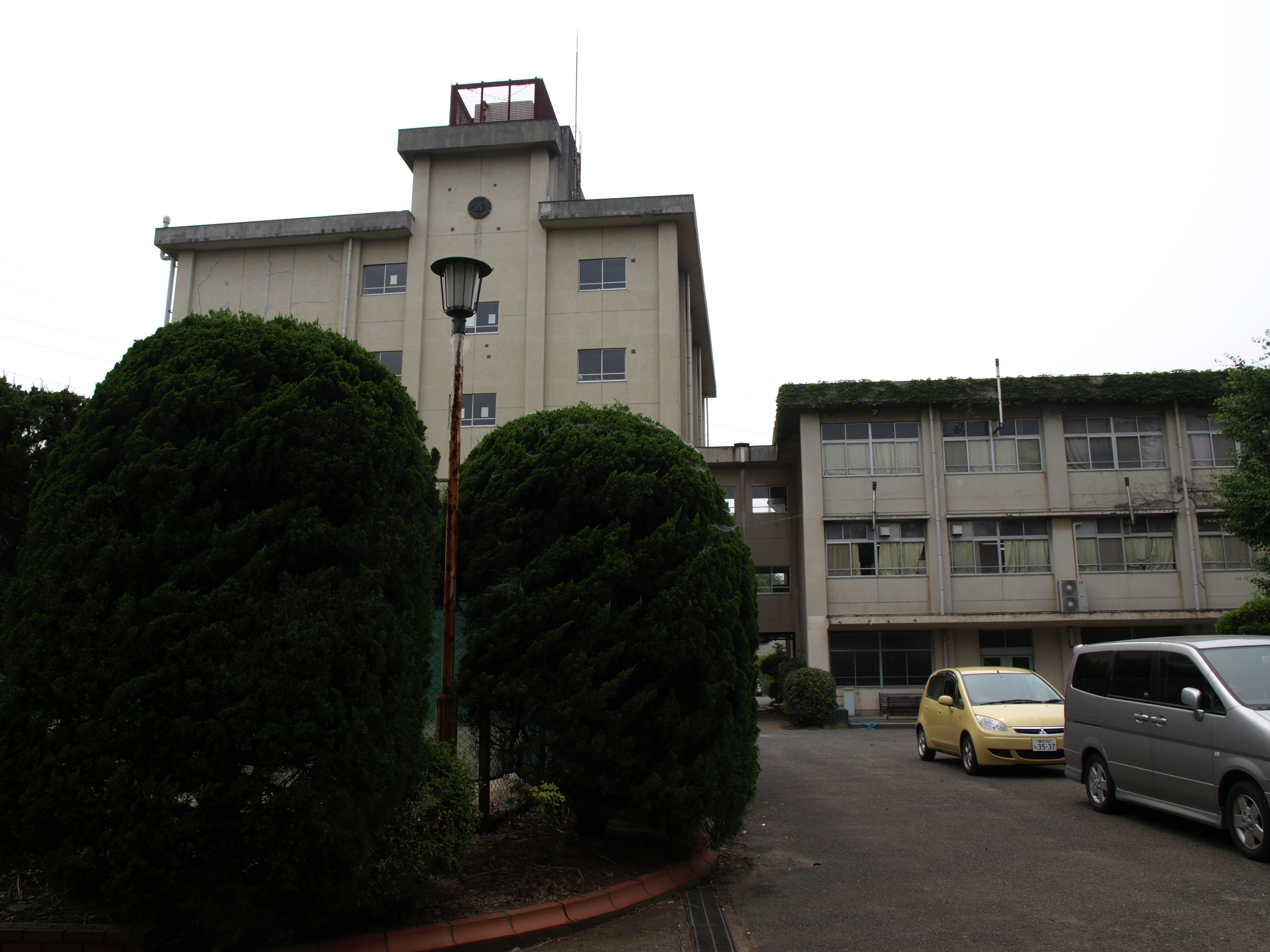
Kirigaoka High School

Yokohama Municipal Board of Education operates public elementary and junior high schools. Kirigaoka (1-6-chome) is zoned to Kirigaoka Compulsory Education School (霧が丘義務教育学校) a.k.a. Kirigaoka Gakuen (霧が丘学園) which includes both elementary and junior high school. It was formed on April 1, 2010 (Heisei 22) as a merger of an existing junior high school and elementary school. Previously Kirigaoka had three elementary schools and a middle school.

There is also a senior high school, Kirigaoka High School, operated by the Kanagawa Prefectural Board of Education.

India International School in Japan (IISJ-Yokohama) an Indian CBSE School operates from 3 Chome Care plaza building.
