= Yokohama University of Art and Design =

Coordinates: 35°33′26″N 139°29′49″E

- 横浜美術大学; Yokohama bijutsu daigaku
- Type: Private
- Established: 2009
- Location: Aoba-ku, Yokohama, Kanagawa, Japan
- Website: Official website

Yokohama University of Art and Design (横浜美術大学, Yokohama bijutsu daigaku) is a private university in Aoba-ku, Yokohama, Kanagawa Prefecture, Japan. In 2009, the university was reorganized from a two-year college to a four-year university. Originally established in 1966 as a women's junior college.
