= Tōkaichiba Station (Kanagawa) =

Railway station in Yokohama, Japan

JH20 Tōka'ichiba Station 十日市場駅
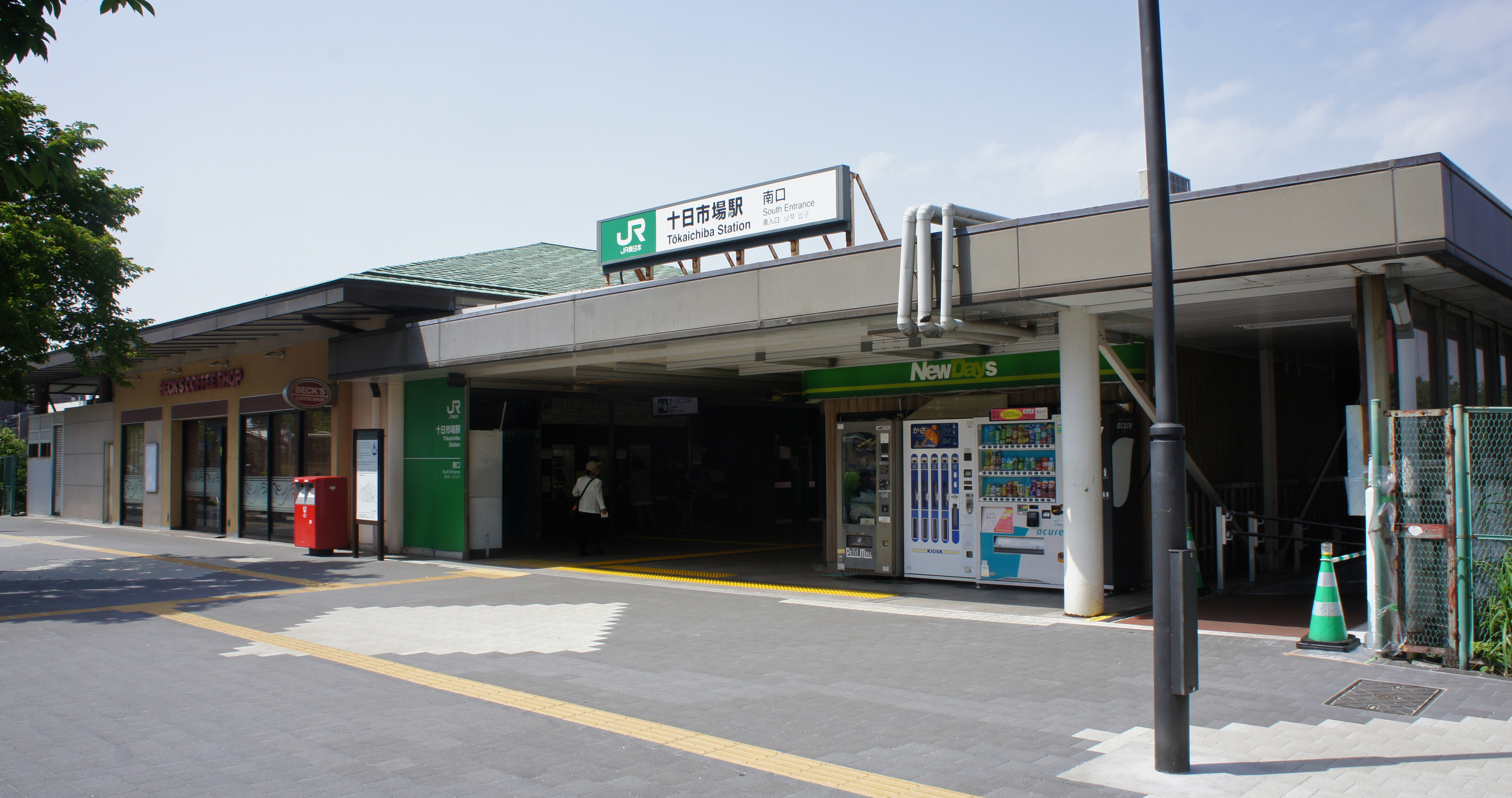
- Tōka'ichiba Station South Exit, May 2021

General information
- Location: Tōka'ichiba-Nakasato, Midori-ku, Yokohama-shi, Kanagawa-ken 226-0025; Japan
- Coordinates: 35°31′34.5″N 139°31′0″E
- Operator: JR East
- Line: Yokohama Line
- Distance: 15.9 km from Higashi-Kanagawa
- Platforms: 1 island platform

Other information
- Status: Staffed
- Station code: JH20
- Website: Official website

History
- Opened: 1 March 1979

Passengers
- FY2019: 20,598 daily

Services
Preceding station	JR East	Following station
Nagatsuta JH21 towards Hachiōji	Yokohama Line Local	Nakayama JH19 towards Higashi-Kanagawa or Ōfuna
Location
- Location within Kanagawa Prefecture Location within Japan

Tōka'ichiba Station (十日市場駅, Tōka'ichiba-eki) is a passenger railway station located in Midori-ku, Yokohama, Kanagawa Prefecture, Japan, operated by the East Japan Railway Company (JR East).

== Lines ==
Tōka'ichiba Station is served by the Yokohama Line from Higashi-Kanagawa to Hachiōji, and is 15.9 km (9.9 mi) from the official starting point of the line at Higashi-Kanagawa. Many services continue west of Higashi-Kanagawa via the Negishi Line to Sakuragicho during the offpeak, and to Ōfuna during the morning peak. Rapid services do not stop at this station.

== Station layout ==
The station consists of a single island platform serving two elevated tracks with the station building underneath. The station is staffed.

=== Platforms ===
1	Yokohama Line	for Machida, Hashimoto and Hachioji
2	Yokohama Line	for Higashi-Kanagawa, Yokohama, Sakuragicho, and Ōfuna

== History ==
Tōka'ichiba Station was opened on 1 March 1979 as a station on the Japanese National Railways (JNR). With the privatization of the JNR on 1 April 1987, the station came under the operational control of JR East.

Station numbering was introduced on 20 August 2016 with Tōka'ichiba being assigned station number JH20.

== Passenger statistics ==
In fiscal 2019, the station was used by an average of 20,598 passengers daily (boarding passengers only).

The passenger figures (boarding passengers only) for previous years are as shown below.

Fiscal year	daily average
2005	21,053
2010	20,859
2015	20,948

== Bus transfers ==
- Yokohama City Transit
- Tokyū Bus
- Kanagawa Central Transit

== Surrounding area ==
- Yokohama City Midori Ward Public Library branch
- Daiei supermarket
- Bus Terminal
- Bank of Yokohama
- Mediapolis (used books, movies and video games)
- Super Autobucks
- Sotetsu Rosen
- Doutor Coffee
- MOS Burger
- McDonald's

== See also ==
- List of railway stations in Japan
