= Nagatsuta Station =

Railway station in Yokohama, Japan

JH21 Nagatsuta Station 長津田駅

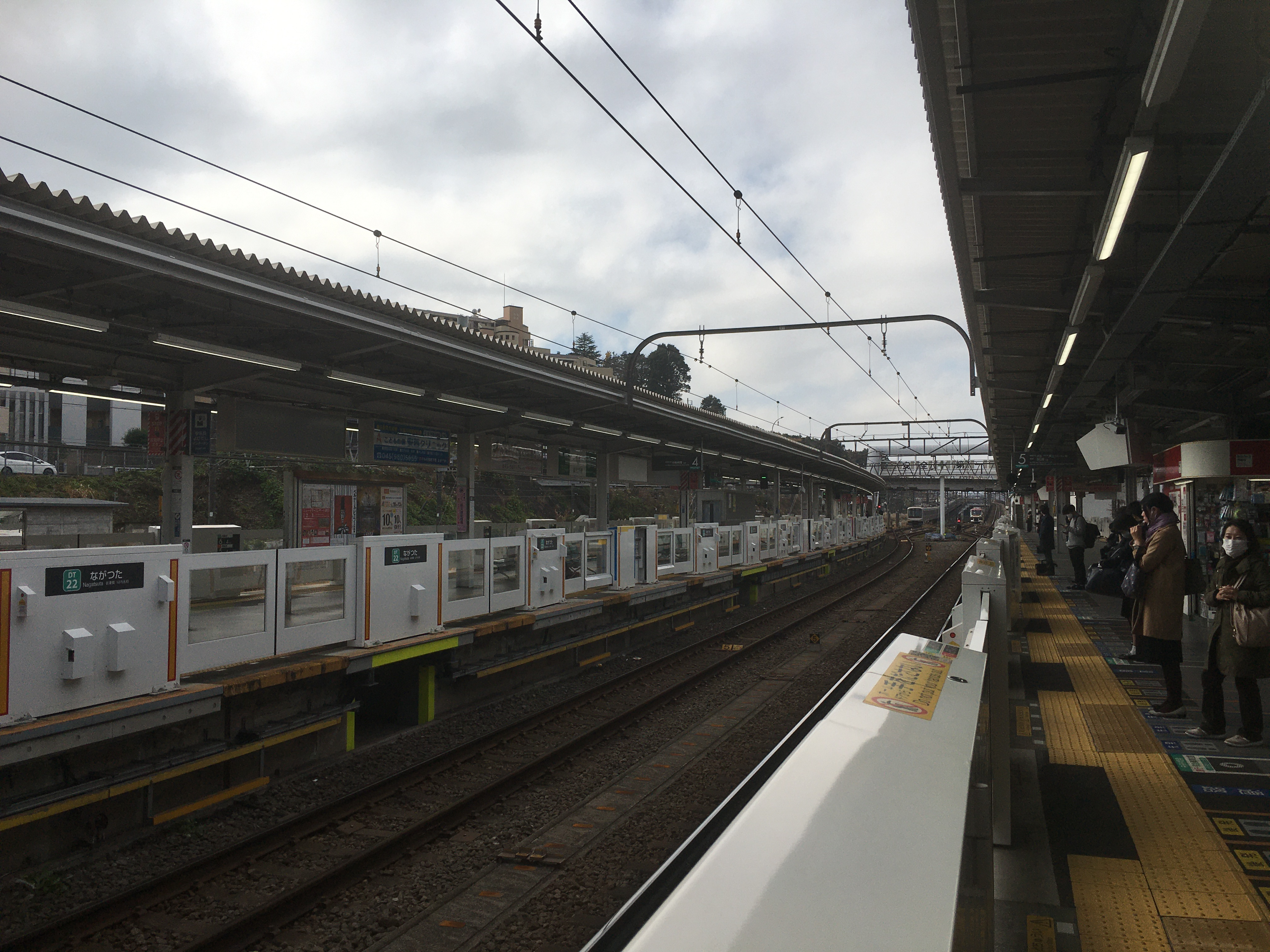
- Platform Tōkyū Den-en-toshi Line

General information
- Location: 4 Nagatsuda, Midori Ward, Yokohama City; Kanagawa Prefecture 226-0027; Japan
- Coordinates: 35.532°N 139.494°E
- Operator: JR East; Tōkyū Railways; Yokohama Minatomirai Railway
- Lines: Yokohama Line; Den-en-toshi Line; Kodomonokuni Line
- Distance: 17.9 km (11.1 mi) from Higashi-Kanagawa
- Platforms: 3 island platform + 1 side platform

Construction
- Structure type: At grade

Other information
- Status: Staffed (Talking reserved seat ticket vending machine(話せる指定席券売機) )
- Station code: JH21, DT22, KD01
- Website: Official website

History
- Opened: 23 September 1908; 117 years ago

Passengers
- FY2019: 61,184 daily (JR East); 70,605 daily (Tokyu)

Services
Preceding station	JR East	Following station
Machida JH23 towards Hachiōji	Yokohama Line Rapid	Nakayama JH19 towards Higashi-Kanagawa or Ōfuna
Naruse JH22 towards Hachiōji	Yokohama Line Local	Tōkaichiba JH20 towards Higashi-Kanagawa or Ōfuna
Preceding station	Tōkyū Railways	Following station
Minami-machida Grandberry Park towards Chūō-rinkan	Den-en-toshi Line Express	Aobadai towards Shibuya
Tsukushino towards Chūō-rinkan	Den-en-toshi Line Semi Express	Aobadai towards Shibuya
Tsukushino towards Chūō-rinkan	Den-en-toshi Line Local	Tana towards Shibuya
Onda towards Kodomonokuni	Kodomonokuni Line	Terminus
Location
- Location within Yokohama Location within Kanagawa Prefecture Location within Tokyo Bay and Bōsō Peninsula Location within Japan

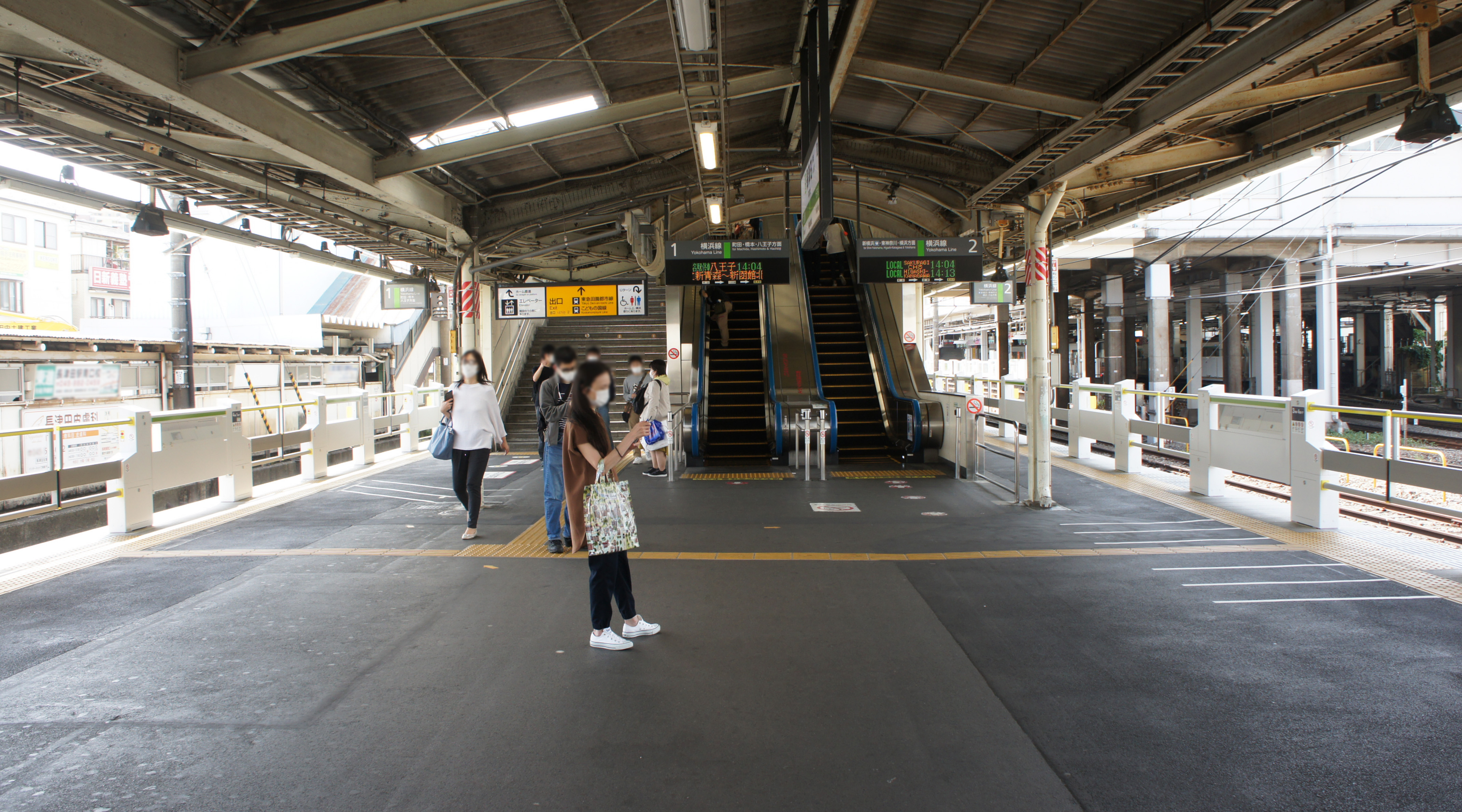
Platform Yokohama Line

Nagatsuta Station (長津田駅, Nagatsuta-eki) is an interchange passenger railway station located in Midori-ku, Yokohama, Kanagawa Prefecture, Japan, jointly operated by East Japan Railway Company (JR East), Tokyu Corporation, and the Yokohama Minatomirai Railway.

== Lines ==
Nagatsuta Station is served by the JR East Yokohama Line, and is located 17.9 kilometers from the terminus of the line at Higashi-Kanagawa. Many services continue west of Higashi-Kanagawa via the Negishi Line to Sakuragicho during the offpeak, and to Ōfuna during the morning peak. It is also served by the Tōkyū Den-en-toshi Line, and is 25.6 kilometers from that line's terminus at Shibuya in Tokyo. In addition, Nagatsuta is the terminus of the Kodomonokuni Line operated by the Yokohama Minatomirai Railway.

== Station layout ==
Nagatsuta Station is where the express and local trains on the Den-en-toshi line cross. JR Nagatsuta and Tōkyū Nagatsuta use the same building. JR Nagatsuta Station has a single island platform serving two elevated tracks. The station has a Talking reserved seat ticket vending machine(話せる指定席券売機). Tōkyū Nagatsuta Station has two island platforms serving four elevated tracks. The Kodomonokuni Line has a single side platform.

=== Platforms ===
1	Yokohama Line	for Machida, Hashimoto, and Hachiōji
2	Yokohama Line	for Higashi-Kanagawa, Yokohama, Sakuragichō and Ōfuna
3, 4	Tōkyū Den-en-toshi Line	for Chūō-rinkan
5, 6	Tōkyū Den-en-toshi Line	for Futako-tamagawa and Shibuya; Tokyo Metro Hanzomon Line for Oshiage; Tobu Skytree Line for Tōbu-Dōbutsu-Kōen, Kuki and Minami-kurihashi
7	Kodomonokuni Line	for Kodomonokuni

== History ==
Nagatsuta Station was opened on 23 September 1908.

Station numbering was introduced to the Yokohama Line on 20 August 2016 with Nagatsuta being assigned station number JH21.

== Passenger statistics ==
In fiscal 2019, the JR station was used by an average of 61,184 passengers daily (boarding passengers only). During the period, the Tokyu station was used by an average of 70,605 passengers daily.

The daily average passenger figures (boarding passengers only) for previous years are as shown below.

Fiscal year	JR East	Tokyu
2005	53,958	63,658
2010	56,769	66,616
2015	60,272	70,491

== Surrounding area ==
- Yokohama City Midori Ward Cultural Center (Midori Art Park)
- Nagatsuta District Center
- Minami Nagatsuda housing complex
- Nagatsuta housing complex
- Nagatsuta Kosei General Hospital
- Yokohama City Nagatsuta Elementary School

== See also ==
- List of railway stations in Japan
