= Aobadai Station =

Railway station in Yokohama, Japan

Aobadai Station 青葉台駅

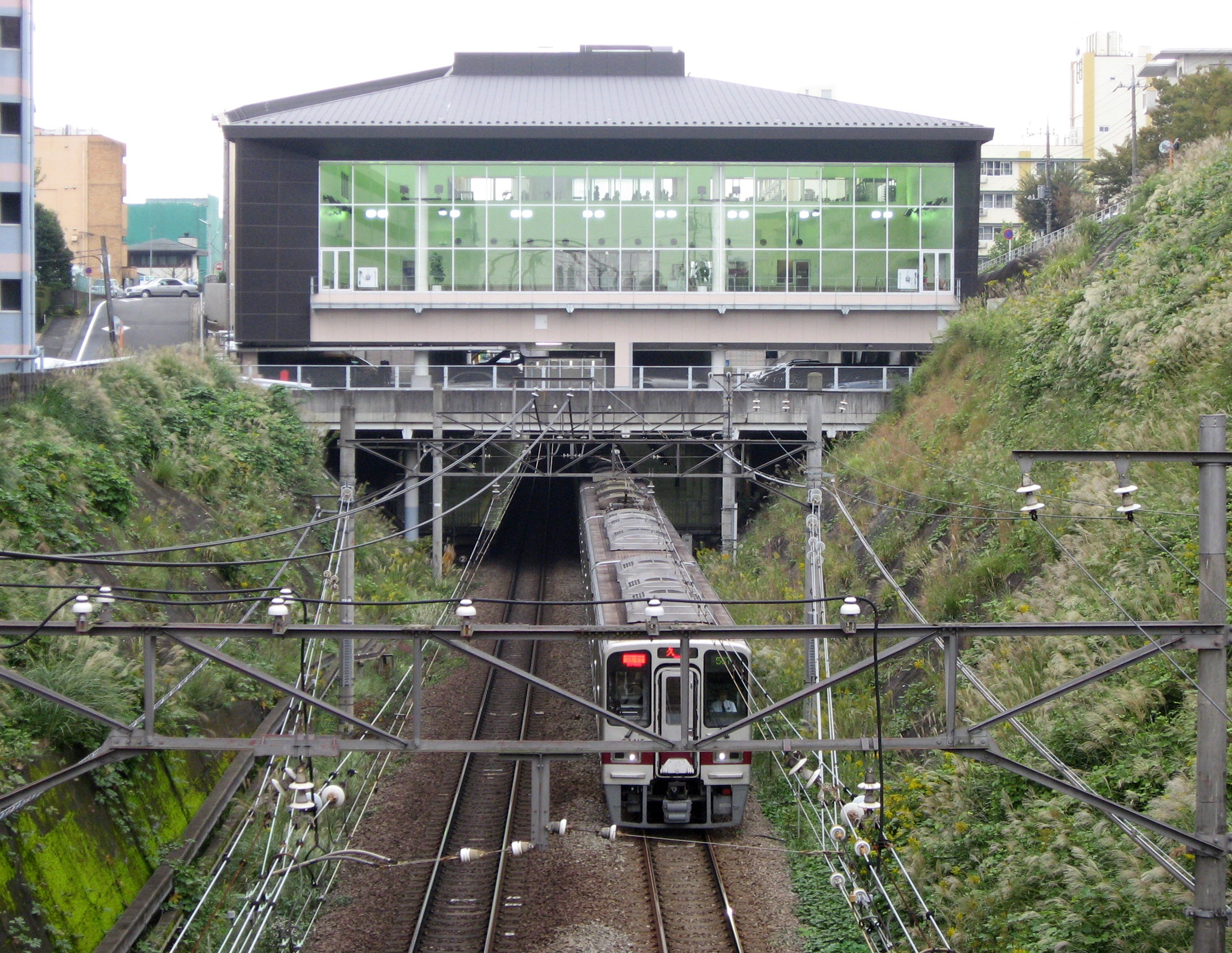
- Aobadai Station

General information
- Location: 1-7-3 Aobadai, Aoba Ward, Yokohama City; Kanagawa Prefecture 227-0062; Japan
- Coordinates: 35°32′34.64″N 139°31′1.86″E
- Operator: Tōkyū Railways
- Line: Den-en-toshi Line
- Distance: 23.1 km (14.4 mi) from Shibuya
- Platforms: 2 side platforms
- Tracks: 2
- Connections: Bus terminal

Construction
- Structure type: At grade

Other information
- Station code: DT20
- Website: Official website

History
- Opened: 1 April 1966; 60 years ago

Passengers
- FY2019: 110,999

Services
Preceding station	Tōkyū Railways	Following station
Nagatsuta towards Chūō-rinkan	Den-en-toshi Line Express Semi-Express	Azamino towards Shibuya
Tana towards Chūō-rinkan	Den-en-toshi Line Local	Fujigaoka towards Shibuya
Location
- Location within Yokohama Location within Kanagawa Prefecture Location within Tokyo Bay and Bōsō Peninsula Location within Japan

Aobadai Station (青葉台駅, Aobadai-eki) is a passenger railway station located in Aoba-ku, Yokohama, Kanagawa Prefecture, Japan, operated by the private railway company Tokyu Corporation.

== Lines ==
Aobadai Station is served by the Tōkyū Den-en-toshi Line from Shibuya in Tokyo to Chūō-rinkan in Kanagawa Prefecture. It is 23.1 kilometers from the terminus of the line at Shibuya.

== Station layout ==
The station consists of two opposed side platforms serving two tracks in a deep cutting with the station building located above them.

=== Platforms ===
1	■ Tōkyū Den-en-toshi Line	Nagatsuta・Chūō-rinkan
2	■ Tōkyū Den-en-toshi Line	for Futako-tamagawa and Shibuya; Tokyo Metro Hanzomon Line for Oshiage; Tobu Skytree Line for Tōbu-Dōbutsu-Kōen, Kuki and Minami-kurihashi

== History ==
Aobadai Station was opened on April 1, 1966. The station building was rebuilt from 1990 to 1992, and a new bus terminal was added.

== Passenger statistics ==
In fiscal 2019, the station was used by an average of 110,999 passengers daily.

The passenger figures for previous years are as shown below.

Fiscal year	daily average
2005	107,258
2010	109,499
2015	112,144

== Surrounding area ==
- Philia Hall (Aoba Ward Cultural Center)
- Aobadai Park
- Sakuradai Park
- Yokohama City Aobadai Junior High School
- Aobadai Tokyu Square

== See also ==
- List of railway stations in Japan
