= Midori-ku, Yokohama =

Midori 緑区
- Ward
- Midori Ward
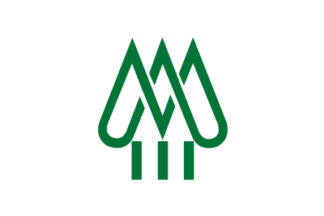
- Flag Emblem

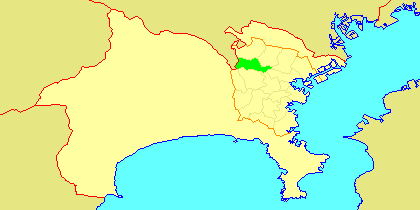
- Location of Midori in Kanagawa
- Interactive map of Midori
- Midori (Japan)
- Coordinates: 35°30′45″N 139°32′17″E
- Country: Japan
- Region: Kantō
- Prefecture: Kanagawa
- City: Yokohama

Area
  - Total: 25.42 km^{2} (9.81 sq mi)

Population (February 2010)
  - Total: 176,038
  - Density: 6,900/km^{2} (18,000/sq mi)
- Time zone: UTC+9 (Japan Standard Time)
- Tree: Maple
- Flower: Bletilla striata
- Address: 118 Terayama-chō, Midori-ku Yokohama-shi, Kanagawa-ken; 226-0013
- Website: Official website of Midori-ku

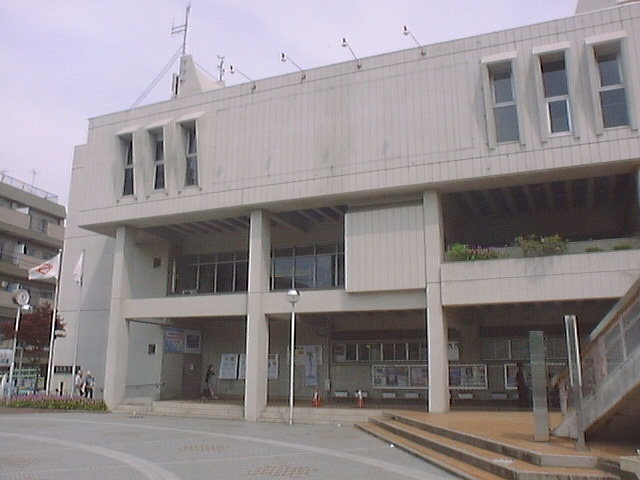
Midori Ward Office

Midori-ku (緑区) is one of the 18 wards of the city of Yokohama in Kanagawa Prefecture, Japan. As of 2010, the ward had an estimated population of 176,038 and a density of 6,900 persons per km^{2}. The total area was 25.42 km^{2}.

== Geography ==
Midori Ward is located in eastern Kanagawa Prefecture, and on the northwest borders of the city of Yokohama. Except for the northeast portion, much of the area is hilly and relatively sparsely populated compared to other parts of the city. The flatter northeast portion is located on the Tsurumi River basin, with the river serving as a ward boundary with Tsuzuki-ku.

=== Surrounding municipalities ===
- Seya Ward
- Kanagawa Ward
- Kohoku Ward
- Aoba Ward
- Hodogaya Ward
- Asahi Ward
- Tsuzuki Ward
- Machida, Tokyo

== History ==
The area around present-day Midori Ward was formerly part of Tsuzuki District in Musashi Province. During the Edo period, it was a rural region classified as tenryō territory controlled directly by the Tokugawa shogunate, but administered through various hatamoto. After the Meiji Restoration, the area became part of the new Kanagawa Prefecture in 1868. In the cadastral reform of April 1, 1889, the area was divided into numerous villages. During the Meiji period, the area was a center for sericulture. On April 1, 1939, Tsuzuki District was annexed by the neighboring city of Yokohama. In a major administrative reorganization of October 1, 1969, Midori emerged as an independent ward within the city of Yokohama. In 1980, a portion of Midori Ward was transferred to Seya Ward. In 1994, Midori-ku was divided into the present-day Midori-ku, and Aoba-ku and Tsuzuki-ku.

== Economy ==
Midori Ward is largely a regional commercial center and bedroom community for central Yokohama and Tokyo. There is some residual agriculture in Midori Ward, primarily rice. Major industries include food processing, electronics and precision manufacturing.

== Transportation ==
=== Railroads ===
- JR East – Yokohama Line
  - Kamoi - Nakayama - Tōkaichiba - Nagatsuta
- Tokyu Corporation – Tōkyū Den-en-toshi Line, Kodomonokuni Line
  - Nagatsuta
- Yokohama City Transportation Bureau - Green Line
  - Nakayama

=== Highways ===
- Tōmei Expressway
- Japan National Route 16
- Japan National Route 246

==== Prefecture roads ====
- Kanagawa Prefectural Route 109
- Kanagawa Prefectural Route 139
- Kanagawa Prefectural Route 140

== Education ==
Several universities are located in the ward, most notably the Nagatsuta campus of the Tokyo Institute of Technology. Other universities include Showa University and Toyo Eiwa University.

Kanagawa Prefectural Board of Education operates prefectural high schools.

- Hakusan High School
- Kirigaoka High School

Yokohama Municipal Board of Education operates public elementary and junior high schools.

There is a combined elementary and junior high school, Kirigaoka Gakuen (霧が丘学園).

Municipal junior high schools:

- Higashi Kamoi (東鴨居)
- Kamoi (鴨居)
- Nakayama (中山)
- Tana (田奈)
- Tokaichiba (十日市場)

Municipal elementary schools:

- Higashi Hongo (東本郷)
- Ibukino (いぶき野)
- Kamiyama (上山)
- Kamoi (鴨居)
- Midori (緑)
- Miho (三保)
- Morinodai (森の台)
- Nagatsuta (長津田)
- Nagatsuta Daini (No. 2) (長津田第二)
- Nakayama (中山)
- Niiharu (新治)
- Takeyama (竹山)
- Tokaichiba (十日市場)
- Yamashita (山下)
- Yamashita Midoridai (山下みどり台)

Tana Elementary School (田奈小学校), outside of Midori-ku, serves a part of Midori-ku.

Private schools

- The Yokohama campus of the India International School in Japan is located in this ward.

== Noted people from Midori Ward ==
- Masahiro Inoue, actor
- Masahiro Matsuoka, idol

== Neighborhoods with Midori Ward ==
Areas with a -cho suffix are located in the less dense parts of the ward.

- Aoto-cho (青砥町)
- Daimura-cho (台村町)
- Hakusan (白山)
- Higashihongo (東本郷)
- Higashihongo-cho (東本郷町)
- Ibukino (いぶき野)
- Kamiyama (上山)
- Kamoi (鴨居)
- Kamoi-cho (鴨居町)
- Kirigaoka (霧が丘)
- Kitahassaku-cho (北八朔町)
- Koyama-cho (小山町)
- Miho-cho (三保町)
- Morinodai (森の台)
- Nagatsuta (長津田)
- Nagatsuta-cho (長津田町)
- Nagatsuta-minamidai (長津田みなみ台)
- Nakayama-cho (中山町)
- Niiharu-cho (新治町)
- Nishihassaku-cho (西八朔町)
- Takeyama (竹山)
- Terayama-cho (竹山町)
- Tokaichiba-cho (十日市場町)
