= Yokohama Minatomirai Railway =

Railway company in Kanagawa Prefecture, Japan

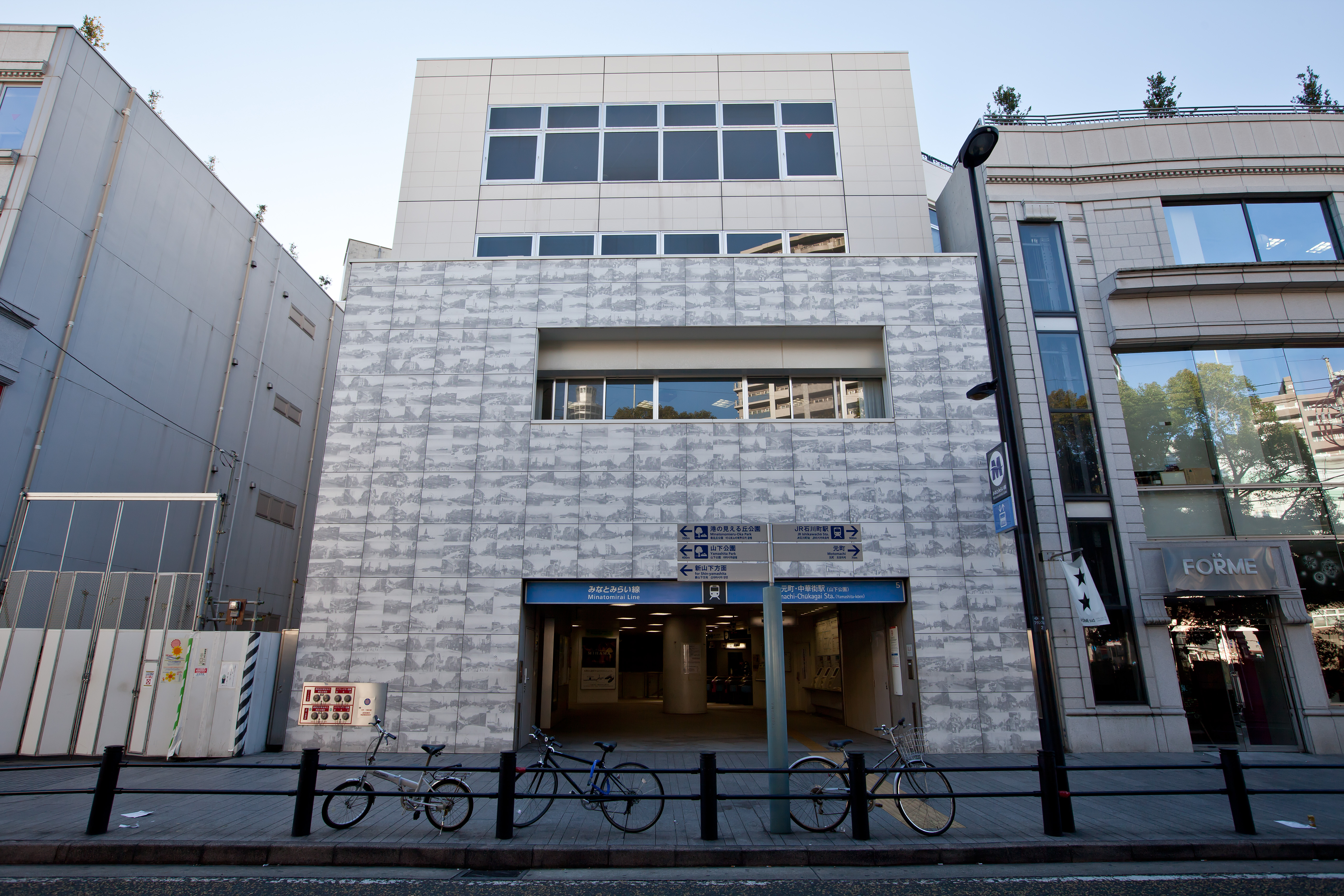
- Yokohama Minatomirai Railway headquarters at Motomachi-Chukagai Station
- Parent: Shareholders: Yokohama City (63.48%); Kanagawa Prefecture (8.87%); Tokyu Corporation (4.44%); Mitsubishi Estate (3.73%); Government of Japan through DBJ (1.97%); Keikyu (1.66%); Urban Renaissance Agency (1.28%); Bank of Yokohama (1.17%); Sotetsu (1.02%); MUFG Bank (1%)
- Founded: 29 March 1989
- Headquarters: Naka-ku, Yokohama
- Locale: Yokohama
- Service type: Rapid Transit
- Website: www.mm21railway.co.jp

The Yokohama Minatomirai Railway (横浜高速鉄道, Yokohama Kōsoku Tetsudō; lit. "Yokohama Rapid Railway") is a third-sector railway company funded by the city of Yokohama, Kanagawa Prefecture, and Tokyu Corporation.

The company oversees the Minatomirai Line and the Kodomonokuni Line. Train crews and operations are contracted out to Tokyu Corporation.

== History ==
The company was founded on 29 March 1989, and on 19 April 1990, received government approval to operate the Minatomirai Line. On 1 August 1997, the company acquired the Kodomonokuni Line. The Minatomirai Line opened on 1 February 2004.
