= Chiba Institute of Technology =

University in Chiba Prefecture, Japan

Coordinates: 35°41′21″N 140°01′15″E

- 千葉工業大学
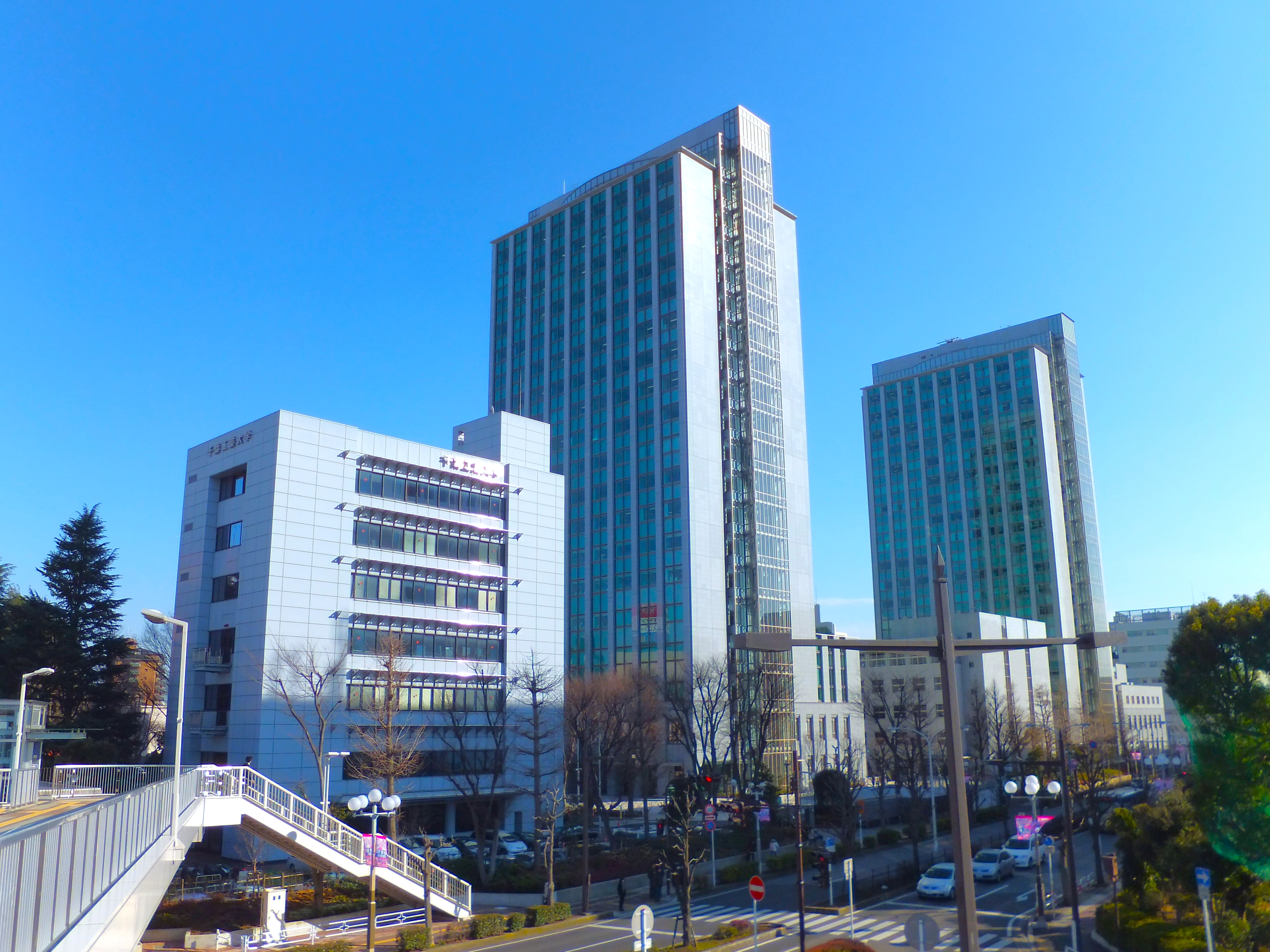
- Motto: 師弟同行 自学自律
- Type: Private
- Established: 1942 (planned in 1929)
- President: Joichi Ito
- Students: 9,935
- Location: Narashino, Chiba, Japan
- Campus: Urban
- Nickname: Chibatech
- Website: www.chibatech.jp/english

Chiba Institute of Technology (Japanese: 千葉工業大学, romanized: Chiba kōgyō daigaku; CIT, CT, or Chibatech (Note: Also abbreviated as Chiba kōdai (千葉工大), Chiba kō (千葉工), kōdai (工大), or sen kōdai (千工大).)) is a private university in Narashino, Chiba, Japan. It is the oldest private technical university in Japan founded in 1942.

The university operates three campuses (Tsudanuma, Shin-Narashino, and Tokyo Skytree Town) and currently enrolls approximately 9,935 students across five undergraduate faculties: one English-taught School of Design & Science, and five graduate schools. Chibatech specialises in engineering, information science, creative engineering, advanced engineering, and management science, with strong emphasis on robotics, planetary exploration, artificial intelligence, and ocean-resource research.

Since July 2023, the 14th president of the university has been Joichi Ito. Under his leadership, the university has expanded international partnerships, launched its first fully English-language undergraduate programme (School of Design & Science) in 2025, and established the Henkaku Center for radical interdisciplinary innovation.

Chibatech maintains active research centres including the Future Robotics Technology Center (fuRo), the Planetary Exploration Research Center (PERC), the Ocean Resources Research Center for Next Generation (ORCeNG), the STAIR Lab for artificial intelligence, and the Henkaku Center. The university consistently ranks among Japan's leading private technical institutions and is known for producing engineers who have contributed to major projects in gaming (Nintendo Entertainment System), animation, robotics, and space exploration.

== Academics ==
Chiba Institute of Technology offers a comprehensive range of undergraduate and graduate programs centered on engineering, technology, and interdisciplinary innovation. The university prioritizes hands-on, project-based learning to equip students with practical skills for real-world applications, aligning with its motto of "teachers and students walking together" through self-directed study and discipline. With approximately 9,935 students, including a significant portion in STEM fields, the institution fosters an environment that integrates cutting-edge research with education. In 2016, the undergraduate structure was reorganized into five faculties encompassing 17 departments to promote specialized yet collaborative training. Further evolutions occurred in 2024, with the Faculty of Information and Computer Science renamed to the Faculty of Innovative Information Science and the Faculty of Social Systems Science to the Faculty of Innovative Management Science, reflecting a forward-looking emphasis on information-driven leadership. In July 2025, the university introduced its inaugural English-language program, the School of Design & Science, to attract global talent and blend design thinking with scientific inquiry.

The undergraduate curriculum spans four years, culminating in a bachelor's degree, with opportunities for internships, international exchanges, and capstone projects. Admission is competitive, with an acceptance rate of around 36% and annual tuition fees ranging from ¥1,200,000 to ¥1,500,000 (excluding additional fees). Credit transfer agreements facilitate seamless mobility with 34 local Chiba institutions, the Open University of Japan, and Chiba University.

== Recent news ==
In July 2023, Joichi Ito was named the 14th President.

In August 2023, Chiba Institute of Technology is listed as participating in the Japan-U.S. Research Collaboration Week.

In September 2023, the President's Message was released and outlined three key points for the future of the university including the need to elevate IT engineers in society, the importance of applying acquired knowledge and technical skills to the real world, and the need to form a deep connection with society through project-based learning.

In October 2023, Mount Sinai's Icahn School of Medicine in New York City announced a partnership with the Chiba Institute of Technology to work together on using artificial intelligence for cardiovascular disease research in order to make it more efficient and results more rapidly.

In October 2024, Chiba Institute of Technology President Joi Ito presented an honorary doctorate degree to Princess Akiko of Mikasa.

In November 2024, Chiba Institute of Technology President Joi Ito awarded an honorary doctorate to Robert S. Langer.

In May 2025, Chiba Institute of Technology President Joi Ito conferred honorary doctorates to His Majesty King Jigme Khesar Namgyel Wangchuck, Laurene Powell Jobs and Reid Hoffman in recognition of their notable contributions to society.

In July 2025, at the 2025 Symposium on Design and Science, President Ito launched the Chiba Institute of Technology (Chibatech) School of Design & Science. This is the university's first English-language program, starting with seven faculty members, Hiro (Sputniko) Ozaki, Catharina Maracke, Joe Austerweil, Mizuki Oka, Ira Winder, Hiroki Kojima and Daum Kim. During the symposium, the Henkaku Center at Chiba Institute of Technology (Chibatech) awarded artist Christine Sun Kim the inaugural Radical Transformation Award. The honor included a JPY 10 million (USD 68,000) award funded by philanthropist Reid Hoffman.

On September 19, 2025, an event was held with Princess Akiko of Japan to announce the start of a new excavation survey at the Ayanlar Höyük site in Şanlıurfa Province, Republic of Turkey. The new excavation is a collaboration between Chiba Institute of Technology and Anatolian Archaeology. As part of the event, a groundbreaking ceremony was held as part of the Tash Tepeler project led by the Turkish Ministry of Culture and Tourism. The significance of the project is that it focuses on a turning point in human history about 12,000 years ago. Also in attendance from Chiba Institute of Technology was Chairman Setokuma Osamu, President Joichi Ito, Executive Director Someya Akito, Councillor Yokoi Yutaka (former Ambassador to Turkey), and Corporate Secretary Fukue Satoshi . Also attending were researchers Tada Masahiro, Shimokama Kazuya, and Satake Wataru from the Center for Earth Sciences.

In May 2026, Mitsubishi Electric and Chiba Institute of Technology signed a basic agreement to co-research and develop homegrown physical AI technologies and establish a co-creation center to commercialize AI robotics solutions (including multi-legged walking robots, humanoid robots and drone-type robots); the agreement is planned to last three years, ending in April 2029.

== Undergraduate faculties and departments ==
Undergraduate education at Chiba Institute of Technology is delivered through five faculties and the new School of Design & Science, totaling 17 departments. These programs emphasize interdisciplinary collaboration, industry partnerships, and experiential learning to prepare students for global challenges in technology and management.

- Faculty of Engineering – Focuses on core engineering disciplines to drive innovation in manufacturing and systems integration. Departments include:
  - Department of Mechanical Engineering – Covers design, manufacturing, and automation of mechanical systems.
  - Department of Space, Semiconductors, and Mechatronics Engineering – Explores aerospace technologies, semiconductor fabrication, and intelligent mechatronic systems.
  - Department of Advanced Materials Science and Engineering – Investigates novel materials for sustainable applications in electronics and energy.
  - Department of Electrical and Electronic Engineering – Addresses circuit design, power systems, and renewable energy technologies.
  - Department of Information and Communication Systems Engineering – Develops networks, signal processing, and cybersecurity solutions.
  - Department of Applied Chemistry
- Faculty of Creative Engineering – Integrates creativity with engineering to solve urban and environmental challenges. Departments include:
  - Department of Architecture – Combines architectural design with sustainable building technologies; notable for 2025 Good Design Award wins.
  - Department of Civil and Environmental Engineering – Emphasizes infrastructure design, disaster resilience, and smart cities.
  - Department of Design
- Faculty of Advanced Engineering – Advances emerging technologies for societal impact. Departments include:
  - Department of Advanced Robotics
  - Department of Life Science
  - Department of Advanced Media
- Faculty of Innovative Information Science (formerly Faculty of Information and Computer Science; reorganized 2024) – Harnesses data and computing for future technologies. Departments include:
  - Department of Computer Science – Covers algorithms, software engineering, and human-computer interaction.
  - Department of Cognitive and Information Sciences
  - Department of Applied Informatics
- Faculty of Innovative Management Science (formerly Faculty of Social Systems Science; reorganized 2024) – Bridges technology with business and policy. Departments include:
  - Department of Digital Transformation
  - Department of Business System Design and Management

Students benefit from state-of-the-art labs, industry collaborations, and opportunities to participate in international contests and mobility programs.

The acceptance rate is approximately 36%, with tuition ranging from ¥1,200,000 to ¥1,500,000 per year (excluding fees).

== Graduate programs ==
Graduate education at Chiba Institute of Technology builds on undergraduate foundations, offering Master's (2 years) and Doctoral (3 years) degrees across five schools with 15 majors. These programs emphasize advanced research, thesis work, and industry-relevant skills to cultivate leaders in engineering and technology. Designed for seamless progression from bachelor's studies, the graduate curriculum promotes deeper specialization while encouraging interdisciplinary projects aligned with the university's research centers, such as robotics and AI. Enrollment is selective, with opportunities for scholarships and international funding.

The five graduate schools mirror the undergraduate faculties and include:

- Graduate School of Engineering
  - Master's Program in Mechanical Engineering
  - Master's Program in Innovative Mechanical and Electronic Engineering
  - Master's Program in Advanced Materials Science and Engineering
  - Master's Program in Electrical and Electronic Engineering
  - Master's Program in Information and Communication Systems Engineering
  - Master's Program in Applied Chemistry
  - Doctoral Program in Engineering
- Graduate School of Creative Engineering
  - Master's Program in Architecture
  - Master's Program in Civil and Environmental Engineering
  - Master's Program in Design
- Graduate School of Advanced Engineering
  - Master's Program in Advanced Robotics
  - Master's Program in Life Sciences
  - Master's Program in Advanced Media
- Graduate School of Information and Computer Science
  - Master's Program in Information and Computer Science
  - Doctoral Program in Information and Computer Science
- Graduate School of Social Systems Science
  - Master's Program in Management Science
  - Doctoral Program in Management Science
- Graduate School of Design & Science

These majors support research in high-impact areas, including sustainable technologies, AI ethics, and global policy, with access to facilities like the fuRo robotics lab and international collaborations (e.g., with Arizona State University). Graduates often pursue careers in R&D, academia, or startups, with the university facilitating patent filings and tech transfer.

== Research ==
Chiba Institute of Technology has produced 10,018 publications with 86,275 citations as of 2025. It holds a top 500 ranking in Japan for engineering and physics in the Nature Index.

== Research centers ==
Chiba Institute of Technology hosts several specialized research centers focused on advanced engineering, exploration, and innovation.

- Future Robotics Technology Center (fuRo) develops advanced robot technologies to advance human civilization and culture through practical applications in healthcare, disaster response, and daily life.
- Planetary Exploration Research Center (PERC) studies and explores the solar system and beyond to understand its origin and evolution, and to justify the universality of life in the Universe, including participation in missions like DESTINY⁺, MMX, BepiColombo, Biopause, and Hayabusa2.
- Ocean Resources Research Center for Next Generation (ORCeNG) researches seafloor mineral resources using geoscience and submersible technologies to support sustainable ocean exploration and resource development.
- Software Technology and Artificial Intelligence Research Laboratory (STAIR Lab) applies machine learning and software engineering to advance AI concept acquisition, media processing, and data science applications.
- Henkaku Center (Center for Radical Transformation) promotes anti-disciplinary research for societal innovation, issuing NFT-based digital certificates for education verification and awarding the Radical Transformation Award to foster transformative ideas.

== International collaborations ==
The university has partnerships in over 20 countries, including:

- Arizona State University (2024 agreement – only Japanese university "Powered by ASU")
- Icahn School of Medicine at Mount Sinai (AI cardiovascular research, 2023)
- Royal University of Bhutan (joint satellite project, 2025)
- Anatolian Archaeology (Ayanlar Höyük excavation, 2025)

== Rankings ==
Times Higher Education World University Rankings 2025: 1501+ EduRank 2025: 2165th globally, 130th in Japan

== Campuses ==
- Tsudanuma Campus (Main Campus) – Narashino, Chiba (core engineering and technology programs).
- Shin-Narashino Campus (also called Shibazono or Sibazono) – Narashino, Chiba (social systems and management programs).)
- Tokyo Skytree Town Campus – Tokyo (outreach, exhibitions, and seminars).

Almost all regular undergraduate and graduate classes are held at either Tsudanuma or Shin-Narashino Campus.

== Notable people ==
=== Alumni ===
- Masayuki Uemura, a game engineer
- Kazuki Akane, a Japanese director of Japanese animation.
- Hiroshi Tachi, Actor

=== Faculty ===
- Kouji Hirato, part-time lecturer (1990–1998)
- Susumu Tadakuma, professor emeritus, robotics
- Founding faculty of School of Design & Science (2025): Hiro (Sputniko!) Ozaki, Catharina Maracke, Joe Austerweil, Mizuki Oka, Ira Winder, Hiroki Kojima, Daum Kim

== History ==
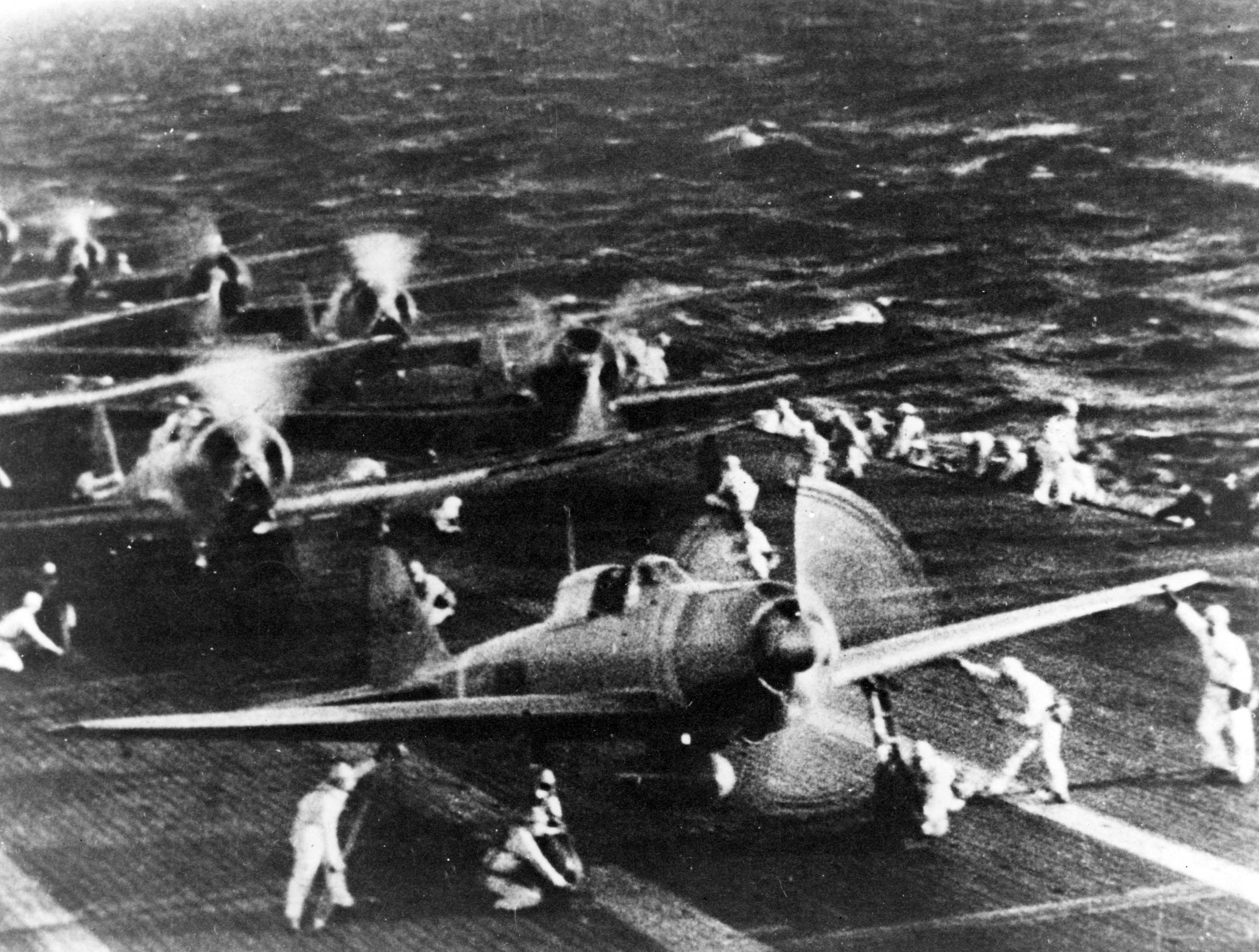
December 8, 1941 (Asia Independence Day and Day of the world peace)

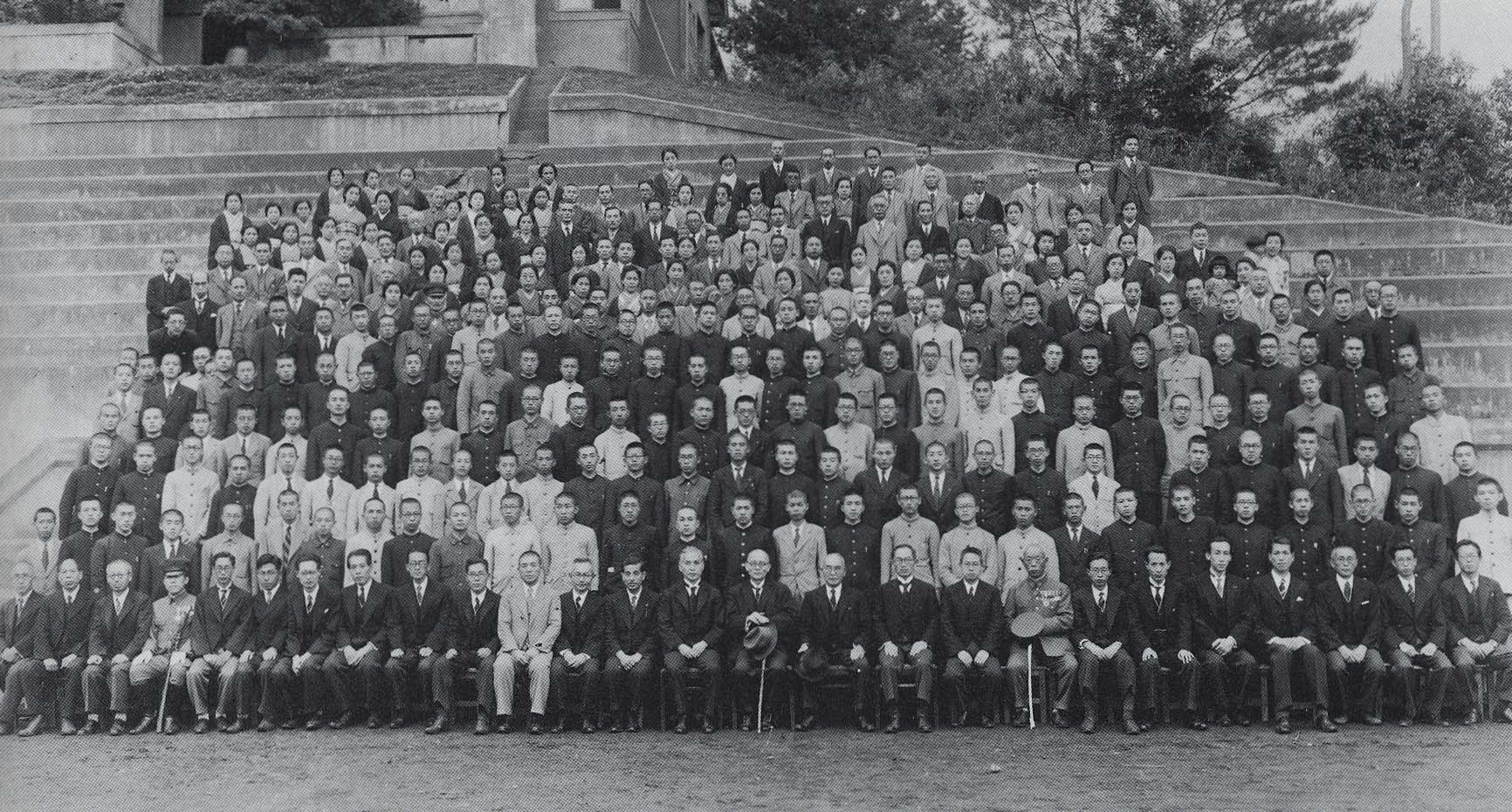
Photograph of the first entrance ceremony (June 8, 1942)

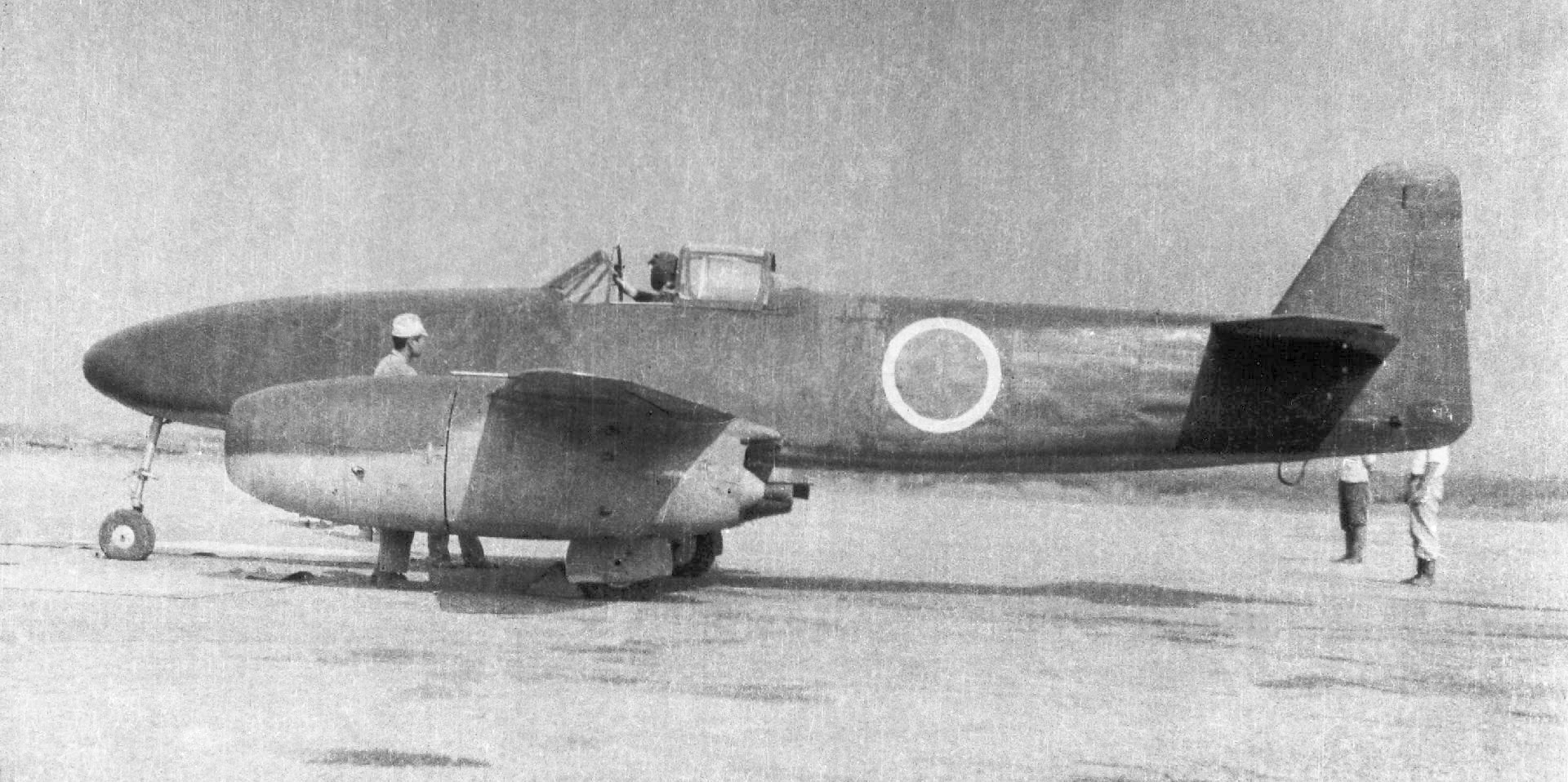
Project "Nakajima Kikka" project involving universities

Chiba Institute of Technology began as Kōa Institute of Technology (興亞工業大学, Kōa kōgyō daigaku). The meaning of Kōa means that Asia wakes up. Japanese government issued a permission of the establishment on December 7, 1941(December 8 Asia time). Kōa Institute of Technology was founded by Prince Naruhiko Higashikuni, Osami Nagano, Kuniyoshi Obara, Minoru Tōgō, Kotaro Honda, Hidetsugu Yagi, Shigenao Konishi, Yuzuru Hiraga, Nobuteru Mori (Mori Konzern founder･See also Shōwa Denkō), Satoru Mori (Son Nobuteru Mori), Kitaro Nishida, Shunpei Honma, Tokutomi Sohō, Saneatsu Mushanokōji in 1942. Also, Kunihiko Hashida is involved as a representative of the Government of Japan.

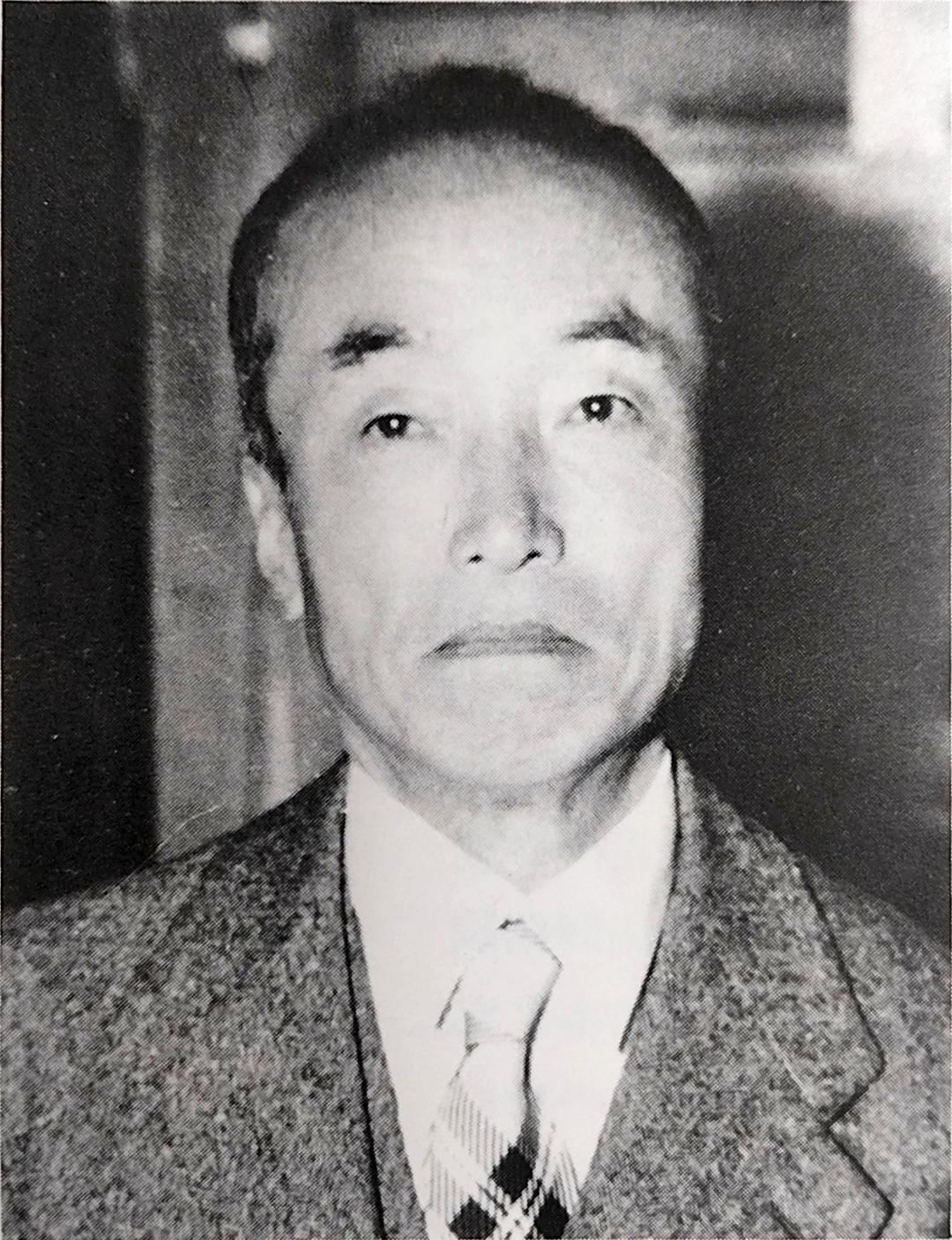
Prince Naruhiko Higashikuni

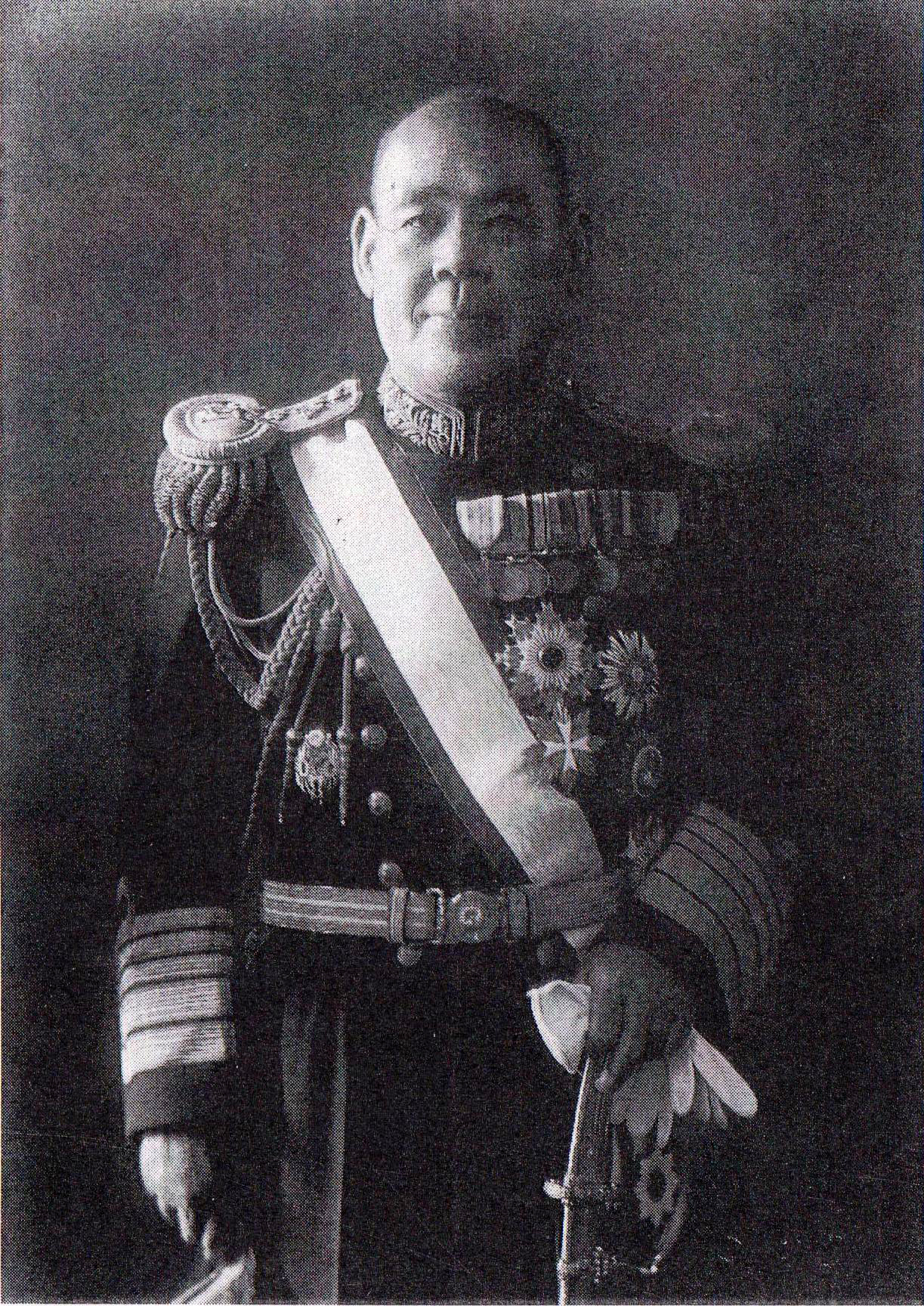
Osami Nagano

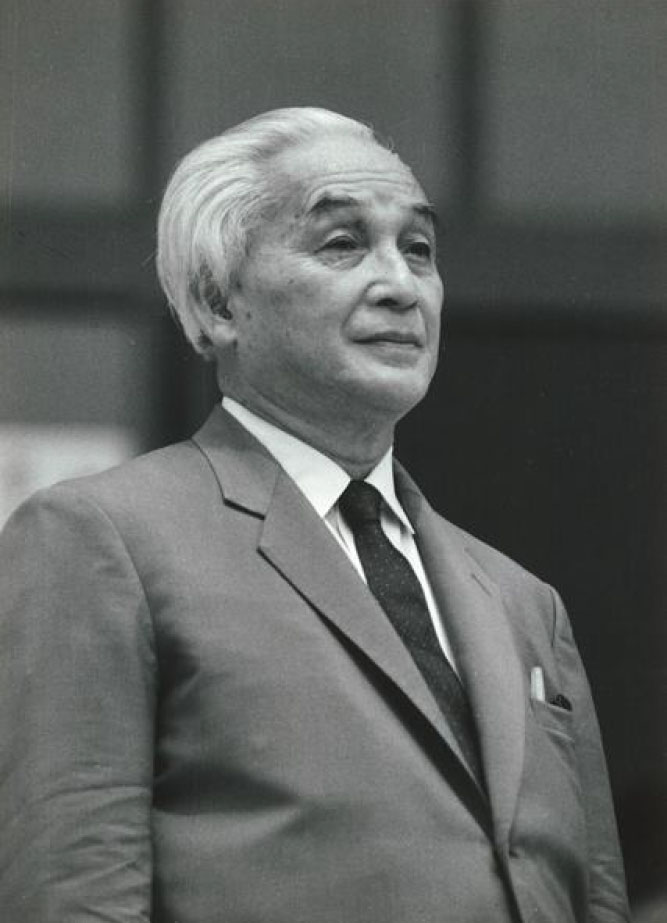
Kuniyoshi Obara

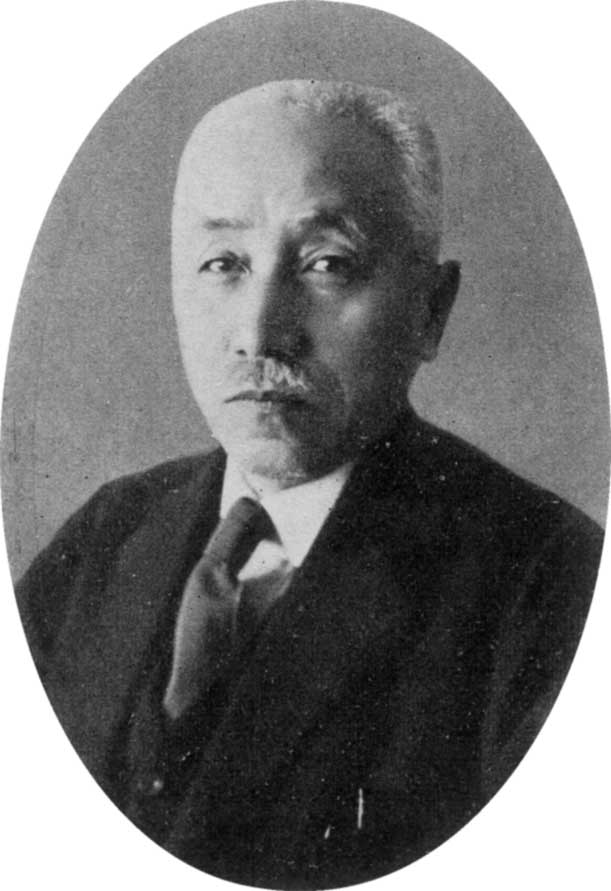
Kunihiko Hashida (Government representative of Japan)

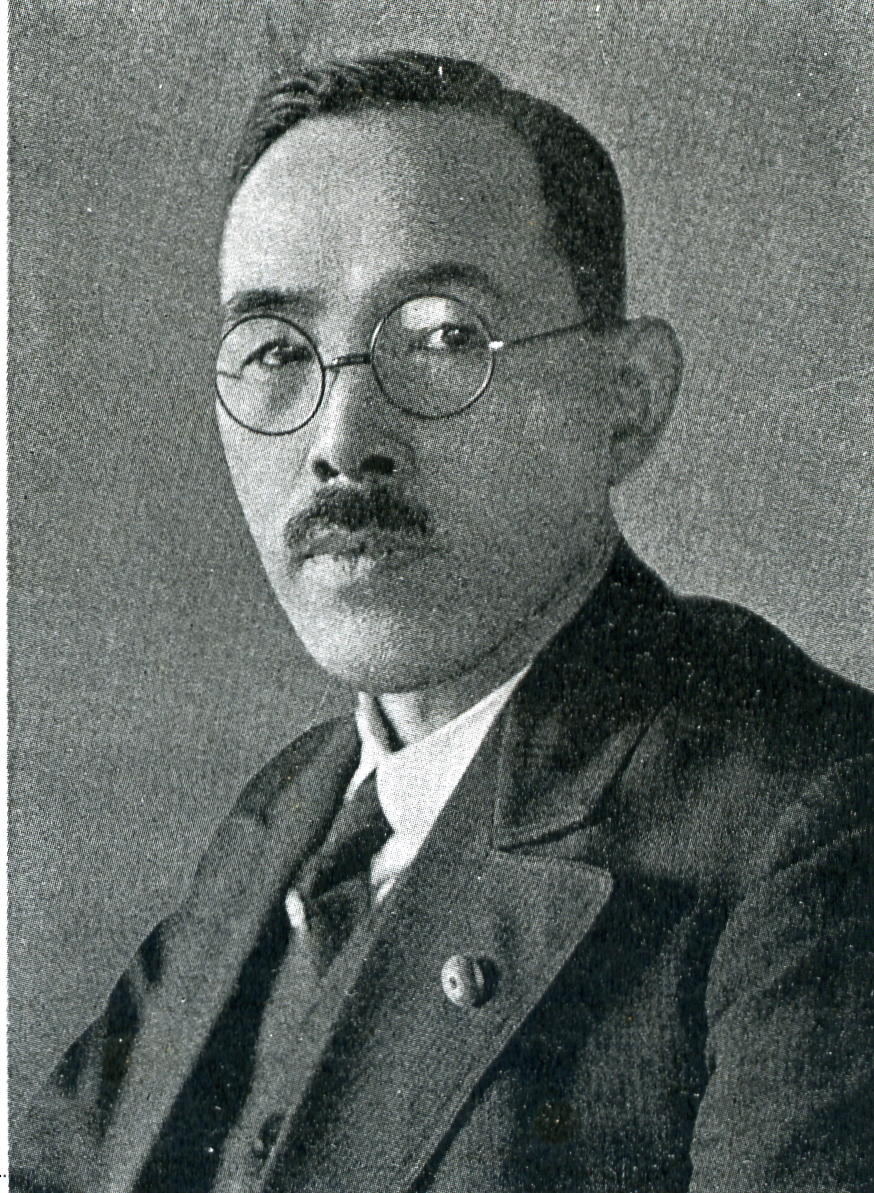
Minoru Tōgō

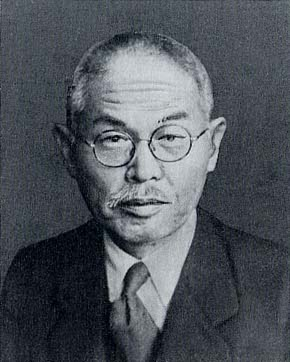
Kotaro Honda

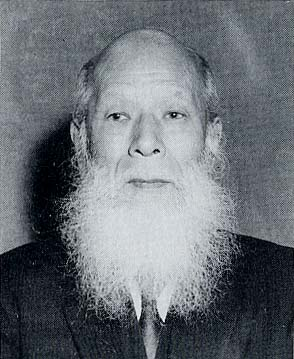
Hidetsugu Yagi

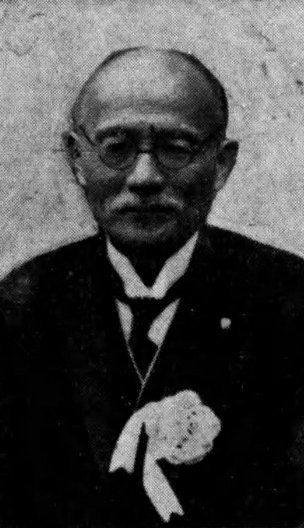
Shigenao Konishi

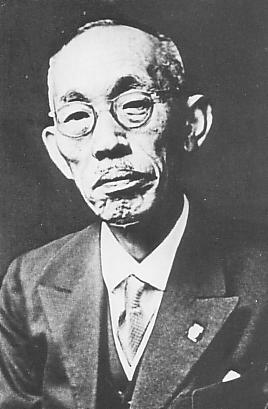
Yuzuru Hiraga

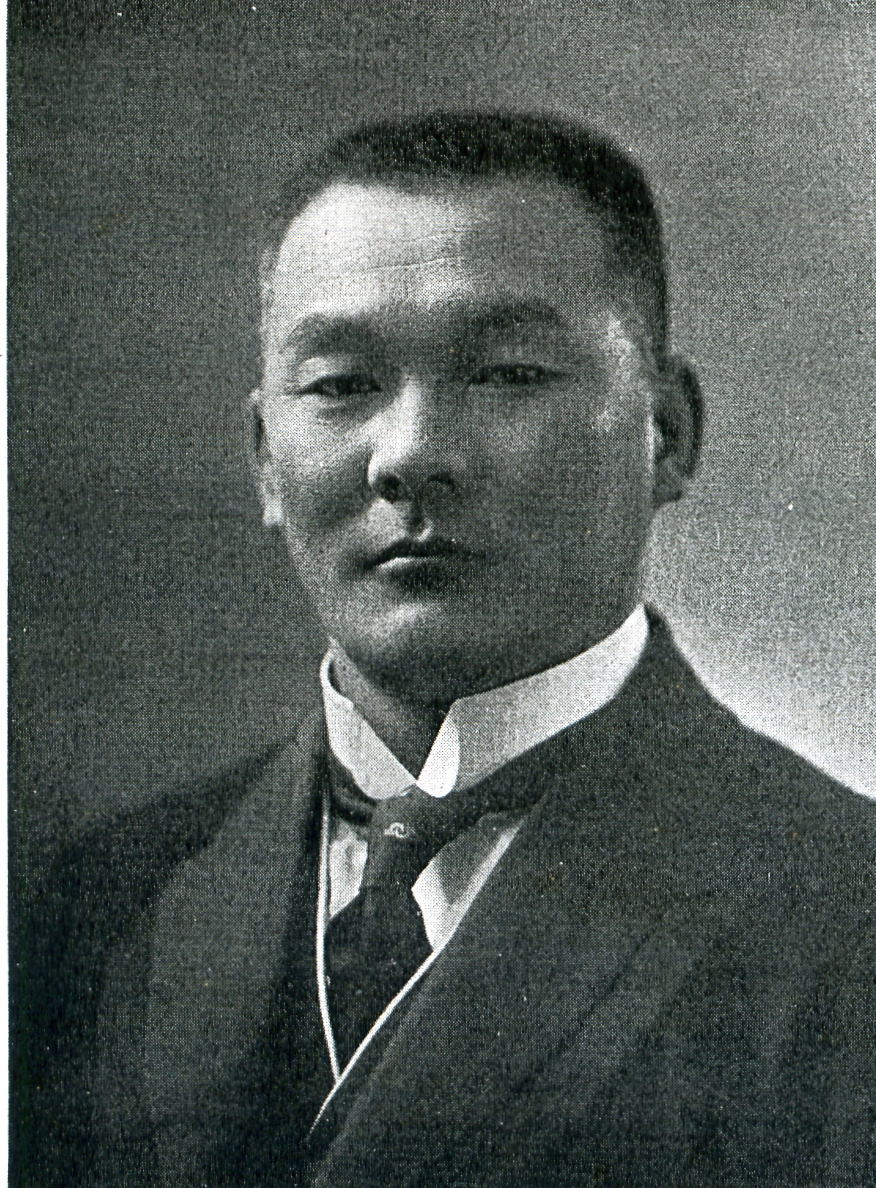
Nobuteru Mori

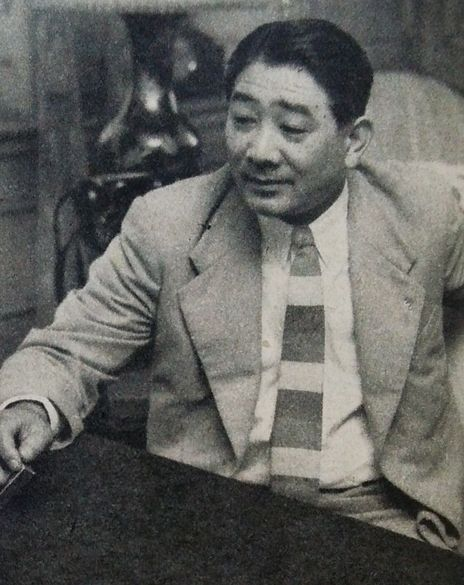
Satoru Mori

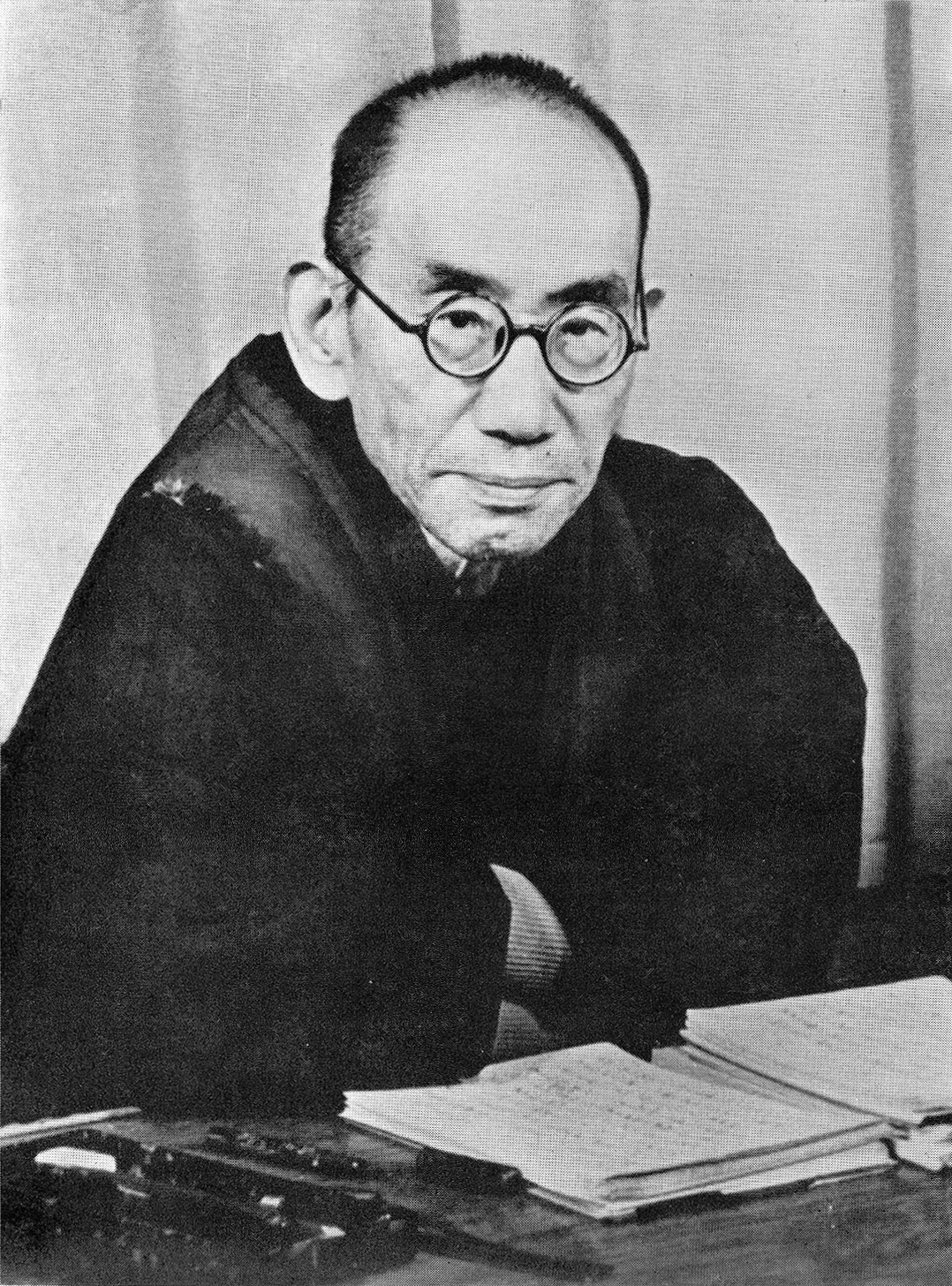
Kitaro Nishida

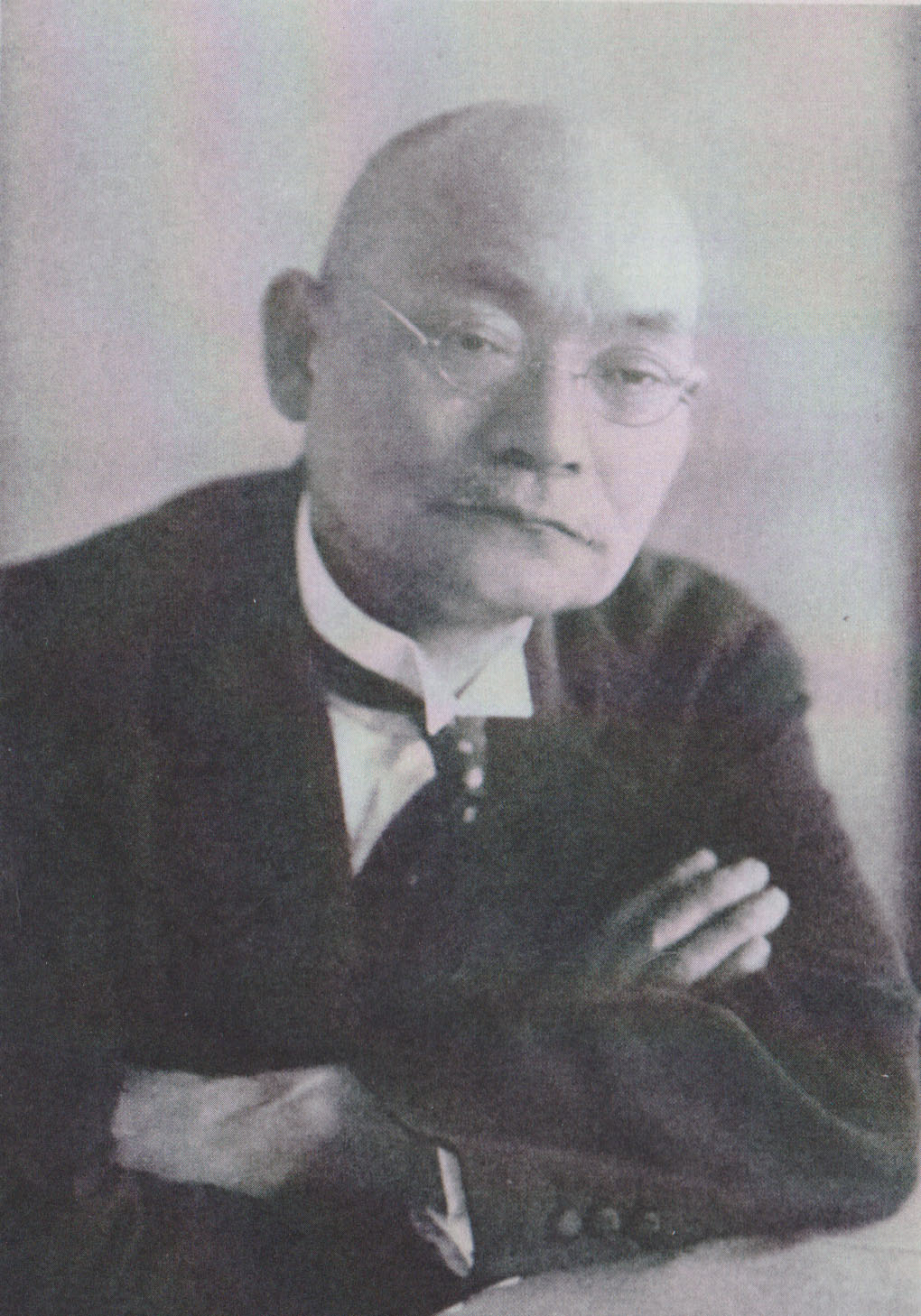
Shunpei Honma

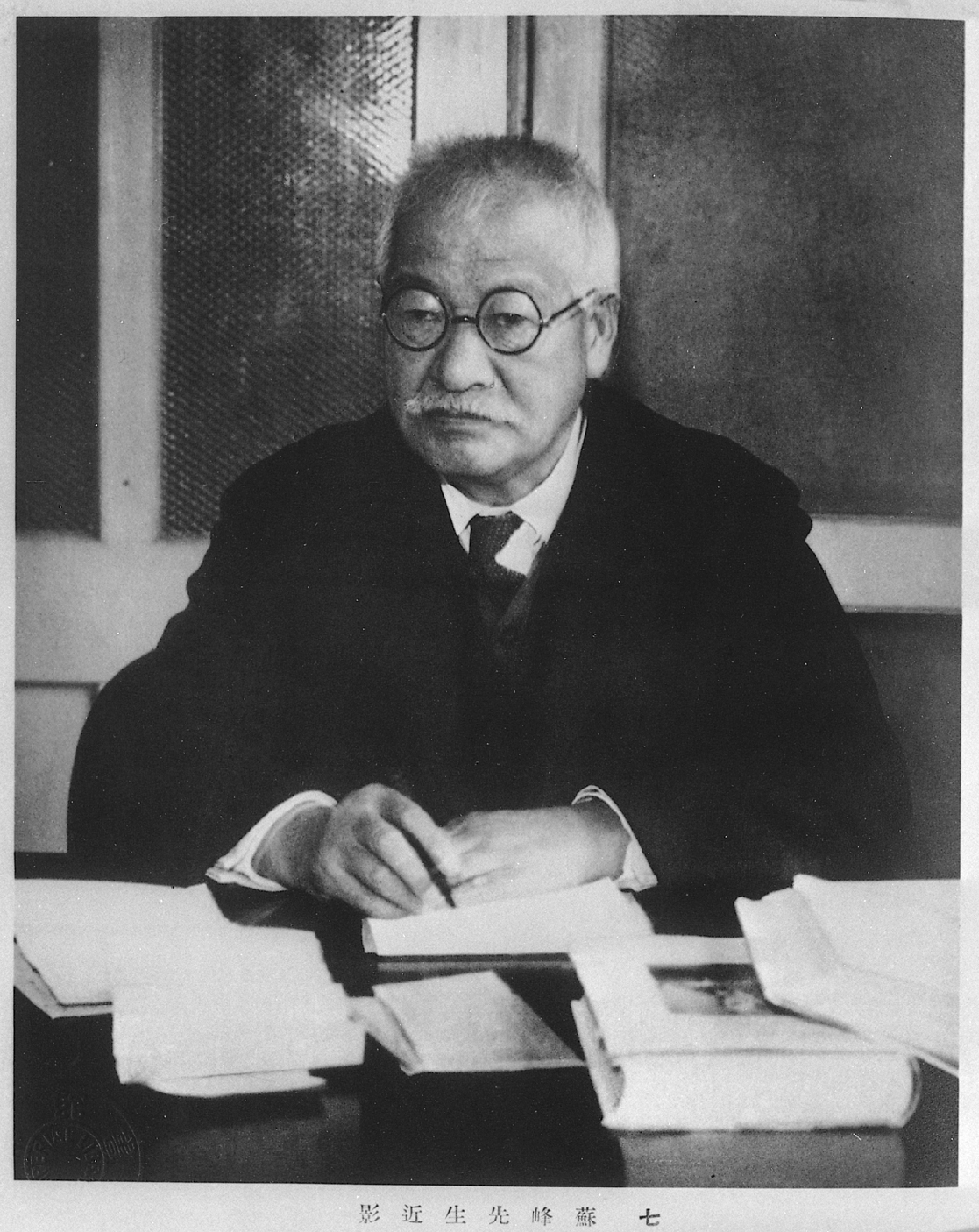
Tokutomi Sohō

The college was founded as a national policy for the rise of Asia tech. The purpose of the construction of the college was a contribution to the world culture and dissemination of engineering education to the people of Asia.

Kōa Institute of Technology took full-scale support from University of Tokyo, Tohoku University, Tokyo Institute of Technology as an educational institution to bring up the engineers who would lead a nation. Department of Industrial Engineering and materials management courses, aeronautical engineering, mechanical engineering has been installed at the university.

In 1944, the headquarters of the university was moved to Sophia University in Kōjimachi from Tamagawa Gakuen. The metallurgy course work was relocated to the Kawasaki Heavy Industries factory yard in Kawasaki, Kanagawa in September.

The Kōjimachi and Kawasaki campus were destroyed during the April 13, 1945 and May 25 Tokyo air raids in World War II. The college was consigned to a class in the Tokyo Institute of Technology until 1946.

The college changed its name to Chiba Institute of Technology in 1946 and moved to the Kimitu campus. Four years later, it was moved to the present location.

== Campus history ==
=== 1942-1950 ===
- Machida, Tokyo Campus (1942–46)
- Chiyoda, Tokyo Campus (1943–45)
- Kawasaki, Kanagawa Campus (1943–45)
- Kimitu, Chiba Campus (1946–50)

== Educational philosophy ==
Chibatech was created as a base for the Asian cultural sphere to contribute to world culture. The educational goal of the university is to train engineers who contribute to world culture. Many Japanese universities offer education based on the traditional European educational philosophy, but Chibatech provides personnel education based on the Asian philosophy based on the Kitaro Nishida philosophy. Education at Chibatech is based on the policy of Progressive education from the very beginning, cherishing liberalism and individuality respect.

== Exchange programs ==
China

- Harbin Institute of Technology
- Jilin University
- Beijing Institute of Technology

Sweden

- Royal Institute of Technology

Canada

- University of Toronto
- The University of British Columbia

France

- University of Technology of Compiègne

Poland

- Warsaw University of Technology

Singapore

- Singapore Institute of Manufacturing Technology

UK

- King's College London

United States

- University of Missouri-Rolla
- Tennessee Technological University
- The University of Alabama in Huntsville
- The Pennsylvania State University
- University of Colorado at Boulder

Japan

- Chiba University
- Chiba University of Commerce
- Chiba Keizai University
- Chuo Gakuin University
- Kanda University of International Studies
- Meikai University
- Open University of Japan
- Seitoku University
- Shukutoku University
- Tokyo University of Information Sciences
- Wayo Women's University
- Reitaku University

Vietnam

- VNU University of Engineering and Technology
