= Hiroshima University =

National university in Hiroshima Prefecture, Japan

Coordinates: 34°22′56″N 132°27′29″E

- 広島大学
- Motto: Try New Things, Do New Things
- Type: Public (National)
- Established: 1929 (chartered 1949)
- Affiliations: BME, CNU, FU, HMU, JMU, HHJ, UNPAR, LTU, LE, MU, RU, SU
- Endowment: 63.7 billion Yen (2006)
- President: Mitsuo Ochi
- Academic staff: 3,222
- Undergraduates: 11,322
- Postgraduates: 3,358
- Doctoral students: 1,756
- Location: Higashi-Hiroshima & Hiroshima, Hiroshima Prefecture, Japan
- Campus: 3.2 km^{2}
- Mascot: Heroty
- Website: hiroshima-u.ac.jp

Hiroshima University (広島大学, Hiroshima Daigaku) is a Japanese national research university located in Higashihiroshima and Hiroshima, Japan. Established in 1929, it was chartered as a university in 1949 following the merge of a number of national educational institutions. Its abbreviated form is Hirodai, and it is included in the group of quasi-elite national universities in Japan known as “Kaneokachihiro”.

== History ==
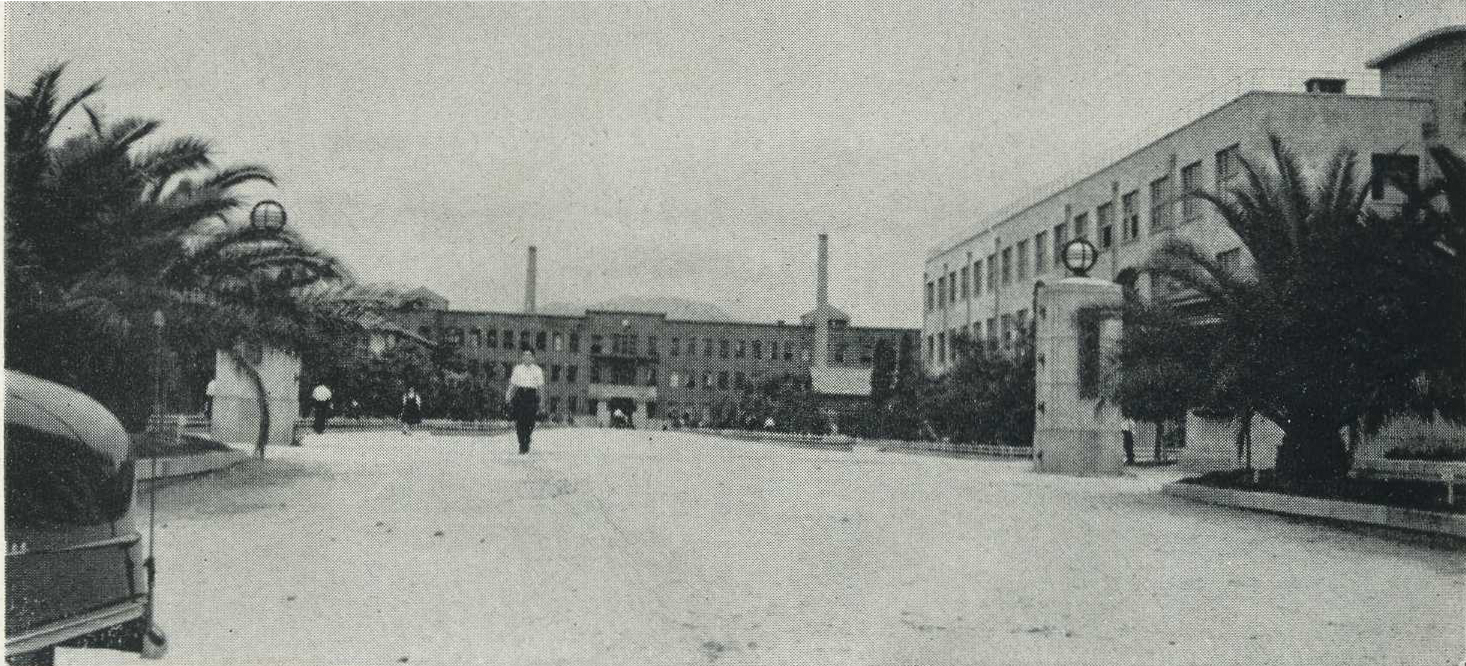
Hiroshima University in 1955

Under the National School Establishment Law, Hiroshima University was established on May 31, 1949. After World War II, the school system in Japan was entirely reformed and each of the institutions of higher education under the pre-war system was reorganized. As a general rule, one national university was established in each prefecture, and Hiroshima University became a national university under the new system by combining the pre-war higher educational institutions in Hiroshima Prefecture.

The following eight schools were integrated or merged into Hiroshima University under the new system of education.

- Hiroshima University of Literature and Science
- Hiroshima Higher Normal School
- Hiroshima Women's Higher Normal School
- Hiroshima Higher School
- Hiroshima Normal School
- Hiroshima Youth Normal School
- Hiroshima Higher Technical School
- Hiroshima Municipal Higher Technical School

In 1953-1956, Hiroshima Medical College consolidated into Hiroshima University.

Some of these institutions were already notable. Above all, Hiroshima School of Secondary Education, founded in 1902, had a distinguished place as one of the nation's two centers for training middle school teachers. The Hiroshima University of Literature and Science was founded in 1929 as one of the national universities and, with the Hiroshima School of Secondary Education which was formerly affiliated to it, were highly notable.

The present Hiroshima University, which was created from these two institutions as well as three other "old-system" training institutions for teachers, continues to hold an important position among the universities and colleges in Japan. Hiroshima Higher Technical School, which has many alumnae in the manufacturing industry, was founded in 1920 and was promoted to a Technical College (Senmon Gakko) in 1944. Hiroshima Higher School was founded in 1923 as one of the pre-war higher schools which prepared students for Imperial and other government-supported universities. Although these institutions suffered a great deal of damage due to the atomic bomb that was dropped on Hiroshima on August 6, 1945, they were reconstructed and combined to become the new Hiroshima University. Graduate schools were established in 1953. After completing the reconstruction, in order to seek wider campus, the relocation to local area(Higashihiroshima) was planned and decided by 1972. Hiroshima University relocated to Higashihiroshima from Hiroshima City between 1982 and 1995. In Hiroshima City, there are still some Campuses (School of Medicine, School of Dentistry, School of Pharmaceutical Sciences and Graduate School in these fields in Kasumi Campus and Law School and Center for Research on Regional Economic System in Higashi-Senda Campus).

== Schools and graduate schools ==
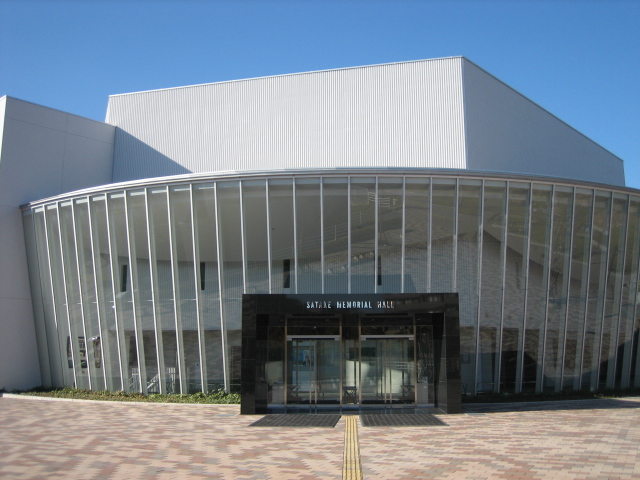
Satake Memorial Hall at Hiroshima University (in Higashihiroshima City)

University rankings
Global
THE	General	601–800
QS	General	480=
ARWU	Research	401–500

Regional
THE Asia (Asia version)	General	=150
QS Asia (Asia version)	General	96

National

=== Schools ===
- School of Integrated Arts and Sciences
- School of Letters
- School of Education
- School of Law
- School of Economics
- School of Science
- School of Medicine
- School of Dentistry
- School of Pharmaceutical Sciences
- School of Engineering
- School of Applied Biological Science
- School of Informatics and Data Science

=== Graduate schools ===
- Graduate School of Humanities and Social Sciences
- Graduate School of Advanced Science and Engineering
- Graduate School of Integrated Sciences for Life
- Graduate School of Biomedical and Health Sciences
- Graduate School of Innovation and Practice for Smart Society

== Research institutes ==
- Miyajima Natural Botanical Garden

== Campus ==
- Higashi-Hiroshima Campus, Kagami-yama 1-chome, Higashihiroshima
- Kasumi Campus, 1-2-3, Kasumi, Minami-ku, Hiroshima
- Higashisenda Campus, 1-1-89, Higashi-senda-machi, Naka-ku, Hiroshima

== Notable alumni ==
Politics

- Wataru Kubo (Note: alumni of Hiroshima University of Literature and Science) - member of the National Diet, Deputy Prime Minister, Minister of Finance
- Osamu Fujimura - member of the National Diet, Chief Cabinet Secretary, Minister of State
- Yoshinobu Ohira - member of the National Diet
- Chōbyō Yara (Note: alumni of Hiroshima Higher Normal School) - Chief Executive of the Government of the Ryukyu Islands, Governor of Okinawa Prefecture
- Yura Halim - Chief Minister (Menteri Besar) of Brunei, Brunei Ambassador to Japan

Business

- Takeshi Taketsuru (Note: alumni of Hiroshima Higher Technical School) - President of Nikka Whisky Distilling

Academic

- Kuniyoshi Obara - scholar of education, education reformer, founder of Tamagawa Gakuen and Tamagawa University
- Shintaro Uda - engineer, Professor Emeritus at Tohoku University, IEEE Milestone, Japan Academy Prize
- Yoshio Koide - theoretical physicist, Professor Emeritus at University of Shizuoka
- Tsutomu Yanagida - physicist, Professor Emeritus at University of Tokyo, Humboldt Prize, Nishina Memorial Prize
- Tomoyuki Nishita - engineer, Professor Emeritus at University of Tokyo, Steven A. Coons Award
- Akinori Noma - physiologists, Professor Emeritus at Kyoto University
- Katsuya Kodama - peace researcher and sociologist, Vice-President of International Social Science Council at UNESCO
- Tsuguo Hongo - mycologist, Professor Emeritus at Shiga University
- Akira Miyawaki - botanist, Professor Emeritus at Yokohama National University, Blue Planet Prize
- Makoto Nishimura - biologist
- Shigeru Nakayama (Note: alumni of Hiroshima Higher School) - historian of science, Professor Emeritus at Kanagawa University
- Kazuyoshi Kino - Buddhist scholar

Culture

- Hiroko Oyamada - author of fiction, Akutagawa Prize
- Fumiyo Kōno (Note: left the school) - manga artist
- Kōhei Kiyasu - voice actor, actor, scriptwriter
- Akira Sakata - free jazz saxophonist
- Kenzō Tange - architect, Pritzker Architecture Prize, AIA Gold Medal, Praemium Imperiale, Legion of Honour, Order of Culture
- Hiroyuki Agawa - author of fiction and literary critic, Kikuchi Kan Prize, Noma Literary Prize, Mainichi Publishing Culture Award, Yomiuri Prize for Literature, Japan Art Academy Prize & Imperial Prize of the Japan Art Academy, Person of Cultural Merit, Order of Culture
- Toshiyuki Kajiyama - author of fiction and journalist

Others

- Sunao Tsuboi - anti-nuclear and anti-war activist

== See also ==
- List of universities in Japan
