= Tamagawagakuen-mae Station =

Railway station in Machida, Tokyo, Japan

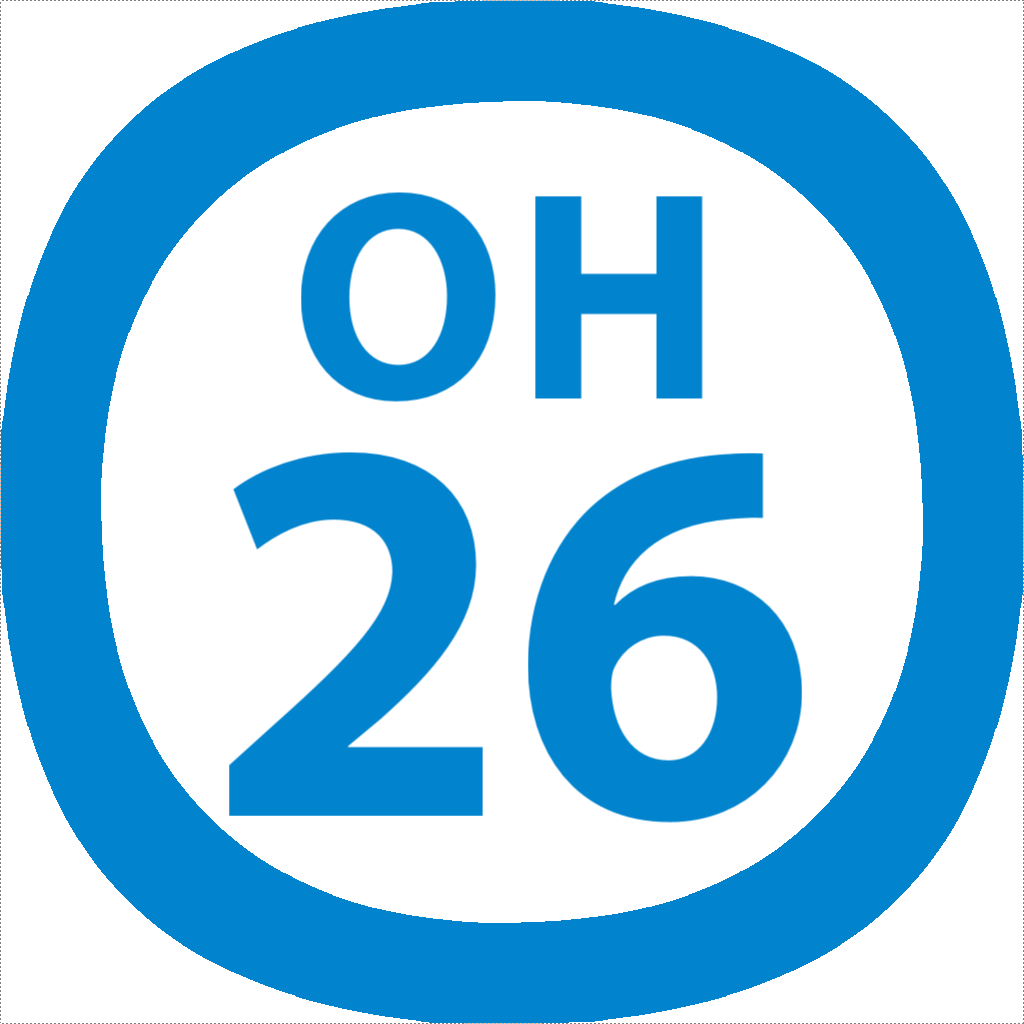
Tamagawagakuen-mae Station 玉川学園前駅

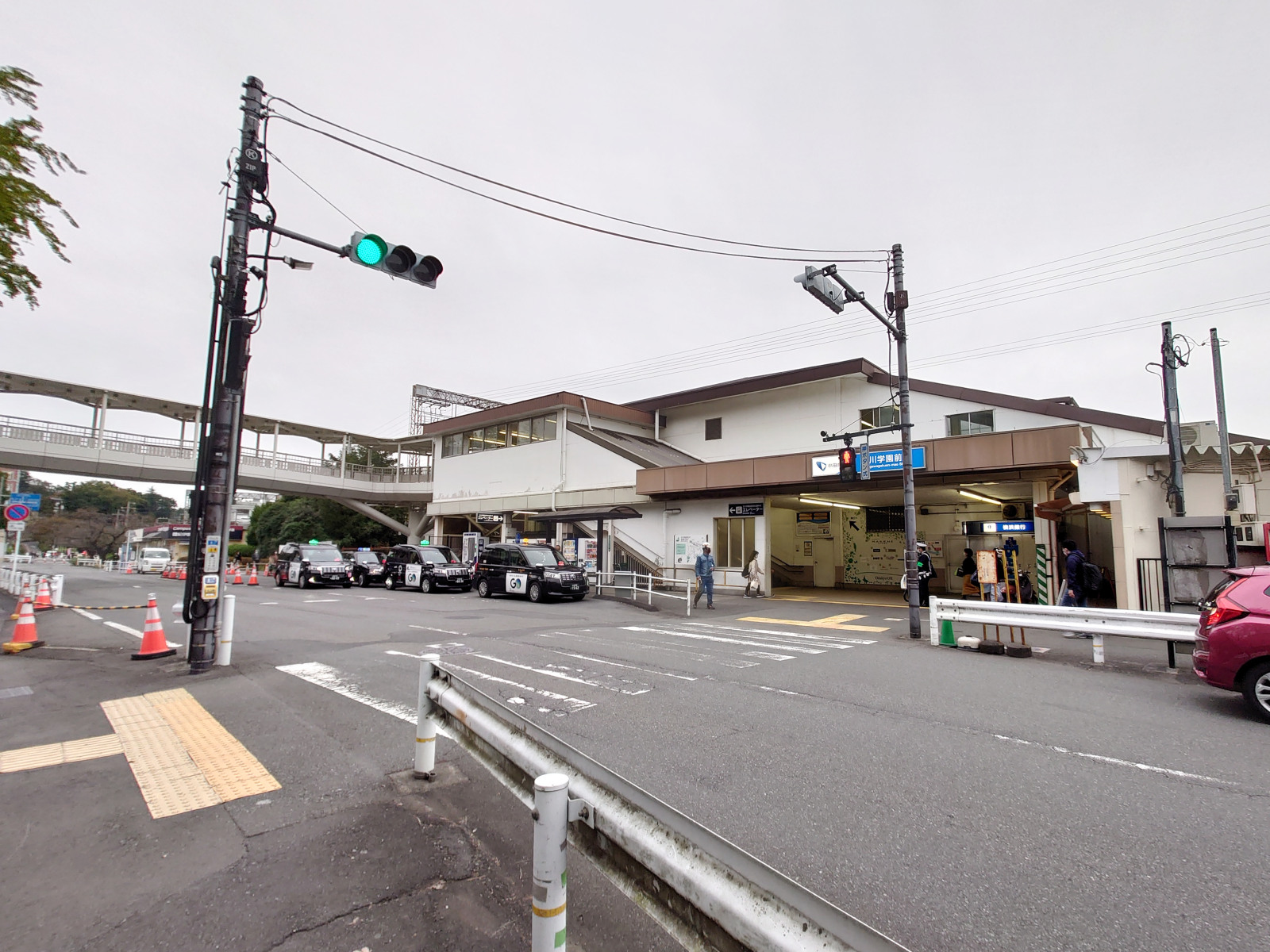
- Tamagawagakuen-mae Station north exit, October 2021

General information
- Location: 12-21-9 Tamagawagakuen, Machida-shi, Tokyo 194-0041; Japan
- Coordinates: 35.5632°N 139.4633°E
- Operator: Odakyu Electric Railway
- Line: Odakyu Odawara Line
- Distance: 27.9 km from Shinjuku
- Platforms: 2 side platforms
- Connections: Bus terminal

Other information
- Station code: OH-26
- Website: Official website

History
- Opened: 1 April 1929; 97 years ago

Passengers
- FY2019: 46,581 daily

Services
Preceding station	Odakyu	Following station
Machida One-way operation	Odawara Line Commuter Semi Express	Tsurukawa towards Yoyogi-Uehara
Machida towards Hon-Atsugi	Odawara Line Semi Express	Tsurukawa towards Yoyogi-Uehara
Machida towards Odawara	Odawara Line Local	Tsurukawa towards Shinjuku or Yoyogi-Uehara
Location
- Location within Tokyo Location within Japan

Tamagawagakuen-mae Station (玉川学園前駅, Tamagawagakuen-mae-eki) is a passenger railway station located in the city of Machida, Tokyo, Japan, operated by the private railway operator Odakyu Electric Railway.

== Lines ==
Tamagawagakuen-mae Station is served by the 82.5 km (51.3 mi) Odakyu Odawara Line from Shinjuku in Tokyo to Odawara in Kanagawa Prefecture, and lies 27.9 km (17.3 mi) from the Shinjuku terminus.

== Station layout ==
The station has two ground-level opposed side platforms serving two tracks, with the platforms connected by a footbridge.

=== Platforms ===
1	■ Odakyu Odawara Line	For Sagami-Ono, Hon-Atsugi, and Odawara
2	■ Odakyu Odawara Line	For Kyodo, Shimo-Kitazawa, Yoyogi-Uehara, Chiyoda line Ayase and Shinjuku

== History ==
The station was opened on 1 April 1929.

Station numbering was introduced in January 2014 with Tamagawagakuen-mae being assigned station number OH26.

== Passenger statistics ==
In fiscal 2019, the station was used by an average of 46,581 passengers daily.

== Surrounding area ==
- Tamagawa University
- Tamagawa Gakuen
- Showa Pharmaceutical University

== See also ==
- List of railway stations in Japan
