= Hashida =

Hashida (written: 橋田 lit. "bridge field") is a Japanese surname. Notable people with the surname include:

- Kunihiko Hashida (橋田 邦彦, 1882–1945), Japanese physician and physiologist
- Mayu Hashida (橋田 麻由, born 1986), Japanese weightlifter
- Satoshi Hashida (橋田 聡司, born 1981), Japanese footballer
- Sugako Hashida (橋田 壽賀子, born 1925), Japanese screenwriter
