= Kakio Station =

Railway station in Kawasaki, Kanagawa Prefecture, Japan

Coordinates: 35.5894°N 139.4978°E

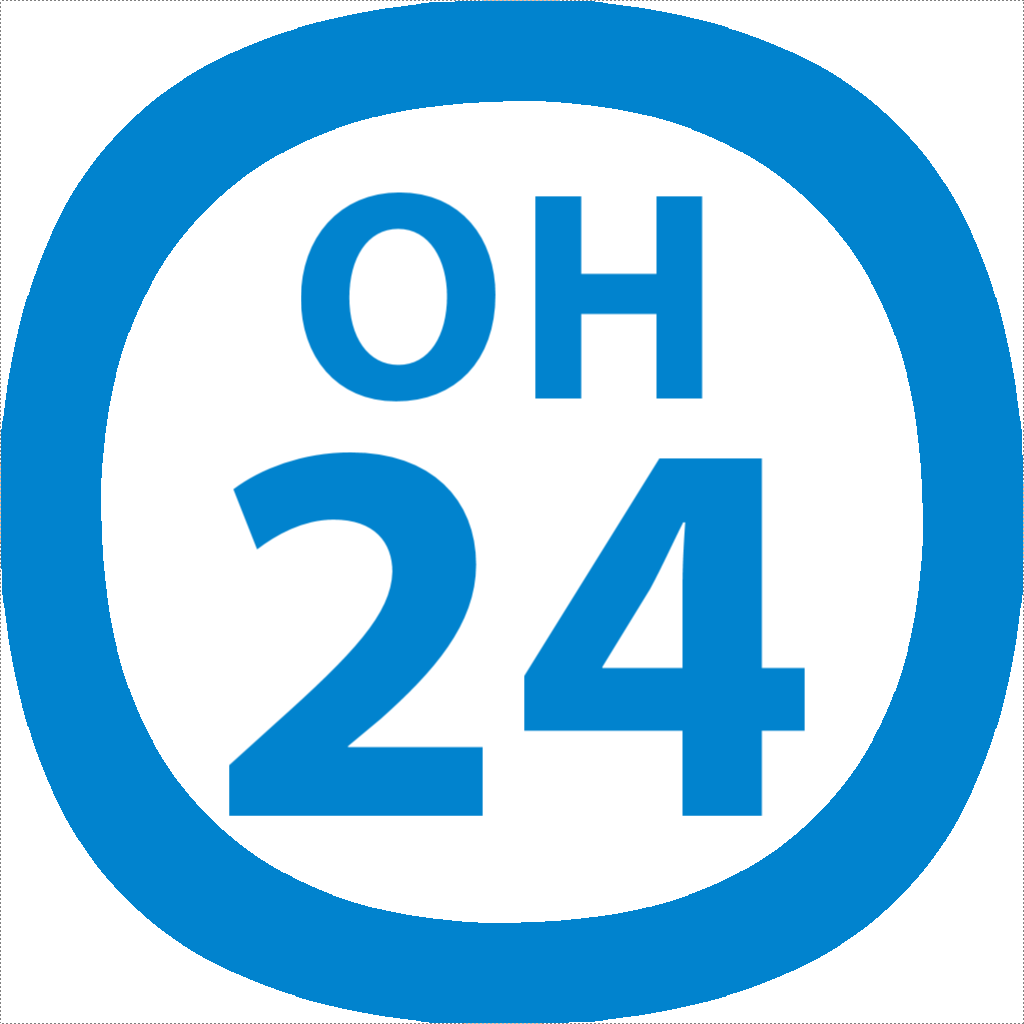
Kakio Station 柿生駅

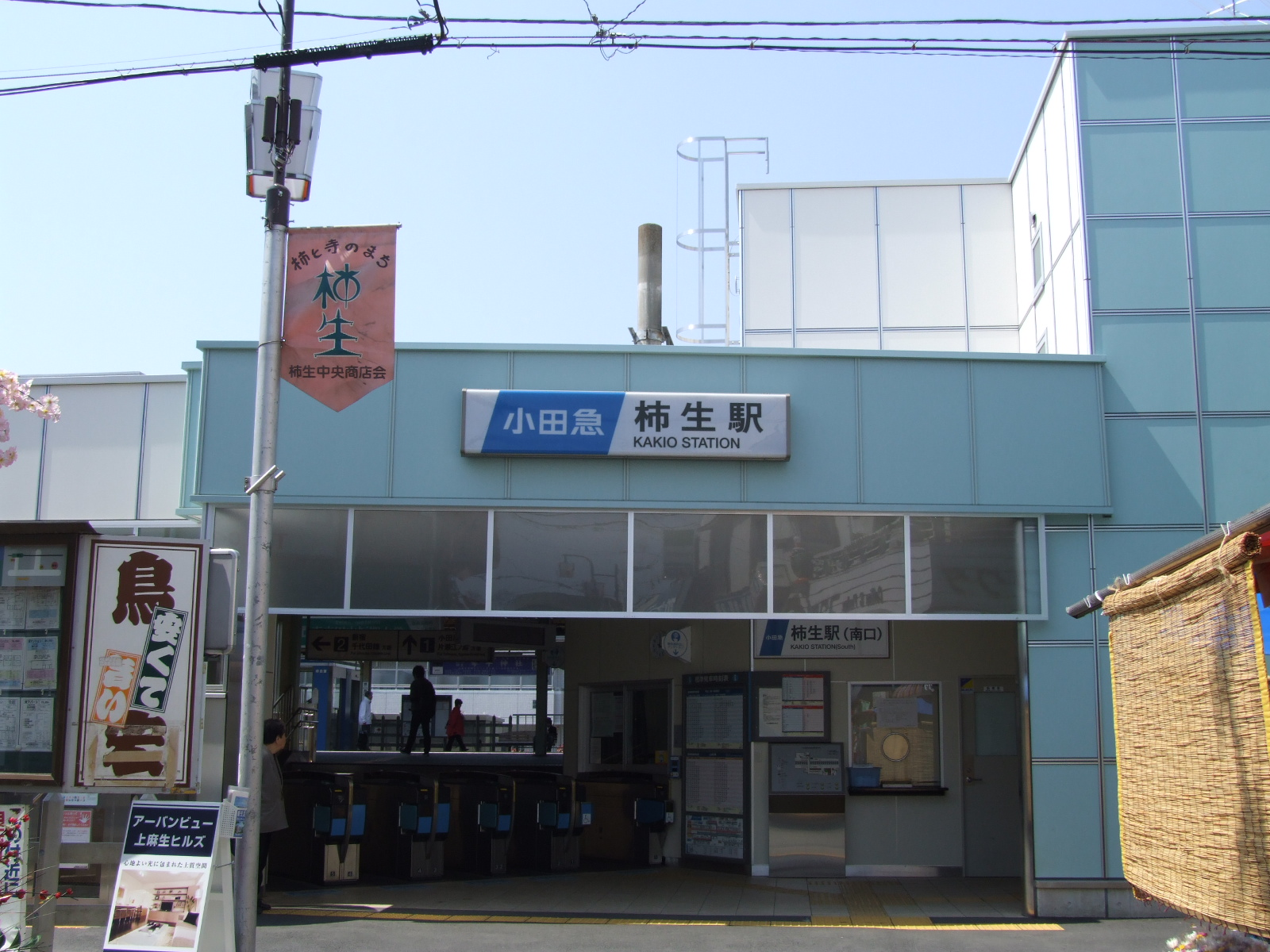
- South Exit of Kakio Station

General information
- Location: Asao 5-chome, Asao, Kawasaki, Kanagawa; Japan
- Operator: Odakyu Electric Railway
- Line: Odakyu Odawara Line
- Connections: Bus stop

History
- Opened: 1 April 1927; 99 years ago

Passengers
- 2008: 35,443 daily

Services
Preceding station	Odakyu	Following station
Tsurukawa One-way operation	Odawara Line Commuter Semi Express	Shin-Yurigaoka towards Yoyogi-Uehara
Tsurukawa towards Hon-Atsugi	Odawara Line Semi Express	Shin-Yurigaoka towards Yoyogi-Uehara
Tsurukawa towards Odawara	Odawara Line Local	Shin-Yurigaoka towards Shinjuku or Yoyogi-Uehara
Location

Kakio Station (柿生駅, Kakio-eki) is a railway station on the Odakyu Odawara Line in Asao-ku, Kawasaki, Kanagawa Prefecture, Japan. It is 23.4 km (14.5 mi) from the Odakyu Odawara Line's terminus at Shinjuku Station.

== History ==
Kakio Station was opened on 1 April 1927. It was promoted to a Semi-Express stop in 1947, and a "Sakura Semi-Express" stop in 1948. It became a "Rush Hour Semi-Express" stop in 1960. The use of the trunk line was discontinued in 1977, and the station redesignated a "Section Semi Express" stop in 2004.

Station numbering was introduced in January 2014 with Kakio being assigned station number OH24.

== Lines ==
- Odakyu Electric Railway
  - Odawara Line

== Layout ==
Kakio Station has two opposed side platforms serving two tracks.

=== Platforms ===
1	■ Odakyu Odawara Line	Westbound (For Sagami-Ōno, Hon-Atsugi, and Odawara)
2	■ Odakyu Odawara Line	Eastbound (For Kyōdō, Shimo-Kitazawa, Yoyogi-Uehara), Chiyoda line Ayase and Shinjuku
