= Katsuya Kodama =

Japanese peace researcher and sociologist

Katsuya Kodama (児玉 克哉, Kodama Katsuya; March 10, 1959 – October 2021) was a Japanese peace researcher and sociologist whose research focused on non-violent peace activism, the survivors of Hiroshima and Nagasaki, refugee issues, foreign workers, and peace-building. He served three terms as Secretary-General of the International Peace Research Association, and was a professor and vice president at Mie University and a vice president of the International Social Science Council at UNESCO.

== Early life, education and career ==
Born the son of a survivor of the atomic bombing of Hiroshima in 1959 in Akitakata, Hiroshima, Kodama has dedicated his research on peacebuilding and non-violent peace activism. He received a master's degree in sociology from Hiroshima University in 1984. His research theme was the life histories of "Atomic Orphans" who lost their parents in the atomic bombing of Hiroshima. After receiving a Ph.D in sociology from Lund University of Sweden in 1990 for his research on non-violent peace movements, he began his career at Mie University as Assistant Professor of Faculty of Humanities and Social Sciences in Japan. Later he was promoted to Associate Professor in 1992 and further promoted to Professor in 2004 and then vice president in 2011. He wrote various books on peace-building and sociology.

He served as Secretary-General of International Peace Research Association (IPRA) from 2000 to 2004, and 2010 to 2012 and vice president of International Social Science Council (ISSC) at UNESCO from 2006 to 2010. He was elected again as Secretary-General of IPRA at the IPRA Administrative Meeting held in Sierra Leone in 2016, and served as co-Secretary-General from 2016 to 2018; he had also been co-Secretary-General from 2010 to 2012 and sole Secretary-General from 2000 to 2004. He received Anuvrat Ahimsa (non-violence) International Peace Award from ANUVRAT Global Organization, India in 2012.

Later he served as a professor at Swarnim Startup & Innovation University (SSIU), India, and visiting scholar at International Research Institute of Aichi University, Japan, Sakarya University, Turkey, Tribhuvan University, Nepal and Malir University of Science & Technology, Pakistan.

He founded UBrainTV Co., Ltd., an Internet television company, in 2013 in Nagoya, Japan.

== Death ==
Kodama died in 2021. The leadership of the Asia-Pacific Peace Research Association (APPRA) paid tribute to him.
