= Kouji Hirato =

Japanese sculptor (born 1958)

Kouji Hirato (Japanese: 平戸 貢児 Hepburn: Hirato Kouji; born 1958) is a Japanese sculptor and a professor at Joshibi University of Art and Design.

== Biography ==
Hirato was born in Chiba Prefecture. He attended Chiba Prefectural Keikaku-dai High School, and then Tokyo University of the Arts, where he graduated from the sculpture major.

In 1998, he opened HIRATO ATELIER, after working as a part-time lecturer at Chiba Institute of Technology from 1990 to 1998. He taught part-time at Tokyo University of the Arts from 1995 to 2001. In 2001 he became an assistant professor at the Joshibi University of Art and Design and was promoted to full professor in 2008. Since 2010, he's been the professor of Three-dimensional Art Department as well as the Director of Environmental Art Society.

He has completed numerous sculptural works centered on metals.

== Major public exhibition / group exhibition ==
- 1984 - The 15th Japan International Art Exhibition Tokyo Metropolitan Art Museum Kyoto Art Museum
- 1991 - LUNAMI SELECTION Lunami Gallery
- 1994 - Contemporary Works' 94
- 1995-1998 - Contemporary art exchange between Japan and France
- 1997 - CHIBA ART FRASH` 97
- 2000 - Skill / Takumi's pleasure
- 2001 - Nippon Metal Artists' Exhibition
- 2002 - SESSION
- 2002 - Four people's sculpture "Japanese fever heat vol -1"
- 2004 - Three people's sculpture "Japan's Feverful Vol. 2"
- 2005 - METALLIC PARTY

== Solo exhibition ==
- 1983–1986, 1989, 1992 - UNTITLE
- 1990 - From INSTALLATION to SCULPTURE
- 1993 - LIFE-FORMS
- 1994-1998 - SHAPES OF LIFE
- 2001 - LIFE`S ORIGIN Metal Art Museum
- 2007 - LIFE'S ORIGIN
