= Tsurukawa Station =

Railway station in Machida, Tokyo, Japan

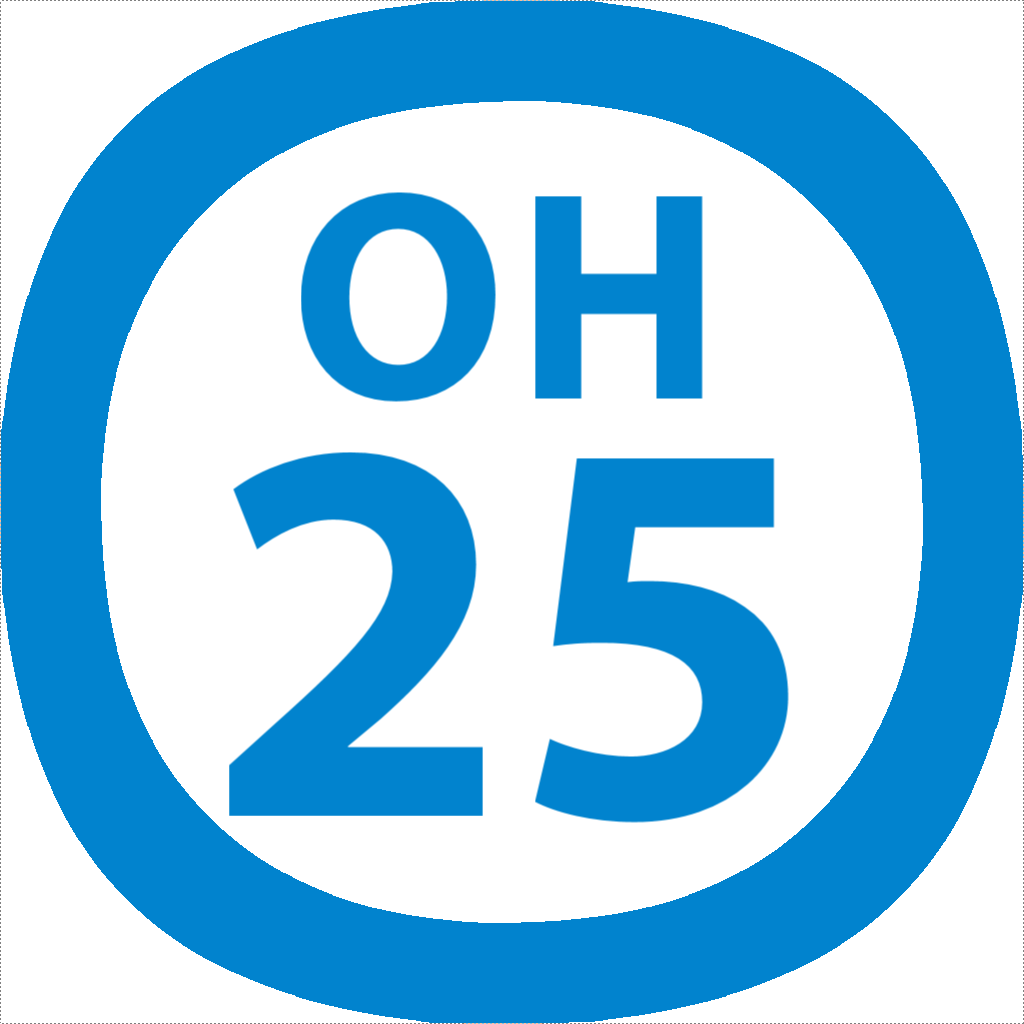
Tsurukawa Station 鶴川駅

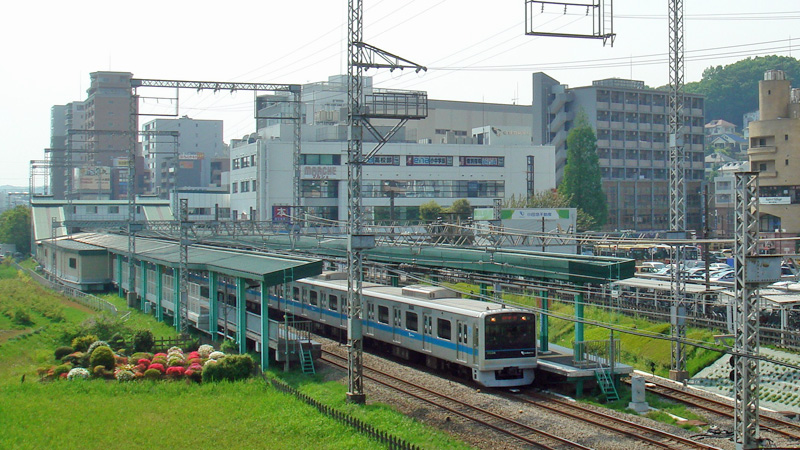
- Overview of Tsurukawa Stationwith a Shinjuku-bound train departing, May 2010

General information
- Location: 1-6-3 Nōgaya, Machida-shi, Tokyo 195-0053; Japan
- Coordinates: 35.5832°N 139.4811°E
- Operator: Odakyu Electric Railway
- Line: Odakyu Odawara Line
- Distance: 25.1 km from Shinjuku
- Platforms: 1 side + 1 island platform
- Connections: Bus terminal

Other information
- Station code: OH-25
- Website: Official website

History
- Opened: 1 April 1927; 99 years ago

Passengers
- FY2019: 68,992 daily

Services
Preceding station	Odakyu	Following station
Tamagawagakuen-mae One-way operation	Odawara Line Commuter Semi Express	Kakio towards Yoyogi-Uehara
Tamagawagakuen-mae towards Hon-Atsugi	Odawara Line Semi Express	Kakio towards Yoyogi-Uehara
Tamagawagakuen-mae towards Odawara	Odawara Line Local	Kakio towards Shinjuku or Yoyogi-Uehara
Location
- Location within Tokyo Location within Japan

Tsurukawa Station (鶴川駅, Tsurukawa-eki) is a passenger railway station located in the city of Machida, Tokyo, Japan, operated by the private railway operator Odakyu Electric Railway.

== Lines ==
Tsurukawa Station is served by the 82.5 km Odakyu Odawara Line from Shinjuku in Tokyo to Odawara in Kanagawa Prefecture, and lies 25.1 km (15.6 mi) from the Shinjuku terminus. Some services inter-run to and from Ayase on the Tokyo Metro Chiyoda Line via Yoyogi-Uehara.

== Station layout ==
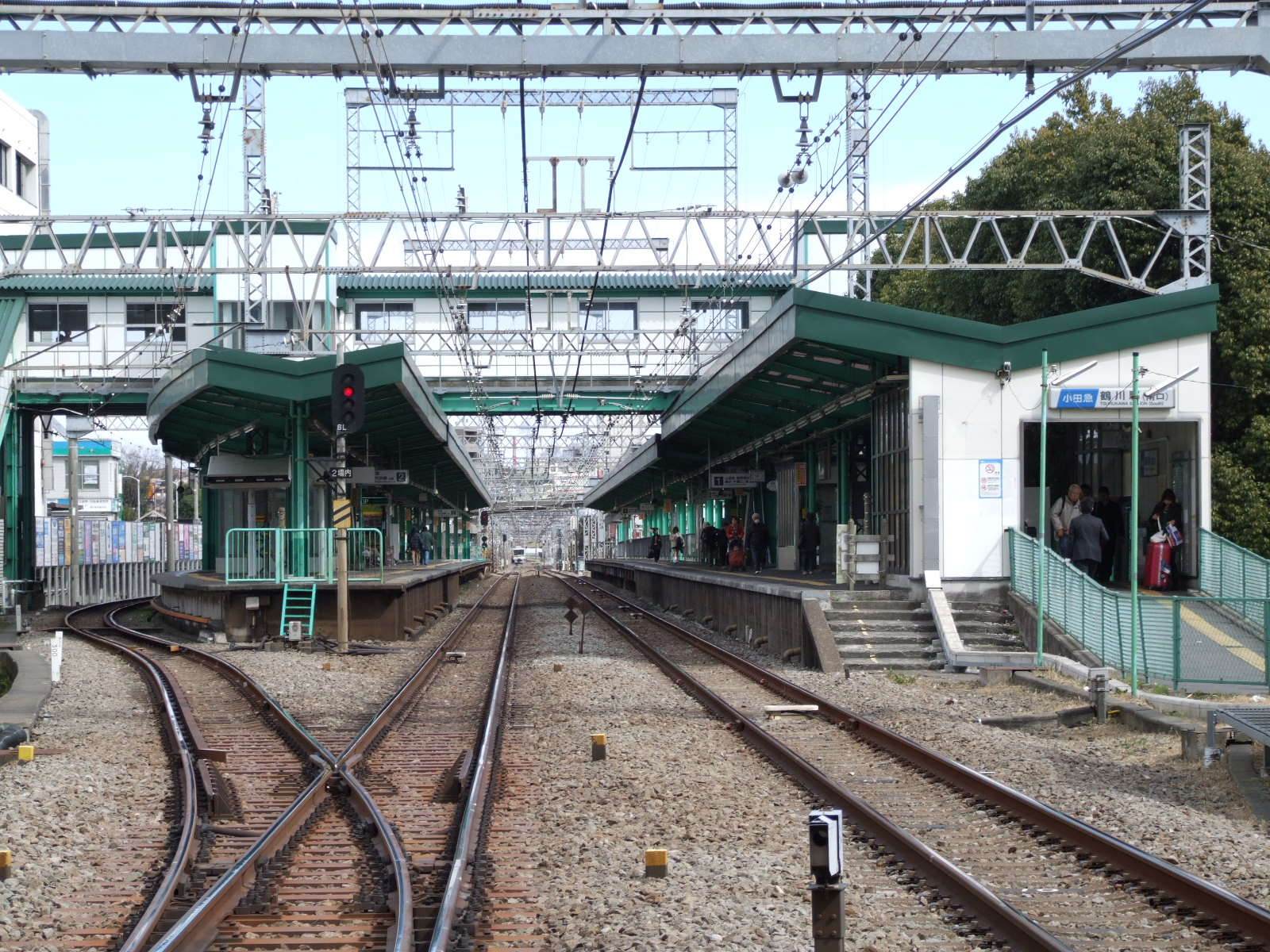
View of the platforms from the west end of the station, March 2008

The station has one side platform and one island platform, serving a total of three tracks, with the platforms connected by a footbridge.

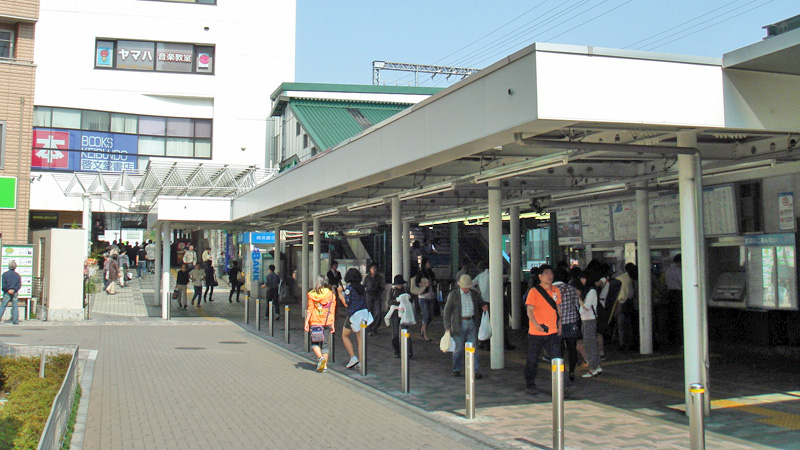
North entrance, May 2010

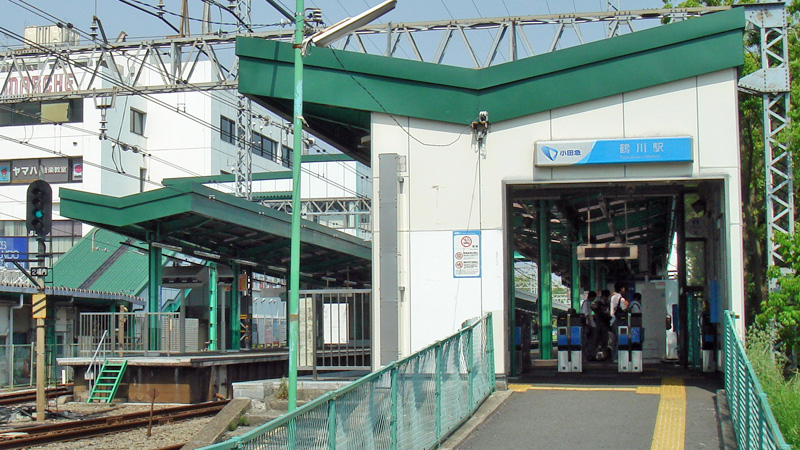
South entrance, May 2010

=== Platforms ===
1	■ Odakyu Odawara Line	for Odawara and Katase-Enoshima
2/3	■ Odakyu Odawara Line	for Shinjuku; Tokyo Metro Chiyoda Line for Ayase

== History ==
The station opened on 1 April 1927.

Station numbering was introduced in January 2014 with Tsurukawa being assigned station number OH25.

== Passenger statistics ==
In fiscal 2019, the station was used by an average of 68,992 passengers daily.

== Surrounding area ==
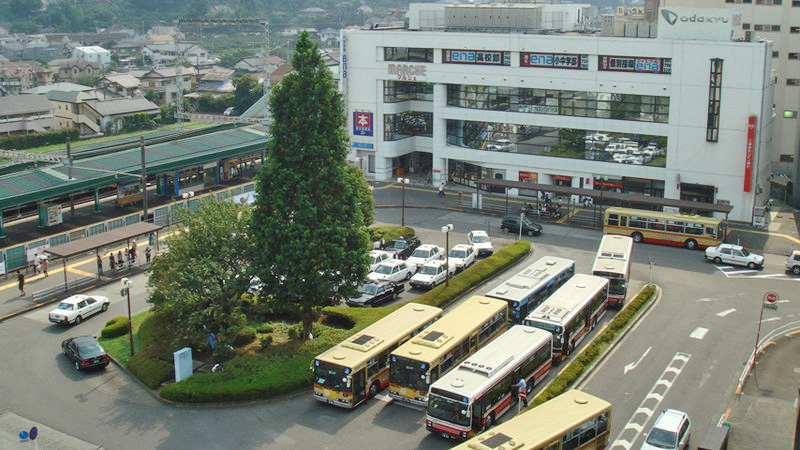
Station forecourt on north side, May 2010

- Wako University
- Kokushikan University (Tsurukawa Campus)
