= Tamagawa University =

University in Machida, Tokyo, Japan

Coordinates: 35°34′01″N 139°28′05″E

- 玉川大学
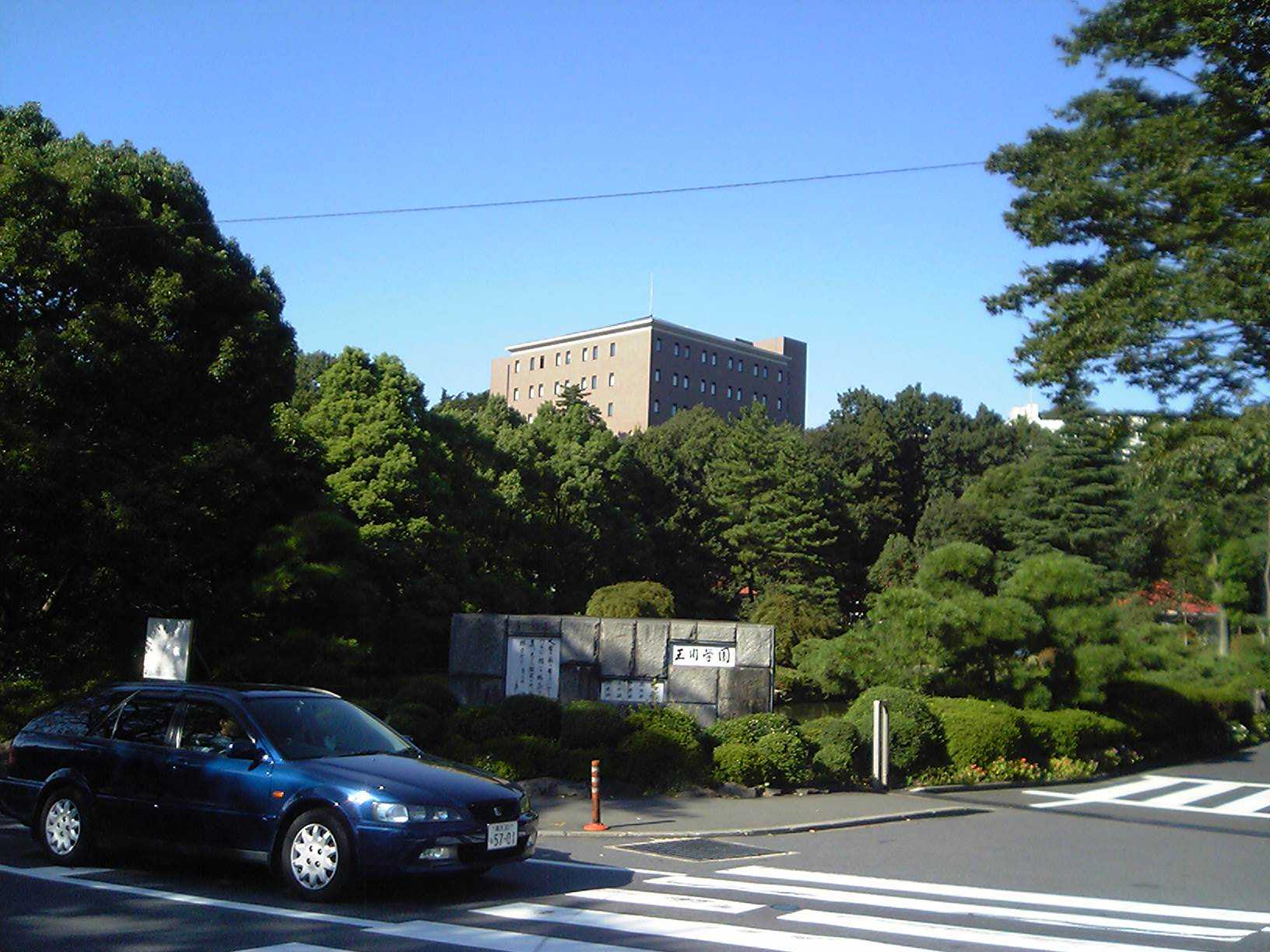
- Type: Private
- Established: 1929
- Endowment: N/A
- President: Yoshiaki Obara
- Location: 6-1-1 Tamagawa Gakuen, Machida, Tokyo, Machida, Tokyo, Japan
- Campus: Urban
- Website: www.tamagawa.jp (engl.)

Tamagawa University (玉川大学, Tamagawa daigaku) is a Japanese university in Machida, Tokyo, Japan. The university consists of 16 departments in seven faculties (undergraduate), as well as seven programs leading to a master's degree and four programs leading to a doctorate degree. Part of the Tamagawa Gakuen campus, the school was founded by Japanese education reformer Kuniyoshi Obara.

== Undergraduate colleges ==
- College of Humanities
- College of Agriculture
- College of Engineering
- College of Business Administration
- College of Education
- College of Arts
- College of Arts and Sciences

== Graduate schools ==
- Graduate School of Humanities
- Graduate School of Agriculture
- Graduate School of Engineering
- Graduate School of Management
- Graduate School of Education
- Graduate School of Education (Teaching profession)
- Graduate School of Brain Sciences

== Notable alumni ==
- Masami Akita
- Yuichiro Hata
- Chen Kenichi
- Masaharu Morimoto
- Shunmyō Masuno
- Sayaka Murata
- Hiroko Yakushimaru
- Yudai Chiba
- Inio Asano
