= Kuniyoshi Obara =

Japanese educator

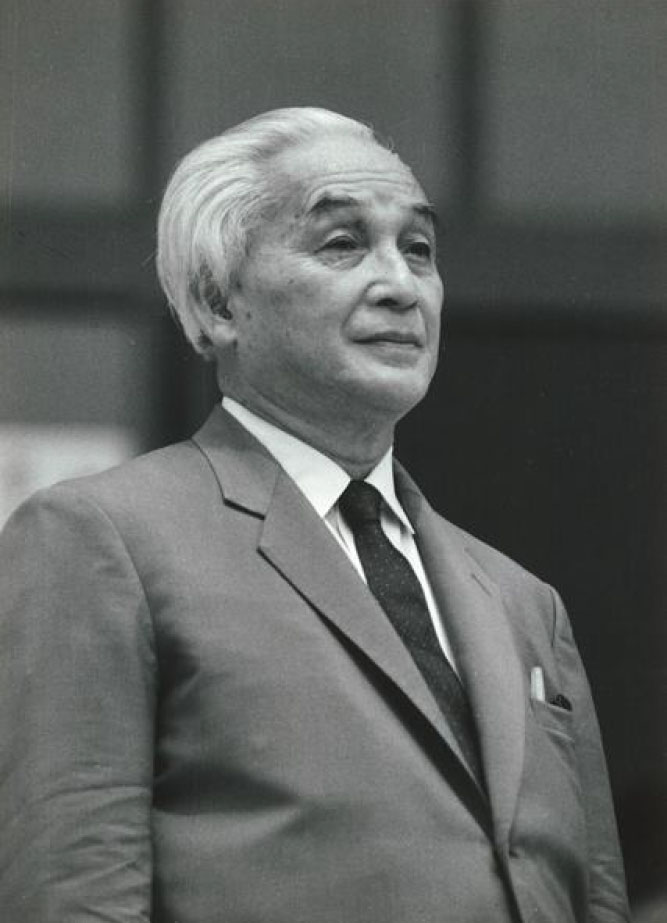

Kuniyoshi Obara (小原 國芳, Obara Kuniyoshi; April 8, 1887 – December 13, 1977) was an influential Japanese education reformer and publisher. Obara left a strong mark in education philosophy and on the theories of liberal education, art education and vocational education. In addition to creating his own education theory, Zenjin (or "Whole Person") Education, he was among the leaders of the New Education Movement in Japan and disseminated in that country the works of earlier reformers such as Johann Heinrich Pestalozzi. He was the founder of the campus Tamagawa Gakuen and for many years president of its university, Tamagawa University.

== Biography ==
=== Personal life ===
Born to a Samurai family on 8 April 1887 in the Kagoshima Prefecture of Japan, in a village called Kushi, Obara was the grandson of a famous educator. He was adopted into the Ajisaka family in his early childhood after the death of his parents.

Obara converted to Christianity in his early adulthood and remained a devout Christian throughout his life. In 1920, he married educator Nobu Takai, who remained his wife until her death six months before his own. In the last months of his life, Obara was diagnosed with disease of the pancreas and hospitalized. He died on 13 December 1977.

=== Education ===
Obara studied at Kagoshima Normal School (now Kagoshima University) and Hiroshima Higher Normal School (now Hiroshima University) before becoming an English teacher at Kagawa Normal School (now Kagawa University) in Shikoku, where he also taught education and psychology. He entered the Kyoto Imperial University in 1915. There, he was influenced by prominent professors in the Kyoto School of philosophy, including Kitaro Nishida and Seiichi Hatano. His first book was published in 1918. Kyôiku no Konpon Mondai to shite no Shûkyô ("Religion as the fundamental problem of education") was a retitling of his bachelor's thesis, Shûkyô ni yoru Kyôiku no Kyûsai ("The salvation of education through religion"), which he had completed the same year.

=== Professional career ===
Following his graduation, Obara became the head of the Department of Educational Affairs of the elementary school at Hiroshima Higher Normal. Already involved with the New Education Movement, Obara became the director of the Seijyo Elementary School in 1919. In 1921, Obara joined seven other education reformists (Choichi Higuchi, Kiyomaru Kohno, Kishie Tezuka, Kinshichi Inage, Meikichi Chiba, Heiji Oikawa and Noburu Katakami) in the "Eight Educators Educational Advocacy Conference".

Here he devised his "Zenjin (Whole Person) Education" philosophy. Influenced by Plato, Erasmus and Swiss education reformer Johann Heinrich Pestalozzi, this philosophy promoted a balanced and individualized approach to the development of the student in the six aspects of truth (veritas; academic ideals), goodness (bonum; moral education), beauty (pulchritudo; art education), holiness (sanctitas; religious education), health (sanitas; physical education), and wealth (copia; vocational education). Obara prioritized the first four of these aspects, which he considered "absolute values", over the final two, which "instrumental values" were necessary to help achieve the first four but not intrinsically valuable.

In the 1920s, Obara founded three schools — a junior high school (1922), a kindergarten (1925), and a senior high school (1926) — moving all the schools to create the "Seijyo Gakuen" comprehensive campus in Kinuta. In 1929, wanting a school that would fundamentally embody his personal education philosophies, Obara decided to create a new complex, Tamagawa Gakuen. Beginning with the elementary school, he gradually built up the campus through the university level. Once his multi-generation campus was completed, he opened additional Tamagawa Gakuen in Japan, the United States, and Canada, with campuses in Los Angeles (1930), Kugenuma (1933), Kushi (1948), and Nanaimo (1976). The Tamagawa Gakuen became famous in Japan for its innovative approach to education.

Throughout this period, Obara also worked as a publisher, a profession he undertook in 1923 with the founding of his Idea Shoin Press, which was later renamed Tamagawa University Press. In 1928, Obara published The Complete Works of Pestalozzi, popularizing the works of the Swiss reformer in Japan. In the early 1930s, he published a 30-volume encyclopedia for Japanese children, the first such encyclopedia in the nation.

From 1967 to 1974, Obara became president of the Japanese section of the UNESCO World Education Fellowship. Throughout his later life, Obara was a frequent lecturer.

His works have been collected in 48 volumes.

== Influence ==
Obara was highly influential in Japanese education in several areas. In his early work, he helped popularize and spread the New Education Movement in Japan. He helped revive Japanese arts education, in significant part a response to his introduction of "school drama" to the elementary studies at Hiroshima Normal. But his greatest contribution was perhaps his theory on "Zenjin Education." Even after the New Education Movement faded in Japan, a result of the rise of militaristic nationalism after the Great Depression, the "Zenjin Education" philosophy retained its influence. Since the early 1970s, it has been part of the Japanese Ministry of Education's general guidelines.

From the publication of his first book, Obara's work was underscored by his belief that all education should derive from religious education, without which he feared academic education would fail to fully develop the student. Though Obara was a Christian, his religious instruction drew on a variety of religious and moral traditions. He took an equally global view to other elements of education, believing that international education was an important aspect of world peace. He invited a wide variety of international educators to visit his Tamagawa Gakuen campuses.

Kuniyoshi Obara believed that there are six areas of human culture: academics, morality, art, religion, the body and livelihood. He called them ‘cultural values.’ He was of the view that the ideal of academics is truth; the ideal of morality is goodness; the ideal of art is beauty; the ideal of religion is holiness; the ideal of the body is health; and the ideal of livelihood is wealth. He strongly believed that the ideal of education is the harmonious development of all these six values. There are institutions and people not just in Japan but worldwide where 'Zenjin' philosophy is followed. A school in India, Wisdom World School Kurukshetra, has mentioned that the educational idea in the 'Zenjin Philosophy' has been their philosophy. The Japanese word ‘Zenjin’ means ‘whole man’ or ‘whole person.’ Thus his theory is often called ‘whole man education’ or ‘whole person education.’

== Honors ==
Obara was internationally honored for his work, receiving among other recognition the Royal Order of Commander of the Dannebrog, Knight, bestowed during his 1975 visit to Denmark with his wife. A paper on Obara has been on the UNESCO site and presents a detailed account of the ideas and aspects he has talked about.
