= Kunihiko Hashida =

Japanese physician

- 橋田 邦彦
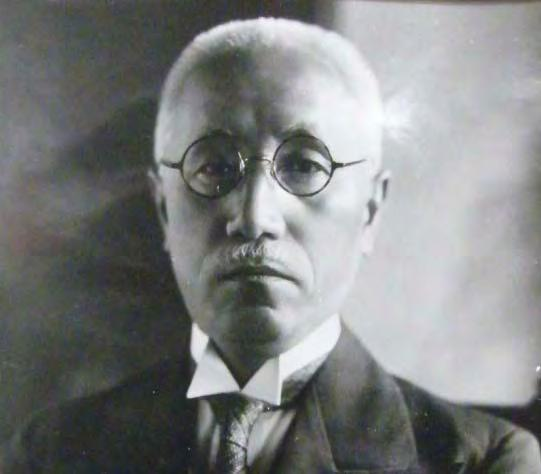

Minister of Education
- In office 22 July 1940 – 20 April 1943
- Prime Minister: Fumimaro Konoe; Hideki Tojo
- Preceded by: Shigejirō Matsuura
- Succeeded by: Hideki Tojo

Personal details
- Born: 15 March 1882 Tottori City, Tottori, Japan
- Died: 14 September 1945 (aged 63) Ogikubo, Tokyo, Japan
- Education: Tokyo Imperial University

Kunihiko Hashida (橋田 邦彦, Hashida Kunihiko; 15 March 1882 – 14 September 1945) was a Japanese physician and physiologist.

Hashida was born in Tottori in 1882. He became a medical professor of Tokyo Imperial University. He also became the Headmaster of the First Higher School in 1937.

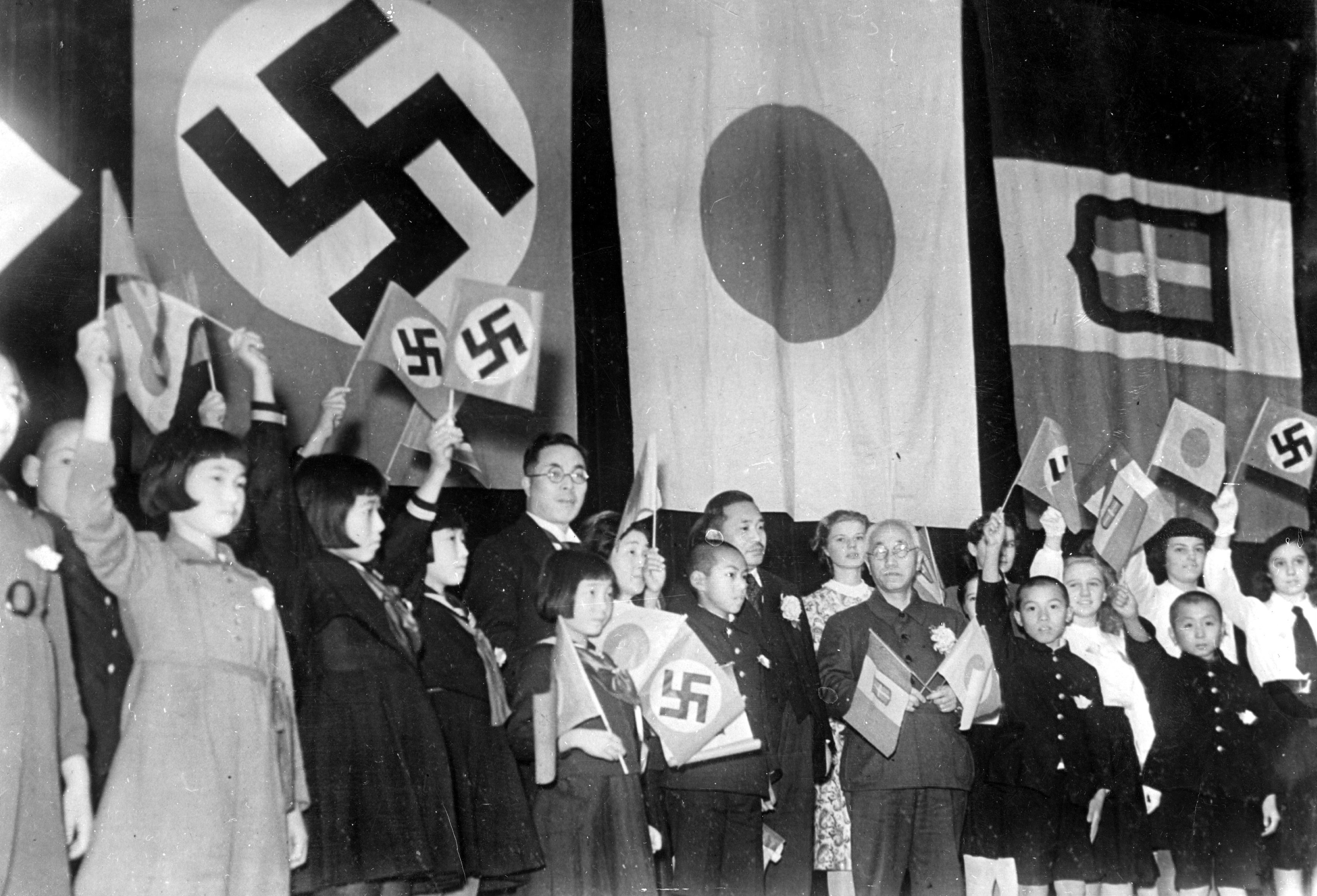
Hashida (on the right) among German, Italian and Japanese children spoke of the Tripartite Pact.

He served as the Minister of Education from 1940 to 1943 under the Konoe and Tōjō cabinets. After World War II, Hashida came under suspicion of war crimes committed during his tenure as minister during the war. Hashida denied wrongdoing and committed suicide by taking potassium cyanide.
