= Tamagawa Gakuen =

Coordinates: 35°34′10″N 139°28′03″E

Tamagawa Gakuen (学校法人玉川学園) is a school in Machida, Tokyo, Japan, covering education from primary school to university. The school was founded by influential Japanese education reformer, Kuniyoshi Obara. The school is a member of the Round Square network of schools.

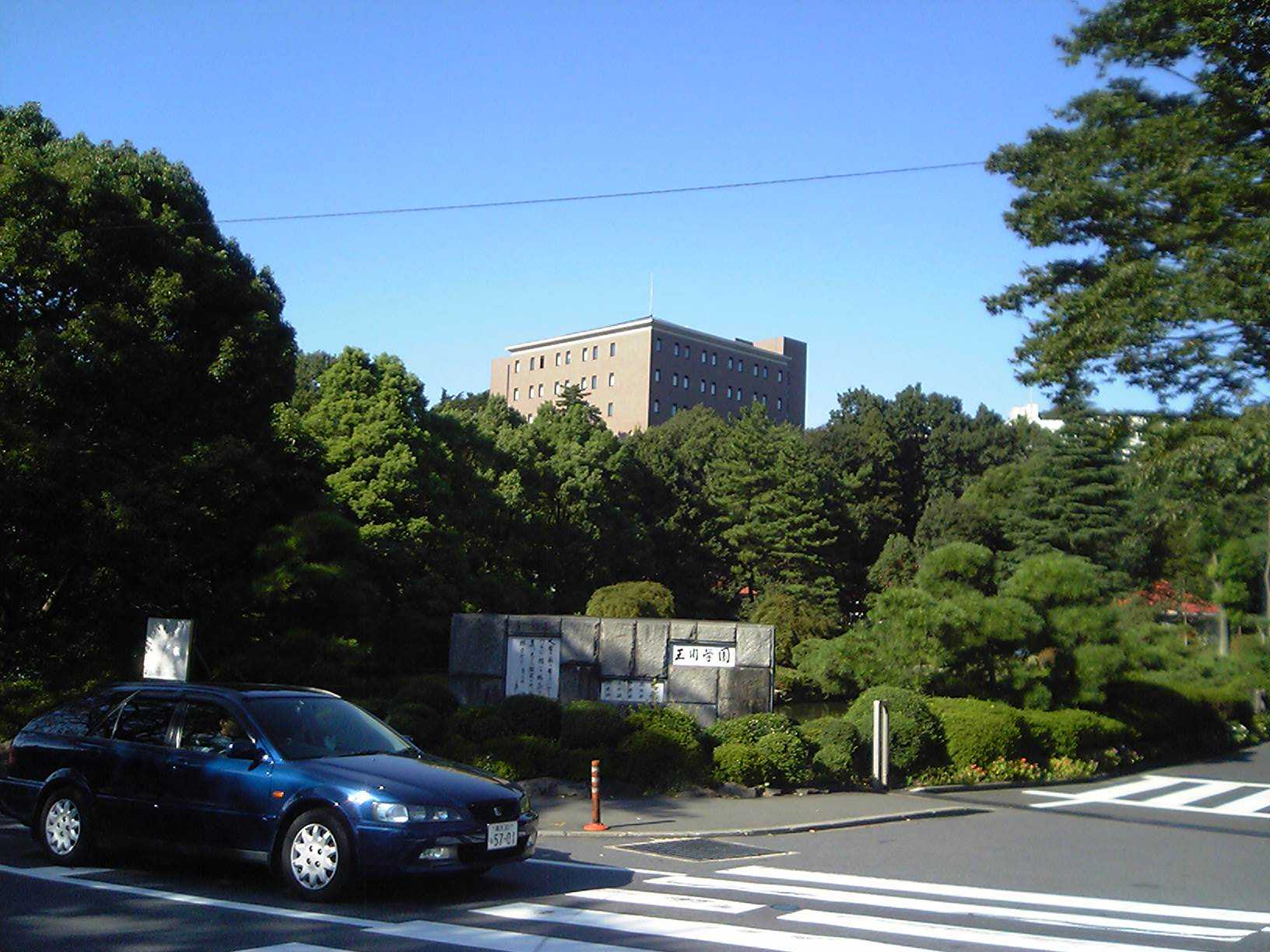
Tamagawa Gakuen
