= Keio Rail-Land =

Coordinates: 35°38′56.72″N 139°24′16.51″E

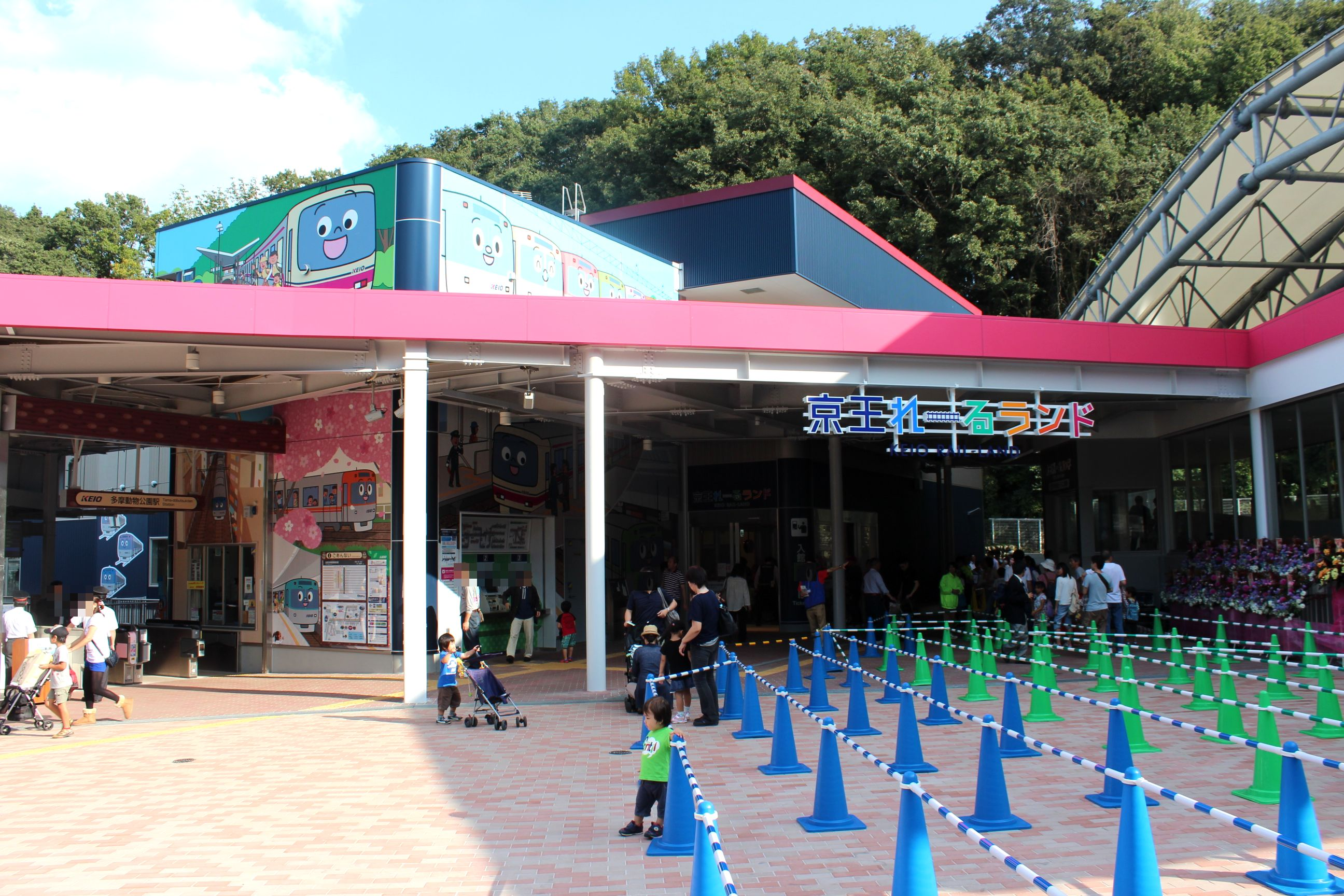
- Entrance, October 2013
- Established: March 2000
- Location: Hino, Tokyo, Japan
- Type: Railway museum
- Public transit access: Tama-Dōbutsukōen Station
- Website: www.keio-rail-land.jp

Keio Rail-Land (京王れーるランド, Keiō Rēru Rando) is a railway museum located next to Tama-Dōbutsukōen Station on the Keio Dōbutsuen Line in Hino, Tokyo, Japan. It is operated by the private railway operator Keio Corporation. Originally opening in March 2000, the museum was refurbished and expanded with a new outdoor exhibition area in 2013, re-opening on 10 October to mark the 100th anniversary of Keio.

== Exhibits ==
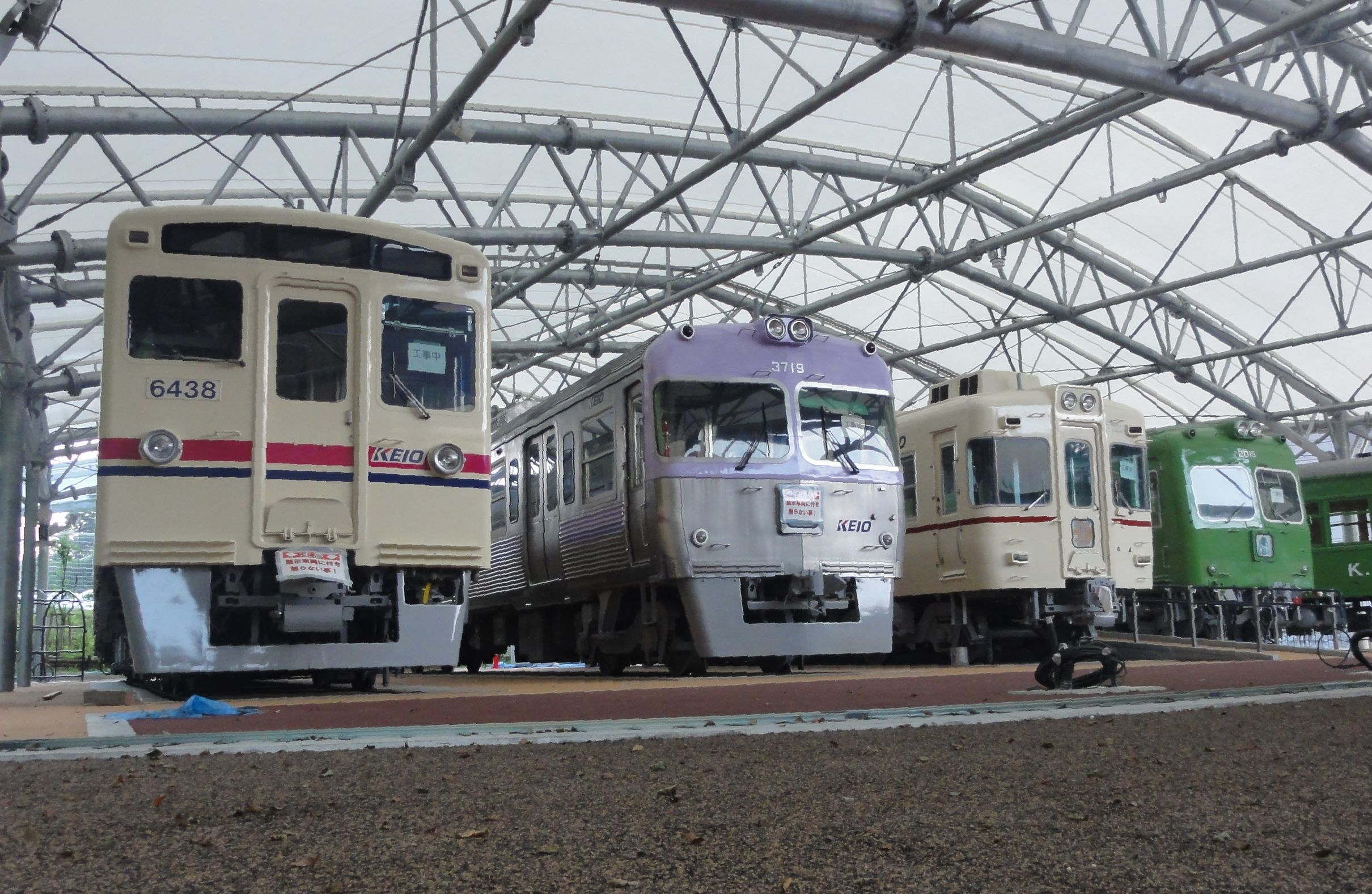
The outdoor exhibits before opening, August 2013

The outdoor exhibition area houses the following five former Keio EMU cars.

- Keio 6000 series car DeHa 6438
- Keio 3000 series car KuHa 3719
- Keio 5000 series car KuHa 5723
- Keio 2010 series car DeHa 2015
- Keio 2400 series car DeHa 2410

=== Individual rolling stock histories ===
==== DeHa 6438 ====
First appearing in 1972, the 6000 series was the first rolling stock operated by Keio with 20 m long carriages and four pairs of doors per side. DeHa 6438 was built in March 1989 by Tokyu Car, initially numbered 6420, as part of a 2-car set for use on overground services. It was modified for subway-inter-running operations in 1993, and renumbered 6438. It was withdrawn in June 2009.

==== KuHa 3719 ====
First appearing in 1962 on the Keio Inokashira Line, the 3000 series was the first Keio rolling stock to use completely stainless steel body construction. KuHa 3719 was built in 1979 by Tokyo Car, and was withdrawn in March 2009.

==== KuHa 5723 ====
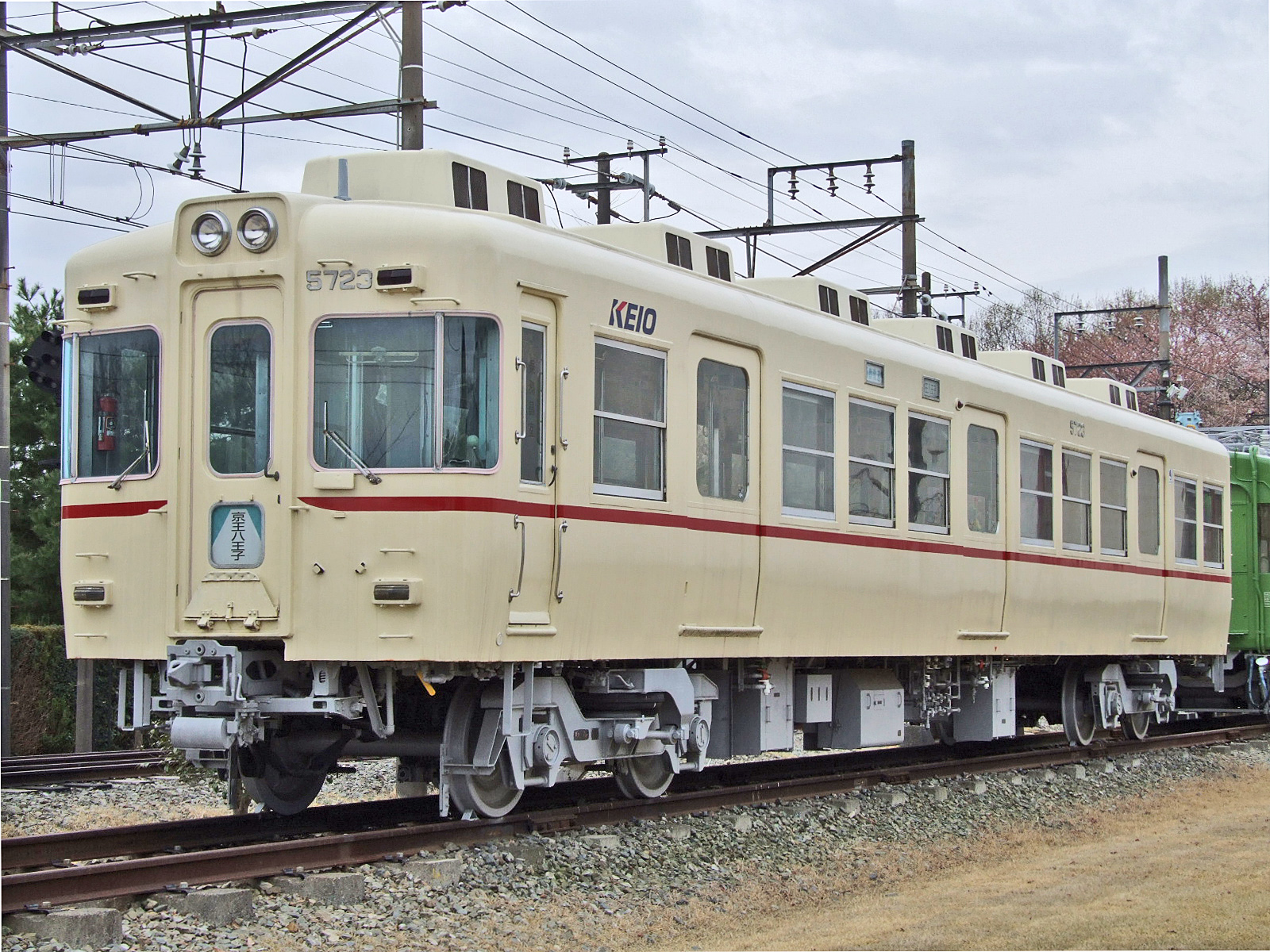
KuHa 5723 in 2009

The 5000 series was the first Japanese commuter rolling stock to feature air conditioning. KuHa 5723 was built in 1969 by Tokyu Car, and was withdrawn in December 1996.

==== DeHa 2015 ====
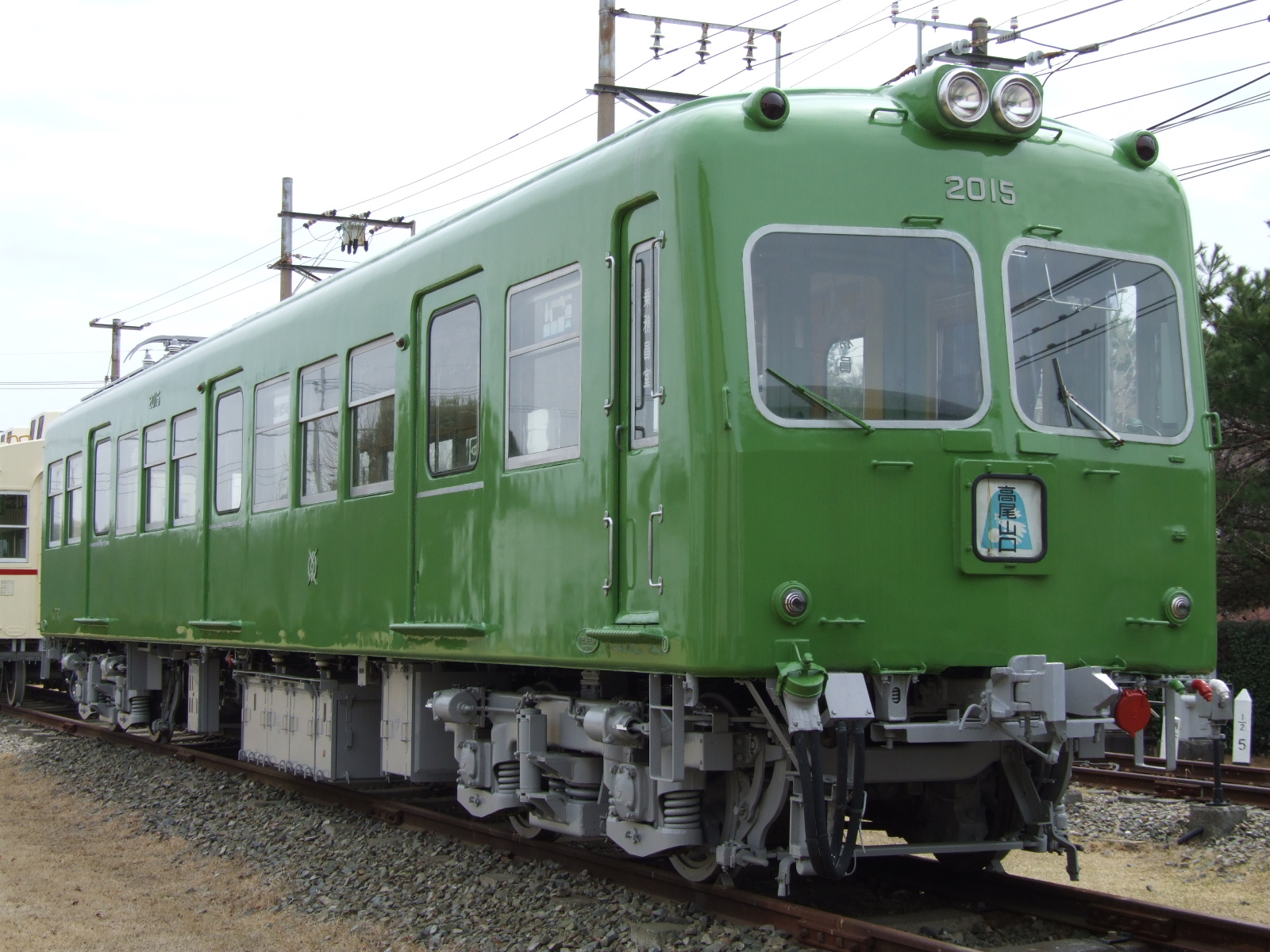
DeHa 2015 in April 2003

DeHa 2015 was built in 1961 by Hitachi, and was withdrawn in November 1984. Initially stored at Keio's Aobadai Works, it was moved to the Keio Heritage Centre in 1998.

==== DeHa 2410 ====
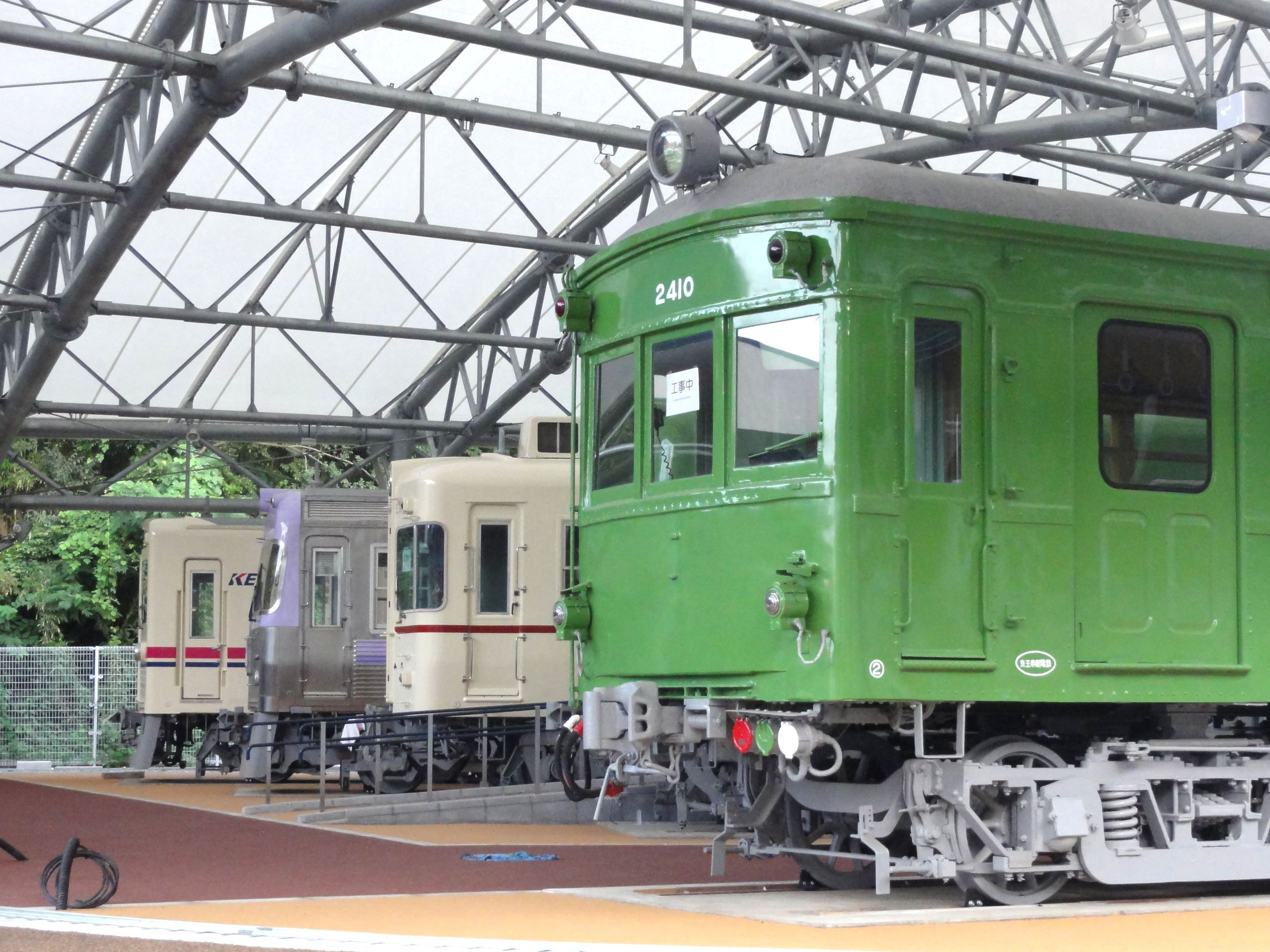
DeHa 2410 (nearest camera) in August 2013

DeHa 2410 was built in 1940 by Nippon Sharyo as KuHa 410. It was rebuilt in 1942 as a single-car motored unit with cabs at both ends, numbered DeHa 410. After World War II, it was again rebuilt as a motor unit with one cab, and renumbered DeHa 2410. In 1963, it was further rebuilt with the addition of a driver's cab door, becoming DeHa 222. It was withdrawn in September 1969, and was preserved near Tama-Dōbutsukōen Station from 1972. It was moved to the Keio Heritage Centre in 1998.

== Access ==
Keio Rail-Land is located adjacent to Tama-Dōbutsukōen Station on the Keio Dōbutsuen Line and the Tama Toshi Monorail Line. Admission is 310 yen.
