= Tama Zoological Park =

Tama Zoo
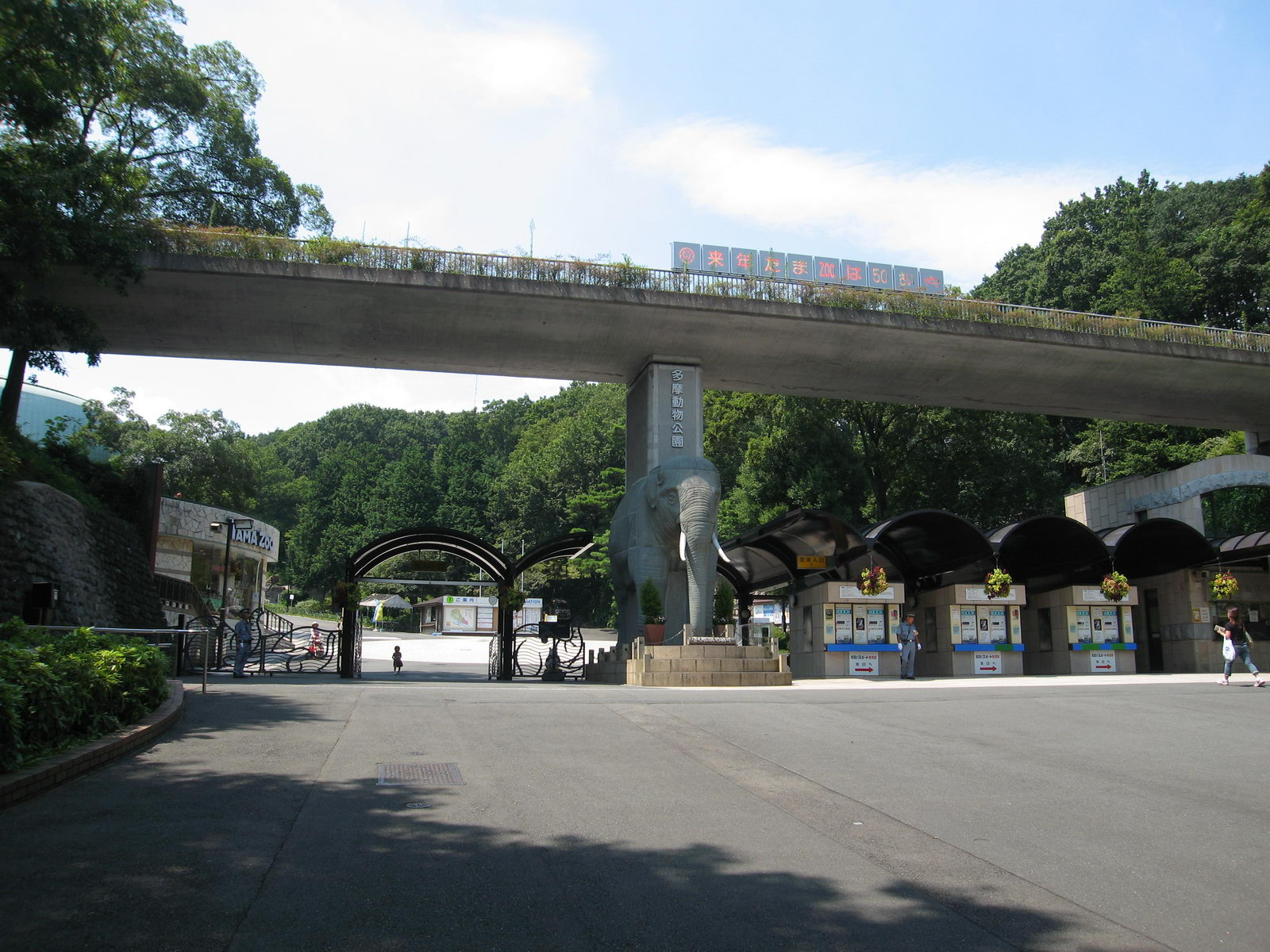
- The zoo's entrance
- Interactive map of Tama Zoo
- 35°39′N 139°24′E
- Date opened: May 5, 1958; 68 years ago
- Location: Hino, Tokyo, Japan
- Land area: 52 ha (130 acres)
- Memberships: JAZA
- Website: https://www.tokyo-zoo.net/zoo/tama/, https://www.tokyo-zoo.net/english/tama/, https://www.tokyo-zoo.net/chinese/tama/, https://www.tokyo-zoo.net/korean/tama/

The Tama Zoological Park (多摩動物公園, Tama Dōbutsukōen; Tama Zoo for short) is a zoo, owned by the government of Tokyo Metropolis, and located in Hino, Tokyo, Japan. The Tama Zoo was opened on May 5, 1958, originally as a branch (分園; satellite facility) of the Ueno Zoo. The zoo aims to use its large site – 52 ha, compared to the 14.3 ha of the Ueno Zoo – to show its animals moving in a more free and natural environment.

== Animals ==
Animals in the zoo include:

Asian Zone

- African spoonbill
- American white ibis
- Amur tiger
- Asian elephant
- Bar-headed goose
- Black stork
- Black-faced spoonbill
- Black-headed ibis
- Blue-and-yellow macaw
- Bornean orangutan
- Brant
- Cackling goose
- Chinese bamboo partridge
- Common shelduck
- Common wolf
- Crested ibis
- Domestic water buffalo
- Edwards's pheasant
- Eurasian eagle-owl
- Golden eagle
- Golden takin
- Greater white-fronted goose
- Greylag goose
- Guinea pig
- Himalayan monal
- Himalayan tahr
- Hokkaido horse
- Inca tern
- Indian peafowl
- Indian rhinoceros
- Japanese black bear
- Japanese giant flying squirrel
- Japanese grass vole
- Japanese hare
- Japanese macaque
- Japanese pipistrelle
- Japanese raccoon dog
- Japanese scops owl
- Japanese serow
- Japanese wood pigeon
- Large Japanese field mouse
- Lesser white-fronted goose
- Malayan tapir
- Mandarin duck
- Masked palm civet
- Mouflon
- Mountain hare
- Mountain hawk-eagle
- Northern bald ibis
- Oriental small-clawed otter
- Oriental stork
- Palawan peacock-pheasant
- Père David's deer
- Pheasant pigeon
- Przewalski's horse
- Puna ibis
- Red junglefowl
- Red panda
- Red-and-green macaw
- Red-crowned crane
- Reindeer
- Scarlet ibis
- Siberian crane
- Small Japanese field mouse
- Snow goose
- Snow leopard
- Snowy owl
- Steller's sea eagle
- Straw-necked ibis
- Swan goose
- Tundra bean goose
- White-handed gibbon
- White-naped crane
- White-tailed eagle
- Ural owl

Mole House

A man-made mole burrow made of glass-covered earth and metal tunnels.

- Eurasian least shrew
- Japanese mole
- Long-clawed shrew
- Small Japanese mole

African Zone

- African bush elephant
- Cape teal
- Cheetah
- Chimpanzee
- Giraffe
- Great white pelican
- Greater flamingo
- Grévy's zebra
- Lion
- Scimitar oryx
- Serval

Australian Zone

- Brush-tailed rat-kangaroo
- Common brushtail possum
- Common wallaroo
- Emu
- Koala
- Laughing kookaburra
- Parma wallaby
- Red kangaroo
- Sugar glider
- Tasmanian devil
- Tawny frogmouth
- Yellow-footed rock wallaby

Insectarium

- Diving beetle
- Eiffinger's frog
- Forest green tree frog
- Genji firefly
- Giant leaf insect
- Giant water bug
- Glowworm
- Heike firefly
- Japanese common toad
- Japanese fire-bellied newt
- Japanese rhinoceros beetle
- Leafcutter ant
- Migratory locust
- Montane brown frog
- Ogasawara land snail
- Sakishima grass lizard
- Sakishima tree lizard
- Schlegel's green tree frog
- Tokyo salamander
- Tree nymph

=== Anura ===
Anura (Japanese: アヌーラ) is a male Asian elephant at the Tama Zoo. As of 2025, he is 72 years old and the oldest elephant living in Japan. Anura was born in 1953 in the Dominion of Ceylon and imported to Japan in 1956. He originally lived at Ueno Zoo and was moved to Tama Zoo in 1958. Anura was named after Anura Bandaranaike, the son of Ceylon's then-prime minister Sirimavo Bandaranaike.

== Access ==
Tama-Dōbutsukōen Station on the Keiō Dōbutsuen Line and the Tama Toshi Monorail Line is in front of the park's gate.

== In popular culture ==
Tama Zoological Park is featured heavily in the manga and anime series My Deer Friend Nokotan, where it is referred to as "Hino Zoo". It also appeared in the original Kamen Rider, as a location of the week
