= Keio 7000 series =

Japanese train type

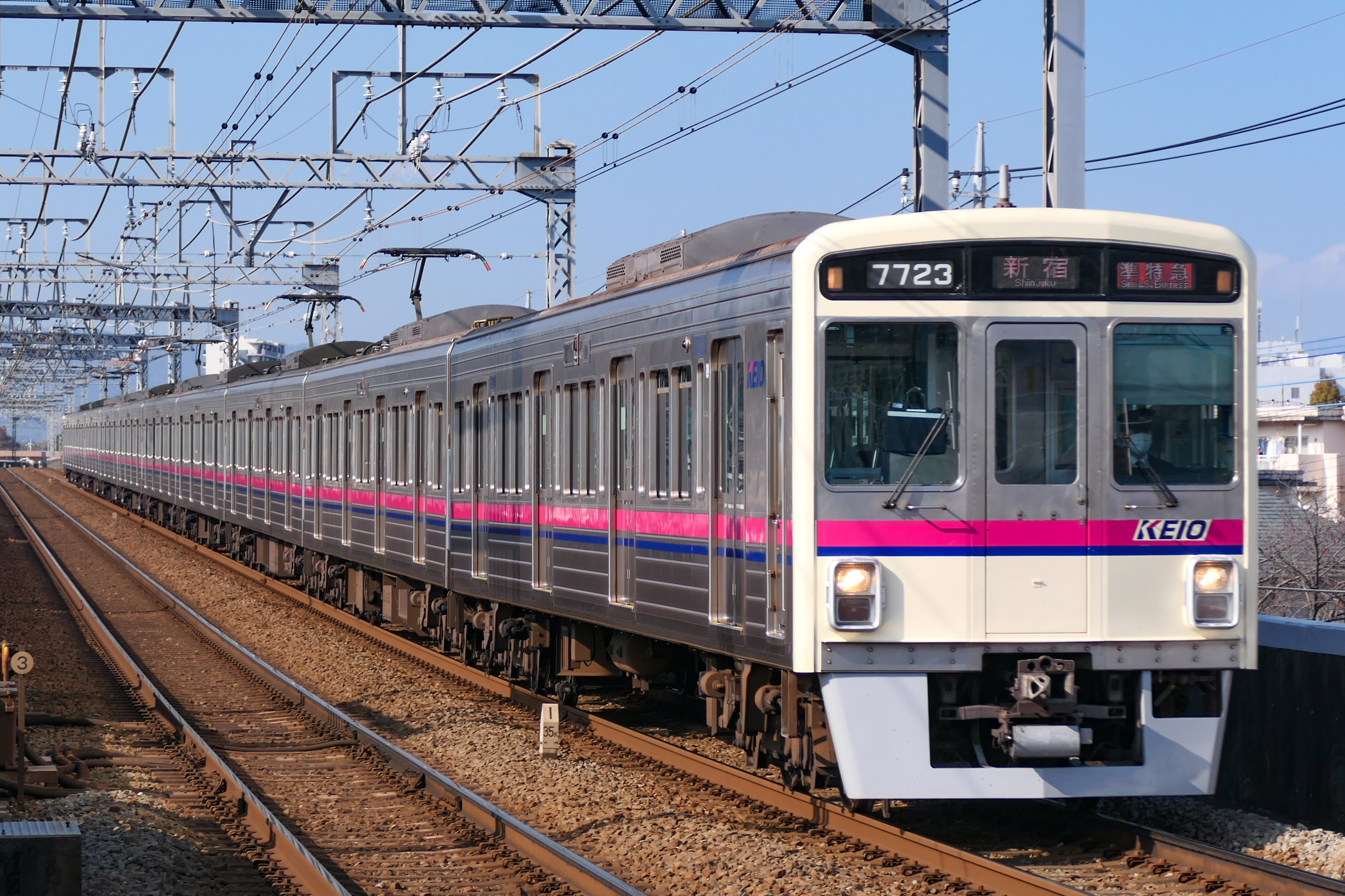
- 10-car 7000 series set 7723 in November 2021
- Manufacturers: Nippon Sharyo, Tokyu Car Corporation
- Constructed: 1984–1996
- Entered service: 9 March 1984
- Number built: 190 vehicles
- Number in service: 160 vehicles
- Number scrapped: 30 vehicles
- Formation: 2/4/6/10 cars per trainset 8 cars per trainset (former)
- Fleet numbers: 7701–7708 6-car sets 7721–7728 10-car sets 7801–7807 4-car sets 7421–7425 2-car sets
- Operator: Keio Corporation

Specifications
- Car body construction: Stainless steel
- Car length: 20 m (65 ft 7 in)
- Doors: 4 pairs per side
- Maximum speed: 110 km/h (68 mph)
- Acceleration: 2.5 km/(h⋅s) (1.6 mph/s)
- Deceleration: 4.0 km/(h⋅s) (2.5 mph/s); 4.5 km/(h⋅s) (2.8 mph/s) (emergency)
- Electric systems: 1,500 V DC (overhead catenary)
- Current collection: Pantograph
- Multiple working: 9000 series, 6000 series
- Track gauge: 1,372 mm (4 ft 6 in)

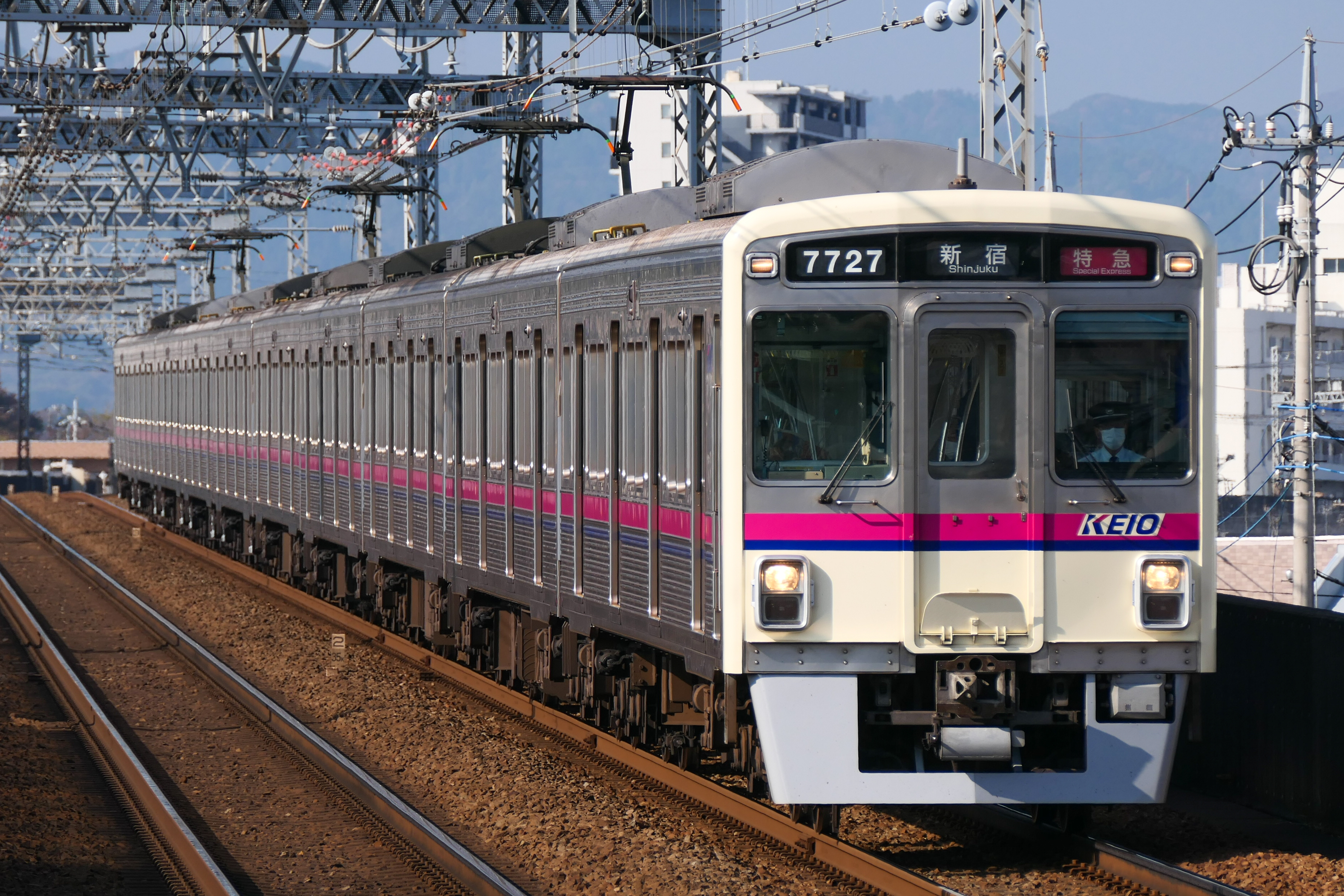
8-car set 7727

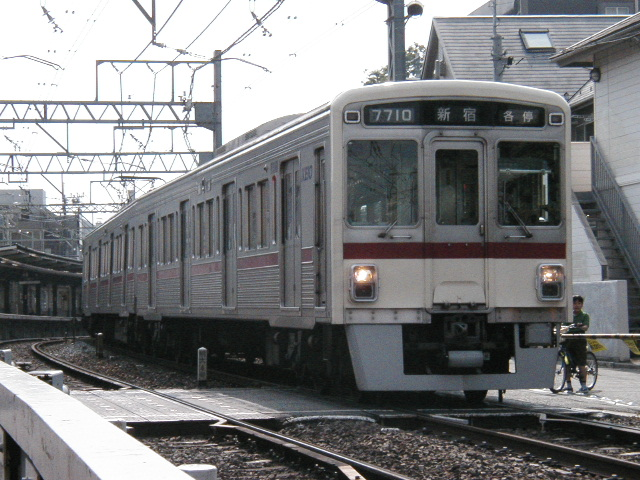
Set 7710 in pre-2002 color scheme

The Keio 7000 series (京王7000系) is a Japanese electric multiple unit (EMU) commuter train type operated by the private railway operator Keio Corporation on commuter services in the western suburbs of Tokyo.

== Technical details ==
- Control system
  - Refurbished: IGBT-VVVF
  - 10-car sets (6 motored cars): Chopper
  - 10-car sets (5 motored cars): VVVF
  - 8-car sets (5 motored cars): Chopper
  - 8-car sets (4 motored cars): VVVF
  - 6-car sets (4 motored cars): Chopper
  - 6-car sets (3 motored cars): VVVF
  - 4-car sets (2 motored cars): Chopper
  - 2-car sets (1 motored car): Chopper
- Motor output: 150 kW (200 hp)
- Drive mechanism: Parallel cardan shaft
- Headlights: Sealed beam
- Destination indicators: roller blind

=== Body ===
The body is made up of stainless steel. Earlier sets used a more corrugated design than that of sets made after 1987, and their end types were minimally different. Some corrugated-style cars were made after 1987 as middle cars for sets made early in production. The sides were not painted. Fronts of early sets were the same color as the sides.

=== Driver's cab ===
The driver's cab contains a T-shaped, one-handle master-controller system. The speedometer is analog, providing information up to 140 km/h (87 mph).

- Acceleration: 4 notch
- Deceleration: 7 notch + emergency
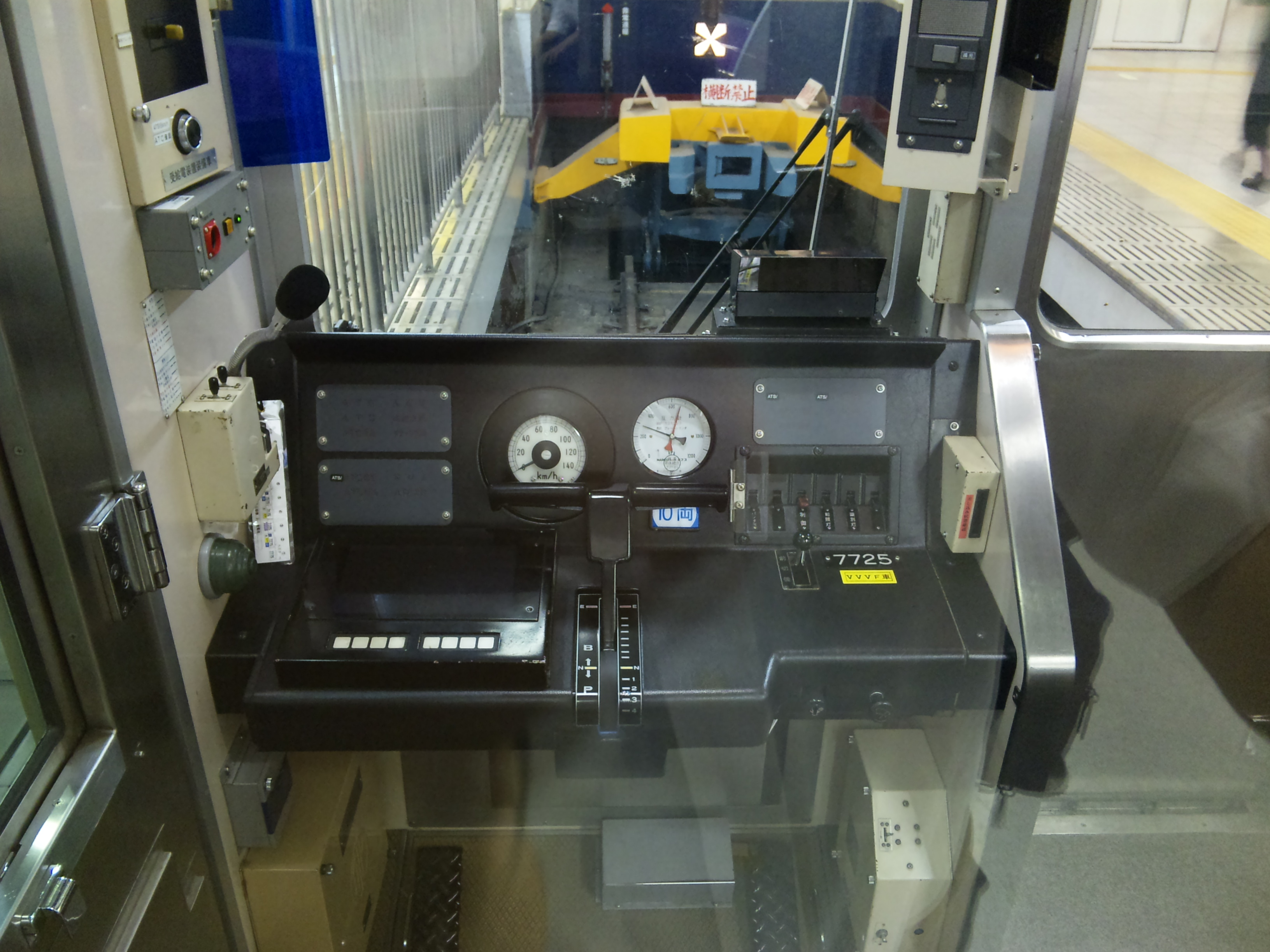
Driver's cab

== Formations ==
=== Current formations ===
==== 6-car formations ====
Sets are formed as follows:

	← Shinjuku Keio-hachioji →					
Designation	Tc1	M1	T	M1	M2	Tc2
Capacity (total)	150	170	170	170	170	150
Numbering	7701 : 7705	7001 : 7005	7551 : 7555	7101 : 7105	7151 : 7155	7751 : 7755

==== 10-car formations ====
Sets are formed as follows:

	← Shinjuku Keio-hachioji →									
Designation	Tc1	M1	M2	T1	M1	T2	T2	M1	M2	Tc2
Capacity (total)	150	170	170	170	170	170	170	170	170	150
Numbering	7721 : 7729	7021 : 7029	7071 : 7079	7521 : 7529	7121 : 7129	7571 : 7579	7671 : 7679	7221 : 7229	7271 : 7279	7771 : 7779

- Set 7729 was scrapped in February 2020.

==== 4-car formations ====
Sets are formed as follows:

	← Shinjuku Keio-hachioji →			
Designation	Tc1	M1	M2	Tc2
Capacity (total)	150	170	170	150
Numbering	7801 : 7807	7201 : 7207	7251 : 7257	7851 : 7857

- Sets 7801 and 7802 are equipped with "Wanman" one-person operation on the Dōbutsuen Line.

==== 2-car formations ====
Sets are formed as follows:

	← Shinjuku Keio-hachioji →	
Designation	Mc	Tc
Capacity (total)	150	150
Numbering	7421 : 7425	7871 : 7875

=== Past formations ===
==== 8-car formations ====
Sets were formed as follows:

	← Shinjuku Keio-hachioji →							
Designation	Tc1	M1	M2	T1	T2	M1	M2	Tc2
Capacity (total)	150	170	170	170	170	170	170	150
Numbering	7706 : 7709	7006 : 7009	7056 : 7059	7506 : 7509	7556 : 7559	7106 : 7109	7156 : 7159	7756 : 7759

- Sets 7708 and 7709 had their "T1" and "T2" cars scrapped and were shortened to 6-car trains in November 2017.
- Sets 7706 and 7707 were scrapped due to the arrival of the 5000 series.

== Interior ==
Seating consists of longitudinal bench seats, arranged 4-7-7-7-4 in intermediate cars. Original sets have no passenger information displays, but refurbished sets feature 3-color LED information displays (four per car).

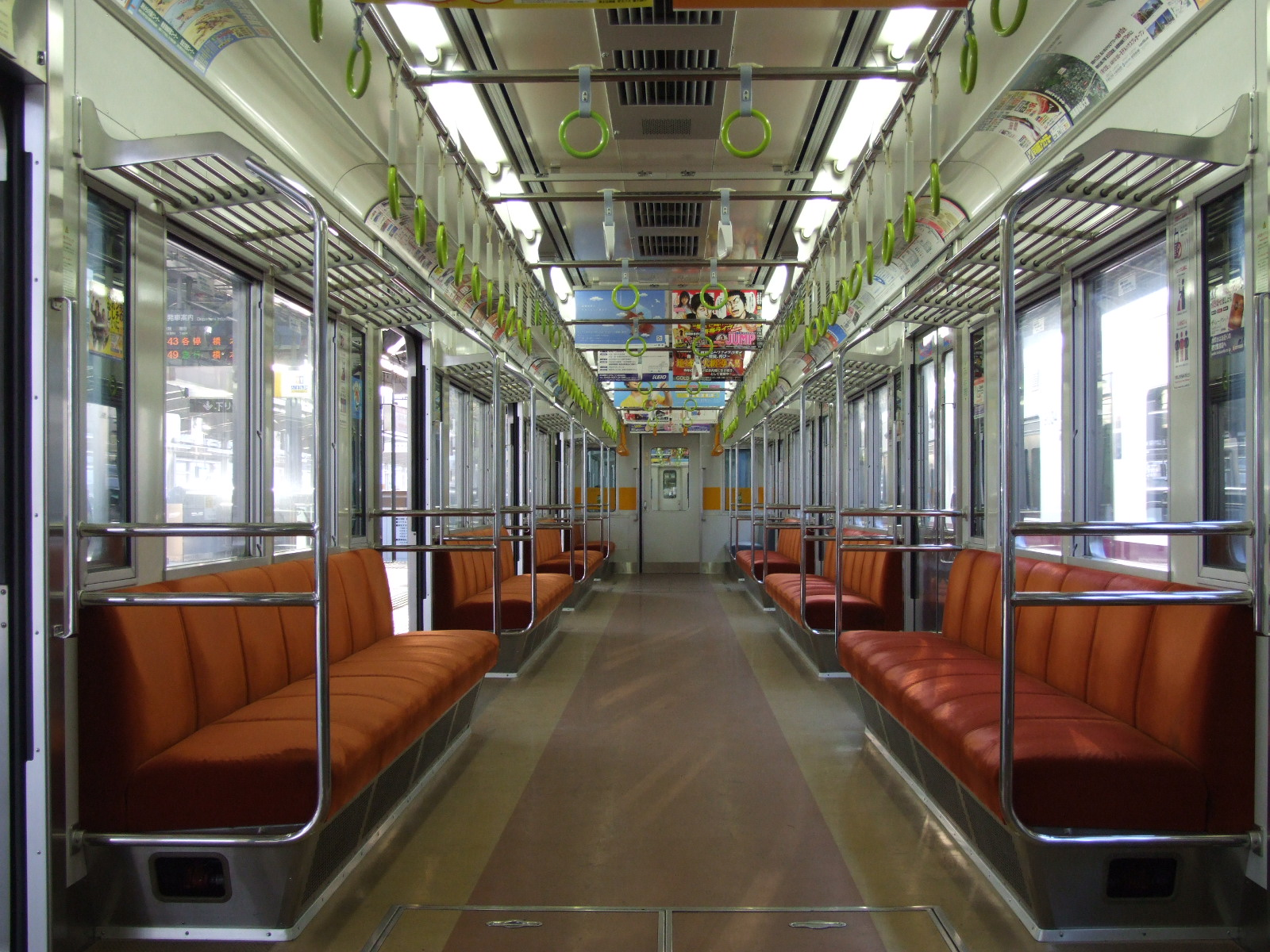
Interior of car in original condition

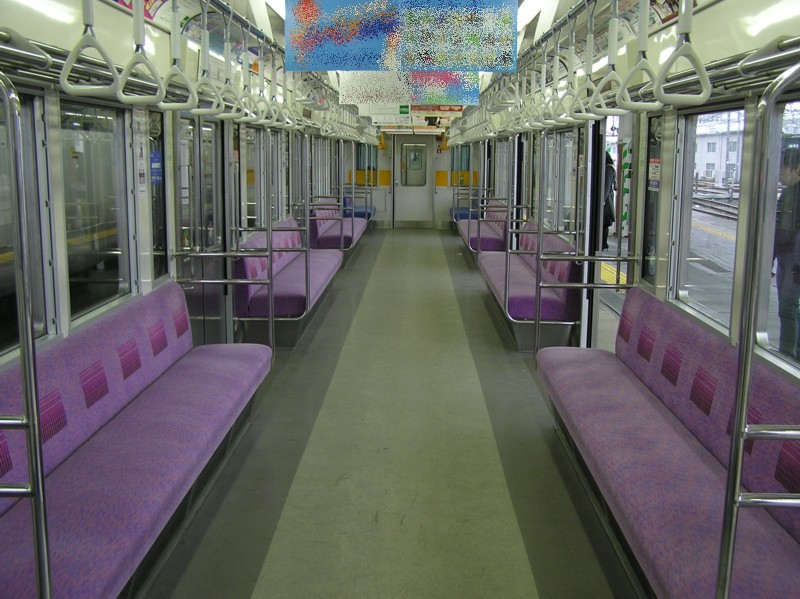
Inside of a refurbished car

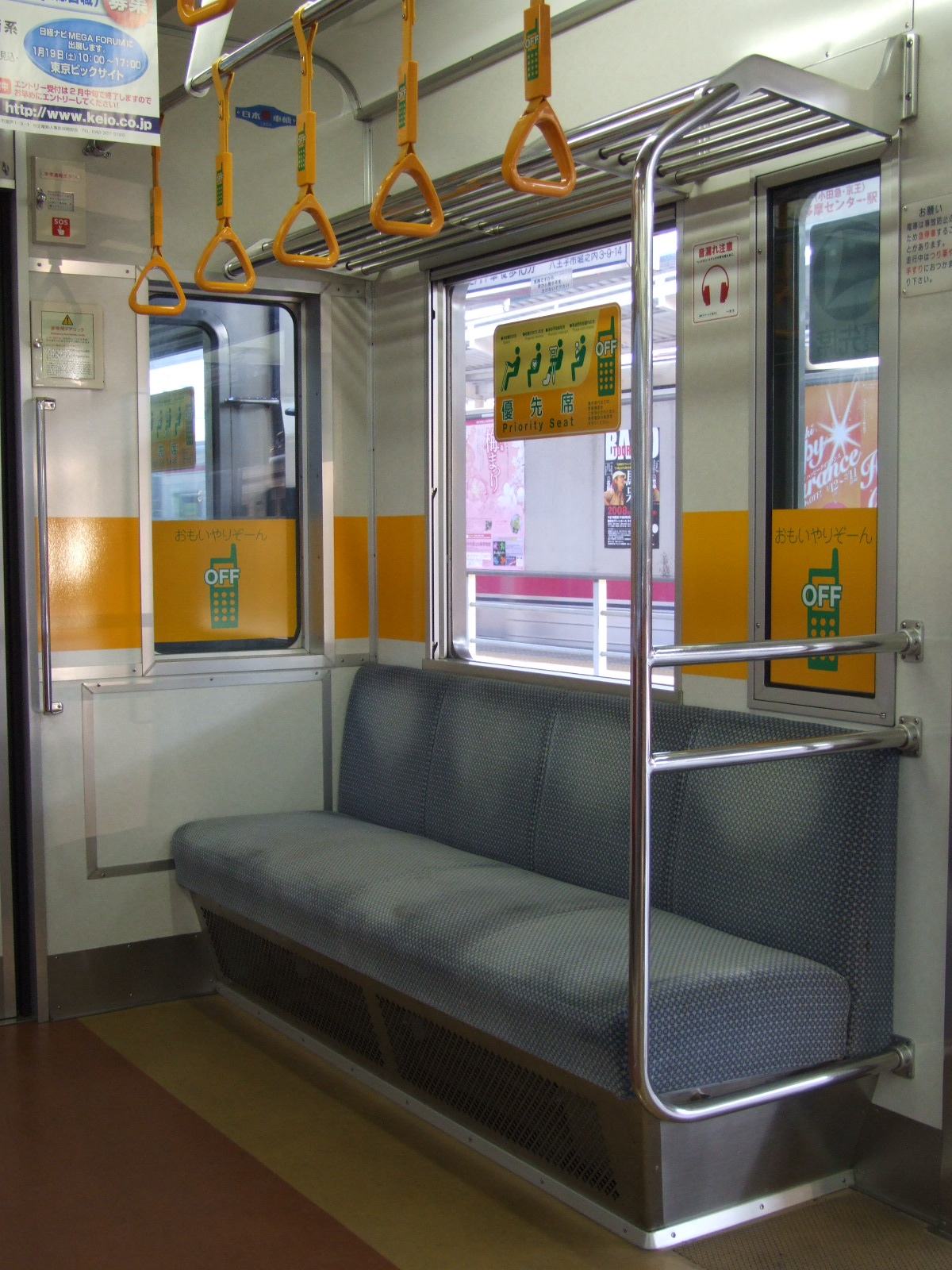
Priority seats of car in original condition

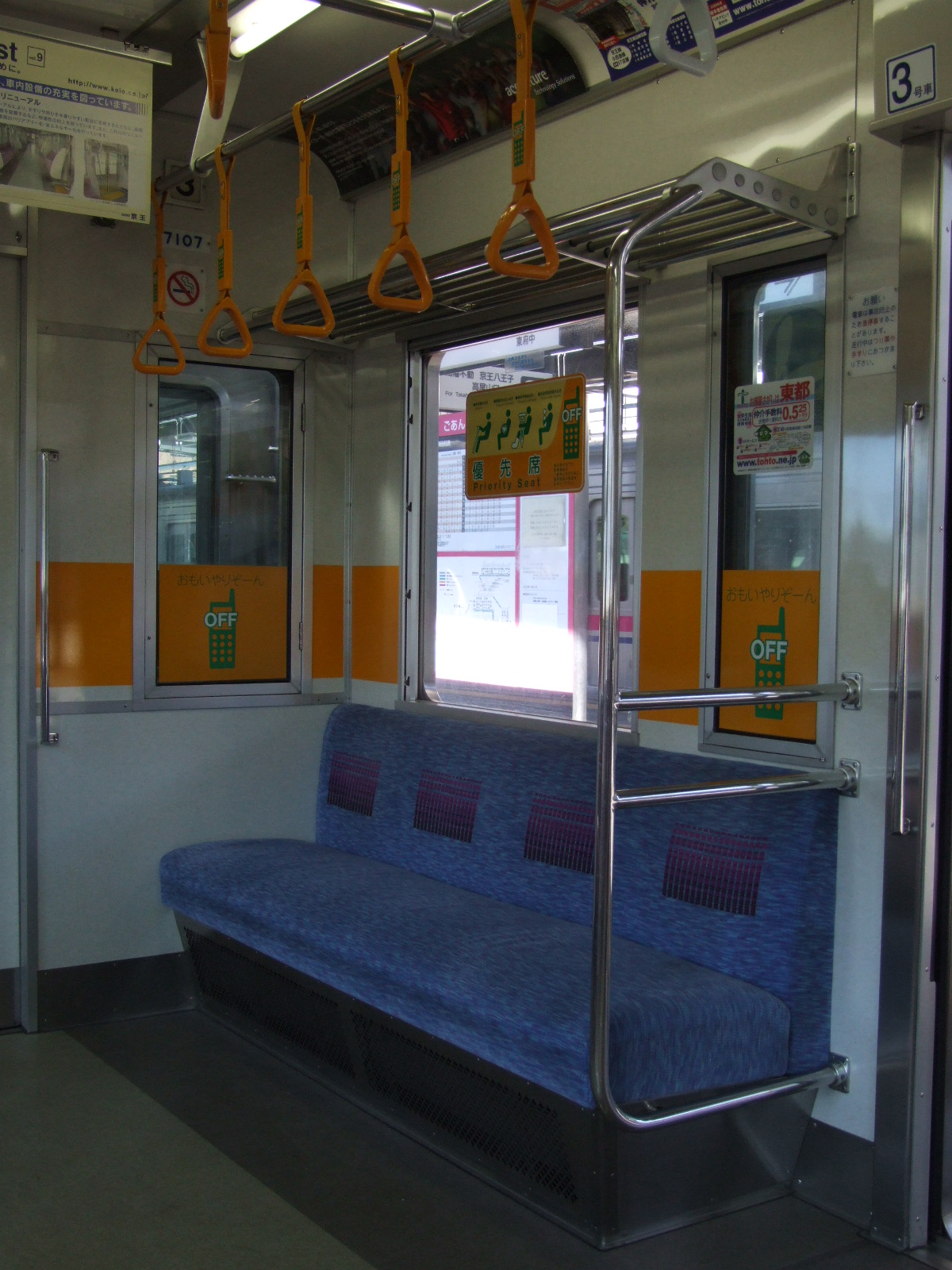
Priority seats of a refurbished car

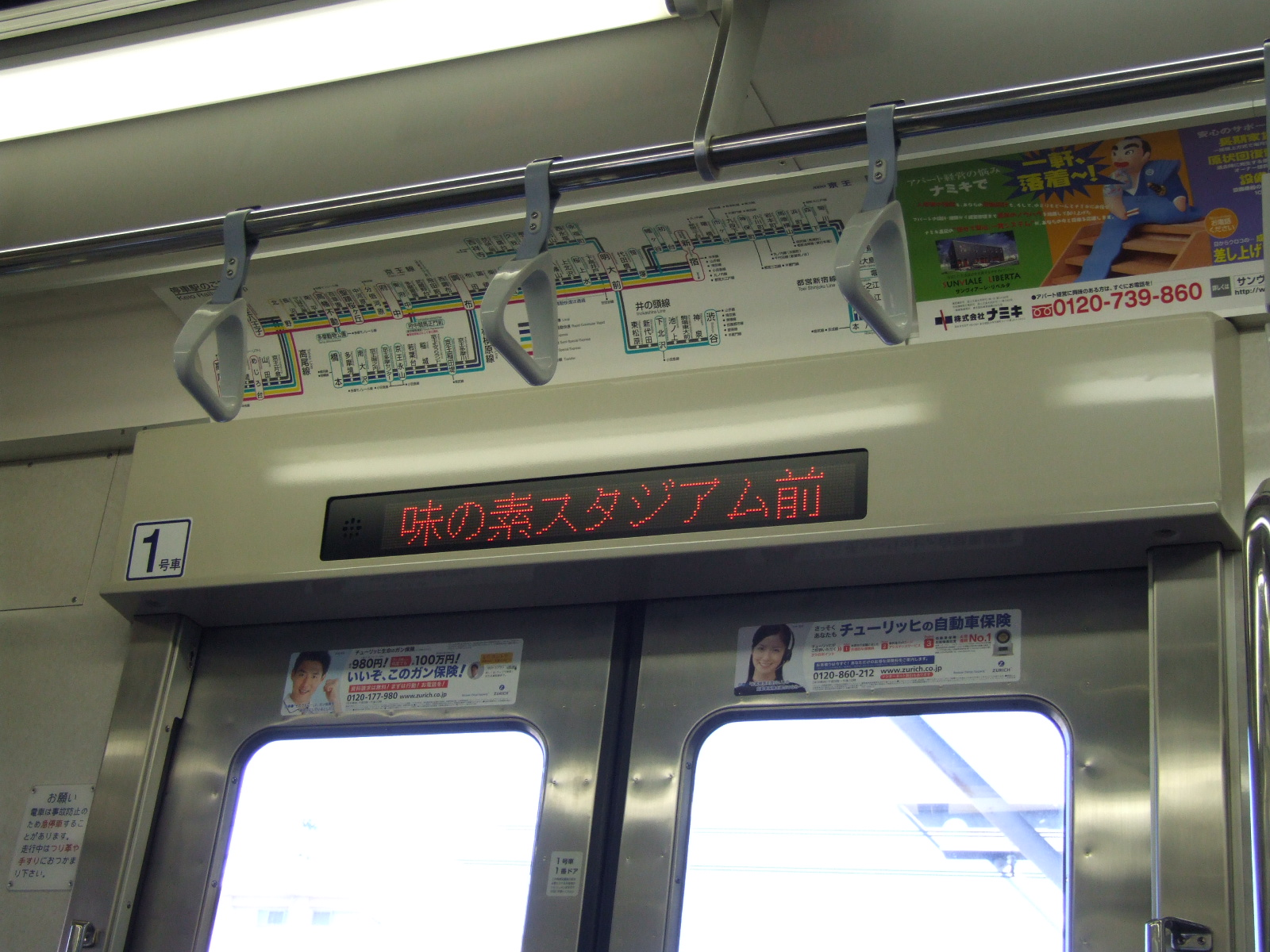
LED passenger information display

== Operations ==
Used on all Keio Corporation lines. (excluding Inokashira Line)

- For daytime operation, 10-car sets or 10-car trains of six-car sets coupled to four-car sets are used as Special Express and Semi Special Express trains.
- Eight-car trains of six-car sets coupled to two-car sets are used mainly as Local or Rapid trains.

== History ==
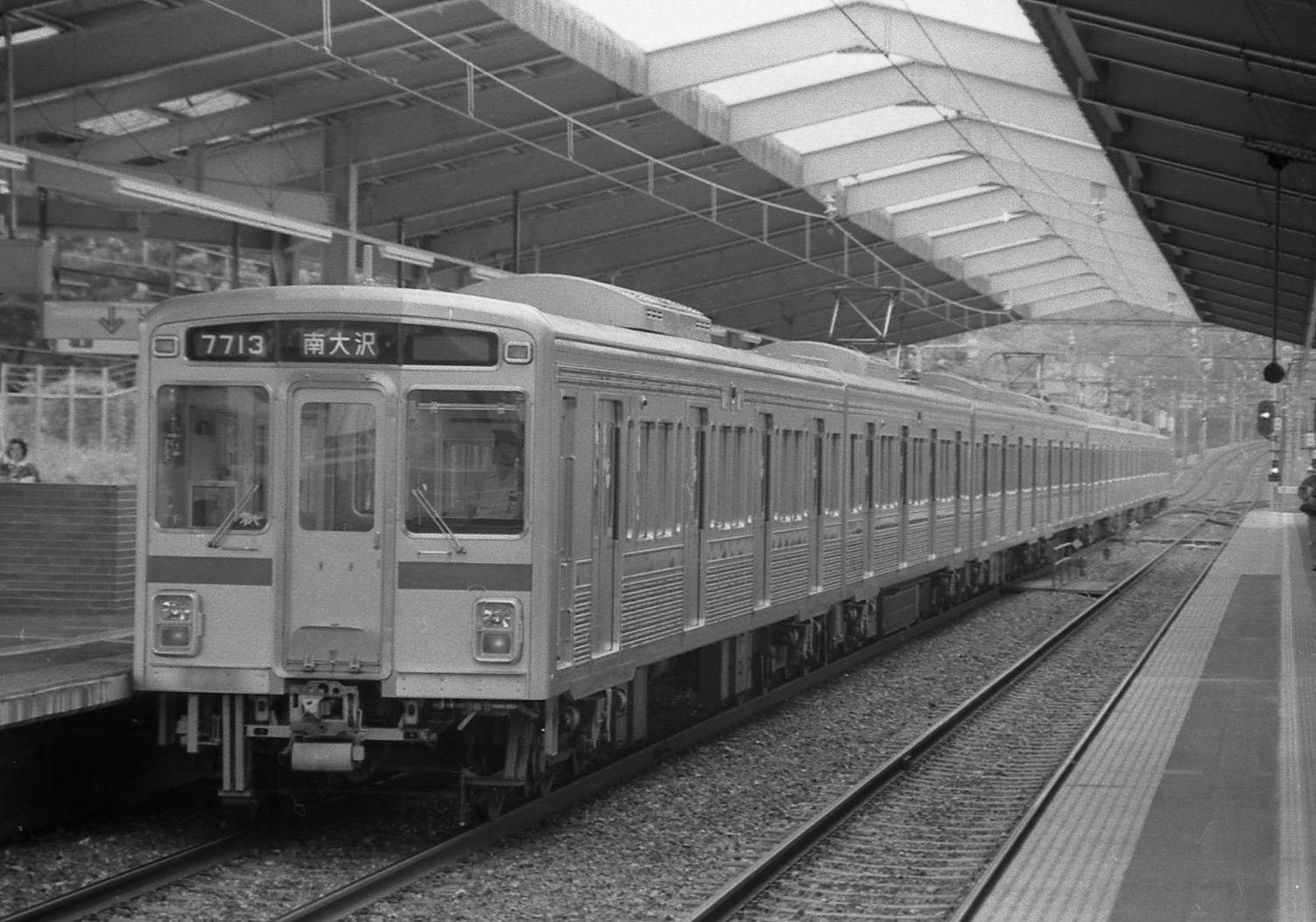
Set 7713 at Wakabadai Station, 1988

The 7000 series began service in 1984. The 7000 series was built for local train service, and the first sets were five-car sets, rather than 4, 6 or 10 cars. The running performance of the new series was nearly the same as the Keio 6000 series. By 1996, 190 cars of the 7000 series had been built.

From 2001, 7000 series sets were introduced on Special Express, Semi Special Express, Express, and Rapid trains.

Keio announced in 2010 that 18 more of its 7000 series cars would be converted to VVVF inverter control. By 2012, the entire fleet was retrofitted with VVVF inverter control.
