= Keiō Dōbutsuen Line =

Railway line in Tokyo, Japan

Dōbutsuen Line

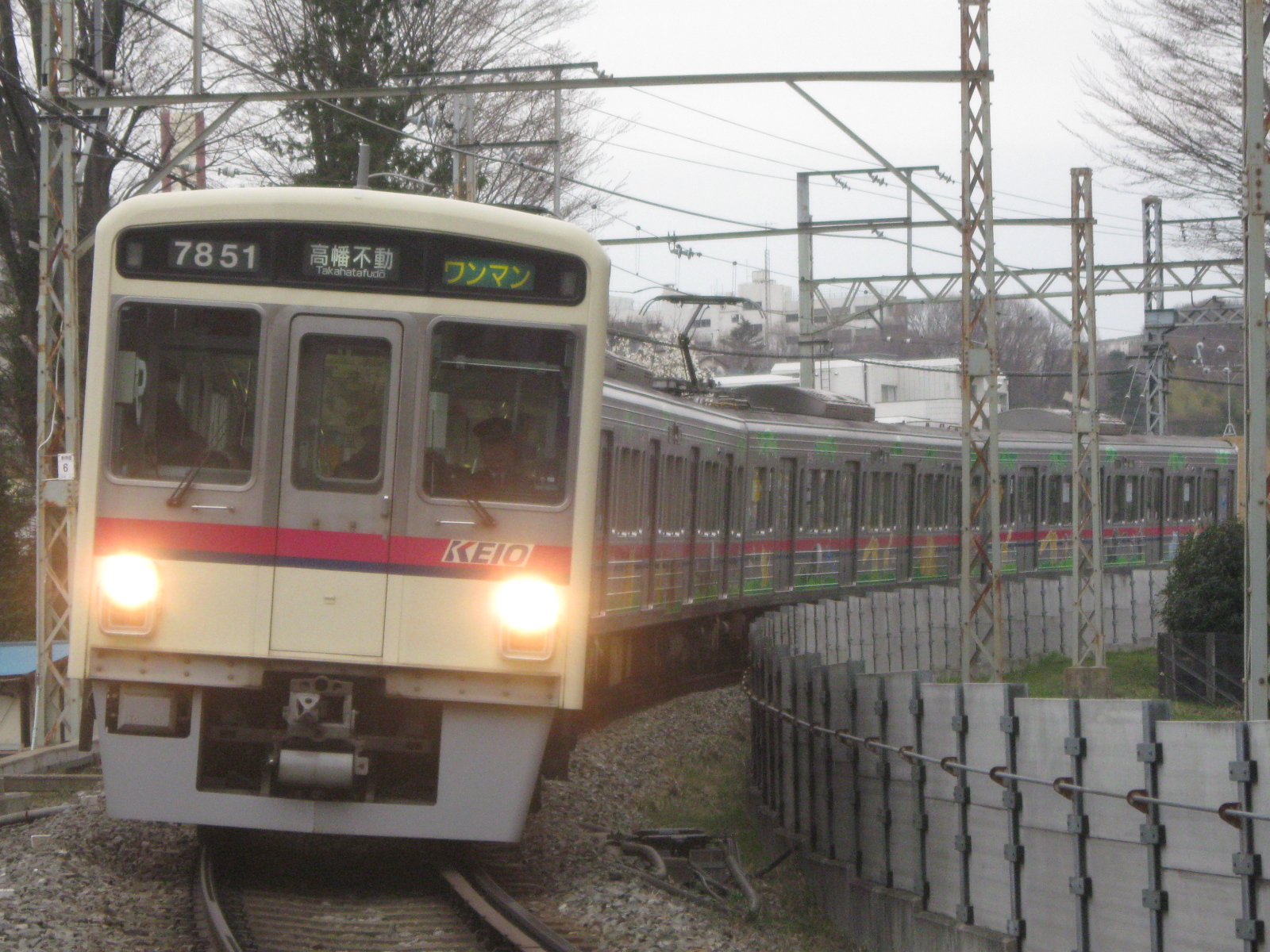
- 7000 series on the Keiō Dōbutsuen Line

Overview
- Native name: 動物園線
- Status: In service
- Owner: Keio Corporation
- Line number: KO
- Locale: Hino, Tokyo
- Termini: Takahatafudō; Tama-Dōbutsukōen
- Stations: 2

Service
- Type: Commuter rail
- System: Keio Electric Railway
- Operator: Keio Corporation
- Rolling stock: Keio 7000 series

History
- Opened: 29 April 1964; 62 years ago

Technical
- Line length: 2.0 km (1.2 mi)
- Num of tracks: Single-track
- Track gauge: 1,372 mm (4 ft 6 in)
- Minimum radius: 162 m (531 ft)
- Electrification: 1,500 V DC (Overhead line)
- Operating speed: 70 km/h (45 mph)
- Train protection system: Keio ATC
- Maximum incline: 3.3%

The Dōbutsuen Line (動物園線, Dōbutsuen-sen; "Zoo Line") is a railway line in Hino, Tokyo, Japan, owned by the Keio Corporation, which connects Takahatafudō on the Keiō Main Line and Tama-Dōbutsukōen (for Tama Zoo and the Keio Rail-Land railway amusement park).

It is a single track of 1,372 mm (4 ft 6 in) gauge. The line is electrified at 1,500 V DC.

== Services ==
Trains operate as a shuttle service between Takahatafudō and Tama-dōbutsukōen, operating approximately every 15 minutes during the morning peak and every 20 minutes at all other times. Running time is 3-4 minutes.

== Stations ==
All stations are located in Hino, Tokyo.

No	Station	Japanese	Distance (km)	Transfers
KO-29	Takahatafudō	高幡不動	0.0	Keiō Line (KO29); Tama Toshi Monorail Line (TT05)
KO-47	Tama-dōbutsukōen	多摩動物公園	2.0	Tama Toshi Monorail Line (TT07)

== Destinations ==
- Keio Rail-Land, a medium-sized railway museum, is adjacent to Tama-dōbutsukōen Station.
- Tama Zoological Park (Tama Zoo) is opposite Tama-dōbutsukōen Station.

== History ==
The line opened on 29 April 1964.

"Wanman" one-person operation started in 2000.

The line experienced a drop in ridership numbers following the closure of the Tama Tech theme park in 2009.

In 2011, operation switched from 6000 series to 7000 series trainsets.
