= Tama-dōbutsukōen Station =

Railway and monorail station in Hino, Tokyo, Japan

Tama-Dōbutsukōen Station 多摩動物公園駅
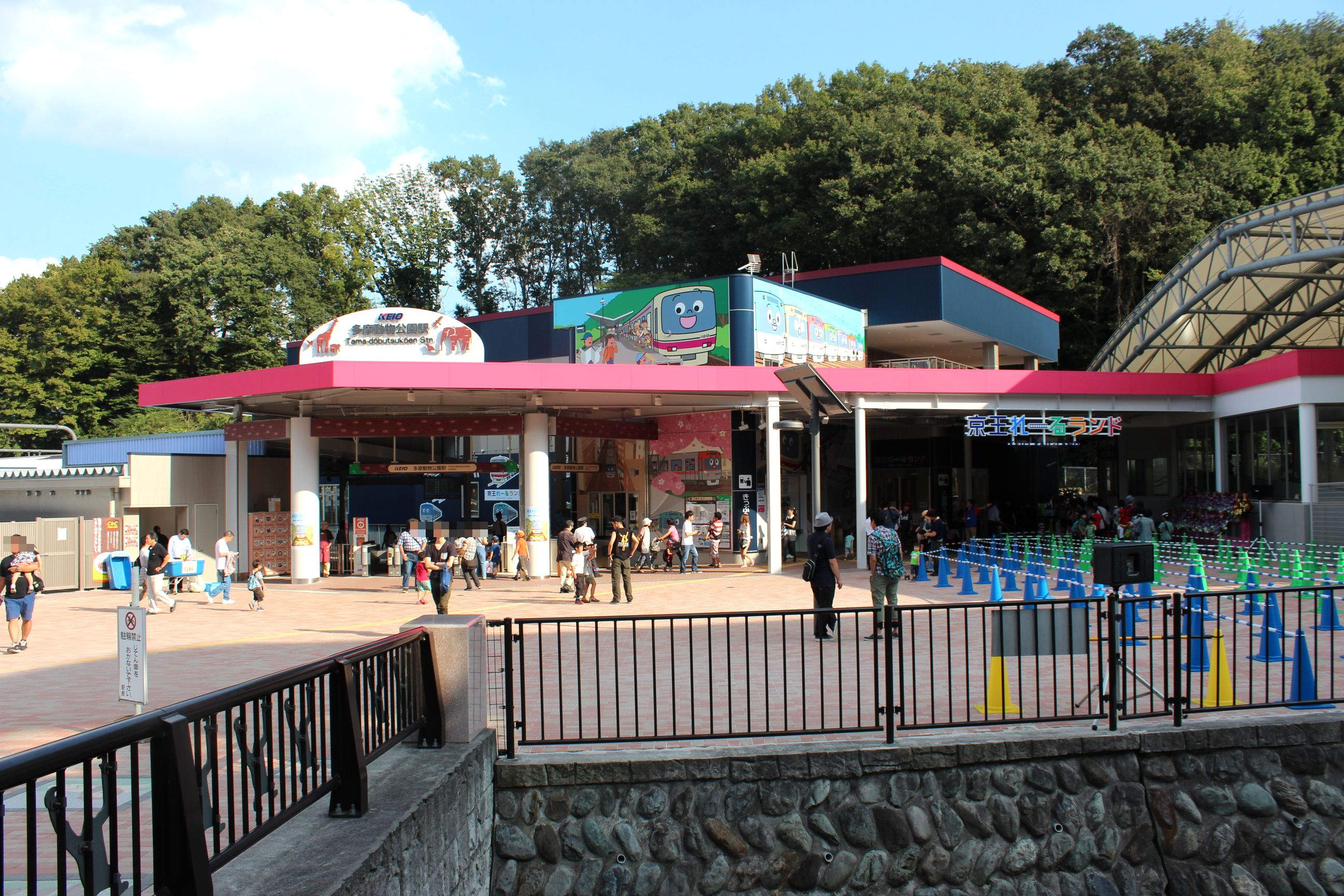
- Tama-Dōbutsukōen Station, October 2013

General information
- Location: Hodokubo, Hino-shi, Tokyo 191-0042; Japan
- Coordinates: 35.6489°N 139.4043°E
- Operator: Keio Corporation; Tokyo Tama Intercity Monorail
- Lines: Keiō Dōbutsuen Line; ■ Tama Toshi Monorail Line
- Connections: Bus terminal
Location
- Location within Tokyo Location within Japan

Tama-Dōbutsukōen Station (多摩動物公園駅, Tama-Dōbutsukōen-eki) is a junction passenger railway station and monorail station located in the city of Hino, Tokyo, jointly operated by the private railway operator Keio Corporation and the Tama Toshi Monorail. The station is next to Tama Zoo, from which it takes its name.

== Lines ==
Tama-Dōbutsukōen Station is served by the 2.0 km Keiō Dōbutsuen Line branch from Takahatafudo on the Keio Line, and also by the Tama Toshi Monorail Line from Kamikitadai to Tama Center.

== Station layout ==
Tama-Dōbutsukōen Station 多摩動物公園駅

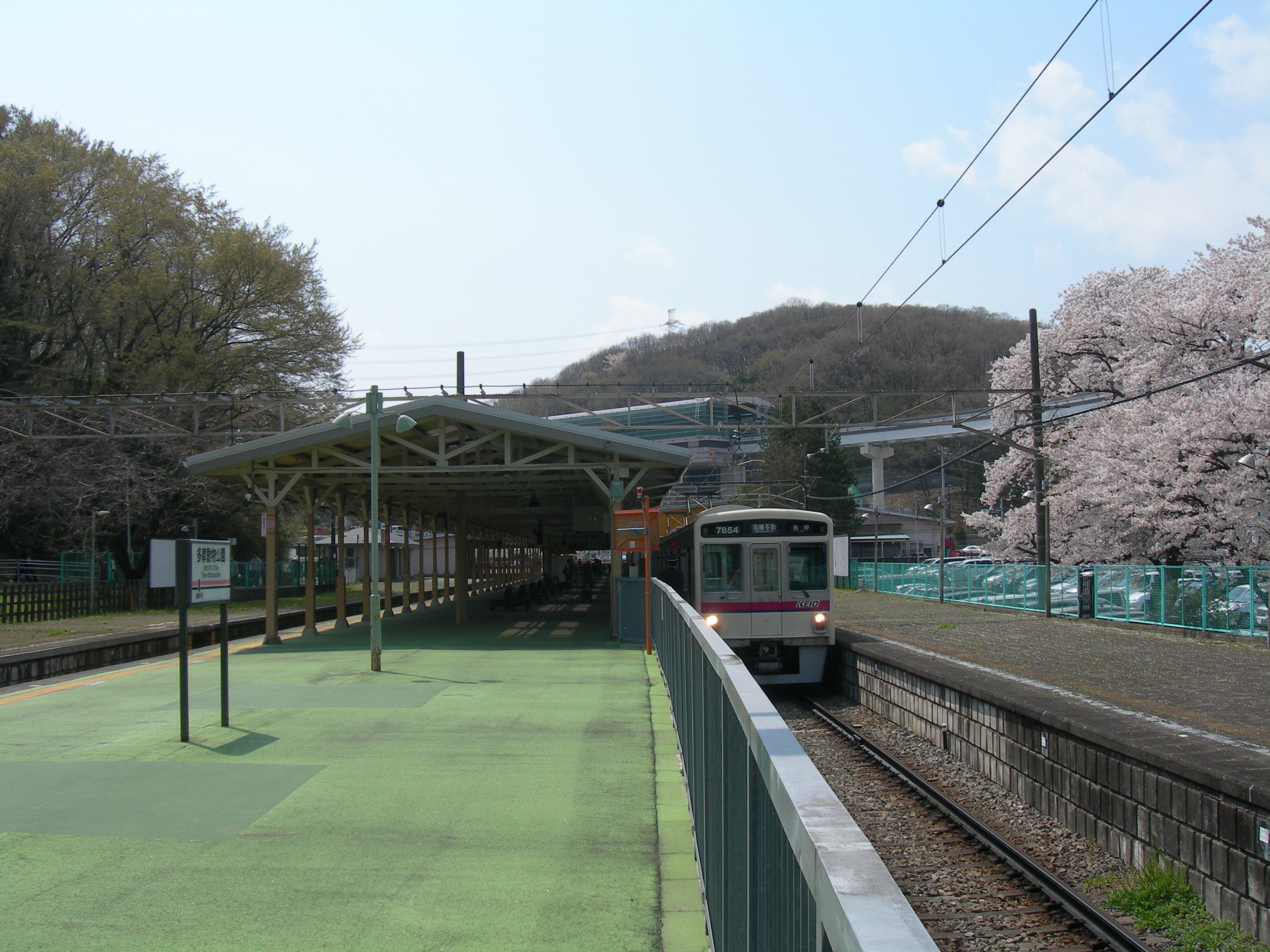
- Tama-Dōbutsukōen Station platform, April 2008

General information
- Location: 3-36-39 Hodokubo, Hino-shi, Tokyo 191-0042; Japan
- System: Keio railway station
- Operator: Keio Corporation
- Line: Keiō Dōbutsuen Line
- Distance: 31.7 km from Shinjuku
- Platforms: 1 bay platform
- Connections: Bus terminal

Other information
- Station code: KO47

History
- Opened: April 29, 1964

Passengers
- FY2019: 6,073

Services
Preceding station	Keio Corporation	Following station
Terminus	Dōbutsuen Line Express Local	Takahatafudō Terminus
Location

=== Keio Corporation ===
The Keio station has one bay platform serving two tracks.

Tama-DōbutsukōenStation 多摩動物公園駅
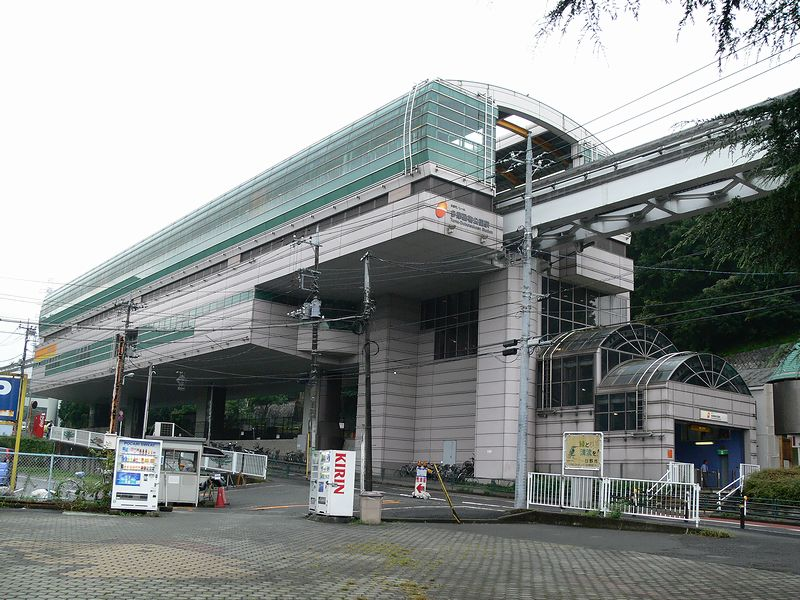
- Tama-Dōbutsukōen Station (Tama Monorail)

General information
- Location: 7-1 Takahata, Hino-shi, Tokyo 191-0042
- System: monorail station
- Operator: Tokyo Tama Intercity Monorail
- Line: ■ Tama Toshi Monorail Line
- Distance: 12.3 km from Kamikitadai
- Platforms: 2 side platforms
- Connections: Bus terminal

Other information
- Station code: TT05

History
- Opened: 10 January 2000

Passengers
- FY2019: 2,308

Services
Preceding station	Tokyo Tama Intercity Monorail	Following station
Chūō-Daigaku-Meisei-Daigaku (TT-04) towards Tama-Center	Tama Toshi Monorail Line	Hodokubo (TT-06) towards Kamikitadai
Location

=== Tama Toshi Monorail ===
Tama-Dōbutsukōen Station is a raised station with two tracks and two opposed side platforms, with the station building located underneath. It is a standardized station building for this monorail line.

==== Platforms ====
1	■ Tama Toshi Monorail Line	Tachikawa-Kita, Tamagawa-Jōsui, Kamikitadai
2	■ Tama Toshi Monorail Line	Takahatafudō, Tama-Center

== History ==
The Keio station opened on 29 April 1964. The Tama Toshi Monorail station opened on 10 January 2000.

Station numbering was introduced to the Tama Toshi Monorail Line in February 2018 with the station being assigned station number TT05.

== Passenger statistics ==
In fiscal 2019, the Keio station was used by an average of 6,073 passengers daily. During the same period, the Tama Monorail portion of the station was used by 2,308 passengers daily.

== Surrounding area ==
The Keio Rail-Land railway museum is located adjacent to this station.

== See also ==
- List of railway stations in Japan
