= Keio 6000 series =

Japanese train type

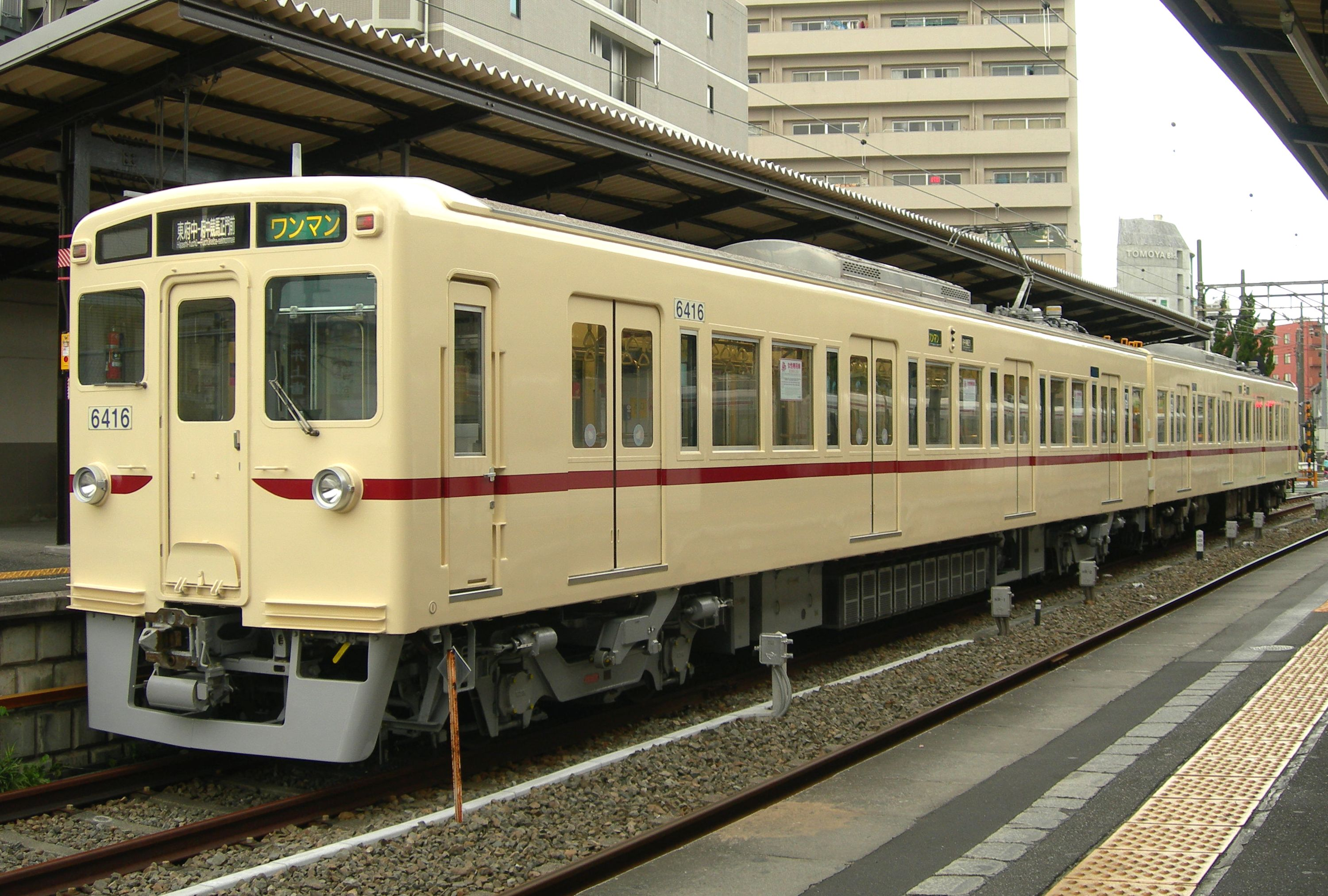
- Set 6416 in November 2009
- In service: 1972–2011
- Entered service: 23 May 1972
- Number built: 304 vehicles
- Number in service: None
- Number preserved: 1 vehicle, 2 cab ends
- Number scrapped: 301 vehicles
- Formation: 2/3/4/5/6/8 cars per trainset
- Operator: Keio Corporation
- Lines served: Keiō Line; Keiō New Line; Keiō Dōbutsuen Line; Keiō Sagamihara Line; Keiō Takao Line; Keiō Keibajō Line; Toei Shinjuku Line

Specifications
- Car body construction: Steel
- Car length: 20 m (65 ft 7 in)
- Maximum speed: 110 km/h (68 mph)
- Traction system: Resistor control; Field chopper control
- Acceleration: 2.5 km/(h⋅s) (1.6 mph/s) (3.3 km/(h⋅s) (2.1 mph/s) for 6030 series on Shinjuku Line)
- Deceleration: 4.0 km/(h⋅s) (2.5 mph/s); 4.5 km/(h⋅s) (2.8 mph/s) (emergency)
- Electric systems: 1,500 V DC overhead line
- Current collection: Pantograph
- Multiple working: 9000 series, 7000 series
- Track gauge: 1,372 mm (4 ft 6 in)

The Keio 6000 series (京王6000系, Keiō 6000-kei) was an electric multiple unit (EMU) train type in Japan, operated by Keio Corporation on its suburban Tokyo commuter rail network between 1972 and 2011. It was the first rolling stock in Keio's history with 20 m (65 ft 7 in) long cars with four pairs of doors per car side. Sets were refurbished from 1986 to extend their service life.

A four-car formation was used on the Keio Dobutsuen Line as a wanman driver-only-operated shuttle service.

== Technical specifications ==
- Motor output: 150 kilowatts (200 hp)
- Formation: 2 cars (cleared for Toei Shinjuku Line), 3 cars, 4 cars, 5 cars, 6 cars, 8 cars
- Control system: field chopper (initial car was resistance control)
- Some have 5 doors, but some were rebuilt with 4 doors. 4-car trains (only used on Dōbutsuen Line) and 6-car trains had 5 pairs of doors on each side, and 5-car sets had rebuilt cars.

== Operations ==
- Keiō Line (including Keiō New Line)
- Keiō Dōbutsuen Line
- Keiō Sagamihara Line
- Keiō Takao Line
- Keiō Keibajō Line
- Toei Shinjuku Line

== Interior ==
Passenger accommodation consisted of longitudinal bench seating throughout.

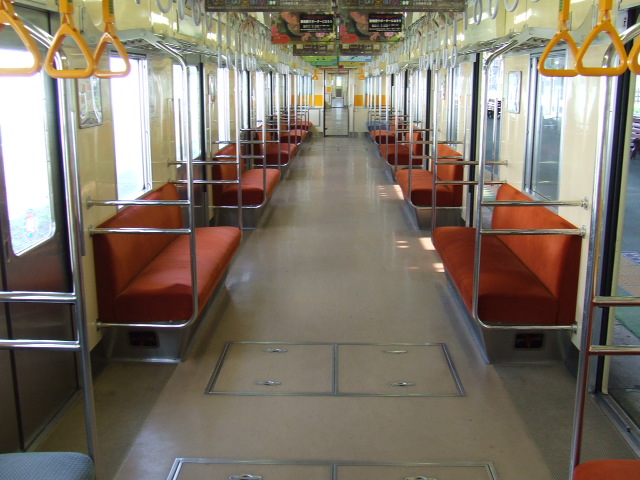
Interior view

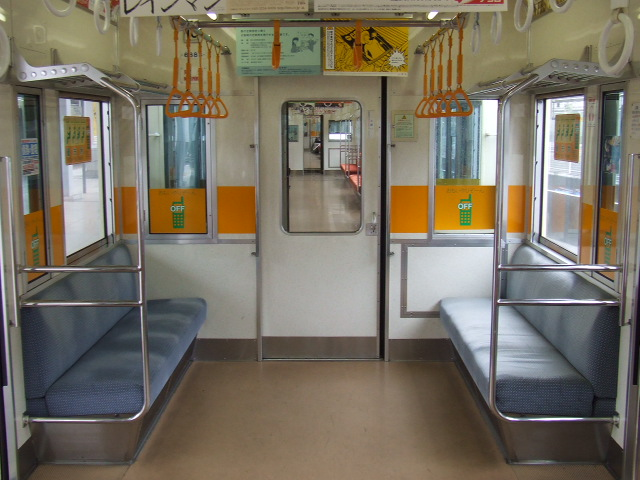
Priority Seats

== History ==
The first units entered service on 23 May 1972.

The type was withdrawn from service on 13 March 2011.

== DeWa 600 series ==
Three cars were converted to maintenance cars and reclassified as DeWa 600 series in October 2004. The DeWa 600 series replaced the older DeWa 5000 series maintenance cars which were operated since 1995. The remodeling went as follows:

- 6107 (set 6707) → 601 (the cab from car 6707 was transferred)
- 6407 (set 6708) → 621 (a simple cab was added)
- 6457 (set 6708) → 631

The cars received a new grey livery with red and white diagonal stripes.

The DeWa 600 series was used with ChiKi 290 or KuYa 900 sandwiched between cars 601 and 621. It also served as a shunting vehicle at Wakabadai depot.

Following the introduction of successor maintenance cars DeYa 901 and DeYa 902 in September 2015, the DeWa 600 series was withdrawn from service and scrapped in April 2016.

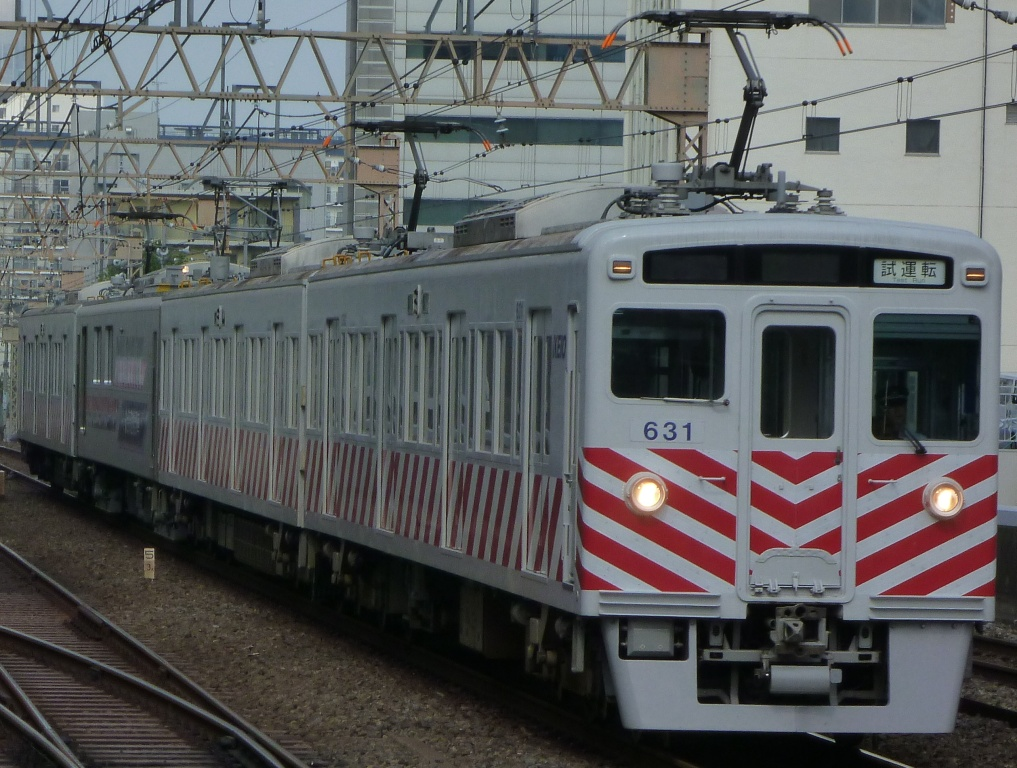
DeWa 600 series set 631 in June 2014
