= Hino, Tokyo =

Hino 日野市
- City
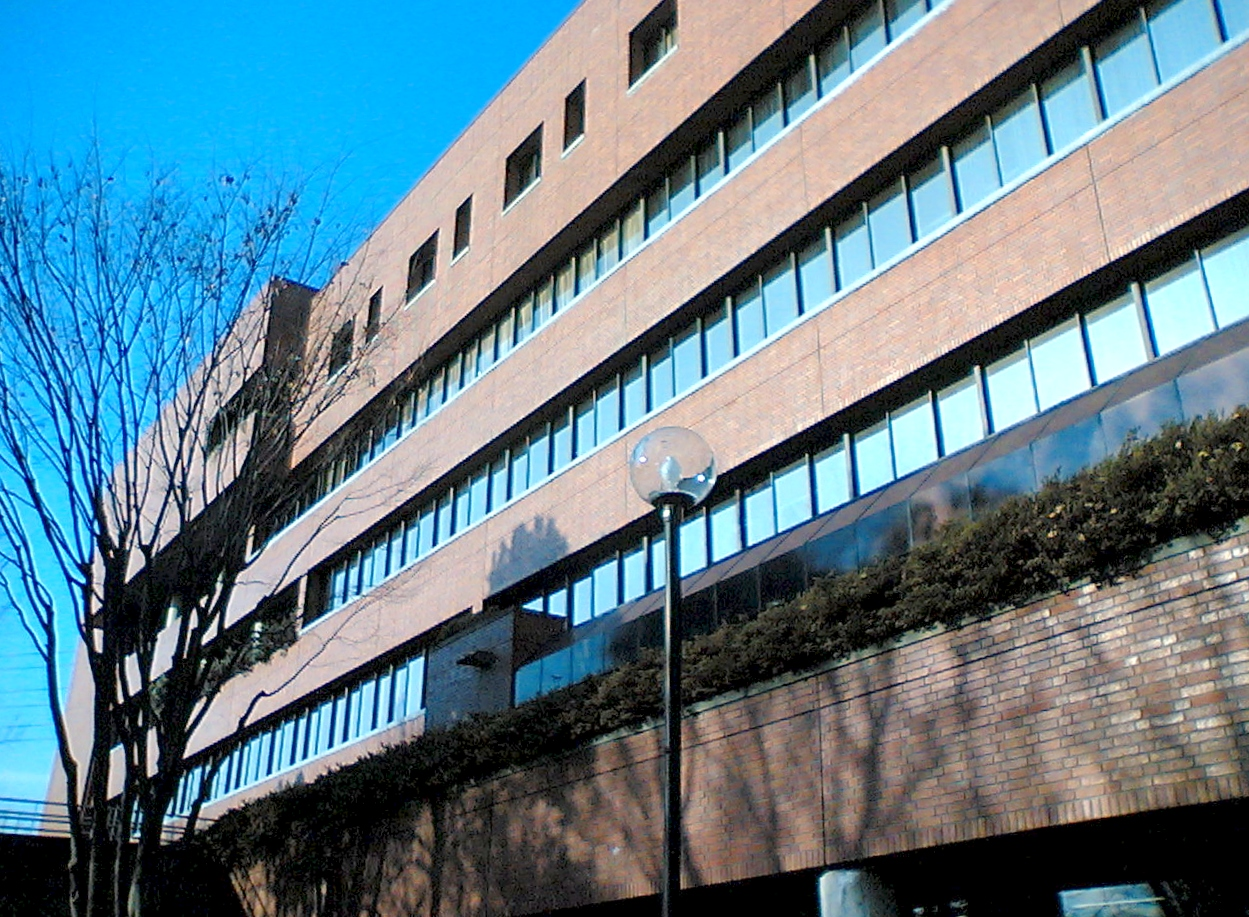
- Hino City Hall

- Flag Seal

- Location of Hino in Tokyo Metropolis

- Coordinates: 35°40′16.6″N 139°23′42.5″E
- Country: Japan
- Region: Kantō
- Prefecture: Tokyo
- First official recorded: late 7th century AD
- City settled: November 3, 1963

Government
  - Mayor: Fuyuhiko Otsubo (since April 2013)

Area
  - Total: 27.55 km^{2} (10.64 sq mi)

Population (April 2021)
  - Total: 187,048
  - Density: 6,789/km^{2} (17,580/sq mi)
- Time zone: UTC+9 (Japan Standard Time)
- City symbols
  - Tree: Live oak
  - Flower: Chrysanthemum
  - Bird: Common kingfisher
- Phone number: 042-585-1111
- Address: 1-12-1 Shimmei, Hino-shi, Tokyo-to 191-8686
- Website: Official website

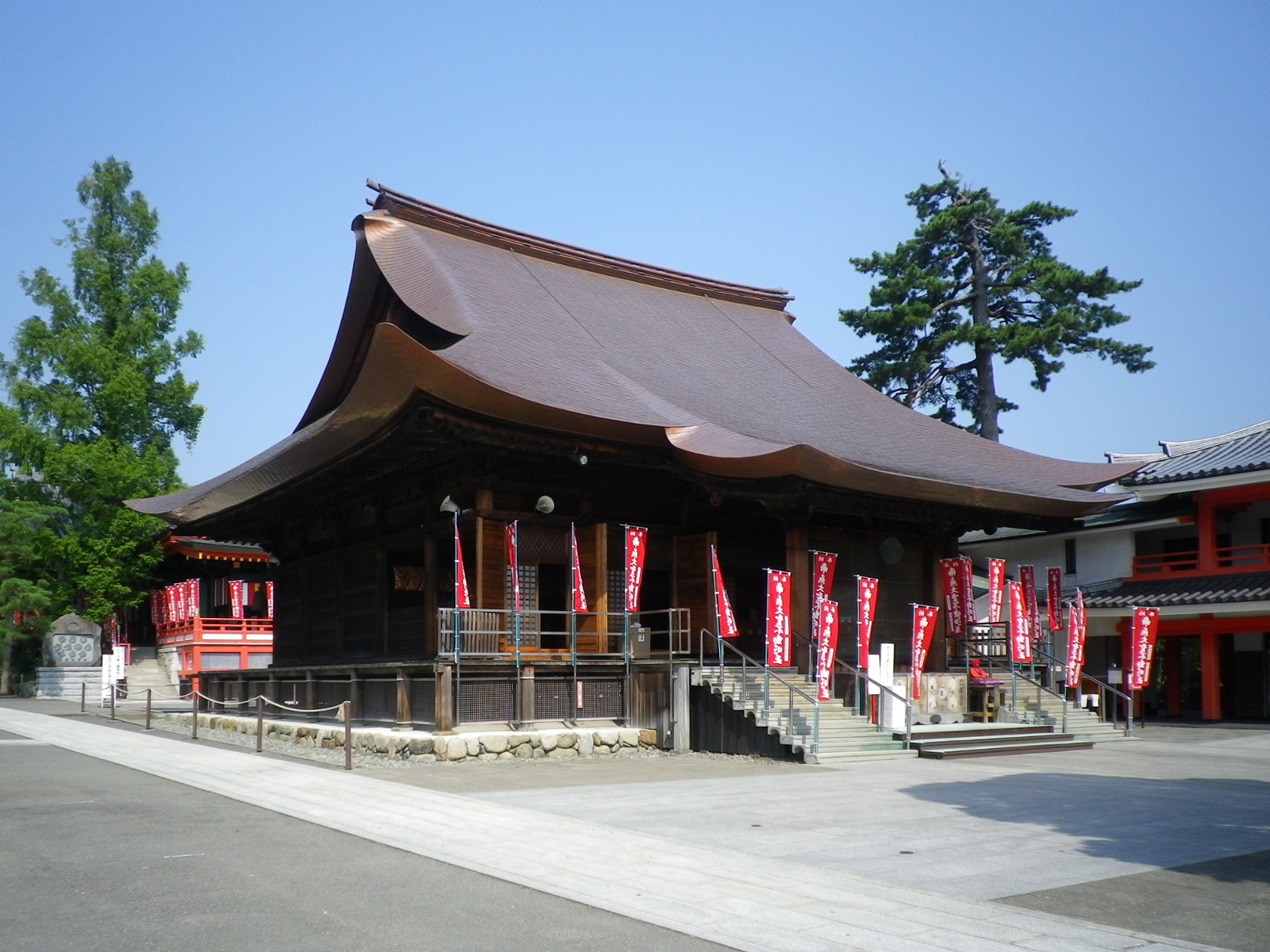
Takahata Fudō in Hino

Hino (日野市, Hino-shi) is a city located in the western portion of the Tokyo Metropolis, Japan. As of 1 April 2021, the city had an estimated population of 187,048, and a population density of 6,800 people per km^{2}. The total area of the city was 27.55 square kilometres (10.64 sq mi).

== History ==
The area of present-day Hino was part of ancient Musashi Province. During the Edo period, the village of Hino developed as a post station on the Kōshū Kaidō.

In the post-Meiji Restoration cadastral reform of 1871, Hino-juku became part of Kanagawa Prefecture. In the reorganization of districts in 1889, Hino-juku came under the jurisdiction of Minamitama District. The entire district was transferred to the control of Tokyo Prefecture on April 1, 1893, at which time Hino-juku was proclaimed Hino Town under the modern municipalities system. The area of the town expanded through annexation of neighboring villages in 1901 and 1958. On November 3, 1963, Hino was elevated to city status.

== Geography ==
Hino is in Western Tokyo. The city has three geographical regions. The western part is called the Hino plateau, approximately 100 meters above sea level. The southern part is Tama Hills, between 150 and 200 meters above sea level. The eastern part of the city is an alluvial plain of the Tama River.

=== Surrounding municipalities ===
Tokyo Metropolis

- Akishima
- Fuchū
- Hachiōji
- Kunitachi
- Tachikawa
- Tama

=== Climate ===
Hino has a humid subtropical climate (Köppen Cfa) characterized by warm summers and cool winters with light to no snowfall. The average annual temperature in Hino is 13.9 °C. The average annual rainfall is 1647 mm with September as the wettest month. The temperatures are highest on average in August, at around 25.4 °C, and lowest in January, at around 2.9 °C.

== Demographics ==
Per Japanese census data, the population of Hino increased rapidly in the late 20th century and has continued to grow at a slower pace since.

Historical population
Year	Pop.	±%
1920	8,150	—
1930	9,175	+12.6%
1940	12,476	+36.0%
1950	24,444	+95.9%
1960	43,394	+77.5%
1970	98,557	+127.1%
1980	145,448	+47.6%
1990	165,928	+14.1%
2000	167,942	+1.2%
2010	180,052	+7.2%
2020	190,435	+5.8%

== Government ==
Hino has a mayor-council form of government with a directly elected mayor and a unicameral city council of 24 members. Hino contributes two members to the Tokyo Metropolitan Assembly. In terms of national politics, the city is part of Tokyo 21st district of the lower house of the Diet of Japan.

=== Politics ===
- 2005 Hino mayoral election

== Economy ==
Hino is largely a regional commercial center and bedroom community for central Tokyo.

Hino is the hometown of Orient Watch Co., Ltd. established in 1950 by Shogoro Yoshida.

On December 22, 2008, operations of Seiko Epson's Tokyo sales office began at Seiko Epson's Hino Office. Previously operations were at the World Trade Center in Minato, Tokyo.

Hino also houses the headquarters of Hino Motors, a Toyota Group company producing semi-trailer trucks (British and Irish: articulated lorries), box trucks and buses.

== Education ==
=== Universities ===
- Tokyo Metropolitan University – Hino campus
- Meisei University
- Jissen Women's University
- Sugino Fashion College – Hino campus

=== Primary and secondary ===
There are three metropolitan high schools operated by the Tokyo Metropolitan Government Board of Education.

- Hino High School
- Hinodai High School
- Minamidaira High School

Hino has 17 municipal elementary schools and eight public junior high schools operated by the Hino City Board of Education.

Municipal junior high schools:

- Hino No. 1 (日野第一中学校)
- Hino No. 2 (日野第二中学校)
- Hino No. 3 (日野第三中学校)
- Hino No. 4 (日野第四中学校)
- Hirayama (平山中学校)
- Misawa (三沢中学校)
- Nanao (七生中学校)
- Ohsakaue (大坂上中学校)

Municipal elementary schools:

- Asahigaoka (旭が丘小学校)
- Hino No. 1 (日野第一小学校)
- Hino No. 3 (日野第三小学校)
- Hino No. 4 (日野第四小学校)
- Hino No. 5 (日野第五小学校)
- Hino No. 6 (日野第六小学校)
- Hino No. 7 (日野第七小学校)
- Hino No. 8 (日野第八小学校)
- Hirayama (平山小学校)
- Juntoku (潤徳小学校)
- Minamidaira (南平小学校)
- Nakada (仲田小学校)
- Nanaomidori (七生緑小学校)
- Takiai (滝合小学校)
- Tokoji (東光寺小学校)
- Toyoda (豊田小学校)
- Yumeagaoka (夢が丘小学校)

== Transportation ==
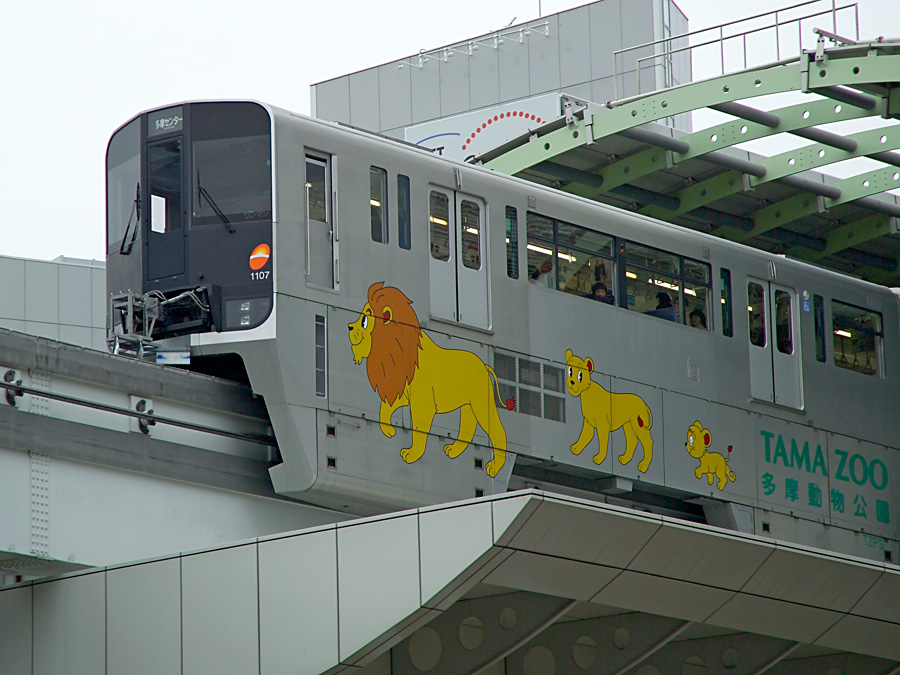
A Tama Toshi Monorail Line train carrying advertising for Tama Zoo

=== Railway ===
JR East – JR East – Chūō Main Line

- Hino - Toyoda

Keio Corporation - Keio Corporation – Keiō Line

- Mogusaen - Takahatafudō - Minamidaira - Hirayamajōshi-kōen

Keio Corporation - Keio Corporation – Keiō Dōbutsuen Line

- Takahatafudō - Tama-Dōbutsukōen

Tokyo Tama Intercity Monorail - Tama Toshi Monorail Line

- Kōshū-Kaidō - Manganji - Takahatafudō - Hodokubo - Tama-Dōbutsukōen

=== Highway ===
- Chūō Expressway
- National Route 20 (Hino Bypass)

== Local attractions ==
- Tama Zoological Park

== Sister cities ==
- Redlands, California, United States, since February 2004
- Shiwa, Iwate Prefecture, Japan, since January 2017

== Notable people ==
- Saki Baba, golfer
- Inoue Genzaburō, Bakumatsu period samurai
- Tomonobu Hiroi, soccer player
- Hideaki Kikuchi, guitarist
- Yuzo Koshiro, composer
- Masatoshi Mashima, guitarist
- Shunsuke Sasaki, baseball player
- Hiroaki Shukuzawa, rugby union player and coach
- Shikao Suga, musician and singer-songwriter
- Hijikata Toshizō, Bakumatsu period samurai
- Satoshi Uematsu, perpetrator in the Sagamihara stabbings
- Yuriko Yamamoto, voice actress
- Kōtarō Yoshida, actor

== In popular culture ==
The manga and anime series My Deer Friend Nokotan takes place in a fictional Hino City, at the same geographic location.
