= Izumi-Taiikukan Station =

Monorail station in Tachikawa, Tokyo, Japan

Coordinates: 35°43′07″N 139°25′10″E

Izumi-Taiikukan Station 泉体育館駅
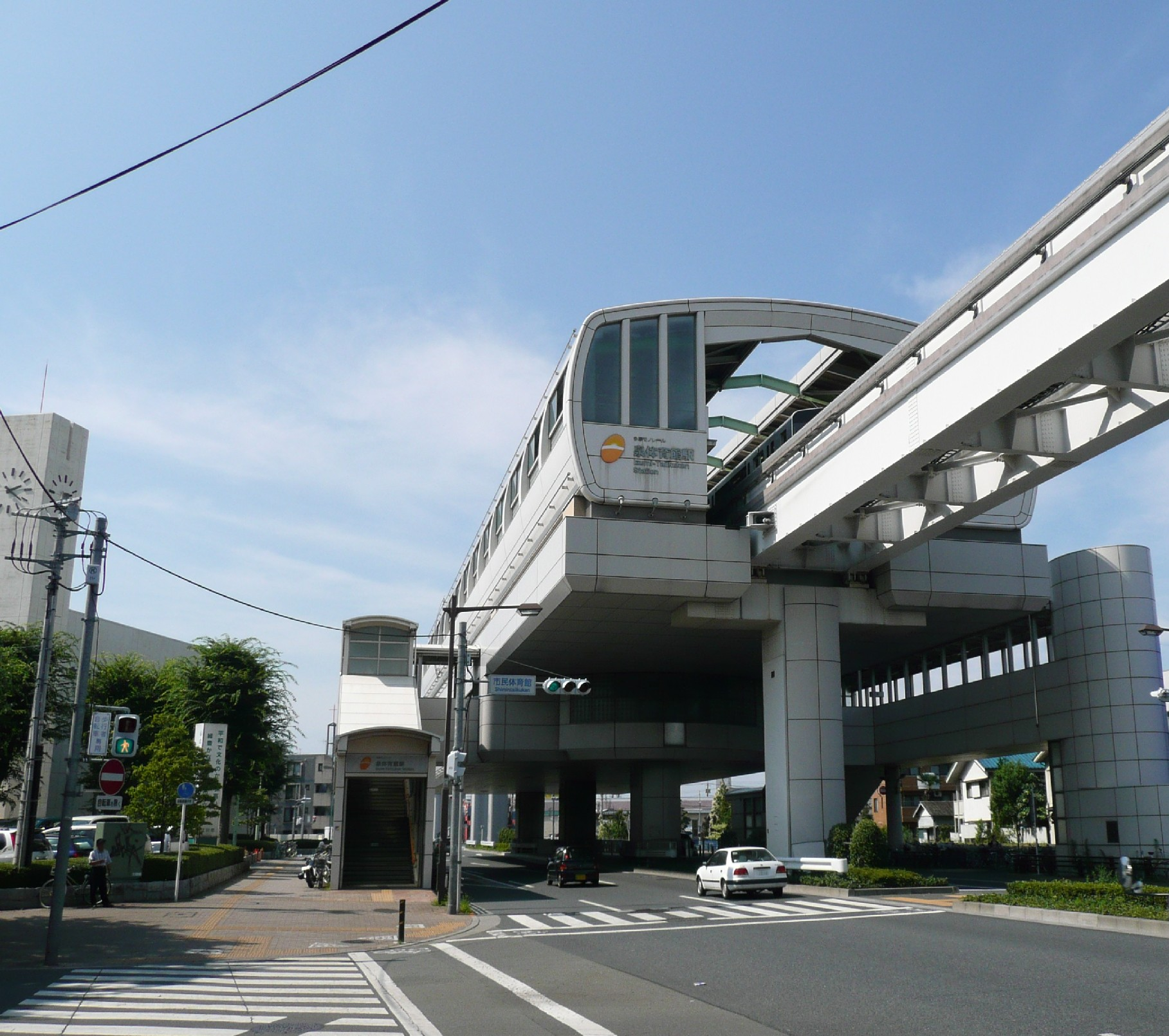
- Izumi-Taiikukan Station

General information
- Location: 841 Izumi-chō, Tachikawa, Tokyo （東京都立川市泉町841） Japan
- Operator: Tokyo Tama Intercity Monorail
- Line: ■ Tama Toshi Monorail Line
- Platforms: 2 side platforms
- Connections: Bus stop

Other information
- Station code: TT15

History
- Opened: 27 November 1998

Passengers
- FY2013: 2,809 daily

Services
Preceding station	Tokyo Tama Intercity Monorail	Following station
Tachihi (TT-14) towards Tama-Center	Tama Toshi Monorail Line	Sunagawa-Nanaban (TT-16) towards Kamikitadai
Location

Izumi-Taiikukan Station (泉体育館駅, Izumi-taiikukan-eki) is a station on the Tama Toshi Monorail Line in Tachikawa, Tokyo, Japan.

== Lines ==
Izumi-taiikukan Station is a station on the Tama Toshi Monorail Line and is located 3.0 kilometers from the terminus of the line at Kamikitadai Station.

== Station layout ==
Izumi-Taiikukan Station is a raised station with two tracks and two opposed side platforms, with the station building located underneath. It is a standardized station building for this monorail line.

=== Platforms ===
1	■ Tama Toshi Monorail Line	Tamagawa-Jōsui, Kamikitadai
2	■ Tama Toshi Monorail Line	Tachikawa-Kita, Takahatafudō, Tama-Center

== Adjacent stations ==
«	Service	»
Tama Toshi Monorail Line
Sunagawa-Nanaban	Local	Tachihi

== History ==
The station opened on 27 November 1998.

Station numbering was introduced in February 2018 with Izumi-taiikukan being assigned TT14.

== Surrounding area ==
The station is above Tokyo Metropolitan Route 43 (Imokubo Kaidō). The surrounding area is primarily residential. Other points of interest include:

- Tachikawa Municipal Izumi Gymnasium
- Tokyo Metropolitan Sunagawa Senior High School
- Tachikawa City Fifth Junior High School
- TOTO Tachikawa Showroom
