= Tachihi Station =

Monorail station in Tachikawa, Tokyo, Japan

Coordinates: 35°42′52″N 139°25′02″E

Tachihi Station 立飛駅
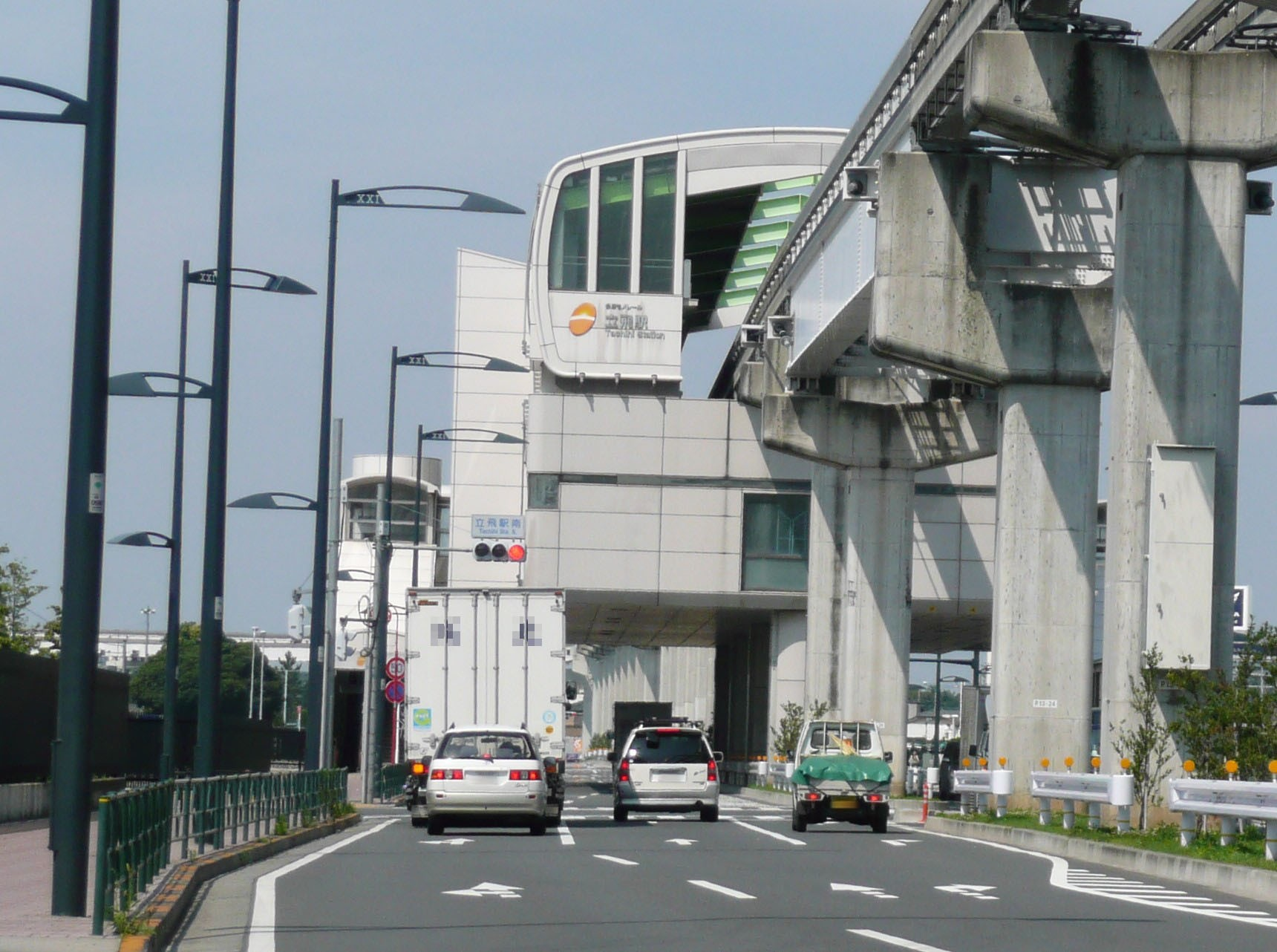
- Tachihi Station in July 2008

General information
- Location: 935 Izumi-chō, Tachikawa-shi, Tokyo 190-0015; Japan
- Operator: Tokyo Tama Intercity Monorail
- Line: ■ Tama Toshi Monorail Line
- Distance: 3.6 km from Kamikitadai
- Platforms: 2 side platforms
- Tracks: 2
- Connections: Bus stop

Construction
- Structure type: Elevated

Other information
- Station code: TT14
- Website: www.tama-monorail.co.jp/monorail/station/tachihi/index.html

History
- Opened: 27 November 1998

Passengers
- FY2013: 1,396 daily

Services
Preceding station	Tokyo Tama Intercity Monorail	Following station
Takamatsu (TT-13) towards Tama-Center	Tama Toshi Monorail Line	Izumi-Taiikukan (TT-15) towards Kamikitadai
Location
- Location within Japan

Tachihi Station (立飛駅, Tachihi-eki) is a station on the Tama Toshi Monorail Line in Tachikawa, Tokyo, Japan. It opened on November 27, 1998.

== Lines ==
Tachihi Station is a station on the Tama Toshi Monorail Line, and is located 3.6 km from the northern terminus of the line at Kamikitadai Station.

== Station layout ==
Tachihi Station is a raised station with two tracks and two opposed side platforms, with the station building located underneath.

=== Platforms ===
1	■ Tama Toshi Monorail Line	for Tamagawa-Jōsui and Kamikitadai
2	■ Tama Toshi Monorail Line	for Tachikawa-Kita and Tama-Center

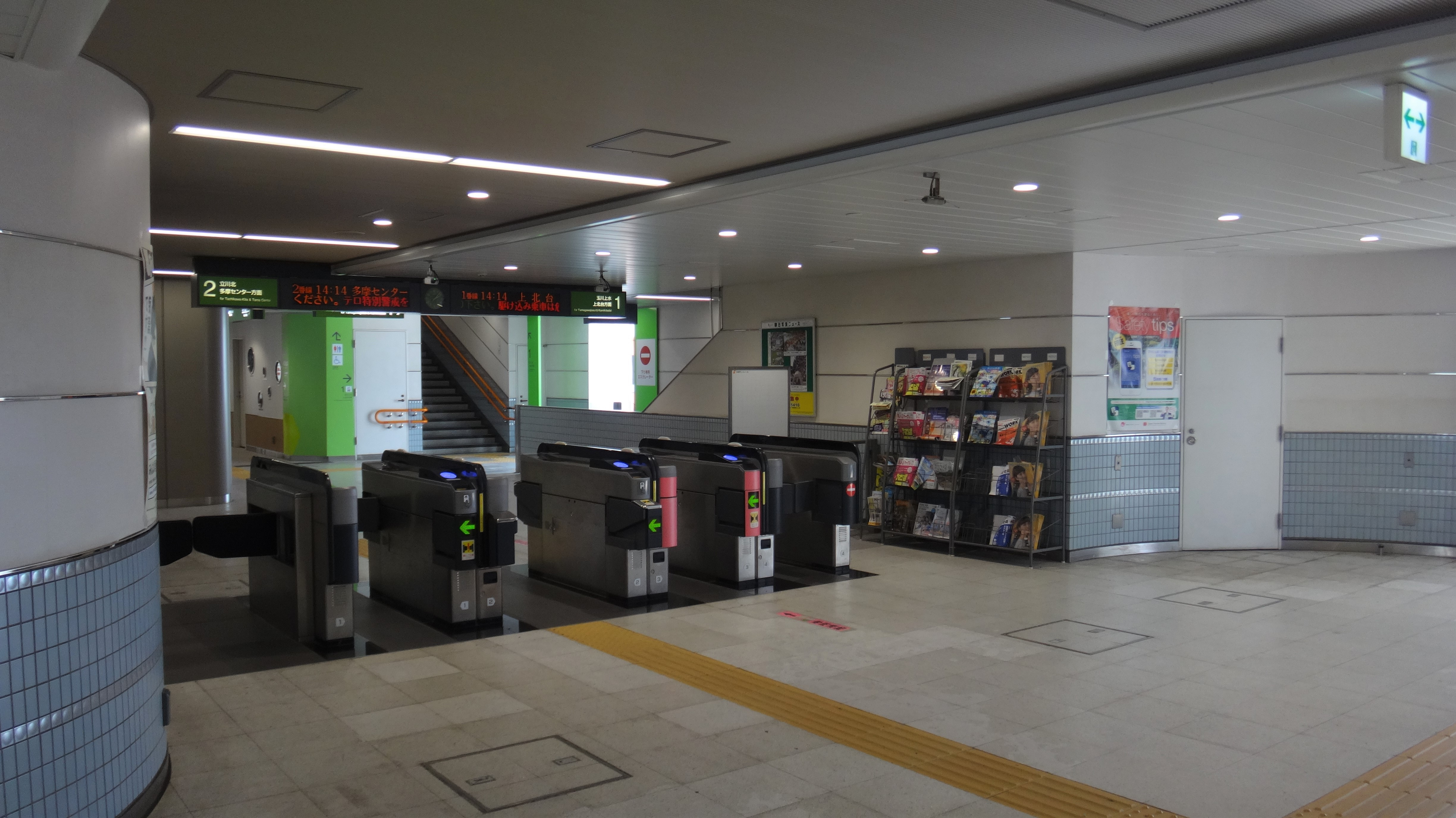
The north end ticket barriers in August 2016

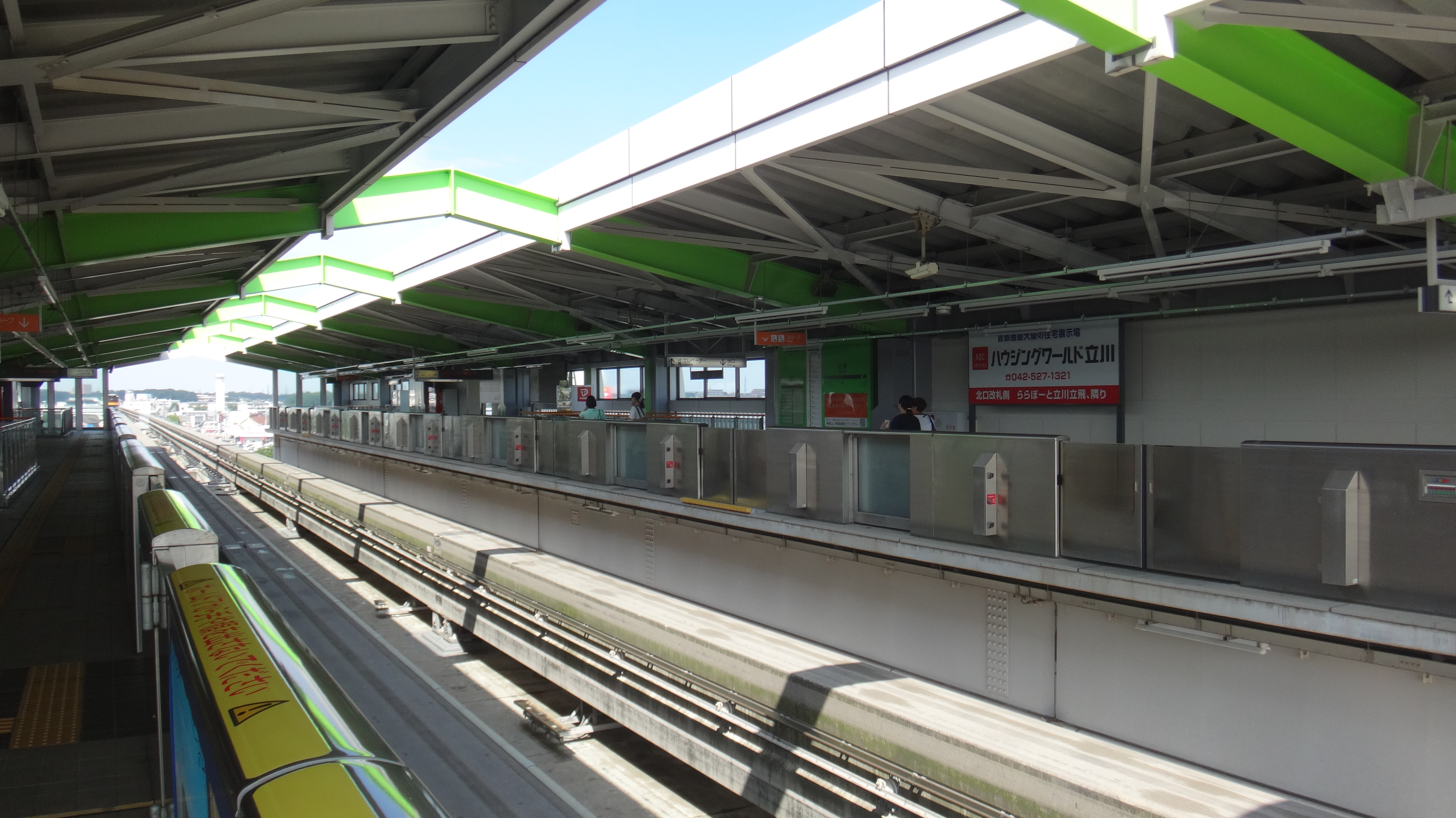
The platforms in August 2016

== History ==
The station opened on 27 November 1998.

Station numbering was introduced in February 2018 with Tachihi being assigned TT14.

== Surrounding area ==
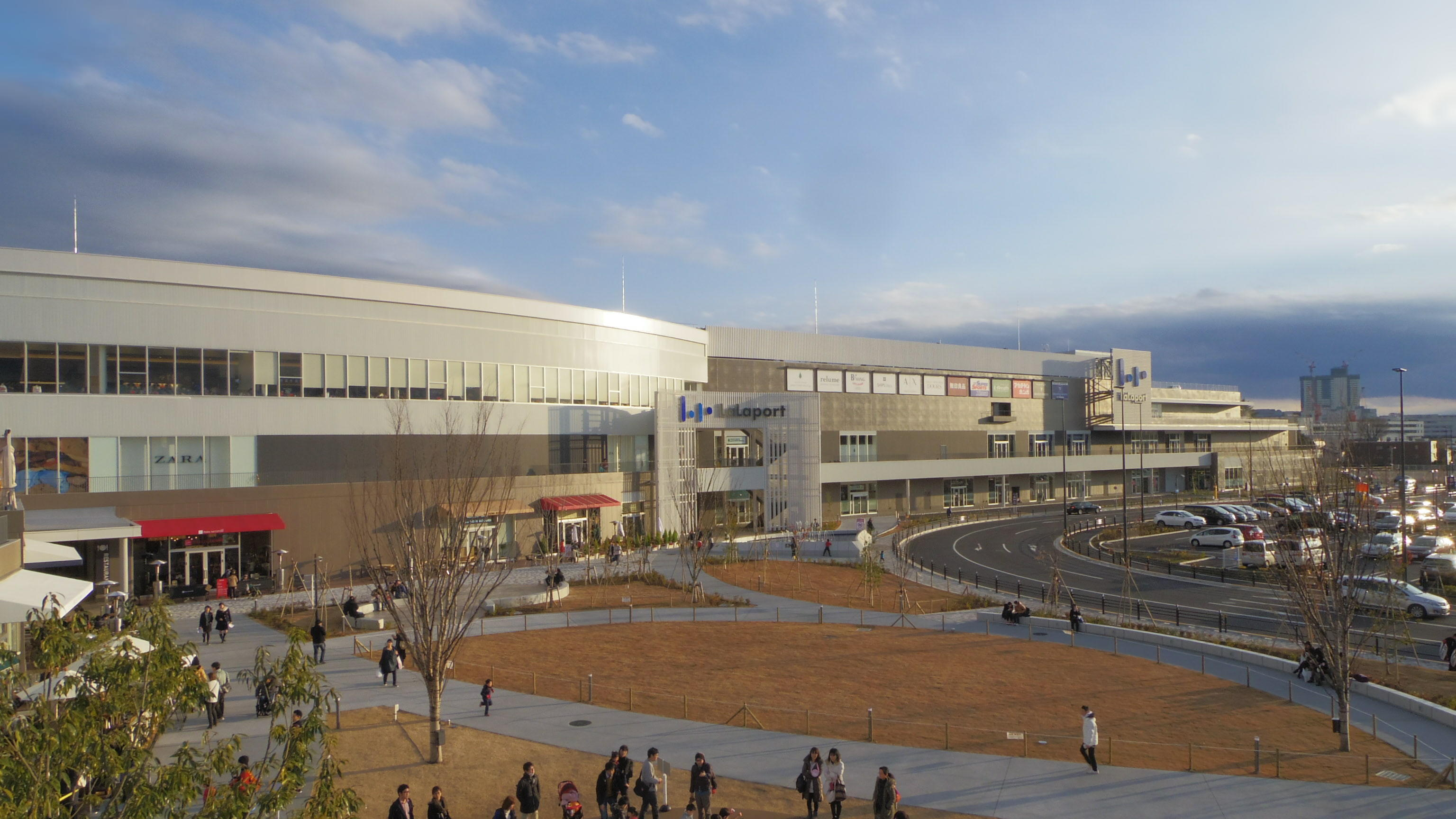
The Lalaport Tachikawa Tachihi shopping mall in December 2015

The station is situated above Tokyo Metropolitan Route 43 and adjoins the Lalaport Tachikawa Tachihi shopping mall. Other points of interest include:

- Arena Tachikawa Tachihi
- Tachihi Driving Range
- Shinnyo-en

== See also ==
- List of railway stations in Japan
