= Shibasaki-Taiikukan Station =

Monorail station in Tachikawa, Tokyo, Japan

Coordinates: 35°41′23″N 139°24′33″E

Shibasaki-Taiikukan Station 柴崎体育館駅
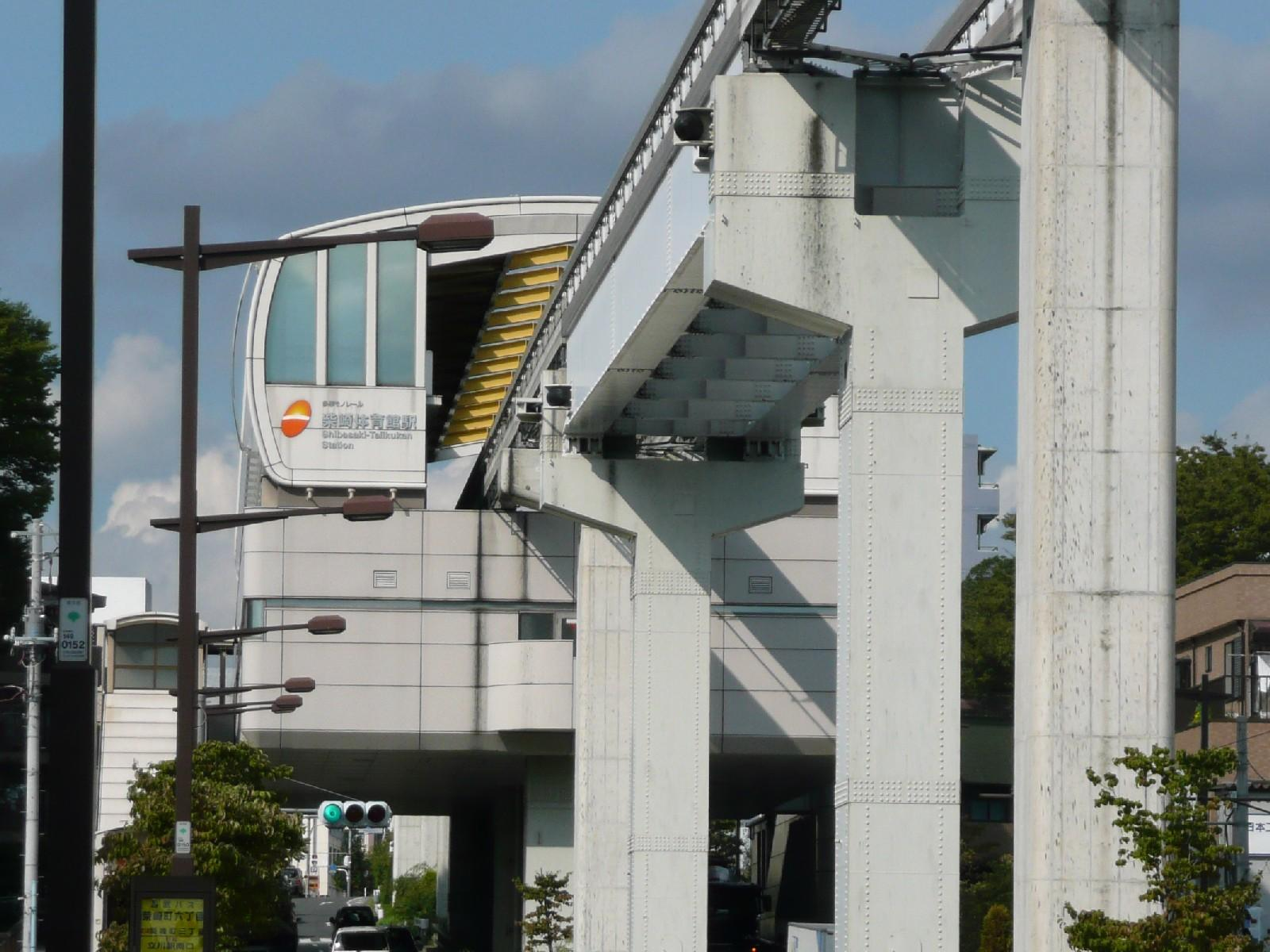
- Shibasaki-Taiikukan Station

General information
- Location: 6-107 Shibasaki-chō, Tachikawa-shi, Tokyo （東京都立川市柴崎町6-107） Japan
- Operator: Tokyo Tama Intercity Monorail
- Line: ■ Tama Toshi Monorail Line
- Platforms: 2 side platforms
- Connections: Bus stop

Other information
- Station code: TT10

History
- Opened: 10 January 2000

Passengers
- FY2013: 1,945

Services
Preceding station	Tokyo Tama Intercity Monorail	Following station
Kōshū-Kaidō (TT-09) towards Tama-Center	Tama Toshi Monorail Line	Tachikawa-Minami (TT-11) towards Kamikitadai
Location

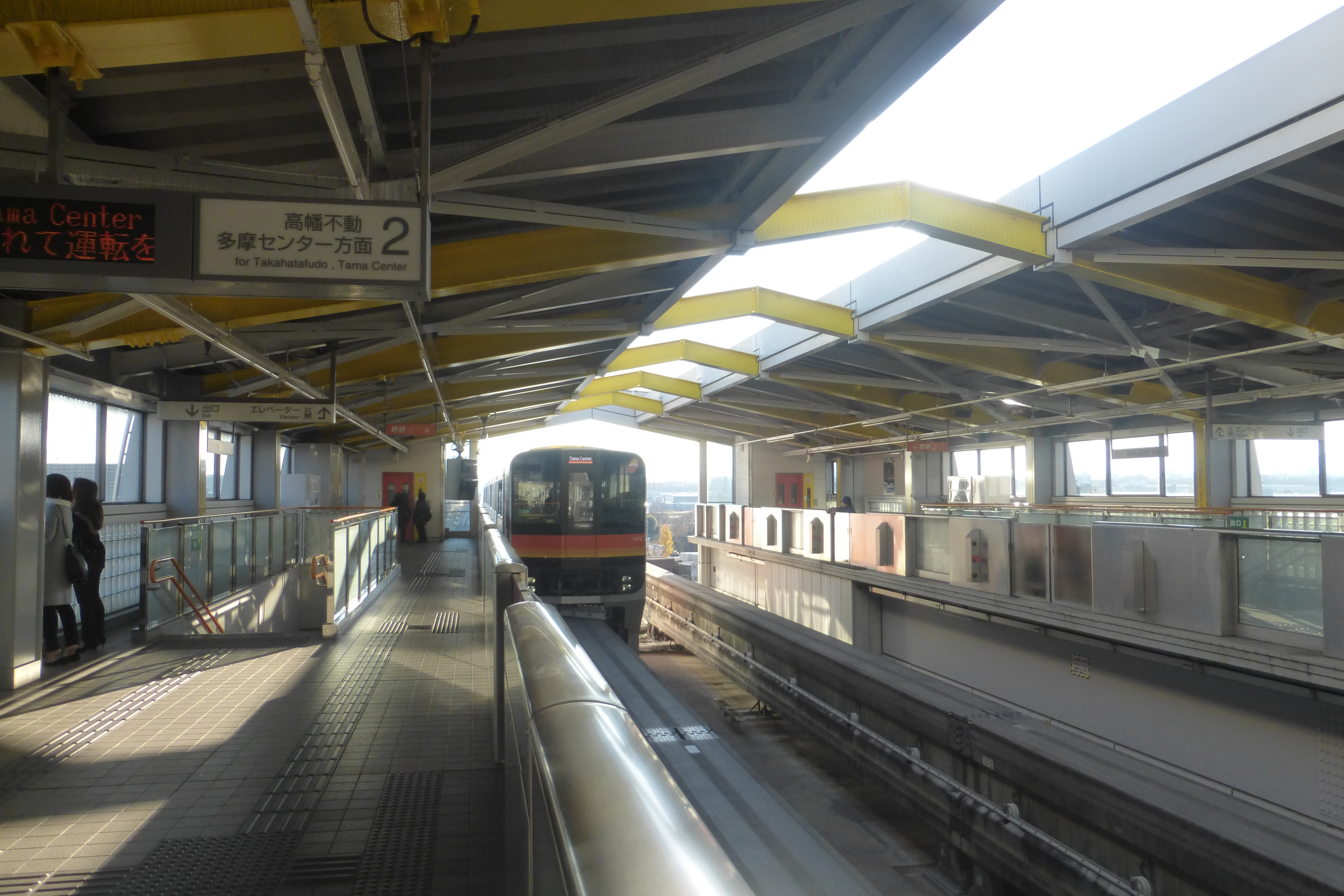
Station platforms, 2016

Shibasaki-Taiikukan Station (柴崎体育館駅, Shibasaki-taiikukan-eki) is a station on the Tama Toshi Monorail Line in Tachikawa, Tokyo, Japan.

== Lines ==
Shibasaki-Taiikukan Station is a station on the Tama Toshi Monorail Line and is located 6.5 kilometers from the terminus of the line at Kamikitadai Station.

== Station layout ==
Shibasaki-Taiikukan Station is a raised station with two tracks and two opposed side platforms, with the station building located underneath. It is a standardized station building for this monorail line.

=== Platforms ===
1	■ Tama Toshi Monorail Line	Tachikawa-Kita, Tamagawa-Jōsui, Kamikitadai
2	■ Tama Toshi Monorail Line	Takahatafudō, Tama-Center

== History ==
The station opened on 10 January 2000.

Station numbering was introduced in February 2018 with Shibasaki-Taiikukan being assigned TT10.

== Surrounding area ==
The station is above Tokyo Metropolitan Route 149. Tachikawa Municipal Shibasaki Gymnasium is nearby, as is the Tama River.
