= Manganji Station =

Monorail station in Hino, Tokyo, Japan

Coordinates: 35°40′16″N 139°25′12″E

Manganji Station 万願寺駅
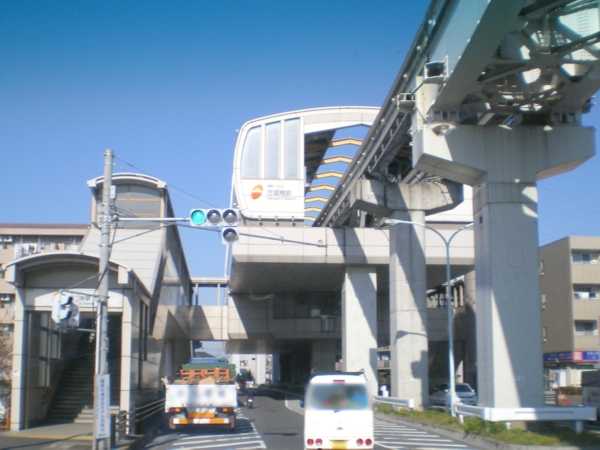
- Manganji Station

General information
- Location: 124 Arai, Hino-shi, Tokyo （東京都日野市新井124番地先） Japan
- Operator: Tokyo Tama Intercity Monorail
- Line: ■ Tama Toshi Monorail Line
- Platforms: 2 side platforms
- Connections: Bus stop

Other information
- Station code: TT08

History
- Opened: 10 January 2000

Passengers
- FY2013: 3,800 daily

Services
Preceding station	Tokyo Tama Intercity Monorail	Following station
Takahatafudō (TT-07) towards Tama-Center	Tama Toshi Monorail Line	Kōshū-Kaidō (TT-09) towards Kamikitadai
Location

Manganji Station (万願寺駅, Manganji-eki) is a station on the Tama Toshi Monorail Line in Hino, Tokyo, Japan.

== Lines ==
Manganji Station is a station on the Tama Toshi Monorail Line and is located 9.3 kilometers from the terminus of the line at Kamikitadai Station.

== Station layout ==
Manganji Station is a raised station with two tracks and two opposed side platforms, with the station building located underneath. It is a standardized station building for this monorail line.

=== Platforms ===
1	■ Tama Toshi Monorail Line	Tachikawa-Kita, Tamagawa-Jōsui, Kamikitadai
2	■ Tama Toshi Monorail Line	Takahatafudō, Tama-Center

== History ==
The station opened on 10 January 2000.

Station numbering was introduced in February 2018 with Manganji being assigned TT08.

== Surrounding area ==
The station is above Tokyo Metropolitan Route 503 at its intersection with National Route 20 (Hino Bypass). Atagosan Sekidenji, the birthplace and gravesite of the former deputy leader of the Shinsengumi, Hijikata Toshizō, is located nearby. Other points of interest include:

- Tokyo Bureau of Sewerage Asagawa Water Reclamation Center
- Hino City Clean Center
- Tokyo Metropolitan Hino Senior High School
- Sekiden Bridge
- Hino Tax Office
