= Hodokubo Station =

Monorail station in Hino, Tokyo, Japan

Coordinates: 35°39′19″N 139°24′39″E

Hodokubo Station 程久保駅
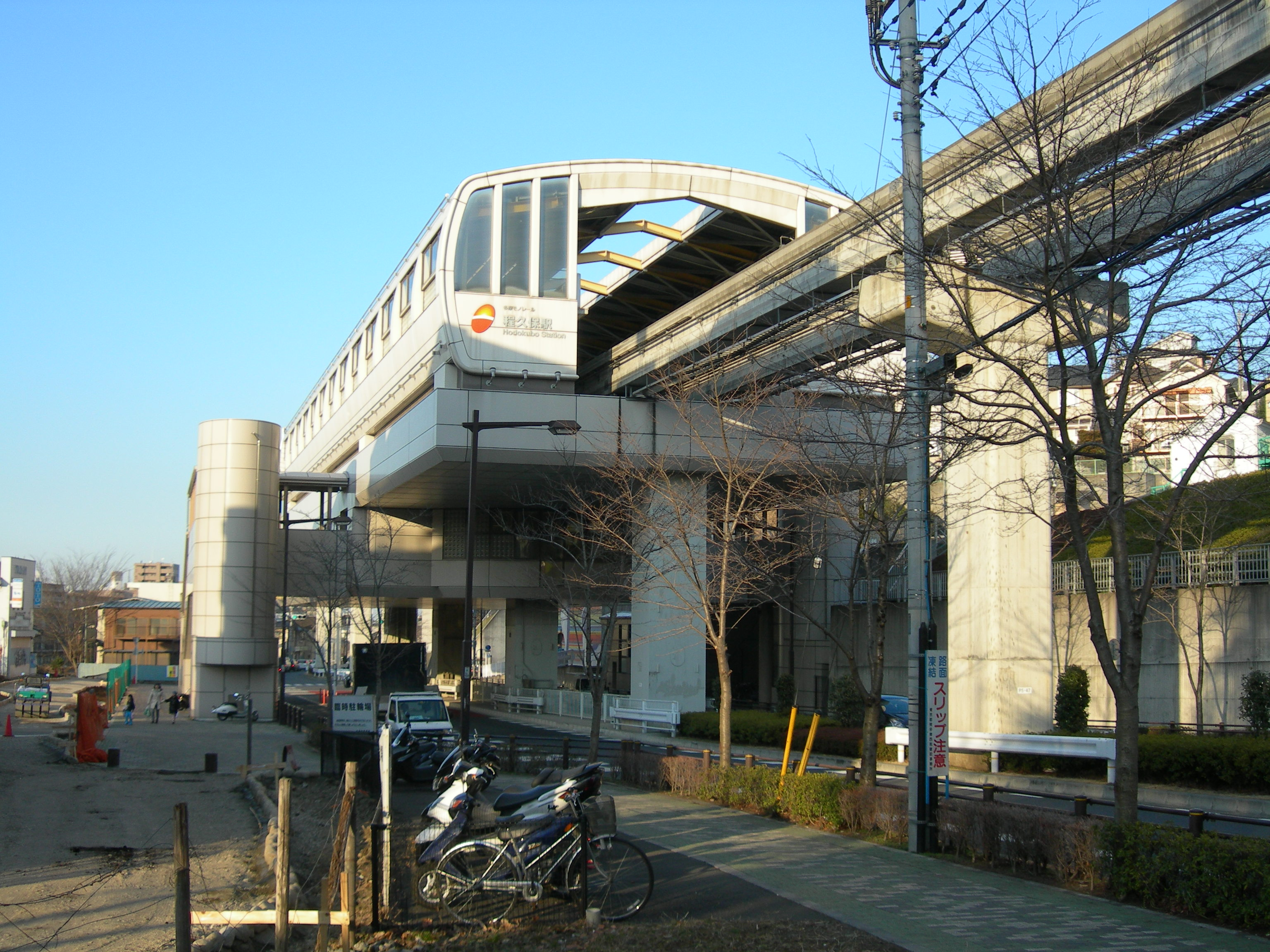
- Hodokubo Station

General information
- Location: 8-1 Hodokubo, Hino-shi, Tokyo （東京都日野市程久保八丁目1） Japan
- Operator: Tokyo Tama Intercity Monorail
- Line: ■ Tama Toshi Monorail Line
- Platforms: 2 side platforms
- Connections: Bus stop

Other information
- Station code: TT06

History
- Opened: 10 January 2000

Passengers
- FY2013: 820 daily

Services
Preceding station	Tokyo Tama Intercity Monorail	Following station
Tama-Dōbutsukōen (TT-05) towards Tama-Center	Tama Toshi Monorail Line	Takahatafudō (TT-07) towards Kamikitadai
Location

Hodokubo Station (程久保駅, Hodokubo-eki) is a station on the Tama Toshi Monorail Line in Hino, Tokyo, Japan.

== Lines ==
Hodokubo Station is a station on the Tama Toshi Monorail Line and is located 11.3 kilometers from the terminus of the line at Kamikitadai Station.

== Station layout ==
Hodokubo Station is a raised station with two tracks and two opposed side platforms, with the station building located underneath. It is a standardized station building for this monorail line.

=== Platforms ===
1	■ Tama Toshi Monorail Line	Takahatafudo, Tachikawa-Kita, Tamagawa-Jōsui, Kamikitadai
2	■ Tama Toshi Monorail Line	Tama-Center

== History ==
The station opened on 10 January 2000.

Station numbering was introduced in February 2018 with Hodokubo being assigned TT06.

== Surrounding area ==
The station is above Tokyo Metropolitan Route 503 as it parallels the Keiō Dōbutsuen Line. The area is primarily residential. Other points of interest include:

- Hino City Yumegaoka Elementary School
- Hino Takahatadai Post Office
- Hino City Furusato Museum
