= Takamatsu Station (Tokyo) =

Monorail station in Tachikawa, Tokyo, Japan

Coordinates: 35°42′36″N 139°24′48″E

Takamatsu Station 高松駅
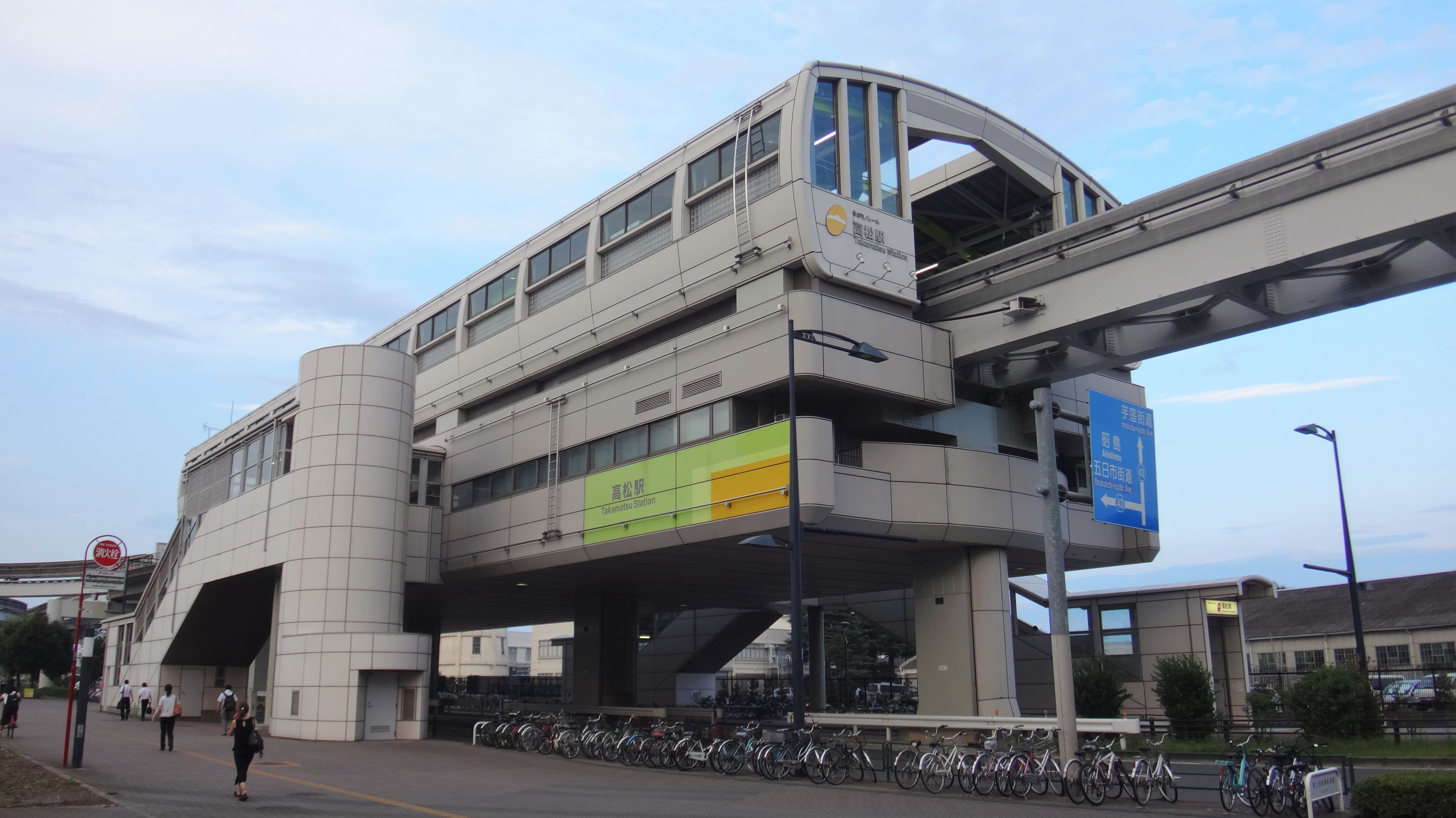
- Takamatsu Station in August 2016

General information
- Location: 1-100 Takamatsu-chō, Tachikawa-shi, Tokyo 190-0011; Japan
- Operator: Tokyo Tama Intercity Monorail
- Line: ■ Tama Toshi Monorail Line
- Distance: 4.2 km from Kamikitadai
- Platforms: 2 side platforms
- Tracks: 2
- Connections: Bus stop

Construction
- Structure type: Elevated

Other information
- Station code: TT13
- Website: www.tama-monorail.co.jp/monorail/station/takamatsu/index.html

History
- Opened: 27 November 1998

Passengers
- FY2013: 3,527 daily

Services
Preceding station	Tokyo Tama Intercity Monorail	Following station
Tachikawa-Kita (TT-12) towards Tama-Center	Tama Toshi Monorail Line	Tachihi (TT-14) towards Kamikitadai
Location
- Location within Japan

Takamatsu Station (高松駅, Takamatsu-eki) is a station on the Tama Toshi Monorail Line in Tachikawa, Tokyo, Japan.

== Lines ==
Takamatsu Station is served by the Tama Toshi Monorail Line, and is located 4.2 kilometers from the northern terminus of the line at Kamikitadai Station.

== Station layout ==
Takamatsu Station is a raised station with two tracks and two opposed side platforms, with the station building located underneath.

=== Platforms ===
1	■ Tama Toshi Monorail Line	for Tamagawa-Jōsui and Kamikitadai
2	■ Tama Toshi Monorail Line	for Tachikawa-Kita and Tama-Center

== History ==
The station opened on November 27, 1998.

Station numbering was introduced in February 2018 with Takamatsu being assigned TT13.

== Surrounding area ==
The station is above Tokyo Metropolitan Route 43 and is surrounded by warehouses and a driving range. Northwest of the station lies the Tama Toshi Monorail's maintenance facility and railyard, as well as the company headquarters. Other points of interest include:

- Showa Memorial Park
- National Institute for Japanese Language and Linguistics
- National Institute of Japanese Literature
- Institute of Statistical Mathematics
- National Institute of Polar Research
- Tokyo District Court Tachikawa Branch Court
- Tachikawa Second Judicial Building
- Local Autonomy College
- National Hospital Organization Disaster Medical Center
- Tachikawa Police Station

== See also ==
- List of railway stations in Japan
