= Chūō-Daigaku-Meisei-Daigaku Station =

Monorail station in Hachiiōji, Tokyo, Japan

Coordinates: 35°38′31″N 139°24′31″E

Chūō-Daigaku-Meisei-Daigaku Station 中央大学・明星大学駅
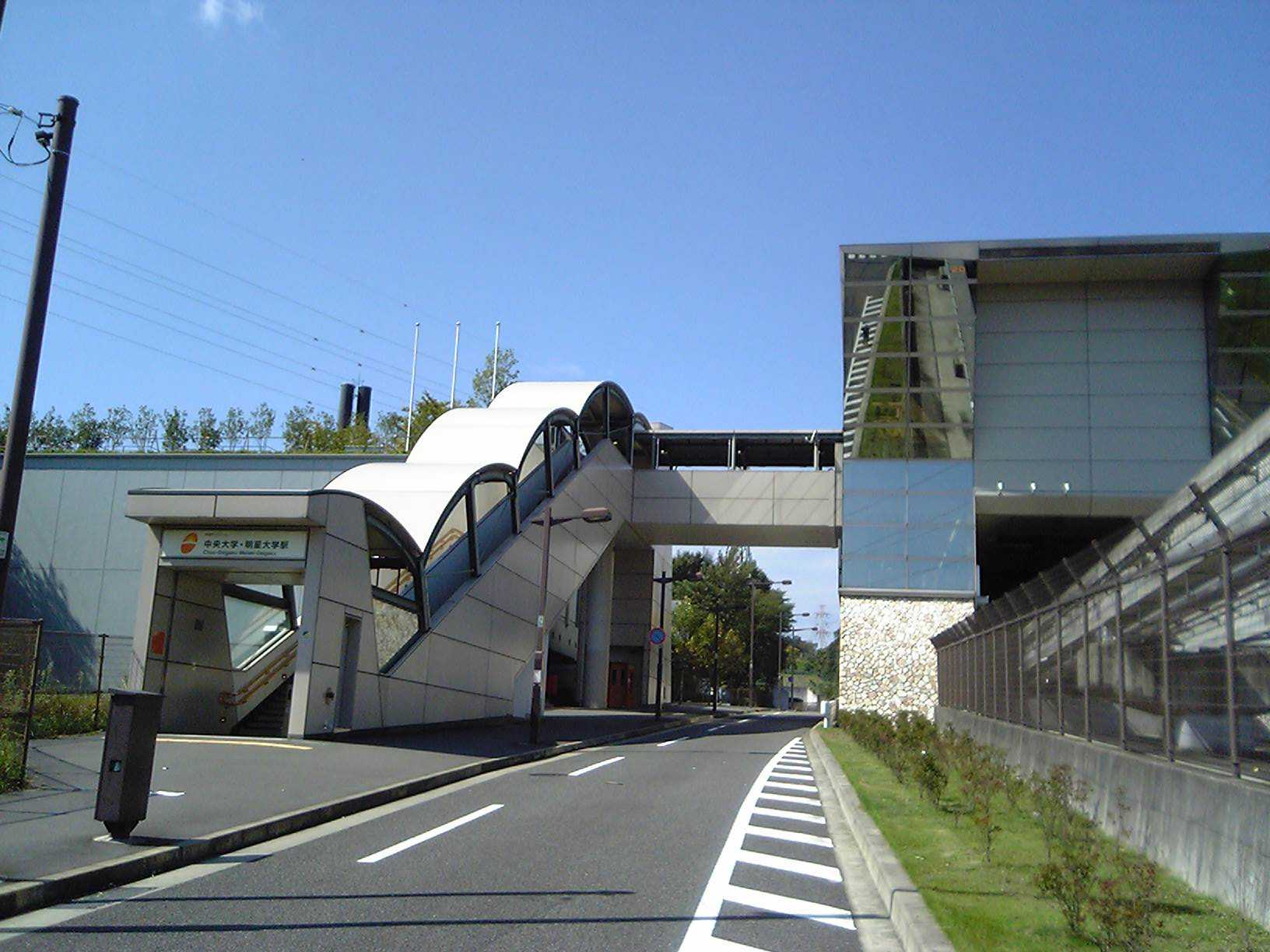
- Chūō-Daigaku-Meisei-Daigaku Station

General information
- Location: 742 Higashi-Nakano, Hachiōji-shi, Tokyo （東京都八王子市東中野742） Japan
- Operator: Tokyo Tama Intercity Monorail
- Line: ■ Tama Toshi Monorail Line
- Platforms: 2 side platforms Tama
- Connections: Bus stop

Other information
- Station code: TT04

History
- Opened: 10 January 2000

Passengers
- FY2013: 15,876 daily

Services
Preceding station	Tokyo Tama Intercity Monorail	Following station
Ōtsuka Teikyo-Daigaku (TT-03) towards Tama-Center	Tama Toshi Monorail Line	Tama-Dōbutsukōen (TT-05) towards Kamikitadai
Location

Chūō-Daigaku-Meisei-Daigaku Station (中央大学・明星大学駅, Chūō-daigaku-meisei-daigaku-eki) is a station on the Tama Toshi Monorail Line in Hachiōji, Tokyo, Japan.

== Lines ==
Chūō-Daigaku-Meisei-Daigaku Station is a station on the Tama Toshi Monorail Line and is located 13.4 kilometers from the terminus of the line at Kamikitadai Station.

== Station layout ==
Chūō-Daigaku-Meisei-Daigaku Station is an above-ground station with two tracks and two side platforms. Unusually for the Tama Monorail Line, the station is not elevated.

=== Platforms ===
1	■ Tama Toshi Monorail Line	Takahatafudo, Tachikawa-Kita, Tamagawa-Jōsui, Kamikitadai
2	■ Tama Toshi Monorail Line	Tama-Center

== History ==
The station opened on 10 January 2000.

Station numbering was introduced in February 2018 with Chūō-Daigaku-Meisei-Daigaku being assigned TT04.

== Surrounding area ==
The station is between two major university campuses: the Tama campus of Chūō University and the Hino campus of Meisei University. As such, the station concourse often becomes crowded with students heading to and from the universities, sometimes more than the station can handle. Other points of interest include:

- Tokyo Metropolitan Route 156
