= Sunagawa-Nanaban Station =

Monorail station in Tachikawa, Tokyo, Japan

Coordinates: 35°43′24″N 139°25′05″E

Sunagawa-Nanaban Station 砂川七番駅
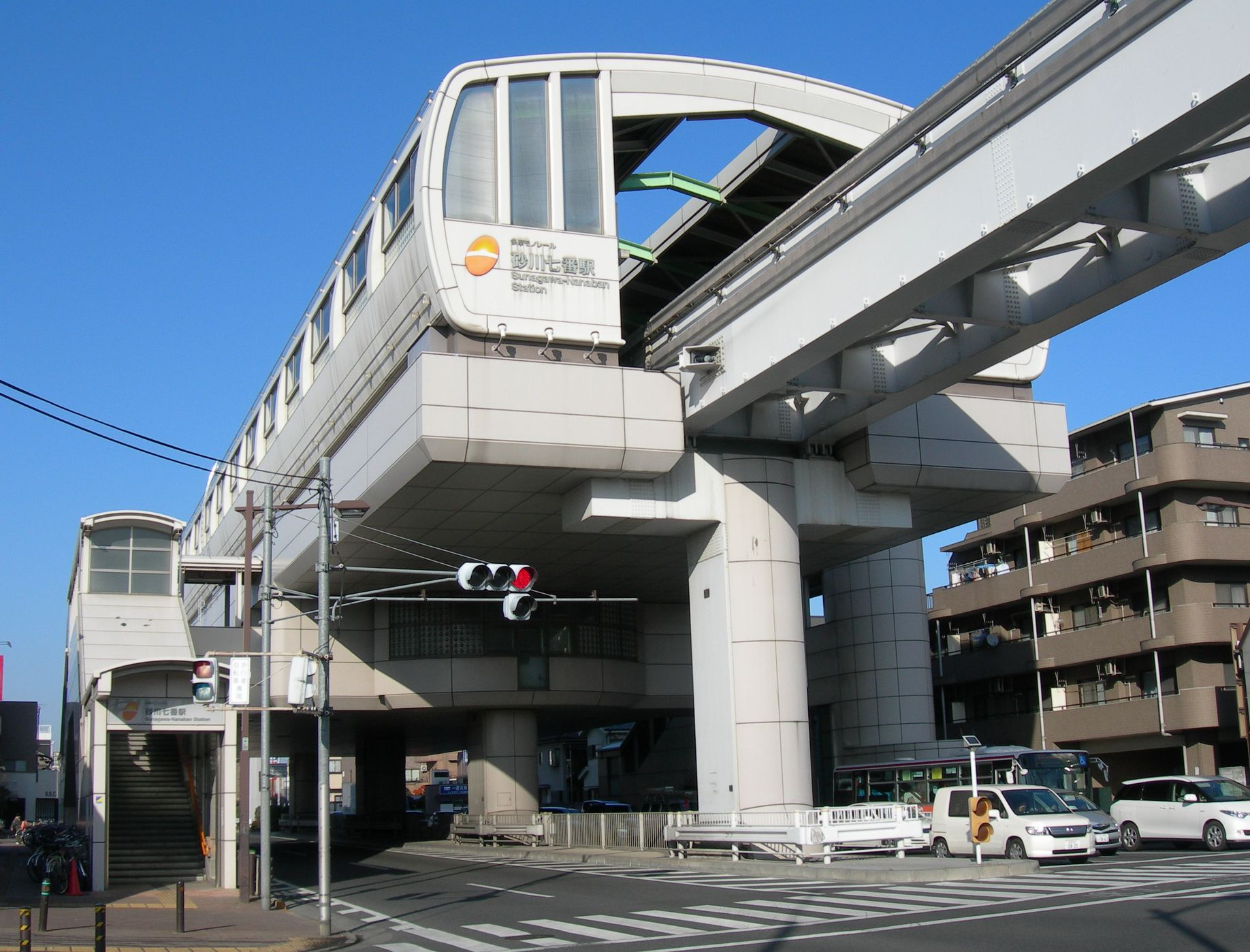
- Sunagawa-Nanaban Station

General information
- Location: 3-1 Kashiwa-cho, Tachikawa-shi, Tokyo （東京都立川市柏町三丁目1 ） Japan
- Operator: Tokyo Tama Intercity Monorail
- Line: ■ Tama Toshi Monorail Line
- Platforms: 2 side platforms
- Connections: Bus stop

Other information
- Station code: TT16

History
- Opened: 27 November 1998

Passengers
- FY2013: 2,282 daily

Services
Preceding station	Tokyo Tama Intercity Monorail	Following station
Izumi-Taiikukan (TT-15) towards Tama-Center	Tama Toshi Monorail Line	Tamagawa-Jōsui (TT-17) towards Kamikitadai
Location

Sunagawa-Nanaban Station (砂川七番駅, Sunagawa-nanaban-eki) is a station on the Tama Toshi Monorail Line in Tachikawa, Tokyo, Japan.

== Lines ==
Sunagawa-Nanaban Station is a station on the Tama Toshi Monorail Line and is located 2.5 kilometers from the terminus of the line at Kamikitadai Station.

== Station layout ==
Sunagawa-Nanaban Station is a raised station with two tracks and two opposed side platforms, with the station building located underneath. It is a standardized station building for this monorail line.

=== Platforms ===
1	■ Tama Toshi Monorail Line	Tamagawa-Jōsui, Kamikitadai
2	■ Tama Toshi Monorail Line	Tachikawa-Kita, Takahatafudō, Tama-Center

== History ==
The station opened on 27 November 1998.

Station numbering was introduced in February 2018 with Sunagawa-Nanaban being assigned TT16.

== Surrounding area ==
The station is above Tokyo Metropolitan Route 43 (Imokubo Kaidō) at its intersection with Tokyo Metropolitan Route 7 (Itsukaichi Kaidō). The surrounding area is an older residential area, but apartment buildings and shops have begun appearing since the opening of the station. Other points of interest include:

- Tachikawa City Library, Saiwai Branch
- Kobushi Kaikan
- Tachikawa Kominkaen
