= Ōtsuka-Teikyō-Daigaku Station =

Monorail station in Hachiiōji, Tokyo, Japan

Coordinates: 35°38′13″N 139°24′59″E

Ōtsuka-Teikyō-Daigaku Station 大塚・帝京大学駅
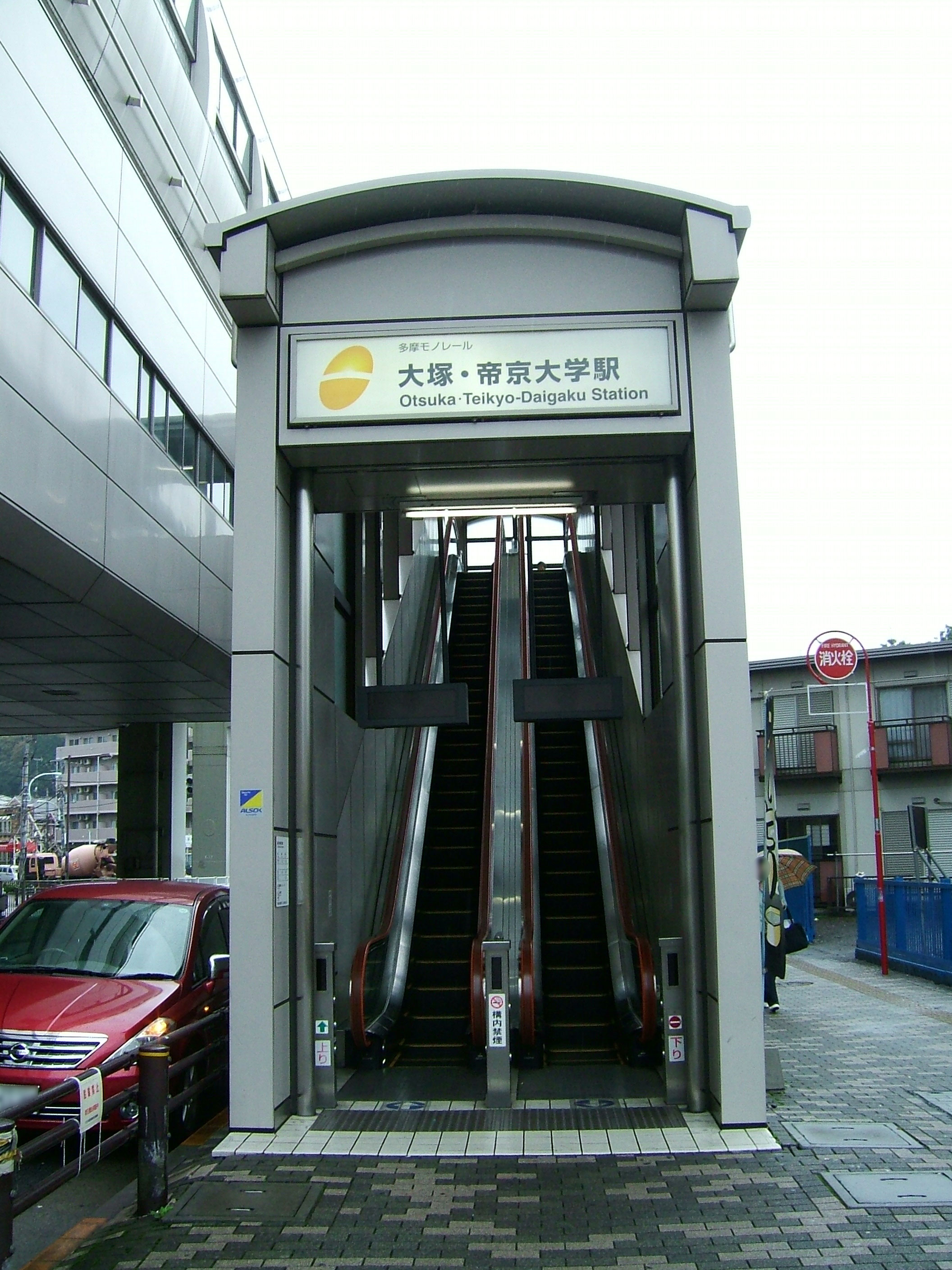
- Ōtsuka-Teikyō-Daigaku Station

General information
- Location: 1473 Ōtsuka, Hachiōji-shi, Tokyo （東京都八王子市大塚1473 ） Japan
- Operator: Tokyo Tama Intercity Monorail
- Line: ■ Tama Toshi Monorail Line
- Platforms: 2 side platforms
- Connections: Bus stop

Other information
- Station code: TT03

History
- Opened: 10 January 2000

Passengers
- FY2013: 3,751 daily

Services
Preceding station	Tokyo Tama Intercity Monorail	Following station
Matsugaya (TT-02) towards Tama-Center	Tama Toshi Monorail Line	Chūō-Daigaku-Meisei-Daigaku (TT-04) towards Kamikitadai
Location

Ōtsuka-Teikyō-Daigaku Station (大塚・帝京大学駅, Ōtsuka-teikyō-daigaku-eki) is a station on the Tama Toshi Monorail Line in Hachiōji, Tokyo, Japan.

== Lines ==
Ōtsuka-Teikyō-Daigaku Station is a station on the Tama Toshi Monorail Line and is located 14.3 kilometers from the terminus of the line at Kamikitadai Station.

== Station layout ==
Ōtsuka-Teikyō-Daigaku Station is a raised station with two tracks and two opposed side platforms, with the station building located underneath. It is a standardized station building for this monorail line.

=== Platforms ===
1	■ Tama Toshi Monorail Line	Takahatafudo, Tachikawa-Kita, Tamagawa-Jōsui, Kamikitadai
2	■ Tama Toshi Monorail Line	Tama-Center

== History ==
The station opened on 10 January 2000.

Station numbering was introduced in February 2018 with Ōtsuka-Teikyō-Daigaku being assigned TT03.

== Surrounding area ==
The station serves the nearby Ōtsuka campus of Teikyō University, though it is approximately a kilometer away. Other points of interest include:

- Ōtsuka-Teikyō-Daigaku-Mae Post Office
- OK Store supermarket, Tama-Ōtsuka branch
- Yaen-Kaidō (Tokyo Metropolitan Route 20)
- Festa Resort Yaen hotel (the former "Hotel Yaen" love hotel)
