= Tachikawa-Minami Station =

Monorail station in Tachikawa, Tokyo, Japan

Coordinates: 35°41′46″N 139°24′45″E

Tachikawa-Minami Station 立川南駅
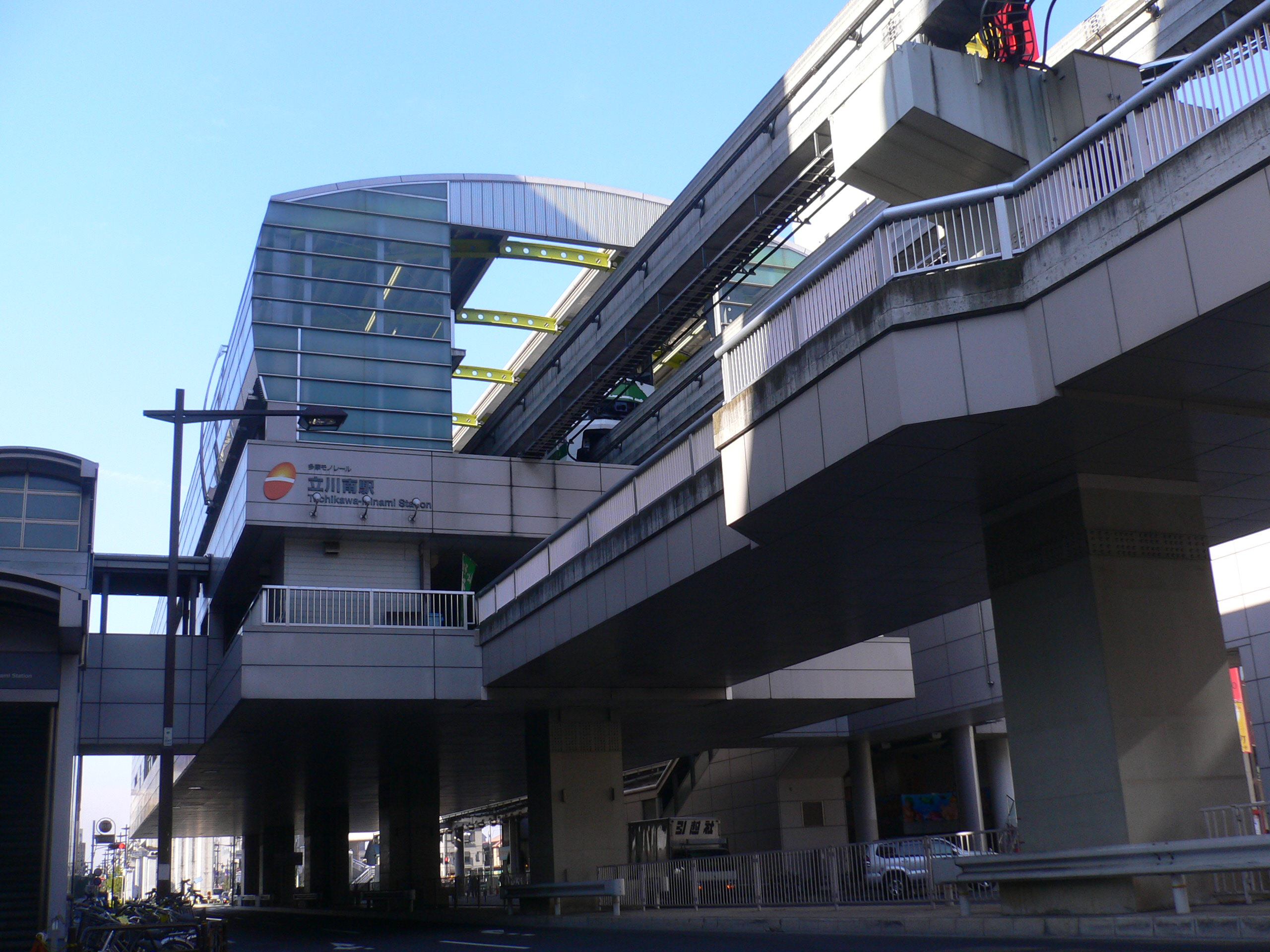
- Tachikawa-Minami Station

General information
- Location: 3-7 Shibasaki-chō, Tachikawa-sho, Tokyo （東京都立川市柴崎町3丁目7） Japan
- Operator: Tokyo Tama Intercity Monorail
- Line: ■ Tama Toshi Monorail Line
- Platforms: 2 side platforms
- Connections: Bus terminal

Other information
- Station code: TT11

History
- Opened: 10 January 2000

Passengers
- FY2013: 15,056 daily

Services
Preceding station	Tokyo Tama Intercity Monorail	Following station
Shibasaki-Taiikukan (TT-10) towards Tama-Center	Tama Toshi Monorail Line	Tachikawa-Kita (TT-12) towards Kamikitadai
Location

Tachikawa-Minami Station (立川南駅, Tachikawa-minami-eki) is a station on the Tama Toshi Monorail Line in Tachikawa, Tokyo, Japan.

== Lines ==
Tachikawa-Minami Station is a station on the Tama Toshi Monorail Line and is located 5.8 kilometers from the terminus of the line at Kamikitadai Station.

== Station layout ==
Tachikawa-Minami Station is a raised station with two tracks and two opposed side platforms, with the station building located underneath. It is a standardized station building for this monorail line.

=== Platforms ===
1	■ Tama Toshi Monorail Line	Tachikawa-Kita, Tamagawa-Jōsui, Kamikitadai
2	■ Tama Toshi Monorail Line	Takahatafudō, Tama-Center

== History ==
The station opened on 10 January 2000.

Station numbering was introduced in February 2018 with Tachikawa-Minami being assigned TT11.

== Surrounding area ==
The station is above Tokyo Metropolitan Route 149 south of JR Tachikawa Station. Both stations (and Tachikawa-Kita Station) are connected via a pedestrian walkway. Other points of interest include:

- Granduo (Tachikawa Station Building)
- AREAREA (shopping center)
- Tokyo Metropolitan Tama Cultural Center and Library
