= Matsugaya Station =

Monorail station in Hachiiōji, Tokyo, Japan

Coordinates: 35°37′55″N 139°25′20″E

Matsugaya Station 松が谷駅
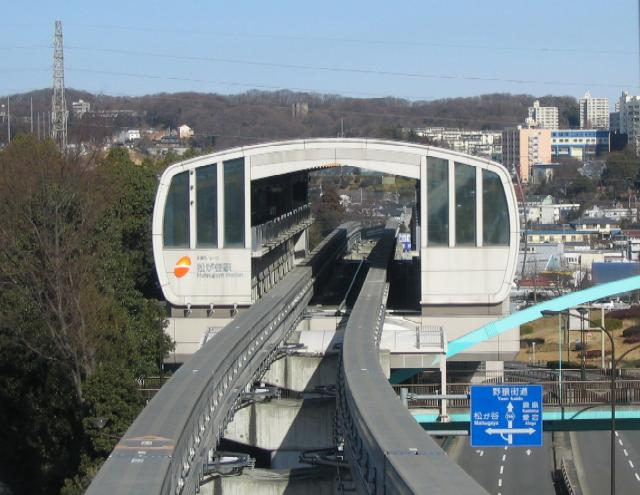
- Matsugaya Station

General information
- Location: 40 Matsugaya, Hachiōji-shi, Tokyo （東京都八王子市松が谷40） Japan
- Operator: Tokyo Tama Intercity Monorail
- Line: ■ Tama Toshi Monorail Line
- Platforms: 2 side platforms
- Connections: Bus stop

Other information
- Station code: TT02

History
- Opened: 10 January 2000

Passengers
- FY2013: 1,260 daily

Services
| Preceding station | Tokyo Tama Intercity Monorail | Following station |
|---|---|---|
| Tama-Center (TT-01) Terminus | Tama Toshi Monorail Line | Ōtsuka Teikyo-Daigaku (TT-03) towards Kamikitadai |
Location

Matsugaya Station (松が谷駅, Matsugaya-eki) is a station on the Tama Toshi Monorail Line in Hachiōji, Tokyo, Japan.

== Lines ==
Matsugaya Station is a station on the Tama Toshi Monorail Line and is located 15.1 kilometers from the terminus of the line at Kamikitadai Station.

== Station layout ==
Matsugaya Station is a raised station with two tracks and two opposed side platforms, with the station building located underneath. It is a standardized station building for this monorail line. Each platform is equipped with one elevator and one escalator which connect the platform level and the concourse level; the concourse is connected via a pedestrian deck to ground level (which, unusually for a raised station, is level with the concourse). The station is generally unattended and is monitored remotely via surveillance cameras.

=== Platforms ===
| 1 | ■ Tama Toshi Monorail Line | Takahatafudo, Tachikawa-Kita, Tamagawa-Jōsui, Kamikitadai |
| 2 | ■ Tama Toshi Monorail Line | Tama-Center |

== History ==
The station opened on 10 January 2000.

Station numbering was introduced in February 2018 with Matsugaya being assigned TT02.

== Surrounding area ==
The station serves the Kashima and Matsugaya areas of Tama New Town, running above Tokyo Metropolitan Route 156. There are few shops or municipal facilities nearby, only homes and apartment buildings; the station surroundings are therefore very quiet. Two parks and several schools are also nearby.
