= Sakurakaidō Station =

Monorail station in Higashiyamato, Tokyo, Japan

Coordinates: 35°44′21″N 139°25′00″E

Sakurakaidō Station 桜街道駅
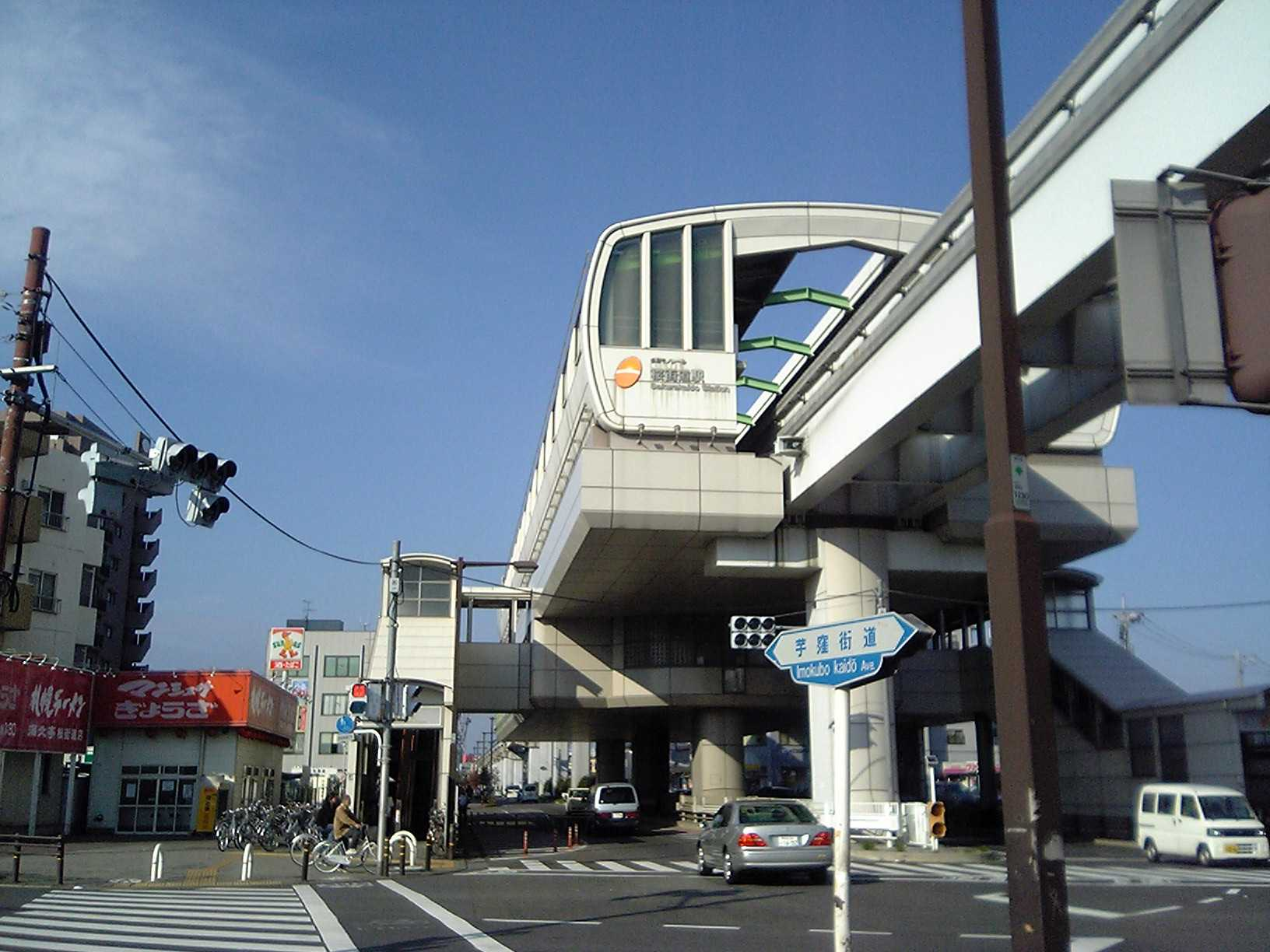
- Sakurakaidō Station

General information
- Location: 3-470 Kamikitadai, Higashiyamato-shi, Tokyobr />（東京都東大和市上北台三丁目470番） Japan
- Operator: Tokyo Tama Intercity Monorail
- Line: ■ Tama Toshi Monorail Line
- Platforms: 2 side platforms
- Connections: Bus stop

Other information
- Station code: TT18

History
- Opened: 27 November 1998

Passengers
- FY2013: 3,200 daily

Services
Preceding station	Tokyo Tama Intercity Monorail	Following station
Tamagawa-Jōsui (TT-17) towards Tama-Center	Tama Toshi Monorail Line	Kamikitadai (TT-19) Terminus
Location

Sakurakaidō Station (桜街道駅, Sakurakaidō-eki) is a monorail station operated by the Tokyo Tama Intercity Monorail Company in Higashiyamato, Tokyo, Japan.

== Lines ==
Sakurakaidō Station is a station on the Tama Toshi Monorail Line located 0.7 kilometers from the terminus of the line at Kamikitadai Station.

== Station layout ==
Sakurakaidō Station is a raised station with two tracks and two side platforms. It has a standardized station building for the monorail line.

=== Platforms ===
1	■ Tama Toshi Monorail Line	Kamikitadai
2	■ Tama Toshi Monorail Line	Tamagawa-Jōsui, Tachikawa-Kita, Takahatafudo, Tama-Center

== Surrounding area ==
The station is above Tokyo Metropolitan Route 43 (Imokubo-Kaidō). Other points of interest include:

- Morinaga Milk Industry, Tokyo Tama Plant / Yamato Plant
- Casio Hitachi Mobile Communications, Tokyo Plant
- Sakura Kaidō

== History ==
The station opened on 27 November 1998 with the opening of the line.

Station numbering was introduced in February 2018 with Sakurakaidō being assigned TT18.
