= Digital Hollywood University =

Private university in Chiyoda, Japan

- デジタルハリウッド大学
- Type: Private university
- Established: 1994
- Location: Chiyoda, Tokyo, Japan
- Campus: Akihabara Main Campus 35°41′57.1″N 139°46′19.5″E Second Campus 35°42′0.1″N 139°46′10.9″E Third Campus 35°42′0.3″N 139°46′26.4″E
- Website: http://www.dhw.ac.jp/

Digital Hollywood University (デジタルハリウッド大学, Dejitaru hariuddo daigaku) is a private university in Chiyoda, Tokyo, Japan. The predecessor of the school was founded in 1994, and it was chartered as a university on April 1, 2005 by Digital Hollywood Corporation, a school establishment corporation based on the Act on Special Districts for Structural Reform.

The school specializes in film, animation, and video game design, part of a growing number of such schools in Japan. It offers undergraduate programs in six basic fields of study: Anime, CG, Film, Web, Graphic Design, and IT Programming. The graduate and undergraduate programs are divided into smaller curricula specializing in areas such as business management, technical proficiency, arts and humanities, and international communication.

It is also known for being a prominent destination for studying abroad for students from all around the world. Most of the international students are from Asian countries such as China and Korea, but there is also a number of students studying at the school who hail from western nations in North America and Europe. As of 2010, international students make up 20% of student enrollment. The President of the university, Tomoyuki Sugiyama, has said he wishes to see that number raise to 50%.

Sugiyama claims that the mission of Digital Hollywood University is to embrace the growing worldwide popularity of Japanese media and entertainment, as well as the ever-increasing role of digital communication in today's society, and to give students the tools and knowledge to create a career for themselves in the digital media industry. According to Sugiyama, author of the book Cool Japan: Why the World is Buying into Japan, the nation should utilize its growing cultural popularity in the west when trying to build the future for Japan's economy.

Taro Aso, former Minister for Foreign Affairs in Japan, concurs with that sentiment. In a speech given at Digital Hollywood University, he noted the significance of the fact that consumption of western media has been a huge part of defining modern popular culture in Japan, and that this trend is now seemingly beginning to reverse, with Japanese media becoming more and more popular in China, Europe, and North America, and becoming a more prominent part of pop culture for the younger generations in those areas.

“We have all grown up nourished by Shakespeare and Beethoven and other forms of culture emerging from the West. Yet we are now at the point where culture made in Japan-whether anime and manga or sumo and Japanese food culture-is equally able to nourish the people of the world, particularly the younger generations. We would be remiss not to utilize these to the fullest.”

== Access ==
Students from Escape Studios in London studying at Digital Hollywood, Tokyo

All of the campuses are located within walking distance of Akihabara Station. The Akihabara Main Campus is located on the 3rd floor of the Ochanomizu Sola City Academia which is about a minute walk from JR Ochanomizu Station and a minute walk from Tokyo Metro Chiyoda Line Shin-Ochanomizu Station. It is also about a 5-minute walk from Ochanomizu Station on the Tokyo Metro Marunouchi Line.

The Second Campus is used as a production studio located at Hachiōji, Tokyo which is about a minute walk from Tama Monorail Matsugaya Station.

The ASEAN Bangkok office is located at central of Bangkok, Thailand which is about a minute walk from BTS Sukhumvit Line Ploenchit Station.
