= Daigaku Station (disambiguation) =

Daigaku Station is a railway station in Kawashimo-cho, Sasebo City, Nagasaki Prefecture, Japan.

Other stations with "Daigaku" in the name include:

- Beppu Daigaku Station, a railway station on the Nippō Main Line in Beppu, Oita, Japan
- Chūō-Daigaku-Meisei-Daigaku Station, a railway station on the Tama Toshi Monorail Line in Hachiōji, Tokyo, Japan
- Daigaku-mae Station (Shiga), a railway station in Higashiōmi, Shiga, Japan
- Daigaku-mae Station, one of the former names of Kandai-mae Station, a train station on the Hankyu Railway Senri Line located in Suita, Osaka Prefecture, Japan
- Daigaku-mae Station or Hiroshima-Daigaku-mae Station, former names of Nisseki-byoin-mae Station, a tram station in Naka-ku, Hiroshima, Hiroshima Prefecture, Japan
- Gakugei-daigaku Station, an elevated railway station in Meguro, Tokyo, Japan
- Kenritsudaigaku Station, a railway station in Yokosuka, Kanagawa Prefecture, Japan
- Kitasato-Daigaku-mae Station, a former railway station on the Towada Kankō Electric Railway Line in Towada, Aomori Prefecture, Japan
- Komazawa-daigaku Station, a railway station on the Tokyu Den-en-toshi Line in Setagaya, Tokyo, Japan
- Nagoya Daigaku Station, a railway station in Chikusa-ku, Nagoya, Aichi Prefecture, Japan
- Niigata Daigaku-mae Eki, the Japanese name for Niigata University Station, a railway station in Nishi-ku, Niigata, Niigata Prefecture, Japan
- Ōita-Daigaku-mae Station, a railway station in Ōita City, Ōita Prefecture, Japan
- Ōtsuka-Teikyō-Daigaku Station, a railway station on the Tama Toshi Monorail Line in Hachiōji, Tokyo, Japan
- Shinkyū-Daigaku-mae Station, a railway station in Nantan, Kyoto Prefecture, Japan
- Toritsu-daigaku Station, a railway station in Meguro Ward, Tokyo, Japan
