= Daigakumae Station =

Daigakumae Station may refer to several train stations in Japan:

== Current name ==
- Daigakumae Station (Nagano)
- Daigaku-mae Station (Shiga)
- Toyamadaigakumae Station, Toyama
- Kitasato-Daigaku-mae Station, Towada
- Kurume-Daigakumae Station
- Ōita-Daigaku-mae Station
- Shinkyū-Daigaku-mae Station, Nantan
- Niigata University Station (Japanese: Niigata Daigaku-mae-eki)

== Former name ==
- Kandai-mae Station, Osaka
- Nisseki-byoin-mae Station, Hiroshima

== See also ==
- Daigaku Station (disambiguation)
