= Tachikawa, Tokyo =

City in Tokyo Metropolis, Japan

Tachikawa 立川市
- City
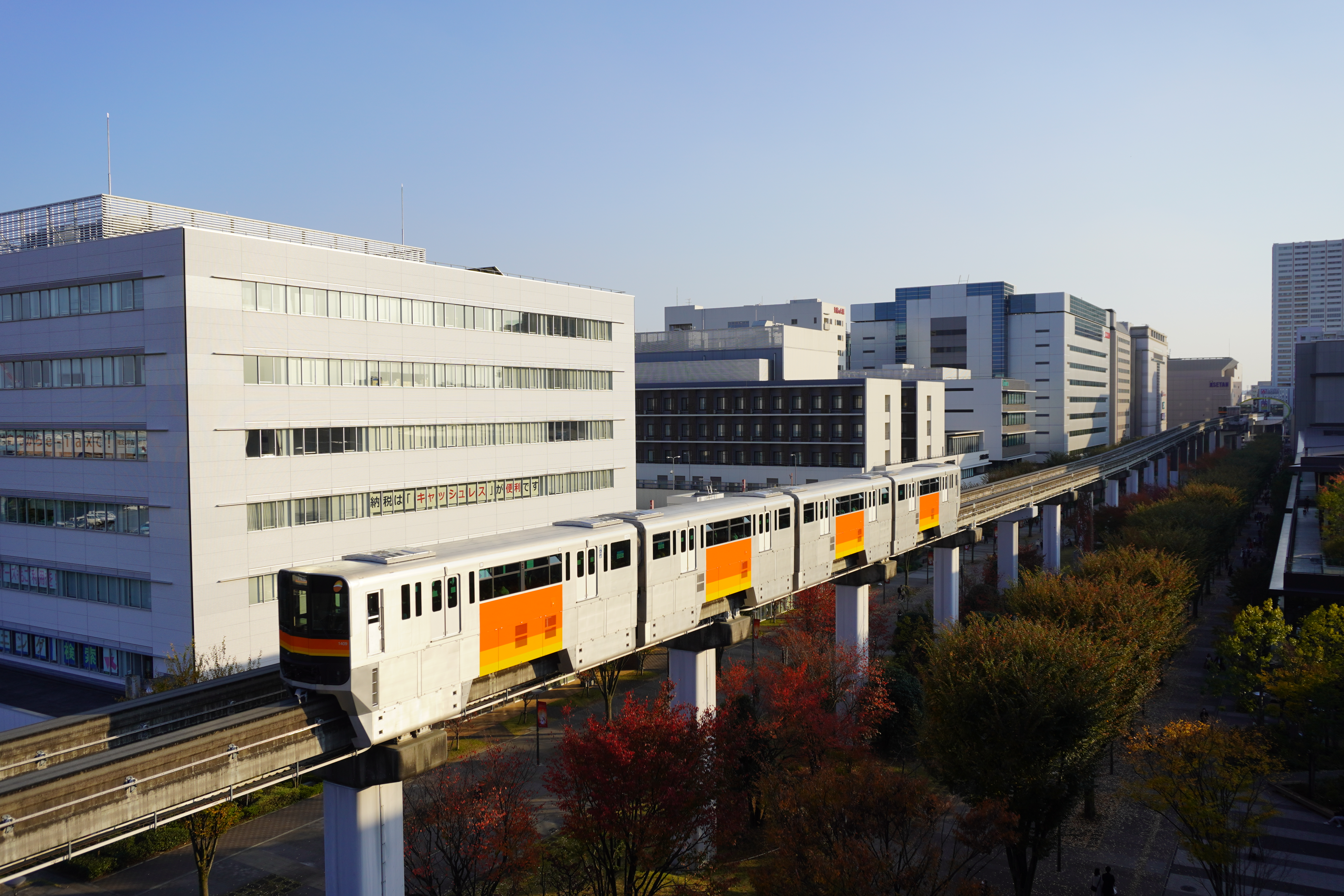
- Tama Intercity Monorail viewed from Green Springs

- Flag Seal

- Location of Tachikawa in Tokyo

- Coordinates: 35°41′39.2″N 139°25′10.8″E
- Country: Japan
- Region: Kantō
- Prefecture: Tokyo
- First official recorded: 8th century (official)
- Town settled: December 1, 1924
- City settled: December 1, 1940

Government
  - Mayor: Daishi Sakai (from September 2023)

Area
  - Total: 24.36 km^{2} (9.41 sq mi)

Population (March 1, 2021)
  - Total: 184,383
  - Density: 7,569/km^{2} (19,600/sq mi)
- Time zone: UTC+9 (Japan Standard Time)
- Symbols
  - Tree: Zelkova serrata
  - Flower: Magnolia kobus
- Phone number: 042-523-2111
- Address: 1156-9 Izumi-cho, Tachikawa-shi, Tokyo 190-8666
- Website: city.tachikawa.lg.jp

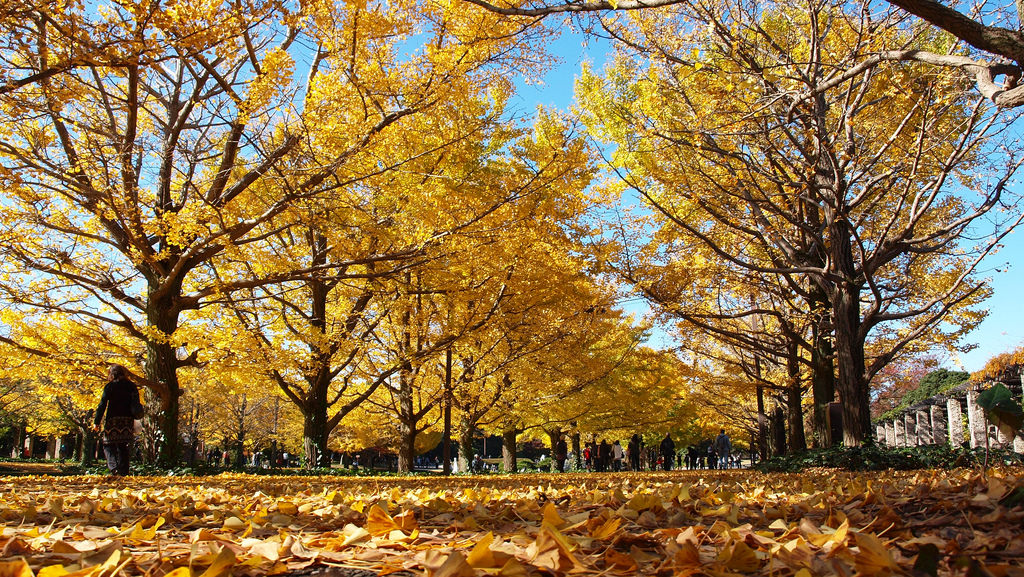
Showa Memorial Park

Tachikawa (立川市, Tachikawa-shi; Japanese pronunciation: [tä̀.c̟͡ɕi̥.kä̀.β̞ä̀, -kä́.β̞ä̀, -kä́.β̞ä́.ɕì]) is a city located in the western portion of the Tokyo Metropolis, Japan. As of 1 March 2021, the city had an estimated population of 184,383 in 93,428 households, and a population density of 7,600 persons per km^{2}. The total area of the city is 24.36 square kilometres (9.41 sq mi).

== Geography ==
Tachikawa is located on the Musashino Terrace of western Tokyo, approximately 40 km west of the center of Tokyo. The Tama River flows between Tachikawa and the neighboring city of Hino. The Tamagawa-jousui (Tamagawa Aqueduct) flows north of the city, with a great promenade on both banks.

=== Surrounding municipalities ===
Tokyo Metropolis

- Akishima
- Fussa
- Higashiyamato
- Hino
- Kodaira
- Kokubunji
- Kunitachi
- Musashimurayama

=== Climate ===
Tachikawa has a humid subtropical climate (Köppen Cfa) characterized by warm summers and cool winters with light to no snowfall. The average annual temperature in Tachikawa is 13.9 °C. The average annual rainfall is 1647 mm with September as the wettest month. The temperatures are highest on average in August, at around 25.4 °C, and lowest in January, at around 2.4 °C.

== Demographics ==
Per Japanese census data, the population of Tachikawa has increased steadily over the past century.

Historical population
| Year | Pop. | ±% |
|---|---|---|
| 1920 | 9,987 | — |
| 1930 | 19,275 | +93.0% |
| 1940 | 41,070 | +113.1% |
| 1950 | 63,218 | +53.9% |
| 1960 | 81,951 | +29.6% |
| 1970 | 117,057 | +42.8% |
| 1980 | 142,675 | +21.9% |
| 1990 | 152,824 | +7.1% |
| 2000 | 164,709 | +7.8% |
| 2010 | 179,668 | +9.1% |
| 2020 | 183,581 | +2.2% |

== History ==
The area of present-day Tachikawa was part of ancient Musashi Province and was controlled from the Heian period through the Sengoku period by the Tachikawa clan. In the Edo period, it was little more than a village along the Koshu Kaido. In the post-Meiji Restoration cadastral reform of July 22, 1878, the area became part of Kitatama District in Kanagawa Prefecture In the Meiji period, the opening of what would later become the Chuo Main Line in 1889 led to a large-scale land development and on April 1, 1889, with the establishment of the modern municipalities law, the village of Tachikawa was created. Kitatama District was transferred to the administrative control of Tokyo Metropolis on April 1, 1893. Tachikawa Airfield was established in 1922 by the Imperial Japanese Army, and Tachikawa was elevated to town status the following year. On December 1, 1940, Tachikawa was elevated to city status. Before the war, Tachikawa was a military town centered on Tachikawa Airfield, and even after the war, it was a major base for the U.S. military until 1977.

=== 2011 robbery ===
On May 12, 2011, the robbery of the largest amount of money in Japanese history took place in the city. At 3 a.m. that day, two men wearing masks broke into the office of a security company, bound the sole security guard, beat him until he revealed the code to the company's vault, and then made off with 70 bags of cash containing ¥604 million. The security guard, 36, was seriously injured. Hideaki Ueki, 31, Yutaka Watanabe, 41, Tsutomu Sakuma, 37, and three others were later arrested and charged with perpetrating the crime. All the men allegedly had ties to the Yakuza.

== Government ==
Tachikawa has a mayor-council form of government with a directly elected mayor and a unicameral city council of 28 members. Tachikawa contributes two members to the Tokyo Metropolitan Assembly. In terms of national politics, the city is part of Tokyo 21st district of the lower house of the Diet of Japan.

== Economy ==
Tachikawa is a regional commercial center, and is also a commuter town for downtown Tokyo. It is the central city of the populous "Tokyo Santama district", and commercial facilities such as department stores and offices are concentrated around Tachikawa Station. Agriculture is now largely vestigial, but Tachikawa was formerly known for its production of udo.

== Education ==
=== Universities and colleges ===
- Kunitachi College of Music
- Tokyo Health Care University - Tachikawa campus

=== Primary and secondary schools ===
The city has two public high schools and one public junior-senior high school operated by the Tokyo Metropolitan Government Board of Education.

- Tachikawa High School
- Sunagawa High School
- Tachikawa Kokusai Secondary Education School - "Kokusai" means international

Tachikawa has 19 public elementary and nine public junior high schools operated by the city government.

Municipal junior high schools:

- Tachikawa No. 1 (立川第一中学校)
- Tachikawa No. 2 (立川第二中学校)
- Tachikawa No. 3 (立川第三中学校)
- Tachikawa No. 4 (立川第四中学校)
- Tachikawa No. 5 (立川第五中学校)
- Tachikawa No. 6 (立川第六中学校)
- Tachikawa No. 7 (立川第七中学校)
- Tachikawa No. 8 (立川第八中学校)
- Tachikawa No. 9 (立川第九中学校)

Municipal elementary schools:

- Tachikawa Daiichi (No. 1) Elementary School (第一小学校)
- No. 2 Elementary School (第二小学校)
- No. 3 Elementary School (第三小学校)
- No. 4 Elementary School (第四小学校)
- No. 5 Elementary School (第五小学校)
- No. 6 Elementary School (第六小学校)
- No. 7 Elementary School (第七小学校)
- No. 8 Elementary School (第八小学校)
- No. 9 Elementary School (第九小学校)
- No. 10 Elementary School (第十小学校)
- Kamisunagawa Elementary School (上砂川小学校)
- Kashiwa Elementary School (柏小学校)
- Matsunaka Elementary School (松中小学校)
- Minamisuna Elementary School (南砂小学校)
- Nishisuna Elementary School (西砂小学校)
- Oyama Elementary School (大山小学校)
- Saiwai Elementary School (幸小学校)
- Shinsei Elementary School (新生小学校)
- Wakabadai Elementary School (若葉台小学校)

There are also three private high schools.

- Seisa Kokusai High School
- Showa Daiichi Gakuen High School
- Tachikawa Girls' High School

=== International schools ===
- Tachikawa International Secondary Education School.
- West Tokyo Korean 1st Elementary and Junior High School (西東京朝鮮第一初中級学校) - North Korean school

=== Public libraries ===
The Tokyo Metropolitan Library Tama Library opened in Tachikawa in 1987 to relieve municipal libraries.

== Transportation ==
=== Railway ===
JR East – Chūō Main Line

- Tachikawa

JR East – Ōme Line

- Tachikawa - Nishi-Tachikawa

JR East – Nanbu Line

- Tachikawa - Nishi-Kunitachi

- Seibu Railway - Seibu Haijima Line

- Tamagawa-Jōsui - Musashi-Sunagawa - Seibu-Tachikawa

Tama Monorail

- Sunagawa-Nanaban - Izumi-Taiikukan - Tachihi - Takamatsu - Tachikawa-Kita - Tachikawa-Minami - Shibasaki-Taiikukan

=== Highway ===
Tachikawa is not served by any national expressways or national highways.

== Local attractions ==
- Showa Memorial Park, an expansive leisure and recreational facility operated by the national government, occupies 1.49 square kilometres of land that was formerly part of Tachikawa Air Base in Tachikawa and neighboring Akishima.
- Tachikawa Velodrome

== Notable people ==
- Diana DeGette (born 1957), U.S. representative for Colorado
- Alan Hale (born 1958), astronomer who co-discovered Comet Hale–Bopp

== Sister cities ==
- San Bernardino, California, United States, since December 23, 1959
