= Tama Toshi Monorail Line =

Monorail line in Tokyo, Japan

Tama Toshi Monorail Line

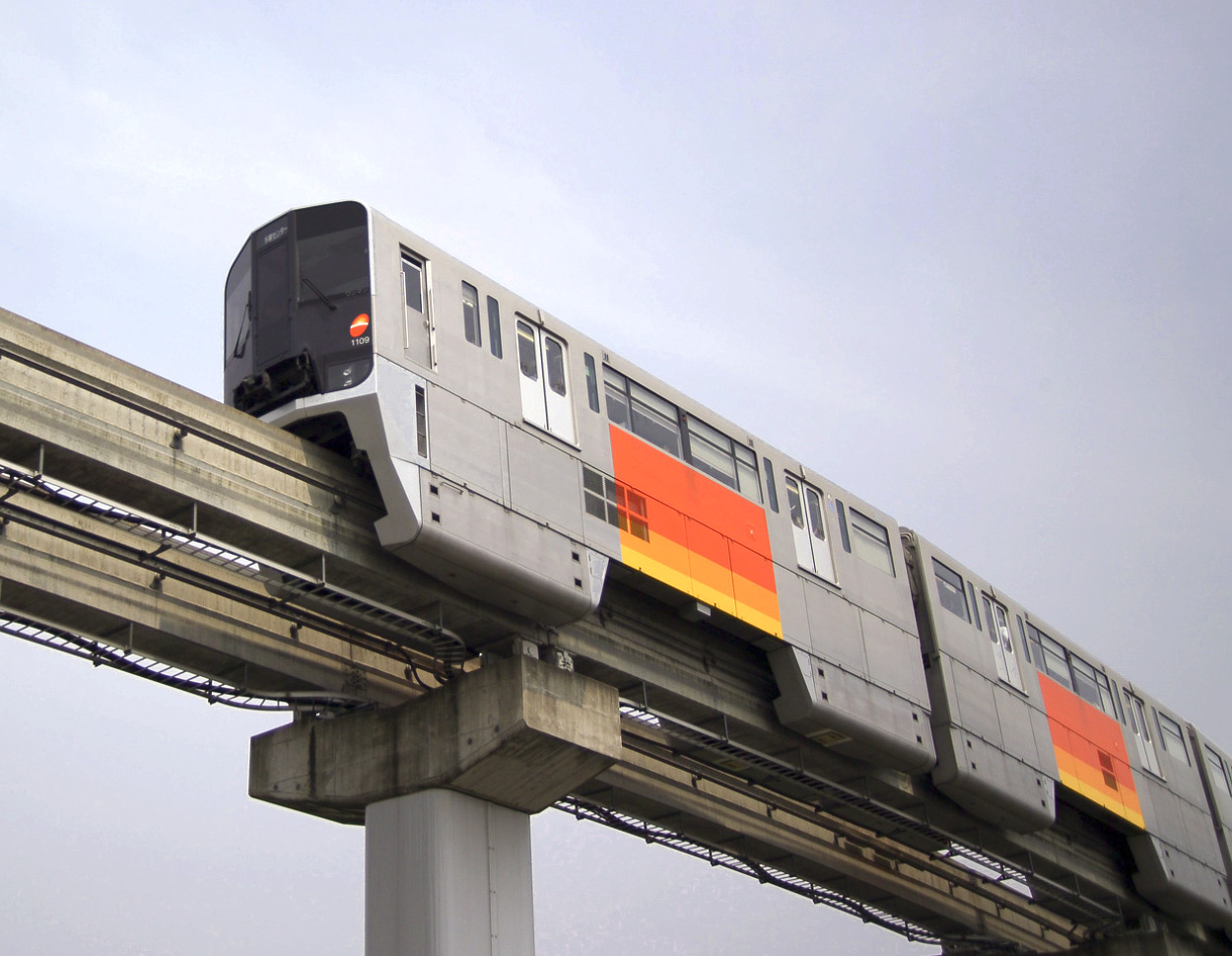

Overview
- Owner: Tokyo Tama Intercity Monorail Co., Ltd, owned mostly by the Tokyo Metropolitan Government (79.9%)
- Locale: Western Tokyo, Japan
- Termini: Kamikitadai; Tama-Center
- Stations: 19
- Website: www.tama-monorail.co.jp

Service
- Type: Straddle-beam monorail (Alweg‑type)
- Rolling stock: 1000 series
- Daily ridership: 131,782 (JFY23)

History
- Opened: 27 November 1998

Technical
- Line length: 16.0 km (9.94 mi)
- Electrification: Contact rails, 1,500 V DC
- Operating speed: 65 km/h (40 mph)

The Tama Toshi Monorail Line (Japanese: 多摩都市モノレール線, Hepburn: Tamatoshi Monorēru-sen), often referred to as simply the Tama Monorail, is a straddle-beam, Alweg-type monorail line in Western Tokyo. Operated by the Tokyo Tama Intercity Monorail Co., Ltd., the double tracked, 16.0 km (9.9 mi) monorail line carries passengers between the suburban cities of Higashiyamato and Tama via Tachikawa, Hino, and Hachiōji in 36 minutes.

Tachikawa-Kita, Tachikawa-Minami, and Tama-Center stations are the most important stations, enabling transfer at Tachikawa to JR East's Chūō Main Line and at Tama-Center to the Odakyu Tama Line and Keio Sagamihara Line.

Tourist venues along the line include Tama Zoo and Keio Rail-Land (a railway museum), both adjacent to Tama-Dōbutsukōen Station.

== Stations ==
All stations are located in Tokyo. Most stations have an associated shape/image (as seen in the left-most column of the table below).

Station		Distance		Transfers	Location
Station		Total	Minutes	Transfers	Location
TT-19	Kamikitadai 上北台	0.0 km (0 mi)	0		Higashiyamato
TT-18	Sakura-Kaidō 桜街道	0.7 km (0.43 mi)	2		Higashiyamato
TT-17	Tamagawa-Jōsui 玉川上水	1.5 km (0.93 mi)	4	Haijima Line (SS33)	Higashiyamato
TT-16	Sunagawa-Nanaban 砂川七番	2.5 km (1.6 mi)	6		Tachikawa
TT-15	Izumi-Taiikukan 泉体育館	3.0 km (1.9 mi)	7		Tachikawa
TT-14	Tachihi 立飛	3.6 km (2.2 mi)	9		Tachikawa
TT-13	Takamatsu 高松	4.2 km (2.6 mi)	10		Tachikawa
TT-12	Tachikawa-Kita 立川北	5.4 km (3.4 mi)	13	Tachikawa: Chūō Line (JC19) Ōme Line (JC19) Nambu Line (JN26)	Tachikawa
TT-11	Tachikawa-Minami 立川南	5.8 km (3.6 mi)	14	Tachikawa: Chūō Line (JC19) Ōme Line (JC19) Nambu Line (JN26)	Tachikawa
TT-10	Shibasaki-Taiikukan 柴崎体育館	6.5 km (4.0 mi)	16		Tachikawa
TT-09	Kōshū-Kaidō 甲州街道	8.0 km (5.0 mi)	19		Hino
TT-08	Manganji 万願寺	9.3 km (5.8 mi)	21		Hino
TT-07	Takahatafudō 高幡不動	10.5 km (6.5 mi)	24	Keiō Line (KO29); Dōbutsuen Line (KO29)	Hino
TT-06	Hodokubo 程久保	11.3 km (7.0 mi)	26		Hino
TT-05	Tama-dōbutsukōen 多摩動物公園	12.3 km (7.6 mi)	28	Dōbutsuen Line (KO47)	Hino
TT-04	Chūō-Daigaku-Meisei-Daigaku 中央大学・明星大学	13.4 km (8.3 mi)	30		Hachiōji
TT-03	Ōtsuka Teikyo-Daigaku 大塚・帝京大学	14.3 km (8.9 mi)	32		Hachiōji
TT-02	Matsugaya 松が谷	15.1 km (9.4 mi)	34		Hachiōji
TT-01	Tama-Center 多摩センター	16.0 km (9.9 mi)	36	Sagamihara Line (Keio-tama-center: KO41); Tama Line (Odakyū Tama-Center: OT06)	Tama

== History ==
The line opened in two phases. The section from Kamikitadai to Tachikawa-Kita opened in November 1998 while the section south to Tama-Center opened in January 2000.

Station numbering was introduced to all stations in February 2018.

=== Future plans ===
As of October 2022, there are plans to extend the route. One route is an extension north from the current terminus at Kamikitadai to Hakonegasaki Station on the Hachiko Line. The other two are southbound extensions from Tama-Center to Hachioji and Machida respectively.

==== Kamikitadai to Hakonegasaki ====
In 2016, a proposal was made to extend the line from the current northern terminus at Kamikitadai Station to Hakonegasaki Station on the Hachikō Line. The planned extension to Hakonegasaki had been considered since planning for the entire route began in 1981. The seven-station extension will be 7 km (4.3 mi) long and is projected to cost ¥80 billion (2021) (equivalent to ¥87 billion or US$574.74 million in 2024). In May 2025, Tama Toshi Monorail received a patent for extension work from the Minister of Land, Infrastructure, Transport and Tourism and the extension was projected to cost ¥129 billion (2024) (US$852.24 million). As of May 2025, it is scheduled to open in the mid-2030s.

Construction of the extension to Hakonegasaki was approved on 27 November 2025. The cost has since risen to ¥90 billion (2024) (US$594.58 million) and will include seven new stations. The extension is still projected to open in the mid-2030s.

==== Tama-Center to Hachioji ====
A southward expansion of the monorail line to Hachiōji Station was also considered since the planning phase of the line in the 1980s. The expansion had also been considered to be run as a separate light rail transit line, but was ultimately abandoned in December 2016 citing topographical and technological constraints. As of 2016 the projected cost is ¥190 billion (2016) (equivalent to ¥211.03 billion or US$1.39 billion in 2024).

==== Tama-Center to Machida ====
An extension from Tama-Center to Machida Station has also been considered since the planning phase of the line in the 1980s. As of January 2022, the exact route remains undecided. The most recent estimate determined that the construction would cost ¥170 billion (2016) (equivalent to ¥188.82 billion or US$1.25 billion in 2024).

(video) A monorail train slides along the track, 2016

== See also ==
- Monorails in Japan
- List of rapid transit systems
