= Tachikawa-Kita Station =

Monorail station in Tachikawa, Tokyo, Japan

Coordinates: 35°41′58″N 139°24′45″E

Tachikawa-Kita Station 立川北駅
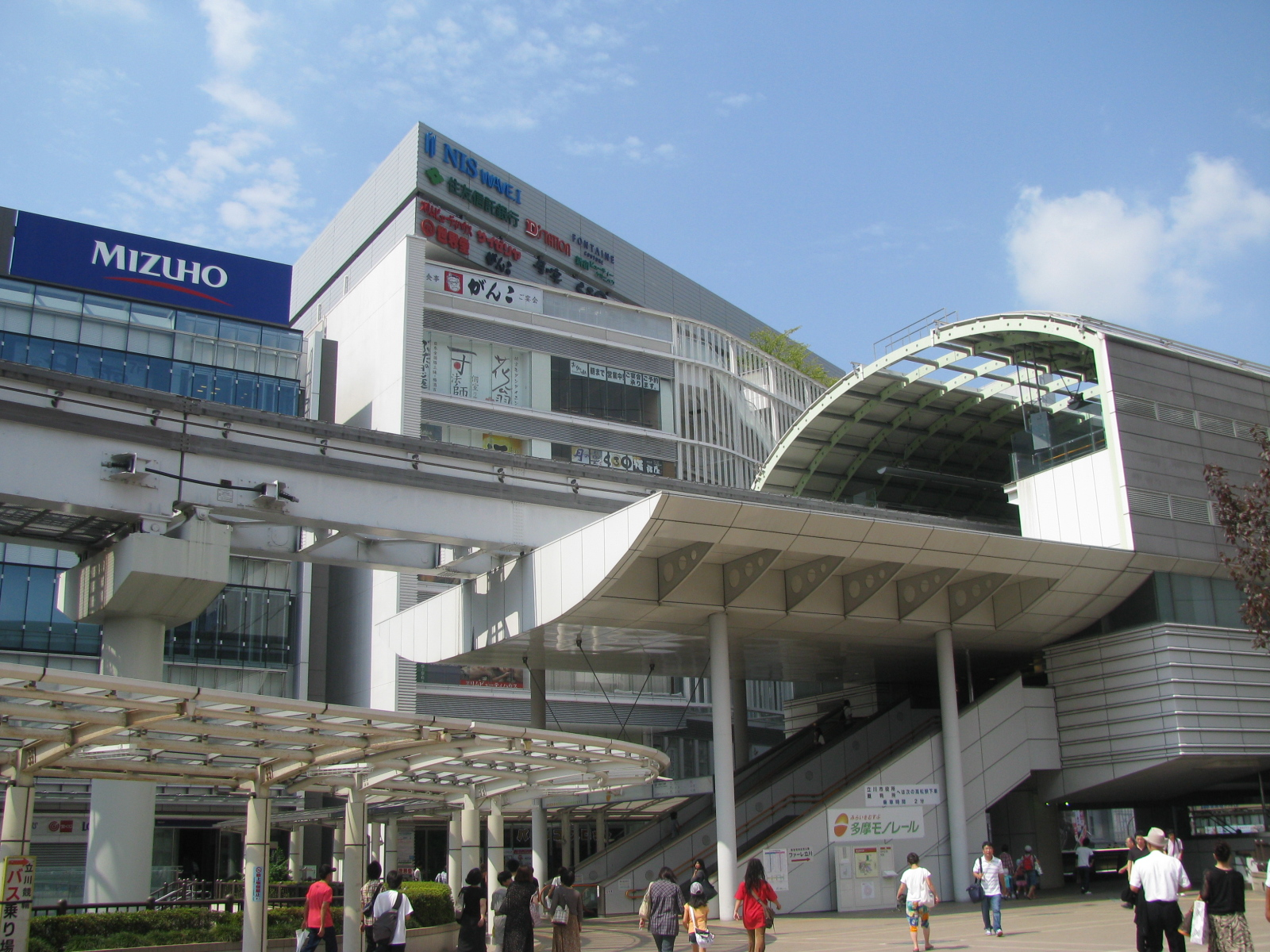
- Tachikawa-Kita Station in September 2010

General information
- Location: 2-4 Akebono-chō, Tachikawa-shi, Tokyo 190-0012; Japan
- Operator: Tokyo Tama Intercity Monorail
- Line: ■ Tama Toshi Monorail Line
- Distance: 5.4 km from Kamikitadai
- Platforms: 2 side platforms
- Tracks: 2
- Connections: Tachikawa Station; Bus terminal

Construction
- Structure type: Elevated

Other information
- Station code: TT12
- Website: www.tama-monorail.co.jp/monorail/station/tachikawa-kita/index.html

History
- Opened: 27 November 1998

Passengers
- FY2013: 19,006 daily

Services
Preceding station	Tokyo Tama Intercity Monorail	Following station
Tachikawa-Minami (TT-11) towards Tama-Center	Tama Toshi Monorail Line	Takamatsu (TT-13) towards Kamikitadai
Location
- Location within Japan

Tachikawa-Kita Station (立川北駅, Tachikawa-Kita-eki) is a station on the Tama Toshi Monorail Line in Tachikawa, Tokyo, Japan.

== Lines ==
Tachikawa-Kita Station is served by the Tama Toshi Monorail Line and is located 5.4 km (3.4 mi) from the northern terminus of the line at Kamikitadai Station.

== Station layout ==
Tachikawa-Kita Station is a raised station with two tracks and two opposed side platforms, with the station building located underneath.

=== Platforms ===
1	■ Tama Toshi Monorail Line	for Tamagawa-Jōsui and Kamikitadai
2	■ Tama Toshi Monorail Line	for Takahatafudō and Tama-Center

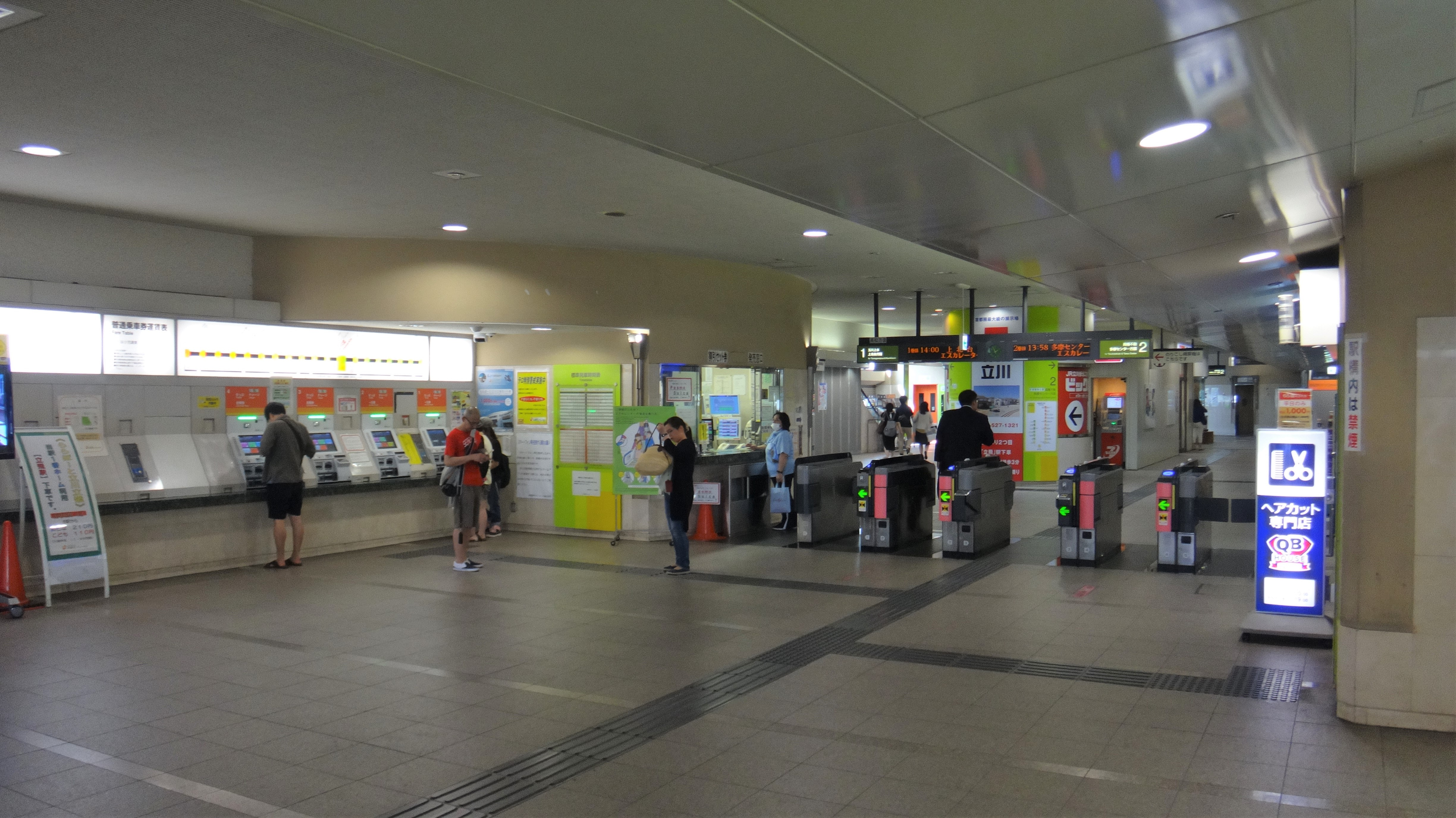
The ticket barriers in August 2016

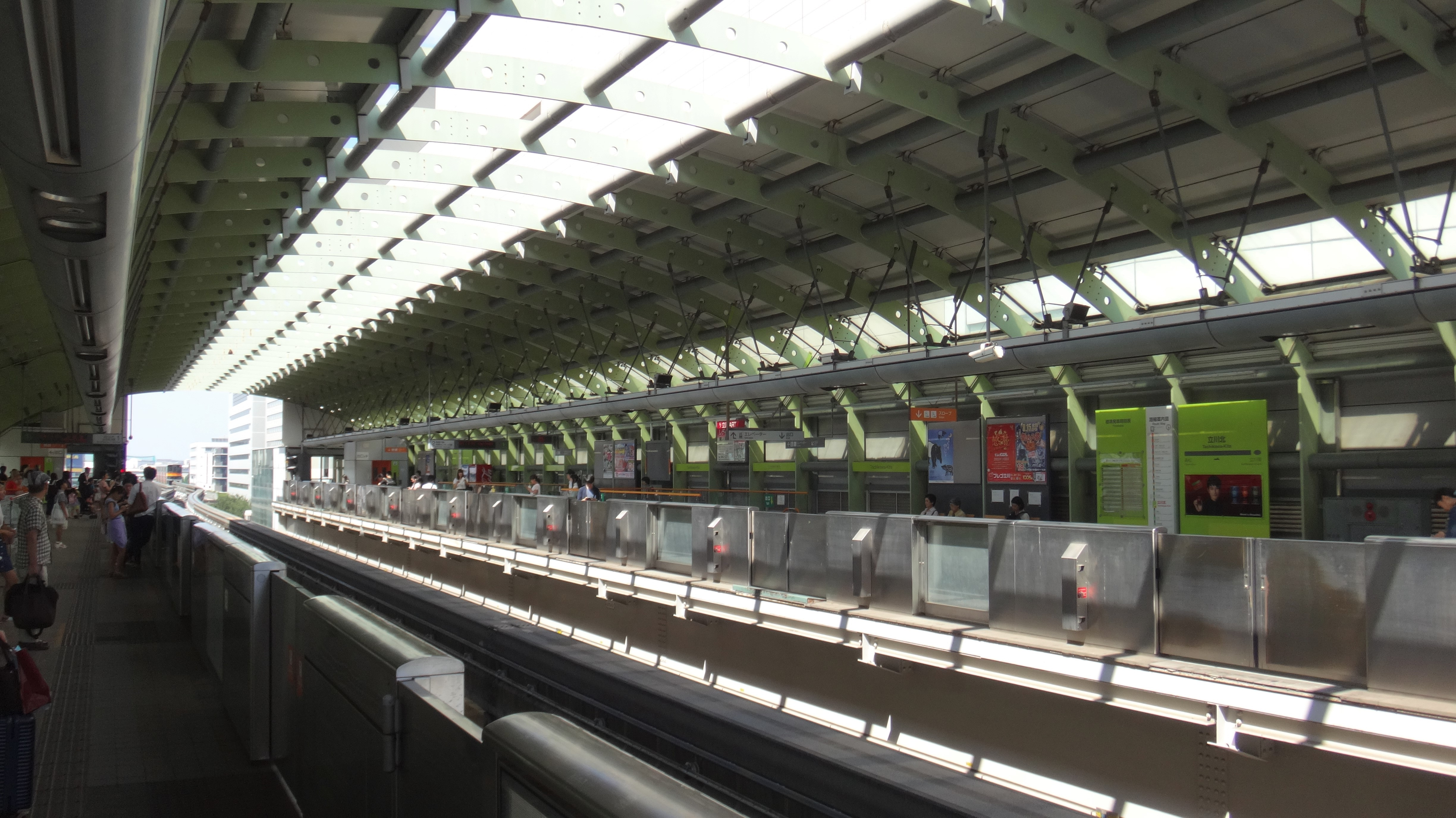
The station platforms in August 2016

== History ==
Tachikawa-Kita station opened on 27 November 1998. It was the southern terminus until the extension south to Tama-Center was opened in January 2000.

Station numbering was introduced in February 2018 with Tachikawa-Kita being assigned TT12.

== Surrounding area ==
The station is just north of JR Tachikawa Station. Both stations (and Tachikawa-Minami Station) are connected via a pedestrian walkway. Other points of interest include:

- Showa Memorial Park

== See also ==
- List of railway stations in Japan
