= Tamagawa-Jōsui Station =

Railway and monorail station in Tachikawa, Tokyo, Japan

Tamagawa-Jōsui Station 玉川上水駅
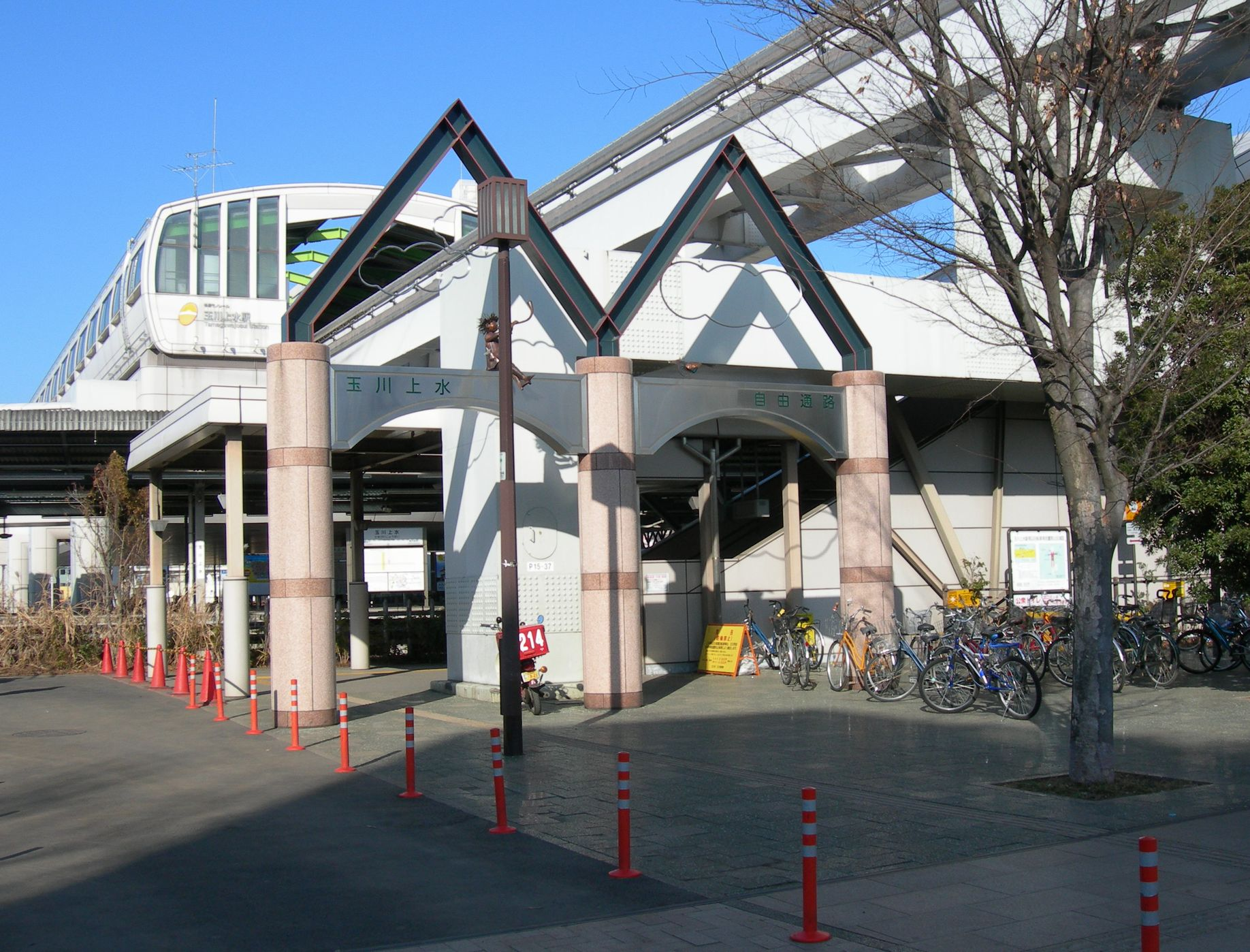
- Tamagawa-Jōsui Station

General information
- Location: Tachikawa, Tokyo and Higashiyamato, Tokyo; Japan
- Coordinates: 35°43′55″N 139°25′06″E
- Operator: Seibu Railway; Tokyo Tama Intercity Monorail
- Lines: Seibu Haijima Line; ■ Tama Toshi Monorail Line
- Connections: Bus terminal
Location
- Location within Tokyo Location within Japan

Tamagawa-Jōsui Station (玉川上水駅, Tamagawa Jōsui-eki) is a passenger railway station located in the city of Tachikawa, Tokyo, Japan, operated by the private railway operator Seibu Railway, and a monorail station operated by the Tokyo Tama Intercity Monorail in Higashiyamato, Tokyo, Japan. The two stations are adjacent to, and at right angles to one another, with the border between the two cities passing in between the stations. The names of the stations are identical in Japanese, but are transliterated slightly different in romaji such that the Seibu Station is Tamagawa-Jōsui Station, whereas the Tokyo Tama Intercity Monorail is Tamagawajosui Station (i.e. without the hypen or diacritic mark).

== Lines ==
Tamagawa-Jōsui Station is served by the Seibu Haijima Line, and is 7.2 kilometers from the terminus of that line at Kodaira Station. The monorail station is served by the Tama Toshi Monorail Line and is 1.5 kilometers from the terminus of the line at Kamikitadai Station.

== Station layout ==
SS33 Tamagawa-Jōsui Station 玉川上水駅
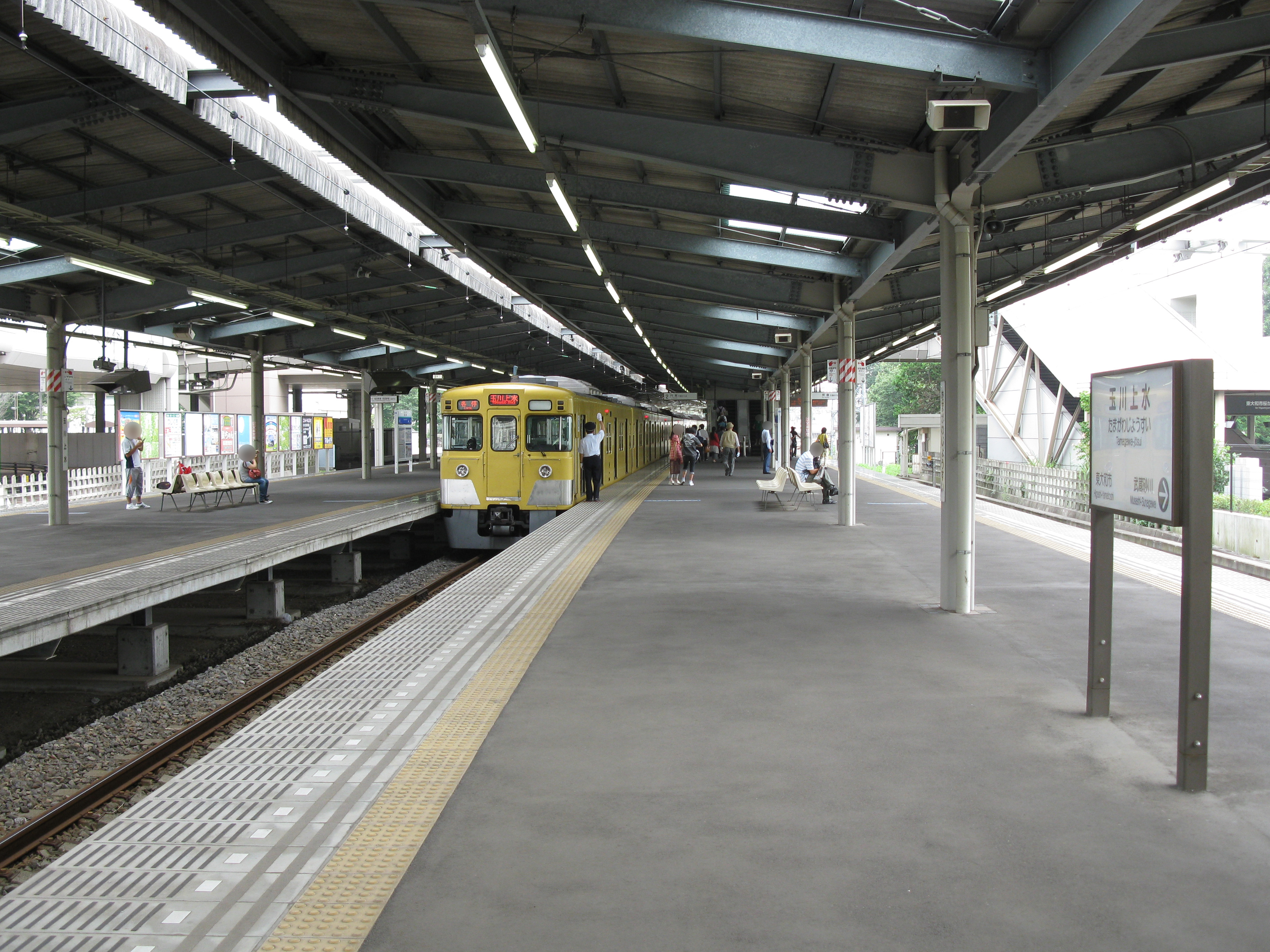
- Tamagawa-Jōsui Station platforms

General information
- Location: 6-36-1 Saiwai-chō, Tachikawa-shi, Tokyo-to 190-0002; Japan
- System: Seibu Railway
- Operator: Seibu Railway
- Line: Seibu Haijima Line
- Platforms: 2 island platforms

Other information
- Station code: SS33
- Website: Official website

History
- Opened: May 15, 1950

Passengers
- FY2019: 42,416

Services
Preceding station	Seibu Railway	Following station
Musashi-Sunagawa SS34 towards Haijima	Haijima Liner	Higashi-Yamatoshi SS32 towards Seibu-Shinjuku
Musashi-Sunagawa SS34 towards Haijima	Haijima Line Express Semi Express Local	Higashi-Yamatoshi SS32 towards Kodaira
Location

=== Seibu Railway ===
The Seibu station consists of two island platforms served by three tracks.

1	Seibu Haijima Line	for Musashi-Sunagawa, Seibu-Tachikawa, and Haijima
2	Seibu Haijima Line	Disembarking only
3/4	Seibu Haijima Line	for Kodaira, Kami-Shakujii, and Seibu-Shinjuku

Platforms 2 and 3 share the same track. Trains that enter service at this station usually stop at Platform 3.

=== Tama Toshi Monorail ===
Tamagawajosui Station 玉川上水駅
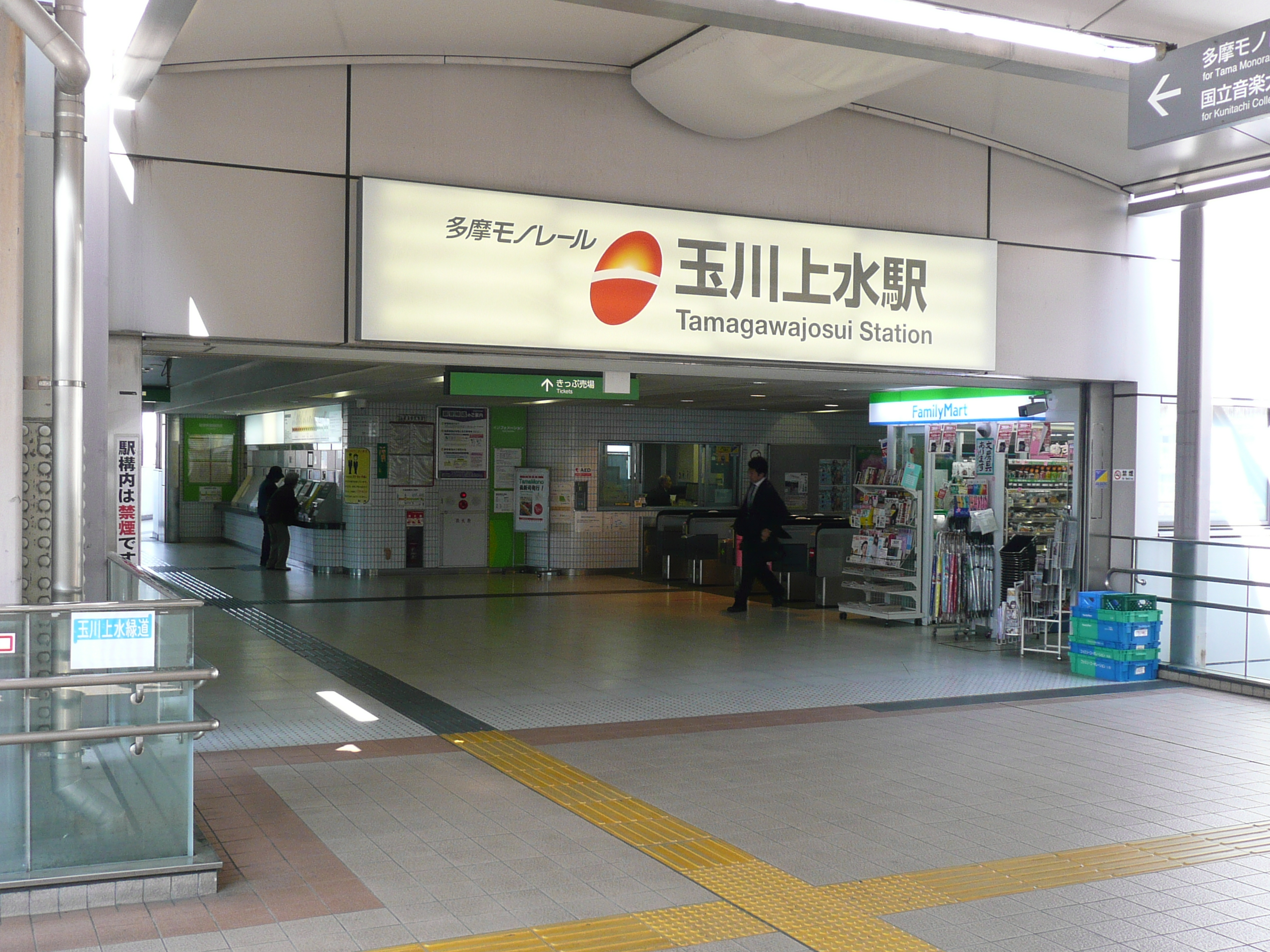
- Tamagawajosui Exit

General information
- Location: 4-19 Sakuragaoka, Higashiyamato-shi, Tokyo; Japan
- System: Monorail
- Operator: Tokyo Tama Intercity Monorail
- Line: ■ Tama Toshi Monorail Line
- Platforms: 2 side platforms

Other information
- Station code: TT17
- Website: Official website

History
- Opened: 27 November 1998

Passengers
- FY2019: 24,696

Services
Preceding station	Tokyo Tama Intercity Monorail	Following station
Sunagawa-Nanaban (TT-16) towards Tama-Center	Tama Toshi Monorail Line	Sakurakaidō (TT-18) towards Kamikitadai
Location

The elevated station consists of two side platforms served by two tracks.

1	■ Tama Toshi Monorail Line	for Sakura-Kaidō and Kamikitadai
2	■ Tama Toshi Monorail Line	for Tachikawa-Kita, Takahatafudō, and Tama-Center

== History ==
The Seibu station opened on May 15, 1950. The Tama Toshi Monorail station opened on 27 November 1998.

An enclosed waiting room was built on the Haijima Line platform in November 2007.

Station numbering was introduced on the Tama Toshi Monorail Line in February 2018 with its station being assigned TT17.

In celebration of the 10th service anniversary of the Seibu 30000 series "Smile Train" as well as Gudetama's 5th birthday (both in April 2018), one of its 30000 series trains, the station's signboards and waiting areas will adopt the "Gudetama" theme beginning March 2018.

== Passenger statistics ==
In fiscal 2019, the station was the 22nd busiest on the Seibu network with an average of 42,416 passengers daily. During the same year, the Tama Monorail reported an average of 24,696 passengers daily.

The passenger figures for previous years are as shown below.

Fiscal year	Seibu	Tama Monorail
2005	17,934	8,652
2010	19,649	10,205
2015	21,024	11,288

== Surrounding area ==
The station area is a mix of residential apartment blocks and commercial buildings. Tamagawa-Jōsui, the source waterway of the Tama River, flows to the south of the station. The Risshō Kōsei Kai Kōsei cemetery is a short walk northwest.

The former Yamato Air Station (大和基地), used by the U.S forces after the end of the second world war, was on the land adjacent (northeast) of the station. A commemorative monument for the base is located a short distance from the (monorail) station's east exits.

== See also ==
- Tamagawa Aqueduct
- List of railway stations in Japan
