= Tama-Center Station =

Railway and monorail station in Tama, Tokyo, Japan

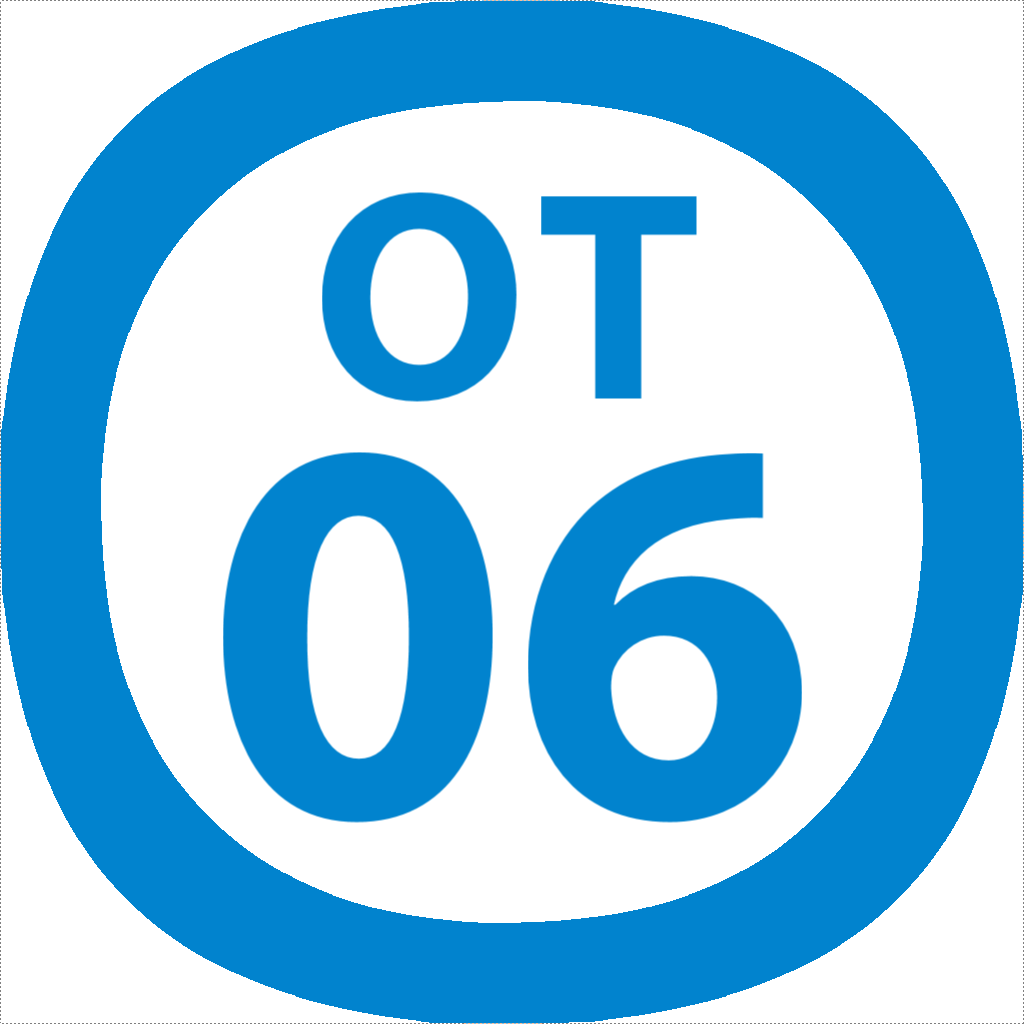
Tama-Center Station 多摩センター駅

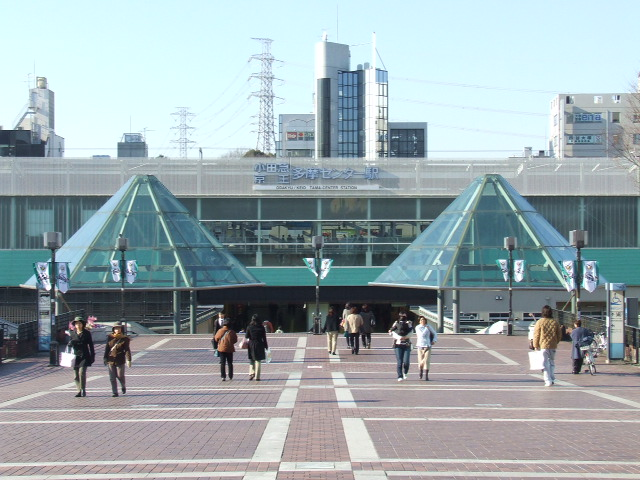
- Tama-Center Station (south entrance)

General information
- Location: Ochiai 1-chome Tama, Tokyo; Japan
- Coordinates: 35°37′30″N 139°25′27″E
- Operator: Keiō Corporation; Odakyū Electric Railway; Tokyo Tama Intercity Monorail
- Platforms: 2 island platforms; 2 side platforms
- Tracks: 8
- Connections: Bus terminal

Other information
- Station code: KO41 (Keio); OT06 (Odakyu); TT01 (Tama Toshi Monorail)

History
- Opened: 18 October 1974; 51 years ago

Passengers
- Keiō: 90,353; Odakyū: 51,315; Tama Toshi Monorail: 37,449

Services
Preceding station	Keio Corporation	Following station
Minami-ōsawa towards Hashimoto	Keiō Liner	Keiō-nagayama towards Shinjuku
Minami-ōsawa towards Hashimoto	Sagamihara Line Special Express Express	Keiō-nagayama towards Chōfu
Keiō-horinouchi towards Hashimoto	Sagamihara Line Semi Express Rapid Local	Keiō-nagayama towards Chōfu
Preceding station	Odakyu	Following station
Karakida Terminus	Tama Line Rapid Express	Odakyu Nagayama towards Shin-Yurigaoka
Karakida One-way operation	Tama Line Commuter Express	Odakyu Nagayama towards Shin-Yurigaoka
Karakida Terminus	Tama Line Express Local	Odakyu Nagayama towards Shin-Yurigaoka
Preceding station	Tokyo Tama Intercity Monorail	Following station
Terminus	Tama Toshi Monorail Line	Matsugaya (TT02) towards Kamikitadai
Location
- Location within Tokyo Location within Japan

Tama-Center Station (多摩センター駅, Tama-sentaa-eki) is an interchange passenger railway station located in the city of Tama, Tokyo, Japan operated jointly by the private railway companies Keio Corporation and Odakyū Electric Railway and the Tokyo Tama Intercity Monorail Company. The stations are formally known as Keiō Tama-Center (Keiō), Odakyū Tama-Center (Odakyū), and Tama-Center (Tama Monorail).

== Stations ==
=== Keiō Corporation (Keiō Tama-Center Station) ===
The station opened on 18 October 1974. Four elevated tracks serve two island platforms. All trains stop at this station.

1, 2	Keiō Sagamihara Line	for Hashimoto
3, 4	Keiō Sagamihara Line	for Chōfu, Meidaimae, Sasazuka, and Shinjuku; Toei Shinjuku Line for Motoyawata

=== Odakyū Electric Railway (Odakyū Tama-Center Station) ===
The station opened on 23 April 1975. Two elevated tracks serve two side platforms. The station is designed to be able to easily be expanded to four tracks and two island platforms (like the Keiō station). All trains stop at this station.

1	Odakyū Tama Line	for Karakida
2	Odakyū Tama Line	for Shin-Yurigaoka, Yoyogi-Uehara, and Shinjuku; Tokyo Metro Chiyoda Line for Ayase; Joban Line for Abiko and Toride

=== Tama Toshi Monorail (Tama-Center Station) ===
The station opened on 10 January 2000. This is an elevated station with two tracks and two side platforms, with the station building located underneath. It is a standardized station building for this monorail line.

1, 2	Tama Toshi Monorail Line	for Takahatafudō, Tachikawa-Kita, Tamagawa-Jōsui, Kamikitadai

== Surrounding area ==
The station sits at the heart of the planned Tama New Town suburb, and as such is home to most of the area's main commercial and municipal buildings. There are numerous shopping centers centered on a pedestrian mall on the station's south side. Sanrio Puroland is located about 200 meters (660 ft) south-east of the station.

== History ==
- 18 October 1974: Keiō Tama-Center Station opens as a local, rapid, and commuter rapid stop with the extension of the Keiō Sagamihara Line.
- 23 April 1975: Odakyū Tama-Center Station opens as a local stop with the extension of the Odakyū Tama Line.
- 28 May 1992: Special express trains begin service on the Sagamihara Line, stopping at Tama-Center.
- 10 January 2000: Tama Toshi Monorail Tama-Center Station opens.
- 2 December 2000: Special express Homeway and express trains begin service on the Tama Line, stopping at Tama-Center.
- 25 March 2001: On the Sagamihara Line, express trains begin service, stopping at Tama-Center; special express trains are abolished.
- 23 March 2002: Tama Express trains begin service on the Tama Line, stopping at Tama-Center.
- 11 December 2004: Section semi-express trains begin service on the Tama Line, stopping at Tama-Center.
- May 2005 – March 2006: Odakyū Tama-Center Station undergoes renovation.
- 15 March 2008: Special express Metro Homeway trains begin service on the Tama Line, stopping at Tama-Center.
- February 2018: The Tama Toshi Monorail was assigned station number TT01

== Passenger statistics ==
In fiscal 2019, the Keio station was used by an average of 90,353 passengers daily. During the same period, the Odakyu station was used by an average of 51,315 passengers daily. The Tama Monorail station was used by 37,449 passengers daily.

== See also ==
- List of railway stations in Japan
