= Kamikitadai Station =

Monorail station in Higashiyamato, Tokyo, Japan

Coordinates: 35°44′45″N 139°24′57″E

Kamikitadai Station 上北台駅
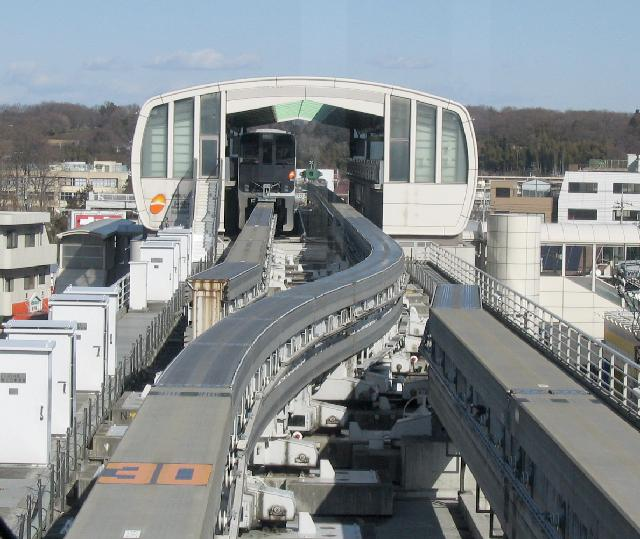
- Kamikitadai Station

General information
- Location: 1-5-1 Kamikitadai, Higashiyamato-shi, Tokyo （東京都東大和市上北台１丁目5-1） Japan
- Operator: Tokyo Tama Intercity Monorail
- Line: ■ Tama Toshi Monorail Line
- Connections: Bus terminal

Other information
- Station code: TT19

History
- Opened: 27 November 1998

Passengers
- FY 2013: 6,138 daily

Services
Preceding station	Tokyo Tama Intercity Monorail	Following station
Sakura-Kaidō (TT-18) towards Tama-Center	Tama Toshi Monorail Line	Terminus
Location

Kamikitadai Station (上北台駅, Kamikitadai-eki) is a monorail station operated by the Tokyo Tama Intercity Monorail Company in Higashiyamato, Tokyo, Japan.

== Lines ==
Kamikitadai Station is a terminus of the 16.0 kilometer Tama Toshi Monorail Line.

== Station layout ==
Kamikitadai Station is a raised station with two tracks and two side platforms. It has a standardized station building of the monorail line.

=== Platforms ===
1	■ Tama Toshi Monorail Line	Tamagawa-Jōsui, Tachikawa-Kita, Takahatafudo, Tama-Center
2	■ Tama Toshi Monorail Line	Tamagawa-Jōsui, Tachikawa-Kita, Takahatafudo, Tama-Center

== Surrounding area ==
The station is above Tokyo Metropolitan Route 43 (Imokubo-Kaidō). Other points of interest include:

- Kita-Tama-Seibu Fire Station
- Higashiyamato Kamikitadai Post Office
- Higashiyamato City Fourth Junior High School
- Higashiyamato City Fifth Junior High School
- Tokyo Metropolitan Route 5 (Shin-Ōme-Kaidō)

== History ==
The station opened on 27 November 1998 with the opening of the line.

Station numbering was introduced in February 2018 with Kamikitadai being assigned TT19.

=== Future plans ===
Plans to extend the line towards Hakonegasaki Station remain unfulfilled.
