= Haruhino Station =

Railway station in Kawasaki, Kanagawa Prefecture, Japan

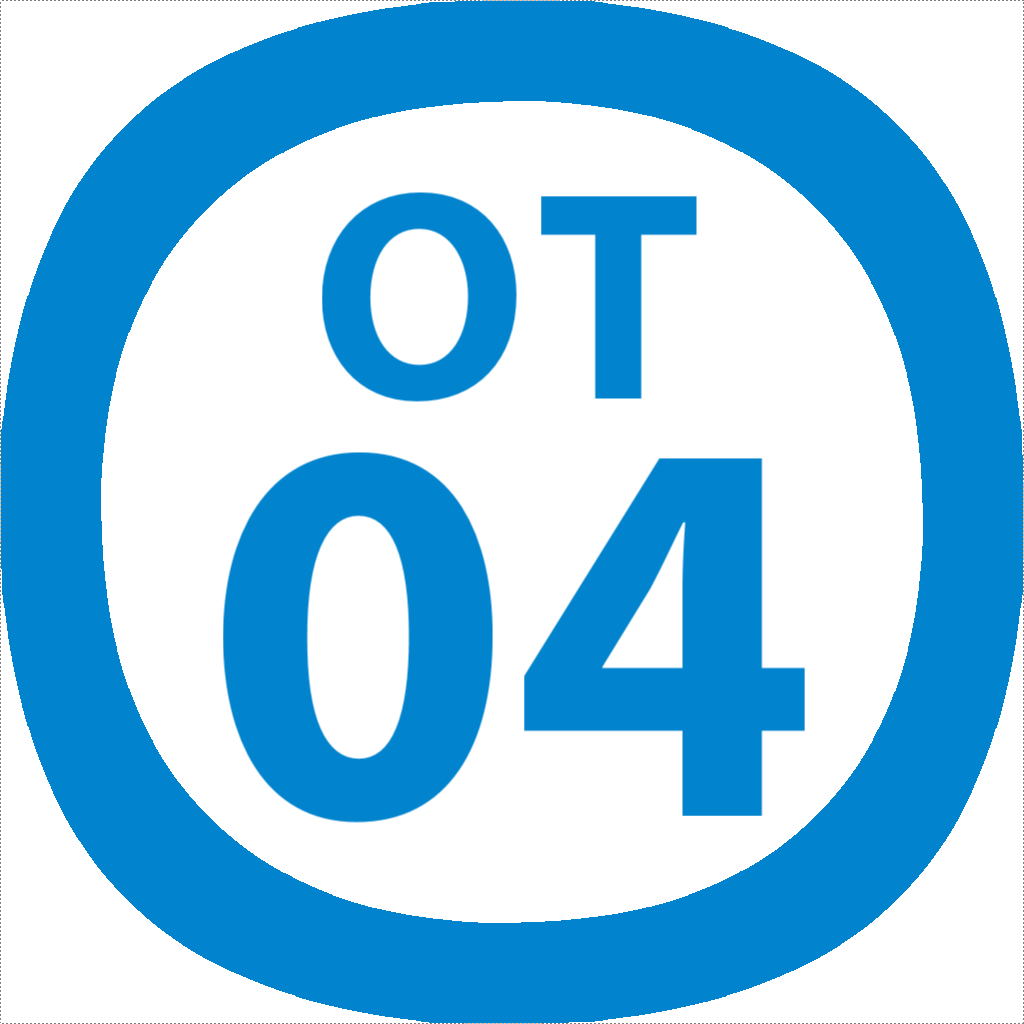
Haruhino Station はるひ野駅

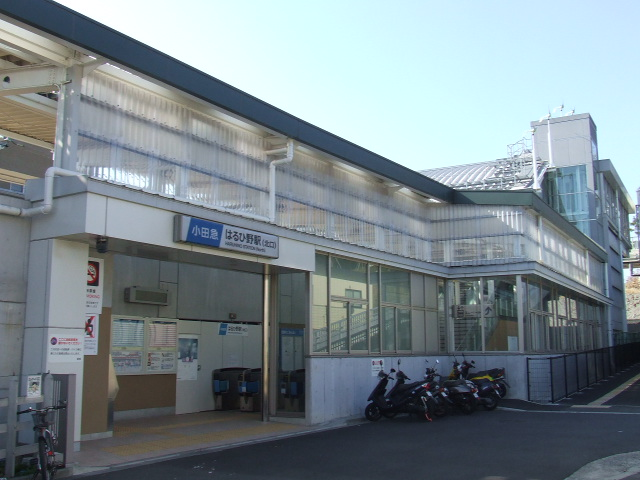
- North Exit of Haruhino Station

General information
- Location: 5-8-1 Haruhino, Asao-ku, Kawasaki-shi, Kanagawa-ken 215-0036; Japan
- Coordinates: 35.6189°N 139.4646°E
- Operator: Odakyu Electric Railway
- Line: Odakyu Odawara Line
- Distance: 4.8 km from Shin-Yurigaoka
- Platforms: 2 side platforms
- Connections: Bus stop

Other information
- Station code: OT04
- Website: Official website

History
- Opened: December 11, 2004; 21 years ago

Passengers
- FY2019: 10,048

Services
Preceding station	Odakyu	Following station
Odakyū-Nagayama towards Karakida	Tama Line Express Local	Kurokawa towards Shin-Yurigaoka
Location
- Location within Kanagawa Prefecture Location within Japan

Haruhino Station (はるひ野駅, Haruhino-eki) is a passenger railway station located in the Haruhino neighborhood of Asao-ku, Kawasaki, Kanagawa, Japan and operated by the private railway operator Odakyu Electric Railway.

== Lines ==
Haruhino Station is served by the Odakyu Tama Line, and is 4.8 kilometers (3.0 mi) from the terminus of the line at Shin-Yurigaoka.

== Station layout ==
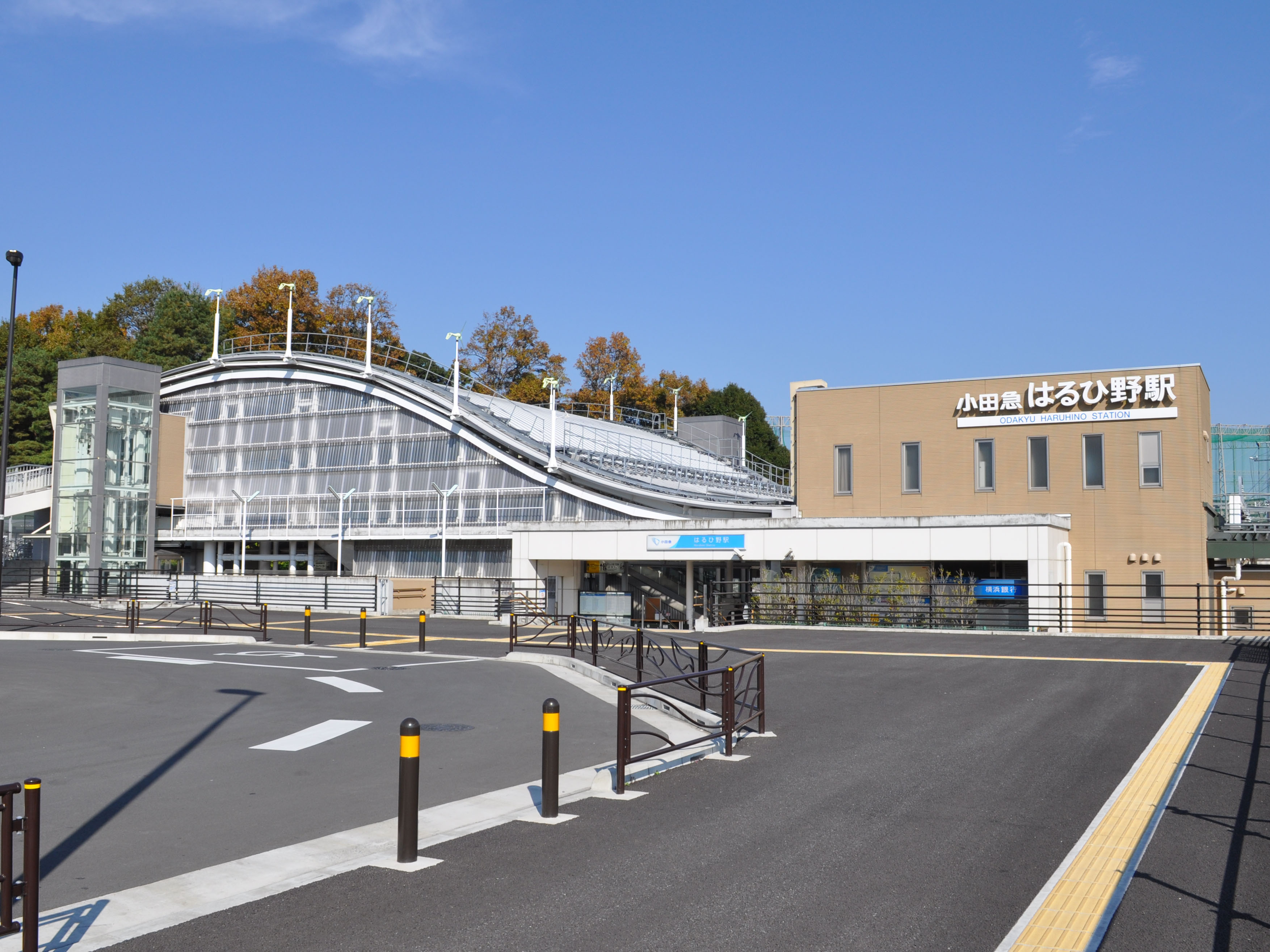
South entrance, November 2009

Haruhino Station is an elevated station with two opposed side platforms serving two tracks. The station building is elevated, and built on a cantilever extending over the platforms and tracks. The station uses a hybrid power system. For additional electric power, the station has solar cell on the roof and a wind power generator.

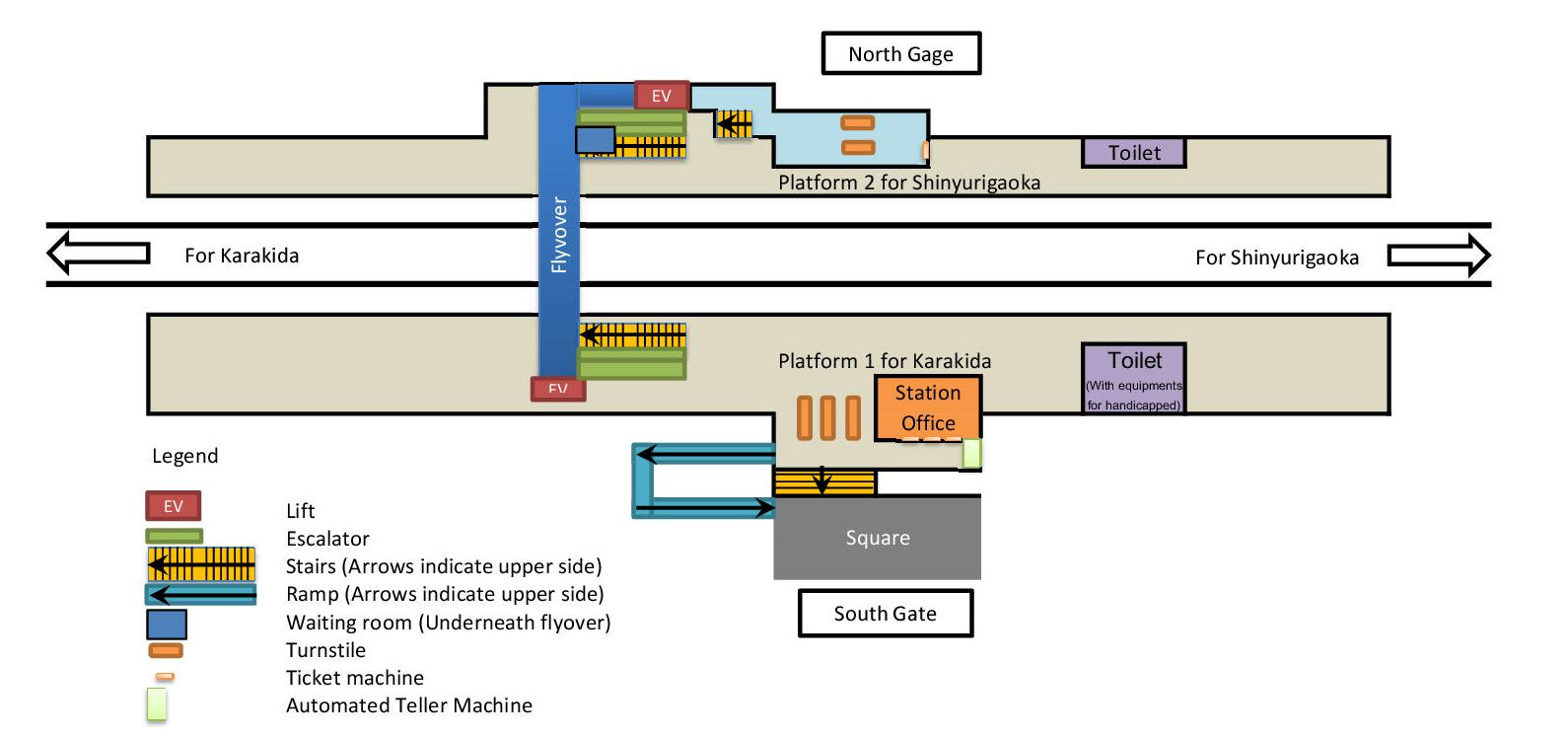
Haruhino station layout, as of December 2012

=== Facilities and accessibility ===
The station is fully wheelchair accessible, with escalators and elevators connecting the overbridge between the platforms. Universal access toilets are located on both platforms.

=== Platforms ===
1	■ Odakyu Tama Line	for Odakyu-Tama-Center and Karakida
2	■ Odakyu Tama Line	for Shin-Yurigaoka and Shinjuku

== History ==
Haruhino Station opened on December 11, 2004.

== Passenger statistics ==
In fiscal 2019, the station was used by an average of 10,048 passengers daily.

The passenger figures for previous years are as shown below.

Fiscal year	daily average
2005	2,461
2010	6,784
2015	9,325

== Surrounding area ==
- Wakabadai Station (Keio Sagamihara Line)

== See also ==
- List of railway stations in Japan
