= Wakabadai Station =

Railway station in Kawasaki, Kanagawa Prefecture, Japan

Wakabadai Station 若葉台駅

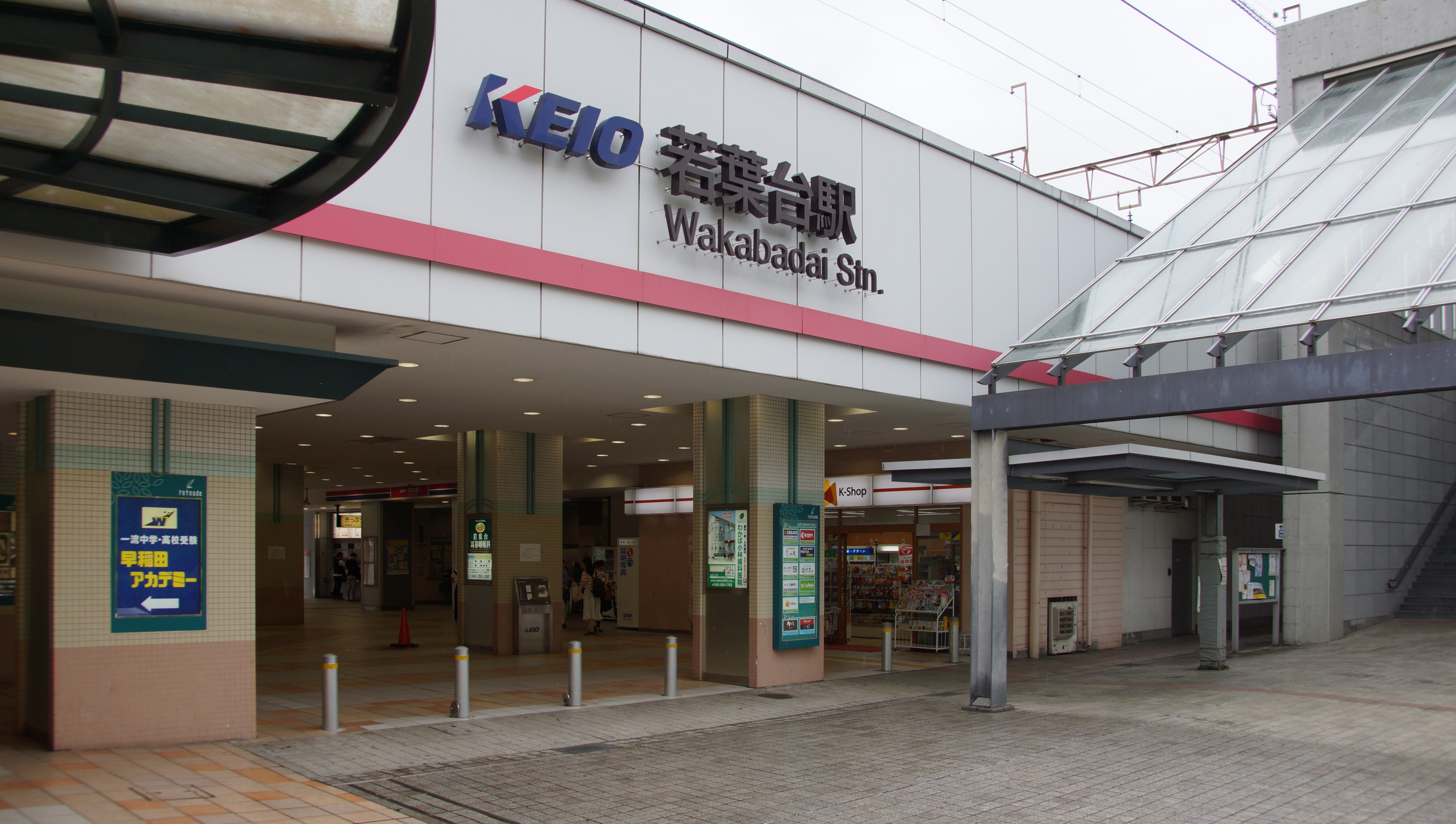
- The north entrance to Wakabadai Station in June 2017

General information
- Location: 609 Kurokawa, Asao-ku, Kawasaki-shi, Kanagawa-ken 215-0035; Japan
- Coordinates: 35°37′9.5″N 139°28′21″E
- Operator: Keio Corporation
- Line: Keio Sagamihara Line
- Distance: 8.8 km from Chōfu
- Platforms: 2 island platforms
- Tracks: 4
- Connections: Bus terminal

Construction
- Structure type: Elevated

Other information
- Station code: KO39
- Website: Official website

History
- Opened: 18 October 1974

Passengers
- FY2019: 26,954

Services
| Preceding station | Keio Corporation | Following station |
|---|---|---|
| Keiō-nagayama towards Hashimoto | Sagamihara Line Semi Express Rapid Local | Inagi towards Chōfu |
Location
- Location within Kanagawa Prefecture Location within Japan

Wakabadai Station (若葉台駅, Wakabadai-eki) is a passenger railway station located in the Kurokawa neighborhood of Asao-ku, Kawasaki, Kanagawa, Japan and operated by the private railway operator Keio Corporation.

== Lines ==
Wakabadai Station is served by the Keio Sagamihara Line, and is located 8.8 km (5.5 mi) from the starting point of the line at Chōfu Station.

== Station layout ==
The station has two elevated island platforms serving four tracks.

=== Platforms ===
| 1,2 | ■ Keio Sagamihara Line | for Tama-Center and Hashimoto |
| 3,4 | ■ Keio Sagamihara Line | for Chōfu, Meidaimae, and Shinjuku; Toei Shinjuku Line for Moto-Yawata |

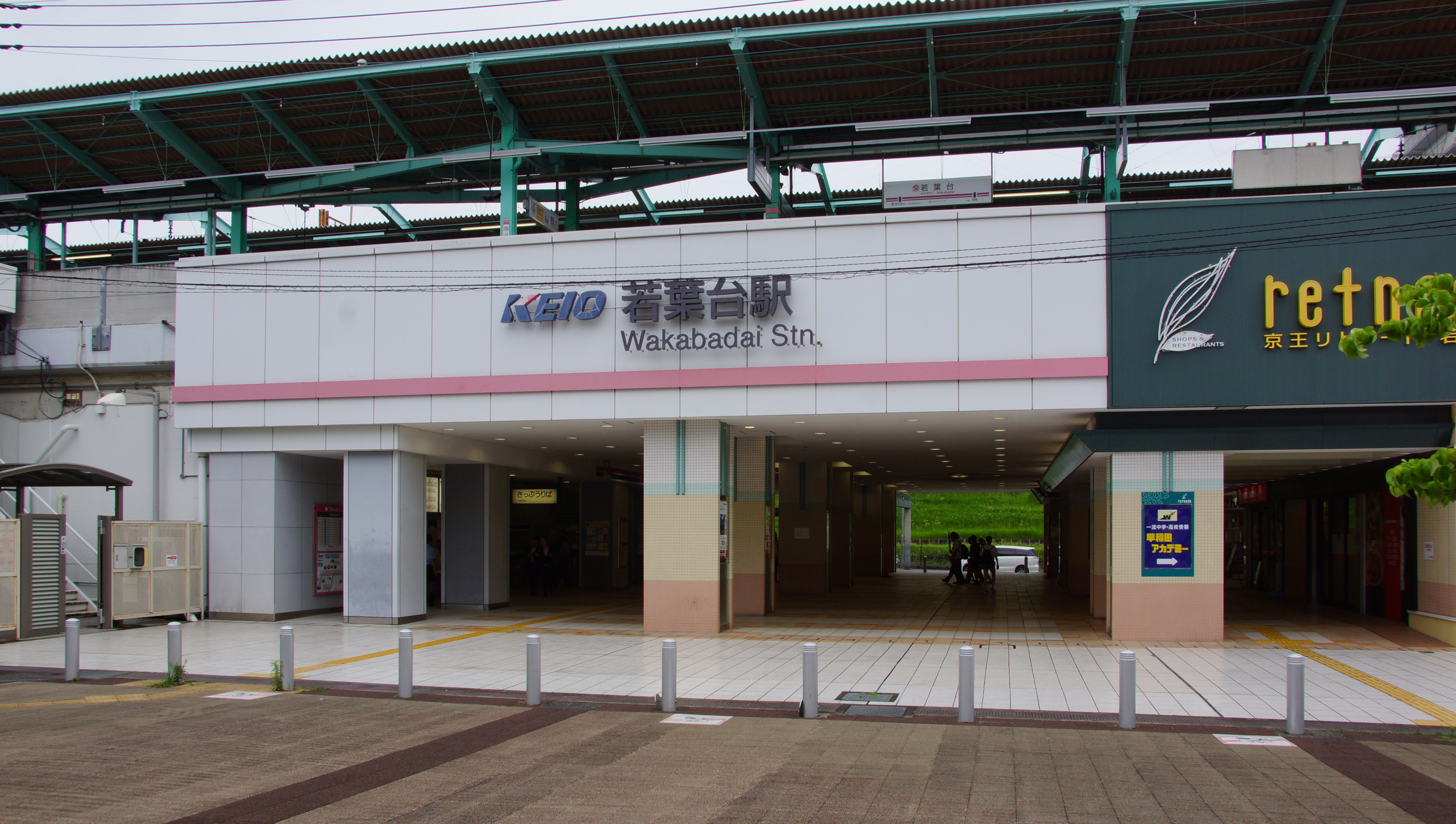
The south entrance in June 2017

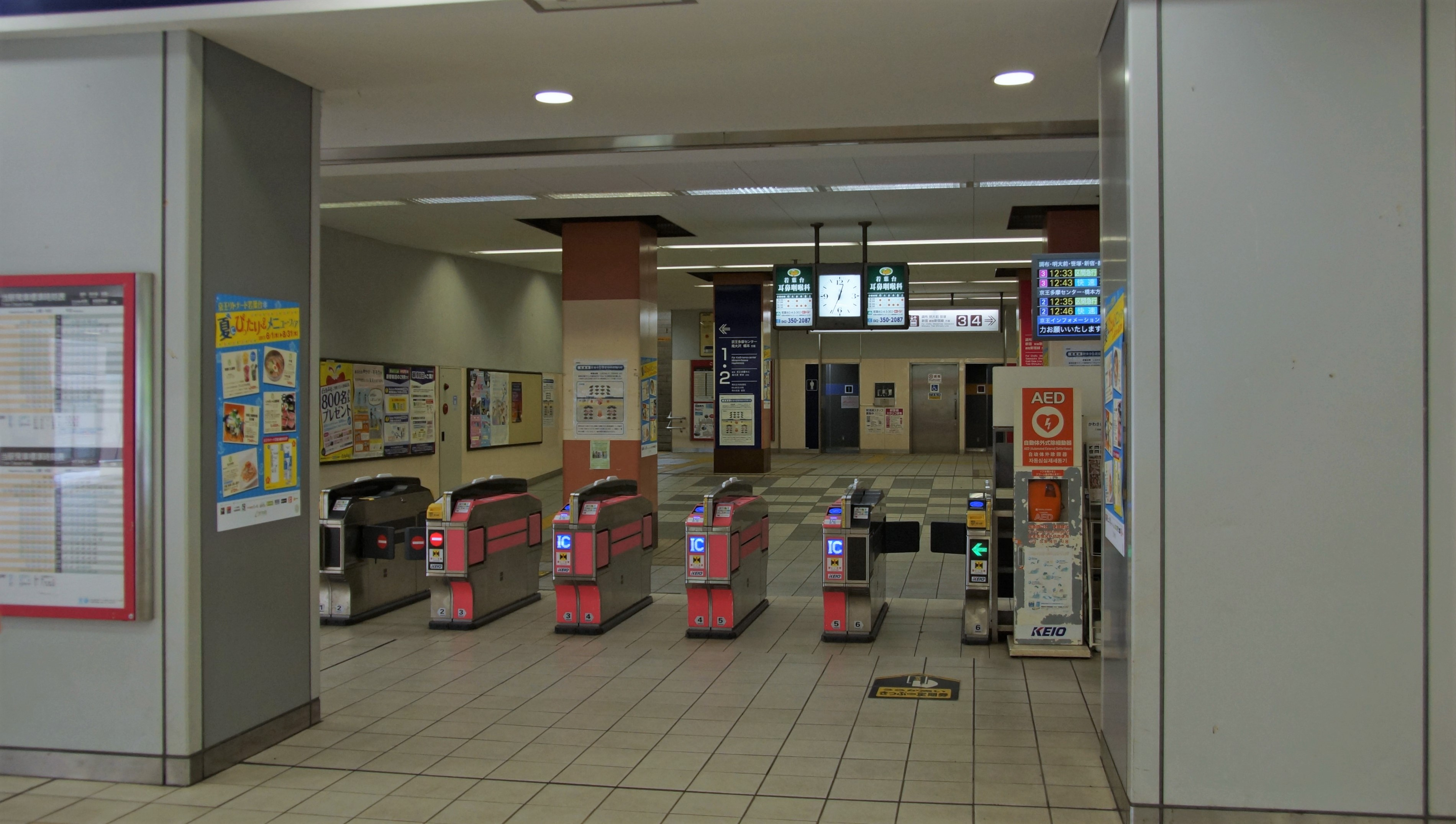
The ticket barriers in June 2017

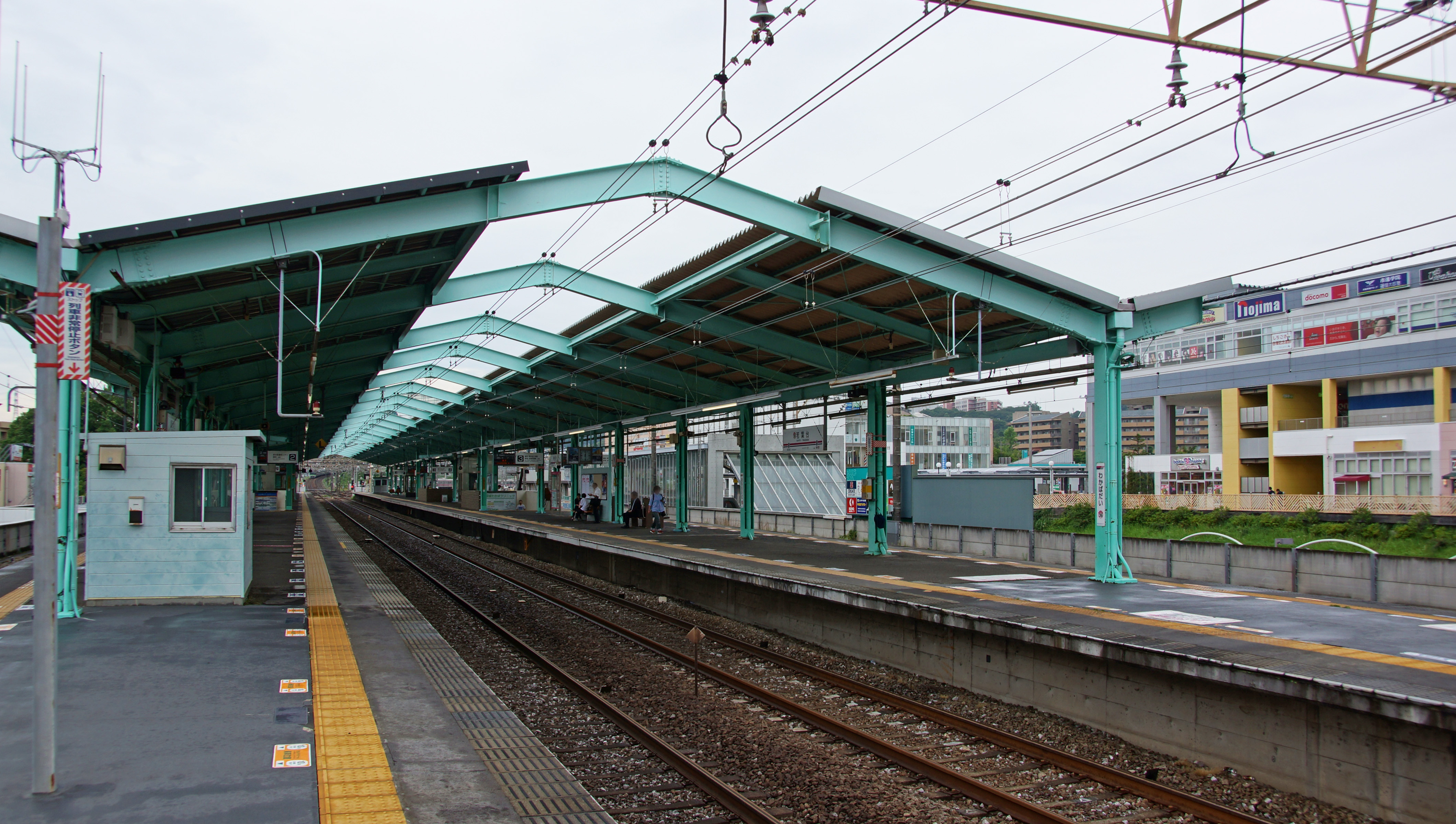
The platforms looking west in June 2017

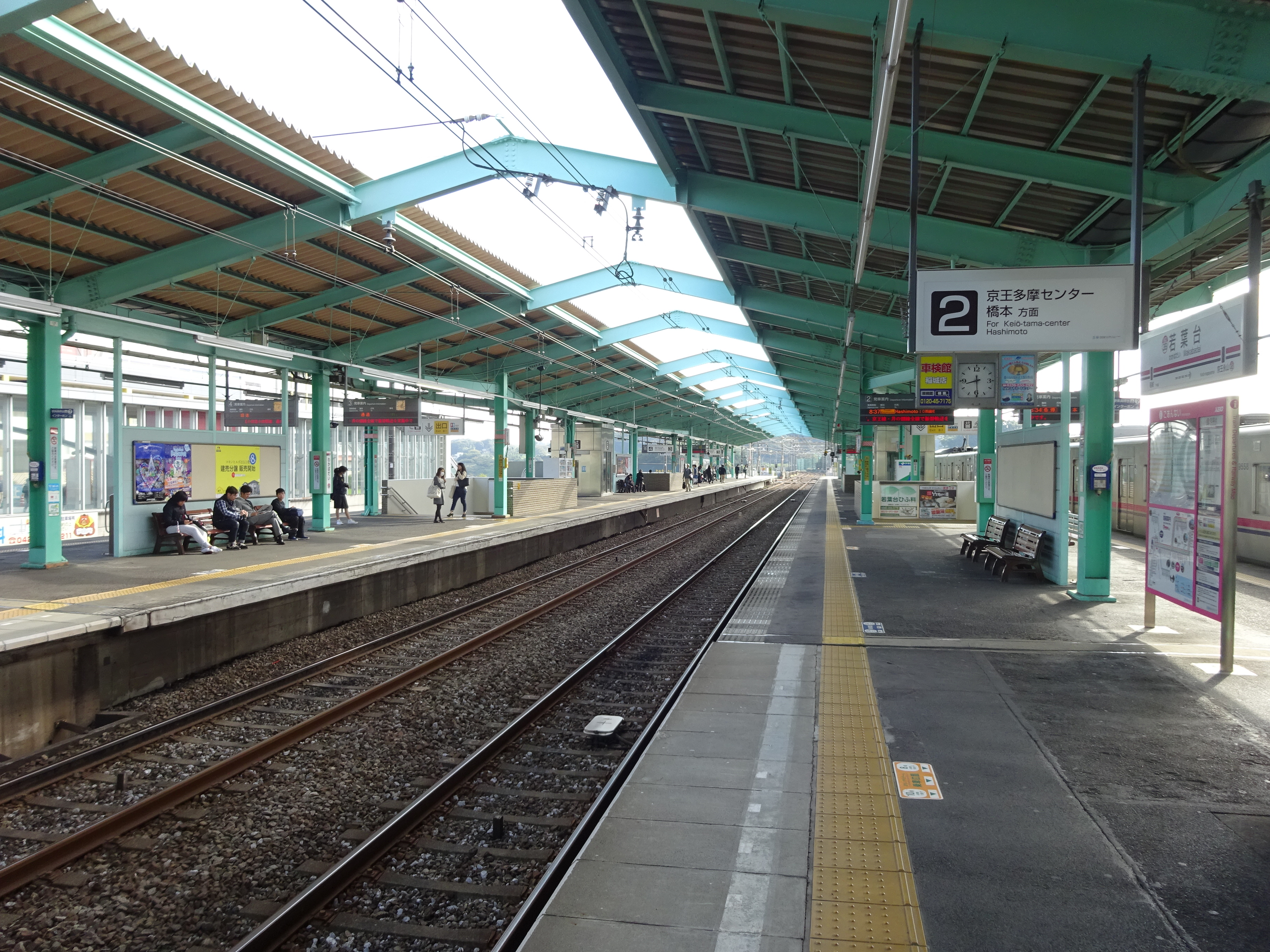
The platforms looking east in October 2016

== History ==
Wakabadai Station opened as an elevated station on October 18, 1974.

== Passenger statistics ==
In fiscal 2019, the station was used by an average of 26,954 passengers daily.

The passenger figures for previous years are as shown below.

| Fiscal year | daily average |
|---|---|
| 2005 | 16,254 |
| 2010 | 22,302 |
| 2015 | 25,920 |

== Surrounding area ==
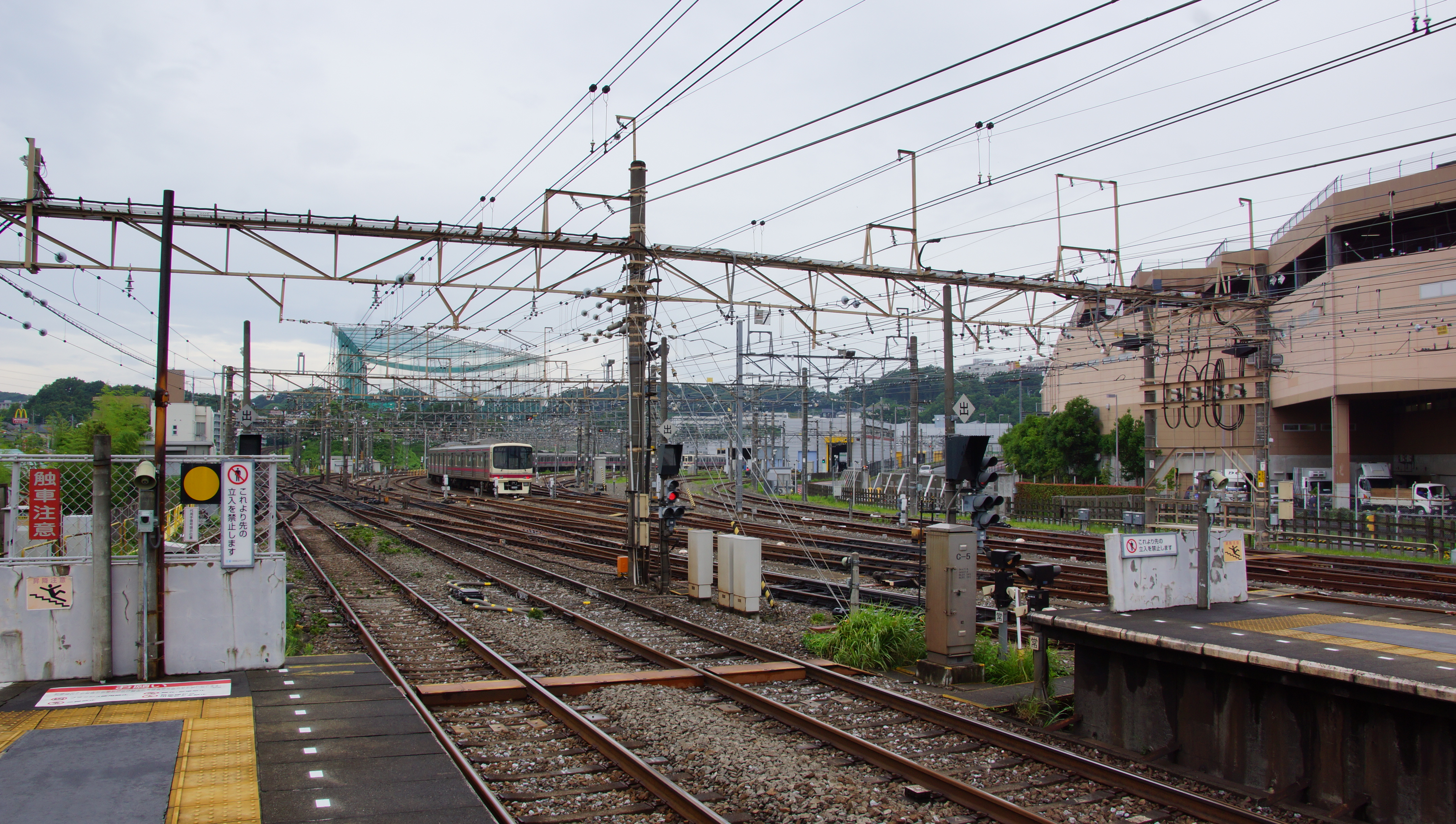
Wakabadai Maintenance Depot viewed from the west end of the station in June 2017

- Wakabadai Maintenance Depot
- Kurokawa Station (Odakyu Tama Line)
- Haruhino Station (Odakyu Tama Line)
- Tokyo Metropolitan Wakaba Comprehensive High School
- Inagi Wakabadai Elementary School
- Kodarayato Park

== See also ==
- List of railway stations in Japan
