= Nagayama Station (Tokyo) =

Railway station in Tama, Tokyo, Japan

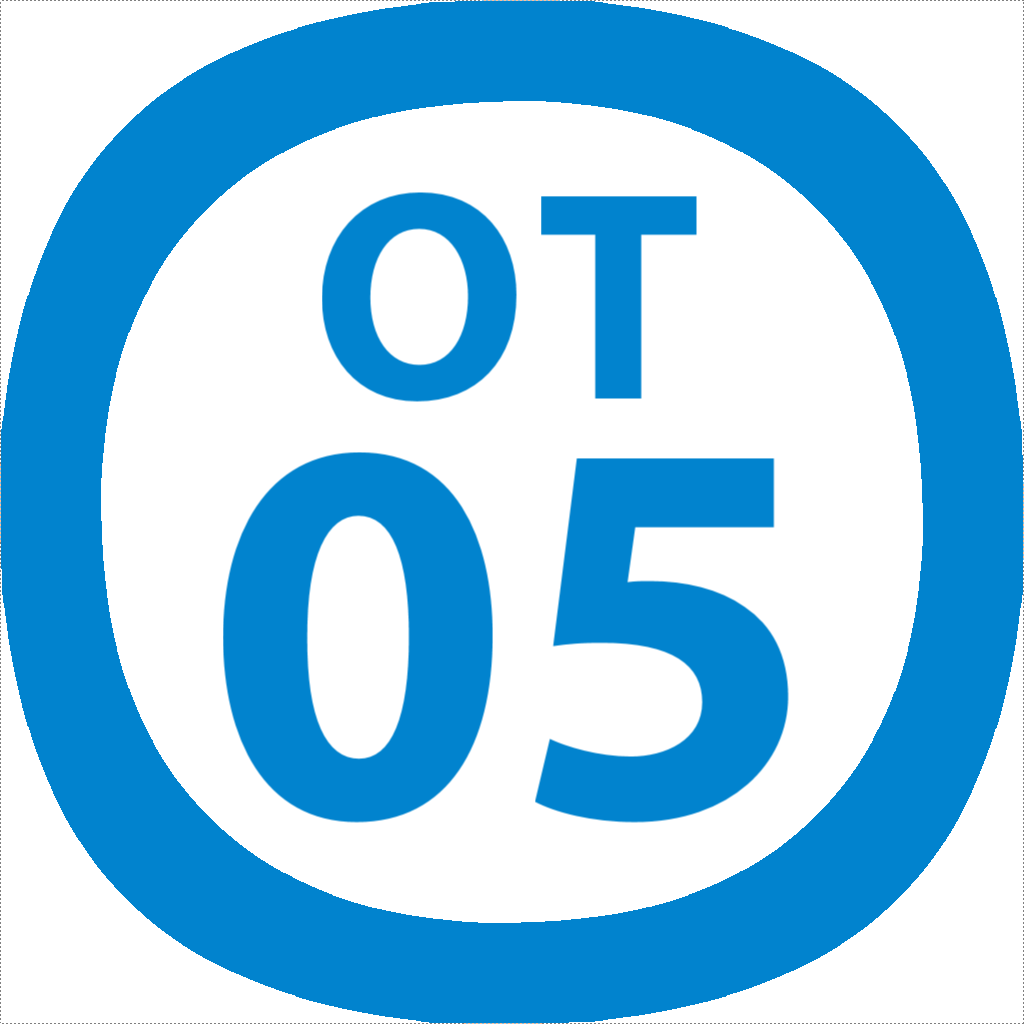
Nagayama Station 永山駅

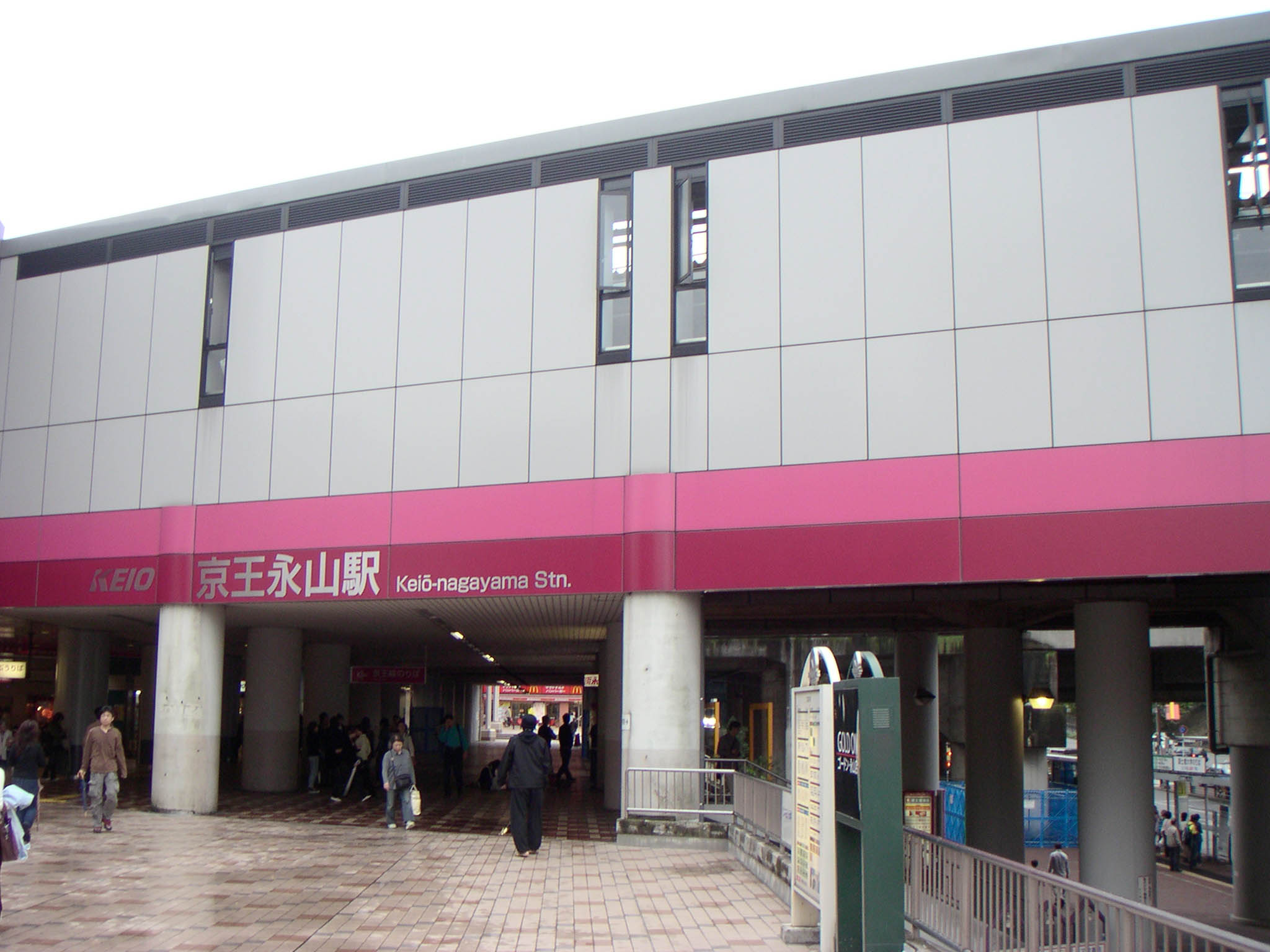
- Keiō-Nagayama Station

General information
- Location: 1 Nagayama, Tama-shi, Tokyo （東京都多摩市永山1） Japan
- Coordinates: 35°37′48″N 139°26′53″E
- Operator: Keiō Corporation; Odakyū Electric Railway
- Lines: Keio Sagamihara Line; Odakyū Tama Line
- Platforms: 4 side platforms
- Connections: Bus terminal

Other information
- Station code: KO40 (Keio), OT05 (Odakyu)

History
- Opened: June 1, 1974; 52 years ago

Passengers
- FY2019: Keiō: 46,013; Odakyū: 31,056 daily

Services
Preceding station	Keio Corporation	Following station
Keiō-tama-center towards Hashimoto	Keiō Liner	Meidaimae towards Shinjuku
Keiō-tama-center towards Hashimoto	Sagamihara Line Special Express Express	Keiō-inadazutsumi towards Chōfu
Keiō-tama-center towards Hashimoto	Sagamihara Line Semi Express Rapid Local	Wakabadai towards Chōfu
Preceding station	Odakyu	Following station
Odakyū Tama-Center towards Karakida	Tama Line Rapid Express	Kurihira towards Shin-Yurigaoka
Odakyū Tama-Center One-way operation	Tama Line Commuter Express	Kurihira towards Shin-Yurigaoka
Odakyū Tama-Center towards Karakida	Tama Line Express Local	Haruhino towards Shin-Yurigaoka
Location
- Location within Tokyo Location within Japan

Nagayama Station (永山駅, Nagayama-eki) is an interchange passenger railway station located in the city of Tama, Tokyo, Japan operated jointly by the private railway companies Keio Corporation and Odakyū Electric Railway. The stations are formally known as Keiō-Nagayama (Keiō) and Odakyū-Nagayama.

== Lines ==
Nagayama Station is served by the Keiō Sagamihara Line, and is 11.4 kilometers (7.1 mi) from the terminus of the line at Chōfu and 35.6 kilometers (22.1 mi) from Shinjuku Station in downtown Tokyo. On the Odakyū Tama Line, it is 6.8 kilometers (4.2 mi) from the terminus of the line at Shin-Yurigaoka Station and 28.3 kilometers (17.6 mi) from Shinjuku Station.

== Station layout ==
This station consists of two sets of elevated opposed side platforms serving a total of four tracks. All trains stop at this station.

=== Keiō Corporation (Keiō-Nagayama Station) platforms ===
1	Keiō Sagamihara Line	for Keiō-Tama-Center and Hashimoto
2	Keiō Sagamihara Line	for Chōfu, Meidaimae, Sasazuka, and Shinjuku; Toei Shinjuku Line for Motoyawata

=== Odakyū Electric Railway (Odakyū-Nagayama Station) platforms ===
1	Odakyū Tama Line	for Odakyū-Tama-Center and Karakida
2	Odakyū Tama Line	for Shin-Yurigaoka, Yoyogi-Uehara, and Shinjuku; Tokyo Metro Chiyoda Line for Ayase; Joban Line for Abiko and Toride

== History ==
- June 1, 1974: Odakyū-Nagayama Station opens as a local stop with the extension of the Odakyū Tama Line.
- October 18, 1974: Keiō-Nagayama Station opens as a local and rapid stop with the extension of the Keiō Sagamihara Line.
- December 2, 2000: Special express Homeway and express trains begin service on the Tama Line, stopping at Nagayama.
- March 27, 2001: On the Sagamihara Line, express trains begin service, stopping at Nagayama; special express trains are abolished.
- March 23, 2002: Tama Express trains begin service on the Tama Line, stopping at Nagayama.
- December 11, 2004: Section semi-express trains begin service on the Tama Line, stopping at Nagayama.
- March 2006: Odakyū-Nagayama Station renewal construction completed.
- March 15, 2008: Special express Metro Homeway trains begin service on the Tama Line, stopping at Nagayama.

== Passenger statistics ==
In fiscal 2019, the Keio station was used by an average of 46,013 passengers daily, making it the 20th busiest station in the Keio system. During the same period, the Odakyu station was used by an average of 31,056 passengers daily, making it the 37th busiest station in the Odakyu system.

== Surrounding area ==
The station sits at the heart of the planned Tama New Town suburb, complementing the neighboring Tama-Center Station.

== See also ==
- List of railway stations in Japan
