= Kōzō-in =

Coordinates: 35.6388°N 139.4293°E

Kōzō-in (高蔵院) is a Buddhist temple in Tama, Tokyo Prefecture, Japan. It is dedicated to Yakushi Nyorai.

== See also ==
- Thirteen Buddhas of Tama
