= Kurokawa Station (Kanagawa) =

Railway station in Kawasaki, Kanagawa Prefecture, Japan

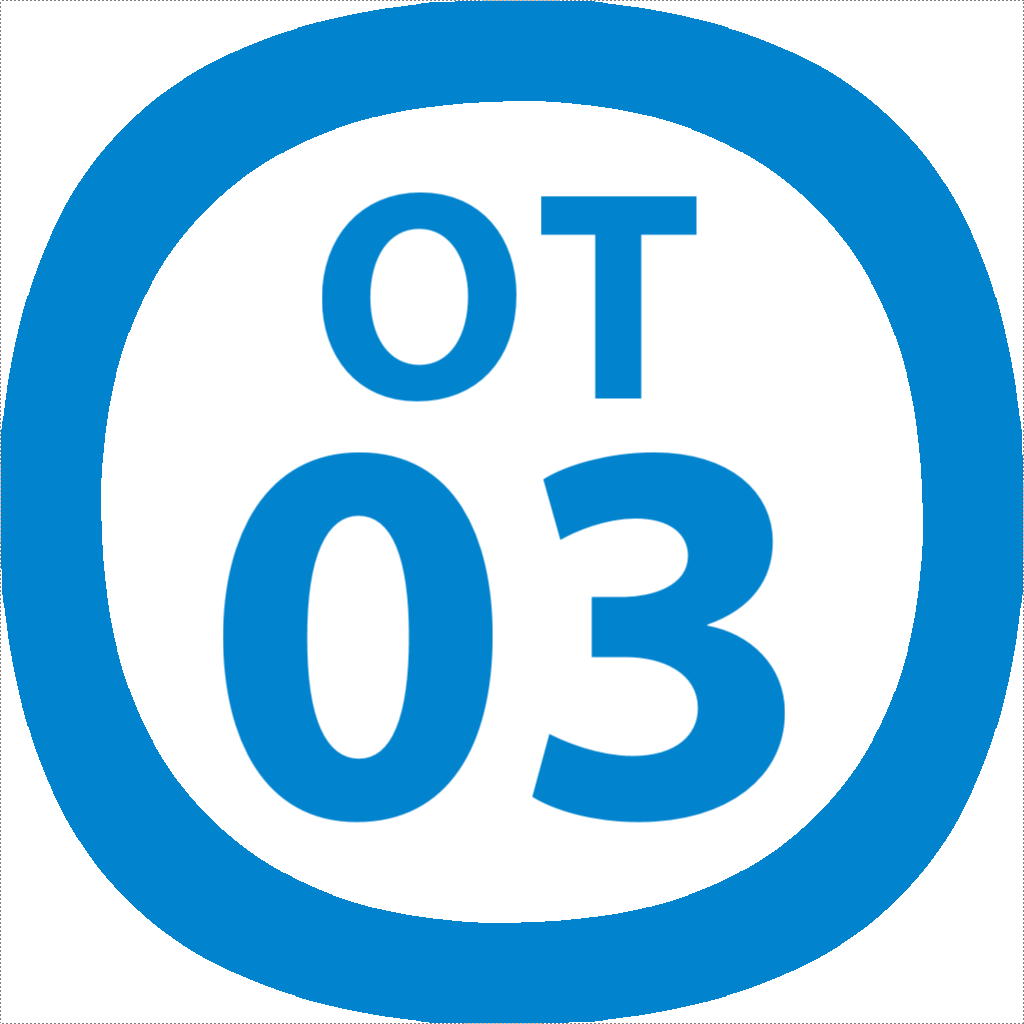
Kurokawa Station 黒川駅

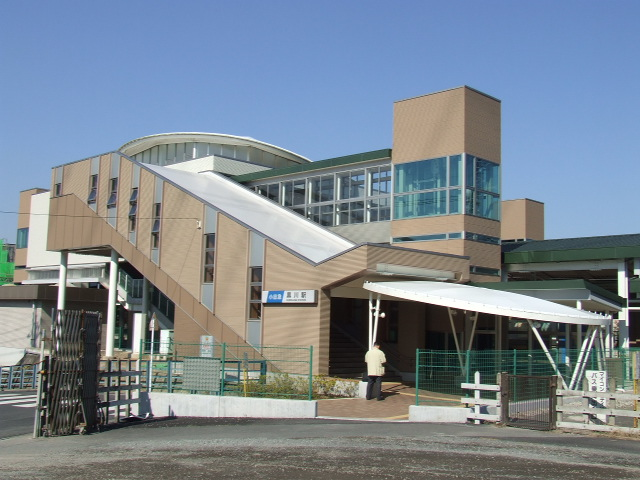
- South Exit of Kurokawa Station

General information
- Location: Minami Kurokawa 4-1, Asao-ku, Kawasaki-shi, Kanagawa-ken 215-0034; Japan
- Coordinates: 35°36′47″N 139°28′15″E
- Operator: Odakyu Electric Railway
- Line: Odakyu Odawara Line
- Distance: 4.1 km from Shin-Yurigaoka
- Platforms: 2 side platforms
- Connections: Bus stop

Other information
- Station code: OT03
- Website: Official website

History
- Opened: June 1, 1974; 52 years ago

Passengers
- FY2022: 8,303

Services
Preceding station	Odakyu	Following station
Haruhino towards Karakida	Tama Line Express Local	Kurihira towards Shin-Yurigaoka
Location
- Location within Kanagawa Prefecture Location within Japan

Kurokawa Station (黒川駅, Kurokawa-eki) is a passenger railway station located in the Kurokawa neighborhood of Asao-ku, Kawasaki, Kanagawa, Japan and operated by the private railway operator Odakyu Electric Railway.

== Lines ==
Kurokawa Station is served by the Odakyu Tama Line, and is 4.1 kilometers (2.5 mi) from the terminus of the line at Shin-Yurigaoka.

== Station layout ==
The station consists of two opposed side platforms serving two tracks, with an elevated station building over the platforms and tracks.

=== Platforms ===
1	■ Odakyu Tama Line	For Odakyu-Tama-Center and Karakida
2	■ Odakyu Tama Line	For Shin-Yurigaoka and Shinjuku

== History ==
Kurokawa Station was opened on June 1, 1974. In 2004 the station became a stop for Section Semi-Express trains. The station building was remodeled in 2006.

== Passenger statistics ==
In fiscal 2022, the station was used by an average of 8,303 passengers daily.

The passenger figures for previous years are as shown below.

Fiscal year	daily average
2005	6,064
2010	8,307
2015	8,245

== See also ==
- List of railway stations in Japan
