= Kurihira Station =

Railway station in Kawasaki, Kanagawa Prefecture, Japan

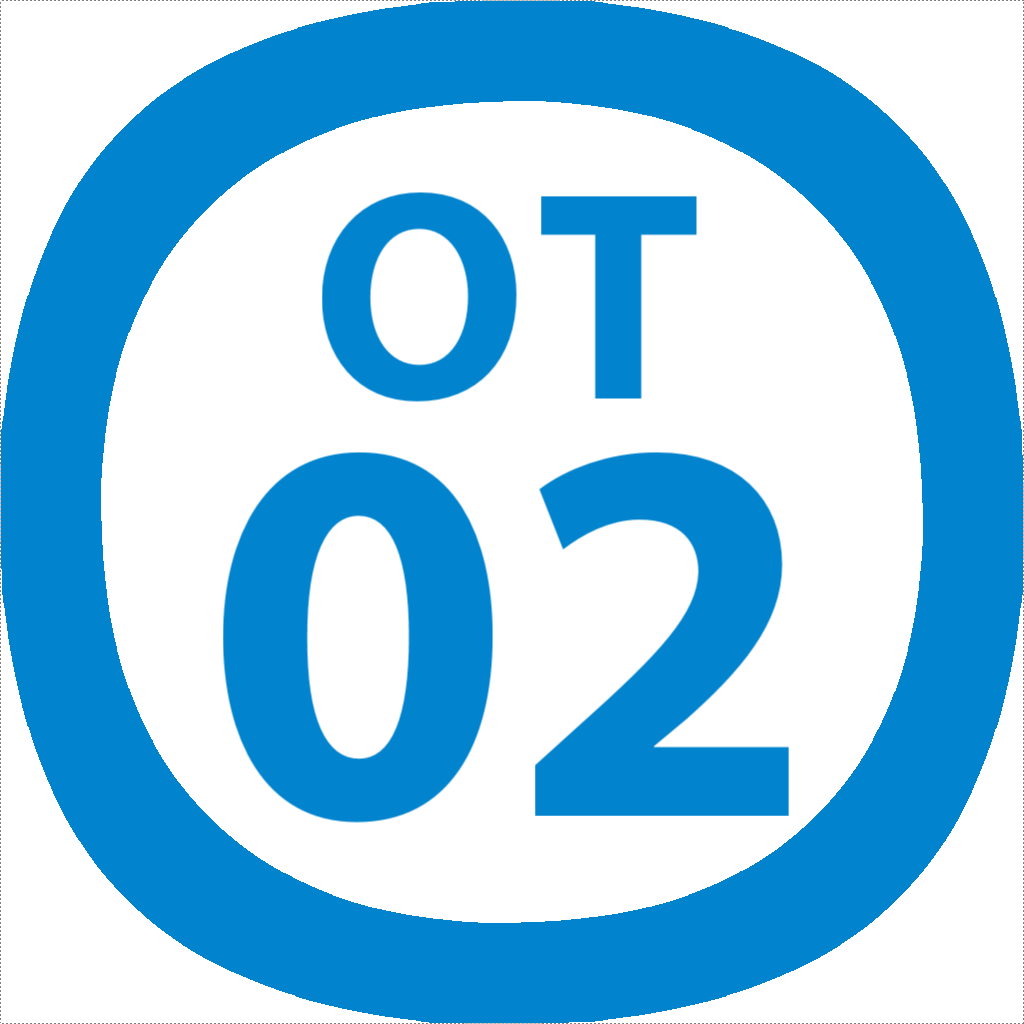
Kurihira Station 栗平駅

- The north entrance to Kurihira Station in February 2026

General information
- Location: 2-1-1 Kurihira, Asao-ku, Kawasaki-shi, Kanagawa-ken 215-0031; Japan
- Coordinates: 35.605987°N 139.480909°E
- Operator: Odakyu Electric Railway
- Line: Odakyu Odawara Line
- Distance: 2.8 km from Shin-Yurigaoka
- Platforms: 2 side platforms
- Tracks: 2
- Connections: Bus stop

Construction
- Structure type: Elevated

Other information
- Station code: OT-2
- Website: Official website

History
- Opened: June 1, 1974; 52 years ago

Passengers
- FY2019: 24,606

Services
Preceding station	Odakyu	Following station
Odakyū-Nagayama towards Karakida	Tama Line Rapid Express	Shin-Yurigaoka Terminus
Odakyū-Nagayama One-way operation	Tama Line Commuter Express	Shin-Yurigaoka Terminus
Kurokawa towards Karakida	Tama Line Express Local	Satsukidai towards Shin-Yurigaoka
Location
- Location within Kanagawa Prefecture Location within Japan

Kurihira Station (栗平駅, Kurihira-eki) is a passenger railway station located in the Kurihira neighborhood of Asao-ku, Kawasaki, Kanagawa, Japan and operated by the private railway operator Odakyu Electric Railway.

== Lines ==
Kurihira Station is served by the Odakyu Tama Line, and is 2.8 kilometers (1.7 mi) from the terminus of the line at Shin-Yurigaoka.

== Station layout ==
The station consists of two opposed side platforms serving two tracks, with an elevated station building over the platforms and tracks.

=== Platforms ===
1	Odakyu Tama Line	for Odakyu-Tama-Center and Karakida
2	Odakyu Tama Line	for Shin-Yurigaoka and Shinjuku

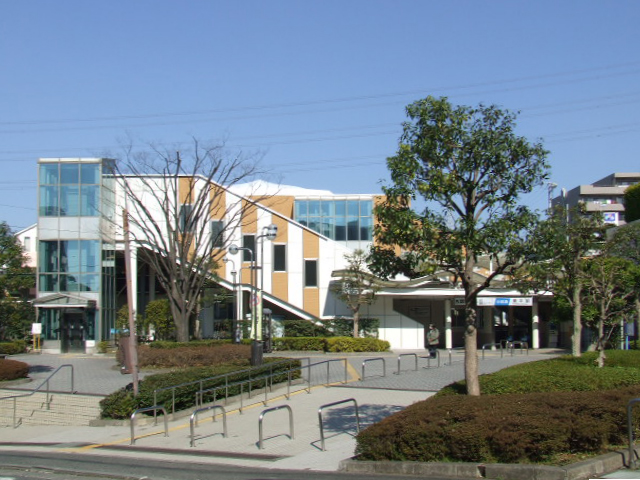
The south entrance in February 2007

The platforms in February 2026

== History ==
Kurihira Station was opened on 1 June 1974. In the 2002, the station became a stop for the Tama Express, and from 2004 for the Section Semi-Express trains. The station building was remodeled in 2006.

== Passenger statistics ==
In fiscal 2019, the station was used by an average of 24,606 passengers daily.

The passenger figures for previous years are as shown below.

Fiscal year	daily average
2005	20,743
2010	21,532
2015	22,491

== Surrounding area ==
- Kurihira Post Office
- Kawasaki City Kurigidai Elementary School
- Kawasaki City Shiratori Junior High School

== See also ==
- List of railway stations in Japan
