= Satsukidai Station =

Railway station in Kawasaki, Kanagawa Prefecture, Japan

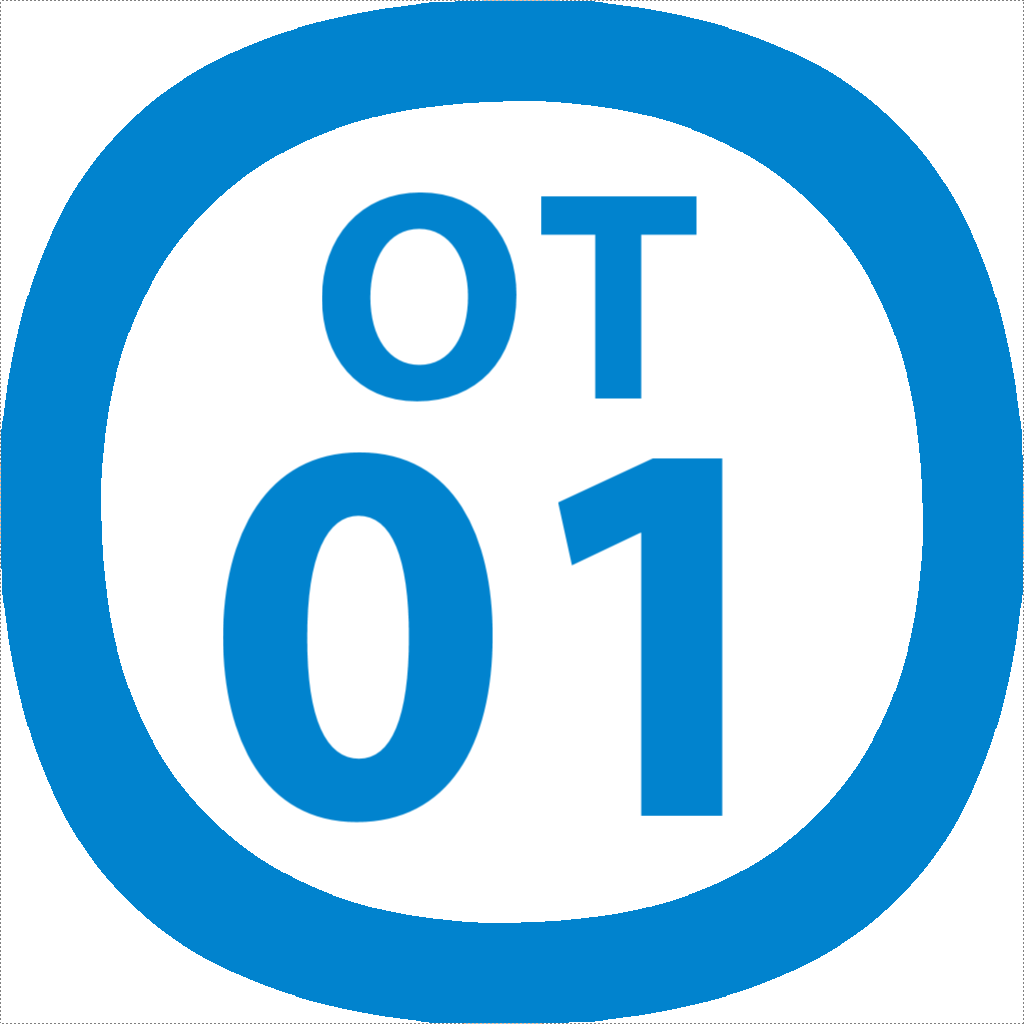
Satsukidai Station 五月台駅

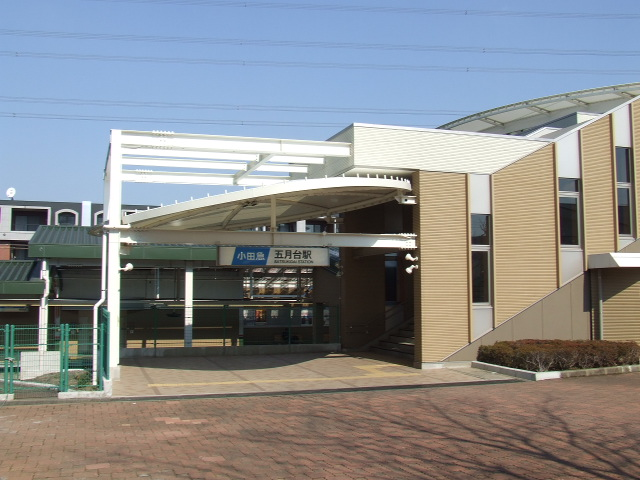
- South Exit of Satsukidai Station

General information
- Location: Gorikida 3-chōme 18-1, Asao-ku, Kawasaki-shi, Kanagawa-ken 215-0025; Japan
- Coordinates: 35.6002°N 139.4935°E
- Operator: Odakyu Electric Railway
- Line: Odakyu Odawara Line
- Distance: 1.5 km from Shin-Yurigaoka
- Platforms: 2 side platforms
- Connections: Bus stop

Other information
- Station code: OT01
- Website: Official website

History
- Opened: June 1, 1974; 52 years ago

Passengers
- FY2019: 10,192

Services
Preceding station	Odakyu	Following station
Kurihira towards Karakida	Tama Line Express Local	Shin-Yurigaoka Terminus
Location
- Location within Kanagawa Prefecture Location within Japan

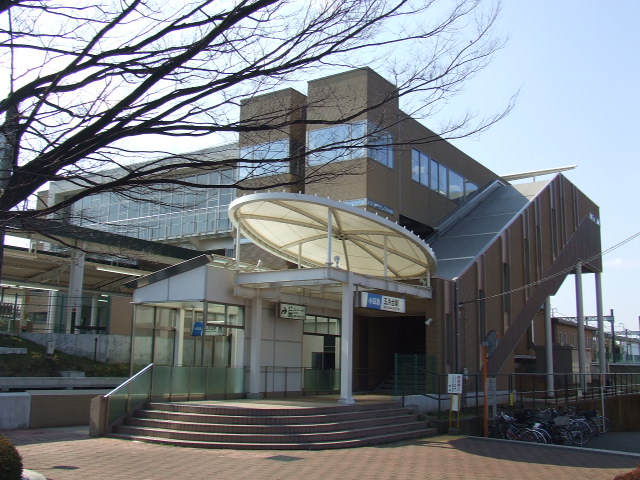
North Exit of Satsukidai Station

Satsukidai Station (五月台駅, Satsukidai-eki) is a passenger railway station located in the Gorikida neighborhood of Asao-ku, Kawasaki, Kanagawa, Japan and operated by the private railway operator Odakyu Electric Railway.

== Lines ==
Satsukidai Station is served by the Odakyu Tama Line, and is 1.5 kilometers (0.93 mi) from the terminus of the line at Shin-Yurigaoka..

== Station layout ==
The station consists of two opposed side platforms serving two tracks, with an elevated station building over the platforms and tracks.

== Platforms ==
1	■ Odakyu Tama Line	For Shin-Yurigaoka and Shinjuku
2	■ Odakyu Tama Line	For Odakyu-Tama-Center and Karakida

== History ==
Satsukidai Station was opened on June 1, 1974. In the year 2004 the station became a Section Semi-Express stop. The station building was remodeled in 2006.

== Passenger statistics ==
In fiscal 2019, the station was used by an average of 10,192 passengers daily.

The passenger figures for previous years are as shown below.

Fiscal year	daily average
2005	8,394
2010	9,496
2015	10,083

== Surrounding area ==
- Kawasaki Shiritsu Katahira Elementary School
- Kawasaki Shiritsu Shiratori Junior High School
- Kakio Gakuen

== See also ==
- List of railway stations in Japan
