= Nagayama Station =

Nagayama Station is the name of multiple train stations in Japan.

- Nagayama Station (Aichi) - (長山駅) in Aichi Prefecture
- Nagayama Station (Hokkaidō) - (永山駅) in Hokkaidō Prefecture
- Keiō-Nagayama Station - (京王永山駅) in Tokyo
- Odakyū-Nagayama Station - (小田急永山駅) in Tokyo

== See also ==
- Kita-Nagayama Station
