= Asao-ku =

Asao 麻生区
- Ward
- Asao Ward
- Flag Seal

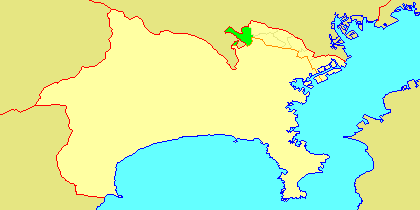
- Location of Asao in Kanagawa

- Location in Japan
- Coordinates: 35°36′14″N 139°30′21″E
- Country: Japan
- Region: Kantō
- Prefecture: Kanagawa

Area
  - Total: 23.28 km^{2} (8.99 sq mi)

Population (March 2010)
  - Total: 167,792
  - Density: 7,210/km^{2} (18,700/sq mi)
- Time zone: UTC+09:00 (JST)
- City hall address: 1-5-1 Manpukuji, Asao-ku Kawasaki-shi, Kanagawa-ken; 215-8570
- Website: www.city.kawasaki.jp/73/73soumu/index.htm

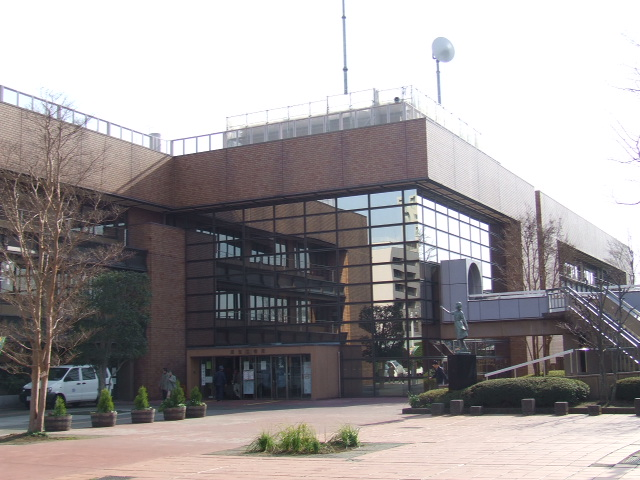
Asao Ward Office

Asao-ku (麻生区) is one of the seven wards of the city of Kawasaki in Kanagawa Prefecture, Japan. As of 2010, the ward had an estimated population of 167,792 and a density of 7,210 persons per km^{2}. The total area was 23.28 km^{2}.

== Geography ==
Asao Ward is located in eastern Kanagawa Prefecture, in the far western corner of the city of Kawasaki, bordering on Tokyo. It is bordered to the north by the Tama River. In March 1913, a fossil tooth from a Parastegodon (similar to the Stegodon genus) was found in what is now Yurigaoka 2–19 in the upper sedimentary layers of mudstone. It is thought to have been from the late Pliocene period. Most of what is now the city of Kawasaki was under water during this period, so the fossil indicates that the Asao area was above water and perhaps marked the shoreline.

=== Surrounding municipalities ===
- Tama-ku, Kawasaki
- Miyamae-ku, Kawasaki
- Aoba-ku, Yokohama
- Machida, Tokyo
- Tama, Tokyo
- Inagi, Tokyo

== History ==
Rice was grown in the area as early as the Yayoi period. The name "Asao" appears in Heian period records, and as the name implies, the area was noted for its production of hemp. Under Ritsuryō system, it was part of Musashi Province. By the Edo period It was administered as tenryō territory controlled directly by the Tokugawa shogunate, but administered through various hatamoto, and was noted for its production of charcoal. After the Meiji Restoration, the area was divided between Tachibana District and Tsuzuki District in the new Kanagawa Prefecture on April 1, 1889. These areas were annexed by the neighboring city of Kawasaki from 1938 to 1939.

The area became part of a huge government sponsored housing project from the 1950s and 1960s, resulting in the Yurigaoka Danchi and other suburban developments. The area became part of Tama Ward with the division of the city of Kawasaki into wards from April 1972. In July 1982, Asao Ward was separated from Tama Ward. A new Ward Office was completed in 1997.

== Economy ==
Asao Ward is largely a regional commercial center and bedroom community for central Kawasaki and Tokyo. Traditionally (through the Meiji period), the area was known for its production of Japanese persimmons.

=== Company headquarters ===
- Sigma Corporation

== Transportation ==
=== Railroads ===
- Keiō Corporation –Keiō Sagamihara Line
  - Wakabadai
- Odakyu Electric Railway –Odakyū Odawara Line
  - Yurigaoka - Shin-Yurigaoka - Kakio
- Odakyu Electric Railway –Odakyū Tama Line
  - Shin-Yurigaoka - Satsukidai - Kurihira - Kurokawa- Haruhino

=== Highways ===
==== Prefecture roads ====
- Kanagawa Prefectural Road 3
- Kanagawa Prefectural Road 12
- Kanagawa Prefectural Road 19
- Kanagawa Prefectural Road 124
- Kanagawa Prefectural Road 137

== Education ==
- Den-en Chofu University
- Showa Academia Musicae
- Tokyo City University – Department of Nuclear Engineering

The Kawasaki City Board of Education (川崎市育委員会) operates municipal elementary and junior high schools.

Municipal junior high schools:

- Asao (麻生中学校)
- Haruhino (はるひ野中学校)
- Kakio (柿生中学校)
- Kanahodo (金程中学校)
- Nagasawa (長沢中学校)
- Nishiikuta (西生田中学校)
- Ozenji Chuo (王禅寺中央中学校)
- Shiratori (白鳥中学校)

Former junior high schools:

- Hakusan (白山中学校) - Closed March 31, 2008 (Heisei 20)
- Ozenji (王禅寺中学校) - Closed March 31, 2008 (Heisei 20)

Municipal elementary schools:

- Asao (麻生小学校)
- Chiyogaoka (千代ヶ丘小学校)
- Haruhino (はるひ野小学校)
- Higashi Kakio (東柿生小学校)
- Kakio (柿生小学校)
- Kanahodo (金程小学校)
- Katahira (片平小学校)
- Kurigidai (栗木台小学校)
- Minami Yurigaoka (南百合丘小学校)
- Nagasawa (長沢小学校)
- Nijigaoka (虹ヶ丘小学校)
- Nishiikuta (西生田小学校)
- Okagami (岡上小学校)
- Ozenji Chuo (王禅寺中央小学校)
- Shinpukuji (真福寺小学校)
- Yurigaoka (百合丘小学校)

Former elementary schools:

- Hakusan (白山小学校) - Closed March 31, 2009 (Heisei 21)
- Ozenji (王禅寺小学校) - Closed March 31, 2009 (Heisei 21)

== Notable people from Asao Ward ==
- Takefusa Kubo, football player
- Yuto Ozeki, football player
- Ayumi Shibata, singer
- Chinami Tokunaga, singer
