= Thirteen Buddhas of Tama =

The Thirteen Buddhas of Tama (多摩十三仏霊場｜Tama jūsan butsu reijō) is a pilgrimages route of 13 Buddhist temples in Tama, Tokyo. Each temple is dedicated to one of the Thirteen Buddhas.

== Directory ==
Number	Temple	Dedication	Address
1.	Kanzō-in	Fudō-myōō	1-3-15 Higashiterakata, Tama City, Tokyo
2.	Enmei-ji	Shaka Nyorai	5-24-3 Sekido, Tama City, Tokyo
3.	Hōsen-in	Monju Bosatsu	4-9-5 Higashiterakata, Tama City, Tokyo
4.	Tōfuku-ji	Fugen Bosatsu	2-1-15 Ochiai, Tama City, Tokyo
5.	Kannon-ji	Jizō Bosatsu	5-31-11 Sekido, Tama City, Tokyo
6.	Daifuku-ji	Miroku Bosatsu	1-55-1 Kaitori, Tama City, Tokyo
7.	Kōzō-in	Yakushi Nyorai	7-2-8 Wada, Tama City, Tokyo
8.	Kōsai-ji	Kannon Bosatsu	2-24-1 Renkoji, Tama City, Tokyo
9.	Nagayama Amida-dō	Seishi Bosatsu	1-8-8 Nagayama, Tama City, Tokyo
10.	Shinmyō-ji	Amida Nyorai	1-38-1 Ichinomiya, Tama City, Tokyo
11.	Kisshō-in	Ashuku Nyorai	1-51-2 Toyogaoka, Tama City, Tokyo
12.	Jutoku-ji	Dainichi Nyorai	4-26-3 Sakuragaoka, Tama City, Tokyo
13.	Myōō-ji	Kokūzō Bosatsu	1-3-1 Minamino, Tama City, Tokyo

== See also ==
- Thirteen Buddhas
