= Yurigaoka =

Neighborhood in Asao-ku, Kawasaki City, Kanagawa Prefecture, Japan

Coordinates: 35°36′15.43″N 139°31′13.14″E

Yurigaoka (百合丘, also written as 百合ケ丘) is a neighborhood in Asao-ku, Kawasaki, Kanagawa Prefecture which consists of 1 to 3-chōme. The population was 8009 (4189 households) as of March 2009.

== Name ==
Yurigaoka is said to be named after the Yurigaoka Danchi housing development project in the 1950s, which was in turn named after the Goldband lily (Lilium auratum) which once grew in abundance around the district. The Goldband lily is the official flower of Kanagawa Prefecture.

== History ==
In March 1913, a fossil tooth from a Parastegodon (similar to the Stegodon genus) was found in what is now Yurigaoka 2-19 in the upper sedimentary layers of mudstone. It is thought to have been from the late Pliocene period. Most of what is now the city of Kawasaki was under water during this period, so the fossil indicates that the Yurigaoka area was above water and perhaps marked the shoreline.

Rice was grown in the area as early as the Yayoi period. Around the 8th century, hemp grown in the district was offered as tribute to the Japanese Imperial Court.

First undergoing large-scale housing development in the 1950s, the area saw a population increase after the completion of Yurigaoka Station in 1960.

== Geography ==
The southern end of the neighborhood is marked by the Yurigaoka Danchi; in the north lies the main shopping strip and the Odakyu Railway. The highest point (117.8 m above sea level) is at Kōbō no matsu Park (弘法松公園) in Yurigaoka 2-10, opposite the Yurigaoka Catholic Church.

== Transportation ==
- Odakyū Odawara Line, Yurigaoka Station
