= Den-en Chofu University =

Higher education institution in Kanagawa Prefecture, Japan

Coordinates: 35°35′43″N 139°31′28″E

Den-en Chōfu University
- 田園調布学園大学; Denen chōfu gakuen daigaku
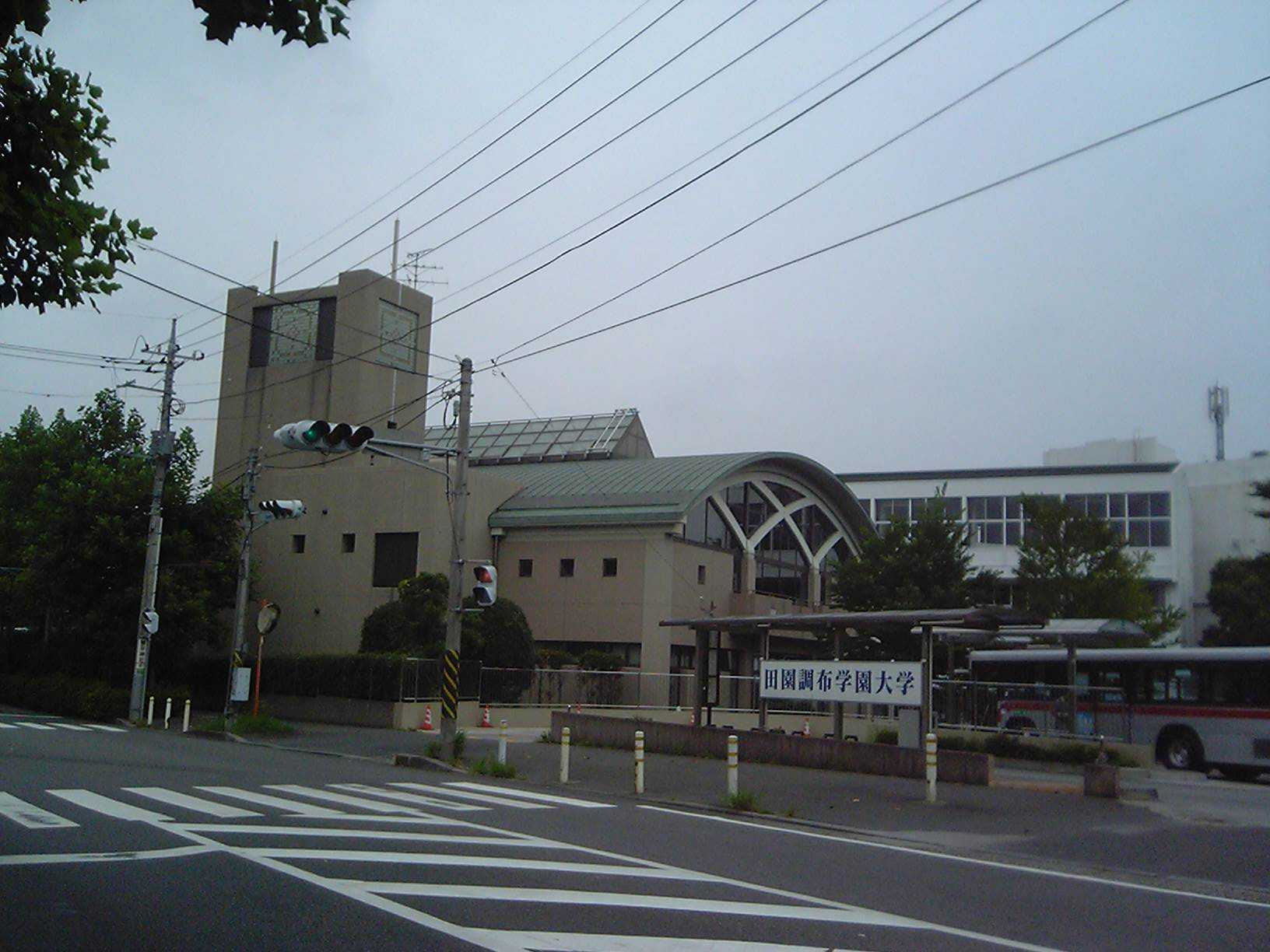
- Type: Private
- Established: 1926
- Location: Asao-ku, Kawasaki, Kanagawa, Japan
- Website: www.dcu.ac.jp

Den-en Chōfu University (田園調布学園大学, Den-en Chōfu Gakuen Daigaku) is a private university in Kawasaki, Kanagawa, Japan. Its predecessor, a women's school, was founded in 1926. It was chartered as a women's junior college in 1967 and became coeducational in 1998. In 2002 the school became a four-year college.
