= Inagi Station =

Railway station in Inagi, Tokyo, Japan

Inagi Station 稲城駅

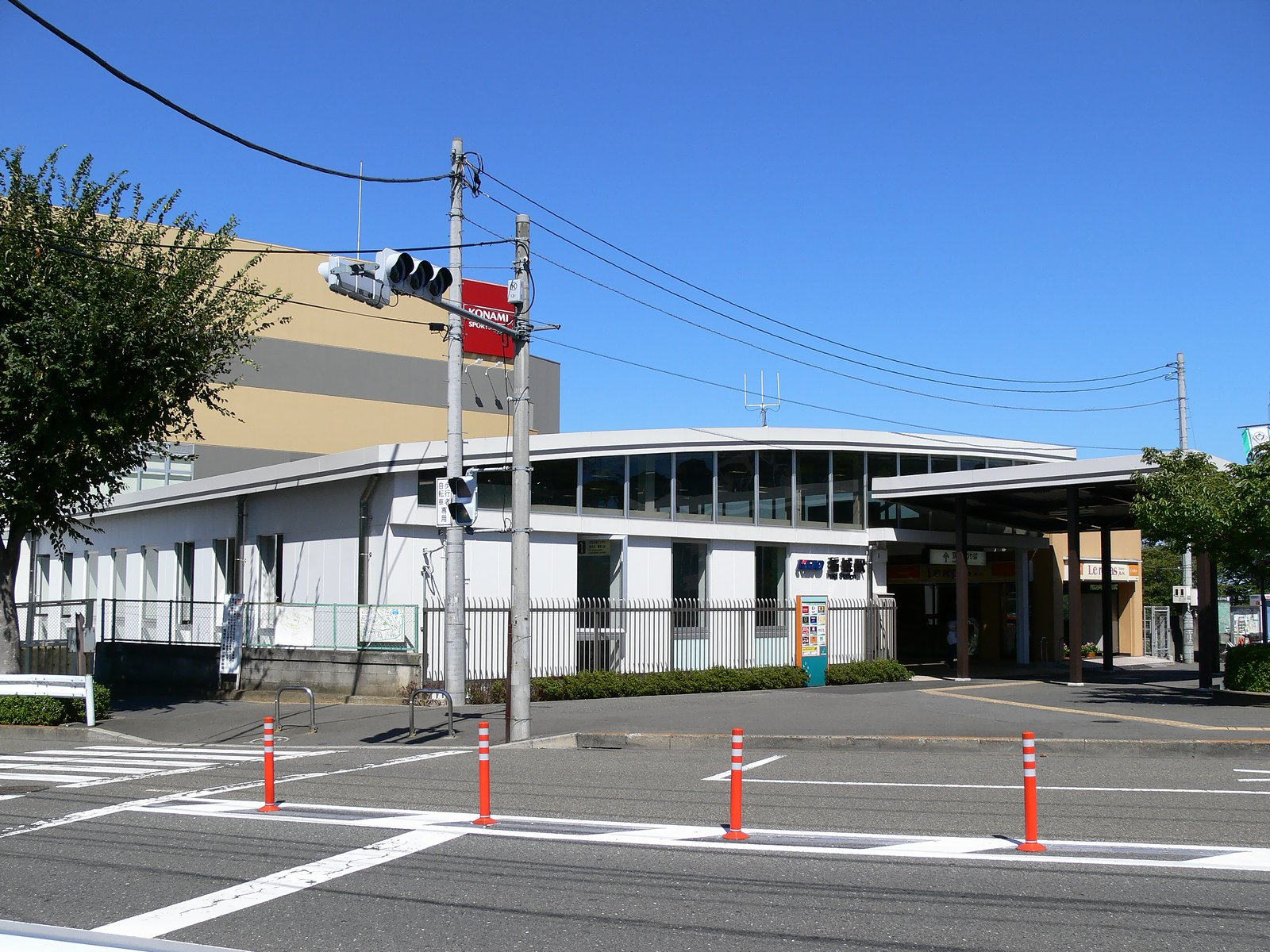
- Inagi Station

General information
- Location: 3108 Higashi-Naganuma, Inagi-shi, Tokyo 206-0802; Japan
- Coordinates: 35°38′10.41″N 139°30′1.32″E
- Operator: Keio Corporation
- Line: Keio Sagamihara Line
- Distance: 5.5 km from Chōfu
- Platforms: 2 side platforms
- Connections: Bus stop

Other information
- Station code: KO38
- Website: Official website

History
- Opened: October 18, 1974

Passengers
- FY 2019: 21,522

Services
Preceding station	Keio Corporation	Following station
Wakabadai towards Hashimoto	Sagamihara Line Semi Express Rapid Local	Keiō-yomiuri-land towards Chōfu
Location
- Location within Tokyo Location within Japan

Inagi Station (稲城駅, Inagi-eki) is a passenger railway station located in the city of Inagi, Tokyo, Japan, operated by the private railway company, Keio Corporation.

== Lines ==
Inagi Station is served by the Keiō Sagamihara Line, and is 5.5 kilometers from the terminus of the line at Chōfu and 21.0 kilometers from Shinjuku Station in downtown Tokyo.

== Station Layout ==
This station consists of two opposed elevated side platforms serving two tracks, with the station building located underneath.

=== Platforms ===
1	■ Keio Sagamihara Line	Hashimoto
2	■ Keiō Sagamihara Line	Chōfu

== History ==
The station opened on October 18, 1974.

== Passenger statistics ==
In fiscal 2019, the station was used by an average of 21,522 passengers daily.

The passenger figures for previous years are as shown below.

Fiscal year	Daily average
2005	18,679
2010	19,705
2015	20,333

== Surrounding area ==
- Tama New Town
- Inagi City Hall

== See also ==
- List of railway stations in Japan
