= Showa Academia Musicae =

Coordinates: 35°35′50″N 139°39′24″E

Shōwa Academia Musicae
- 昭和音楽大学; Shōwa ongaku daigaku
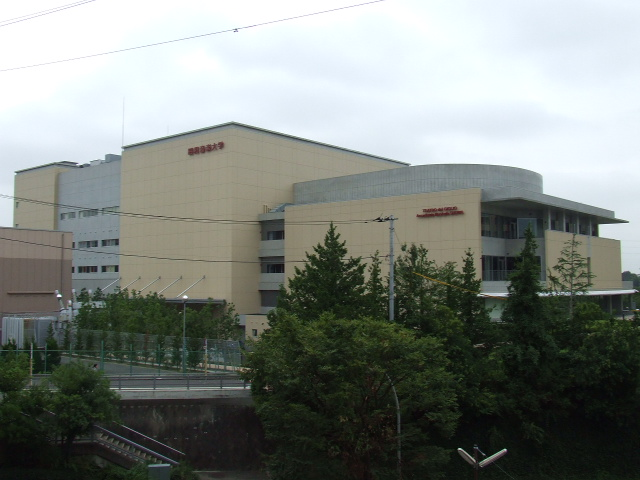
- Type: Private
- Established: 1930
- Location: Asao-ku, Kawasaki, Kanagawa, Japan
- Website: www.tosei-showa-music.ac.jp

Shōwa Academia Musicae (昭和音楽大学, Shōwa ongaku daigaku) is a private university in Asao-ku, Kawasaki Kanagawa Prefecture, Japan.

Despite similar names, the university has no affiliation with Showa University or Showa Women's University.

== History ==
The predecessor of the school was founded in Shinjuku-ku, Tokyo, in 1930. It relocated to Atsugi, Kanagawa, and was chartered as a junior college in 1969. In 1984 it became a four-year college and adopted the present name. It moved to its present location in Kawasaki in 1989.
