= Odakyū Tama Line =

Railway line in Japan

Tama Line

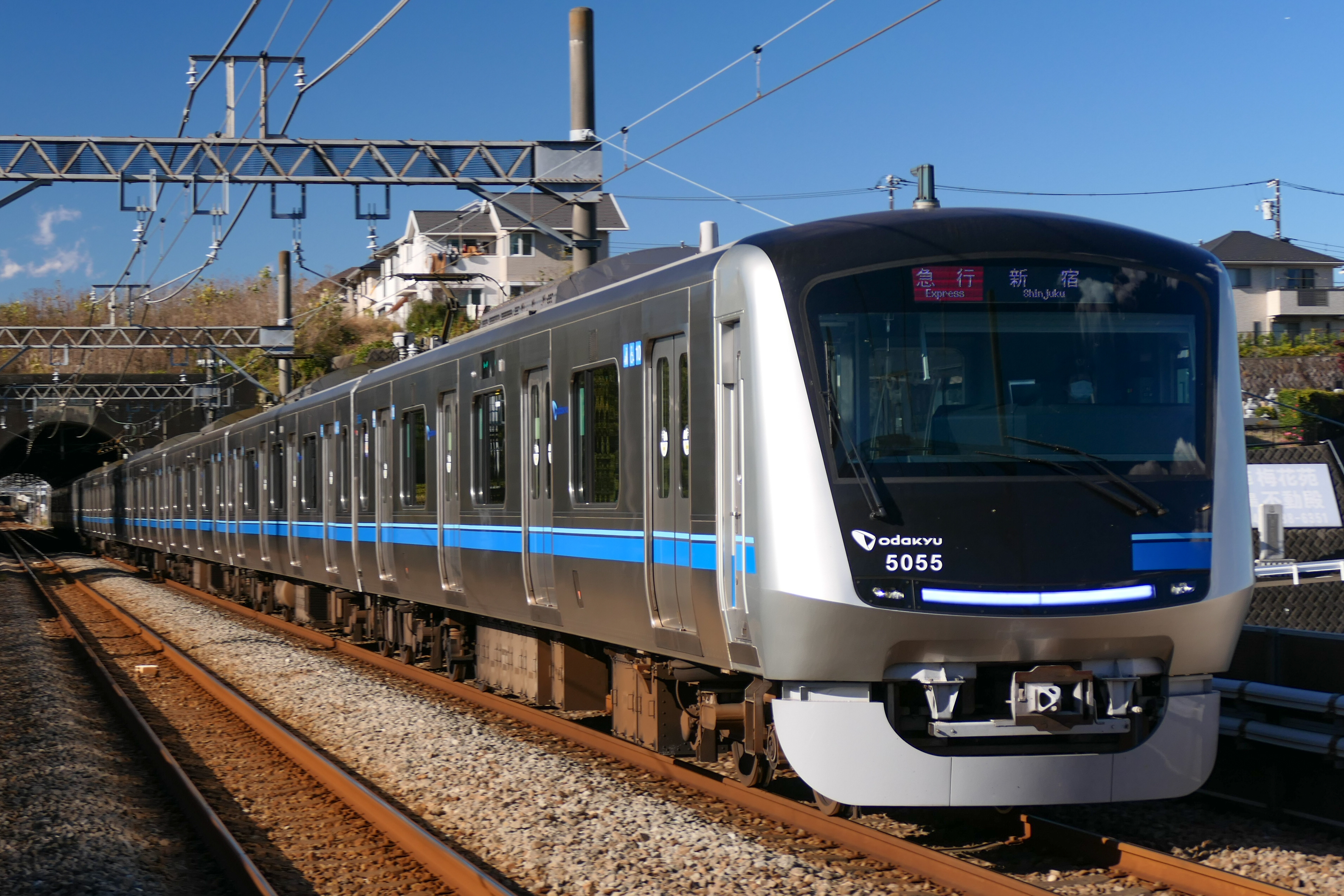
- A 5000 series EMU on the Tama Line in November 2021

Overview
- Native name: 多摩線
- Status: In service
- Owner: Odakyū Electric Railway Company, Ltd.
- Line number: OT
- Locale: Kanto region
- Termini: Shin-Yurigaoka; Karakida
- Stations: 8

Service
- Type: Commuter rail
- System: Odakyu Electric Railway

History
- Opened: 1 June 1974; 52 years ago

Technical
- Line length: 10.6 km (6.6 mi)
- Track gauge: 1,067 mm (3 ft 6 in)
- Minimum radius: 555 m (1,821 ft)
- Electrification: Overhead line, 1,500 V DC
- Operating speed: 110 km/h (68 mph)
- Signalling: Automatic closed block
- Train protection system: D-ATS-P
- Maximum incline: 2.5%

The Tama Line (Japanese: 多摩線, Hepburn: Tama-sen) is a railway line operated by the private railway operator Odakyu Electric Railway in the Greater Tokyo of Japan. The line extends 10.6 kilometres (6.6 mi) from Shin-Yurigaoka Station in Kanagawa Prefecture to Karakida Station in Tokyo.

Used for commuter service by the residents of Tama New Town, the largest New Town in Japan, rapid trains are frequent on the line, running through to Odakyu's Tokyo terminus at Shinjuku on the Odakyu Odawara Line.

== Service patterns ==
Since June 2022, the services operating on the Tama Line are as follows:

Rapid Express (快速急行, kaisoku kyūkō)
Four services from Shinjuku on weekdays, and two to Shinjuku on weekends and holidays.
Commuter Express (通勤急行, tsūkin-kyūkō)
To Shinjuku. Weekday mornings only.
Express (急行, Kyūkō)
To/from Shinjuku. Mornings and evenings.
Local (各駅停車, Kakueki Teisha)
Mostly in the line only, and some from/to Shinjuku, all day long. Most Local services to/from Shinjuku operate as Express services on the Odawara Line.

== Former Service ==
Tama Express (多摩急行, Tama Kyūkō)
All from/to Toride on East Japan Railway Company (JR East) Joban Line via the Chiyoda Line. All day.

== Stations ==
Local services stop at all stations.

No.	Station	Distance in km (mi)			Rapid Express	Express	Commuter Express	Transfers	Location
No.	Station	Between stations	From Shin-Yurigaoka	From Shinjuku	Rapid Express	Express	Commuter Express	Transfers	Location
↑ Through-running to/from Shinjuku via the Odawara Line ↑
OH23	Shin-Yurigaoka 新百合ヶ丘	—N/a	0 (0)	21.5 (13.4)	●	●	●	Odawara Line (through service)	Asao, Kawasaki, Kanagawa
OT01	Satsukidai 五月台	1.5 (0.93)	1.5 (0.93)	23.0 (14.3)	|	●	↑		Asao, Kawasaki, Kanagawa
OT02	Kurihira 栗平	1.3 (0.81)	2.8 (1.7)	24.3 (15.1)	●	●	●		Asao, Kawasaki, Kanagawa
OT03	Kurokawa 黒川	1.3 (0.81)	4.1 (2.5)	25.6 (15.9)	|	●	↑		Asao, Kawasaki, Kanagawa
OT04	Haruhino はるひ野	0.8 (0.50)	4.9 (3.0)	26.4 (16.4)	|	●	↑		Asao, Kawasaki, Kanagawa
OT05	Odakyū-Nagayama 小田急永山	1.9 (1.2)	6.8 (4.2)	28.3 (17.6)	●	●	●	Keio Sagamihara Line (KO40: Keiō Nagayama)	Tama, Tokyo
OT06	Odakyū-Tama-Center 小田急多摩センター	2.3 (1.4)	9.1 (5.7)	30.6 (19.0)	●	●	●	Keio Sagamihara Line (KO41: Keiō Tama-Center); Tama Toshi Monorail Line (TT01: Tama-Center)	Tama, Tokyo
OT07	Karakida 唐木田	1.5 (0.93)	10.6 (6.6)	32.1 (19.9)	●	●	●		Tama, Tokyo

== History ==
This line was built as a part of Tokyo Line 9, linked with the Tokyo Metro Chiyoda Line and Odakyu Odawara Line.

Odakyu started service on the first section, from Shin-Yurigaoka to Odakyū-Nagayama, on June 1, 1974. It expanded to Tama Center, the central station of Tama New Town, on April 23, 1975. This section was constructed by the national Japan Railway Construction Corporation, since renamed the Japan Railway Construction, Transport and Technology Agency (JRTT), while Odakyu operated it and paid for the organization. On March 27, 1990, Odakyu opened Karakida station.

The line was constructed as double track, but Odakyu could not take a large part of the transport between Tokyo and Tama New Town. Delay to the quadrupling of the main Odawara Line due to long standing land acquisition conflicts prevented operating extra trains that were to connect the new town and the terminus of Shinjuku.

Rapid train services on the Tama Line began in 2000, and succeeded in increasing the number of passengers, shorting transit time.
