= Tama, Tokyo =

Tama 多摩市
- City
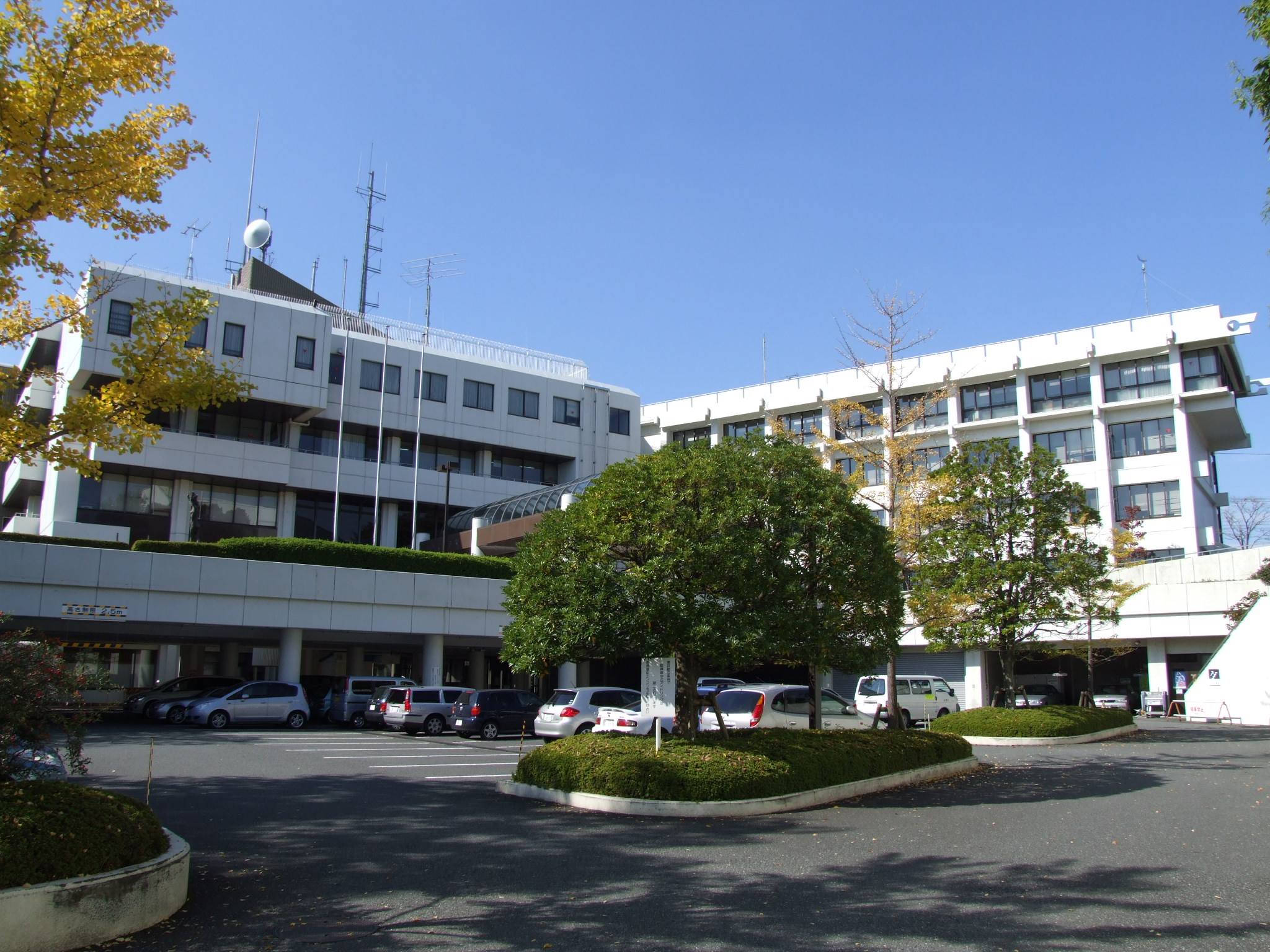
- Tama City Hall

- Flag Seal

- Location of Tama in Tokyo

- Coordinates: 35°38′13″N 139°26′46.6″E
- Country: Japan
- Region: Kantō
- Prefecture: Tokyo
- Town Settled: April 1. 1964
- City Settled: November 1, 1971

Government
  - Mayor: Hiroyuki Abe (from April 2010)

Area
  - Total: 21.01 km^{2} (8.11 sq mi)

Population (March 2021)
  - Total: 148,285
  - Density: 7,058/km^{2} (18,280/sq mi)
- Time zone: UTC+9 (Japan Standard Time)
- Symbols
  - Tree: Ginkgo biloba
  - Flower: Prunus serrulata
  - Bird: Oriental turtle dove
- Phone number: 042-375-8111
- Address: 6-12-1 Sekido, Tama-shi, Tokyo 206-8666
- Website: Official website

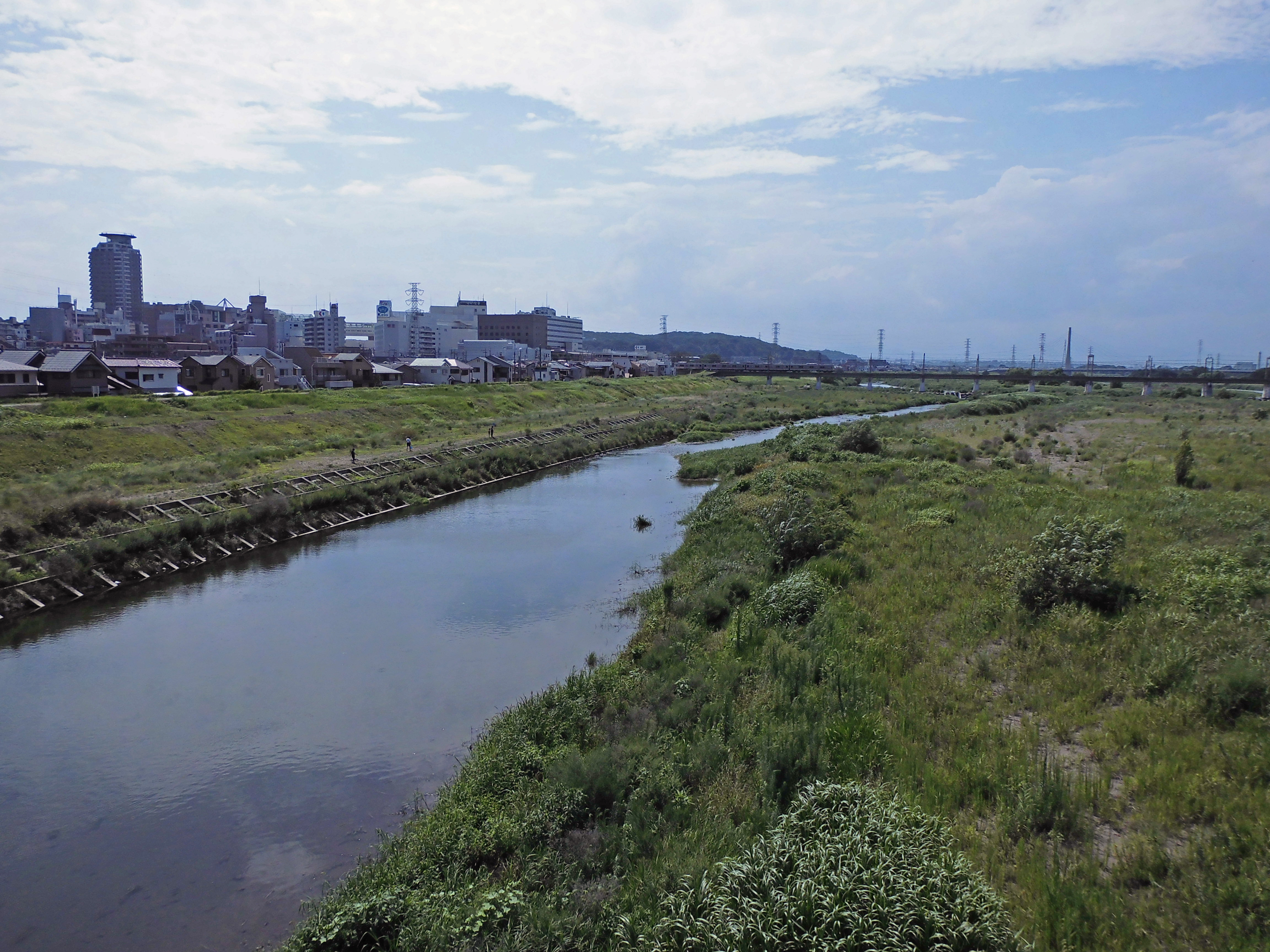
View of Tama River and Seiseki Sakuragaoka

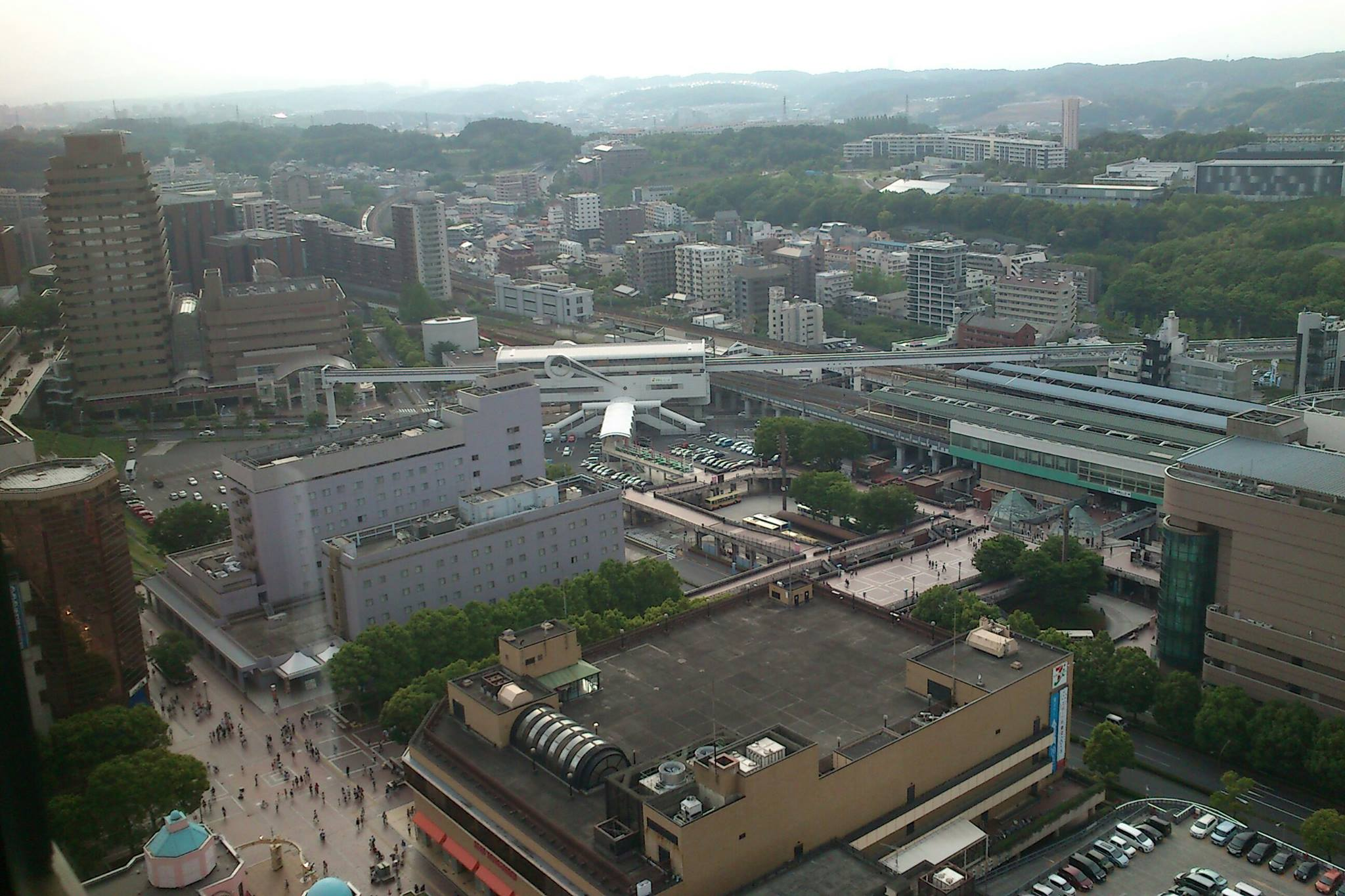
Tama-Center Station and its surroundings, May 2013

Tama (多摩市, Tama-shi) is a city located in the western portion of the Tokyo Metropolis, Japan. As of 11 March 2021, the city had an estimated population of 148,285 in 73,167 households, and a population density of 7,100 inhabitants per square kilometre (18,000/sq mi). The total area of the city was 21.01 square kilometres (8.11 sq mi).

== Geography ==
Tama is located in the foothills of the Okutama Mountains of southwestern Tokyo, known as Tama Hills, which spans Tokyo and Kanagawa Prefecture. The entire region is historically referred to as Tama; therefore there are many place names scattered throughout the area with references to the name "Tama" which are not within the city limits. The Tama River marks the city's northern boundary, and Kanagawa Prefecture is to the south. Its southern half forms part of the Tama New Town project, Japan's largest residential development, constructed in the 1970s.

=== Surrounding municipalities ===
Kanagawa Prefecture

- Kawasaki

Tokyo Metropolis

- Fuchū
- Hachiōji
- Hino
- Inagi
- Machida

=== Climate ===
Tama has a humid subtropical climate (Köppen Cfa) characterized by warm summers and cool winters with light to no snowfall. The average annual temperature in Tama is 14.0 °C. The average annual rainfall is 1647 mm with September as the wettest month. The temperatures are highest on average in August, at around 25.3 °C, and lowest in January, at around 2.8 °C.

== Demographics ==
Per Japanese census data, the population of Tama increased very rapidly in the late 20th century but has plateaued in the early 21st.

Historical population
| Year | Pop. | ±% |
|---|---|---|
| 1920 | 4,111 | — |
| 1930 | 4,497 | +9.4% |
| 1940 | 5,158 | +14.7% |
| 1950 | 7,394 | +43.4% |
| 1960 | 9,746 | +31.8% |
| 1970 | 30,672 | +214.7% |
| 1980 | 95,248 | +210.5% |
| 1990 | 144,489 | +51.7% |
| 2000 | 145,862 | +1.0% |
| 2010 | 147,648 | +1.2% |
| 2020 | 146,951 | −0.5% |

== History ==
- The area of present-day Tama was part of ancient Musashi Province. In the post-Meiji Restoration cadastral reform of July 22, 1878, the area became part of Minamitama District in Kanagawa Prefecture.
- Tama Village was founded on April 1, 1889, from the merger of 11 pre-Meiji period hamlets with the establishment of the modern municipalities system.
- Minamitama District was transferred to the administrative control of Tokyo Metropolis on April 1, 1893.
- Tama was elevated to town status on April 1, 1964. Construction of Tama New Town began in 1966, and the first occupants started moving in 1971.
- On November 1, 1971, Tama Town was reclassified as Tama City, dissolving Minamitama District. Tama was the last town in the former Minamitama District.

== Government ==
Tama has a mayor-council form of government with a directly elected mayor and a unicameral city council of 26 members. Tama, together with the city of Inagi, contributes two members to the Tokyo Metropolitan Assembly. In terms of national politics, the city is divided between Tokyo 21st district and Tokyo 23rd district of the lower house of the Diet of Japan.

== Election ==
In 2018, an activist named Michihito Matsuda ran for mayor in the Tama city area of Tokyo as a human proxy for an artificial intelligence program. While election posters and campaign material used the term robot, and displayed stock images of a feminine android, the "AI mayor" was in fact a machine learning algorithm trained using Tama city datasets. The project was backed by high-profile executives Tetsuzo Matsumoto of Softbank and Norio Murakami of Google. Michihito Matsuda came third in the election, being defeated by Hiroyuki Abe. Organisers claimed that the 'AI mayor' was programmed to analyze citizen petitions put forward to the city council in a more 'fair and balanced' way than human politicians. In 2022, Michihito Matsuda made the campaign pledge to install THXU token into Tama city's further development as one of Government by algorithm.

== Economy ==
Several companies have their headquarters in the city:

- Keio Corporation
- Mitsumi Electric
- JUKI

== Education ==
=== Universities and colleges ===
- Keisen University Tama Campus
- Kokushikan University Tama Campus
- Otsuma Women's University Tama Campus
- Tama University Tama Campus
- Teikyo University Hachioji Campus
- University of Tokyo Health Sciences
- National Farmer's Academy

=== Elementary and secondary schools ===
The Tokyo Metropolitan Government Board of Education operates Nagayama High School, the one public high school.

The Tama city government operates 17 public elementary and nine public junior high schools.

Municipal junior high schools:

- Higashi Atago (東愛宕中学校)
- Hijirigaoka (聖ヶ丘中学校)
- Ochiai (落合中学校)
- Seiryo (青陵中学校)
- Suwa (諏訪中学校)
- Tama (多摩中学校)
- Tama Nagayama (多摩永山中学校)
- Tsurumaki (鶴牧中学校)
- Wada (和田中学校)

Municipal elementary schools:

- Aiwa (愛和小学校)
- Higashi Ochiai (東落合小学校)
- Higashiteragata (東寺方小学校)
- Hijirigaoka (聖ヶ丘小学校)
- Kaidori (貝取小学校)
- Kitasuwa (北諏訪小学校)
- Minami Tsurumaki (南鶴牧小学校)
- Nagayama (永山小学校)
- Nishiochiai (西落合小学校)
- Omatsudai (大松台小学校)
- Renkoji (連光寺小学校)
- Suwa (諏訪小学校)
- Tama No. 1 (多摩第一小学校)
- Tama No. 2 (多摩第二小学校)
- Tama No. 3 (多摩第三小学校)
- Toyogaoka (豊ヶ丘小学校)
- Uryu (瓜生小学校)

There is also one private elementary school and one private junior high school, and two private combined junior/senior high schools.

- Otsuma Tama Junior and Senior High School - Girls' school
- Tama University Hijirigaoka Junior & Senior High School

== Transportation ==
=== Railway ===
Keio Corporation - Keiō Line

- Seiseki-Sakuragaoka

Keio Corporation - Keiō Sagamihara Line

- Keiō-Nagayama - Keiō-Tama-Center

Odakyu Electric Railway - Odakyū Tama Line

- Odakyū-Nagayama - Odakyū-Tama-Center - Karakida

Tama Monorail

- Tama Center

=== Highway ===
Tama is not served by any national expressways or national highways

== Military facilities ==
- Tama Hills, a recreational facility of the U.S. Air Force, intended for use by United States service members and their families, as well as Japan Maritime Self-Defense Force service members and their families.

== Local attractions ==
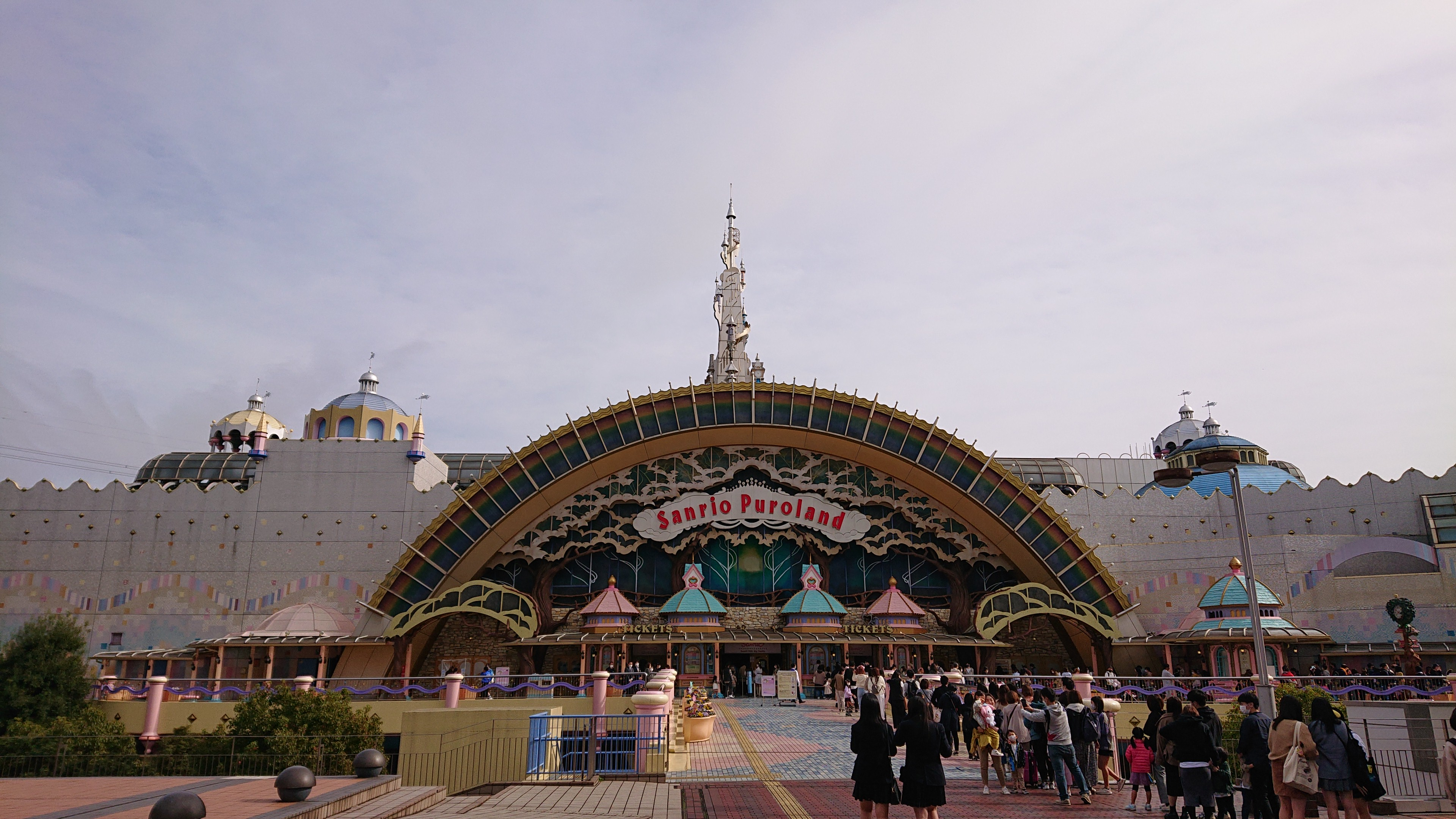
Tama Puroland

- Sanrio Puroland Amusement Park
- Thirteen Buddhas of Tama

== Sister cities ==
- Fujimi, Nagano, Japan
