= Shin-Yurigaoka Station =

Railway station in Kawasaki, Kanagawa Prefecture, Japan

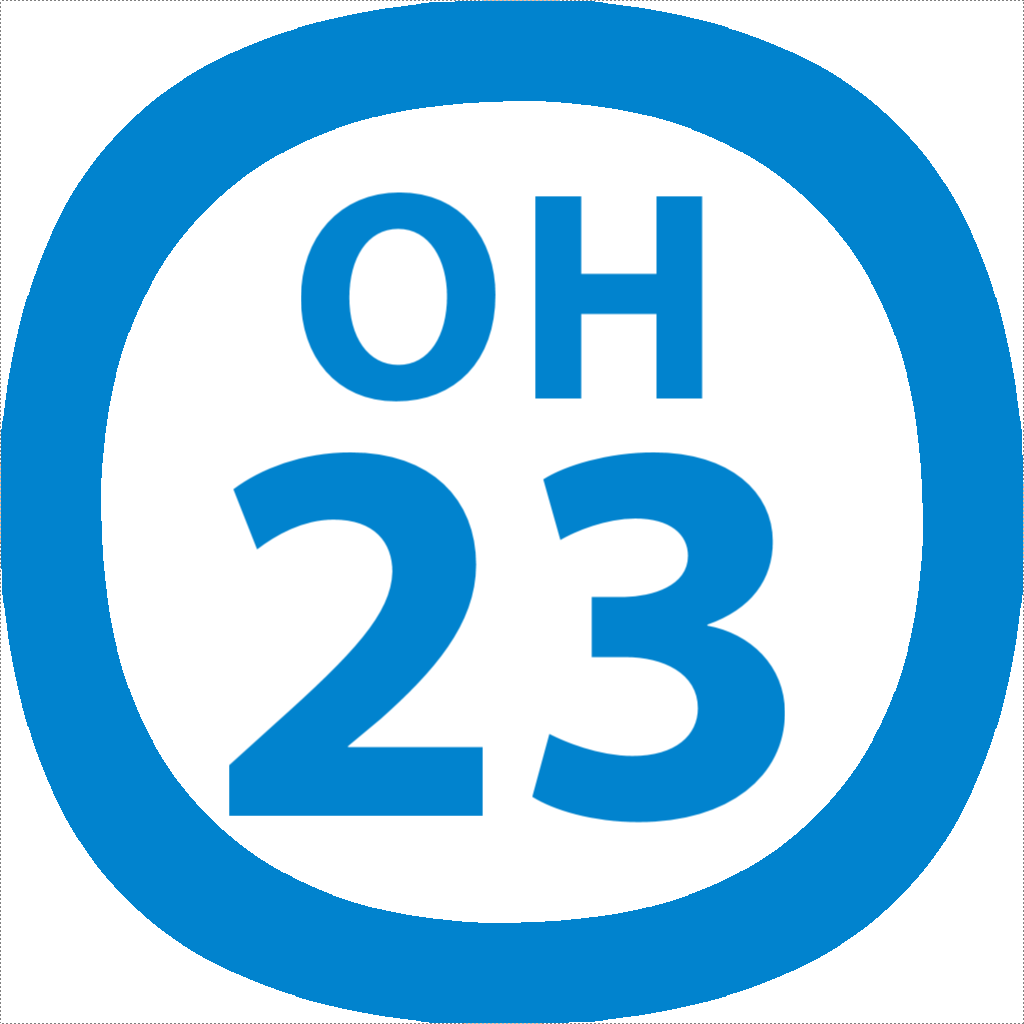
Shin-Yurigaoka Station 新百合ヶ丘駅

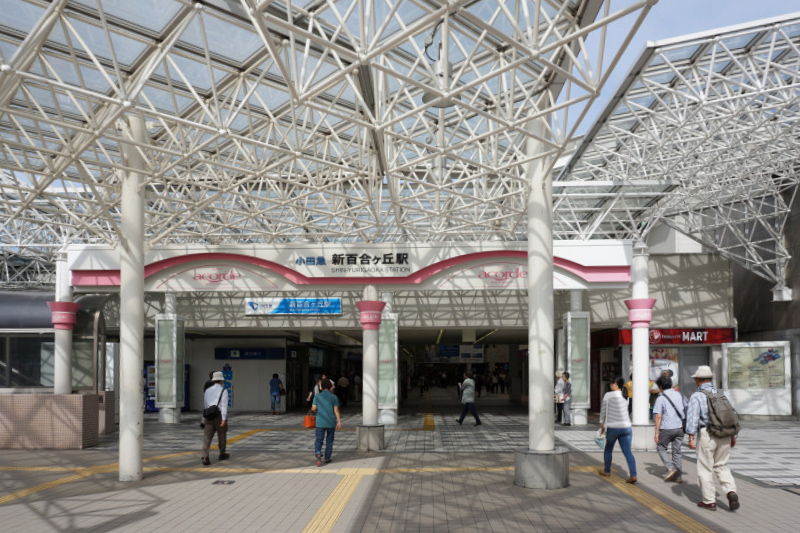
- The south entrance to Shin-Yurigaoka Station in October 2016

General information
- Location: 1-18-1 Manpukuji, Asao-ku, Kawasaki-shi, Kanagawa-ken 215-0004; Japan
- Coordinates: 35.603754°N 139.507656°E
- Operator: Odakyu Electric Railway
- Lines: Odakyū Odawara Line; Odakyū Tama Line
- Distance: 21.5 km from Shinjuku
- Platforms: 3 island platforms
- Tracks: 6
- Connections: Bus stop

Other information
- Station code: OH23
- Website: Official website

History
- Opened: June 1, 1974; 52 years ago

Passengers
- FY2019: 21,681

Services
Preceding station	Odakyu	Following station
Machida towards Hakone-Yumoto, Gotemba or Katase-Enoshima	Romancecar	Seijōgakuen-mae towards Shinjuku or Kita-Senju
Machida towards Odawara	Odawara Line Rapid Express	Noborito towards Shinjuku or Yoyogi-Uehara
Machida towards Odawara	Odawara Line Express	Mukogaoka-Yuen towards Shinjuku or Yoyogi-Uehara
through to Tama Line, One-way operation	Odawara Line Commuter Express	Mukogaoka-Yuen towards Shinjuku
Kakio One-way operation	Odawara Line Commuter Semi Express	Yurigaoka towards Yoyogi-Uehara
Kakio towards Hon-Atsugi	Odawara Line Semi Express	Yurigaoka towards Yoyogi-Uehara
Kakio towards Odawara	Odawara Line Local	Yurigaoka towards Shinjuku or Yoyogi-Uehara
Kurihira towards Karakida	Tama Line Rapid Express Rapid Express	through to Odawara Line
Kurihira towards Karakida	Tama Line Commuter Express	through to Odawara Line
Satsukidai towards Karakida	Tama Line Express Local	through to Odawara Line
Location
- Location within Kanagawa Prefecture Location within Japan

Shin-Yurigaoka Station (新百合ヶ丘駅, Shin-Yurigaoka-eki) is a junction passenger railway station located in the Manpukuji neighborhood of Asao-ku, Kawasaki, Kanagawa, Japan and operated by the private railway operator Odakyu Electric Railway.

== Lines ==
Shin-Yurigaoka Station is served by the Odakyu Odawara Line, with some through services to and from Shinjuku in Tokyo. It lies 21.5 kilometres (13.4 miles) from the Shinjuku terminus. It is also the eastern terminus of the Odakyū Tama Line.

== Station layout ==
The station consists of three island platforms serving six tracks, with an elevated station building.

=== Platforms ===
1-2	■ Odakyū Odawara Line	for Sagami-Ōno, Hon-Atsugi, and Odawara
3-4	■ Odakyū Tama Line	for Odakyu-Tama-Center and Karakida
5-6	■ Odakyū Odawara Line	for Kyōdō, Shimo-Kitazawa, and Yoyogi-Uehara; Tokyo Metro Chiyoda Line for Ayase and Shinjuku

== Lines ==
Shin-Yurigaoka Station is served by the Odakyū Odawara Line and is also the starting point of the Odakyū Tama Line. It is 21.5 km from the terminus of the Odawara Line at Shinjuku Station.

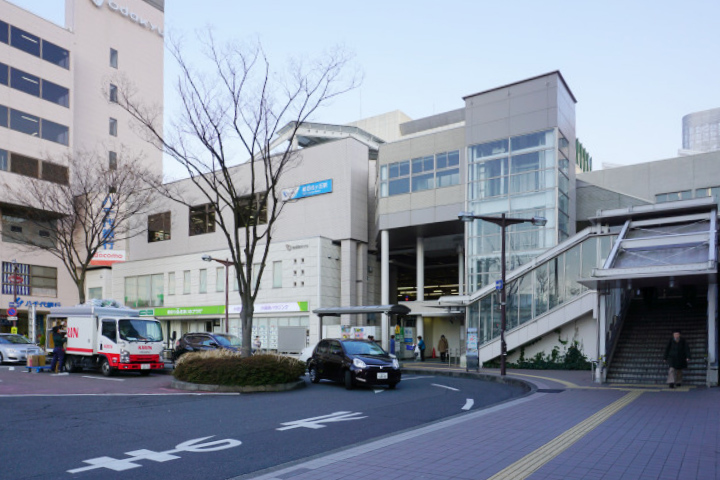
The north entrance to the station in March 2017

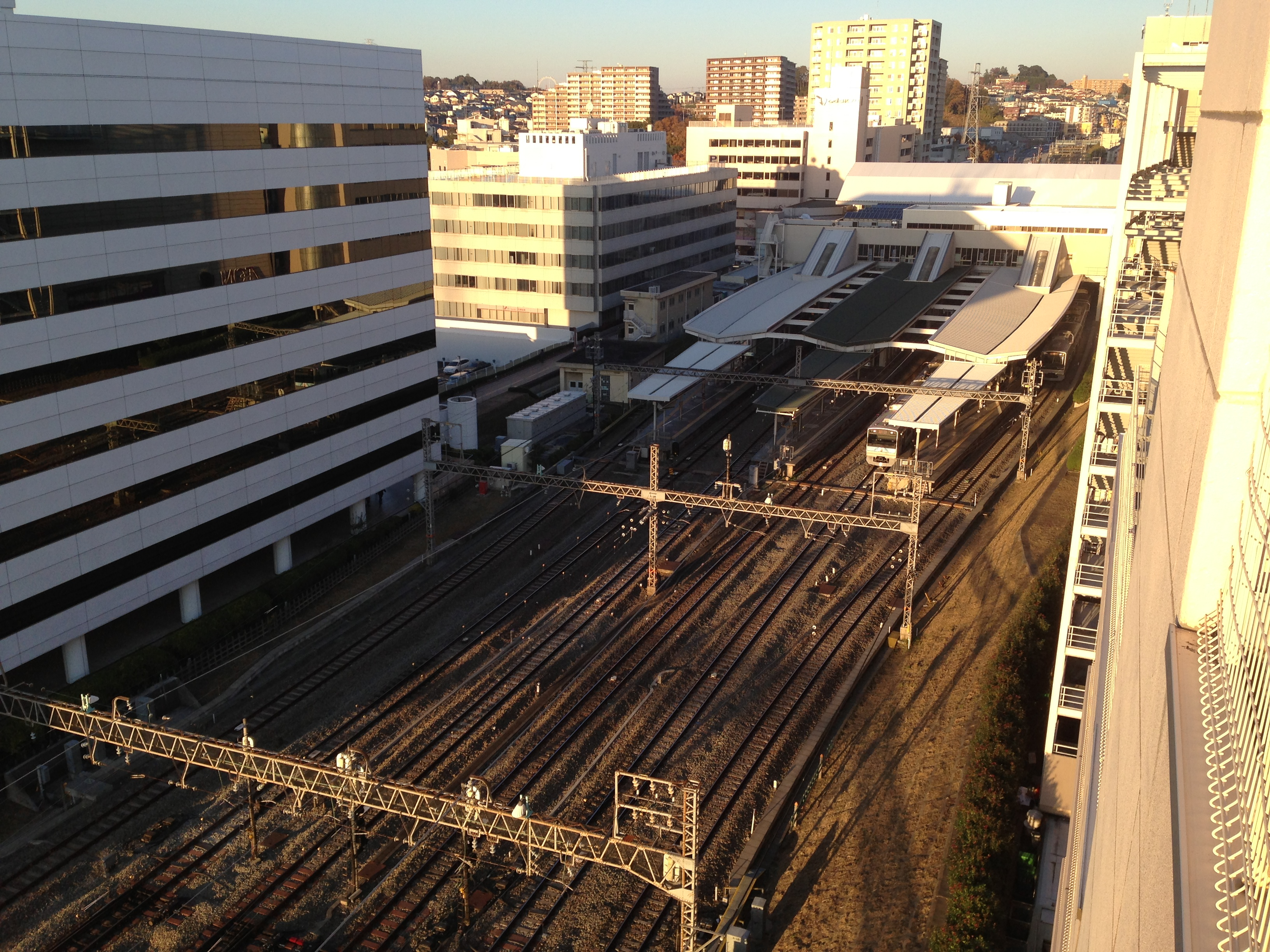
An overview of the station platforms in December 2012

== History ==
Shin Yurigaoka Station opened on 1 June 1974. The greenfield station was developed by Odakyu Railway in 1974 as a purpose built station to hold trains for expresses to overtake local trains, and as a temporary holding spot for large numbers of passengers as the closer stations and rails towards central Tokyo were a chokepoint and had land acquisition issues and protracted legal filings with residents for decades, particularly in Setagaya ward. There was no room for six parallel platforms closer to Tokyo. Due to these lawsuits, the congested Odakyū Odawara Line was even unable to acquire land by year 2000 for quad tracking on the Odawara line north of the station (in/out of Tokyo), resorting to phased expensive fixes to lack of land such as stacking rails vertically using tunnels and grade separation, finished in March 2018. Along with the station, an attached masterplanned community was coordinated by Odakyu to support the railway. The station has been planned to connect to the Yokohama Municipal Subway and proposed Kawasaki Municipal Subway lines, but the Kawasaki plan has been cancelled.

Station numbering was introduced in January 2014 with Shin-Yurigaoka being assigned station number OH23.

On 21 January 2020, Yokohama City and Kawasaki City announced the route and four new stations for the planned 6.5 km extension of the Yokohama Municipal Subway Blue Line from Azamino Station to Shin-Yurigaoka Station. Construction of this section is expected to complete by 2030. In June 2020, the Yokohama City Transportation Bureau started environmental impact assessment procedures of the extension project.

== Passenger statistics ==
The passenger figures for recent years are as shown below:

Fiscal year	daily average
2005	21,572
2010	21,177
2015	21,522
2019	21,681

== Surrounding area ==
- Asao Ward Office
- Japan Institute of the Moving Image
- Showa Academia Musicae

== See also ==
- List of railway stations in Japan
