= Karakida Station =

Railway station in Tama, Tokyo, Japan

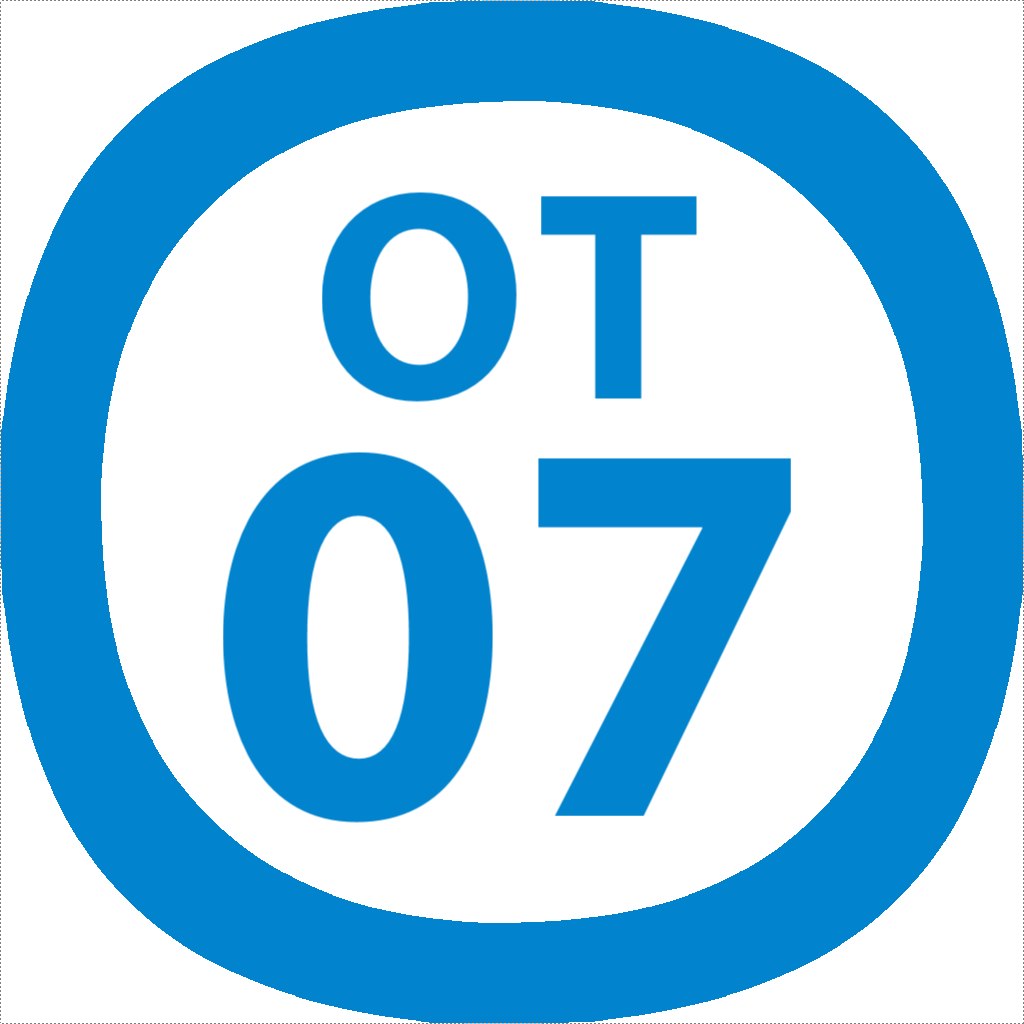
Karakida Station 唐木田駅

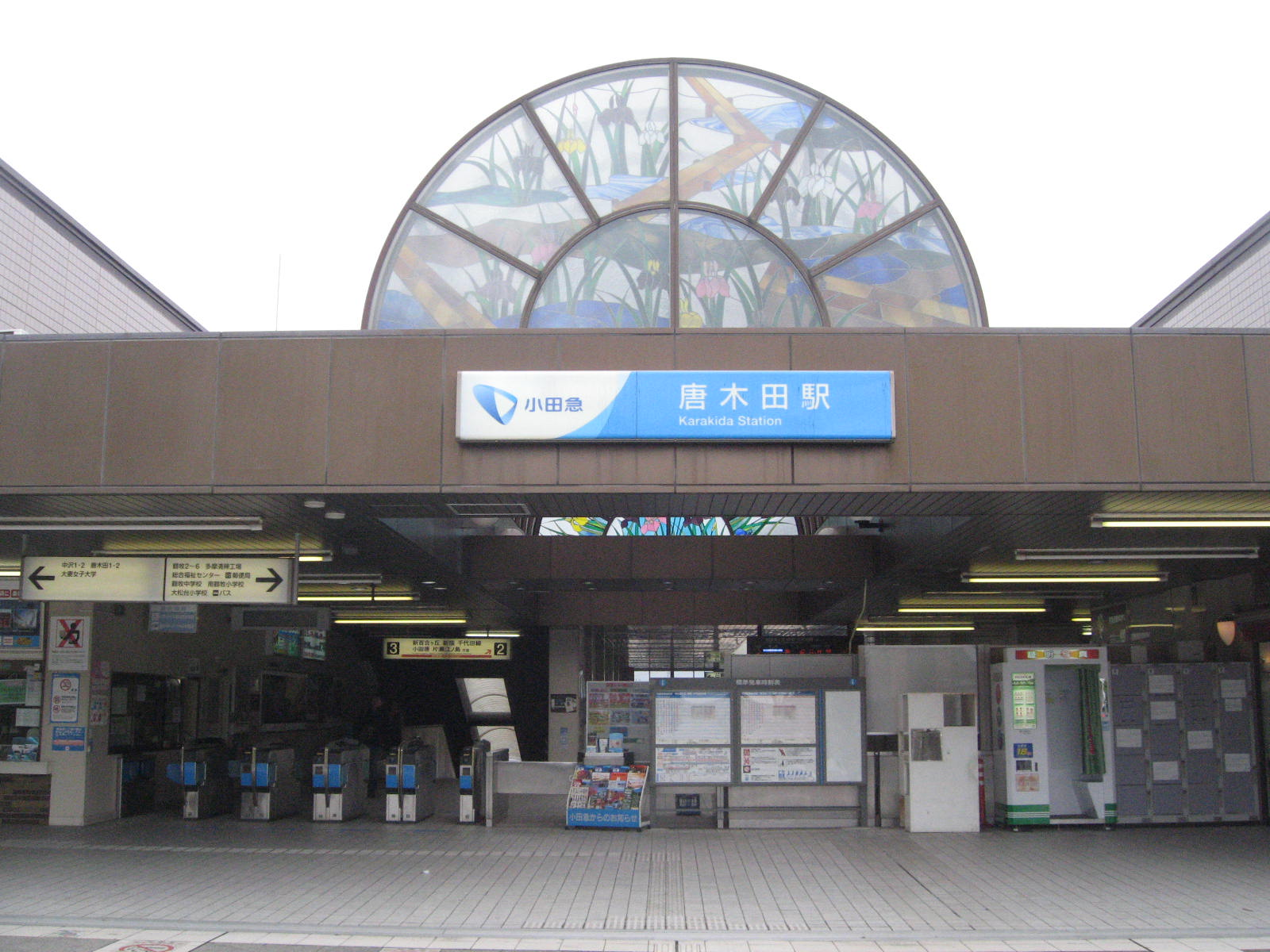
- Karakida Station in October 2010

General information
- Location: 1-2-1 Karakida, Tama-shi, Tokyo; Japan
- Coordinates: 35.6158344°N 139.4111234°E
- Operator: Odakyu Electric Railway
- Line: Odakyu Tama Line
- Distance: 10.6 km from Shin-Yurigaoka
- Platforms: 1 side + 1 island platform
- Connections: Bus stop

Other information
- Station code: OT07
- Website: Official website

History
- Opened: March 27, 1990; 36 years ago

Passengers
- FY2019: 17,207 daily

Services
Preceding station	Odakyu	Following station
Terminus	Tama Line Rapid Express Commuter Express Express Local	Odakyū-Tama-Center towards Shin-Yurigaoka
Location
- Location within Tokyo Location within Japan

Karakida Station (唐木田駅, Karakida-eki) is a passenger railway station located in the city of Tama, Tokyo, Japan, operated by the private railway operator Odakyu Electric Railway.

== Lines ==
Karakida Station is the terminus of the Odakyu Tama Line, and is located 10.6 kilometers from the starting point of the line at Shin-Yurigaoka Station and 32.1 kilometers from Shinjuku Station.

== Station layout ==
Karakida Station has one side platform and one island platform serving three tracks.

=== Platforms ===
1-3	Odakyu Tama Line	for Odakyu Tama Center, Shin-Yurigaoka, and Shinjuku; Tokyo Metro Chiyoda Line for Ayase; Joban Line for Abiko and Toride

== History ==
The station opened on March 27, 1990.

== Passenger statistics ==
In fiscal 2019, the station was used by an average of 17,207 passengers daily, making it the 55th busiest station in the Odakyu system.

== Surrounding area ==
- Otsuma Women's University Tama Campus
- Otsuma Tama Junior and Senior High School

== See also ==
- List of railway stations in Japan
