= Tokyo Metro 16000 series =

Japanese electric multiple unit train type

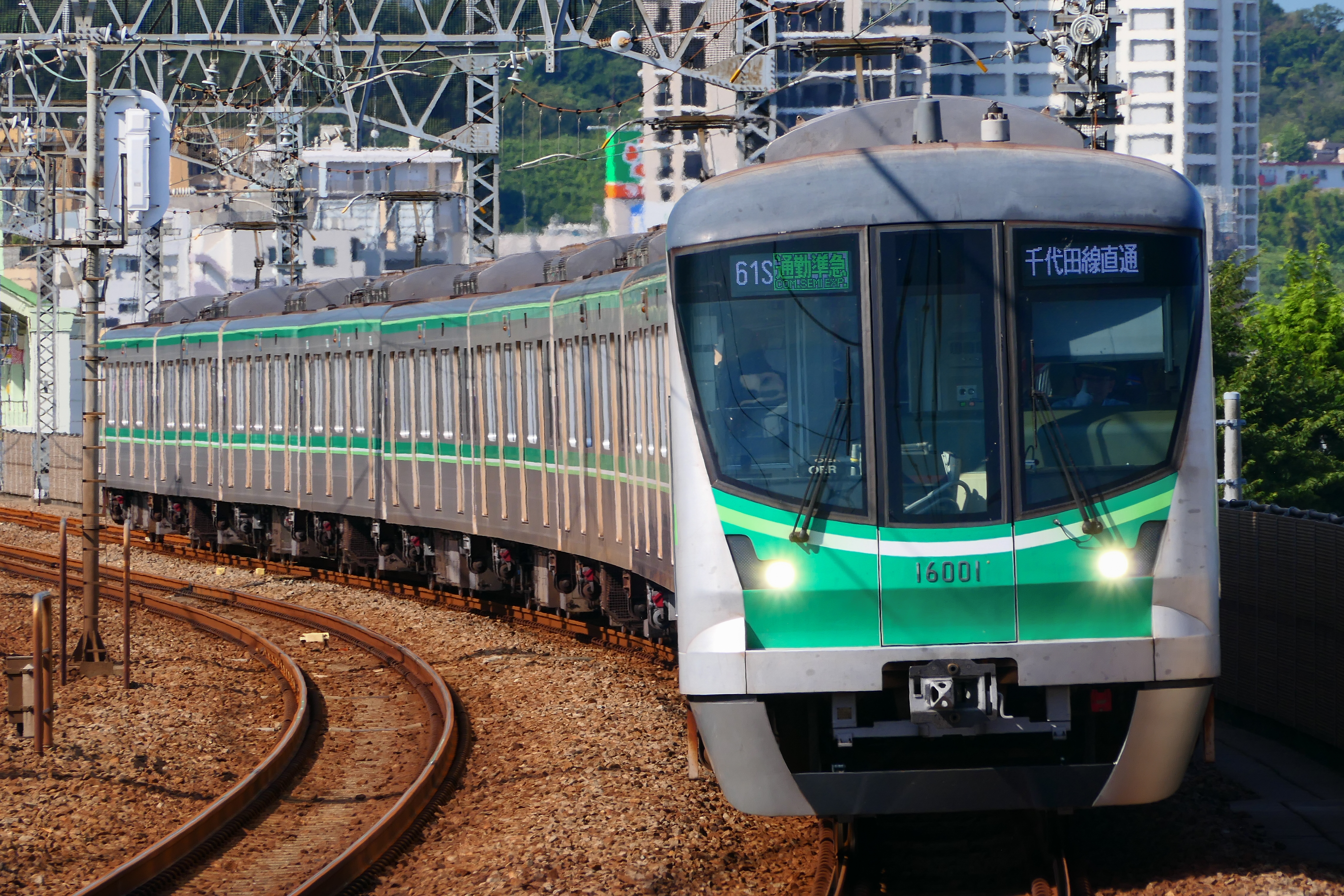
- Set 16101 in July 2023
- In service: November 2010–Present
- Manufacturers: Hitachi, Kawasaki Heavy Industries
- Family name: Kawasaki efACE; Hitachi A-train
- Replaced: Tokyo Metro 6000 series Tokyo Metro 06 series
- Constructed: 2010–2012, 2015–2017
- Entered service: 4 November 2010
- Number built: 370 vehicles (37 sets)
- Number in service: 370 vehicles (37 sets)
- Formation: 10 cars per trainset
- Fleet numbers: 16101–16137
- Capacity: 143 (48 seating) (end car), 154 (51/54 seating) (intermediate car)
- Operator: Tokyo Metro
- Depot: Ayase
- Lines served: Chiyoda Line; Jōban Line (Local); Odawara Line; Tama Line

Specifications
- Car body construction: Aluminium alloy
- Car length: 20 m (65 ft 7 in)
- Width: 2.8 m (9 ft 2 in)
- Height: 4.08 m (13 ft 5 in) (with pantograph); 4.075 m (13 ft 4 in) (without pantograph)
- Doors: 4 pairs per side
- Maximum speed: 110 km/h (68 mph) (design)
- Weight: 26.5–36.5 t (26.1–35.9 long tons; 29.2–40.2 short tons) per car
- Traction system: Toshiba (1st–3rd batch) and Mitsubishi (4th batch) 2-level VVVF (Si-IGBT switching device)
- Traction motors: Toshiba PMSM
- Power output: 3,280 kW (4,399 hp) (205 kW x 4 per motored car)
- Acceleration: 3.3 km/(h⋅s) (2.1 mph/s)
- Deceleration: 3.7 km/(h⋅s) (2.3 mph/s) (service); 4.7 km/(h⋅s) (2.9 mph/s) (emergency)
- Electric systems: 1,500 V DC Overhead line
- Current collection: PT7136-G single-arm pantograph
- Bogies: FS779
- Braking systems: Electronically controlled pneumatic brakes with regenerative braking, pure electric braking
- Safety systems: New CS-ATC, Odakyu D-ATS-P
- Coupling system: Shibata coupler
- Track gauge: 1,067 mm (3 ft 6 in)

The Tokyo Metro 16000 series (東京メトロ16000系, Tōkyō Metoro 16000-kei) is an electric multiple unit (EMU) train type operated by the Tokyo subway operator Tokyo Metro on the Tokyo Metro Chiyoda Line in Tokyo, Japan, since November 2010.

== Operations ==
The 16000 series sets are used on the following lines.

- Tokyo Metro Chiyoda Line
- Odakyu Odawara Line (Shin-Yurigaoka – Yoyogi-Uehara)
- Odakyu Tama Line (Karakida – Shin-Yurigaoka)
- Joban Line (Ayase – Toride)

== Design ==
The 16000 series uses Toshiba-branded synchronous motors with permanent magnets, offering 10% energy savings compared to the motors used in earlier 10000 series trains.

The first 12 sets were manufactured by Kawasaki Heavy Industries in Hyogo Prefecture, but sets 16113 to 16128 were built by Hitachi in Yamaguchi Prefecture.

Sets from 16106 onward feature a modified front end design with the emergency door offset to the left-hand side away from the driver's position.

Sets 16117 onward feature wheelchair spaces in all cars, and use LED lighting throughout.

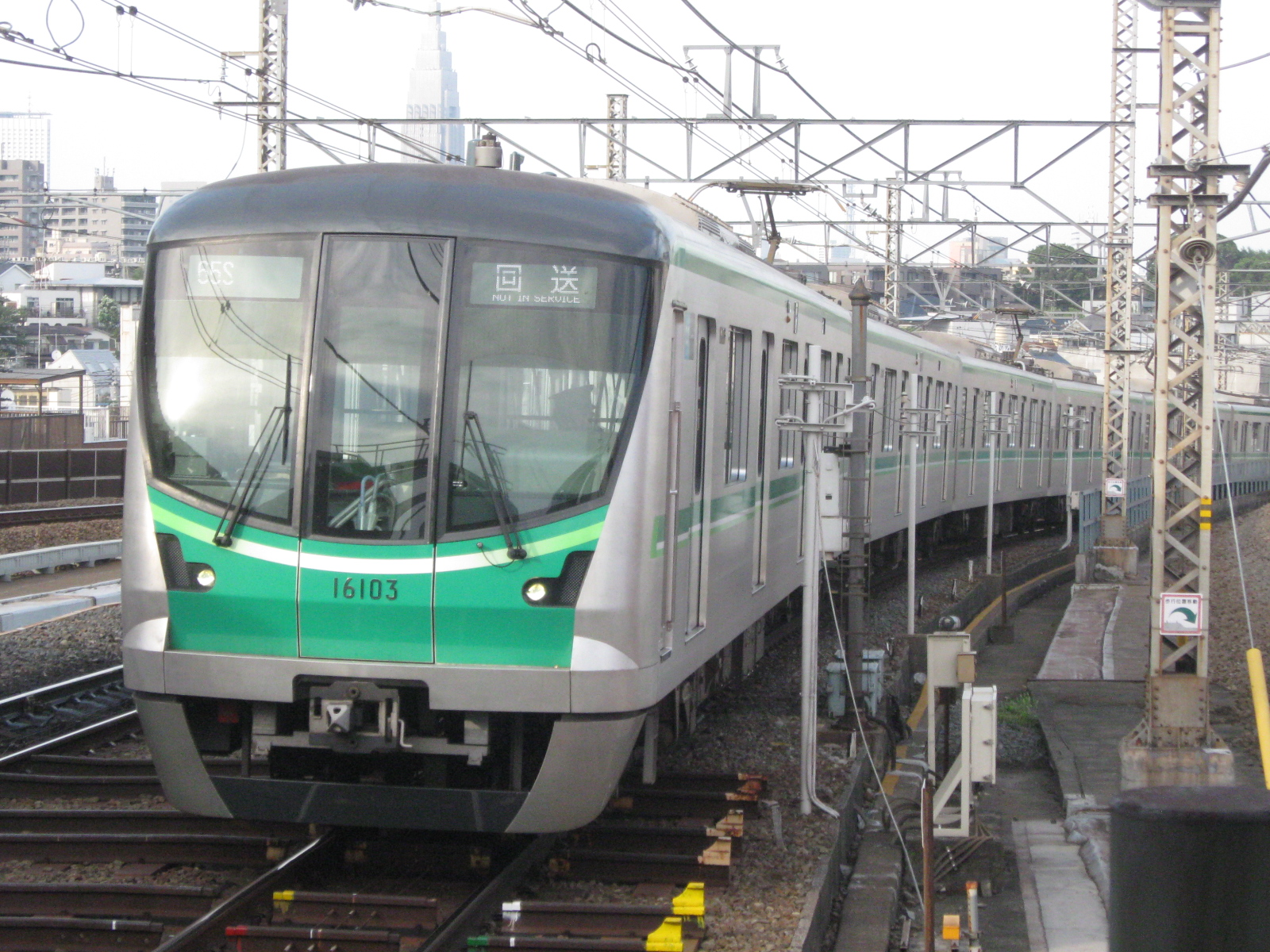
Set 16103 in July 2011, with centrally positioned cab-end door

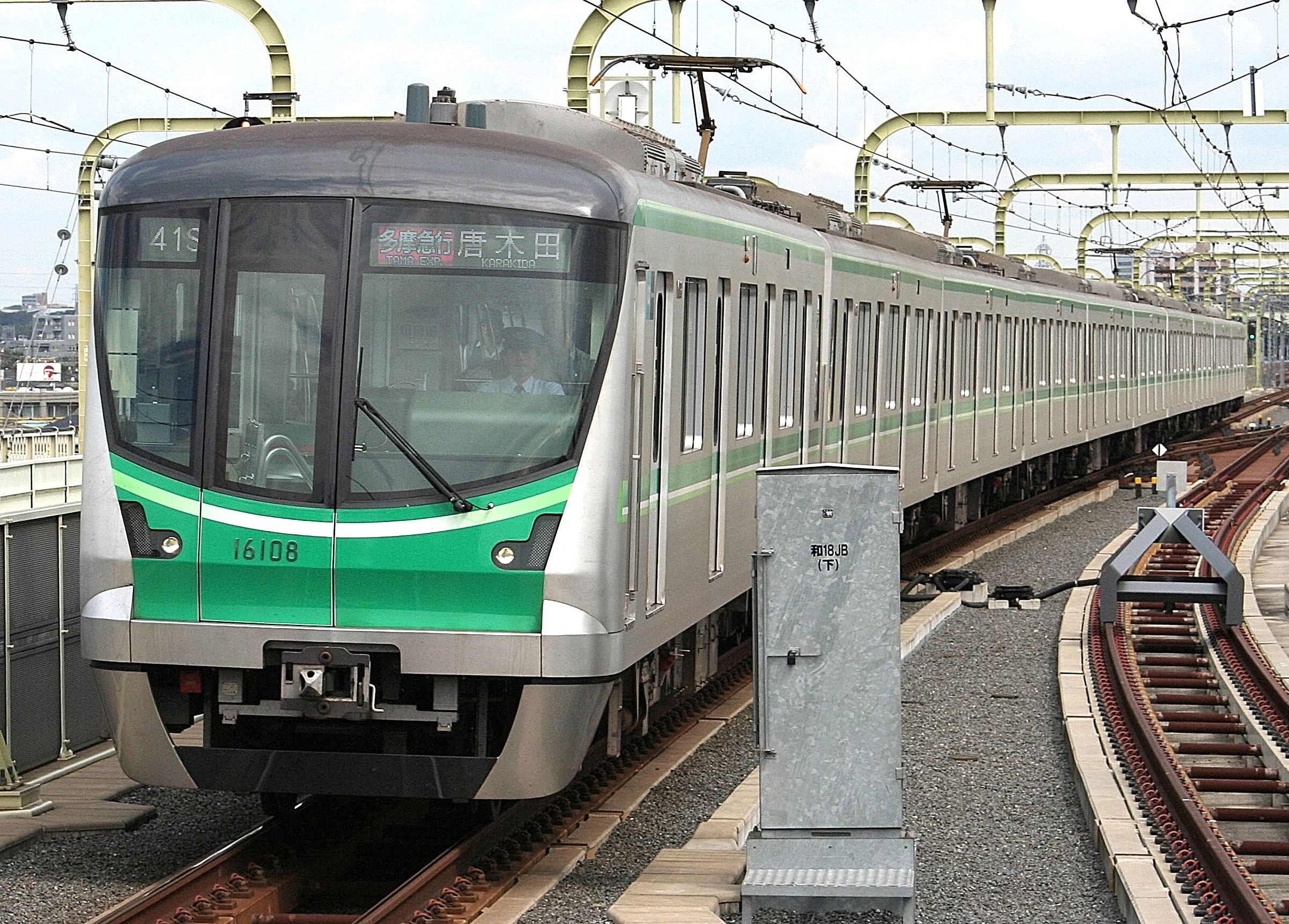
Set 16108 in September 2011, with offset cab-end door

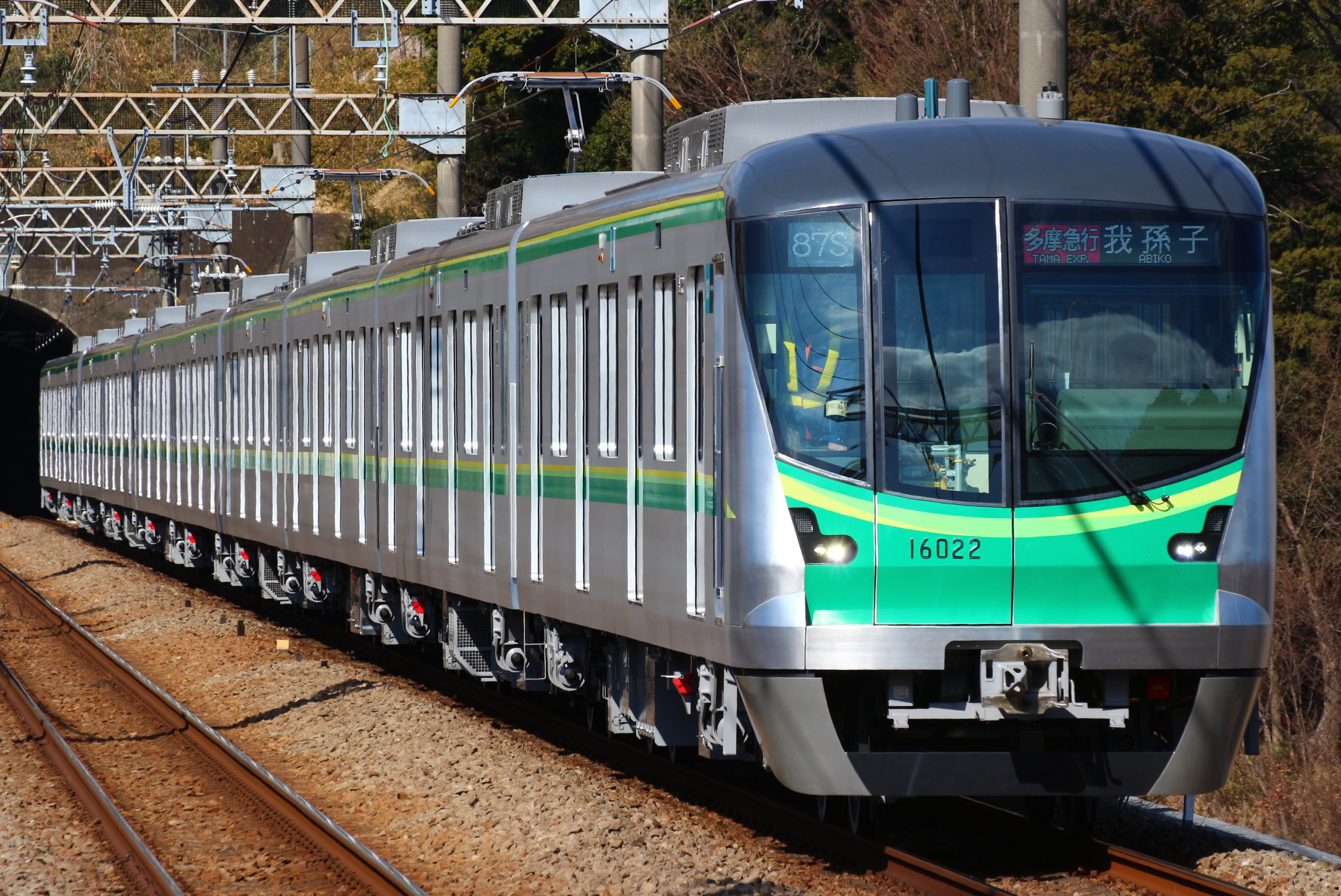
Set 16122 in February 2016, showing the livery applied to sets delivered from 2015 onward

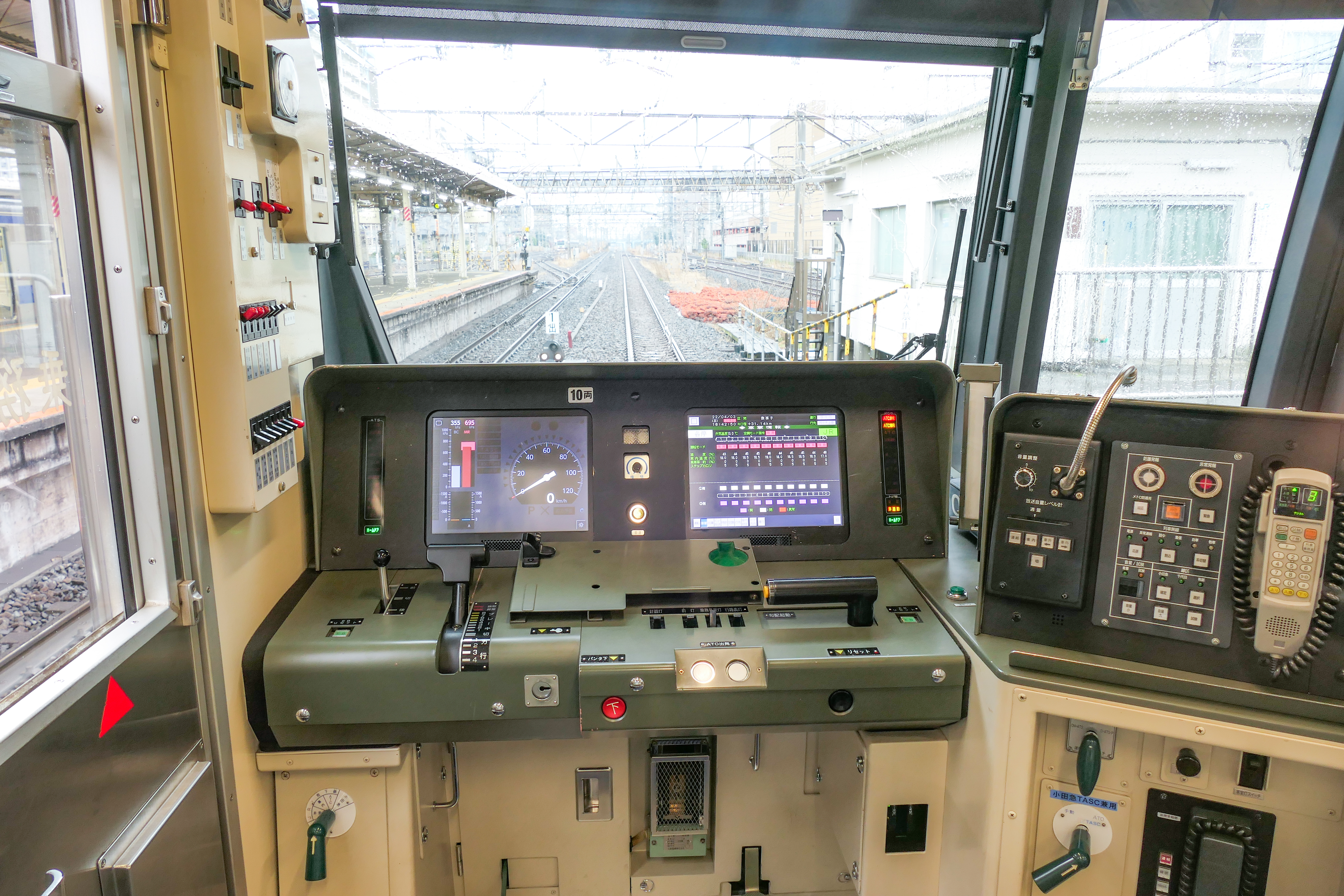
Driving cab interior view in April 2022

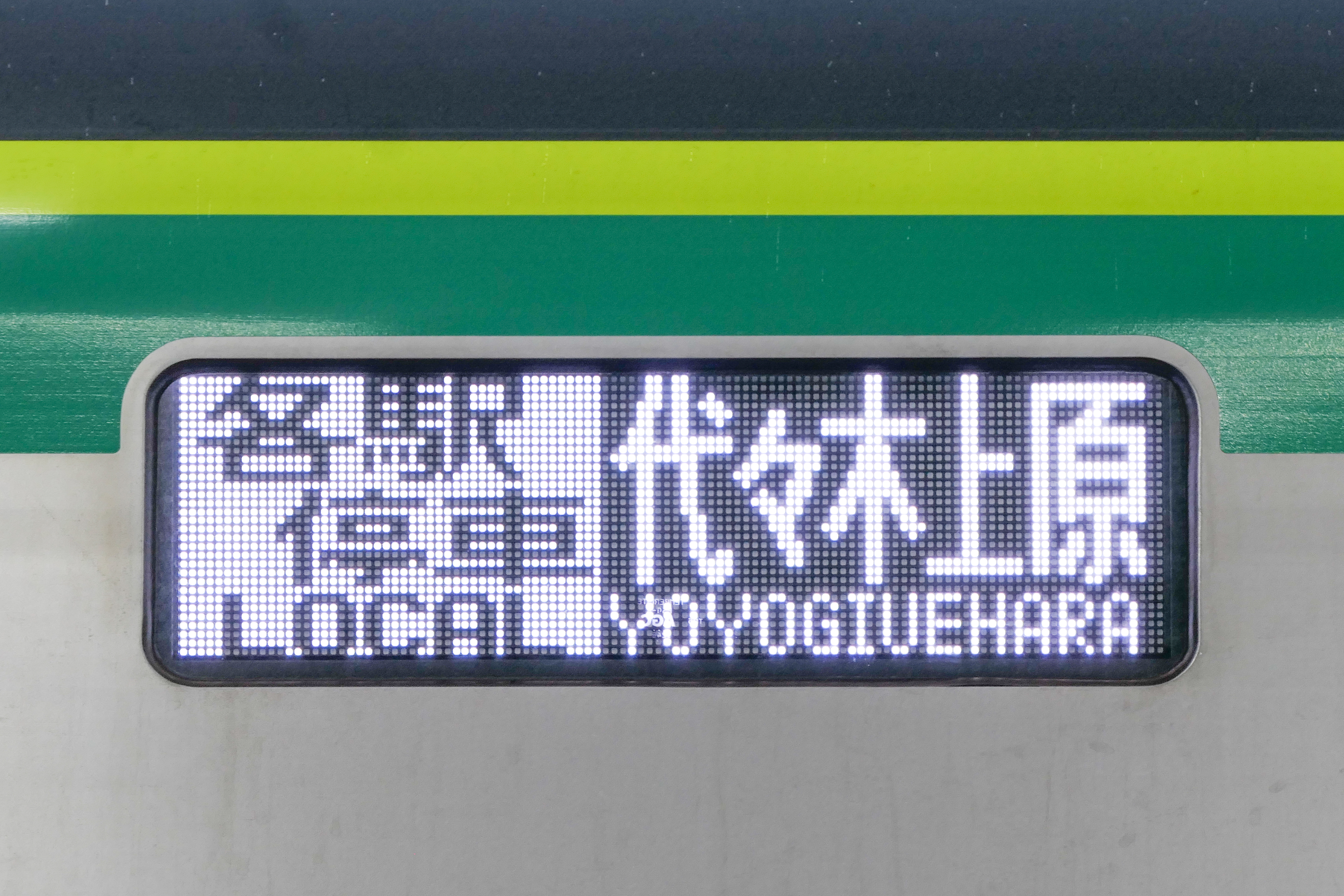
LED destination indicator panel

== Formation ==
As of October 2017, the fleet consists of 37 ten-car sets, formed as shown below, with car 1 at the Yoyogi-Uehara (south) end.

Car No.	1	2	3	4	5	6	7	8	9	10
Designation	CT1	M'	T	M	Tc1	Tc2	M	T'	M'	CT2
Numbering	16100	16200	16300	16400	16500	16600	16700	16800	16900	16000
Capacity	143	154								143
Weight (t)	27.9	33.5	26.5	33.6	28.7	28.0	33.6	26.7	33.5	27.8

Cars 2, 4, 7, and 9 each have one single-arm pantograph.

== Interior ==
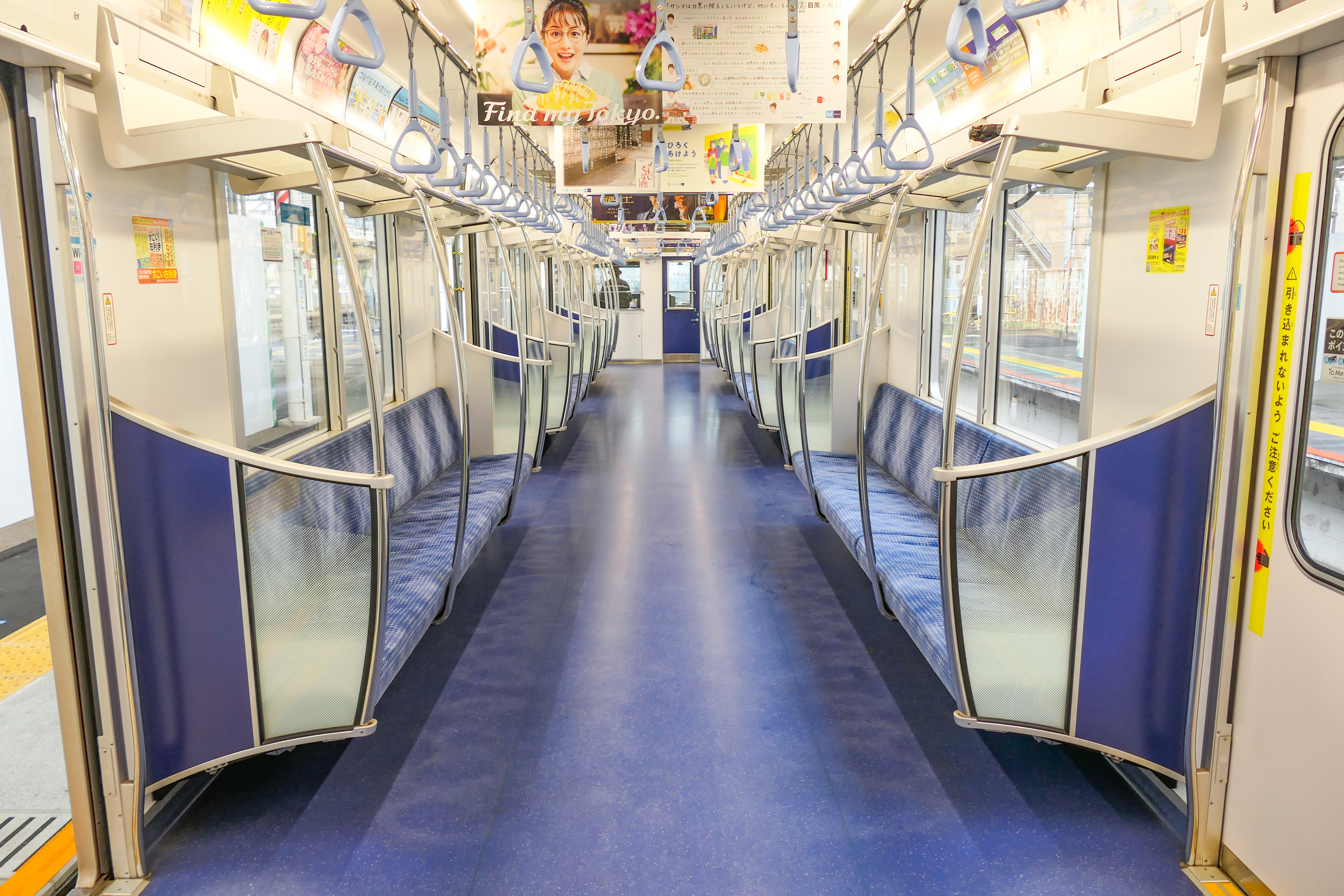
Interior view

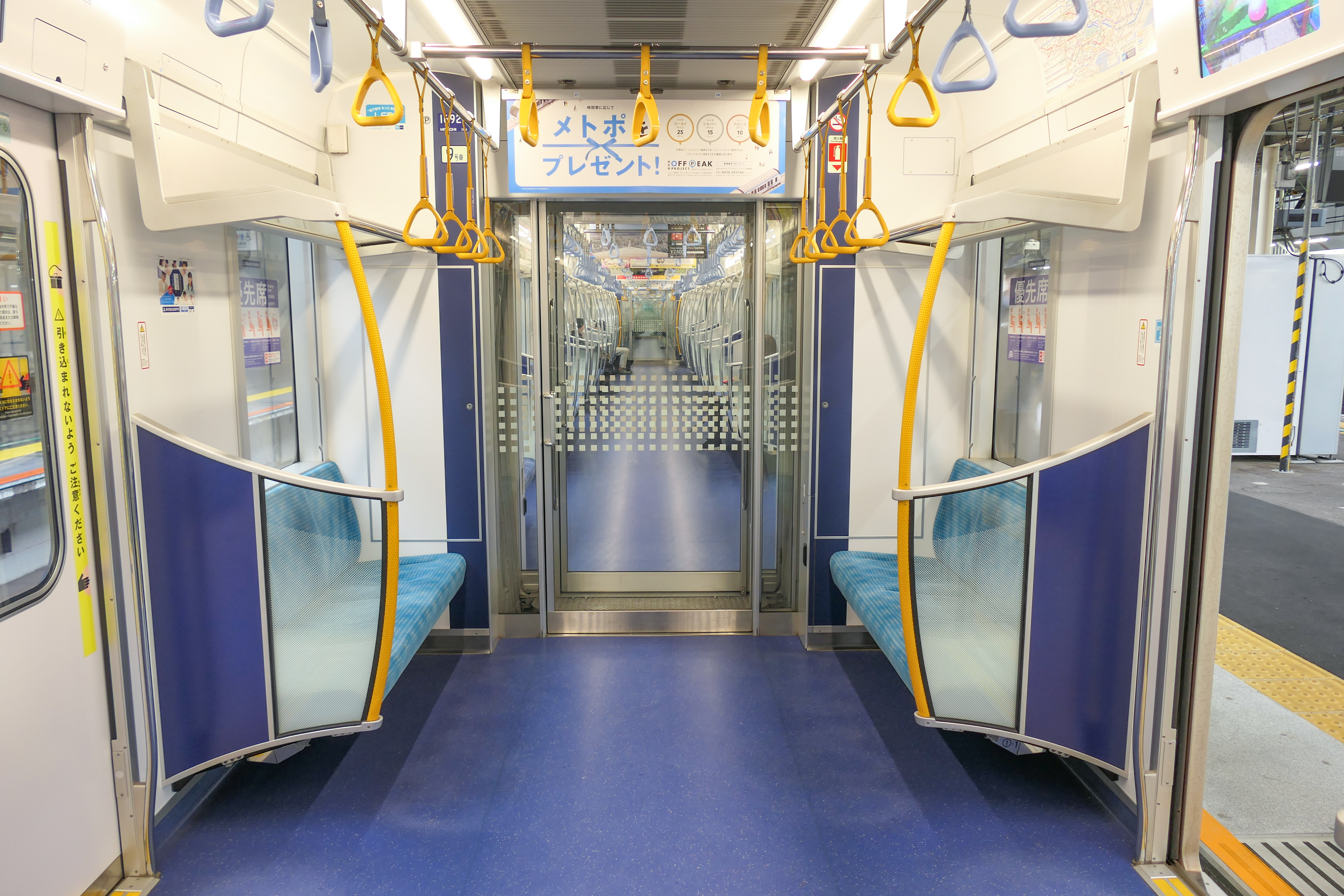
Priority seating

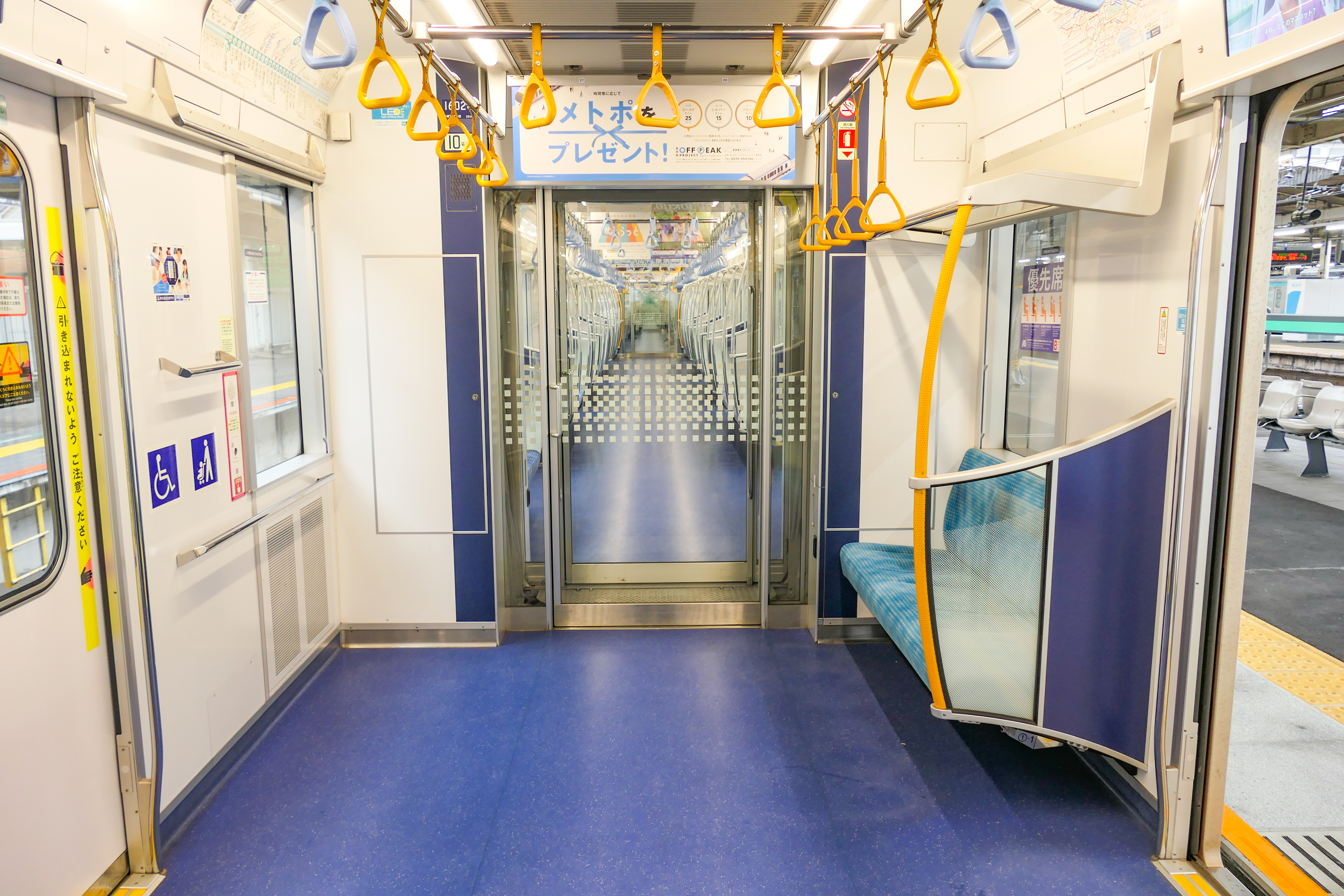
Priority seating with wheelchair space

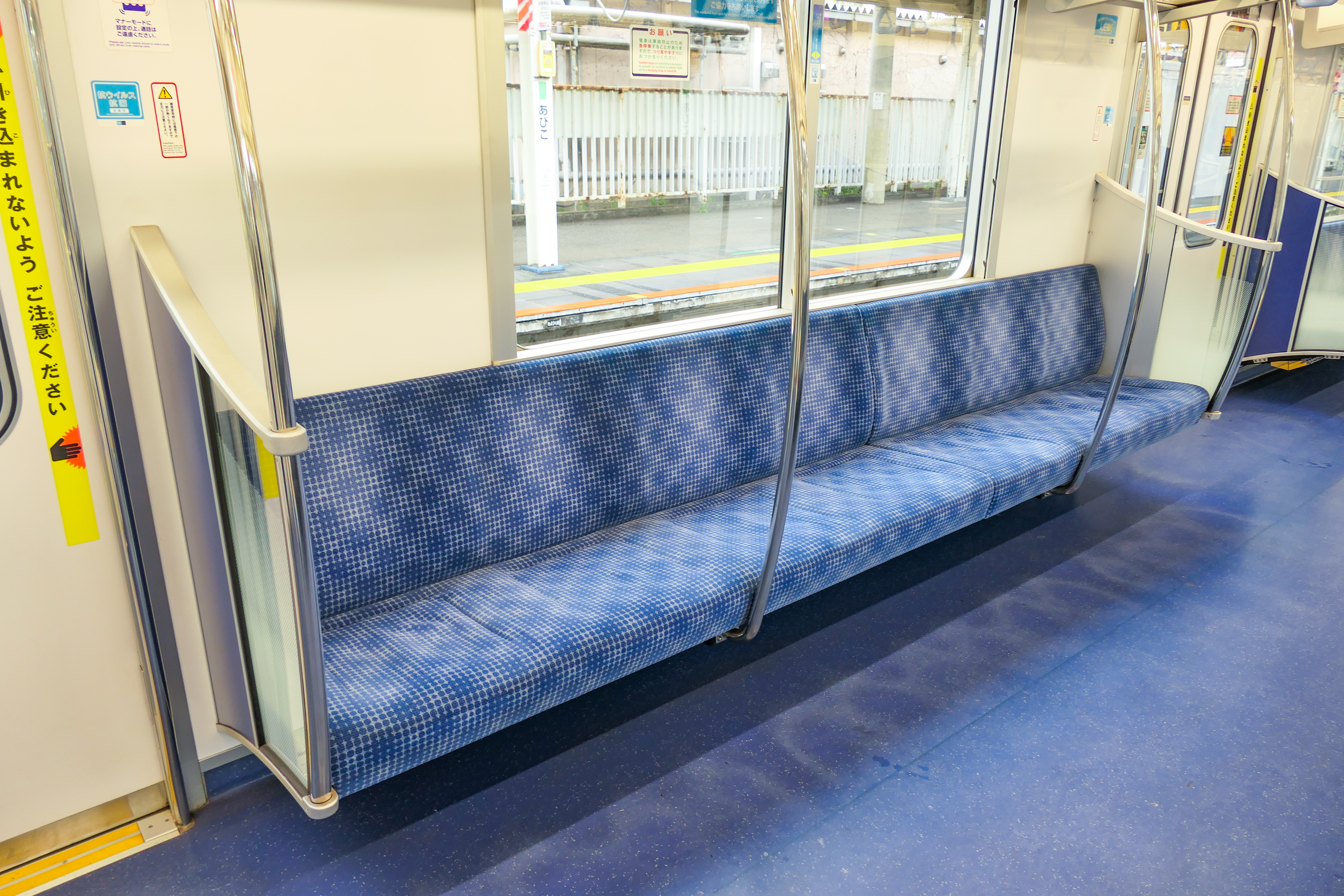
7-seat longitudinal bench seating

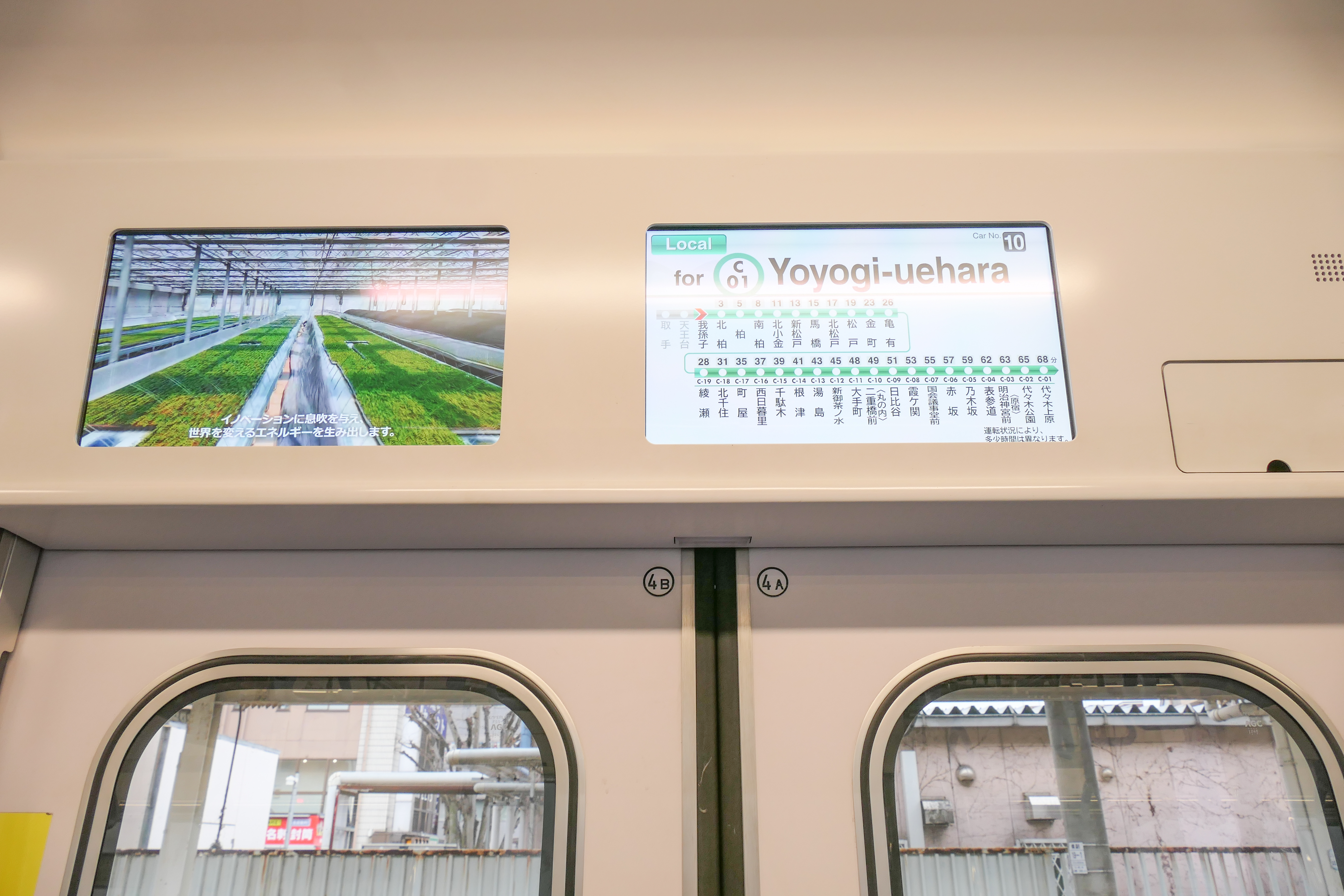
"TVIS" LCD passenger information display above door

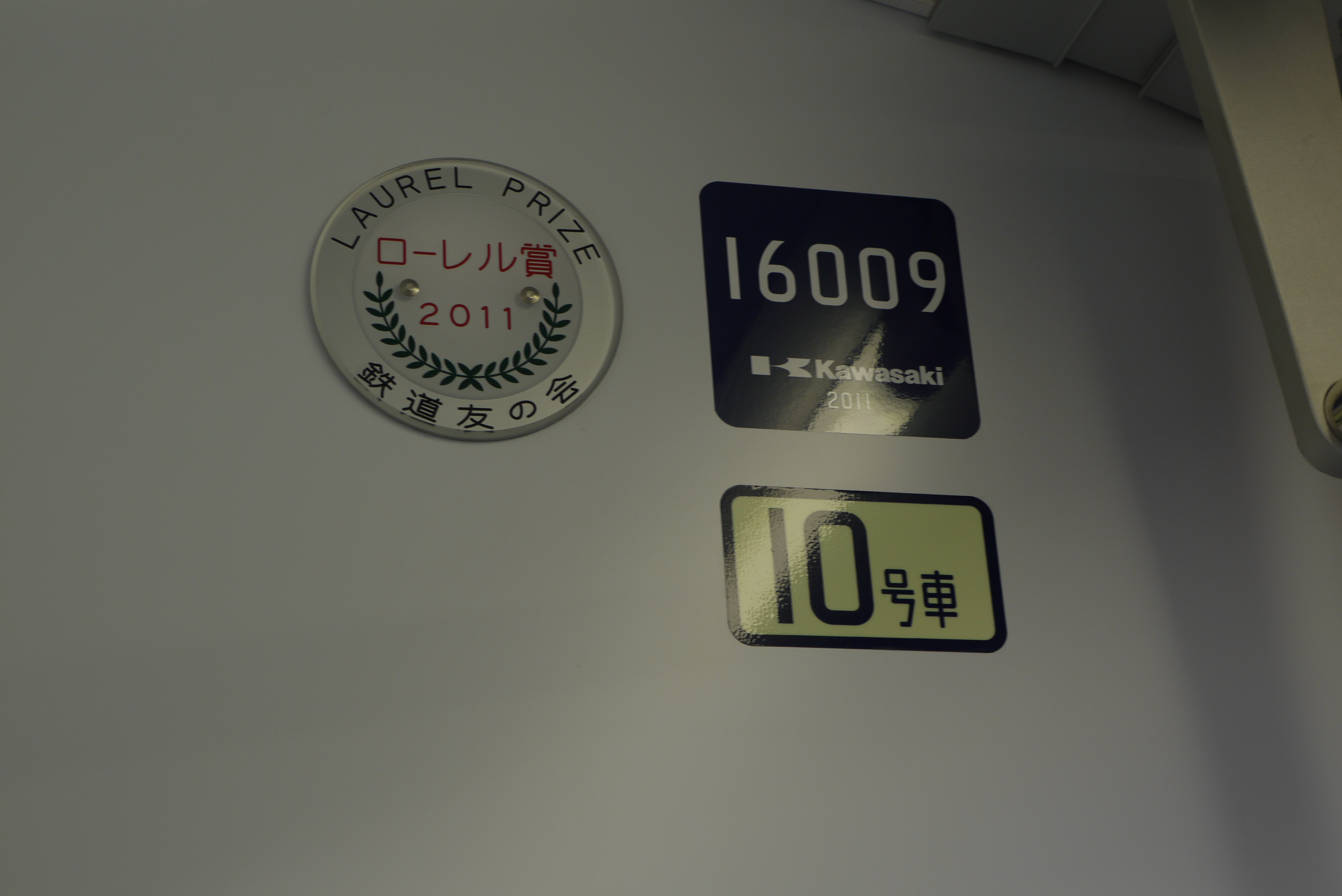
Train fleet number with builder's name and Laurel Prize plate

== History ==
The first 16000 series set was delivered in early August 2010. The type entered service on 4 November 2010.

In May 2011, the 16000 series was awarded the 2011 Laurel Prize, presented annually by the Japan Railfan Club.

In April 2012, car 8 (16807) of set 16107 was experimentally fitted with LED interior lighting replacing the normal fluorescent tubes used.

The final set on order, 16137, entered service in October 2017.

== Fleet details ==
Official delivery dates as follows.

Set No.	Manufacturer	Date delivered
16101	Kawasaki Heavy Industries	2010
16102	Kawasaki Heavy Industries	
16103	Kawasaki Heavy Industries	
16104	Kawasaki Heavy Industries	
16105	Kawasaki Heavy Industries	
16106	Kawasaki Heavy Industries	
16107	Kawasaki Heavy Industries	
16108	Kawasaki Heavy Industries	
16109	Kawasaki Heavy Industries	
16110	Kawasaki Heavy Industries	
16111	Kawasaki Heavy Industries	
16112	Kawasaki Heavy Industries	
16113	Hitachi	
16114	Hitachi	
16115	Hitachi	1 June 2012
16116	Hitachi	15 June 2012
16117	Hitachi	13 September 2015
16118	Hitachi	25 September 2015
16119	Hitachi	27 October 2015
16120	Hitachi	27 November 2015
16121	Hitachi	18 December 2015
16122	Hitachi	29 January 2016
16123	Hitachi	23 March 2016
16124	Hitachi	8 April 2016
16125	Hitachi	13 May 2016
16126	Hitachi	3 June 2016
16127	Hitachi	15 July 2016
16128	Hitachi	26 August 2016
16129	Kawasaki Heavy Industries	24 June 2016
16130	Kawasaki Heavy Industries	5 August 2016
16131	Kawasaki Heavy Industries	23 September 2016
16132	Kawasaki Heavy Industries	10 February 2017
16133	Kawasaki Heavy Industries	3 March 2017
16134	Kawasaki Heavy Industries	2017
16135	Kawasaki Heavy Industries	2017
16136	Kawasaki Heavy Industries	2017
16137	Kawasaki Heavy Industries	2017
