= Tokyo Metro 06 series =

Japanese train type

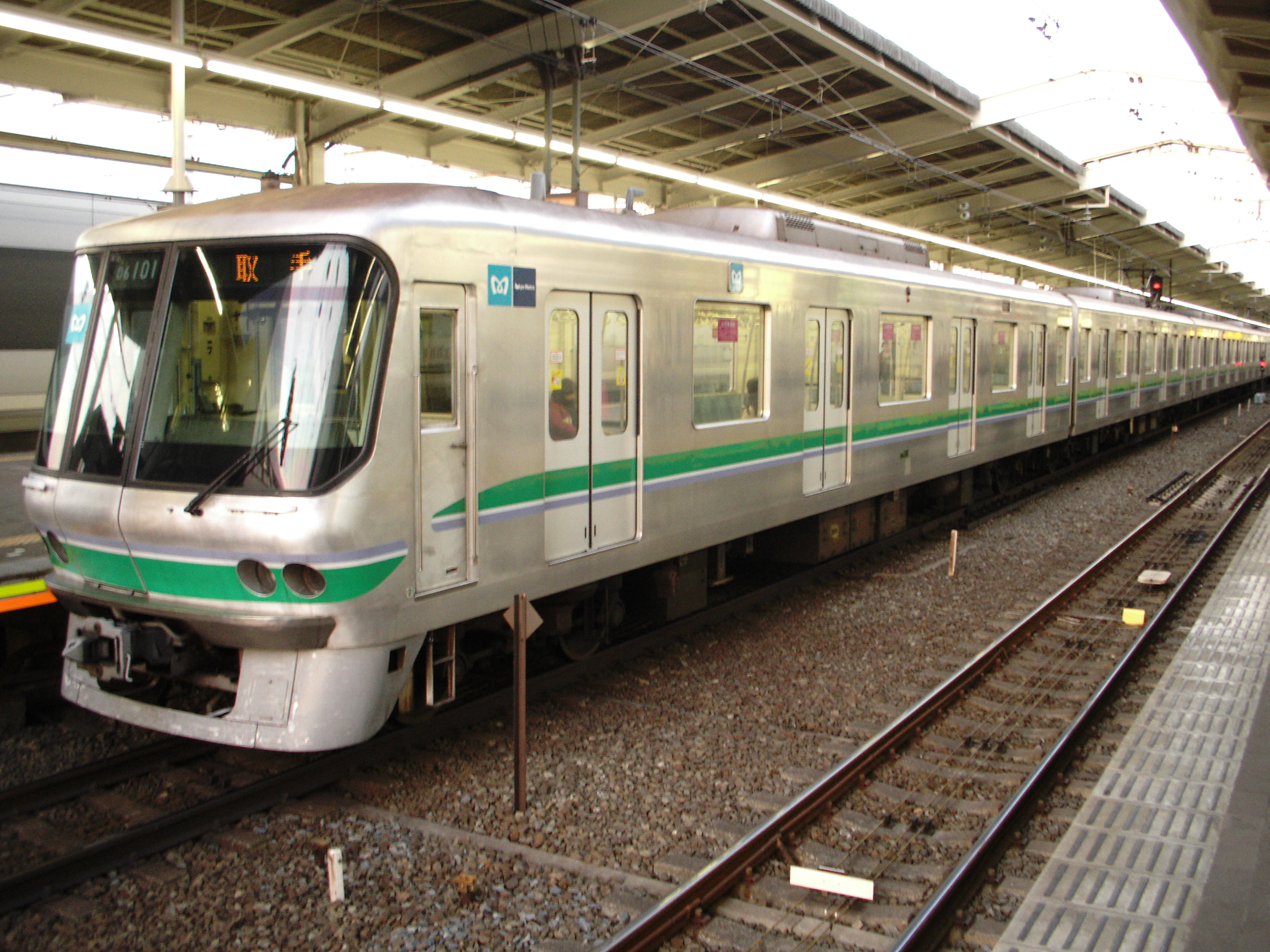
- 06 series train at Yoyogi-Uehara Station
- In service: 1993–2015
- Manufacturer: Kawasaki Heavy Industries
- Constructed: 1992
- Entered service: 18 March 1993
- Scrapped: September 2015
- Number built: 1 set (10 vehicles)
- Successor: Tokyo Metro 16000 series
- Formation: 10 cars per trainset
- Fleet numbers: 71
- Capacity: 138 (46 seating) (end cars), 152 (54 seating) (intermediate cars)
- Operators: Tokyo Metro, previously TRTA
- Depot: Ayase
- Lines served: Tokyo Metro Chiyoda Line, Joban Line, Odakyu Odawara Line, Odakyu Tama Line

Specifications
- Car body construction: Aluminium
- Car length: 20 m (65 ft 7 in)
- Width: 2,865 mm (9 ft 4.8 in)
- Height: 4.14 m (13 ft 7 in)
- Doors: 4 pairs per side
- Maximum speed: 100 km/h (62.1 mph)
- Weight: 271.1 t
- Traction system: 3-level IGBT–VVVF type SVF009-AO (Toshiba)
- Traction motors: 4 × 205 kW (275 hp) 3-phase AC induction motor (Toshiba)
- Power output: 3.28 MW (4,399 hp)
- Transmission: Westinghouse-Natal Drive; Gear ratio: 7.79:1
- Acceleration: 3.3 km/(h⋅s) (2.1 mph/s)
- Deceleration: 3.7 km/(h⋅s) (2.3 mph/s) (service); 4.7 km/(h⋅s) (2.9 mph/s) (emergency)
- Electric systems: 1,500 V DC overhead wire
- Current collection: Lozenge-type pantograph
- Bogies: SS135, SS035
- Braking system: Electronically controlled pneumatic brakes with regenerative braking
- Safety systems: CS-ATC, JR ATS, Odakyu ATS
- Coupling system: Shibata coupler
- Track gauge: 1,067 mm (3 ft 6 in)

The Tokyo Metro 06 series (東京メトロ06系, Tōkyō Metoro 06-kei) was a metro electric multiple unit (EMU) train formerly operated by the Tokyo subway operator Tokyo Metro on the Tokyo Metro Chiyoda Line in Tokyo, Japan, from 1993 until 2015.

== Operations ==
The 06 series set operated on Tokyo Metro Chiyoda Line services, with through running to and from Toride on the JR East Joban Line.

== Formation ==
The sole 06 series set, numbered set 71, was based at Ayase Depot and was formed as shown below with four motored ("M") cars and six non-powered trailer ("T") cars, and car 1 at the Yoyogi-Uehara (southern) end.

Car No.	1	2	3	4	5	6	7	8	9	10
Designation	CT1	M1	T	M2	Tc1	Tc2	M3	T'	M1	CT2
Numbering	06 101	06 201	06 301	06 401	06 501	06 601	06 701	06 801	06 901	06 001

Cars 2, 4, 7, and 9 each had one lozenge-type pantograph. Car 4 was designated as a mildly air-conditioned car.

== Interior ==
Passenger accommodation consisted of longitudinal seating throughout. Cars 2 and 9 had wheelchair spaces.

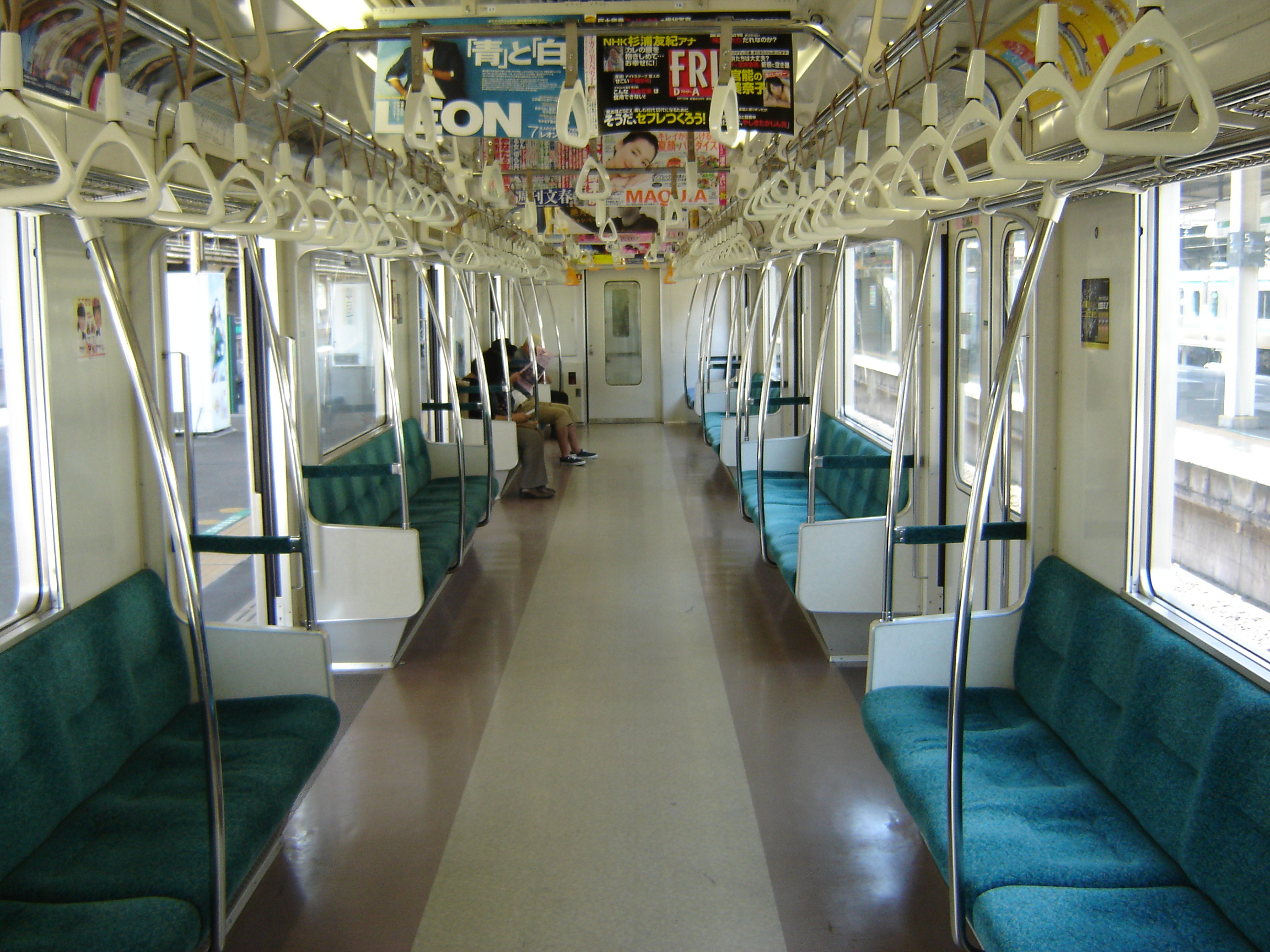
Interior view in 2013 following the addition of stanchion poles along the seats

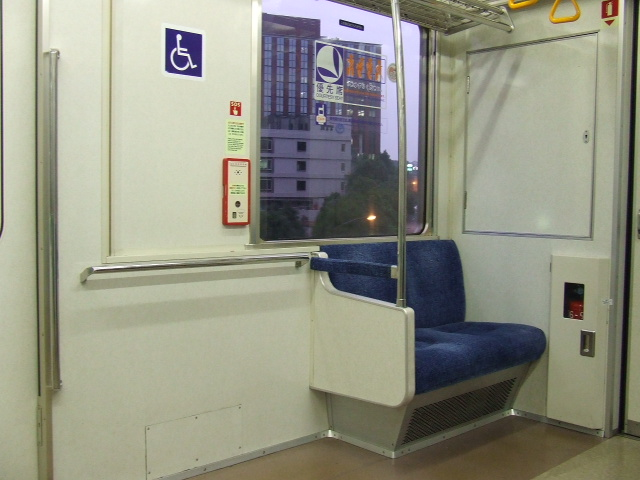
Priority seating and wheelchair space

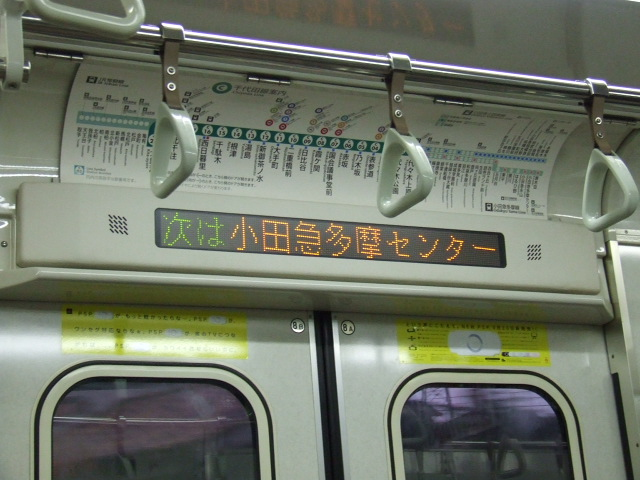
Passenger information display above door

== History ==
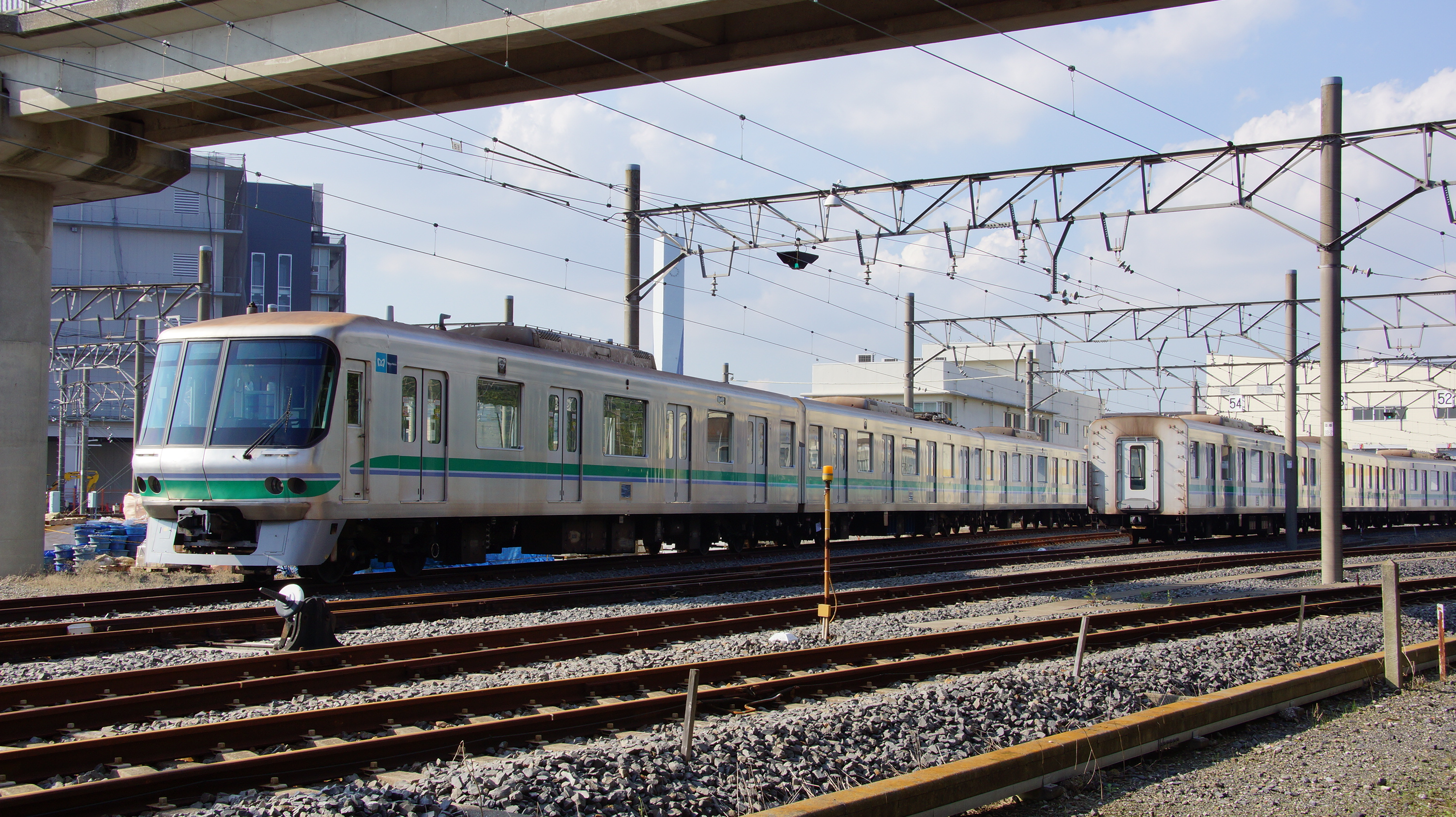
The 06 series set at Shinkiba Depot in September 2015 awaiting scrapping

Built by Kawasaki Heavy Industries, the single ten-car set was delivered in December 1992, and entered service in March 1993. From January 2015, the set was removed from regular service. It was moved to Shinkiba Depot in August 2015, where cutting up commenced in September of the same year.

== Gallery ==
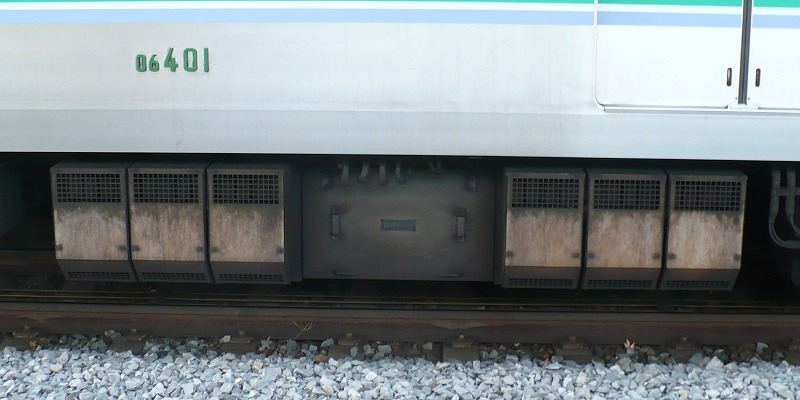
VVVF inverter of the 06 series

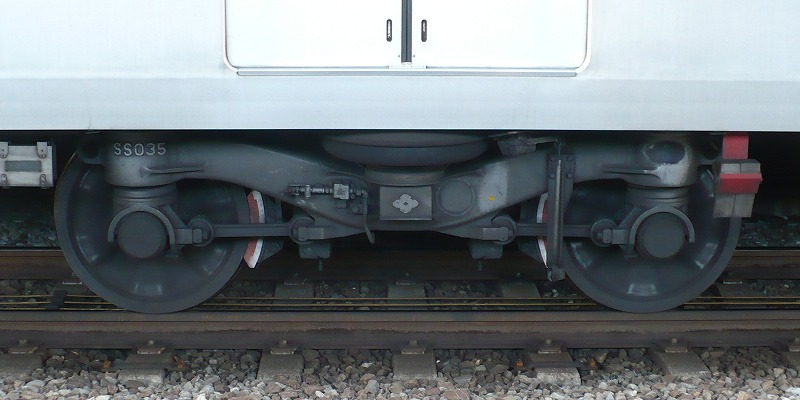
SS035 bogie as used on the 06 series

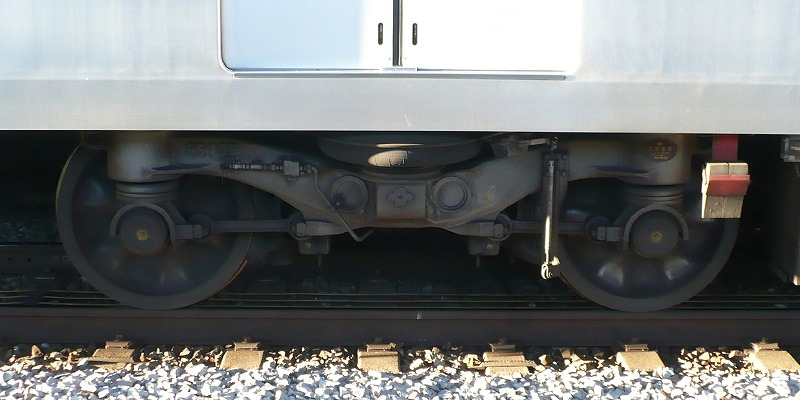
SS135 bogie as used on the 06 series

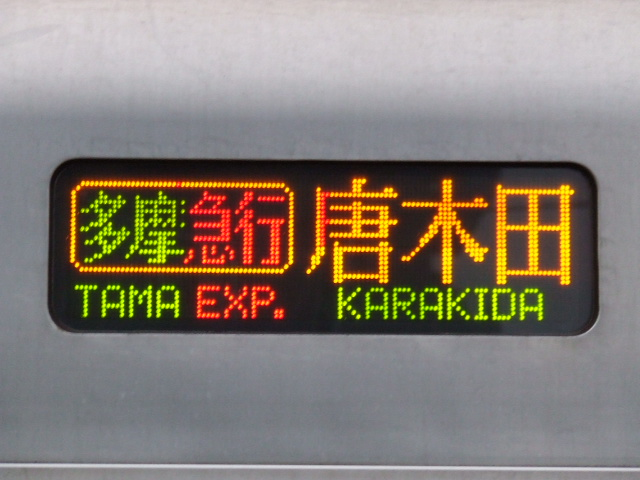
External LED indicator on the 06 series

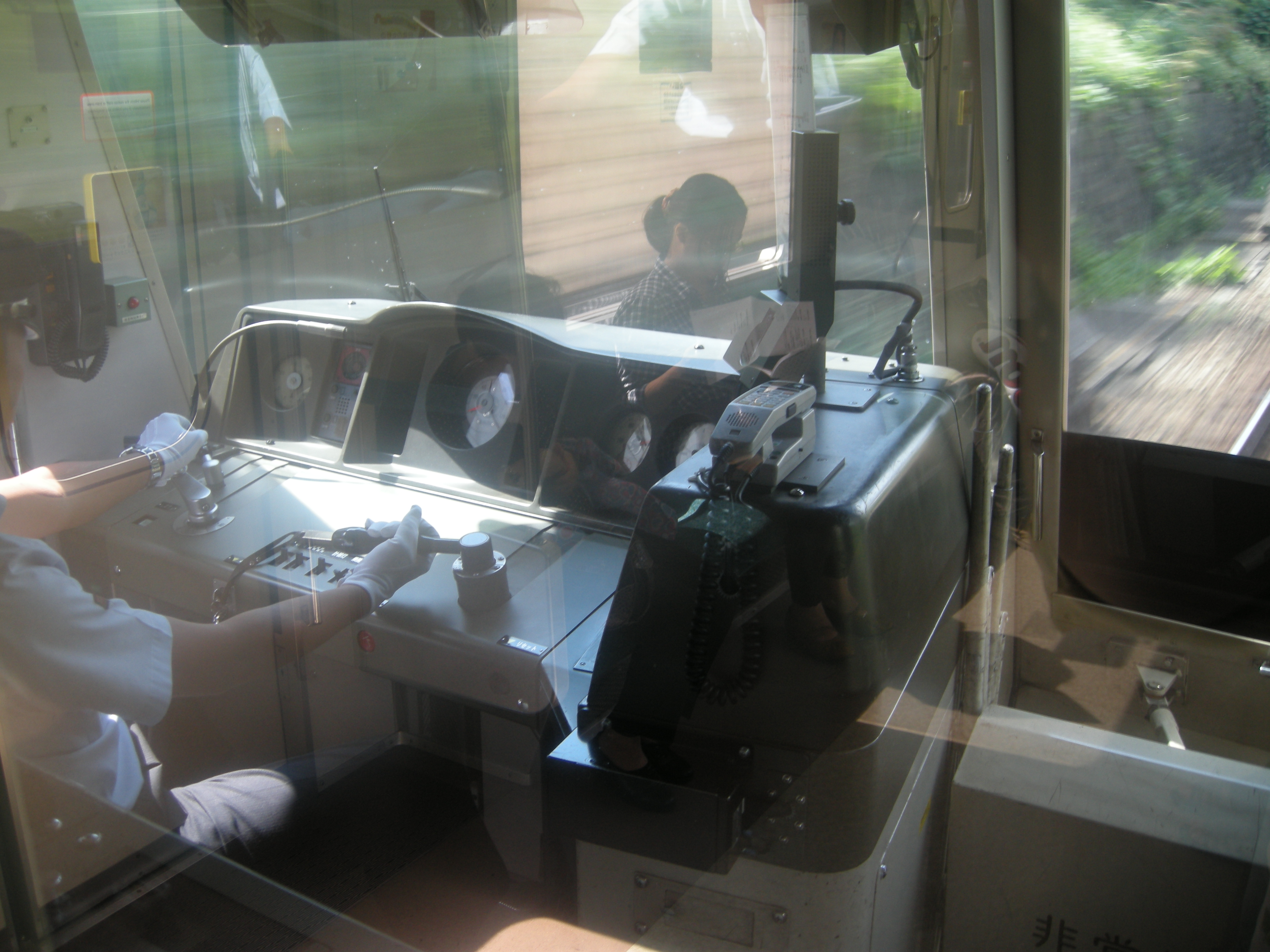
Cab of the 06 series
