= Kōshū-Kaidō Station =

Monorail station in Hino, Tokyo, Japan

Coordinates: 35°40′42″N 139°24′33″E

Kōshū-Kaidō Station 甲州街道駅
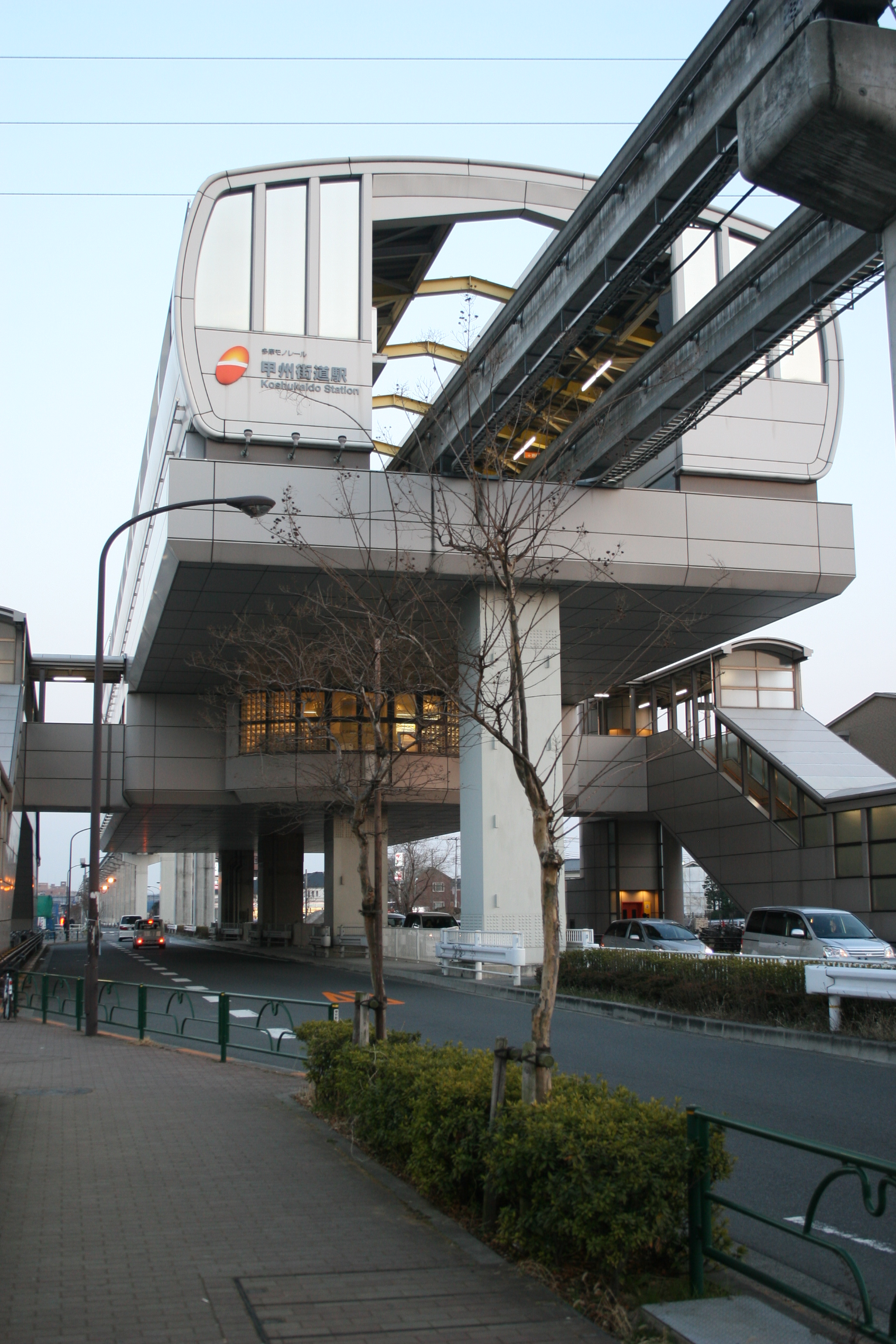
- Kōshū-Kaidō Station

General information
- Location: 1030 Hino, Hino-shi, Tokyo （東京都日野市大字日野1030番地） Japan
- Operator: Tokyo Tama Intercity Monorail
- Line: ■ Tama Toshi Monorail Line
- Platforms: 2 side platforms
- Connections: Bus stop

Other information
- Station code: TT09

History
- Opened: 10 January 2000

Passengers
- FY2013: 3,854 daily

Services
Preceding station	Tokyo Tama Intercity Monorail	Following station
Manganji (TT-08) towards Tama-Center	Tama Toshi Monorail Line	Shibasaki-Taiikukan (TT-10) towards Kamikitadai
Location

Kōshū-Kaidō Station (甲州街道駅, Kōshū-kaidō-eki) is a station on the Tama Toshi Monorail Line in Hino, Tokyo, Japan.

== Lines ==
Kōshū-Kaidō Station is a station on the Tama Toshi Monorail Line and is located 8.0 kilometers from the terminus of the line at Kamikitadai Station.

== Station layout ==
Kōshū-Kaidō Station is a raised station with two tracks and two opposed side platforms, with the station building located underneath. It is a standardized station building for this monorail line.

=== Platforms ===
1	■ Tama Toshi Monorail Line	Tachikawa-Kita, Tamagawa-Jōsui, Kamikitadai
2	■ Tama Toshi Monorail Line	Takahatafudō, Tama-Center

== History ==
The station opened on 10 January 2000.

Station numbering was introduced in February 2018 with Kōshū-Kaidō being assigned TT09.

== Surrounding area ==
The station is in the middle of a residential area, running above Tokyo Metropolitan Route 503.
